= List of songs recorded by Faith No More =

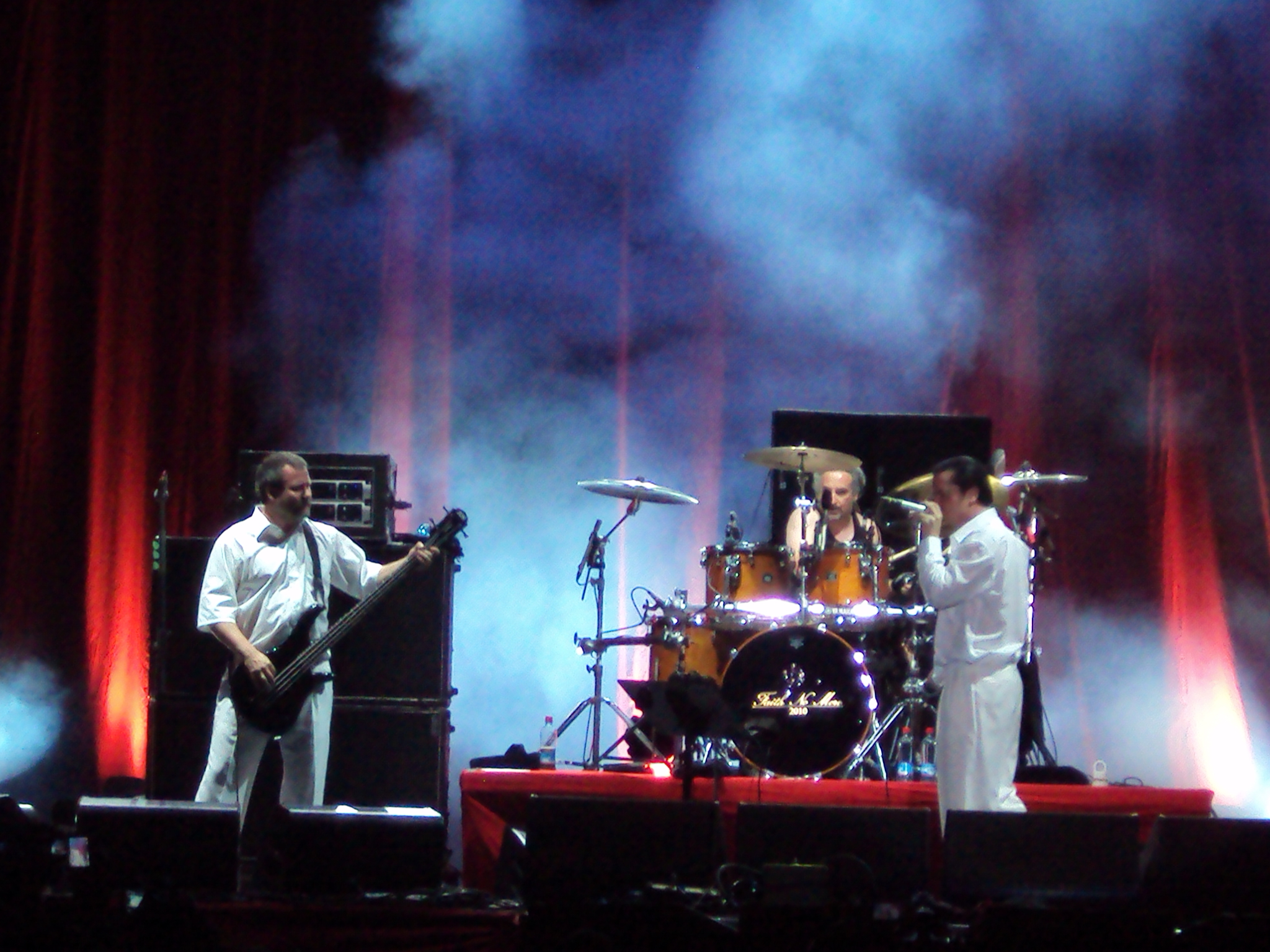
Billy Gould, Mike Bordin and Mike Patton performing in Chile in 2010

Faith No More, a San Francisco-based band, have recorded approximately 100 songs over the course of their career; this includes material from six studio albums, one live album, and numerous B-side tracks and out-takes. Faith No More were founded in 1981 as Sharp Young Men, and changed their name to Faith. No Man before releasing the 1982 double A-side single "Quiet in Heaven" / "Song of Liberty". Upon assuming the name Faith No More, the band's first two full-length albums, We Care a Lot and Introduce Yourself, were driven mostly by new vocalist Chuck Mosley and the "metallic guitar" of Jim Martin, blending elements of rap and heavy metal music. Mosley was later replaced by Mr. Bungle vocalist Mike Patton, who added lyrics to the already-written music for 1989's The Real Thing. Their next studio album, Angel Dust, moved away from the band's rap-influenced sound to experiment with different musical genres; a trend which became much more pronounced on the 1995 album King for a Day... Fool for a Lifetime.

Between the recording of the latter two albums, Martin left the band. Reports are mixed as to whether he quit or was fired; however he had stopped contributing to the band's output during the recording of Angel Dust, leaving bass player Billy Gould to record guitar parts for "Another Body Murdered", the band's contribution to the Judgment Night soundtrack. Martin's guitarist role was filled during the recording for King for a Day... Fool for a Lifetime by Patton's Mr. Bungle bandmate Trey Spruance, and on the accompanying tour by roadie Dean Menta. While recording their final album, Album of the Year, the band was joined by guitarist Jon Hudson. Hudson was also present for the band's collaboration with Sparks, which produced two songs, including the single "This Town Ain't Big Enough for Both of Us". In 1998, they released the compilation Who Cares a Lot? The Greatest Hits, which contains a number of previously unreleased songs.

Among Faith No More's best known songs are "We Care a Lot", an "antiprotest" song which exists in a different version on each of the Mosley-fronted albums; "Epic", a breakthrough hit which spent three weeks at number one in Australia and made the top ten in the United States; and "Midlife Crisis", which has featured in the 2004 video game Grand Theft Auto: San Andreas. "Midlife Crisis" is also cited as their top fan-rated song in a poll that compiled ratings from 17,345 fans. ("The Real Thing", "King for a Day", "Caffeine", "The Gentle Art of Making Enemies", "Ashes to Ashes", "Just a Man", "Stripsearch", "Everything's Ruined", and "Last Cup of Sorrow" round out the top 10).

The band officially split up in April 1998, reforming again in 2009 for a series of tours. The band's first album since reuniting, Sol Invictus, was released in 2015, preceded by the single "Motherfucker".

== List of songs ==
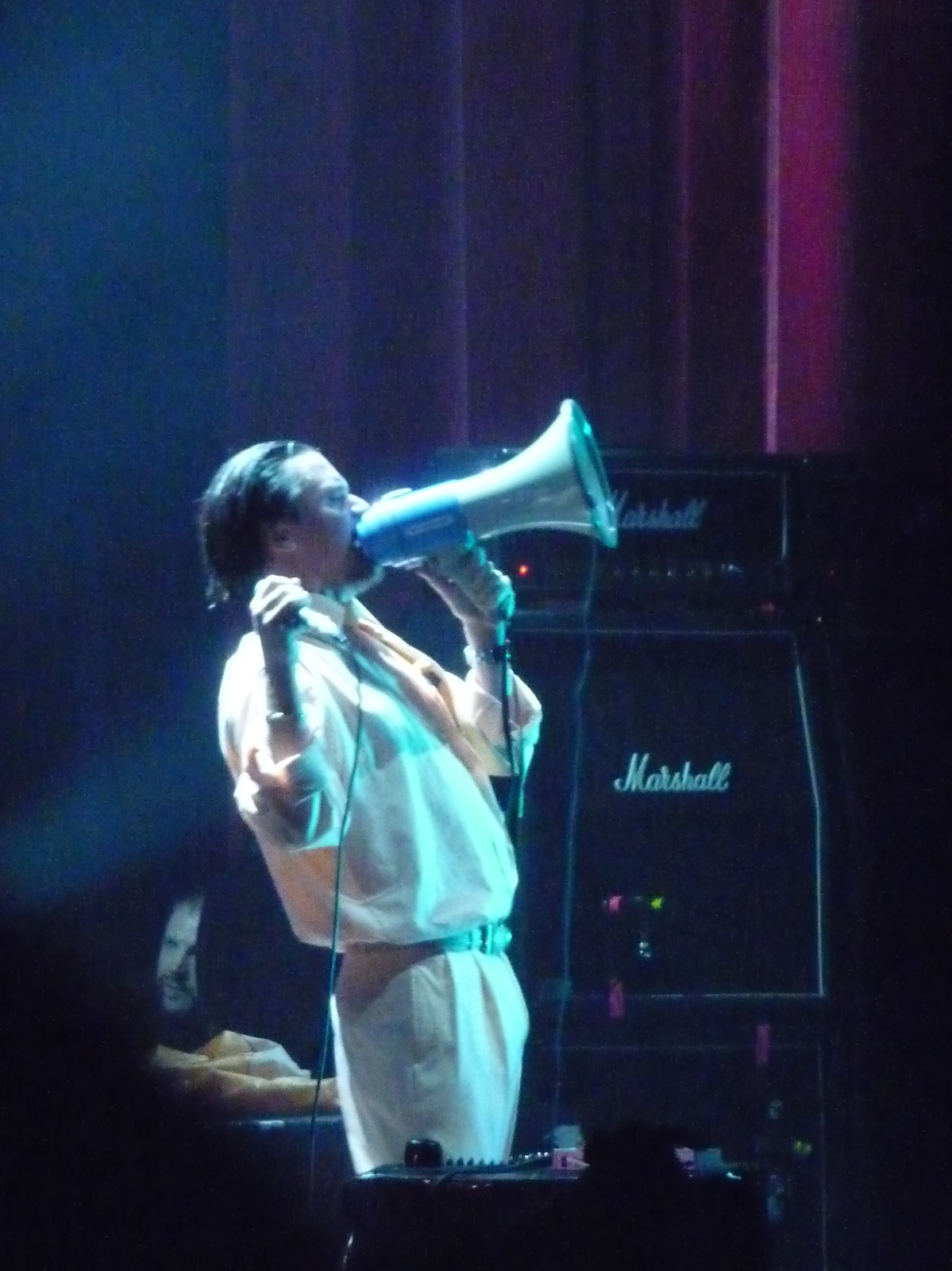
Mike Patton (pictured in 2009) wrote the lyrics for The Real Thing shortly after joining the band.

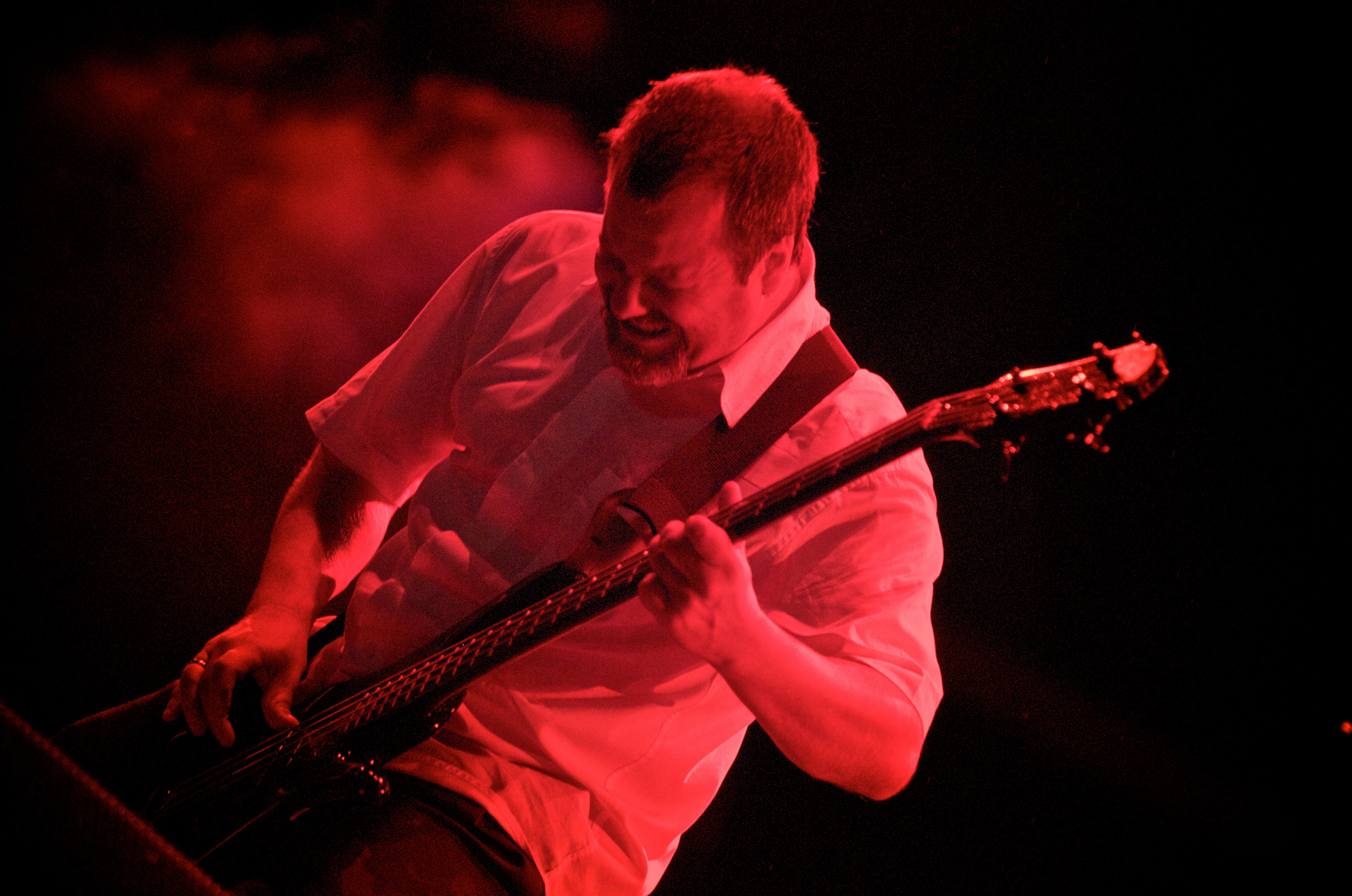
Billy Gould (pictured in 2009) has writing credits on every studio album released by Faith No More.

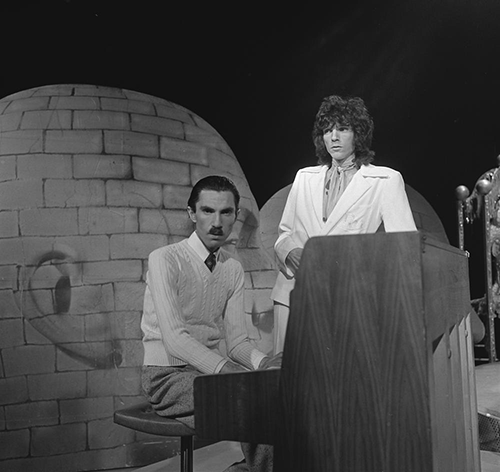
Faith No More collaborated on two songs for Plagiarism, a 1997 album by Sparks (pictured in 1974).

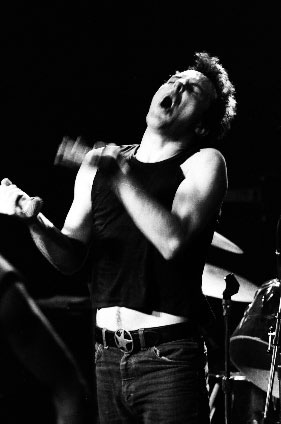
The Virus 100 Various Artists compilation contains a cover of Dead Kennedys' "Let's Lynch the Landlord" (singer Jello Biafra pictured).

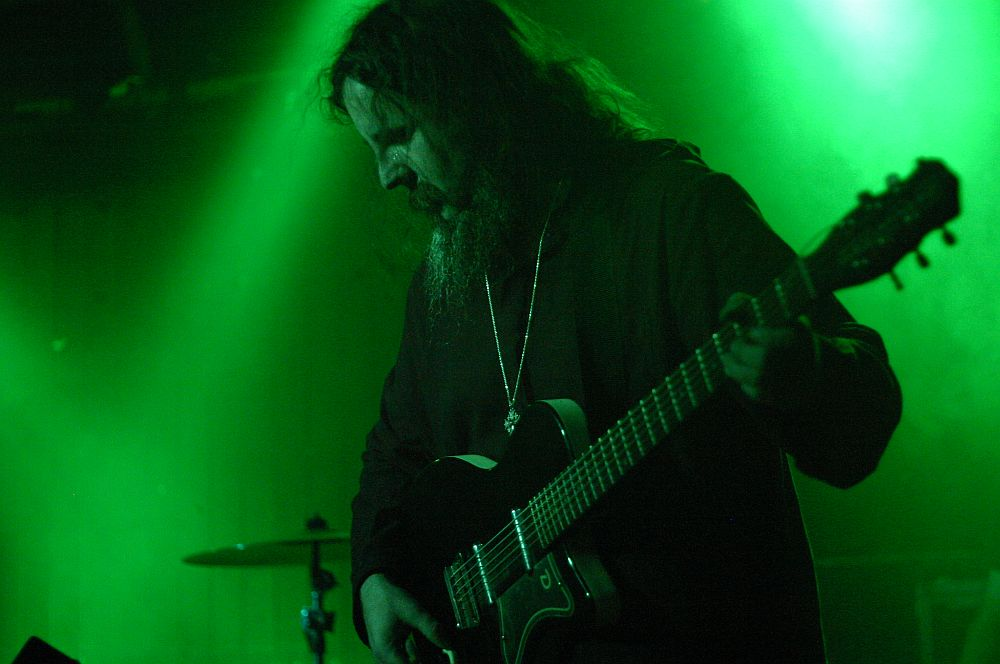
Mr. Bungle guitarist Trey Spruance has several songwriting credits on King for a Day... Fool for a Lifetime.

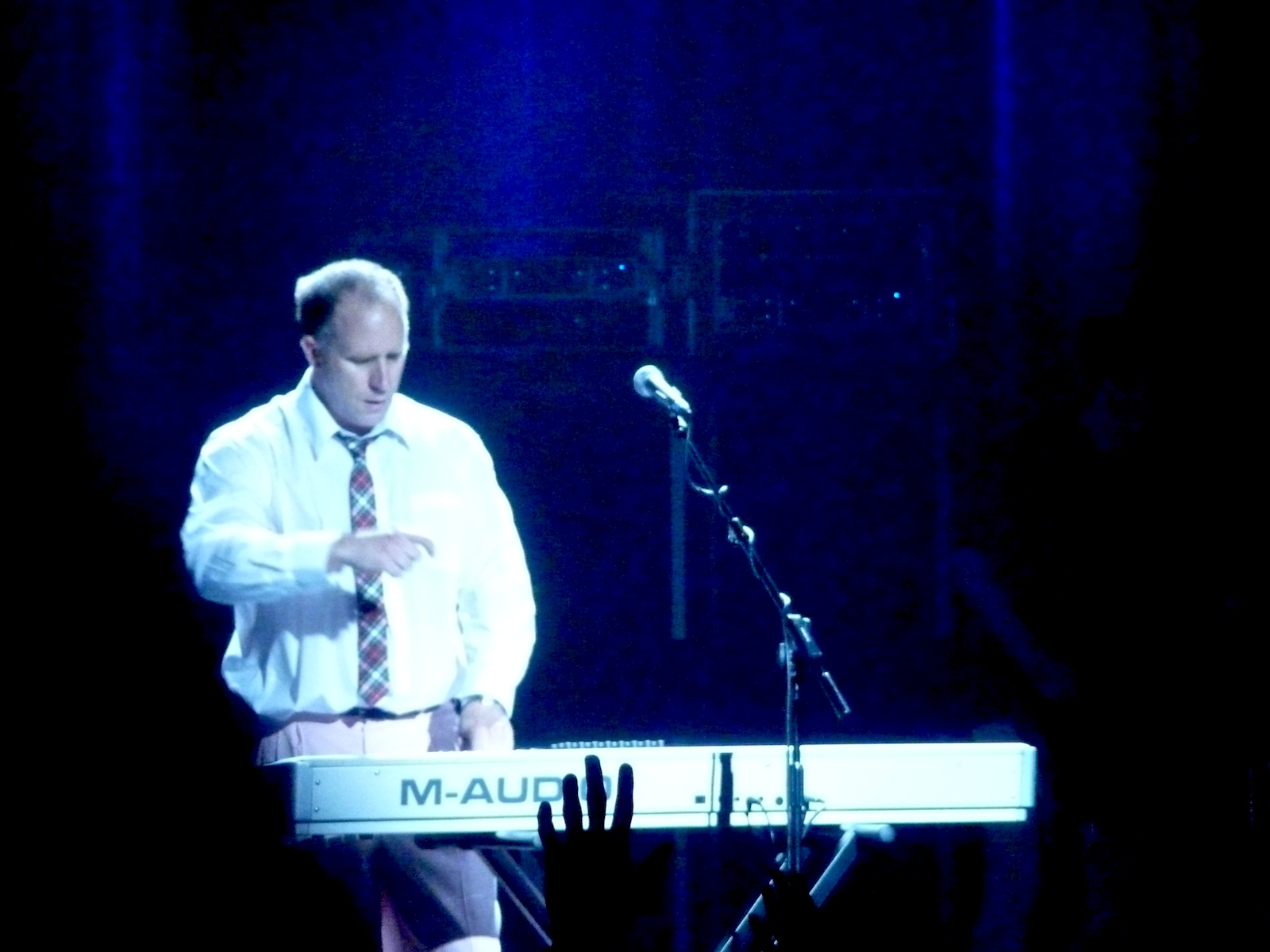
Keyboard player Roddy Bottum (pictured in 2009) had his only solo songwriting credit for Angel Dust's "Be Aggressive".

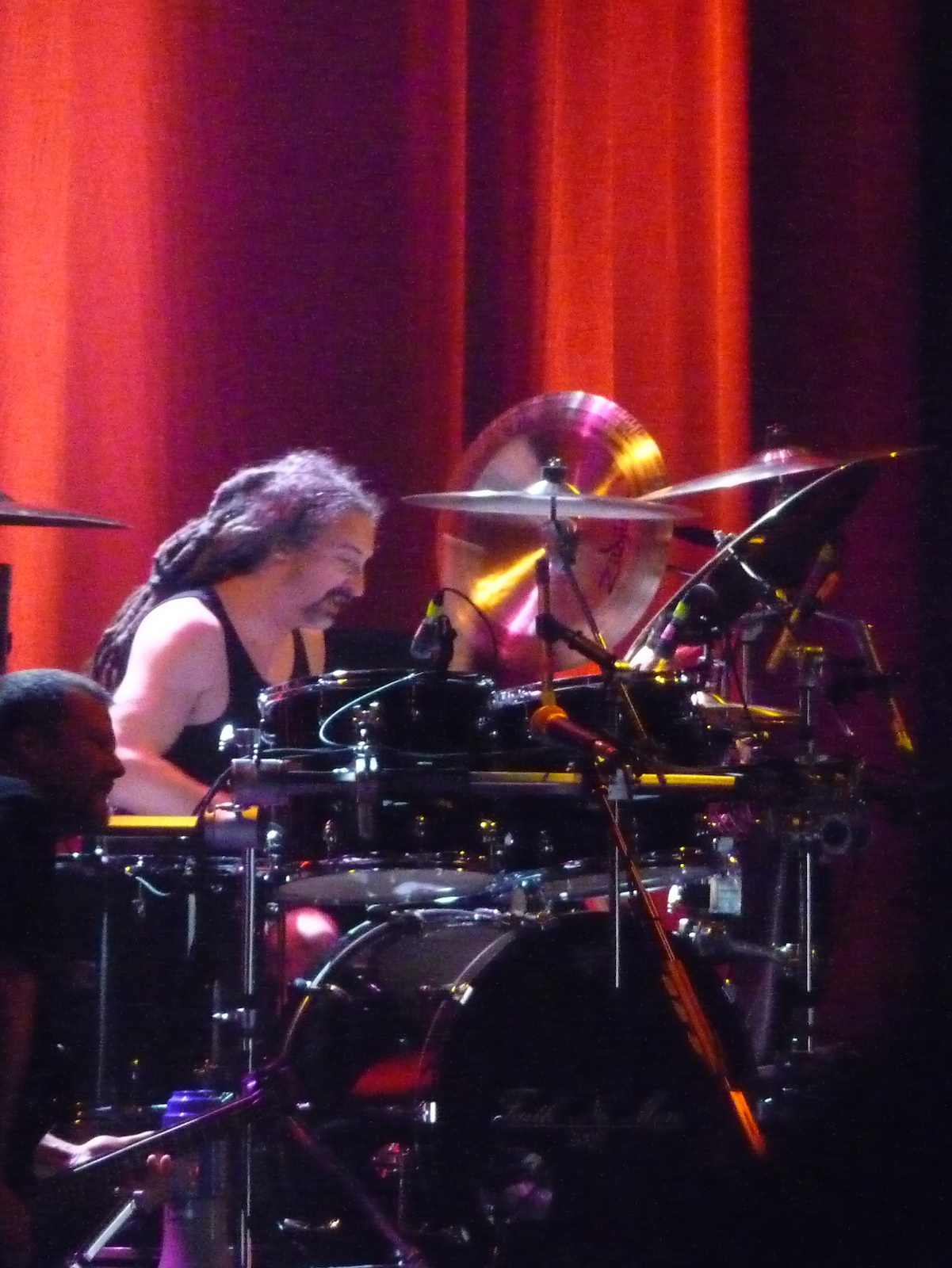
Drummer Mike Bordin (pictured in 2009) has writing credits on every studio album released by Faith No More.

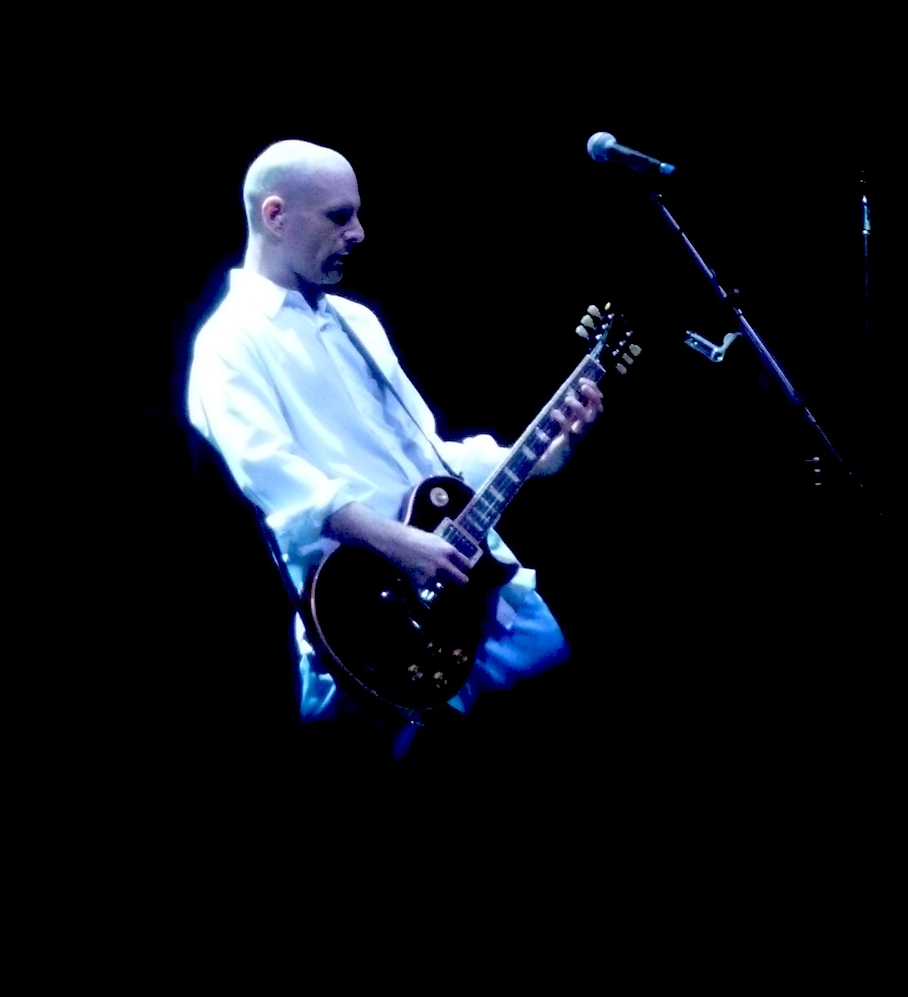
Guitarist Jon Hudson joined the band for 1997's Album of the Year.

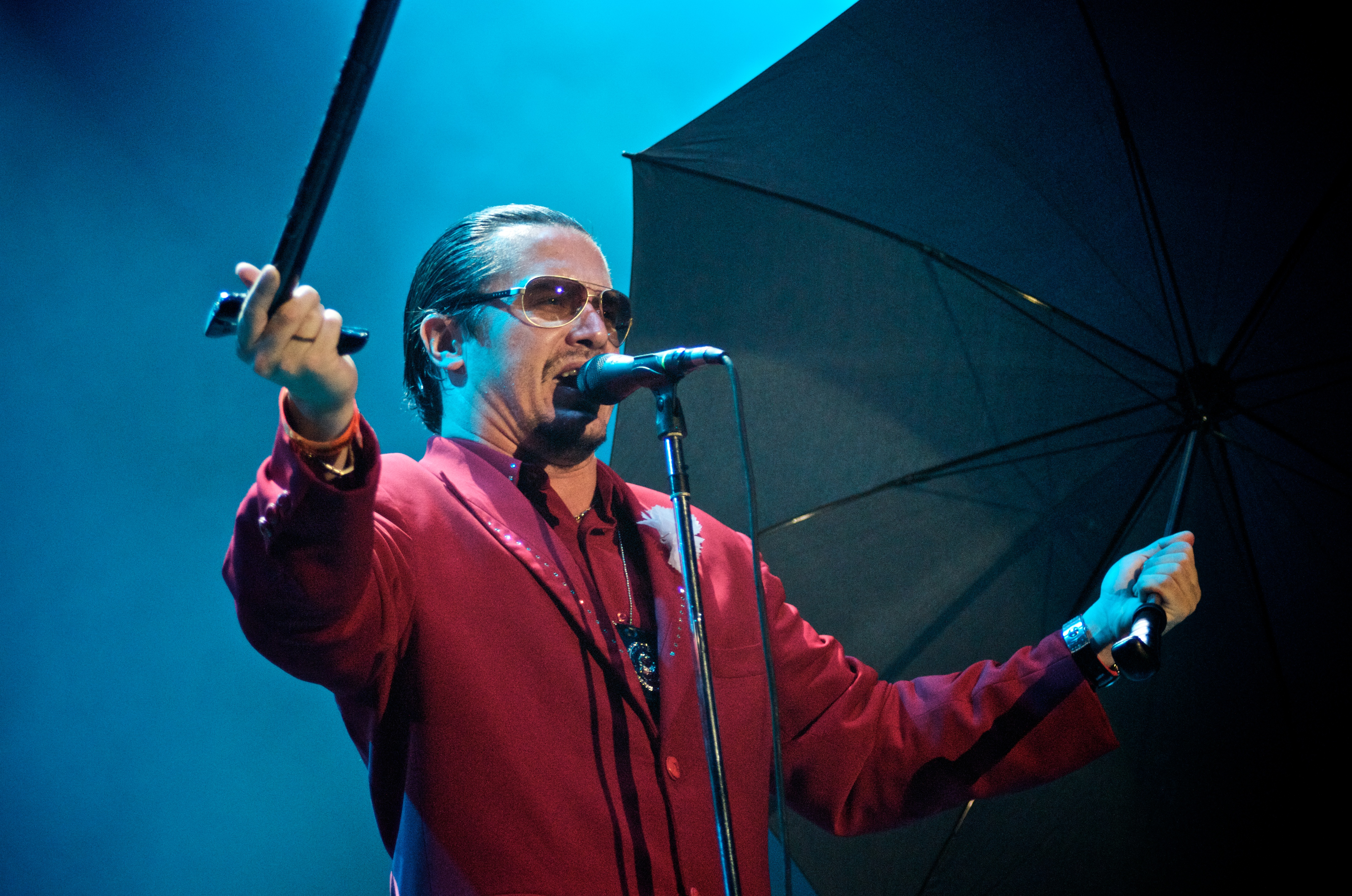
Mike Patton (pictured in 2009) has his first solo writing credit on Angel Dust.

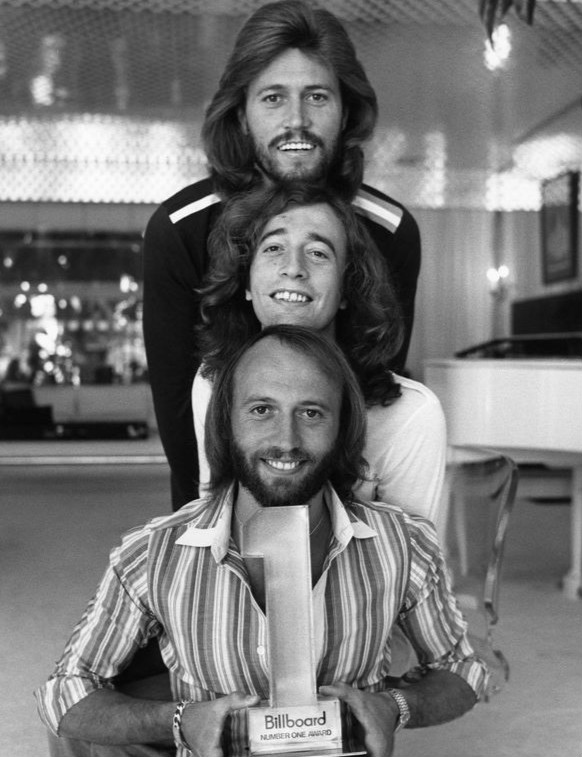
A cover of "I Started A Joke" by the Bee Gees (pictured in 1977) first appeared as a B-side to "Digging the Grave" before itself being released as a single.

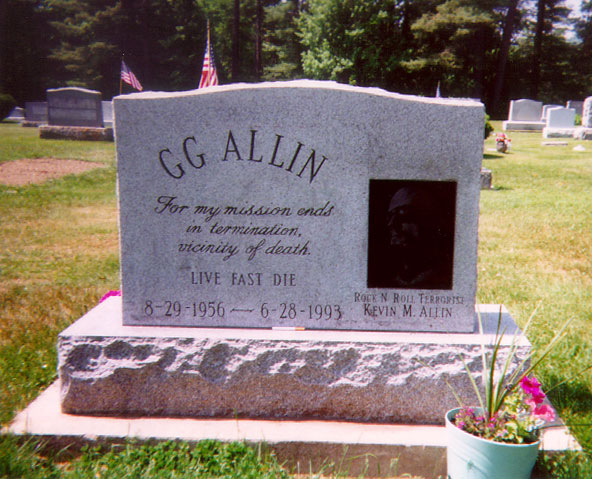
"I Wanna Fuck Myself" by GG Allin (grave pictured) was covered as a B-side to "Ricochet".

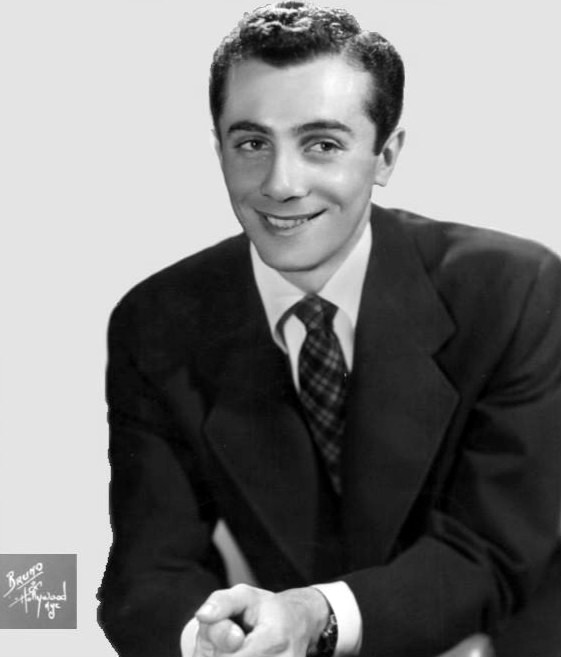
Al Martino's version of "Moon Over Naples", which he recorded with lyrics as "Spanish Eyes", was covered as a B-side to "Ricochet".

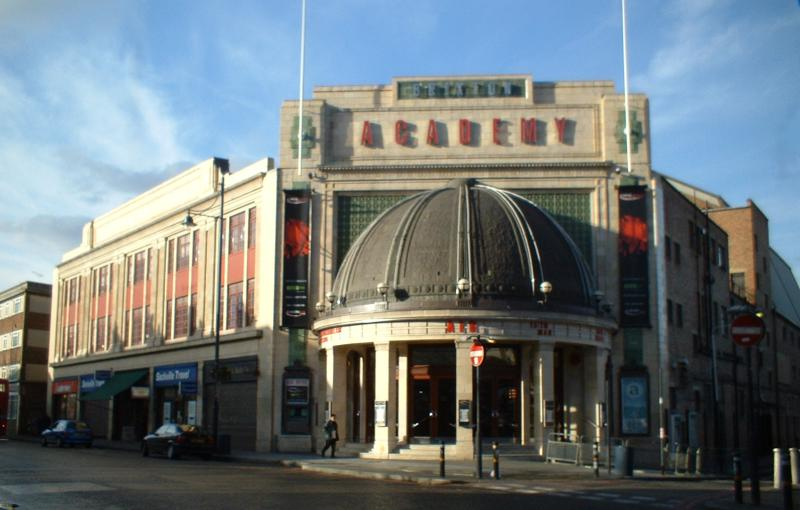
London's Brixton Academy was the site of the band's only live album, 1991's You Fat Bastards: Live at the Brixton Academy.

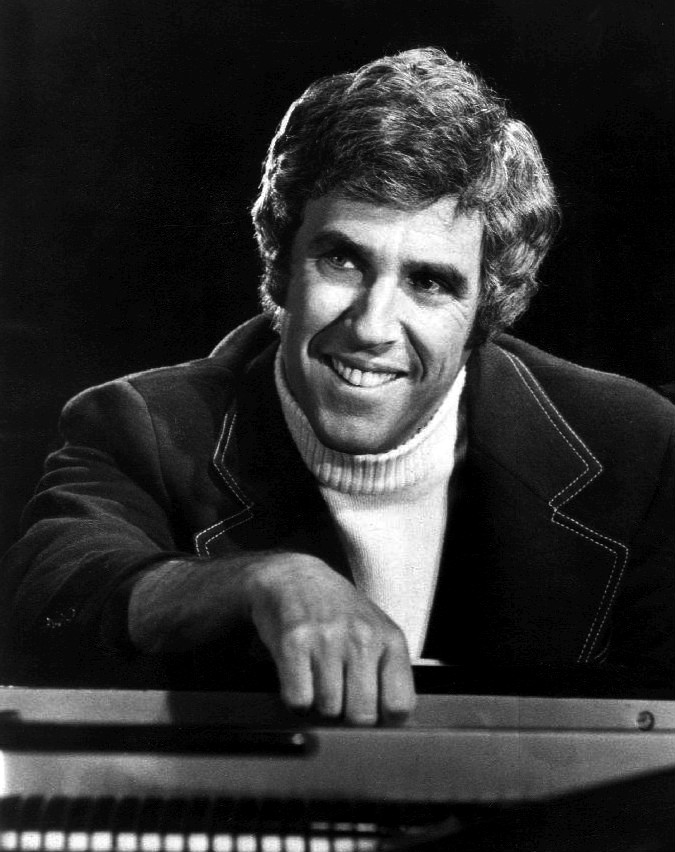
Faith No More recorded a cover version of "This Guy's in Love with You" by Burt Bacharach (pictured in 1972).

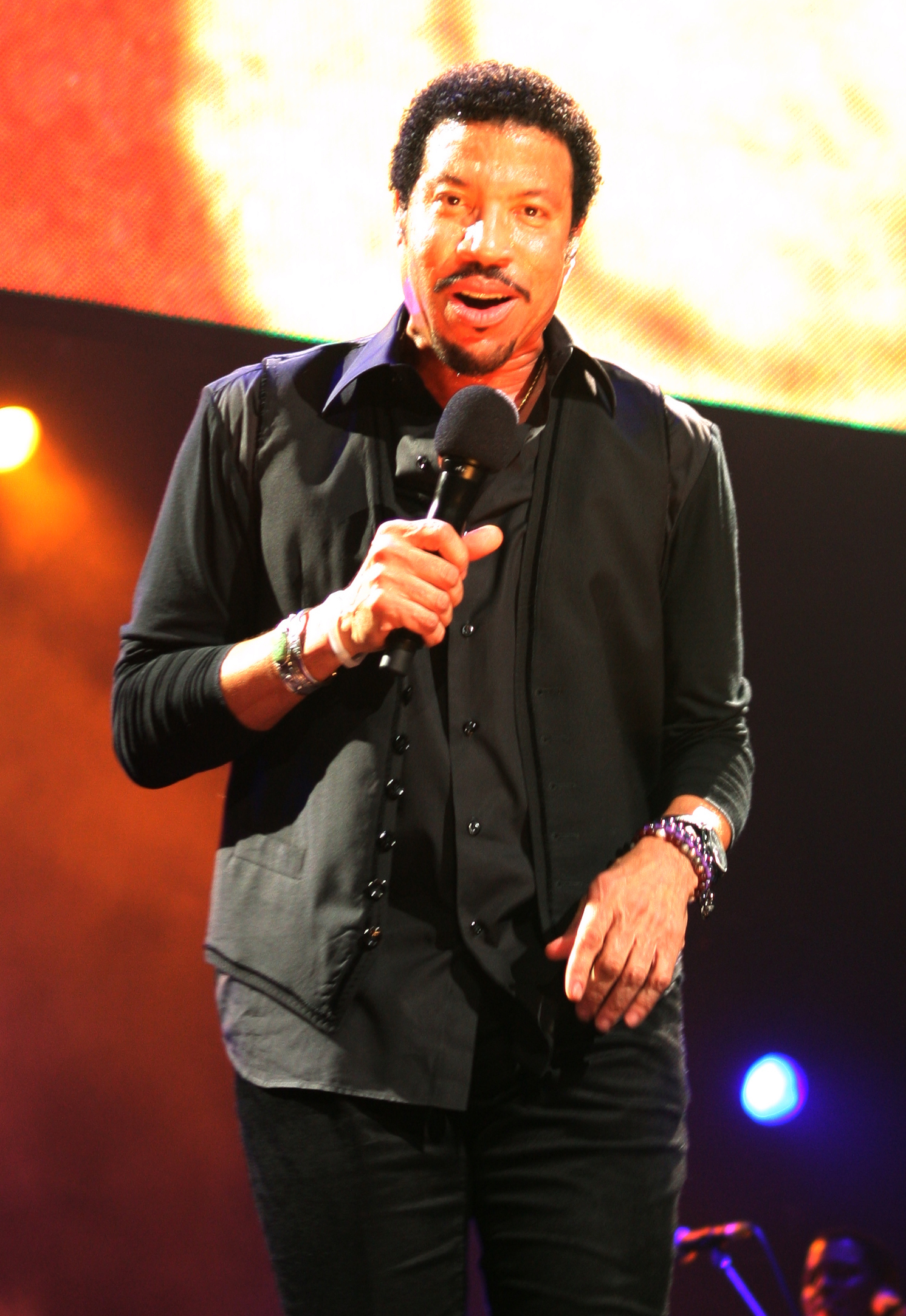
Lionel Richie (pictured in 2011) wrote "Easy", which was covered for Songs to Make Love To.

Key
†	Indicates single release

Song	Credit as writer(s)	Release	Year	Ref(s)
"Absolute Zero"	Patton	"Digging the Grave"	1995	
"Anne's Song" †	Bordin; Bottum; Gould; Martin; Mosley	Introduce Yourself	1987	
"Another Body Murdered" †	Gould; Bordin; Patton; Bottum; Boo-Yaa T.R.I.B.E.	Judgment Night	1993	(Note: Collaboration with Boo-Yaa T.R.I.B.E.)
"Arabian Disco"	Bordin; Bottum; Gould; Martin; Mosley	We Care a Lot	1985	
"As the Worm Turns"	Bordin; Bottum; Gould; Martin; Mosley	We Care a Lot	1985	
"As the Worm Turns"	Gould; Bottum; Mosley	You Fat Bastards: Live at the Brixton Academy	1990	
"As the Worm Turns"	Mosley; Bottum; Gould	Angel Dust & I'm Easy / Das Schutzenfest	1992	
"Ashes to Ashes" †	Patton; Gould; Hudson; Bordin; Bottum	Album of the Year	1997	
"Be Aggressive"	Bordin; Bottum; Gould; Martin; Patton	Angel Dust	1992	
"The Big Kahuna"	Patton; Gould; Hudson; Bordin	"Ashes to Ashes"	1997	
"Black Friday"	Bordin; Bottum; Gould; Hudson; Patton	Sol Invictus	2015	
"Blood"	Bordin; Bottum; Gould; Martin; Mosley	Introduce Yourself	1987	
"Caffeine"	Bordin; Bottum; Gould; Martin; Patton	Angel Dust	1992	
"Caralho Voador"	Patton; Gould; Bordin	King for a Day... Fool for a Lifetime	1995	
"Chinese Arithmetic"	Bordin; Bottum; Gould; Martin; Mosley	Introduce Yourself	1987	
"Collision"	Patton; Hudson	Album of the Year	1997	
"Cone of Shame"	Bordin; Bottum; Gould; Hudson; Patton	Sol Invictus	2015	
"The Cowboy Song"	Faith No More	"From Out of Nowhere"	1989	
"The Crab Song"	Bordin; Bottum; Gould; Martin; Mosley	Introduce Yourself	1987	
"Crack Hitler"	Bordin; Bottum; Gould; Martin; Patton	Angel Dust	1992	
"Cuckoo for Caca"	Patton; Gould; Spruance	King for a Day... Fool for a Lifetime	1995	
"Das Schutzenfest"	Faith No More	Songs to Make Love To	1993	
"Death March"	Bordin; Bottum; Gould; Martin; Mosley	Introduce Yourself	1987	
"Digging the Grave" †	Patton; Gould; Bordin	King for a Day... Fool for a Lifetime	1995	
"Easy" †	Richie	Songs to Make Love To	1993	(Note: Commodores cover)
"Edge of the World"	Bordin; Bottum; Gould; Martin; Patton	The Real Thing	1989	
"Edge of the World"	Gould; Bottum; Patton; Bordin	You Fat Bastards: Live at the Brixton Academy	1990	
"Epic" †	Bordin; Bottum; Gould; Martin; Patton	The Real Thing	1989	
"Epic"	Gould; Bottum; Patton; Bordin; Martin	You Fat Bastards: Live at the Brixton Academy	1990	
"Everything's Ruined" †	Bordin; Bottum; Gould; Martin; Patton	Angel Dust	1992	
"Evidence" †	Patton; Gould; Bordin; Spruance	King for a Day... Fool for a Lifetime	1995	
"Falling to Pieces" †	Bordin; Bottum; Gould; Martin; Patton	The Real Thing	1989	
"Falling to Pieces"	Gould; Bottum; Martin; Patton	You Fat Bastards: Live at the Brixton Academy	1990	
"Faster Disco"	Bordin; Bottum; Gould; Martin; Mosley	Introduce Yourself	1987	
"From Out of Nowhere" †	Bordin; Bottum; Gould; Martin; Patton	The Real Thing	1989	
"From Out of Nowhere"	Gould; Bottum; Patton	You Fat Bastards: Live at the Brixton Academy	1990	
"From the Dead"	Bordin; Bottum; Gould; Hudson; Patton	Sol Invictus	2015	
"The Gentle Art of Making Enemies"	Patton; Gould; Bordin	King for a Day... Fool for a Lifetime	1995	
"Get Out"	Patton	King for a Day... Fool for a Lifetime	1995	
"Got That Feeling"	Patton	Album of the Year	1997	
"The Grade"	Faith No More	"From Out of Nowhere"	1989	
"Greed"	Bordin; Bottum; Gould; Martin; Mosley	We Care a Lot	1985	
"Greenfields"	The Brothers Four	"Digging the Grave"	1995	(Note: The Brothers Four cover)
"Helpless"	Patton; Bordin; Gould	Album of the Year	1997	
"Highway Star"	Lord; Blackmore; Gillan; Paice; Glover	Who Cares a Lot? The Greatest Hits	1998	(Note: Deep Purple cover)
"Hippie Jam Song"	Patton; Gould	Who Cares a Lot? The Greatest Hits	1998	
"Home Sick Home"	Patton	Album of the Year	1997	
"I Started a Joke" †	B. Gibb; R. Gibb; M. Gibb	"Digging the Grave"	1995	(Note: Bee Gees cover)
"I Wanna Fuck Myself"	Allin	"Ricochet"	1995	(Note: GG Allin cover)
"I Won't Forget You"	Patton; Gould	Who Cares a Lot? The Greatest Hits	1998	
"Instrumental"	Patton; Gould; Bottum	Who Cares a Lot? The Greatest Hits	1998	
"Introduce Yourself"	Bordin; Bottum; Gould; Martin; Mosley	Introduce Yourself	1987	
"Jim"	Bordin; Bottum; Gould; Martin; Mosley	We Care a Lot	1985	
"Jizzlobber"	Bordin; Bottum; Gould; Martin; Patton	Angel Dust	1992	
"The Jungle"	Bordin; Bottum; Gould; Martin; Mosley	We Care a Lot	1985	
"Just a Man"	Patton; Gould; Spruance; Bottum	King for a Day... Fool for a Lifetime	1995	
"Kindergarten"	Bordin; Bottum; Gould; Martin; Patton	Angel Dust	1992	
"King for a Day"	Patton; Gould; Spruance; Bordin; Bottum	King for a Day... Fool for a Lifetime	1995	
"Land of Sunshine" †	Bordin; Bottum; Gould; Martin; Patton	Angel Dust	1992	
"Last Cup of Sorrow" †	Patton; Gould	Album of the Year	1997	
"The Last to Know"	Patton; Gould; Bordin	King for a Day... Fool for a Lifetime	1995	
"Let's Lynch the Landlord"	Biafra	Virus 100	1992	(Note: Dead Kennedys cover)
"Light Up and Let Go"	Patton	"Ashes to Ashes"	1997	
"Malpractice"	Bordin; Bottum; Gould; Martin; Patton	Angel Dust	1992	
"Mark Bowen"	Bordin; Bottum; Gould; Martin; Mosley	We Care a Lot	1985	
"Matador"	Bordin; Bottum; Gould; Hudson; Patton	Sol Invictus	2015	
"Midlife Crisis" †	Bordin; Bottum; Gould; Martin; Patton	Angel Dust	1992	
"Midnight Cowboy"	Barry	Angel Dust	1992	(Note: Cover of the Midnight Cowboy score)
"The Morning After"	Bordin; Bottum; Gould; Martin; Patton	The Real Thing	1989	
"Motherfucker" †	Bordin; Bottum; Gould; Hudson; Patton	Sol Invictus	2015	
"Mouth to Mouth"	Patton; Bordin; Gould; Hudson	Album of the Year	1997	
"Naked in Front of the Computer"	Patton	Album of the Year	1997	
"New Beginnings"	Bordin; Bottum; Gould; Martin; Mosley	We Care a Lot	1985	
"New Improved Song"	Faith No More	Sounds Waves 2	1988	(Note: Included on covermount by Sounds)
"Paths of Glory"	Patton; Gould; Hudson; Bordin; Bottum	Album of the Year	1997	
"The Perfect Crime"	Faith No More	Bill & Ted's Bogus Journey: Music from the Motion Picture	1991	
"Pills for Breakfast"	Bordin; Bottum; Gould; Martin; Mosley	We Care a Lot	1985	
"Pristina"	Patton; Gould	Album of the Year	1997	
"Quiet in Heaven" †	Mike Morris	"Quiet in Heaven" / "Song of Liberty"	1982	(Note: Released as Faith. No Man)
"The Real Thing"	Bordin; Bottum; Gould; Martin; Patton	The Real Thing	1989	
"The Real Thing"	Gould; Bottum; Patton; Kamosi; De Quincey	You Fat Bastards: Live at the Brixton Academy	1990	(Note: Features a brief cover of Technotronic's "Pump Up the Jam")
"Ricochet" †	Patton; Gould; Bordin	King for a Day... Fool for a Lifetime	1995	
"Rise of the Fall"	Bordin; Bottum; Gould; Hudson; Patton	Sol Invictus	2015	
"Rn'R"	Bordin; Bottum; Gould; Martin; Mosley	Introduce Yourself	1987	
"RV"	Bordin; Bottum; Gould; Martin; Patton	Angel Dust	1992	
"Separation Anxiety"	Bordin; Bottum; Gould; Hudson; Patton	Sol Invictus	2015	
"She Loves Me Not"	Patton; Gould; Bordin	Album of the Year	1997	
"A Small Victory" †	Bordin; Bottum; Gould; Martin; Patton	Angel Dust	1992	
"Smaller and Smaller"	Bordin; Bottum; Gould; Martin; Patton	Angel Dust	1992	
"Sol Invictus"	Bordin; Bottum; Gould; Hudson; Patton	Sol Invictus	2015	
"Something for the Girl with Everything"	Mael	Plagiarism	1998	(Note: Collaboration with Sparks)
"Song of Liberty" †	Morris	"Quiet in Heaven" / "Song of Liberty"	1982	
"Spanish Eyes"	Kaempfert; Singleton; Snyder	"Ricochet"	1995	(Note: Al Martino cover)
"Spirit"	Bordin; Bottum; Gould; Martin; Mosley	Introduce Yourself	1987	
"Star A.D."	Patton; Gould; Bordin	King for a Day... Fool for a Lifetime	1995	
"Stripsearch" †	Patton; Hudson; Bordin; Gould	Album of the Year	1997	
"Sunny Side Up"	Bordin; Bottum; Gould; Hudson; Patton	Sol Invictus	2015	
"Superhero" †	Bordin; Bottum; Gould; Hudson; Patton	Sol Invictus	2015	
"Surprise! You're Dead!"	Bordin; Bottum; Gould; Martin; Patton	The Real Thing	1989	
"Sweet Emotion"	Patton; Bordin	Kerrang! Flexible Fiend	1989	(Note: Included on covermount by Kerrang!)
"Take This Bottle"	Patton; Gould	King for a Day... Fool for a Lifetime	1995	
"This Guy's in Love with You"	Bacharach; David	Who Cares a Lot? The Greatest Hits	1998	(Note: Burt Bacharach cover)
"This Town Ain't Big Enough for Both of Us" †	Mael	Plagiarism	1998	
"Ugly in the Morning"	Patton; Gould; Spruance	King for a Day... Fool for a Lifetime	1995	
"Underwater Love"	Bordin; Bottum; Gould; Martin; Patton	The Real Thing	1989	
"Underwater Love"	Gould; Bottum; Patton	You Fat Bastards: Live at the Brixton Academy	1990	
"War Pigs"	Butler; Iommi; Osbourne; Ward	The Real Thing	1989	(Note: Black Sabbath cover)
"War Pigs"	Butler; Iommi; Osbourne; Ward	You Fat Bastards: Live at the Brixton Academy	1990	
"We Care a Lot"	Bordin; Bottum; Gould; Martin; Mosley	We Care a Lot	1985	
"We Care a Lot" (Slash Version) †	Bordin; Bottum; Gould; Martin; Mosley	Introduce Yourself	1987	
"We Care a Lot" †	Gould; Bottum; Mosley; Starr	You Fat Bastards: Live at the Brixton Academy	1990	(Note: Features a brief cover of New Kids on the Block's "You Got It (The Right Stuff)")
"What a Day"	Patton; Spruance	King for a Day... Fool for a Lifetime	1995	
"Why Do You Bother"	Bordin; Bottum; Gould; Martin; Mosley	We Care a Lot	1985	
"Woodpecker from Mars"	Bordin; Bottum; Gould; Martin; Patton	The Real Thing	1989	
"Woodpecker from Mars"	Bordin; Martin	You Fat Bastards: Live at the Brixton Academy	1990	
"The World Is Yours"	Faith No More	Who Cares a Lot? The Greatest Hits	1998	
"Zombie Eaters"	Bordin; Bottum; Gould; Martin; Patton	The Real Thing	1989	
"Zombie Eaters"	Gould; Bottum; Patton; Bordin; Martin	You Fat Bastards: Live at the Brixton Academy	1990	

== See also ==
- List of songs recorded by Tomahawk
- Faith No More discography
- Mike Patton discography
