= Faith No More discography =

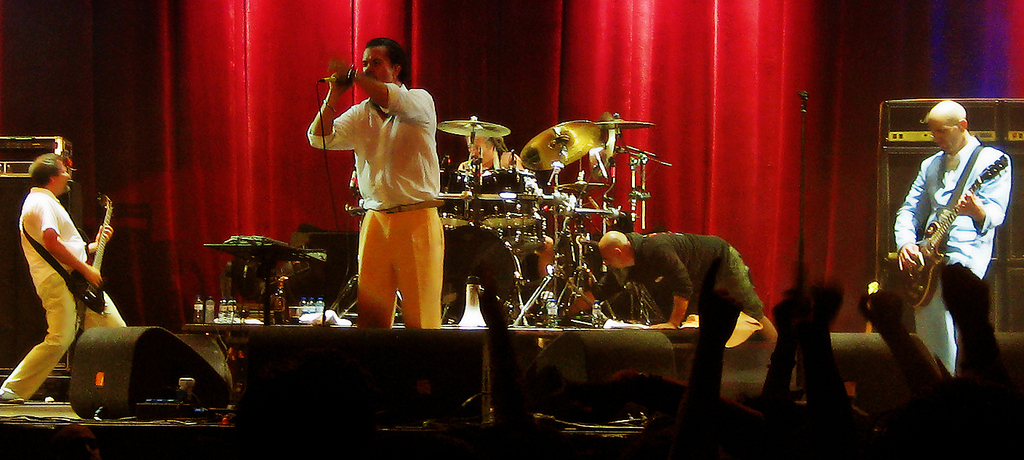
- Faith No More performing in Portugal in 2010
- Studio albums: 7
- Live albums: 1
- Compilation albums: 6
- Singles: 25
- Video albums: 4
- Music videos: 21
- Other appearances: 8

The discography of Faith No More, an American rock group, consists of seven studio albums, 25 singles, one live album, six compilation albums and four video albums.

== Discography history ==
Faith No More's first album was We Care a Lot, released by Mordam Records in 1985. The band soon signed with Slash Records and released Introduce Yourself, their second album, in April 1987. Shortly afterwards the rest of the band fired the vocalist, Chuck Mosley, and replaced him with Mike Patton. During the tour supporting their third album, The Real Thing, Faith No More recorded their only live album, Live at the Brixton Academy, and released their first hit single, "Epic". Their fourth studio album Angel Dust was released in 1992 with their final two number-one singles, "Midlife Crisis", and the Lionel Richie cover "Easy", not included on the initial release of the album. Following the tour supporting Angel Dust and the departure of long-time guitarist Jim Martin Faith No More released their fifth studio album, King for a Day... Fool for a Lifetime, in 1995. Their final studio album until 2015, Album of the Year, released on June 3, 1997, was their only number-one album.

Faith No More disbanded in 1998 and their first compilation album, Who Cares a Lot? The Greatest Hits, was released later on in the same year with their final single before their disbanding, a cover of the Bee Gees song "I Started a Joke", followed by their similarly named music video compilation Who Cares a Lot? The Greatest Videos. In 2003 their second compilation album, This Is It: The Best of, was released followed by Epic and Other Hits in 2005, The Platinum Collection and the DVD compilation Double Feature: Live at the Brixton Academy, London (You Fat Bastards) / Who Cares a Lot? The Greatest Videos in 2006 and the three-disc compilation album The Works in 2008. Two more compilation albums, The Very Best Definitive Ultimate Greatest Hits Collection and Midlife Crisis: The Very Best of Faith No More, were released in 2009 and 2010 respectively.

After an eleven-year hiatus, Faith No More announced a reunion in 2009. They released their seventh studio album, Sol Invictus, which debuted at number 15 on the Billboard 200, higher than their past two studio albums, on May 19, 2015, and toured in support of it.

== Albums ==
=== Studio albums ===
Title	Album details	Peak chart positions										Certifications
Title	Album details	US	AUS	AUT	FIN	GER	NLD	NOR	NZ	SWI	UK	Certifications
We Care a Lot	Released: November 30, 1985; Label: Mordam; Formats: CD, CS, LP, DI	—	—	—	—	—	—	—	—	—	—	
Introduce Yourself	Released: April 23, 1987; Label: Slash; Formats: CD, CS, LP, DI	—	57	—	—	—	—	—	—	—	—	
The Real Thing	Released: June 20, 1989; Label: Slash, Reprise; Formats: CD, CS, LP, DI	11	2	—	16	37	56	—	3	—	30	RIAA: Platinum; ARIA: Platinum; BPI: Silver; MC: Platinum; RMNZ: Gold
Angel Dust	Released: June 8, 1992; Label: Slash, Reprise; Formats: CD, CS, LP, DI	10	4	4	5	8	22	7	6	9	2	RIAA: Gold; ARIA: Gold; BPI: Gold; BVMI: Gold; MC: Platinum; RMNZ: Gold
King for a Day... Fool for a Lifetime	Released: March 13, 1995; Label: Slash, Reprise; Formats: CD, CS, LP, DI	31	2	9	22	8	8	6	3	7	5	ARIA: Gold; BPI: Gold; RMNZ: Gold
Album of the Year	Released: June 3, 1997; Label: Slash, Reprise; Formats: CD, CS, LP, DI	41	1	5	4	2	31	5	1	16	7	ARIA: Platinum
Sol Invictus	Released: May 19, 2015; Label: Reclamation!; Formats: CD, LP, DI	15	2	7	1	4	7	2	6	3	6	
"—" denotes a release that did not chart.

=== Live albums ===
Title	Album details	Peak chart positions	
Title	Album details	AUS	UK
Live at the Brixton Academy	Released: February 4, 1991; Label: Slash; Formats: CD, CS, LP, DI	93	20

=== Compilation albums ===
Title	Album details	Peak chart positions							Certifications
Title	Album details	AUS	AUT	FIN	NOR	NZ	SWI	UK	Certifications
Who Cares a Lot? The Greatest Hits	Released: November 24, 1998; Label: Slash, London, Reprise	4	46	—	26	10	—	37	ARIA: Platinum; BPI: Silver
This Is It: The Best of Faith No More	Released: January 28, 2003; Label: Slash; Reprise; Rhino; Formats: CD, DI	—	—	—	—	—	—	—	
Epic and Other Hits	Released: 2005; Label: Warner Bros.; Formats: CD, DI	—	—	—	—	—	—	—	
The Platinum Collection	Released: January 10, 2006; Label: Warner Strategic Marketing; Formats: CD, DI	—	—	—	—	—	—	38	
The Works	Released: March 31, 2008; Label: Rhino; Formats: CD, DI	—	—	—	—	—	—	—	
The Very Best Definitive Ultimate Greatest Hits Collection	Released: June 8, 2009; Label: Rhino; Formats: CD, DI	—	—	6	—	37	77	128	RMNZ: Gold
MidLife Crisis: The Very Best of Faith No More	Released: September 20, 2010; Label: Music Club Deluxe; Formats: CD, DI	—	—	—	—	—	—	—	
"—" denotes a release that did not chart.

== Video albums ==
Title	Album details	Certifications
You Fat Bastards: Live at the Brixton Academy	Released: August 20, 1990; Label: Slash; Formats: LD, VHS	RIAA: Gold
Video Croissant	Released: February 2, 1993; Label: Slash, Warner Bros.; Formats: LD, VHS	
Who Cares a Lot? The Greatest Videos	Released: February 23, 1999; Label: Slash, Reprise, London, Warner, Polygram; Formats: VHS	
Double Feature: Live at the Brixton Academy, London (You Fat Bastards) / Who Cares a Lot? The Greatest Videos	Released: May 23, 2006; Label: Slash, Reprise, Rhino; Formats: DVD	

== Singles ==
Title	Year	Peak chart positions										Certifications	Album
Title	Year	US	US Alt.	US Main.	AUS	GER	NLD	NOR	NZ	SWI	UK	Certifications	Album
"Quiet in Heaven/Song of Liberty" (as Faith No Man)	1983	—	—	—	—	—	—	—	—	—	—		non-album single
"Chinese Arithmetic"	1987	—	—	—	—	—	—	—	—	—	—		Introduce Yourself
"We Care a Lot"	1987	—	—	—	—	—	—	—	40	—	53		Introduce Yourself
"Anne's Song"	1988	—	—	—	—	—	—	—	—	—	—		Introduce Yourself
"From Out of Nowhere"	1989	—	—	—	83	—	—	—	—	—	23		The Real Thing
"Epic"	1990	9	—	25	1	—	51	—	2	—	25	RIAA: Gold; ARIA: Platinum; BPI: Silver; RMNZ: Platinum	The Real Thing
"Falling to Pieces"	1990	92	—	40	26	—	—	—	16	—	41		The Real Thing
"Surprise! You're Dead!"	1990	—	—	—	—	—	—	—	—	—	—		The Real Thing
"Edge of the World"	1990	—	—	—	—	—	—	—	—	—	—		The Real Thing
"Midlife Crisis"	1992	—	1	32	31	32	36	—	32	—	10	RMNZ: Gold	Angel Dust
"A Small Victory"	1992	—	11	—	84	—	—	—	—	—	29		Angel Dust
"Everything's Ruined"	1992	—	—	—	63	—	—	—	—	—	28		Angel Dust
"Easy" (Note: Known as "I'm Easy" in Europe, the single was released as a double-A side in the United Kingdom, with "I'm Easy" charting in the Top 10 along with "Be Aggressive")	1993	58	—	—	1	20	10	2	6	9	3	ARIA: Platinum; RMNZ: Platinum	Angel Dust
"Another Body Murdered" (with Boo-Yaa T.R.I.B.E.)	1993	—	—	—	—	—	—	—	41	—	26		Judgment Night soundtrack
"Digging the Grave"	1995	—	—	—	12	48	—	11	16	42	16		King for a Day, Fool for a Lifetime
"Ricochet"	1995	—	—	—	58	—	—	—	—	—	27		King for a Day, Fool for a Lifetime
"Evidence"	1995	—	—	—	27	—	42	—	38	—	32		King for a Day, Fool for a Lifetime
"Ashes to Ashes"	1997	—	—	23	8	76	—	14	39	50	15	ARIA: Gold; RMNZ: Gold	Album of the Year
"Last Cup of Sorrow"	1997	—	—	14	66	—	—	—	32	—	51		Album of the Year
"Stripsearch"	1997	—	—	—	83	—	—	—	—	—	—		Album of the Year
"This Town Ain't Big Enough for Both of Us" (with Sparks)	1998	—	—	—	69	—	—	—	—	7	40		Plagiarism
"I Started a Joke"	1998	—	—	—	58	—	—	—	38	—	49		Who Cares a Lot? The Greatest Hits
"Motherfucker"	2014	—	— (Note: "Motherfucker" did not enter the Alternative Songs chart but peaked at number 46 on the Rock Digital Songs chart.)	—	—	—	—	—	—	—	— (Note: "Motherfucker" did not enter the UK Singles Chart but peaked at number five on the UK Rock & Metal Singles Chart.)		Sol Invictus
"Superhero"	2015	—	—	—	—	—	—	—	—	—	—		Sol Invictus
"Cone of Shame"	2016	—	—	—	—	—	—	—	—	—	—		Sol Invictus
"—" denotes a release that did not chart.

== Music videos ==
Title	Year	Director
"We Care a Lot"	1987	Bob Biggs & Jay Brown
"Anne's Song"	1988	Tamra Davis
"From Out of Nowhere"	1989	Doug Freel
"Epic"	1990	Ralph Ziman
"Falling to Pieces"	1990	Ralph Ziman
"Surprise! You're Dead!"	1990	Billy Gould
"Midlife Crisis"	1992	Kevin Kerslake
"A Small Victory"	1992	Marcus Nispel
"Everything's Ruined"	1992	Kevin Kerslake
"Easy"	1992	Barry McGuire
"Another Body Murdered"	1993	Marcus Raboy
"Digging the Grave"	1995	Marcus Raboy
"Ricochet"	1995	Alex Hemming
"Evidence"	1995	Walter Stern
"Ashes to Ashes"	1997	Tim Royes
"Last Cup of Sorrow"	1997	Joseph Kahn
"Stripsearch"	1997	Philip Stolzl
"I Started a Joke"	1998	Vito Rocco
"Sunny Side Up"	2015	Joe Lynch
"Separation Anxiety"	2015	Finch Lynch
"Cone of Shame"	2016	Goce Cvetanovski

== Other appearances ==
Title	Year	Album
"New Improved Song"	1988	Sounds Waves 2
"Sweet Emotion"	1989	Kerrang! Flexible Fiend 3
"The Perfect Crime"	1991	Bill & Ted's Bogus Journey: Music from the Motion Picture
"Let's Lynch the Landlord"	1992	Virus 100
"Another Body Murdered" (with Boo-Yaa T.R.I.B.E.)	1993	Judgment Night: Music from the Motion Picture
"Engove (Caffeine) (Remix)"	1995	Metallurgy
"This Town Ain't Big Enough for Both of Us"	1997	Plagiarism (Sparks)
"Kick Out The Jams"	1997	The Rock'n'Roll Rider Volume No. 2 - Jack Lives Here
