= Who Cares a Lot? The Greatest Videos =

- Who Cares a Lot? The Greatest Videos British and European cover art.

Video by Faith No More
- Released: February 23, 1999
- Recorded: 1986–1998
- Genre: Alternative metal, experimental rock, funk metal, alternative rock, avant-garde
- Length: 89:14
- Label: Slash; Reprise; London; Warner; Polygram
- Director: Various

Faith No More chronology
Who Cares a Lot? The Greatest Hits (1998)	Who Cares a Lot? The Greatest Videos (1999)	This Is It: The Best of Faith No More (2003)

Faith No More video chronology
Video Croissant (1993)	Who Cares a Lot? The Greatest Videos (1999)	Double Feature: Live at the Brixton Academy, London (You Fat Bastards) / Who Cares a Lot? The Greatest Videos (2006)

Alternative cover
- Who Cares a Lot? The Greatest Videos North American cover art.

Who Cares a Lot? The Greatest Videos is a greatest hits retrospective compilation video album by American rock band Faith No More. It was released on video home system following the band's April 1998 breakup and is a companion to the greatest hits album Who Cares a Lot? The Greatest Hits.

The VHS was originally scheduled for release on February 9, 1999, but was delayed to February 23, 1999. It was issued by Slash Records and London Records via Polygram Video in Britain and Europe, and Slash Records and Reprise Records via Warner Reprise Video in North America. In 2006, Rhino Entertainment re-released the video on DVD, packaged as a double disc with You Fat Bastards: Live at the Brixton Academy under the title Double Feature: Live at the Brixton Academy, London (You Fat Bastards) / Who Cares a Lot? The Greatest Videos.

The release contains nearly all of the band's music videos, with the exception of ones for "Ricochet," "Another Body Murdered," and an alternate video for "From Out of Nowhere". The first half of the video is taken directly from Faith No More's 1993 VHS release, Video Croissant (from "Midlife Crisis" to "Easy"), which covered footage from the band's first three Slash Records releases, Introduce Yourself, The Real Thing, and Angel Dust. The second half includes videos from the band's (at the time) final two albums, King for a Day... Fool for a Lifetime and Album of the Year. It also includes a music video for "I Started a Joke," which was produced to promote the Who Cares a Lot? releases in 1998, and a live video of "This Guy's in Love with You," which was performed by the band on their last tour.

== Critical reception ==
Professional ratings
Review scores
Source	Rating
AllMusic	2.5/5 stars

Billboard's Catherine Applefeld Olson describes the release as a collection of "some of the band's most attention-grabbing, groundbreaking clips." She also praises the inclusion of miscellaneous content that "devotees of the band will savor […] like scraps of gold."

Denise Sullivan of AllMusic mainly deplores the track listing order which puts the "worst" music videos "first". However she still notes some "bright spots" on the collection, such as the "uncharacteristically high-budget clip for 'A Small Victory.'"

== Track listing ==
No.	Title	Writer(s)	Director(s)	Length
1.	"Midlife Crisis"	Faith No More	Kevin Kerslake
2.	"Epic"	Faith No More	Ralph Ziman
3.	"Falling to Pieces"	Faith No More	Ralph Ziman
4.	"Anne's Song"	Faith No More	Tamara Davis
5.	"We Care a Lot"	Faith No More	Bob Biggs; Jay Brown
6.	"Surprise! You're Dead!"	Faith No More	Billy Gould
7.	"From Out of Nowhere"	Faith No More	Doug Freel
8.	"A Small Victory"	Faith No More	Marcus Nispel
9.	"Everything's Ruined"	Faith No More	Kevin Kerslake
10.	"Caffeine" (Live on Hangin' with MTV)	Faith No More	MTV
11.	"Easy"	Richie	Barry McGuire
12.	"Digging the Grave"	Bordin; Gould; Patton	Marcus Raboy
13.	"Evidence"	Bordin; Gould; Patton; Spruance	Walter A. Stern
14.	"Stripsearch"	Hudson; Patton; Bordin; Gould	Philip Stoltz
15.	"Last Cup of Sorrow"	Patton; Gould	Joseph Khan
16.	"Ashes to Ashes"	Hudson; Patton; Bordin; Gould; Bottum	Tim Royes
17.	"I Started a Joke"	Gibb; Gibb; Gibb	Vito Rocco
18.	"This Guy's in Love with You" (Live on MTV Europe)	Bacharach; David	MTV
Total length:				1:21:00

- "Stripsearch" and "This Guy's in Love with You" are not listed on the back cover or tape sticker.
- The cover states that the running time is 120 minutes, however, the correct running time is 78 minutes.

== Personnel ==
Credits are adapted from the compilation video album's liner notes.

Faith No More

- Billy Gould – electric bass guitar, backing vocals
- Mike Bordin – drums, congas, backing vocals
- Roddy Bottum – keyboards, backing vocals
- Chuck Mosley – vocals (tracks 4–5)
- Jim Martin – electric guitar, backing vocals (tracks 1–11)
- Mike Patton – vocals (tracks 1–3, 6–18)
- Trey Spruance – electric guitar (audio only, tracks 12–13)
- Dean Menta – electric guitar (tracks 12–13, 17)
- Jon Hudson – electric guitar (tracks 14–16, 18)

Production

- Jigsaw (London) – graphic design
- London Records – packaging design
