= The Platinum Collection (Faith No More album) =

Compilation album by Faith No More
- Released: January 10, 2006
- Recorded: 1986–1997
- Genre: Alternative metal, alternative rock, funk metal
- Length: 72:47
- Label: Warner Strategic Marketing

Faith No More chronology
Epic And Other Hits (2005)	The Platinum Collection (2006)	Double Feature: Live at the Brixton Academy, London (You Fat Bastards) / Who Cares a Lot? The Greatest Videos (2006)

Professional ratings
Review scores
Source	Rating
AllMusic	3.5/5 stars

The Platinum Collection is a compilation album released by Faith No More in 2006.

== Track listing ==
No.	Title	Lyrics	Music	From the album	Length
1.	"From out of Nowhere"	Patton	Gould, Bottum	The Real Thing	3:21
2.	"Epic"	Patton	Gould, Martin, Bottum, Bordin	The Real Thing	4:54
3.	"Falling to Pieces"	Patton	Gould, Bottum, Martin	The Real Thing	5:13
4.	"Midlife Crisis"	Patton	Martin, Bottum, Gould, Bordin	Angel Dust	4:21
5.	"A Small Victory"	Patton	Martin, Gould, Bordin, Bottum	Angel Dust	4:57
6.	"Evidence"	Patton, Gould	Gould, Spruance	King for a Day... Fool for a Lifetime	4:54
7.	"Last Cup of Sorrow"	Patton	Gould	Album of the Year	4:11
8.	"Ricochet"	Patton	Gould, Bordin	King for a Day... Fool for a Lifetime	4:28
9.	"Caffeine"	Patton	Gould, Martin, Bottum, Bordin	Angel Dust	4:27
10.	"Everything's Ruined"	Patton	Gould, Martin, Bottum, Bordin	Angel Dust	4:34
11.	"Kindergarten"	Patton	Gould, Martin, Bottum, Bordin	Angel Dust	4:30
12.	"Underwater Love"	Patton	Gould, Martin, Bottum, Bordin	The Real Thing	3:51
13.	"She Loves Me Not"	Patton	Gould, Bordin	Album of the Year	3:29
14.	"Anne's Song"	Mosley	Gould, Martin, Bottum, Bordin	Introduce Yourself	4:46
15.	"We Care a Lot" (Live at the Brixton Academy)	Mosley, Bottum	Gould, Martin, Bottum, Bordin	Live at the Brixton Academy	3:50
16.	"Edge of the World"	Patton	Gould, Martin, Bottum, Bordin	The Real Thing	4:10
17.	"Easy"	Richie	Richie	Angel Dust	3:09
18.	"I Started a Joke"	B. Gibb, R. Gibb, M. Gibb	B. Gibb, R. Gibb, M. Gibb		3:00
Total length:					72:47

== Personnel ==
- Mike Patton – Vocals
- Chuck Mosley – Vocals
- Jon Hudson – Guitar
- Trey Spruance – Guitar
- "Big" Jim Martin – Guitar
- Billy Gould – Bass
- Roddy Bottum – Keyboards
- Mike Bordin – Drums
- Joe Arditti – Project Manager
- Ben Lister – Compiler

== Charts ==
- UK Albums Chart – 38
