= This Is It: The Best of Faith No More =

Greatest hits album by Faith No More
- Released: January 28, 2003
- Recorded: 1985–1997
- Genre: Alternative rock, experimental rock, alternative metal, funk metal
- Length: 79:32
- Label: Slash; Reprise; Rhino

Faith No More chronology
Who Cares a Lot? The Greatest Videos (1999)	This Is It: The Best of Faith No More (2003)	Epic And Other Hits (2005)

This Is It: The Best of Faith No More is a 2003 best of compilation album by American alternative rock band Faith No More. The compilation was organized by Rhino Records, and was co-released by Slash Records and Reprise Records with Rhino Records, on compact disc on January 28, 2003. Most of the material was already owned via the band's former Slash Records/Warner Music Group releases, but "Arabian Disco" was licensed from Mordam Records through Warner Music and "The Perfect Crime" from Interscope Records through Warner Music.

== Background ==
The release contains 19 signature Faith No More songs from albums and singles released between 1985 and 1997. It is notable for being one of only two (the other being Epic and Other Hits), among numerous Faith No More compilations, to include material from the band's independently released 1985 debut album, We Care a Lot. It also covers material from the band's (at the time) entire span, making it one of the group's more comprehensive retrospectives. Though the booklet's liner notes contains several inaccuracies, it also includes contributions from nearly all of the band members.

The compilation includes four non-studio album songs: "The Cowboy Song," "As the Worm Turns (Live, 1990)," "The Perfect Crime," and "Easy." "The Cowboy Song" and "As the Worm Turns (Live, 1990)" were taken from the band's 1990/1991 live album/video You Fat Bastards: Live at the Brixton Academy, though the former is a studio recording b-side from The Real Thing, recorded in 1988–1989. The latter was professionally recorded during the concert on April 28, 1990, and was included on the video but not the soundtrack release; it was however released on a version of the "Epic" single and was sourced from this release, not from the VHS. "The Perfect Crime" was taken from the then out-of-print soundtrack of the 1991 comedy film Bill & Ted's Bogus Journey (in which guitarist Jim Martin appeared). The band's cover of Commodores' "Easy" was recorded during the Angel Dust session in 1991–1992, but was not released on the original version of the album. Once the song was released as a single in late 1992, it was added as a bonus track to foreign pressings of the album and American re-issues. It is generally considered part of Angel Dust's track listing.

It was the last Faith No More release from Warner Music Group to have been done while the company was still part of Time Warner (later known as AOL Time Warner), as in November 2003 it was announced that a group of private investors were acquiring it. Under the new ownership, Warner Music Group continued to create several more Faith No More compilations in the 2000s.

== Reception ==
Professional ratings
Review scores
Source	Rating
AllMusic	4/5 stars
Classic Rock	4/5 stars
Rolling Stone	3/5 stars

This Is It: The Best of Faith No More was generally positively received. AllMusic rated the album four stars out of five, and described it as "a fine collection of one of hard rock's all-time best", though noted that "longtime fans may squabble about key tracks that are absent". Classic Rock also gave the collection four stars out of five, praising its "unique sexual intensity", and feeling that it represented a "handsome legacy".

== Track listing ==
Credits are adapted from the compilation's liner notes and from ASCAP publishing reports.

No.	Title	Lyrics	Music	Original release	Length
1.	"Arabian Disco"	Bottum; Mosley	Gould; Bordin; Bottum; Mosley; Martin	We Care a Lot	3:18
2.	"We Care a Lot" (Slash version)	Bottum; Mosley	Gould; Bordin; Bottum; Mosley; Martin	Introduce Yourself	4:03
3.	"Anne's Song"	Mosley	Gould; Bordin; Bottum; Mosley; Martin	Introduce Yourself	4:46
4.	"Introduce Yourself"	Bottum; Mosley	Gould; Bordin; Bottum; Mosley; Martin	Introduce Yourself	1:34
5.	"From Out of Nowhere"	Patton	Gould; Bottum	The Real Thing	3:22
6.	"Epic"	Patton	Gould; Bordin; Bottum; Martin	The Real Thing	4:54
7.	"Falling to Pieces"	Patton	Gould; Bottum; Martin	The Real Thing	5:14
8.	"War Pigs"	Butler	Butler; Iommi; Osbourne; Ward	The Real Thing	7:47
9.	"The Cowboy Song"	Patton	Gould; Bordin; Bottum; Martin	You Fat Bastards: Live at the Brixton Academy	5:14
10.	"As the Worm Turns" (Live, 1990)	Mosley	Gould; Bottum; Mosley	You Fat Bastards: Live at the Brixton Academy	2:46
11.	"Midlife Crisis"	Patton	Gould; Bordin; Bottum; Martin; Patton	Angel Dust	4:21
12.	"A Small Victory"	Patton	Gould; Bordin; Bottum; Martin; Patton	Angel Dust	4:57
13.	"Be Aggressive"	Bottum	Gould; Bordin; Bottum; Martin; Patton	Angel Dust	3:42
14.	"Easy"	Richie	Richie	Angel Dust	3:09
15.	"Digging the Grave"	Patton	Gould; Bordin; Patton	King for a Day... Fool for a Lifetime	3:05
16.	"Evidence"	Patton	Gould; Bordin; Spruance	King for a Day... Fool for a Lifetime	4:54
17.	"Last Cup of Sorrow"	Patton	Gould; Patton	Album of the Year	4:21
18.	"Ashes to Ashes"	Patton	Gould; Bordin; Bottum; Patton; Hudson	Album of the Year	3:39
19.	"The Perfect Crime"	Patton	Gould; Bordin; Bottum; Martin	Bill & Ted's Bogus Journey: Music from the Motion Picture	4:25
Total length:					79:32

== Personnel ==
Credits are adapted from the compilation album's liner notes.

Faith No More

- Billy Gould – electric bass guitar, backing vocals
- Mike Bordin – drums, congas, backing vocals
- Roddy Bottum – keyboards, backing vocals
- Chuck Mosley – vocals (tracks 1–4)
- Jim Martin – electric guitar, backing vocals (tracks 1–14, 19)
- Mike Patton – vocals (tracks 5–19)
- Trey Spruance – electric guitar (tracks 15–16)
- Jon Hudson – electric guitar (tracks 17–18)

Production

- Faith No More – producer (tracks 2–19)
- Matt Wallace – producer, mixing engineer, recording engineer (tracks 1–14, 19)
- Steve Berlin – producer (tracks 2–4)
- Andy Wallace – producer, mixing engineer, recording engineer (tracks 15–16)
- Roli Mosimann – producer, mixing engineer (tracks 17–18)
- Billy Gould – producer (tracks 17–18), compilation producer
- David Bryson – mixing engineer (tracks 11–14)
- Jim Verecke – recording engineer (tracks 5–9)
- William Shapland – recording engineer (track 10)
- Clif Norrell – recording engineer (tracks 15–16)
- Daniel Presley – recording engineer (tracks 17–18)
- Michael Bogus – recording engineer (tracks 17–18)
- Adam Greenspan – recording engineer (tracks 17–18)
- Emily Cagan – compilation producer
- John Vassiliou – compilation producer
- Karen Ahmed – compilation producer
- Bill Inglot – remastering
- Dan Hersh – remastering
- John Austin – licensing
- Paul Gargano – liner notes
- Tim Scanlin – liner notes coordination
- Steven Blush – liner notes assistance
- Reggie Collins – discographical annotations
- Cory Frye – editorial supervision
- Amanda Cagan – project assistance
- Kim Kaiman – project assistance
- Leigh Hall – project assistance
- April Milek – project assistance
- Randy Perry – project assistance
- Julie Vlasak – art direction, design
- H. Armstrong Roberts – photography (cover art)
- William Holmes – photography
- Miels Van Iperen – photography
- G. De Sota – photography
- Ken Settle – photography
- Ebet Roberts – photography
- Ed Sirrs – photography
- Nick Hutson – photography
- Andrew Catlin – photography
