= Cowboy Song =

Cowboy Song may refer to:

- "Cowboy Song", a 1976 song by Thin Lizzy from their album Jailbreak
- "The Cowboy Song", the B-side of Public Image Ltd.'s 1978 single "Public Image"
- "Cowboy Song", a 1989 song by Faith No More, originally released as a B-side from the single From Out of Nowhere and then on the 2015 deluxe edition of the album The Real Thing
- "The Cowboy Song", an unreleased 1988–1989 studio track from The Real Thing album by Faith No More released on their official 1990–1991 live album: Live at the Brixton Academy
- "The Cowboy Song", a song written by Amos Stagg, sung by Garth Brooks from his 1993 album In Pieces
- "This Cowboy Song", a 1994 Sting song
- "Cowboy Song", a 1998 song by Blur from the Dead Man on Campus soundtrack.
- "Cowboy Song", a 2015 song by the band Slackeye Slim from the album Giving My Bones to the Western Lands.

== See also ==
- Western music (North America), the style of music sometimes called "cowboy songs"
- Cowboy Songs (disambiguation)
