= Around the Sun (disambiguation) =

Around the Sun is an album and title track by R.E.M. The phrase could also refer to:

- Around the Sun (Jeff Watson album), an album and title track by Jeff Watson
- "Around the Sun", a song by Jim Martin from the album Milk and Blood
