= Milk and Blood =

Studio album by Jim Martin
- Released: October 6, 1997
- Recorded: August 1996 – February 1997
- Genre: Heavy metal
- Length: 60:20
- Label: Steamhammer
- Producer: Jim Martin

Professional ratings
Review scores
Source	Rating
Allmusic	3/5 stars

Milk and Blood is the first solo album by former Faith No More guitarist Jim Martin, released on October 6, 1997. It contains twelve songs, including a cover of The Pogues' song "Navigator" and a re-recording of the Faith No More song "Surprise! You're Dead".

== Track listing ==
No.	Title	Writer(s)	Length
1.	"Disco Dust"	Jim Martin	6:09
2.	"Fear"	Martin	5:17
3.	"Dead"	Martin	4:55
4.	"Loser" (listed as "Fool" in the booklet)	Martin	7:19
5.	"Barsoap Hair"	Martin	2:56
6.	"Mexican Sangwich"	Martin	3:47
7.	"Navigator" (The Pogues cover)	Philip Gaston	2:18
8.	"Around the Sun"	Martin	8:04
9.	"Special Tea"	Martin, Joe Cabral	7:32
10.	"Fatso's World"	Martin, Jason Newsted	5:22
11.	"Surprise! You're Dead" (Faith No More cover)	Martin	2:37
12.	"Hunter Shepherd"		3:48

== Personnel ==
- Jim Martin – guitar, vocals, producer, engineer
- Brent Weeks – bass
- Joe Cabral – drums, back cover
- James Hetfield – backing vocals
