= Cowboy Songs =

Cowboy Songs may refer to:

- Cowboy Songs and Other Frontier Ballads by John A. Lomax, 1920
- Cowboy Songs (Bing Crosby album), 1939
- Cowboy Songs (Michael Martin Murphey album), 1990
- Cowboy Songs (Riders in the Sky album), 1996
- "Cowboy Songs" (song), by George Birge, 2024

== See also ==
- Cowboy Song (disambiguation)
