= We Care a Lot =

Studio album by Faith No More
- Released: November 30, 1985
- Studio: Prairie Sun Studios in Cotati, California
- Genres: Post-punk; alternative metal; funk metal
- Length: 34:51
- Label: Mordam
- Producer: Matt Wallace

Faith No More chronology
We Care a Lot (1985)	Introduce Yourself (1987)

We Care a Lot is the debut studio album by American rock band Faith No More, originally released on November 30, 1985, and distributed through Mordam Records.

On the original vinyl release, the band is credited as "Faith. No More." on the album's liner notes, back cover, and on the record itself.

== Background and recording ==
Before recording We Care a Lot, the band had released the single "Quiet in Heaven/Song of Liberty" in 1983 on Ministry of Propaganda Records. This release was under the name Faith No Man, with the band also releasing a three-song demo in 1982 under the name Sharp Young Men, which contained the songs "Life Is Tough For Me", "Decay" and "Alive". Later in 1983, the band released a cassette tape which included demo recordings and their first show under the Faith No More moniker in October 1983. The following year vocalist Chuck Mosley joined Faith No More, following a string of short lived singers. The band initially started recording We Care Lot without backing from a record label and, after pooling their money, recorded five songs. This gained the attention of Ruth Schwartz (who was then forming the independent label Mordam Records) under which the band (after receiving the finances to do so) finished and released the album. The album cost $6,000 in total to make, with the band contributing the initial $3,000 and the other $3,000 coming from Schwartz. It was the first official release for the label.

In addition to having a small budget, the album was recorded in a short space of time. In a 2015 interview, bassist Billy Gould reflected, "there are probably things we could have done better, but at the same time I think that the performances were pretty damned good. And that had to do with us keeping focused and needing to work within those budget restrictions. We rehearsed quite a lot before we went in to record, so we were ready." It was produced by Matt Wallace, who produced the band's next three major label albums Introduce Yourself, The Real Thing and Angel Dust. Wallace went with the band to Prairie Sound in Cotati, California to record the album, and according to him, it was done over two three-day weekends including mixing. During the recording, Wallace and the band stayed in a one-room loft, which was across the road from the studio they were recording at. Wallace claimed the lower budget influenced the band's overall sound for We Care a Lot, saying in 2015 "the room we were working in didn't have a lot of isolation booths so I had to take Bill's bass and built like an echo chamber like 60 or 100 feet away from the control room. So we stuck his bass there and miked it up. Bill at the time liked to use a Peavey guitar head for bass and it was also solid state, which was really interesting and had quite a bit of punch and bite to it and even though I close-miked it, it still got some of that room ambience and of course we compressed it."

For We Care a Lot, Introduce Yourself and The Real Thing, guitarist Jim Martin used a Flying V guitar and a single Marshall half-stack. Wallace said in 2015, "that's all we had. So it wasn't like we'd [be] like, 'hey, let's try this guitar over here. Let's try that amp over there.'" Wallace added, "i think by the time we got to The Real Thing, he did have a Gibson Les Paul but that's it, man. There was no selection, choices or options. It was like, 'this is what we had and that's what we did.'"

== Music and lyrics ==
Then-new singer Chuck Mosley had an equal role in writing the songs with the other members. In a 2016 interview, he described the writing process as being a "lot of collaboration". While Mosley wrote many of the lyrics, he said that Billy Gould, drummer Mike Bordin and keyboardist Roddy Bottum were the most significant contributors in terms of the music. While playing the album again during an August 2016 concert, Bottum remarked, "they're such weird songs, to us they are. [But] we believed in them so much when we were kids, we were so devoted to this weird sound, and it's really an odd thing. And Chuck was so weird"

One of Mosley's favorite songs from the album to both sing and listen to was "Why Do You Bother", a song he didn't write any music or lyrics for. It has a moody tone and uses atmospheric synthesizer sounds throughout. Mosley claims he came up with the chorus to the title track "We Care a Lot", which includes the line "it's a dirty job but someone's gotta do it". Bottum and Gould were also involved with the writing, with Bottum coming up with the title and the idea to repeatedly chant it throughout the song. Lyrically, it mocks wealthy musicians getting involved with charity initiatives, such as with the Live Aid concert, which occurred in 1985 as a response to a famine in Africa. The lyrics also have various 1980s pop culture references, including the Garbage Pail Kids, Transformers, The Smurfs, Run D.M.C., Madonna and Mr. T. Mosley described its lyrical themes as "just [being about] current events, basically." When Faith No More signed to the Warner-affiliated label Slash, it was re-recorded for their follow-up album Introduce Yourself and released as their first single. This later version of the song was incorrectly listed with the parenthesis "(original version)" on the 1998 compilation Who Cares a Lot? The Greatest Hits. On their next greatest hits album This Is It: The Best of Faith No More (2003), the mistake was corrected, with the parenthesis "(Slash version)" being added to the track. The re-recorded version has Bottum's synthesizers featured less prominently in the mix, and for unknown reasons, also removed the references to The Smurfs, Run D.M.C., Mr. T. and Madonna (who was signed to a Warner-owned label at the time).

Mosley mentioned "Mark Bowen" as being another of his favorites from the record, along with "Why Do You Bother", but noted that it was difficult for him to sing live. The song was titled after an early Faith No More/Faith No Man guitarist of the same name.

The truth behind "the Mark Bowen" song, is that prior to having a permanent singer, the band named their songs after persons, places, or things that were around when the music was formulated, rather than naming them song A or song B, etc. There were no lyrics and therefore no real song name. When the boys sent a tape to LA, so that Chuck could write some lyrics for his upcoming stint as singer, he made up lyrics for the song that was labeled as, "Mark Bowen". I had spent a day or so with Chuck prior to that, but he did not really know me. He just made up a song. I'm happy to have my 15 minutes of fame from that, ha!

— Mark Bowen

"Jim" is a short acoustic interlude that begins with a conversation Jim Martin is having with Mike Bordin. Bordin says to Martin "don't play it", with Martin saying "I'll play it all fucking night". Some believed the words at the beginning have Bordin saying "don't blow it", and Martin responding with "I'll blow it all fucking night". The track "Arabian Disco" is a mix of dance music and heavy metal guitars, with AllMusic calling it a "near dance track", and one of the highlights on the album. It shares a similar title to "Faster Disco", from Faith No More's next album Introduce Yourself, and is one of only three Mosley era songs to have never been sung live by the band's next singer Mike Patton. Among the other three is the album's closing track "New Beginnings", and the Introduce Yourself single "Anne's Song". After roughly 30 years, "Arabian Disco" and "New Beginnings" were finally performed live again in California during August 2016, as part of Faith No More's two show reunion with Chuck Mosley, which was done to celebrate the album's deluxe edition reissue. "Arabian Disco" has been included on the compilations This Is It: The Best of Faith No More, Epic and Other Hits (2005) and Midlife Crisis: The Very Best of Faith No More (2010), despite never having been released as a single. It and "As the Worm Turns" are Faith No More's only recordings from We Care a Lot to have ever been included on any of Warner's compilations for the band, with "As the Worm Turns" being included on Midlife Crisis: The Very Best of Faith No More. The band's other compilations Who Cares a Lot? The Greatest Hits, The Platinum Collection (2006), The Works (2008) and The Very Best Definitive Ultimate Greatest Hits Collection (2009) all featured no recordings from We Care a Lot, despite a few of these compilations having many deep cuts from the band's catalog along with the hit singles. The fact that only "Arabian Disco" and "As the Worm Turns" have ever been included on any of the compilations could possibly be as the result of a deal between the band and Warner.

"As the Worm Turns" opens with a piano solo from Bottum. It is one of the songs on We Care a Lot to have a more straightforward lyrical meaning, with the lyrics revolving around a depressed, unemployed person. The title is a reference to the soap opera show As the World Turns and the phrase "the worm turns", which is used to talk about how a situation can suddenly change so that a person who has been weak, unlucky and unsuccessful can become strong, lucky and successful. In a 2016, Mosley said "As the Worm Turns" was "just social commentary on being responsible for your own situation". He wrote some of the lyrics for the song on stage during early shows with Faith No More, and believed the lyrical themes organically came about through the band's association with the San Francisco punk scene, which he said was more "hippie" and less "hardcore" than the Los Angeles punk scene. Along with the title track, it was one of only two songs from the album that were still being regularly performed with Patton when Faith No More broke up in 1998, and was the last song played at Faith No More's original final show in Portugal during April 1998. The band recorded a studio version with Patton during the sessions for 1992's Angel Dust. This version has a shorter piano solo at the beginning, and also incorporates DJ scratches. Originally, it had only ever been available on a Japanese edition of Angel Dust, and as a B-side for the "Midlife Crisis" single. In a 1992 interview, Gould said they weren't doing much with the re-recorded version out of spite, since they didn't want Mosley to earn any further royalties from the song. In this interview, Gould was referring to how Mosley had tried to sue the band shortly after he left and they experienced success with 1989's The Real Thing, claiming a partnership interest in Faith No More's financial assets. The re-recorded "As the Worm Turns" was eventually included on a 2015 deluxe edition for Angel Dust, which was done by Warner without the band's input, unlike with the 2016 deluxe edition of We Care a Lot.

The track "Greed" lyrically revolves around Chuck Mosley's perceived lack of talent as a singer. It includes the lines "over the hills they came from the valley making innuendos about my lack of talent" and "they say that when I'm supposed to be singing, all I'm really doing is yelling". Ironically, the band's next singer Mike Patton would go on to be listed as having the highest octave range in all of popular music. During Faith No More's original run, Patton only sang "Greed" live once, at an August 1990 show in Kaiserslautern, Germany. This show also included several other Mosley era songs that were almost never played with Patton, including "The Jungle" (which is only known to have been played a single other time with Patton in 1989) and "Faster Disco" (which has never been played with Patton at any other shows). After Faith No More's reunion in 2009, "Greed" was played with Patton during a July 2012 show at the Hammersmith Apollo in London.

== Critical reception ==
Professional ratings
Review scores
Source	Rating
AllMusic	3/5 stars

Craig Lee of the LA Weekly had a positive view of the band's music in January 1986. He described their sound as "basic punky, snotty teen attitude" mixed with "a little post-druggie San Francisco art damage", "a touch of thrash" and "gloom rocker melodicism". He called the title track a "genuine college radio anthem", but added that "there's more to this band than their record novelty tunes, [like] the mystico-metal 'The Jungle', or the angry rebuttal of 'Greed'". Bart Bull at Spin said in June 1986 "they sound like a fresh and unstudied aggregate of the crunch-rock verities—like the Stooges and Sabbath and even the MC5, but already schooled in the pragmatics of arena rock."

Select magazine mentioned the roughness of production in 1990, and said that the music is inexorable and "a lustful marriage of mutoid metal and dancefloor verve that owed nothing to anybody". AllMusic made repeated reference to the absence of future front man Mike Patton, and criticized Chuck Mosley's vocals, calling him "often off-key, fairly monotonous, and colorless" but credited the album for having "lots of attitude", comparing it to early Public Image Ltd works.

=== Legacy and covers ===
Mike Patton labelled the album as "bad hippie music". However, his Mr. Bungle bandmate Trey Spruance was a fan. When Spruance joined Faith No More for their 1995 album King for a Day... Fool for a Lifetime, he suggested that the band return to the sound they had on We Care a Lot.

The title track was interloped on MC Hammer's 1990 song "Prayer", while the Red Hot Chili Peppers covered a snippet of it during a show in 2014. In 1994, snippets of "We Care a Lot" were also covered live by L7, who toured with Faith No More and were labelmates of theirs at Slash Records in the 1990s. Korn released a cover of "We Care a Lot" in 2016, with singer Jonathan Davis also mentioning the album itself as one of his favorites from the band, along with The Real Thing. Korn's cover was originally intended to appear on a 2005 covers album titled Korn Kovers, but the album never got finished. In 2020, a collaborative cover of the song was released, featuring members of Anthrax, Brutal Truth, Czarface, Filter, Korn, Mastodon, Men Without Hats, Quicksand, Refused, Run-DMC, Slaves on Dope and Our Lady Peace. The cover was put together by Slaves on Dope vocalist Jason Rockman, a longtime fan of the band who had also worked as a radio host in Canada.

In 2002, a tribute album for Faith No More called Tribute of the Year was released. It featured covers of "As the Worm Turns" by Yellow #1 and "Why Do You Bother" by New Grenada. The title track was covered by three different bands on the album; Die:schon, Esper's Obsession and Parallax 1. In 2014, a lullaby version of "As the Worm Turns" was released by music collective Twinkle Twinkle Little Rock Star, as part of an album of lullaby covers for Faith No More.

== Track listing ==
=== Original release ===
All tracks are written by Faith No More.

No.	Title	Length
1.	"We Care a Lot"	4:08
2.	"The Jungle"	3:10
3.	"Mark Bowen"	3:33
4.	"Jim"	1:16
5.	"Why Do You Bother"	5:39
6.	"Greed"	3:50
7.	"Pills for Breakfast"	2:59
8.	"As the Worm Turns"	3:11
9.	"Arabian Disco"	3:16
10.	"New Beginnings"	3:46
Total length:		34:51

=== 2016 reissue bonus tracks ===
No.	Title	Length
1.	"We Care a Lot" (2016 mix)	4:10
2.	"Pills for Breakfast" (2016 mix)	2:44
3.	"As the Worm Turns" (2016 mix)	3:12
4.	"Greed" (demo)	3:35
5.	"Mark Bowen" (demo)	3:12
6.	"Arabian Disco" (demo)	3:07
7.	"Intro" (demo)	2:18
8.	"The Jungle" (live at I-Beam SF, 1986)	2:35
9.	"New Beginnings" (live at I-Beam SF, 1986)	3:44

- We Care a Lot – Deluxe Band Edition – Remastered by Maor Appelbaum

== Personnel ==
Personnel taken from We Care a Lot liner notes.

Faith No More

- Mike Bordin – drums
- Roddy Bottum – keyboards
- Bill Gould – bass
- James B. Martin – guitar
- Chuck Mosley – vocals

Production

- Matt Wallace – producer
- Olga Gerrard – artwork, cover, graphics
- Joan Osato – photos

== Release history ==
Year	Region	Format	Label	Catalogue #
1985	United States	Vinyl	Mordam	MDR 1
1985	UK and Europe	Vinyl	Mordam / Southern / Konkurrent	MDR 1
1985	Europe	Vinyl	Mordam / Konkurrent	MDR 1
1987	United States	Cassette	Mordam	MDR 1C
1995	Australia	CD	Liberation	D 19976
1996	Europe	CD	London	828 805-2
1996	UK	Vinyl	London	828 805-1
1996	Japan	CD	London	POCD-1236

While released on vinyl and cassette in 1985, this album would not be released to buy as a CD until 1995 in Australia (on Mushroom Records) as a pink disc for the first pressing, and black disc for the second; this release coincided with the tour for their fifth studio album King for a Day... Fool for a Lifetime, released that year. In 1996, it was reissued on CD, vinyl and cassette in the UK and Japan with slightly modified artwork, one being a purple disc. The CD reissue version of the album can be seen during a scene at a record store in the 1997 film Chasing Amy. In this scene of the film, the records are humorously placed under sections which don't match their genre, with We Care a Lot being placed under the reggae section.

=== 2016 deluxe edition reissue ===
The album was reissued by Koolarrow Records on August 19, 2016, and includes nine additional tracks, including three remixes, four demos and two live recordings from a 1986 show at the I-Beam, San Francisco. It was remastered by Maor Appelbaum.
