= Falling to Pieces =

1990 single by Faith No More

- Artwork for US commercial cassette single

Single by Faith No More

from the album The Real Thing
- B-side: "We Care a Lot" (live); "Underwater Love" (live); "From Out of Nowhere" (live)
- Released: July 2, 1990
- Studio: Studio D (Sausalito, California)
- Genre: Funk metal; alternative metal; power pop
- Length: 5:15
- Label: Slash; Reprise
- Songwriter: Faith No More
- Producer: Matt Wallace

Faith No More singles chronology
"Epic" (1990)	"Falling to Pieces" (1990)	"Edge of the World" (1991)

"Falling to Pieces" is a song by American rock band Faith No More, released in July 1990 as the third single from the band's third studio album, The Real Thing (1989). It peaked at No. 80 and 92 on the US Cash Box Top 100 and Billboard Hot 100 charts, and at No. 40 on Billboard's Album Rock Tracks chart.

== Live performances ==
Despite its success, the song did not go on to be a live staple. The song appeared very rarely in concerts after their appearance at the 1993 Phoenix Festival, where Billy Gould announced, "This is the last time we'll ever play this song again" right before the song. During Second Coming Tour, the band picked up the song again and performed it at least once at a concert in Rio de Janeiro in 2009. The song was performed at the Open'er Festival in 2014 for the first time since 2009. In a 2016 interview, Gould stated, "That song sucks, let's face it. I don't know, we don't groove on that one. Also, when you play it live, it just kind of gets boring".

== Music video ==
A screenshot from the Ralph Ziman-directed 1990 music video.

The bass-driven song spawned a video directed by Ralph Ziman (who also directed the video for "Epic"), in which lead singer Mike Patton wears a series of different outfits, including one resembling Alex from the Stanley Kubrick film A Clockwork Orange. Billy Gould wears various death metal band shirts during the video including Carcass and, at the time, Sepultura. The video is also notable for using a different mix of the song featuring more prominent background vocals, keyboards, and a guitar solo during the fade out.

There is also another lesser known music video which uses clips from the Brixton Academy performance, played with the album version of the song.

== Covers and legacy ==
In 2014, a lullaby version of "Falling to Pieces" was released by music collective Twinkle Twinkle Little Rock Star, as part of an album of lullaby covers for Faith No More. The song "Rubber Mallet", from Alien Ant Farm's 2003 album Truant, has the line "indecision breaks my vision", which is believed to be a reference to a line from "Falling to Pieces".

== Track listings ==
Disc one

1. "Falling to Pieces" – 3:39
2. "We Care a Lot" (live at Brixton) – 3:59
3. "Underwater Love" (live at Brixton) – 3:32
4. "From Out of Nowhere" (live at Brixton) – 3:47

Disc two

1. "Falling to Pieces" (re-mix)
2. "Zombie Eaters"
3. "The Real Thing" (live)

Notes

- The Brixton Academy live tracks are different mixes to those found on the LP of the concert, most notably including the line "About the smack and crack and whack that hits the streets" on "We Care a Lot", which is mostly muted on the LP mix.
- "The Real Thing" was recorded live at the Wireless on July 30, 1990 also, features ad-lib from Public Enemy's "911 Is a Joke".

== Personnel ==
Personnel are taken from The Real Thing liner notes.

- Mike Bordin – drums
- Roddy Bottum – keyboards
- Billy Gould – bass
- James Martin – guitars
- Mike Patton – vocals

== Charts ==
Chart (1990)	Peak position
Australia (ARIA)	26
New Zealand (Recorded Music NZ)	16
UK Singles (Official Charts)	41
US Billboard Hot 100	92
US Mainstream Rock Airplay (Billboard)	40
US Cash Box Top 100	80

== Release history ==
Region	Date	Format(s)	Label(s)	Ref.
United Kingdom	July 2, 1990	7-inch vinyl; 12-inch vinyl	Slash; London	
Australia	September 10, 1990	7-inch vinyl; 12-inch vinyl; cassette	Slash; Liberation	
Japan	March 1, 1991	CD	Slash; London	
