= You Fat Bastards: Live at the Brixton Academy =

Video and live album by Faith No More
- Released: September 11, 1990
- Recorded: April 28, 1990
- Venue: Brixton Academy (London)
- Genre: Alternative metal; funk metal
- Length: 58:28
- Label: Slash; London; Reprise; Rhino
- Director: John Booth
- Producer: Jessica Barford

Faith No More chronology
You Fat Bastards: Live at the Brixton Academy (1990)	Video Croissant (1993)

Alternative covers
- Cover of the promo EP

Professional ratings
Review scores
Source	Rating
AllMusic	2.5/5 stars

You Fat Bastards: Live at the Brixton Academy is a live video album and the only officially released live album by American rock band Faith No More. It was recorded at the Brixton Academy, London, on April 28, 1990, during the tour supporting their third studio album, The Real Thing (1989). The album takes its title from a line from an English football chant, which was sung by the crowd at the show.

It was released as a live video album on September 11, 1990, and as an audio only version, under the name of Live at the Brixton Academy, in the UK, on February 4, 1991, with two bonus tracks from The Real Thing sessions. The bonus tracks "The Grade" and "The Cowboy Song" were previously released on the "From Out of Nowhere" 12-inch single but were added to this version in order for them to be available on CD. As a result, they do not appear on the vinyl release of Live at the Brixton Academy. The performance of the Black Sabbath song "War Pigs" was later included on the 1994 Black Sabbath tribute compilation Nativity in Black, making it the album's only live track. The reason for including this version, instead of the studio version from The Real Thing album, is unclear.

The video version was later released on a 2-disc DVD set with the video compilation Who Cares a Lot? The Greatest Videos.

== Track listing ==
International video track list
No.	Title	Length
1.	Untitled (Intro)	0:53
2.	"From Out of Nowhere"	3:26
3.	"Falling to Pieces"	4:57
4.	"The Real Thing"	7:40
5.	"Underwater Love"	3:29
6.	"As the Worm Turns"	2:36
7.	"Edge of the World"	5:18
8.	"We Care a Lot"	4:04
9.	"Epic"	4:46
10.	"Woodpecker from Mars" (Instrumental)	5:30
11.	"Zombie Eaters"	6:15
12.	"War Pigs"	9:21

UK audio track list
No.	Title	Length
1.	"Falling to Pieces"	4:47
2.	"The Real Thing"	7:53
3.	"Epic"	4:55
4.	"War Pigs"	6:58
5.	"From Out of Nowhere"	3:24
6.	"We Care a Lot"	3:50
7.	"Zombie Eaters"	6:05
8.	"Edge of the World"	5:50
9.	"The Grade" (Instrumental, from The Real Thing sessions (Not on vinyl edition))	2:05
10.	"The Cowboy Song" (From The Real Thing sessions (Not on vinyl edition))	5:12

Performance set list
No.	Title	Length
1.	"From out of Nowhere"
2.	"Falling to Pieces"
3.	"Introduce Yourself"
4.	"The Real Thing"
5.	"Underwater Love"
6.	"As the Worm Turns"
7.	"The Crab Song"
8.	"Edge of the World"
9.	"The Morning After"
10.	"Chinese Arithmetic"
11.	"We Care a Lot"
12.	"Surprise! You're Dead!"
13.	"Epic"
14.	"Woodpecker From Mars"
15.	"Zombie Eaters"
16.	"Why Do You Bother"
17.	"War Pigs"
18.	"Easy"

== 4 Live from 5 Fat Bastards ==
The promotional version contained four tracks from the same recording. Some rare copies of it came with a rubber fish, a reference to the music video for "Epic" which apparently Mike Patton was unaware of.

Track list
No.	Title	Length
1.	"Epic"
2.	"Zombie Eaters"
3.	"Edge of the World"
4.	"The Real Thing"

== Personnel ==
Faith no More

- Mike Patton (credited as Michael Patton) – vocals
- Jim Martin – guitar
- Billy Gould – bass
- Roddy Bottum – keyboards
- Mike Bordin – drums

Production

- Matt Wallace – mixing, producer on "The Grade" and "The Cowboy Song"
- Jessica Barford – producer
- John Booth – director
- Will Shapland – engineer

== Certifications ==
Region	Certification	Certified units/sales
United States (RIAA)	Gold	50,000^{^}
^{^} Shipments figures based on certification alone.
