= Introduce Yourself =

- Standard artwork

Studio album by Faith No More
- Released: April 23, 1987
- Recorded: 1986
- Studios: Studio D in Sausalito, California; Ground Control Studios in Los Angeles, California
- Genres: Alternative metal; funk metal; rap metal
- Length: 37:42
- Labels: Slash; Warner Bros.
- Producers: Matt Wallace; Steve Berlin; Faith No More

Faith No More chronology
We Care a Lot (1985)	Introduce Yourself (1987)	The Real Thing (1989)

Alternative covers
- Artwork for US CD and digital releases

Singles from Introduce Yourself
- 1. "Chinese Arithmetic" Released: November 1987; 2. "We Care a Lot" Released: January 18, 1988; 3. "Anne's Song" Released: May 18, 1988

Introduce Yourself is the second studio album and major label debut by American rock band Faith No More, released in 1987. Due to the limited availability of the first album, We Care a Lot (until it was re-released on CD years later), many, including the band, once considered this Faith No More's true debut album. Being the group's major label debut, this album features better production than its predecessor, which is most evident on this album's version of the song "We Care a Lot," which is a re-recorded version of the title track from We Care a Lot. It is the final album to feature vocalist Chuck Mosley before he was fired from Faith No More in 1988.

"We Care a Lot" and "Chinese Arithmetic" were released as radio singles in the fall of 1987, in promotion of a tour with the Red Hot Chili Peppers. Music videos were later made for the songs "We Care a Lot" (released in January 1988) and "Anne's Song" released (released in May 1988).

== Background and recording ==
Faith No More's debut album We Care a Lot was released in 1985 through independent label Mordam Records. In late 1986, Faith No More was signed to Los Angeles label Slash Records by Anna Statman. The label had entered a distribution deal with Warner Bros. Records in 1982, ensuring a widespread release, distribution and marketing for the band's forthcoming album.

Introduce Yourself was produced with Matt Wallace, who also produced the We Care a Lot album. It was jointly recorded at Studio D in Sausalito, California and at Ground Control Studios, which was located in the Koreatown neighborhood of Los Angeles, California. While recording at Ground Control, the band stayed at the Tropicana Motel. The motel was used by many visiting musicians, and was demolished just a year after the band recorded Introduce Yourself. Since the motel was located in a crime-ridden area, the doors had electric locks at that time. Wallace said in 2015 that "[we] were out of our elements" recording in Los Angeles, since he and the members lived in the San Francisco area at the time. Wallace described the Tropicana as "pretty sketchy", and recalled that he stayed in the same room with guitarist Jim Martin and drummer Mike Bordin. This mirrored the recording of We Care a Lot, as Wallace had also stayed in a loft with the band while recording that album in Cotati, California. Wallace said, "I've never done that with any other band where we all slept together and worked together. We had a rental car and we drove to Ground Control together and that's kind of what we did." Wallace claimed one of the only rowdy things they did at the Tropicana was throwing lawn chairs into the motel's pool. The motel manager caught Martin and Wallace doing this and made them pay $400, in addition to forcing them to get the chairs out of the pool. Bassist Billy Gould also found the circuit breakers for the motel, and did a prank on the motel's staff where he turned the electricity and lights off, leaving them temporarily locked in their offices. Regarding the recording, Wallace reflected, "we weren't drinking or doing a bunch of weird stuff or at least I wasn't anyway. We were just kind of down there to work. Although I will say Chuck did get into something that got him pretty out of his mind during one of the days at Ground Control. He was absolutely just out of it." Wallace added that Mosley was high on "something or another" when they recorded the song "Death March". It included a spoken word skit at the beginning where Mosley is complaining about not having enough money for a bus, and wanting to skate to the beach.

=== Songs ===
The re-recorded version of "We Care a Lot" features updated, more topical, lyrics, and removes references to Madonna, Mr. T, Run D.M.C. and The Smurfs. In 2009, Chuck Mosley would go on to re-record the song again for his band Chuck Mosley and VUA and their album Will Rap Over Hard Rock for Food. This third version again had updated, topical lyrics, with Mosley saying in 2016 that the song's overall lyrical focus was on topical events. The title track "Introduce Yourself" was originally called "The Cheerleader Song". It was written on Faith No More's first nationwide tour of the United States in 1986, as they were on their way from South Dakota to Portland, Oregon, and driving through Missoula, Montana. Keyboardist Roddy Bottum became inspired to write the song when the band went to a truck stop for coffee. He came up with the lyrics on the next leg of the journey, while sitting in the passenger seat of the band's Dodge.

Regarding the song "Death March", singer Chuck Mosley said in 1988, "A friend of mine, doing a lot of drugs, just went out in the ocean and drowned. I used to be on the beach all the time and I got the feeling that he was so fucked up when he drowned that he doesn't even realise he's dead. He's out there, still swimming around. 'Death March' is someone talking to their dead lover, the soul lingering on."

Unlike with the band's prior release We Care a Lot, much of the album has been played regularly with Mosley's replacement, Mike Patton. However, there is only one known performance of "Faster Disco" with Patton on vocals, at a 1990 concert in Kaiserslautern, Germany. "Anne's Song" is one of three Mosley songs to have never been sung live by Patton, with the others being "Arabian Disco" and "New Beginnings", both from We Care a Lot. A reason it has never been performed with Patton could be due to its personal lyrical themes. Lyrically, "Anne's Song" revolves around a friend of Mosley named Anne D'Agnillo. She was originally from New York, with Mosley meeting her and her boyfriend in Los Angeles, Mosley said that, "she has always been a good friend — someone to call for advice." He added that, "[whenever] I'd get all upset or emotional or whatever, she would talk to me and tell me how easy everything can be. Just a pep talk, basically." Mosley still kept in touch with D'Agnillo up until his death in 2017. After 28 years of not being played, Faith No More performed the song with Mosley during two Californian shows in August 2016. These shows were done to celebrate the deluxe edition reissue of their debut We Care a Lot.

The closing track "Spirit" originated several years prior to the album's recording. An early version with different instrumentation was performed at an October 11, 1983 concert in San Francisco. This was the band's first ever show under the "Faith No More" moniker; the concert was released as part of a 1983 demo cassette called Faith. No More., which also had some early studio recordings. This original live version had much more prominent keyboard parts than the eventual album version, and is missing several of the lyrics from the album version as well. The version on Introduce Yourself has the lyric "She looked at me and did the bosa nova / I smiled at her and then just walked away / Then the lights came on and it was over / To my surprise, she wasn't a girl at all", which could possibly refer to an encounter with a transvestite woman. The lyrics also mention "the bosa nova" as if it were a dance or an action, when it typically refers to a musical genre originating in Brazil. Ironically, Faith No More would later end up recording a song in that style called "Caralho Voador", which appeared on 1995's King for a Day... Fool for a Lifetime.

=== Touring and promotion ===
After the album's release, Faith No More joined fellow funk metal/punk band Red Hot Chili Peppers on The Uplift Mofo Party Tour. Faith No More opened for the Red Hot Chili Peppers during the first two and a half months of the North American tour. Guitarist Jim Martin recalled: "We were travelling in a box van with no windows. We drove all the way to the east coast for the first show. Flea asked me if we liked to smoke weed. I said: ‘Yes’ and he said: ‘We're going to get along just fine’. We did something like 52 dates in 56 days." The band's future singer Mike Patton later became involved in several controversies and disputes with Anthony Kiedis, frontman of the Red Hot Chili Peppers. To further promote the album, Faith No More embarked on their first tour of the UK in 1988.

== Release history ==
The album was originally released in April 1987 on vinyl and cassette. The album cover for this release is a centered ink splatter, with text to the extremes of the cover. The tape has a larger smear of the ink that looks more like a green spot. Bassist Billy Gould's initial idea was a red splatter, but the color was then changed at the request of the record label. The second release of this album was on November 15, 1996, through Slash/Uni Records, and also featured the centered ink splatter. The last North American release of this album was on October 17, 2000, through Slash/Rhino Records; they later released This Is It: The Best of Faith No More in 2003. This version has a close-up of the ink splatter with the wording a bit further from the edges.

Vinyl release history

Region	Label	Catalogue #
USA	Slash	9 25559-1
UK	Slash, London	SLAP 21
Germany	Slash, London	828 051-1
France	Slash, London, Barclay	828 051-1
Holland	Slash, London, Barclay	828 051-1
Australia	Slash, Liberation	LIB5095

Cassette release history

Region	Label	Catalogue #	Pressing	Notes
USA	Slash	9 25559-4	First	"Green Splatter" cassette sleeve
UK	Slash, London	SMAC 21	First	
Germany	Slash, London	#?	First	
France	Slash, London	#?	First	
Australia	Slash, Liberation	#?	First	
USA	Slash	#?	Second	yellow profile cassette sleeves

CD release history

Region	Label	Catalogue #	Pressing	Notes
USA	Slash	9 25559-2	First	white profile sleeves
Canada	Slash	CD25559	First	
UK	Slash, London	828 051-2	First	
Germany	Slash, London	828 051-2	First	
France	Slash, London	828 051-2	First	
Australia	Slash, Liberation	D19617	First	
Japan	Slash, London	POCD-1022	First	Comes with Japanese discography, lyric pamphlet and bonus picture
USA	Slash	9 25559-2	Second	yellow profile sleeves
Australia	Polydor, Slash, London	828 051-2	Second	Polydor generation re-release
Canada	Slash	CD25559	Second	
USA	Slash, London	422-828 051-2	Third	PolyGram generation re-release
Canada	Slash, London	422-828 051-2	Third	
UK	Slash, London	3984 28201-2	Third	

== Reception ==
Professional ratings
Review scores
Source	Rating
AllMusic	4/5 stars
The Rolling Stone Album Guide	3/5 stars

The record has garnered positive reviews from music critics, although as with the band's previous studio effort We Care a Lot, some criticisms have been directed at vocalist Chuck Mosley. AllMusic stated that "the album is consistent and interesting, with Mosley's out-of-tune vocals being an acquired taste to most". In 1988, Neil Perry of Sounds Magazine referred to the album as "a breathtaking harmonisation of molten metal guitar, deadly dance rhythms and poignant, pointed lyrics".

=== Legacy ===
Producer Matt Wallace claimed it was an "overlooked FNM record" in 2016. Louder Sound wrote in 2020, "Introduce Yourself is an irresistibly charming record [...] In the same way that Paul Di'Anno’s voice on early Iron Maiden sounds lovably rugged when contrasted with their slick later work, Chuck Mosely’s goofy, purposefully-underachieving vocals smother these songs in a huge dollop of infectious playfulness – something that Patton’s studied delivery could never quite emulate." While Mike Patton dismissed the band's debut We Care a Lot as "bad hippie music", he has admitted to having a fondness for Introduce Yourself.

The Introduce Yourself version of "We Care a Lot" has been used in various forms of media, including films, television shows, commercials and soundtrack albums. It appeared on the '80s-themed soundtrack album for the 1997 film Grosse Pointe Blank, in addition to appearing within the film itself. It also appeared within the 1996 Pauly Shore comedy film Bio-Dome, but wasn't included on that film's soundtrack album. It later appeared in the 2023 Marvel film Guardians of the Galaxy Vol. 3 (in addition to being included on the film's soundtrack album), and was the opening theme for the television series Dirty Jobs in 2003. In 2022, it was used in an Alaska Airlines commercial.

== Track listing ==
All lyrics are written by Chuck Mosley, except where noted; all music is composed by Faith No More.

No.	Title	Lyrics	Length
1.	"Faster Disco"		4:16
2.	"Anne's Song"		4:46
3.	"Introduce Yourself"	Mosley; Roddy Bottum	1:32
4.	"Chinese Arithmetic"		4:37
5.	"Death March"		3:02
6.	"We Care a Lot"	Mosley; Bottum	4:02
7.	"R n' R"		3:11
8.	"The Crab Song"		5:52
9.	"Blood"		3:42
10.	"Spirit"		2:52
Total length:			37:42

== Personnel ==
Personnel taken from Introduce Yourself liner notes.

Faith No More

- Mike Bordin – drums, congas, backing vocals
- Roddy Bottum – keyboards, backing vocals
- Billy Gould – bass, backing vocals
- Jim Martin – guitar, backing vocals
- Chuck Mosley – lead vocals

Additional personnel

- Steve Berlin – producer
- Matt Wallace – producer, engineer
- Faith No More – producers
- Jim "Watts" Verecke – assistant engineer
- John Golden – mastering
- Lendon Flanagan – photography
- Bob Biggs – artwork
- Jeff Price – artwork

== Accolades ==
Year	Publication	Country	Accolade	Rank
1987	Sounds	United Kingdom	"Albums of the Year"	Unordered
