= We Care a Lot (song) =

Song/single by Faith No More

Song by Faith No More

from the album We Care a Lot
- Released: November 1985
- Studio: Prairie Sun (Cotati, California)
- Genre: Funk metal; rap metal
- Length: 4:08
- Label: Mordam
- Songwriter: Faith No More
- Producers: Matt Wallace; Faith No More

"We Care a Lot"
- Artwork for European single release

Single by Faith No More

from the album Introduce Yourself
- Released: January 18, 1988
- Genre: Funk metal; rap metal
- Length: 4:02
- Label: Slash
- Composer: Faith No More
- Lyricists: Chuck Mosley; Roddy Bottum
- Producers: Matt Wallace; Steve Berlin; Faith No More

Faith No More singles chronology
"Chinese Arithmetic" (1987)	"We Care a Lot" (1988)	"Anne's Song" (1988)

Music video
- "We Care a Lot" on YouTube

Audio
- "We Care a Lot" on YouTube

"We Care a Lot" is a song by American rock band Faith No More. There are three versions of the song, all of which have been officially released on three different albums. The original was released on the band's debut studio album, We Care a Lot (1985). A re-recorded version, with new lyrics, was included on the album Introduce Yourself (1987) and was the lead single, reaching No. 53 on the UK Singles Chart. The live version, with Mike Patton on vocals, was included on the live album and video Live at the Brixton Academy (1990) and released as a single in 1991.

It was the second most frequently-played song during the band's live performances, behind "Epic". "We Care a Lot" featured different lyrics and ad-libs when performed by Mike Patton, much like performances of "Chinese Arithmetic".

== Production ==
The original version of the song was one of the first five songs finished for We Care a Lot, recorded before the band received financial backing for the album, at Prairie Sun Studios in Cotati, California, and was re-recorded, with some updated lyrics, for their second studio album and major label debut, Introduce Yourself.

== Lyrical content ==
The lyrics of the song are a sarcastic parody of charity concerts such as Live Aid, especially "the popstar posing that accompanied those charitable events", according to Steve Huey of AllMusic. The song lists a range of things about which the band sarcastically claims "we care a lot", such as the LAPD, the "food that Live Aid bought", the Garbage Pail Kids and even The Transformers. The original version, released in 1985, mentions Madonna and Mr. T. This was altered for social relevance in the 1987 re-release. When asked about the song's meaning, Chuck Mosley replied:

Well, ah Roddy wrote all the things that he cared about and I just wrote the part that says, "it's a dirty job but someone's gotta do it" 'cause I figured that's just the feeling I got. That's the only thing I submitted. That, and the newer lyrics in the updated version.

There was a seven-second-long ad-lib of "You Got It (The Right Stuff)" by New Kids on the Block on The Real Thing-era live performances, including the Live at the Brixton Academy version.

== Music video ==
The music video produced for "We Care a Lot", directed by Bob Biggs and Jay Brown, was the first video produced for a Faith No More song and received moderate airplay on MTV.

== Appearances ==
"We Care a Lot"

Single by Faith No More

from the album Live at the Brixton Academy
- Released: 1991
- Recorded: April 28, 1990
- Venue: Brixton Academy (London)
- Genre: Funk metal; rap metal
- Length: 3:50
- Songwriters: Chuck Mosley; Roddy Bottum; Billy Gould

As well as the appearing on the albums We Care a Lot, Introduce Yourself and Live at the Brixton Academy the song has appeared on every compilation and video album released by the band and has three different cover versions on the tribute to Faith No More compilation album Tribute of the Year.

== Members ==
- Chuck Mosley – vocals
- Roddy Bottum – keyboards
- Billy Gould – bass
- Jim Martin – guitar
- Mike Bordin – drums

== Critical reception ==
AllMusic's reviewer laments the song's lack of future front-man Mike Patton, calling Mosley's vocals "brute thuggishness" and "flat", but also says that the song is a "fully realized effort in itself". "We Care a Lot" was also listed in PopMatters' 65 Great Protest Songs, citing it as Faith No More's anti-protest song and as a "smirking account of everything that pop and political culture shoved down our throats at the height of the Reagan revolution".

== Track listing ==
From Introduce Yourself
No.	Title	Length
1.	"We Care a Lot"	4:02
2.	"Spirit"	3:50
3.	"Chinese Arithmetic" (Radio Mix, 12" bonus track)	3:54

From Live at the Brixton Academy
No.	Title	Length
1.	"We Care a Lot" (live at Brixton)	3:50
2.	"We Care a Lot" (Remix)	3:52

== Charts ==
Chart (1988)	Peak position
New Zealand (Recorded Music NZ)	40
UK Singles (OCC)	53

== Cover versions ==
- MC Hammer's 1990 song "Pray" interpolates "We Care a Lot".
- Chuck Mosley recorded the song for his 2009 album Will Rap Over Hard Rock for Food with keyboardist Roddy Bottum. Mosley changed lyrics in the verses, including a nod to his former band's biggest hit "Epic" with the lyric, "We care a lot about the guy who wanted it all but couldn't have it."
- Red Hot Chili Peppers covered a portion of it at a 2014 concert in Brooklyn.
- In 2020, the song was covered by an all-star collaboration featuring Bill Kelliher of Mastodon, Ray Luzier of Korn, Frank Bello of Anthrax, DMC, Richard Patrick of Filter, Jason Rockman and Kevin Jardine of Slaves on Dope, Dennis Lyxzén of Refused, Walter Schreifels of Quicksand, Esoteric of Czarface, Raine Maida of Our Lady Peace, and Ivan Doroschuk of Men Without Hats. The song was created to raise awareness and funds for the Roadie Relief effort.
