= From Out of Nowhere (song) =

- Artwork for European releases

Single by Faith No More

from the album The Real Thing
- B-side: "Cowboy Song"; "The Grade"
- Released: October 30, 1989
- Studio: Studio D (Sausalito, California)
- Genre: Alternative metal; funk metal; pop metal
- Length: 3:22
- Label: Slash; London
- Songwriter: Faith No More
- Producer: Matt Wallace

Faith No More singles chronology
"Anne's Song" (1988)	"From Out of Nowhere" (1989)	"Epic" (1990)

"From Out of Nowhere" is a song by American rock band Faith No More. Released as the first single from their third studio album, The Real Thing (1989), it was the band's first single to feature Mike Patton on vocals. The single was first released in the UK on October 30, 1989, but did not appear on the UK singles chart. It was re-released on April 2, 1990, after the success of "Epic", and peaked at No. 23 on the UK singles chart.

== Music video ==
There are two very different versions of this video. The first version features Mike Patton in camouflage shorts, a black undershirt, and sunglasses. Words come across the screen a few times during the video, and there are a few shots of exteriors at the beginning and end. In the second version, Patton is wearing spandex shorts and a black and blue coat. Billy Gould is using a different bass, and there are many more exterior shots, as well as more words going across the screen. Only a few shots are kept from the first version, being some of the shots of Mike Bordin. This latter version was used on the video releases.

== Track listings ==
UK and European issue

1. "From Out of Nowhere" – 3:23
2. "Cowboy Song" – 5:12
3. "The Grade" – 2:03

Australian issue

1. "From Out of Nowhere" – 3:23
2. "Edge of the World" – 4:10
3. "From Out of Nowhere" (Live at Brixton) – 3:24

UK and European reissue

1. "From Out of Nowhere" (7-inch version†) / "From Out Of Nowhere (Extended Remix††)
2. "Woodpecker from Mars" (live †††)
3. "The Real Thing" (live †††)
4. "Epic" (live †††)

† The 7-inch version was used on the CD, cassette and 7-inch editions of the reissue.
†† The Extended Remix was used on the 12-inch and 12-inch picture disc editions of the reissue.
††† Recorded in Norwich, February 6, 1990. Broadcast by The BBC Radio 1 "Rockshow", March 2, 1990. The profanity is obscured and the songs fade out.

== Personnel ==
Personnel are taken from The Real Thing liner notes.

- Mike Bordin – drums
- Roddy Bottum – keyboards
- Billy Gould – bass
- James Martin – guitars
- Mike Patton – vocals

== Charts ==
Chart (1990)	Peak position
Australia (ARIA)	83
Europe (Eurochart Hot 100)	58
UK Singles (Official Charts)	23

== Release history ==
Region	Version	Date	Format(s)	Label(s)	Ref.
United Kingdom	Original	October 30, 1989	7-inch vinyl; 12-inch vinyl	Slash; London	
United Kingdom	Reissue	April 2, 1990	7-inch vinyl; 12-inch vinyl; CD; cassette	Slash; London	
Australia	Original	December 10, 1990	7-inch vinyl; cassette	Slash; Liberation	
Australia	Original	December 17, 1990	12-inch vinyl	Slash; Liberation	
