= The Real Thing (Faith No More album) =

1989 studio album by Faith No More

- The Real Thing uncropped cover

Studio album by Faith No More
- Released: June 20, 1989
- Recorded: December 1988 – January 1989
- Studios: Studio D, Sausalito, California
- Genres: Alternative metal; funk metal; rap metal
- Length: 54:58 (CD and cassette version); 43:22 (LP version)
- Labels: Slash; Reprise
- Producers: Matt Wallace; Faith No More

Faith No More chronology
Introduce Yourself (1987)	The Real Thing (1989)	Angel Dust (1992)

Alternative cover
- The Real Thing cropped CD cover

Singles from The Real Thing
- 1. "From Out of Nowhere" Released: October 30, 1989 (UK); 2. "Epic" Released: January 29, 1990; 3. "Falling to Pieces" Released: July 2, 1990; 4. "Surprise! You're Dead!" Released: 1990; 5. "Edge of the World" Released: 1991

The Real Thing is the third studio album by American rock band Faith No More, released on June 20, 1989, by Slash and Reprise Records. It is the first album to feature singer Mike Patton, following the dismissal of previous vocalist Chuck Mosley. On this album, Faith No More continued to advance their sound range, combining alternative metal, funk metal, and rap metal.

== Background ==
Faith No More underwent several lineup changes before recording their first album, We Care a Lot, released in 1985 and distributed through San Francisco-based label Mordam Records. On the original vinyl release, the band is credited as "Faith. No More" on the album's liner notes, back cover, and on the record itself. Within a year the band signed up with Slash Records. The debut album's title track "We Care a Lot" was later re-recorded, for their follow-up album Introduce Yourself in 1987, and released as their first single. Membership remained stable until vocalist Chuck Mosley was replaced by Mike Patton in 1988.

=== Production ===
The writing for the majority of the music for The Real Thing took place after the tour for Introduce Yourself. An early version of "The Morning After", with alternate lyrics written and sung by Chuck Mosley, was released under the moniker, "New Improved Song" on March 12th, 1989. The track appeared on the Sounds·Waves 2 EP included with Sounds magazine issue 1574. "Surprise! You're Dead!" was composed by Jim Martin in the 1970s, while he was guitarist for Agents of Misfortune, which also featured Cliff Burton in their line up. The recording of the song took place in December 1988 after Chuck Mosley was fired from the band, and was completed prior to the hiring of Mike Patton, who then wrote all the lyrics for the songs, and recorded them the following month over the music.

Producer Matt Wallace said that Patton wrote the lyrics over a 10 to 12 day period; this is considered an impressive feat considering Patton was only 19–20 years old, and "pulled it out of thin air". The only input from Wallace came during a few days spent at a San Francisco coffee shop, where he advised Patton to incorporate more metaphors to soften some of the darker, heavier lyrical themes. Among the darker lyrics on the album are "The Morning After", "Surprise! You're Dead" and "Underwater Love". In 1995, British music publication Q described all three of these songs as lyrically revolving around murder. "Underwater Love" has upbeat music which contrasts the apparent lyrical matter.

== Touring and support ==
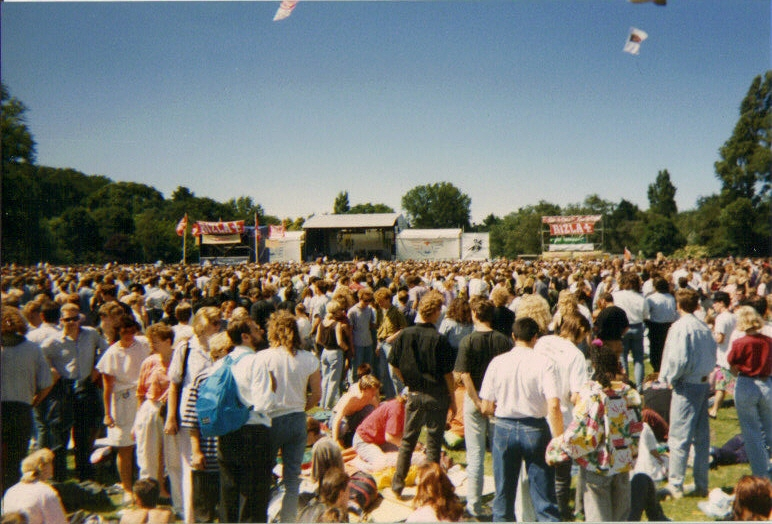
Crowds gathered to a performance of Faith No More at the Parkpop festival, June 24, 1990.

=== Tours ===
The tour in support of The Real Thing was the first Faith No More tour conducted with Mike Patton. The band had begun to be marketed as metal by the media after the album's release, and they were now primarily playing with other bands from the heavy metal genre. Notable artists Faith No More performed with during the touring cycle include Metallica, Billy Idol, Soundgarden, Voivod, Sacred Reich, Forbidden, Primus, Babes in Toyland and Poison. They managed to attract controversy for mocking the party/sex-filled lifestyles of glam metal tourmates such as Poison at several shows in Europe during 1990. At a 1990 Monsters of Rock show in Italy, Patton asked the crowd "which member of Poison can suck his own dick?", and also made fun of Aerosmith, saying to the crowd "out of all the bands today, who do you think does the most drugs? I think it's Aerosmith." Ironically, Faith No More would later cover parts of Aerosmith's song "Walk This Way" on their subsequent Angel Dust tour, and were originally scheduled to go on a European tour with them in 1998, which was cancelled due to Faith No More's split that year.

In 1989, the second show of the tour was filmed for the music video to "From out of Nowhere" in the I-Beam nightclub. During the show, Patton had a beer bottle smashed over his right hand, causing lacerations to some tendons. He regained use of his hand after it healed, but he no longer has feeling in it. The band's August, 28 1990 concert at Burgherrenhalle in Kaiserslautern, Germany is notable for featuring the only ever performance of the song "Faster Disco" with Patton on vocals. The concert also featured several other Chuck Mosley-era songs which have almost never been performed live with Patton, including "Blood", "Greed" and "The Jungle". At that time, the band's first independent album We Care a Lot was not in circulation. "As the Worm Turns" and "Why Do You Bother" were the only songs from the album to be regularly worked into the band's setlists on the tour (aside from the title track, which was re-recorded for their major label debut Introduce Yourself). Regarding the decision to still perform material from We Care a Lot, bassist Billy Gould said to Metal Hammer in May 1990 that, "we'd feel weird cutting that part of ourselves off. We'd be ignoring a root of the tree, if you will."

Touring in support of the album lasted from 1989 to mid-1991. Due to their small catalog at the time, the band eventually grew tired of playing songs from The Real Thing towards the end of the tour. This has been cited as one of the reasons for their change in sound on their next album, Angel Dust.

=== Singles ===
The first single to be released from the album was "From Out of Nowhere" on August 30, 1989, which failed to make the UK Singles Chart. It was re-released on April 2, 1990, and made number twenty-three on the UK Singles Chart. In between these releases was "Epic" on January 30, 1990, the music video for which received extensive airplay on MTV throughout the year, despite provoking anger from animal rights activists for a slow motion shot of a fish flopping out of water. "Falling to Pieces" then saw release on July 2, 1990, and made it to number 92 on the Billboard Hot 100 before the reissue of "Epic", which became the band's first number one hit single, on the ARIA Charts, as well their only top ten single on the Billboard Hot 100, where it reached ninth position.

"Surprise! You're Dead!" had a music video produced for it, directed by Gould, featuring footage shot in Chile during a South American tour in 1991. However, the song never saw release as an official single, and the video was not released until its appearance on Video Croissant. "Edge of the World" saw limited release as a two track promo single in Brazil on CD and 12" vinyl, with the album version as track one and the Brixton Academy live version as the second track, in a yellow slipcase with basic black text.

== Critical reception ==
Professional ratings
Review scores
Source	Rating
AllMusic	4.5/5 stars
Chicago Tribune	2.5/4 stars
The Direktory of Heavy Metal	5/5
Entertainment Weekly	A
Kerrang!	5/5
NME	4/10
Pitchfork	7.6/10
Q	4/5 stars
The Rolling Stone Album Guide	4/5 stars
The Village Voice	B−

Although released in mid-1989, The Real Thing did not enter the Billboard 200 until February 1990, after the release of the second single from the album, "Epic". The album eventually peaked at number eleven on the chart in October 1990, following the reissue of "Epic" almost a year and half after the initial release of the album. It was eventually certified platinum in U.S. and Canada as well as being certified Silver in the United Kingdom.

In July 1989, metal publication The Hard Report described the band as "one of the brightest new stars on the metal/alternative horizon", and said that on The Real Thing "Mike Patton is the new vocal presence, and seizes the moment with precision rap and a raging soul that claims its rightful place in the power mix." They added that the band "draw from reggae, rap and metal circles and melt the sound into a rhythmic state that practically incites an anthem riot." In 1990, Jonathan Gold of the Los Angeles Times described Faith No More as the "kings of neo-metal" and "where hip and headbanging meets". Chris Morris of Billboard magazine described The Real Thing as having a predominant "funk-metal groove" in 1992, while Travis Lowell of Toxic Universe said in 2001 that it contained "funk, metal, traditional rock, instrumental, and even a little 'easy listening'".

Tom Breihan wrote for Stereogum in 2012 that the album "gets a ton of credit and blame for helping to popularize rap-metal, but it was a lot more than that." Following the 2015 remastered re-release of the album, several sources retrospectively reviewed it; Brandon Geist for Rolling Stone wrote that it was then "considered to be an alterna-metal classic", and Joseph Schafer for Stereogum ranked it as the second best Faith No More album, commenting that it was "more cohesive [and] lovable" than Angel Dust. They called it "sublime funk metal" and wrote that "the amount of diversity Faith No More crammed into 1989's The Real Thing seemed to be a middle finger to arena rock". Stuart Berman for Pitchfork wrote that it had a "reputation as an alt-rock trailblazer" and "connection to a long-past funk-metal zeitgeist" continuing to state that the album track "Epic" "was perfectly timed to satiate the then-burgeoning appetite for rap-rock".

Chris Conaton for PopMatters wrote in 2015 that the album "made a minor splash in the alternative metal community" and featured "a fascinating and entertaining smorgasbord of styles", Ian Gittins wrote in his book The Periodic Table of Heavy Rock that the band had the "standard hard-rock assault weapons" when Patton replaced Mosley, but "accessorized them with wildly eclectic influences from hip hop to synth pop and a brutally sarcastic sense of black humour":

== Legacy ==
The album was highly praised by The Dillinger Escape Plan frontman Greg Puciato as well as most members of Korn, including Jonathan Davis, Brian "Head" Welch and James "Munky" Shaffer.

"Epic" was ranked number thirty on VH1's 40 Greatest Metal Songs, and number sixty-seven on their 100 Greatest One-hit Wonders list. In 1990, "Surprise! You're Dead!" appeared in the horror-comedy Gremlins 2: The New Batch, which was released by Warner Bros. Pictures (then part of the same conglomerate as the band's record company Warner Music Group). In 2001, "Falling to Pieces" was also used in the war film Black Hawk Down.

== Awards ==
The Real Thing was nominated for a Grammy Award for Best Metal Performance category in 1989 and "Epic" was nominated for a Grammy Award for Best Hard Rock Performance in 1991.

== Accolades ==
Accolades for The Real Thing
Year	Publication	Country	Accolade	Rank	Ref.
1989	Kerrang!	United Kingdom	"Albums of the Year"	1	
1989	Sounds	United Kingdom	"Albums of the Year"	20	
1989	Village Voice	United States	"Albums of the Year"	27	
1998	Kerrang!	United Kingdom	"Albums You Must Hear Before You Die"	50	
2001	Classic Rock	United Kingdom	"100 Greatest Rock Albums Ever"	64	
2005	Rolling Stone	Germany	"The 500 Greatest Albums of All Time"	105	
2005	Robert Dimery	United States	1001 Albums You Must Hear Before You Die	*	
2006	Classic Rock & Metal Hammer	United Kingdom	"The 200 Greatest Albums of the 80s"	*	

== Track listing ==
All tracks are written by Faith No More (Mike Bordin, Roddy Bottum, Billy Gould, Jim Martin, and Mike Patton).

No.	Title	Length
1.	"From Out of Nowhere"	3:22
2.	"Epic"	4:53
3.	"Falling to Pieces"	5:15
4.	"Surprise! You're Dead!"	2:27
5.	"Zombie Eaters"	5:58
6.	"The Real Thing"	8:13
7.	"Underwater Love"	3:51
8.	"The Morning After"	3:43
9.	"Woodpecker from Mars" (instrumental)	5:40
Total length:		43:22

Bonus tracks
No.	Title	Writer(s)	Length
10.	"War Pigs" (Black Sabbath cover, non-vinyl track)	Geezer Butler, Tony Iommi, Ozzy Osbourne, Bill Ward	7:45
11.	"Edge of the World" (appears as track 6 on cassette editions, non-vinyl track)		4:10
Total length:			54:58

2015 deluxe edition (disc 2)
No.	Title	Writer(s)	Length
1.	"Sweet Emotion"		4:53
2.	"Epic" (Radio Remix Edit)		4:00
3.	"Falling to Pieces" (Video Version) (erroneously listed as "Matt Wallace Remix", which is a different mix)		4:31
4.	"Cowboy Song" ("From Out of Nowhere" B-side)		5:14
5.	"The Grade" ("From Out of Nowhere" B-side)		2:05
6.	"From Out of Nowhere" (Extended Mix)		4:17
7.	"War Pigs" (Live in Berlin 1989)	Butler, Iommi, Osbourne, Ward	7:59
8.	"Surprise! You're Dead!" (Live in Sheffield, Octagon Centre 1990)		2:52
9.	"Chinese Arithmetic" (Live in Sheffield, Octagon Centre 1990)	Bordin, Bottum, Gould, Martin, Chuck Mosley	4:16
10.	"Underwater Love" (Live at Brixton Academy 1990)		3:33
11.	"As the Worm Turns" (Live at Brixton Academy 1990)	Bordin, Bottum, Gould, Martin, Mosley	2:45

== Personnel ==
Personnel taken from The Real Thing liner notes, except where noted.

Faith No More

- Mike Bordin – drums
- Roddy Bottum – keyboards
- Billy Gould – bass, E-mu Emax on "Epic"
- James Martin – guitars
- Mike Patton – vocals

Additional personnel

- Matt Wallace – producer, engineer
- Faith No More – producers
- Jim "Watts" Vereecke – engineer, assistant engineer
- Craig Doubet – assistant engineer
- John Golden – mastering
- Lendon Flanagon – photography
- Jeff Price – artwork
- Terry Robertson – CD design

== Charts ==
=== Weekly charts ===
Weekly chart performance for The Real Thing
Chart (1989–1990)	Peak position
Australian Albums (ARIA)	2
Canada Top Albums/CDs (RPM)	10
Dutch Albums (Album Top 100)	56
German Albums (Offizielle Top 100)	37
New Zealand Albums (RMNZ)	3
Swedish Albums (Sverigetopplistan)	38
UK Albums (Official Charts)	30
US Billboard 200	11

=== Year end charts ===
Year-end chart performance for The Real Thing
Chart (1990)	Position
Australian Albums (ARIA)	37
New Zealand Albums (RMNZ)	19
US Billboard 200	41

== Certifications ==
Certifications for The Real Thing
Region	Certification	Certified units/sales
Australia (ARIA)	Platinum	70,000^{^}
United Kingdom (BPI)	Silver	60,000^{^}
United States (RIAA)	Platinum	1,000,000^{^}
^{^} Shipments figures based on certification alone.
