= Jim Martin (musician) =

American guitarist (born 1961)

- Born: James Blanco Martin; July 21, 1961 (age 65); Hayward, California, U.S.
- Genres: Alternative metal; funk metal; heavy metal; thrash metal
- Occupation: Musician
- Instrument: Guitar
- Years active: 1979–2002; 2011; 2013; 2014
- Formerly of: Vicious Hatred; Spastik Children; Faith No More; Fang; Infectious Grooves

James Blanco Martin (born July 21, 1961) is an American guitarist who played with the rock band Faith No More from 1984 until late 1993 having played on their first four albums: We Care a Lot, Introduce Yourself, The Real Thing, and Angel Dust.

== Career ==
In the early 1980s, Martin played guitar in the thrash metal band Vicious Hatred.

=== Faith No More ===
Martin joined Faith No More in 1984, five years after the group's formation. He played on the albums We Care a Lot, Introduce Yourself, their breakthrough record The Real Thing, and Angel Dust.

Following the release of Angel Dust, Martin left the group for reasons that remain unknown. On his now-defunct website, Martin stated that The Real Thing was Faith No More's ideal album, both in the creative process and the subsequent touring. The musical about-face that the band took with Angel Dust, including the change in focus from guitars to vocals, did not sit well with him. The extent to which Martin did or did not contribute to songwriting and recording on Angel Dust is a subject that the band for years never directly addressed, except to recognize his major influence on the track "Jizzlobber".

In an October 2016 PopMatters interview, Faith No More bassist, Billy Gould, addressed the controversy head-on about whether studio musicians or Martin played on Angel Dust:

"No studio musicians. He played, but the writing process was extremely difficult because he wasn't really much of a fan of the music. He wasn't really behind it. He wasn't really into it. So it was a tough process. I mean, I think, really, we realised that he wasn't going to continue while we were making that record because he was just on a different musical page."

Martin said in an interview, "My publicized 'not being into' Angel Dust was all about the way the whole process went down. There was a lot of weird pressure to follow up The Real Thing, and as a consequence, the album Angel Dust was more contrived musically than I thought was necessary."

Faith No More fired Martin by fax on November 30, 1993, after the band had not progressed as they would have liked in rehearsals and songwriting. As an indication of the gulf that had formed between Martin and the rest of the group, they had recorded and released "Another Body Murdered" (with Boo-Yaa T.R.I.B.E., for the Judgment Night soundtrack) without his participation. Similarly, Martin produced and recorded material for the film Bill & Ted's Bogus Journey without the participation of other members of Faith No More. Producer Matt Wallace later mentioned in The Real Story (a biographical book about Faith No More) that the death of Martin's father was a factor in the guitarist's departure.

On February 18, 2009, Blabbermouth announced that Martin would not be participating in the rumored Faith No More reunion tour. On February 23, Mike Patton confirmed that the band would be reuniting for a string of European tour dates. Two days later, Gould identified the lineup for the tour, which excluded Martin.

=== Other projects ===
Martin's only solo album to date is entitled Milk and Blood (1997), on which he covers his former band's song "Surprise! You're Dead", from The Real Thing.

Martin toured as lead guitarist with the punk band Fang between 1998 and 2000.

In 2011, Martin joined Metallica onstage with Gary Rossington, Pepper Keenan, and Jerry Cantrell to play "Tuesday's Gone" as part of the band's thirtieth-anniversary shows. In 2013, he played guitar for the Infectious Grooves reunion at the Orion Music + More festival at Belle Isle in Detroit, Michigan.

=== Film appearance ===
In 1991, Martin appeared in Bill & Ted's Bogus Journey as "Sir James Martin, head of the Faith No More Spiritual and Theological Center" in the future. Martin's only lines in the film are "Station!" and "What a shithead".

== Discography ==
=== As a band member ===
- Faith No More – We Care a Lot (1985)
- Faith No More – Introduce Yourself (1987)
- Faith No More – The Real Thing (1989)
- Faith No More – Angel Dust (1992)
- Voodoocult – Voodoocult (1995)
- The Behemoth – The Behemoth (1996)
- Jim Martin – Milk and Blood (1997)
- Anand Bhatt and Jim Martin – Conflict (1999)
- Fang – Fish and Vegetables (2000)
- Anand Bhatt, Jim Martin, and Dave Campbell – Fire Woman: A Tribute to The Cult (2001) "Lil Devil"
- Anand Bhatt and Jim Martin – Vivid Casting Call – Digital Remixes (2007)

=== As a featured musician ===
- Die Krupps – The Final Remixes (1994) "Crossfire (Remixed by Jim Martin)"
- Metallica – Garage Inc. (1998) "Tuesday's Gone"
- Primus – Antipop (1999) "Eclectic Electric"
- Skitzo – Got Sick? (1999) "Loner"
- Flybanger – Headtrip to Nowhere (2001) "Cavalry", "When Are You (Gonna Die)?"
- Echobrain – Echobrain (2002) "Spoonfed"
