= Sol Invictus Tour =

2015 concert tour by Faith No More

- Tour by Faith No More
- Associated album: Sol Invictus
- Start date: April 15, 2015
- End date: October 25, 2015
- Legs: 3
- No. of shows: 59

Faith No More concert chronology
- The Second Coming Tour (2009–10); Sol Invictus Tour (2015)

Sol Invictus Tour was the eighth and final concert tour by American rock band, Faith No More in support of their reunion album Sol Invictus. It began on April 15, 2015 in Vancouver, British Columbia and ended on October 25 of the same year in Sacramento, California. With guitarist Trey Spruance rejoining in 2026, this was Faith No More's last major tour with Jon Hudson.

== Set list ==
1. "Motherfucker"
2. "Be Aggressive"
3. "Evidence"
4. "Caffeine"
5. "Epic"
6. "Everything's Ruined"
7. "Black Friday"
8. "Cone of Shame"
9. "Midlife Crisis"
10. "The Gentle Art of Making Enemies"
11. "Easy" (Commodores cover)
12. "Separation Anxiety"
13. "King for a Day"
14. "Ashes to Ashes"
15. "Superhero"

Encore:

1. "Matador"
2. "Just a Man"
3. "We Care a Lot"

== Tour dates ==
Date	City	Country	Venue
North America
April 15, 2015	Vancouver	Canada	PNE Forum
April 16, 2015	Seattle	United States	Paramount Theater
April 17, 2015	Portland	United States	Keller Auditorium
April 19, 2015	San Francisco	United States	Warfield
April 20, 2015	San Francisco	United States	Warfield
April 23, 2015	Los Angeles	United States	The Wiltern
April 24, 2015	Los Angeles	United States	The Wiltern
April 25, 2015	Santa Ana	United States	The Observatory
May 7, 2015	Chicago	United States	Concord Music Hall
May 8, 2015	Detroit	United States	The Fillmore
May 9, 2015	Toronto	Canada	Sony Centre for the Performing Arts
May 11, 2015	Boston	United States	Orpheum Theatre
May 13, 2015	New York City	United States	Webster Hall
May 14, 2015	New York City	United States	Webster Hall
May 15, 2015	Philadelphia	United States	Electric Factory
Europe
May 29, 2015	Nürburgring	Germany	Grune Holle Festival
May 31, 2015	Munich	Germany	Rockavaria Festival
June 2, 2015	Assago	Italy	Sonisphere Festival
June 4, 2015	Vienna	Austria	Rock In Vienna
June 5, 2015	Hradec Králové	Czech Republic	Rock For People Festival
June 6, 2015	Berlin	Germany	Citadel Music Festival
June 8, 2015	Kraków	Poland	Tauron Arena
June 10, 2015	Bratislava	Slovakia	Aegon Arena
June 12, 2015	Landgraaf	Netherlands	Pinkpop Festival
June 13, 2015	Donington	England	Download Festival
June 14, 2015	Glasgow	Scotland	O2 Academy Glasgow
June 17, 2015	London	England	Roundhouse
June 18, 2015	London	England	Roundhouse
June 20, 2015	Clisson	France	Hellfest
June 21, 2015	Dessel	Belgium	Graspop Metal Meeting
June 23, 2015	Hamburg	Germany	Alsterdorfer Sporthalle
June 24, 2015	Berlin	Germany	Schwuz
June 25, 2015	Werchter	Belgium	Rock Werchter
June 26, 2015	Norrköping	Sweden	Bråvalla Festival
June 27, 2015	Seinäjoki	Finland	Provinssirock
June 28, 2015	Odense	Denmark	Tinderbox Festival
North America
July 26, 2015	Austin	United States	Austin Music Hall
July 27, 2015	Dallas	United States	South Side Ballroom
July 28, 2015	Houston	United States	Bayou Music Center
July 30, 2015	Atlanta	United States	Masquerade Music Park
July 31, 2015	Raleigh	United States	Red Hat Amphitheater
August 1, 2015	Philadelphia	United States	Mann Music Center
August 2, 2015	Columbia	United States	Merriweather Post Pavilion
August 4, 2015	Boston	United States	Leader Bank Pavilion
August 5, 2015	New York City	United States	Theater at Madison Square Garden
August 7, 2015	Toronto	Canada	Ricoh Coliseum
August 8, 2015	Montreal	Canada	Heavy MTL
September 3, 2015	West Hollywood	United States	Troubador
September 6, 2015	Seattle	United States	Bumbershoot
September 8, 2015	Morrison	United States	Red Rocks Amphitheatre
September 11, 2015	Chicago	United States	Riot Fest
Latin America
September 15, 2015	Alajuela	Costa Rica	Parque Viva
September 18, 2015	Bogotá	Colombia	Teatro Royal Center
September 20, 2015	Buenos Aires	Argentina	Estadio Luna Park
September 24, 2015	São Paulo	Brazil	Espaço das Américas
September 24, 2015	Rio de Janeiro	Brazil	Rock In Rio
September 27, 2015	Santiago	Chile	Santiago Gets Louder
North America
October 25, 2015	Sacramento	United States	Aftershock Festival
