= Sol Invictus (album) =

2015 studio album by Faith No More

Studio album by Faith No More
- Released: May 19, 2015
- Recorded: 2014
- Studios: Estudios Koolarrow, Vulcan Studios in Oakland, California
- Genres: Alternative metal; experimental rock
- Length: 39:30
- Labels: Reclamation!; Ipecac
- Producer: Billy Gould

Faith No More chronology
| Album of the Year (1997) | Sol Invictus (2015) |

Singles from Sol Invictus
- 1. "Motherfucker" Released: November 28, 2014; 2. "Superhero" Released: March 23, 2015; 3. "Sunny Side Up" Released: 2015; 4. "Cone of Shame" Released: 2016

Sol Invictus (Latin for 'Unconquered Sun') is the seventh studio album by American rock band Faith No More, released on May 19, 2015. It was Faith No More's first studio album since Album of the Year in 1997, marking the longest gap between two studio albums in their career, and their first release on Reclamation! Records. Sol Invictus was also the band's first album since Angel Dust (1992) to feature the same lineup as its predecessor, although it turned out to be their last album with guitarist Jon Hudson.

The album marked the group's fifth collaboration with longtime producer Matt Wallace. This time, Wallace helped with the final mix rather than a more substantial producing role.

== Background ==
On February 24, 2009 after months of speculation and rumors, Faith No More announced they would be reforming with a line-up identical to the Album of the Year era, embarking on a reunion tour called The Second Coming Tour. To coincide with the band's reunion tour, Rhino released the sixth Faith No More compilation, The Very Best Definitive Ultimate Greatest Hits Collection (a double album that includes their hit singles and b-sides and rarities) in the UK on June 8. Faith No More then played in major European festivals including, Download Festival in the UK in June, Hurricane and Southside festivals in Germany, Greenfield Festival in Switzerland, Hove Festival in Norway and Roskilde Festival in Denmark, among other dates. The tour continued into 2010 with appearances at the Soundwave Festival in Australian cities throughout February and March. During their tour, the band added new full length covers to their repertoire, including "Ben" by Michael Jackson, "Chariots of Fire" by Vangelis and "Switch" by Siouxsie and the Banshees. During the Soundwave shows, in Australia, and a run of shows in New Zealand, they covered the 1986 song "Don't Dream It's Over", by Australia/New Zealand band Crowded House. Faith No More had previously covered snippets of it in 1990, while on tour for The Real Thing. On the 2009–2010 reunion tour, songs that Faith No More covered snippets of include "Boom Boom Pow" by the Black Eyed Peas, "Delilah" by Tom Jones, "Fuck You" by Lily Allen, "Poker Face" by Lady Gaga and "Popcorn" by Hot Butter. They also covered a Serbian folk song called "Ajde Jano" and Tony Montana's theme from the film Scarface.

After an eleven-month hiatus, Faith No More played four shows in South America in November 2011. On the first date (November 8, 2011), the band played a "mystery song" – later confirmed as "Matador" – which led to speculation of new material. They continued touring in 2012, and played at Sonisphere France on July 7, 2012. During the 2011 and 2012 shows, they began covering parts of "Feels So Good" by Chuck Mangione, "Et moi, et moi, et moi" by Jacques Dutronc, "Niggas in Paris" by Jay Z/Kanye West and "Never Gonna Give You Up" by Rick Astley. They also covered the internet meme song "Trololo", which was originally by Eduard Khil in 1976.

In a January 2013 interview, Mike Patton suggested that the band would not remain active beyond the reunion tour, stating that "it's sort of petered out" and the band was "maybe a little too conscious for [their] own good." In July 2013, Billy Gould hinted the band may record new material in the future, saying "We will do something again only when all members are with the focus on that, and ready for the challenge. This is not the time... yet." On July 4, 2014, Faith No More played their first show in two years at Hyde Park in London, supporting Black Sabbath. At that show, Faith No More debuted two new songs "Motherfucker" and "Superhero" (also known by fans as "Leader of Men"). On September 2, Bill Gould revealed to Rolling Stone that Faith No More had begun work on a new album. On February 10, 2015 the band announced the title of their new album, Sol Invictus, and that it was set to be released on May 19, 2015.

== Touring ==
Following the announcement of the album, Faith No More played a one-off show at San Francisco's Amoeba Records, where they performed "Motherfucker" and "Superhero", along with "As the Worm Turns" from We Care a Lot, "Spirit" from Introduce Yourself and "Ashes to Ashes" from Album of the Year. This was their first show in the United States since 2010. They then had a two-show run in Tokyo, Japan in February 2015, before flying to Australia for the 2015 edition of the Soundwave Festival. The festival's lineup featured Hollywood Undead, Incubus, Marilyn Manson, Ministry, New Found Glory, Slipknot, Soundgarden and Steel Panther, among others. It lasted from February 21 to February 28, and would turn out to be the last edition held.

From April 2015 to mid-May 2015, the band embarked on a tour of North America, during which Faith No More were supported by the bands Flattbush, Ho99o9, Le Butcherettes, Philm and Urinals. The band subsequently went on a tour of Europe from late May to June, then returning to the United States for another run of shows between July and September. For the remainder of September, the band toured Latin America, a region which they had neglected during the Album of the Year Tour in 1997–98. During the Latin American run of shows, they played their first concert in Costa Rica, where they were supported by local band The Movement In Codes. Touring for Sol Invictus was finished by the end of 2015, with the band's final performance that year occurring at the Aftershock Festival in Sacramento, California on October 25. Artists that Faith No More shared bills with during the Sol Invictus tour include Babymetal, Dir En Grey, Emmure, Gojira, Limp Bizkit, Meshuggah, Metallica and Three Days Grace.

All 10 songs from Sol Invictus were performed live during the tour. The least performed song was "Rise of the Fall", which was only played on 4 occasions. For the tour, Faith No More covered parts of "All About That Bass" by Meghan Trainor, "All My Life" by the Foo Fighters, "End of the Road" by Boyz II Men, "Rich Girl" by Hall & Oates, "Lido Shuffle" and "Lowdown" by Boz Scaggs, "Strawberry Letter 23" by The Brothers Johnson, "Surfin' Bird" by the Trashmen, "The Lion Sleeps Tonight" by The Tokens and "The Power of Love" by Jennifer Rush.

Faith No More briefly reconvened in August 2016 for two shows with Chuck Mosley in San Francisco and West Hollywood, to celebrate the reissue of their 1985 debut We Care a Lot. To date, these remain the band's most recent performances, in addition to being their final shows with Mosley, who died from substance abuse in November 2017. The final song played at the second of these shows was "Anne's Song" from Introduce Yourself. During these shows, Mosley had a separate acoustic set, where he performed songs from his post-Faith No More bands Cement and Chuck Mosley and VUA. The solo set also included acoustic versions of "Death March" and "Faster Disco", from Introduce Yourself, as well as an acoustic version of King for a Day... Fool for a Lifetime's "Take This Bottle", which deals with alcoholism. While Patton has performed several Mosley tracks live, the setlists for the main shows where Mosley was singing with the rest of the band only included songs from their two albums together. Mosley's solo acoustic version of "Take This Bottle" remains the only Patton era track he is known to have sung.

== Promotion ==
"Motherfucker" was the first single to be released from Sol Invictus. It was released on November 28, 2014 exclusively on 7" vinyl to coincide with Record Store Day's Black Friday. It was later released digitally on December 5, 2014. The "Superhero" single was initially scheduled to be released on March 17, 2015 on 7" vinyl, but was delayed to March 23 after the pressing plants suffered from adverse weather effects. A free preview of the song was made available March 1, 2015 through several media outlets, including Marvel.com, YouTube via Ipecac Recordings, and on BBC Radio 1's Rock Show. "Superhero" was also able to be purchased from iTunes later that day. BBC Radio 6 Music confirmed that "Sunny Side Up" will be the next single.

Music videos were made for "Sunny Side Up" and "Separation Anxiety" during 2015. The "Sunny Side Up" video, directed by Joe Lynch, is set in a nursing home, while "Separation Anxiety" uses footage from the 1955 horror film Dementia. On September 19, 2016, Faith No More released a preview for a music video for "Cone of Shame" that was written & directed by Goce Cvetanovski.

== Music and lyrics ==
Musically, the album continues the band's tradition of experimenting in various genres, including post-punk, heavy metal, black metal, blues rock, country, hip hop, ska, western music and even dirges. In an interview from before the album's release, Gould said, "it’ll be much different than everything else out there – but that’s sort of the point. It's a combination of what we don’t hear in the outside world and what we feel is lacking from other bands. And in the end, it will sound like Faith No More." Kevin Cogill of The Antiquiet compared the album's more aggressive sounds to Helmet's 1997 album Aftertaste. "Black Friday" lyrically references the tradition of black friday shopping in the United States. The song features mostly clean electric or acoustic segments, but then sporadically drops in distorted guitars and screaming from Patton. It has been described as incorporating elements of both country/western music and heavy metal, and as "[shifting] effortlessly between the two styles for three minutes." The closing track "From the Dead" has also been described as having elements of country/western music, and as being a "plangent alt-country anthem". It is musically reminiscent of the track "Take This Bottle" from King for a Day... Fool for a Lifetime, which was another earnest country and western ballad. The band themselves described the single "Cone of Shame" as being "blues-based rock and roll" that also draws from Link Wray, The Cramps and black metal.

Slant Magazine claimed that on Sol Invictus, Faith No More avoided "the more dated parts" of their late 1980s/early 1990s sound, like "slap bass and rap". However, the band still experimented with rapping on the lead single "Motherfucker". It is considered a rap rock song, like with the band's most well-known track "Epic", yet it has also been described as being more of a "lighthearted" piece. The song takes a long time to build, incorporating militaristic ambient sounds at the beginning. Louder Sound said that when the song properly begins, it is similar to the comedy rap rock band the Bloodhound Gang, who Faith No More had once shared a bill with in 1997. Rick Giordano of the Riverfront Times also believed that "Motherfucker" was reminiscent of the Bloodhound Gang. Billy Black of Crack Magazine compared "Motherfucker" to Patton's other band Tomahawk, who formed during the time when Faith No More were split.

== Reception ==
Professional ratings
Aggregate scores
| Source | Rating |
|---|---|
| Metacritic | 79/100 |
Review scores
| Source | Rating |
| AllMusic | 4/5 stars |
| The A.V. Club | B+ |
| Consequence of Sound | B |
| NME | 8/10 |
| Paste | 8.3/10 |
| Pitchfork | 6.0/10 |
| Record Collector | 4/5 stars |
| Rolling Stone | 3.5/5 stars |
| The Skinny | 5/5 stars |
| The Sydney Morning Herald | 4/5 stars |

Sol Invictus sold over 200,000 copies in its first two months of release according to the United World Charts. According to the review aggregator Metacritic, Sol Invictus received "generally favorable reviews" based on a weighted average score of 79 out of 100 from 25 critic scores. In their May 2015 review, Drowned in Sound commented, "as ever, Patton remains FNM’s big draw and the singer is in typically extraordinary form", adding "it's hard to believe there was a time when Anthony Kiedis could accuse this gentleman of ripping off his own laboured vocal style." Kevin Fitzpatrick of Scene Point Blank gave it an 8.1 out of 10 on May 11, 2015. He noted the long gap between releases from the band, saying "June, 1997. Hanson's 'MMMBop' was at the top of the charts. Hype was building for James Cameron's soon-to-be-released new film Titanic. Layne Staley and Princess Diana had yet to shuffle off this mortal coil. And Faith No More's Album of the Year hit the shelves." Fitzpatrick added that, "for whatever the reason, whatever the astrological alignment, Faith No More have unexpectedly come together once more to give us Sol Invictus — a slow-burning slab of the truly unexpected. [Even] after so many years, the band remains as seemingly unpredictable and uncompromising as they ever were." David James Young of Australian website MusicFeeds also noted the long gap between releases. On May 13, 2015 he wrote "there’s someone born in 1997 that’s legally drinking as we speak", adding that, "how does one go about approaching an analysis of such a release? Is it to be considered a separate entity to the rest of the band’s discography given the proximity?". Rhian Daly of British publication NME awarded it a 7 out of 10, saying that "with their first album in 18 years, the San Fran band have managed a rare trick — Sol Invictus sounds like they’ve never been away."

NPR's Adrien Begrand wrote on May 10, 2015 that, "what makes Sol Invictus, Faith No More's first album in 18 years, so extraordinary is not only how comfortably it fits into the band's discography, but also how economical it is. So many veteran bands overcompensate on record, but Sol Invictus clocks in at a sharp 39 minutes. It's lean and to the point, taking listeners deep into Faith No More's twisted world." The AV Club gave it a B+ rating and observed that "the creepy 'Separation Anxiety' [wouldn’t] sound out of place on the band's pinnacle, Angel Dust." Andrew Drever of The Sydney Morning Herald gave it four out of five stars, and described the album as "musically focused and concise, striking on a moody palette of darker atmospheres." He noted that there was less of a contrast between the heaviest songs and the lightest songs, like on with previous releases, but still praised the musical diversity found in tracks such as "Sunny Side Up", "From the Dead" and "Motherfucker".

=== Legacy and accolades ===
The album was included at number 5 on Rock Sound's top 50 releases of 2015 list. Rolling Stone ranked it second on their list of the 20 best metal albums of 2015.

In June 2015, the album won a Metal Hammer Golden God Award for Best Album.

== Track listing ==
All songs are credited to Faith No More in the album’s liner notes. Actual songwriters adapted from ASCAP.

| No. | Title | Writer(s) | Length |
|---|---|---|---|
| 1. | "Sol Invictus" | Billy Gould, Mike Patton | 2:36 |
| 2. | "Superhero" | Gould, Mike Bordin, Patton | 5:16 |
| 3. | "Sunny Side Up" | Gould, Patton | 3:00 |
| 4. | "Separation Anxiety" | Gould, Bordin, Patton | 3:43 |
| 5. | "Cone of Shame" | Gould, Patton | 4:40 |
| 6. | "Rise of the Fall" | Gould, Patton | 4:09 |
| 7. | "Black Friday" | Gould, Bordin, Patton | 3:19 |
| 8. | "Motherfucker" | Roddy Bottum, Patton | 3:33 |
| 9. | "Matador" | Gould, Patton | 6:09 |
| 10. | "From the Dead" | Gould, Patton | 3:06 |
| Total length: | | | 39:30 |

Japanese edition bonus track
| No. | Title | Writer(s) | Length |
|---|---|---|---|
| 11. | "Superhero Battaglia" (Alexander Hacke remix) | Gould, Bordin, Patton | 5:19 |
| Total length: | | | 44:49 |

== Personnel ==
Faith No More

- Mike Bordin – drums
- Roddy Bottum – piano
- Billy Gould – bass
- Jon Hudson – guitar
- Mike Patton – vocals

Technical personnel

- Billy Gould – production, engineering, mixing
- Mike Patton – vocal recording
- Matt Wallace – mixing
- Maor Appelbaum – mastering
- Martin Kvamme – album design
- Dustin Rabin – band photos
- Ossian Brown – cover and booklet photos

== Charts ==
=== Weekly charts ===
| Chart (2015) | Peak position |
|---|---|
| Australian Albums (ARIA) | 2 |
| Austrian Albums (Ö3 Austria) | 7 |
| Belgian Albums (Ultratop Flanders) | 4 |
| Belgian Albums (Ultratop Wallonia) | 12 |
| Canadian Albums (Billboard) | 9 |
| Czech Albums (ČNS IFPI) | 2 |
| Danish Albums (Hitlisten) | 6 |
| Dutch Albums (Album Top 100) | 7 |
| French Albums (SNEP) | 12 |
| Finnish Albums (Suomen virallinen lista) | 1 |
| German Albums (Offizielle Top 100) | 4 |
| Hungarian Albums (MAHASZ) | 4 |
| Irish Albums (IRMA) | 10 |
| Italian Albums (FIMI) | 20 |
| New Zealand Albums (RMNZ) | 6 |
| Norwegian Albums (VG-lista) | 2 |
| Portuguese Albums (AFP) | 6 |
| Scottish Albums (Official Charts) | 5 |
| Spanish Albums (Promusicae) | 23 |
| Swedish Albums (Sverigetopplistan) | 27 |
| Swiss Albums (Schweizer Hitparade) | 3 |
| UK Albums (Official Charts) | 6 |
| UK Rock & Metal Albums (Official Charts) | 1 |
| US Billboard 200 | 15 |
| US Top Rock Albums (Billboard) | 2 |

=== Year-end charts ===
| Chart (2015) | Position |
|---|---|
| Australian Albums (ARIA) | 80 |
| Belgian Albums (Ultratop Flanders) | 91 |
| Belgian Albums (Ultratop Wallonia) | 179 |
