= The Second Coming Tour (Faith No More) =

2009–10 concert tour by Faith No More

- Tour by Faith No More
- Associated album: The Very Best Definitive Ultimate Greatest Hits Collection
- Start date: June 10, 2009
- End date: March 1, 2010
- Legs: 5
- No. of shows: 34 in Europe; 1 in Asia; 8 in South America; 3 in North America; 10 in Australasia; 56 Total

Faith No More concert chronology
- Album of the Year Tour (1997–98); The Second Coming Tour (2009–10); Sol Invictus Tour (2015)

The Second Coming Tour is the seventh concert tour by American rock band, Faith No More. The tour supported their sixth greatest hits album, The Very Best Definitive Ultimate Greatest Hits Collection (2009). The tour primarily visited Europe with additional shows in Asia, Australasia and the Americas. Beginning in June 2009, the tour played over fifty shows, with a majority being an appearance at a music festival. It marks the band's first tour after over a decade hiatus.

== Background ==
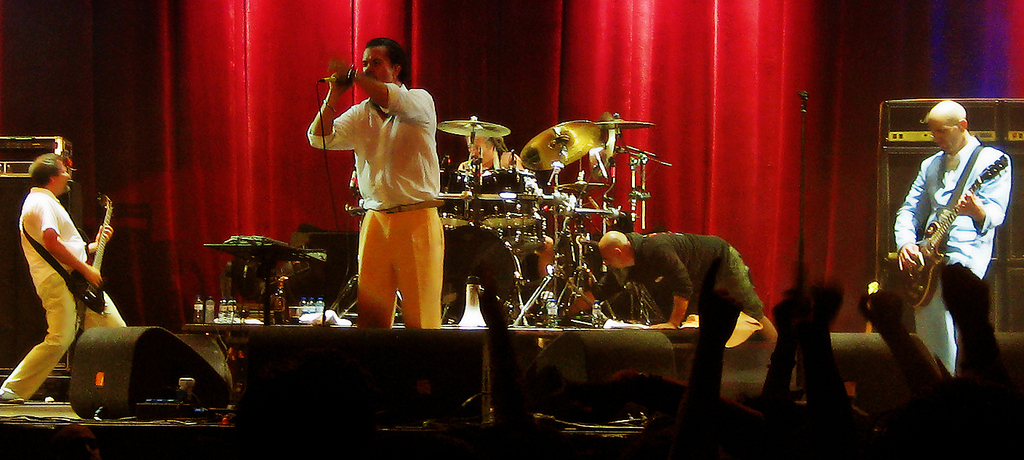
Faith No More performing at Sudoeste

The band garnered media attention, when talks of a tour in the United Kingdom began to circulate in November 2008. These rumors were later dismissed by bassist Billy Gould. He stated:

"If anything like this were to happen, it would have to come from the band, and I haven't spoken with any of them in over a year. So as far as I know, there isn't anything to talk about, and I'm pretty sure that if you were to contact Patton, he would tell you the same thing."

On February 24, 2009, the band announced they were reforming with the same lineup during their 1997 album era. This announcement was following by a statement from the band's publicity hinted at a European tour. A month later, it was revealed the band was the headlining act for the Download Festival. News of other festival appearances later followed. The band posted pictures on their social media for their rehearsals for the tour. With more shows in Europe revealed, many fans wondered about shows in North America. Gould mentioned the thought of touring the US was "not out of the question" but chances were slim, as there was heavy demand elsewhere.

The tour officially ended in March 2010. However, the band continued to tour throughout the year and into 2012 with several one-off concerts and festival shows in the United States and Europe.

== Opening acts ==
- Eagles of Death Metal (Australasia, select dates)
- Selfish Cunt (London)
- Farmers Market (Berlin)
- Zu (Berlin)
- Harmful (Frankfurt)
- CMX (Helsinki)
- Waltari (Helsinki)
- Kid606 (Riga)
- Kurban (Istanbul)
- Firewater (Prague)
- Adebisi Shank (Dublin)
- Emergency Blanket (Lima)
- Lerdo (Santiago, October 29)
- Sepultura (Santiago, October 30)
- Fiskales Ad-Hok (Santiago, October 30)
- Pato Machete (Monterrey, Mexico City)
- Clondementto (Zapopan)
- Neil Hamburger (Melbourne)

== Tour dates ==
Date	City	Country	Venue
Europe
June 10, 2009	London	England	O_{2} Academy Brixton
June 12, 2009^{[A]}	Leicestershire	England	Donington Park
June 13, 2009^{[B]}	Interlaken	Switzerland	Flugplatz Interlaken
June 14, 2009^{[C]}	Milan	Italy	PalaSharp
June 16, 2009	Berlin	Germany	Kindl-Bühne Wuhlheide
June 19, 2009^{[D]}	Nickelsdorf	Austria	Pannonia Fields II
June 20, 2009^{[E]}	Scheeßel	Germany	Eichenring
June 21, 2009^{[F]}	Neuhausen ob Eck	Germany	Neuhausen ob Eck Airfield
June 22, 2009	Frankfurt	Germany	Jahrhunderthalle
June 24, 2009	Helsinki	Finland	Kaisaniemi Park
June 25, 2009^{[G]}	Arendal	Norway	Friluftsområdet Hove
June 27, 2009^{[H]}	Borlänge	Sweden	Borlänge Festival Grounds
June 29, 2009	Moscow	Russia	Б1 Maximum
June 30, 2009	Saint Petersburg	Russia	Yubileyny Sports Palace
July 1, 2009	Riga	Latvia	Sapņu Fabrika
July 3, 2009^{[I]}	Roskilde	Denmark	Festivalpladsen
July 4, 2009^{[J]}	Gdynia	Poland	Gdynia-Kosakowo Airport
July 5, 2009^{[K]}	Turku	Finland	Ruissalon Kansanpuisto
August 8, 2009^{[L]}	Zambujeira do Mar	Portugal	Herdade da Casa Branca
August 10, 2009	Athens	Greece	Theatro Vrahon
August 12, 2009	Istanbul	Turkey	Küçükçiftlik Park
August 14, 2009^{[M]}	Burgas	Bulgaria	Central Beach
August 15, 2009	Bucharest	Romania	Sala Polivalentă
August 16, 2009^{[N]}	Budapest	Hungary	Óbudai-sziget
August 17, 2009	Prague	Czech Republic	Tesla Arena
August 20, 2009^{[O]}	Kiewit	Belgium	Festivalweide
August 21, 2009^{[P]}	Netherlands	Biddinghuizen	Spijk en Bremerberg
August 22, 2009^{[Q]}	Hohenfelden	Germany	Stausee Hohenfelden
August 23, 2009^{[R]}	Lüdinghausen	Germany	Verkehrslandeplatz Borkenberge
August 25, 2009^{[S]}	Edinburgh	Scotland	Edinburgh Corn Exchange
August 27, 2009	Dublin	Ireland	Olympia Theatre
August 28, 2009^{[T]}	Reading	England	Little John's Farm
August 29, 2009^{[U]}	Paris	France	Parc de Saint-Cloud
August 30, 2009^{[V]}	Bramham	England	Bramham Park
Asia
September 1, 2009	Tel Aviv	Israel	Israel Trade Fairs and Convention Center
South America
October 27, 2009	Lima	Peru	Hipódromo de Monterrico
October 29, 2009	Santiago	Chile	Teatro Caupolicán
October 30, 2009	Santiago	Chile	Estadio Bicentenario de La Florida
November 1, 2009^{[W]}	Buenos Aires	Argentina	Club Ciudad de Buenos Aires
November 3, 2009	Porto Alegre	Brazil	Pepsi on Stage
November 5, 2009	Rio de Janeiro	Brazil	Citibank Hall
November 7, 2009^{[X]}	São Paulo	Brazil	Chácara do Jockey
November 8, 2009	Belo Horizonte	Brazil	Arena Chevrolet Hall
North America
November 11, 2009	Monterrey	Mexico	Arena Monterrey
November 13, 2009	Mexico City	Mexico	Jose Cuervo Salon
November 14, 2009	Zapopan	Mexico	Auditorio Telmex
Australasia
February 16, 2010	Christchurch	New Zealand	Westpac Arena
February 18, 2010	Auckland	New Zealand	Vector Arena
February 20, 2010^{[Y]}	Brisbane	Australia	RNA Showgrounds
February 21, 2010^{[Y]}	Sydney	Australia	Eastern Creek International Raceway
February 22, 2010	Sydney	Australia	Hordern Pavilion
February 24, 2010	Melbourne	Australia	Festival Hall
February 25, 2010	Melbourne	Australia	Festival Hall
February 26, 2010^{[Y]}	Melbourne	Australia	Royal Melbourne Showgrounds
February 27, 2010^{[Y]}	Adelaide	Australia	Bonython Park
March 1, 2010^{[Y]}	Perth	Australia	Steel Blue Oval
United States
April 12, 2010	San Francisco	United States	The Warfield
April 13, 2010	San Francisco	United States	The Warfield
April 14, 2010	San Francisco	United States	The Warfield
April 17, 2010	Indio, California	United States	Coachella Music and Arts Festival
United States - Leg Two
July 2, 2010	Brooklyn	United States	Williamsburg Waterfront
July 3, 2010	Philadelphia	United States	Mann Center for the Performing Arts
July 5, 2010	Brooklyn, New York	United States	Williamsburg Waterfront
Europe - Leg Three
July 8, 2010	Lisbon	Portugal	Optimus Alive! Festival
July 9, 2010	Madrid	Spain	Sonisphere Festival
July 10, 2010	Bilbao	Spain	BBK Live Festival
July 11, 2010	Novi Sad	Serbia	Exit Festival
July 13, 2010	Athens	Greece	Ejekt Festival
July 15, 2010	Dour	Belgium	Dour Festival
July 16, 2010	Bern	Switzerland	Gurtenfestival
July 17, 2010	Wiesen	Austria	Forestglade Festival
July 18, 2010	Joensuu	Finland	Ilosaarirock Festival
United States - Leg Three
November 30, 2010	Los Angeles	United States	Hollywood Palladium
December 1, 2010	Los Angeles	United States	Hollywood Palladium
South America - Leg Two
December 4, 2010	Santiago	Chile	Teletón Chile
December 5, 2010	Santiago	Chile	Estadio Bicentenario de La Florida
South America - Leg Three
November 8, 2011	Buenos Aires	Argentina	Malvinas Argentinas
November 9, 2011	Montevideo	Uruguay	Teatro de Verano Ramón Collazo
November 12, 2011	Santiago	Chile	Maquinaria Festival
November 14, 2011	Paulínia	Brazil	SWU Festival
Europe - Leg Four
June 28, 2012	Sopron	Hungary	Volt Festival
June 29, 2012	Belgrade	Serbia	Belgrade Calling Festival
June 30, 2012	Perm	Russia	Creation of Peace Festival
July 2, 2012	Moscow	Russia	Stadium Live
July 4, 2012	Poznań	Poland	Malta Festival
July 5, 2012	Hradec Králové	Czech Republic	Rock for People
July 7, 2012	Amnéville	France	Sonisphere Festival
July 8, 2012	London	United Kingdom	Hammersmith Apollo
July 10, 2012	London	United Kingdom	O_{2} Academy Brixton

Festivals and other miscellaneous performances

^{A} This concert was a part of the "Download Festival"
^{B} This concert was a part of the "Greenfield Festival"
^{C} This concert was a part of "Rock in Idro"
^{D} This concert was a part of the "Nova Rock Festival"
^{E} This concert was a part of the "Hurricane Festival"
^{F} This concert was a part of the "Southside Festival"
^{G} This concert was a part of the "Hove Festival"
^{H} This concert was a part of "Peace & Love"
^{I} This concert was a part of the "Roskilde Festival"
^{J} This concert was a part of the "Open'er Festival"
^{K} This concert was a part of "Ruisrock"
^{L} This concert was a part of "Sudoeste"
^{M} This concert was a part of the "Spirit of Burgas"
^{N} This concert was a part of the "Sziget Festival"
^{O} This concert was a part of "Pukkelpop"
^{P} This concert was a part of "Lowlands"
^{Q} This concert was a part of the "Highfield-Festival"
^{R} This concert was a part of "Area4"
^{S} This concert was a part of "The Edge Festival"
^{T} This concert was a part of the "Reading Festival"
^{U} This concert was a part of "Rock en Seine"
^{V} This concert was a part of the "Leeds Festival"
^{W} This concert was a part of the "Pepsi Music Festival"
^{X} This concert was a part of the "Maquinaria Festival"
^{Y} This concert was a part of "Soundwave"

Cancellations and rescheduled shows

November 13, 2009	Mexico City, Mexico	José Cuervo Salon	Moved to the Pabellón Oeste
February 16, 2010	Wellington, New Zealand	TSB Bank Arena	Moved to the Westpac Arena in Christchurch, New Zealand

=== Box office score data ===
Venue	City	Tickets sold / available	Gross revenue
Westpac Arena	Christchurch	3,717 / 4,332 (86%)	$242,832
Hordern Pavilion	Sydney	5,435 / 5,435 (100%)	$456,632
