= Seize the Time (Flattbush album) =

Studio album by Flattbush
- Released: September 9, 2006
- Recorded: 2006
- Genre: Metal
- Length: 36:10
- Label: Koolarrow Records
- Producer: Billy Gould

Flattbush chronology
Smash The Octopus (2003)	Seize the Time (2006)

Professional ratings
Review scores
Source	Rating
Allmusic	3/5 stars

Seize the Time, released in 2006 (see 2006 in music), was the second studio album by US rock band Flattbush.

== Track listing ==
1. "Serve the People" (Flattbush)
2. "Multiple Deportation" (Flattbush)
3. "Lupa" (Flattbush)
4. "Seize the Time" (Flattbush)
5. "All Power to the People" (Flattbush)
6. "Welga" (Flattbush)
7. "Community Organizer" (Flattbush)
8. "Prison and Beyond" (Flattbush)
9. "The Passion of Satan" (Flattbush)
10. "Hamlet" (Flattbush)
11. "Fascist Diktador" (Flattbush)
12. "AK-47 for Self Defense" (Flattbush)
13. "Bakit" (Flattbush)
14. "Red Light District II" (Flattbush)
15. "Awit Ng Pag-Asa/The Messiah" (Abad, Gould)

== Credits ==
- Joe Luevano – drums
- Arman Maniago – bass guitar
- Bradley Walther – guitar
- Enriko Maniago – vocals
