= Smash the Octopus =

Smash The Octopus

Studio album by Flattbush
- Released: September 11, 2003
- Recorded: April 2003
- Genre: Metal
- Length: 43:04
- Label: Koolarrow Records
- Producer: Mark Pistel, Billy Gould

Flattbush chronology
Kontra 'Tado (2001)	Smash The Octopus (2003)	Seize The Time (2006)

Professional ratings
Review scores
Source	Rating
Allmusic	link

Smash The Octopus, released in 2003 (see 2003 in music), was the first studio album by US rock band Flattbush.

== Track listing ==
1. "Smash The Octopus" (Ramon B. Enriko M. Arman M. Eric L.)
2. "Better Off Dead" (Enriko M. Eric L.Ramon B. Arman M.)
3. "Kontra'Tado" (Enriko M. Eric L. Ramon B. Arman M.)
4. "Question Authority" (Enriko M. Eric L. Ramon B. Arman M.)
5. "Foxhole" (Eric L. Ramon B. Enriko M. Arman M.)
6. "Napalm" (Enriko M. Eric L. Ramon B. Arman M.)
7. "Batas Militar [Salvage Style]" (Ramon B. Enriko M. Arman M. Eric L.)
8. "Expose And Oppose" (Ramon B. Enriko M. Arman M. Eric L.)
9. "GMA is a US-SOB" (Ramon B. Enriko M. Arman M. Bradley W. Eric L.)
10. "Death Squad" (Ramon B. Enriko M. Arman M. Eric L.)
11. "PIGS" (Ramon B. Enriko M. Arman M. Bradley W. Eric L.)
12. "LIC Total War [Low Intensity Conflict]" (Eric L. Ramon B. Enriko M. Arman M.)
13. "Red Light District" (Arman M.)
- Guitars Written By Eric Long, Except #9 & #11 By Bradley Walther and Eric Long

== Credits ==
- Ramon Banda - drums
- Arman Maniago - bass guitar
- Bradley Walther - guitar
- Enriko Maniago - vocals
