= Last Cup of Sorrow =

Single by Faith No More

from the album Album of the Year
- Released: August 5, 1997
- Genre: Alternative metal
- Length: 4:12
- Label: Slash
- Songwriters: Billy Gould; Mike Patton
- Producers: Roli Mosimann; Billy Gould

Faith No More singles chronology
"Ashes to Ashes" (1997)	"Last Cup of Sorrow" (1997)	"Stripsearch" (1997)

"Last Cup of Sorrow" is the third track from Faith No More's sixth studio album Album of the Year. It was released as a single on August 5, 1997. It placed No. 14 on Mainstream Rock Tracks, No.62 on Australia Top 50, and No. 51 on UK Top 100. The artwork is in a similar style to the original poster art for Vertigo.

== Meaning ==
When asked about the song, Billy Gould replied:

Mike can do a lot of wild things with his voice, for one. But, yeah, he sang through an old Telefunken tube mic, and we compressed the living shit out of it.

== Music video ==
The idea for the music video originated from director Joseph Kahn, and is based on Alfred Hitchcock's Vertigo, a film dealing with acrophobia, which the band were fans of. In a June 28, 1997 issue of Billboard, Kahn said "I always thought Vertigo had an interesting music-video feel to it because of the rich graphics in the film." Kahn was chosen from a list of directors who had submitted ideas to the band. In a July 6, 1997 interview on MTV's 120 Minutes program, bassist Billy Gould said that Kahn's ideas for the video were similar to ideas that they had.

Shooting occurred during mid-1997 in San Francisco, California. It features the lead singer, Mike Patton dressed in the same outfit as James Stewart's character, trailing a blonde played by film actress Jennifer Jason Leigh, respectively dressed the same as Vertigo's female lead Madeleine. The band didn't know Jennifer Jason Leigh, and she appeared in the video since they heard she wanted to be in it, with the band meeting her for the first time during the day of the shoot. Kahn said in the June 1997 Billboard interview that "the idea of Mike Patton playing Jimmy Stewart seemed funny to me. Basically you're taking this really subversive person and putting him in this clean, sterile, technicolor '50s world, yet pieces of the subversiveness of his persona keep coming through this world. It's like blending an old film with this totally weird '90s type of guy." Many scenes are also recreated from the Vertigo, such as the opening rooftop sequence, Madeleine's plunge into San Francisco bay, Mike moving up and down a stepladder, the belltower sequence complete with the famous Hitchcock Zoom and the psychedelic dream sequence.

The emphasis is mainly on parody, key moments including drummer Mike Bordin sweeping Mike Patton's head in the dream sequence with a broom (presumedly a reference to Vertigo's scene where Midge is describing to Scottie that music can clear the cobwebs out of your head like a broom), bassist Billy Gould cross-dressing, Leigh's character being a black wigged sado-masochist, and Leigh fainting when she sees a shadowy figure in the tower, which ends up being drummer Mike Bordin, who at the end of the video casually starts eating a bagel.

== Remixes ==
A remix of the song by German band Rammstein appeared on some editions for Album of the Year. The remix was primarily done by Rammstein's guitarist Richard Kruspe. Rammstein were labelmates of Faith No More at Slash Records, and a Faith No More remix of the Rammstein song "Du riechst so gut" was released the following year. Rammstein later sampled their "Last Cup of Sorrow" remix on "Nebel", the closing track of their 2001 album Mutter. In 1997, "Last Cup of Sorrow" also had other remixes released, including a remix titled the "Bonehead Remix" and a remix from Album of the Year co-producer Roli Mosimann.

== Reception ==
NME said in June 1997 that the song had "robo-vocals" and "funk-spikiness". CMJ called it one of Album of the Year's "best pop songs" in July 1997.

The liner notes for the 2003 compilation This Is It: The Best of Faith No More stated that the song took on "poetic grandeur" following the band's 1998 split.

Consequence of Sound ranked it as the second-greatest Faith No More song in 2015, behind only "Midlife Crisis". In his review for the 2016 deluxe edition of Album of the Year, MXDWN's Sean Hall called the song a "roller coaster ride", remarking, "a bell section that sounds surprisingly like wind chimes functions as a lifesaver to which the listener clings to get themselves through the aggressive guitars, dark bass and creepy vocals, which sound as if they are coming through a radio from The Twilight Zone."

== Track listings ==
"Blue Vertigo" cover

1. "Last Cup of Sorrow" (7" Edit) – 3:15
2. "Pristina (Billy Gould Mix)" – 4:18
3. "Last Cup of Sorrow (Roli Mosimann Mix)" – 6:26
4. "Ashes to Ashes (Dillinja Mix)" – 5:30

"Orange Vertigo" cover

1. "Last Cup of Sorrow" – 4:12
2. "Last Cup of Sorrow (Bonehead Mix)" – 4:54
3. "She Loves Me Not (Spinna Main Mix)" – 4:41
4. "She Loves Me Not (Spinna Crazy Mix)" – 4:41

Japanese track listing

1. "Last Cup of Sorrow" (7" Edit) – 3:15
2. "Pristina (Billy Gould Mix)" – 4:18
3. "Last Cup of Sorrow (Roli Mosimann Mix)" – 6:26
4. "Ashes to Ashes (Dillinja Mix)" – 5:30
5. "Last Cup of Sorrow (Bonehead Mix)" – 4:54
6. "She Loves Me Not (Spinna Main Mix)" – 4:41
7. "She Loves Me Not (Spinna Crazy Mix)" – 4:41

== Charts ==
Chart (1997)	Peak position
Australia (ARIA)	66
New Zealand (Recorded Music NZ)	32
UK Singles (OCC)	51
US Mainstream Rock (Billboard)	14
