= Motherfucker (Faith No More song) =

2014 single by Faith No More

Single by Faith No More

from the album Sol Invictus
- B-side: "Motherfucker" (J. G. Thirlwell remix)
- Released: November 28, 2014
- Recorded: 2014
- Genre: Rap rock; funk rock; alternative metal
- Length: 3:33
- Label: Ipecac
- Songwriter: Faith No More
- Producer: Billy Gould

Faith No More singles chronology
| "I Started a Joke" (1998) | "Motherfucker" (2014) | "Superhero" (2015) |

"Motherfucker" is a song by the American rock band Faith No More. It was released on Record Store Day's Black Friday, November 28, 2014, as the first single from their seventh studio album, Sol Invictus (2015). It was later released digitally on December 9, 2014. It is the band's first release of new studio recorded material since Album of the Year (1997), breaking a 17-year hiatus.

== Background and release ==
"Motherfucker" was first played in concert during July 2014's British Summer Time Hyde Park, along with another new song called "Superhero". Bassist Billy Gould later revealed in an interview to Rolling Stone that the band was on the way to release a new album in April 2015, also stating "Motherfucker" was going to be the first single from it, with a limited print of 5,000 seven-inch copies on Record Store Day. It will also feature a remix by J. G. Thirlwell on the B-side. The cover artwork is made by Cali Dewitt with a photograph by James Gritz. This photograph had coincidentally already been used for another single by a metal band, Rage's single In Vain (I Won't Go Down) in 1998.

On the song, keyboardist Roddy Bottum stated:

It feels apt that the first track we're releasing is "Motherfucker," a song about accountability. Basically we've created, recorded and mixed a new body of work by ourselves and we're releasing it on our own label. It's a huge deal for us to only have ourselves to answer to at this point in our career and the song is about that, where the buck stops via the basic imagery of foie gras production, bondage. . .y'know, stuff like that.

== Reception ==
Christopher R. Weingarten of Rolling Stone wrote that the song "marches forth with the doom-laden raps of their 1989 breakthrough The Real Thing, the triumphant choruses of their 1997 swan-song Album of the Year, the moan-to-screech dynamics of Mike Patton's avant-minded solo career and a merciless snare cadence tip-tapping at the edges of sanity." Gregory Adams of Exclaim! stated the song "takes on properties of the FNM of old, whether it be Mike Patton's The Real Thing rap cadence, or the way the vocalist can easily turn out soaring vocal melodies to gruff and grizzly growls targeting the 'motherfucker' that tricked them in their youth." Adams also further added: "The music is likewise epic, evolving from spacious and sinister piano lines into a grand rock escapade." Ed Keeble of Gigwise described the track as "very rude, very noisy, very political: all the prerequisites that make a Faith No More song awesome." Rick Giordano of the Riverfront Times wrote in December 2014 that, "one of the most creative and influential bands in recent memory with possibly the most versatile, highly admired vocalist in the last few decades releases its first single in almost twenty years... and has the keyboard player do lead vocals on a song that kinda sounds like Bloodhound Gang, and calls it 'Motherfucker'? Good one. I truly suspect this is just a grand trolling by the band before its full-length knocks the music world on its ass in 2015."

== Personnel ==
Faith No More

- Mike Bordin – drums
- Roddy Bottum – piano
- Billy Gould – bass
- Jon Hudson – guitar
- Mike Patton – vocals

Technical personnel

- Billy Gould – production, engineering, mixing
- Mike Patton – vocal recording
- Matt Wallace – mixing
- Maor Appelbaum – mastering

== Charts ==
| Chart (2014) | Peak position |
|---|---|
| Finland Download (Latauslista) | 14 |
| US Billboard Rock Digital Songs | 46 |
