= Ashes to Ashes (Faith No More song) =

Single by Faith No More

from the album Album of the Year
- B-side: "The Big Kahuna"; "Mouth to Mouth"; "Light Up and Let Go"; "Collision"
- Released: May 19, 1997
- Genre: Alternative metal; alternative rock
- Length: 3:37
- Label: Slash
- Songwriters: Mike Bordin; Roddy Bottum; Billy Gould; Jon Hudson; Mike Patton
- Producers: Roli Mosimann; Billy Gould

Faith No More singles chronology
"Evidence" (1995)	"Ashes to Ashes" (1997)	"Last Cup of Sorrow" (1997)

Music video
- "Ashes to Ashes" on YouTube

"Ashes to Ashes" is the seventh track on Faith No More's sixth studio album Album of the Year. It was the album's first single and was released on May 19, 1997. It was reissued on January 8, 1998.

== Background and music ==
When asked about the song, Billy Gould replied:

The bulk of that song was written the first week. We arranged it here, and then we sent Patton a tape. He was in Italy, but he came up with the lyrics and the singing right away. It was one of those songs that just clicked -- one of those songs that we do most naturally. That's our sound.

— Billy Gould

== Music video ==
The music video for "Ashes to Ashes" was shot in Los Angeles during 1997, with British director Tim Royes. It was the second video made for Album of the Year, after "Last Cup of Sorrow", even though "Ashes to Ashes" was the first single released. The video featured the band playing in a supernatural house. The house was also used for scenes in the movie Seven.

== Release ==
In 1997, an electronic remix titled the "Automatic 5 Dub" mix was featured on a Reprise Records compilation titled Some of our Best Friends... Are Hungry, which also featured songs from other Warner Music artists including Arkarna, Drill Team, Kara's Flowers, Primal Scream and Tanya Donelly. The "Automatic 5 Dub" mix and several other remixes for "Ashes to Ashes" were included on certain international editions of Album of the Year, in addition to appearing on some editions of the single itself.

== Reception ==
In his June 1997 review for Album of the Year, Joshua Sindell of Phoenix New Times characterized the song as being a "Soundgarden stomp flirting with a New Romantic-like, arms-outstretched melody."

The Guardian ranked it as the tenth best Faith No More song in 2014. They wrote, "Album of the Year sounded unfinished and is barely listenable. But one track, 'Ashes to Ashes', stood out. It is a moody rocker, with a memorably anthemic chorus that soared thanks to one of the finest vocal performances of Patton's career." When Consequence of Sound ranked all 126 Faith No More songs in 2015, they placed "Ashes to Ashes" at number ten. They characterized the song as having "growling guitar distortion" and "soaring choral arrangements." A July 1997 live version of the track from the "Stripsearch" single was also included in this list, and it was ranked towards the bottom. Louder Sound listed it as the eighth best Faith No More song in 2018. The order of their list was chosen by English funk metal band The Final Clause of Tacitus.

Australian radio station Triple J ranked it 31st on their annual "Hottest 100" list for the year of 1997.

== Covers ==
In 2021, the electronic duo Last Survivor released a synthwave cover of the song. The following year, American progressive rock band Anova Skyway released a cover of the song on their EP Reset.

== Track listings ==
=== Original ===
"Gold on Maroon" cover

1. "Ashes to Ashes"
2. "The Big Kahuna"
3. "Mouth to Mouth"
4. "Ashes to Ashes (Hardknox Alternative Mix)"

"Maroon on Gold" cover

1. "Ashes to Ashes (Radio Edit)"
2. "Light Up and Let Go"
3. "Collision"
4. "Ashes To Ashes (Automatic 5 Dub^{[A]})"

=== Reissue ===
"Gold on Black" cover

1. "Ashes to Ashes (Edit)"
2. "Ashes to Ashes (Dillinja Remix)"
3. "The Gentle Art of Making Enemies"
4. "Ashes to Ashes" (Live^{[B]})

"Black on Gold" cover

1. "Ashes to Ashes"
2. "Last Cup of Sorrow (Rammstein Mix)"
3. "Last Cup of Sorrow (Sharam VS FNM Club Mix)"
4. "The Gentle Art of Making Enemies" (Live)

== Charts ==
Chart (1997)	Peak position
Australia (ARIA)	8
European Hot 100 Singles (Music & Media)	60
Finland (Suomen virallinen lista)	7
Germany (GfK)	76
Ireland (IRMA)	26
New Zealand (Recorded Music NZ)	39
Norway (VG-lista)	14
Switzerland (Schweizer Hitparade)	50
UK Singles (Official Charts)	15
UK Rock & Metal (Official Charts)	1
US Mainstream Rock (Billboard)	23

== Certifications ==
Region	Certification	Certified units/sales
Australia (ARIA)	Gold	35,000^{^}
New Zealand (RMNZ)	Gold	15,000^{‡}
^{^} Shipments figures based on certification alone.^{‡} Sales+streaming figures based on certification alone.

== Footnotes ==
1. While only one of DJ Icey & Maestro's "Ashes to Ashes" remixes appear on the UK single set, two remixes were recorded and released:
  1. The version on the UK "Maroon on Gold" single (850 905-2) as well as Album of the Year bonus disc. This remix is titled "Ashes To Ashes (Automatic 5 Dub)" and DJ Icey and Maestro are given credits in the liner notes.
  2. A completely different remix which appears on the European and Australian pressing (London Records - 850 911-2) and on the promotional UK (London Records - Ashes-1) and French (Barclay 3594) pressings. This remix is titled "Ashes To Ashes (Icey and Mystro Mix)".
2. Live at the Phoenix Festival '97 on July 27, 1997.
