= Slavic Soul Party! =

American Balkan brass/jazz band

Slavic Soul Party
- Origin: New York City
- Genres: Jazz, world music, brass band
- Years active: 1999 – present
- Members: Kenny Bentley; John Carlson; Adam Dotson; Peter Hess; Matt Moran; Peter Stan; Chris Stromquist; Tim Vaughn; Kenny Warren
- Website: slavicsoulparty.com

Slavic Soul Party (often styled Slavic Soul Party!) is an American Balkan brass/jazz band. The band borrows from Balkan brass, dixieland, New Orleans Second Line, funk, klezmer, and Roma music.

The band has performed on stages usually known for rock bands, opening for such acts as Arcade Fire and Dresden Dolls. They have also performed at music festivals which highlight their international flavors, such as Chicago's 14th annual World Music Festival in 2012.

== Members ==
There have been at least nineteen members of Slavic Soul Party, including:

- Matt Moran, bandleader (drums, percussion)
- Roland Barber (trombone)
- John Carlson (trumpet)
- Ron Caswell (tuba)
- Adam Dotson (trombone)
- Brian Drye (trombone)
- Shane Endsley (trumpet)
- Jacob Garchik (trombone)
- Curtis Hasselbring (trombone)
- Peter Hess (saxophone, clarinet)
- Ben Holmes (trumpet)
- Matt Musselman (trombone)
- Oscar Noriega (saxophone, clarinet)
- Ted Reichman (accordion)
- Chris Speed (clarinet)
- Peter Stan (accordion)
- Chris Stromquist (snare drum)
- Take Toriyama (snare drum)
- Kenny Warren (trumpet)
- Tim Vaughn (trombone)
- Rossen Zahariev (cornet, trumpet)

== Discography ==
- In Makedonija (Knitting Factory, 2002)
- Bigger (Barbes, 2005)
- Teknochek Collision (Barbes, 2007)
- Taketron (Barbes, 2009)
- New York Underground Tapes (Barbes, 2012)
- Plays Duke Ellington's Far East Suite (Ropeadope, 2016)
