= Parque Viva =

Park and entertainment venue in Costa Rica

- Parque Viva
- Interactive map of Parque Viva
- Former names: Parque Viva
- Address: Ruta 27; Alajuela, Costa Rica; Costa Rica
- Location: Calle Rincón Chiquito, Alajuela, Costa Rica
- Owner: Grupo Nacion
- Operator: Grupo Nacion
- Capacity: 16,000 (Imperial Amphitheater); 1,800-9,000 (Centrokölbi)
- Surface: Césped

Construction
- Groundbreaking: 26 August 2014
- Opened: 11 April 2015
- Cost: ¢4.706 millones de colones (aprox. $8.2 millones al tipo de cambio de la época) destinados a la compra de títulos de La Nación
- Project manager: Grupo Nacion

Tenants
- Move concerts and others

Website
- https://parqueviva.com/

Parque Viva is a sporting and entertainment complex located in Alajuela, Costa Rica. The venues opened in 2015 and consist of the 9,000-seat indoor event hall Centrokölbi and the 16,000-seat Imperial Amphitheater.

Parque Viva is the first entertainment center of its kind in Central America. The park, spanning over a total area of 30,000 square meters (approx. 7.41 acres or 3 ha), includes the 16k-seat Imperial Amphitheatre, Circuit Go Rigo Go, and Centro Printea. The park offers 4,000 parking spaces. Parque Viva was built around the defunct race track Autódromo La Guácima. The capacity of the amphitheater is 20,000. The first concert held in the amphitheatre was by the Orquesta Filarmónica de Costa Rica (Costa Rican Philharmonic Orchestra), for its grand opening.

== Concerts ==
The following is a list of concerts, showing date, artist or band, tour, opening acts, attendance and revenue.

Year	Date	Artist(s) (Opening act)	Tour	Attendance	Revenue	Ref.
2015	May 2	Enrique Iglesias (Capital Cities)	Sex and Love Tour	—N/a		
2015	June 20,21,27,28	Blue Man Group	—N/a			
2015	September 15	Faith No More	Sol Invictus Tour	—N/a		
2015	October 18	Katy Perry (Tinashe)	Prismatic World Tour	16,199 / 16,199	$1,423,310	
2015	October 31	Juan Luis Guerra	Todo Tiene Su Hora Tour	—N/a		
2016	May 31	Miguel Bosé	I Love Tour	—N/a		
2016	June 5	Maluma	Pretty Boy, Dirty Boy World Tour	—N/a		
2016	July 17	Maroon 5	Maroon V Tour	18,404 / 18,404	$1,687,040	
2016	September 25	Ha*Ash (María José Castillo)	1F Hecho Realidad Tour	—N/a		
2017	February 25	Magneto + Mercurio	—N/a			
2017	March 25	Fito Páez	—N/a			
2017	May 1	Slayer	Repentless Tour	—N/a		
2017	May 6	Marc Anthony	Marc Anthony Live	—N/a		
2017	June 6	Ed Sheeran (Antonio Lulic)	÷ Tour	17,464 / 17,464	$1,288,350	
2017	June 10	Río Roma	Let's Live It Tour	—N/a		
2017	July 9	Ariana Grande (Échele Miel, Fátima Pinto, Victoria Monét and CNCO)	Dangerous Woman Tour	11,141 / 11,141	$776,744	
2017	September 15	Junior Express	Junior Express:Live	—N/a		
2017	October 15	Fifth Harmony	PSA Tour	1,482 / 3,400	$91,358	
2017	November 16	Franco de Vita	Free Tour	—N/a		
2018	February 22	Andrea Bocelli	Live in Costa Rica	—N/a		
2018	March 15	The Killers	Wonderful Wonderful World Tour	9,849 / 10,287	$876,499	
2018	March 18	CNCO	Más Allá Tour	—N/a		
2018	March 25	Ha*Ash	Gira 100 años contigo	—N/a		
2018	April 11	Natalia Lafourcade	—N/a			
2018	May 5	Alejandro Fernández	Breaking Barriers Tour	—N/a		
2018	May 12	Roberto Carlos	Live in Costa Rica	3,569 / 3,569	$321,118	
2018	May 25	Los Ángeles Azules	From Square To Square	—N/a		
2018	August 17	Cañaveral Group + Sonora Santanera + Eddy Herrera	—N/a			
2018	August 25	Jarabe de Palo	—N/a			
2018	September 22	Steve Aoki + Deorro	Life In Color Tour	—N/a		
2018	December 2	Los Ángeles Azules	From Square To Square	—N/a		
2019	June 29	Pandora + Yuri	—N/a			
2019	August 4	Pepe Aguilar (Río Roma)	Pepe Aguilar Tour 2019	—N/a		
2019	August 20	Hillsong Worship	—N/a			
2019	August 24	Paulo Londra	Home Run Tour	—N/a		
2019	October 8	Bryan Adams	—N/a			
2019	November 10	Jack Johnson	All the Light Above It Too World Tour	4,254 / 5,397	$2,945,690	
2019	December 1	Sebastian Yatra	Yatra Yatra Tour	—N/a		
2019	December 17	Serrat + Sabina	There are not Two without Three Tour	—N/a		
2020	January 25	Reik	—N/a			
2020	February 28	Backstreet Boys	DNA World Tour	—N/a		
2022	March 4	Los Ángeles Azules (Los Plancharanga and Los Ajenos)	—N/a			
2022	March 13	Ska-P	—N/a			
2022	May 1	Alejandro Sanz (José Cañas and Fofo Madrigal)	TheTour	—N/a		
2022	May 7	Kany García	—N/a			
2022	May 28	Joan Manuel Serrat	The Vice Of Singing	—N/a		
2022	June 5	Louis Tomlinson (Sun Room and Pedro Capmany)	Louis Tomlinson World Tour	—N/a		
2022	June 17	Karol G	Bichota Tour	—N/a		
2022	June 18	Alejandro Fernández (Alex Fernández and Eduardo Aguirre)	Hecho en Mexico Tour	—N/a		
2022	December 4	Fonseca (Río Roma)	Traveling Tour	—N/a		
2023	January 20	Steve Aoki	—N/a			
2023	February 3	Ha*Ash	Spin my way out with me Tour	—N/a		
2023	March 11 & 12	Feid	Nitro Jam Tour	—N/a		
2023	April 22	Camilo	From Inside to Outside Tour	—N/a		
2023	May 6	Rock Fest	—N/a			
2023	May 20	Manuel Turizo	2000 Tour	—N/a		
2026	September 10	Tini	Futttura World Tour	—N/a		
2026	October 29	Soy Luna	Soy Luna Tour - El Ultimo Show	—N/a		
