= Kultur Shock =

American gypsy punk band

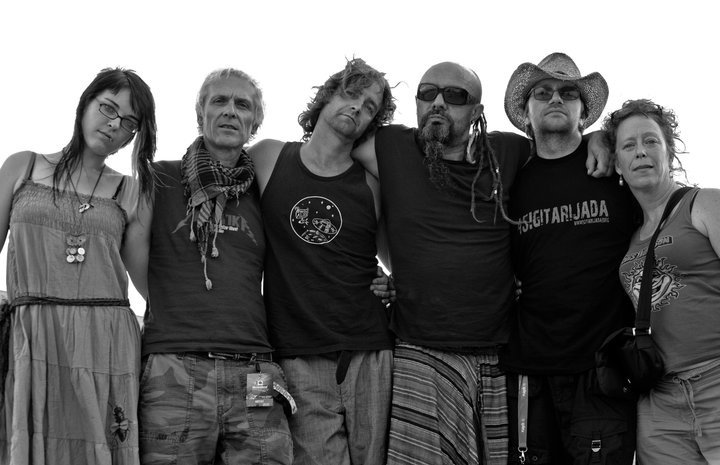
- Kultur Shock 2011

Background information
- Origin: Seattle, Washington, United States
- Genres: folk punk, Gypsy punk, folk metal, alternative metal
- Years active: 1996−present
- Labels: Kultur Shock Records, Koolarrow Records
- Members: Gino Srdjan Yevdjevich; Val Kiossovski; Matty Noble; Chris Stromquist; Guy Michael Davis; Amy Denio
- Past members: Mario Butkovic; Paris Hurley; Masa Kobayashi; Nedim H. Hamzic; Amir Beso Lazy; Borislav Iochev; Brad Houser; Johnny Morovich; Jessica Lurie; Ambrose Nortness
- Website: http://www.kulturshock.com/

Kultur Shock is a Seattle-based folk punk band which specializes in mixing music like rock, metal and punk with traditional Balkan music.

== Biography ==
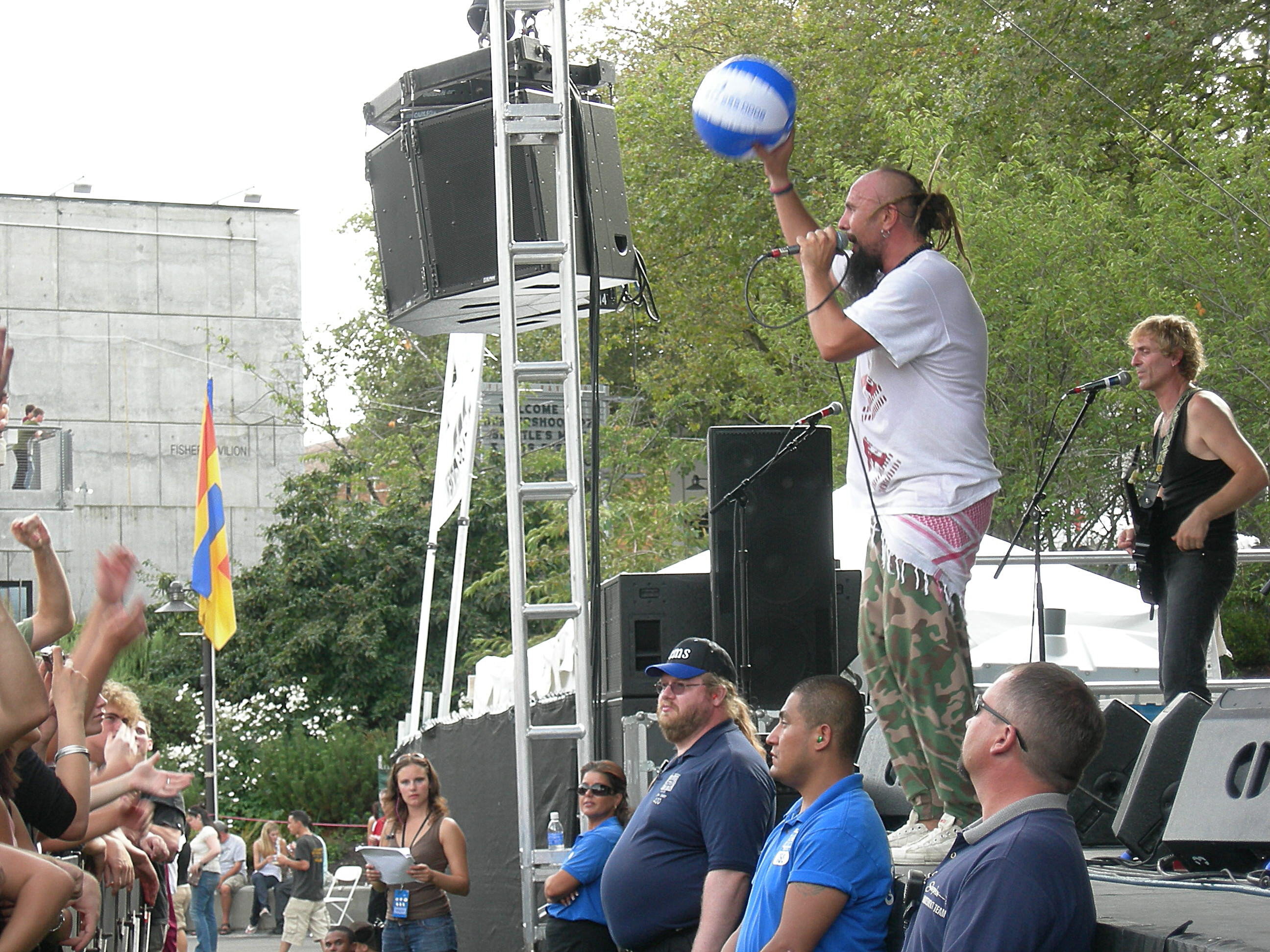
Kultur Shock at Bumbershoot in 2007

Active since 1996, Kultur Shock combines Balkan folk music with punk, metal and art rock. Its members hail from Bosnia, Bulgaria, Indonesia, and the United States. The band has released 9 studio albums and had performed over 1,500 shows throughout the United States and Europe. Kultur Shock was signed to Bill Gould's Koolarrow Records from 2001 to 2006 and released three albums for the label: FUCC the INS, Kultura-Diktatura and We Came to Take Your Jobs Away. In 2006 the band formed its own label Kultur Shock Records and publishing company, Kultur Shock Music.

In 2011, the band attended the Motovun Film Festival along with Pips, Chips & Videoclips and performer Nick Cave.

In 2014, Kultur Shock released IX, their sixth studio album and sixth collaboration with engineer/producer Jack Endino.

The band defines itself as "a live band of blue-collar immigrants".

== Current lineup ==
- Gino Srdjan Yevdjevich (Sarajevo, Bosnia and Herzegovina) – vocals, trumpet, tarabuka
- Val Kiossovski (Sofia, Bulgaria) – guitar, vocal
- Matty Noble (USA) – violin, vocals
- Chris Stromquist (Brooklyn, NY) – drums
- Guy Michael Davis (Jakarta, Indonesia) – bass
- Amy Denio (Detroit, Michigan) – clarinet, saxophone, vocals

=== Chris Stromquist ===
Chris Stromquist (born 5 March 1973) is an American drummer and member of Kultur Shock, the Brooklyn-based Balkan brass band Slavic Soul Party. and the New York avant-garde salsa band Zemog El Gallo Bueno.

== Discography ==
=== Studio albums ===
- FUCC the I.N.S. (2001)
- Kultura-Diktatura (2004)
- We Came to Take Your Jobs Away (2006)
- Integration (2009)
- Ministry of Kultur (2011)
- IX (2014)
- D.R.E.A.M. (2019)
- House of Kultur (2025)
- House of Shock (2026)

=== Live albums ===
- Live in Amerika (1999)
- Live in Europe (2008)
- Live at Home (2015)
- Kultur Shock: Acoustic Live (2023)

=== Extended plays ===
- Tales of Grandpa Guru, Vol. 1 (2012)
- Tales of the Two Gurus, Vol. 2 (2016) (with Edo Maajka)
- Drama EP (2018)
- Resilience EP (2018)
- Evil EP (2019)
