= La Plebe =

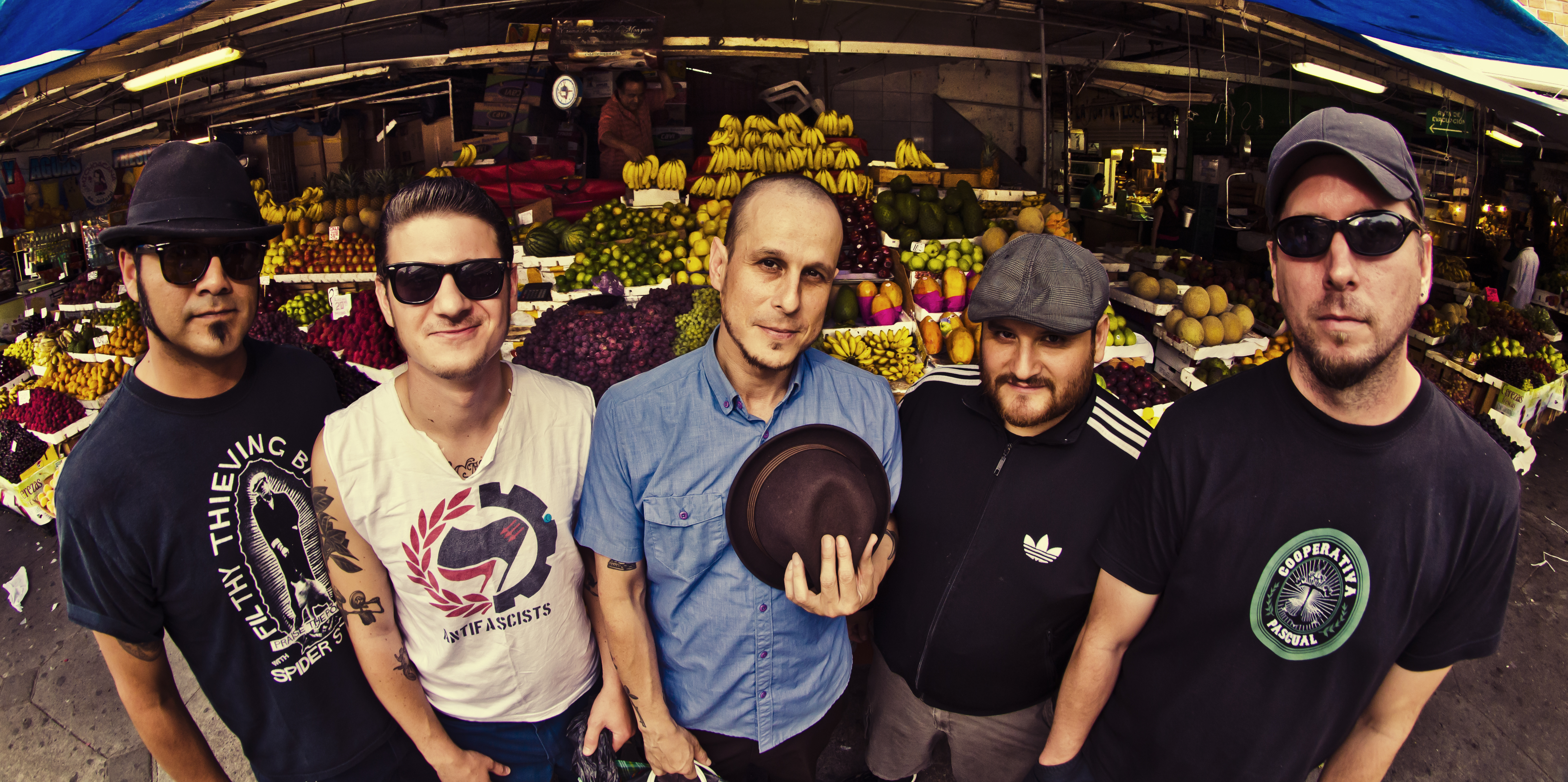

Background information
- Also known as: La Plebe de San Pancho
- Origin: San Francisco, California, United States
- Genre: Punk rock
- Years active: 2001-2016
- Labels: Koolarrow, Red Scare Industries
- Members: Adam Paganini; Guadalupe Bravo; Alberto Cuéllar; Antonio Cuéllar; Mark T. Harris
- Past members: Jose "Augie" Aguilera; Mike Raytis
- Website: http://www.laplebe.com

La Plebe is an American punk rock band from San Francisco, California. Formed in early 2001, the band played over 850 shows and has been a consistent part of various music scenes ever since, marked notably by multiple tours of México, Europe and the Balkans.

== History ==
La Plebe was formed in early 2001 by childhood friends Guadalupe (Lupe) Bravo and José (Augie) Aguilera, who originate from México. The duo was joined by Mike Raytis (percussion), Alberto Cuéllar (trumpet, also from México), and Mark T. Harris (drums) and subsequently started playing shows around the San Francisco Bay Area. Raytis left at the end of 2001. Soon after, Alberto's brother Antonio joined to play valve trombone, thus rounding out the horn section, and solidifying the line-up for the next 2+ years. From early 2002 through mid-2004, La Plebe played 180+ shows throughout California, and into Mexico, playing Tijuana, Ensenada, Tecate, and Mexicali. They also twice ventured further south into central Mexico to play in Mexico City, Guadalajara, along with many other smaller cities.

In 2003 La Plebe released their first recording, Conquista 21, A 6-song EP which included the popular "La Posta" as well as the cover "Vahos Del Ayer", by the late Argentina punk band Flema. In 2004 they release a 4-song EP named Exploited People, produced by Faith No More's Billy Gould.

Augie left the group in September 2004, and Adam (Pags) Paganini, an Argentine, joined La Plebe in October 2004. The band started writing all new material. Their first official show back was in March 2005 at La Peña Cultural Center in Berkeley, California, after which the band got back to playing shows as much as possible, including more tours of central Mexico, multiple ventures into The Balkans (since 2006), along with a couple tours of Western Europe (since 2008). At their first ever show in London in 2008, they were joined on stage by The Clash's Mick Jones to sing the song "Guns Of Brixton". Notably, in their 10-year history, La Plebe has played in 17 (non-U.S.) countries in total, but in only 6 U.S. states.

In July 2005, they released the 8-song EP Entre Cerveza, Ritmo, y Emoción..., again produced by Billy Gould but this time engineered by Jamie McMann. Songs included "Que Barbaridad", "Enfadada", and "Hijo Mio", as well as a cover of the Ewan MacColl song "Dirty Old Town" (known best as done by The Pogues).

2007 saw the release of their first full-length album ¡Hasta La Muerte!. Again produced by Billy Gould and engineered/ mixed by Jamie McMann, the album was released on Red Scare Records in the U.S., and on Gould's own record label Koolarrow Records in Europe. The album contains show favorites "Mi Tierra", "Pinches Fronteras", "Plebe Por Vida", as well as the band's version of the Louis Jordan song "Run Joe".

On July 27, 2010, La Plebe was voted "Best Poder to the People", an editors' award in the San Francisco Bay Guardian's Best of the Bay issue.

The band released their most comprehensive, full-length vinyl LP recording Brazo En Brazo on November 9, 2010, through Koolarrow Records. Due to the success of this release, the band then re-released most of their prior records on vinyl.

In 2013 they released a shaped 7" picture disc on Pirates Press Records entitled Been Drinkin' Again. The record is in the shape of a Mexican lotería card (artwork by Johnny "Peebucks" Bonnel of Swingin' Utters; colorized by Josue Rojas). The record also comes packaged with a full lotería set.

In April 2013, La Plebe collaborated with Bosnian band Dubioza Kolektiv on the song "99%," which appeared on Dubioza's album Apsurdistan. Later that year La Plebe went on their fifth European tour except bassist Lupe Bravo was replaced by Juankar from the band Boikot. Lupe resumed playing bass after the tour was over.

In 2015 La Plebe was asked to record a rendition of Green Day’s Having a Blast for the 20th anniversary of the release of the album Dookie at the same studio that Green Day originally recorded it. La Plebe also performed along with the rest of musicians on the tribute album for a fundraiser for 924 Gilman Street that was held at the Fox Theater in Oakland in 2016. In the middle of the show members Billie Joe Armstrong, Mike Dirnt and Tré Cool of Green Day gathered on stage to have February 19th, 2016 officially declared “Green Day Day” by then Oakland Mayor Libby Schaaf in celebration of their contributions to art and culture in the Bay Area. La Plebe also played with Billie Joe Armstrong's prior band Pinhead Gunpowder at 924 Gilman Street in Berkeley amongst dozens of other shows that La Plebe was known for performing at the 924 Gilman Street in support of it continuing to be a prominent youth and community punk rock venue.

The band played one of their final shows (before an extended hiatus) at Bottom of the Hill in San Francisco on October 15, 2016.

== Musical style ==
La Plebe describes their music as "bilingual punk with horns 'n vomit..." alluding to their early days where members sometimes vomited on stage due to overexertion. Their high energy music is based in early punk rock and hardcore, mostly played fast, with melodic overlays from the trumpet and trombone. They consider themselves a punk band, though often mis-categorized as ska due to the presence of the horns. Song subjects are usually politically or socially motivated, covering topics ranging from class struggle, border issues, immigration, unity, vice, oppression, and more. Pags and Lupe share lead vocal duties. Their lyrics are mostly written and sung in Spanish, with the occasional English tune.

== Current lineup ==
- Guadalupe (Lupe) Bravo — bass and vocals (2001–present)
- Adam (Pags) Paganini — guitar and vocals (2004–present)
- Alberto Cuéllar — trumpet (2001–present)
- Antonio Cuéllar — valve trombone (2001–present)
- Mark T. Harris — drums (2001–present)

=== Past members ===
- Jose "Augie" Aguilera — guitar and vocals (2001–2004)
- Mike Raytis — percussion (2001)

== Discography ==
- Conquista 21 (self-release, 2003)
- Exploited People (self-release, 2004)
- Entre Cerveza, Ritmo, y Emoción... (self-release, 2005 / Re-released on Koolarrow Records, 2009)
- ¡Hasta La Muerte! (Red Scare Industries/Koolarrow Records, 2007)
- Brazo En Brazo (Koolarrow Records, 2010)
- Been Drinkin' Again (7" picture disc on Pirates Press Records, 2013)
