= World Music Festival Chicago =

Annual American music festival

- Genre: World music
- Dates: September
- Locations: Chicago, Illinois, US
- Years active: 1999–present
- Website: City of Chicago

The World Music Festival Chicago is an annual musical event held in Chicago, Illinois, since 1999. It is organized by the City of Chicago. The festival takes place in September, usually runs 5–10 days, and has featured musicians from over 75 countries since its inception.

== Featured performers ==
Performers at the festival have included:

- Rahim AlHaj
- Maria de Barros
- Bomba Estereo
- Fatoumata Diawara
- Los Gaiteros de San Jacinto
- Sergent Garcia
- Hanggai
- Slavic Soul Party!
- Staff Benda Bilili
- Sidi Toure
