= Harmful =

German band

- Origin: Frankfurt, Germany
- Genres: Alternative rock, noise rock
- Years active: 1992-2014, 2025-
- Label: Nois-o-lution
- Members: Aren Emirze; Chris Aidonopoulos; Nico Heimann
- Past members: Florian Weber (2011-2013); Billy Gould (2007)
- Website: http://www.harmfulweb.de/

Harmful is a rock band from Frankfurt, Germany, founded in 1992 and frequently compared to early Helmet and more occasionally to Blackmail. The band has released eight albums to date, the first two and the last three on independent labels (BluNoise, Steamhammer and Nois-o-lution), the third (which was produced by Dave Sardy, who also produced their album Cause) and fourth via BMG.

2007 saw the release of Harmful's seventh album, aptly titled 7, produced by Billy Gould, member of Faith No More (who were on an indefinite hiatus at the time). Gould has subsequently joined the band as a fourth member and also took part in the tour supporting the album in early 2007.

In the past, Harmful has toured with bands like Slayer, Machine Head, Clutch, Paradise Lost, Therapy?, LaFaro, and Helmet.

The band disbanded in 2014, after touring for their last album Sick and tired of being sick and tired.

To celebrate their 30th anniversary, the original line-up played two live shows in 2025, their first in 11 years. They played a short tour in autumn 2026, with one date postponed to 2027.

== Discography ==
- 1995: Harmful (BluNoise)
- 1997: Apoplexy.136 (BluNoise)
- 2000: Counterbalance (Firestarter/BMG)
- 2001: Wromantic (Firestarter/BMG)
- 2003: Sanguine (Steamhammer/SPV)
- 2005: Sis Masis (Nois-o-Lution/Indigo)
- 2007: 7 (Nois-o-Lution/Indigo)
- 2010: Cause (PIAS Recordings)
- 2013: Sick and tired of being sick and tired (PIAS Recordings)
