= Flattbush =

American heavy metal band

- Origin: Bellflower, California, United States
- Genres: Grindcore, thrash metal, speed metal
- Years active: 1994–present
- Labels: Koolarrow
- Members: Arman Maniago; Enriko Maniago; Bradley Walther
- Past members: Joe Luevano; Ray Banda; Eric Long; Anthony Gonzales; Brian Legaspi
- Website: flattbush.com

Flattbush is a heavy metal band from Bellflower, California, a small city within South Central Los Angeles county. The group was established in early 1993 by Enrico Maniago (vocals), Brian Legaspi (lead guitar), Eric Long (rhythm guitar), Arman Maniago (bass guitar), and Anthony Gonzales (drums). Brian Legaspi exited the group in 1994, the band then became a quartet. Flattbush performed numerous high school and college concerts before entering into the Southern California and Orange County, California bar and club circuit. In 1998, Flattbush made a name for themselves by opening for Melt Banana of Japan. In 1999, Drummer Anthony Gonzales resigned and was replaced by Ramon Banda. Founding member of Faith No More, Billy Gould, signed the band onto his label, Koolarrow Records, in 2001. Flattbush opened a show for Napalm Death of Birmingham, England in 2002.

In 2002, guitarist Eric Long resigned and was then replaced by guitarist Bradley Walther. Flattbush recorded their Koolarrow Records debut, Smash The Octopus, produced by Bill Gould that same year and released in 2003. Following Flattbushs' first tour of the United States in 2003, Ramon Banda resigned and was replaced by drummer Joe Luevano before their second headlining tour of the United States in 2004 and again in 2005. Flattbush maintains a legacy for being one of the most underground and wildest acts in Grindcore.

== Smash the Octopus ==
Smash the Octopus was Flattbush's debut release for Koolarrow Records, consisting of 13 tracks recorded and mixed in April 2003 in San Francisco by Billy Gould (Faith No More) and engineered by Mark Pistel (Meat Beat Manifesto, Consolidated, Spearhead).

== Seize the Time ==
Flattbush's second album Seize the Time was released on September 9, 2006, produced once again by Billy Gould. The band plans to tour the U.S. and abroad.

== Politics ==
Flattbush's lyrical content had mainly focused on Anti-imperialism, exploring politics and current events since 1996. In addition, Flattbush has openly espoused Marxism and leftist ideals, and glorifying the People's Movement in their website, lyrics, liner notes, and imagery since 2001.

== Discography ==
- Bowel's Why We're Here (1994)
- Bored Again/Born Again (1994)
- Disco Death (1995)
- Expose/Oppose (1997)
- Smash the Octopus (2000)
- Kontra 'Tado (2001)
- Smash the Octopus (2003) Koolarrow Records
- Seize the Time (2006) Koolarrow Records
- Otomatik Attak! (2010) Koolarrow Records
- Strategic Offensive (2018) Self-released
