= Album of the Year (Faith No More album) =

Studio album by Faith No More
- Released: June 3, 1997
- Studios: Brilliant and Razor's Edge (San Francisco)
- Genre: Alternative metal
- Length: 43:00
- Labels: Slash; Reprise
- Producers: Roli Mosimann; Billy Gould

Faith No More chronology
King for a Day... Fool for a Lifetime (1995)	Album of the Year (1997)	Sol Invictus (2015)

Singles from Album of the Year
- 1. "Ashes to Ashes" Released: May 19, 1997; 2. "Last Cup of Sorrow" Released: August 5, 1997; 3. "Stripsearch" Released: November 11, 1997

Album of the Year is the sixth studio album by American rock band Faith No More, released on June 3, 1997, by Slash and Reprise Records. It is the first album to feature guitarist Jon Hudson, and was their last studio album before their eleven-year hiatus from 1998 to 2009. Album of the Year has been described by AllMusic as being "more straightforward musically than past releases." Three singles were released from the album: "Ashes to Ashes", "Last Cup of Sorrow", and "Stripsearch", all of which had accompanying music videos.

The album experienced success in some foreign countries, including Australia, New Zealand and Germany. It managed to top the charts in Australia and New Zealand, in addition to going Platinum in Australia. In the United States, however, it largely continued the band's declining critical and commercial response. "Last Cup of Sorrow" was the only single from the album to chart in the United States, after their previous album King for a Day... Fool for a Lifetime failed to have any singles chart in the United States.

During 1997, different versions of the album were released in Australia, Europe and Japan, with these editions containing bonus B-sides and electronic remixes. In 2016, a remastered deluxe edition with most of the bonus material was released, as part of a reissue of the band's albums.

== Recording ==
Album of the Year guitarist Jon Hudson joined the band in 1996, after the departure of Dean Menta.

In a 1997 interview with SFGate, Gould reflected on the making of the album, saying, "very rarely were we all in the same city at the same time. If we were lucky, there'd be a three-week window, and then we'd practice as much as we could and record at the end of the period." Roddy Bottum similarly recalled that "everybody's schedule was hectic. And so it was a situation of making the record around people's other projects."

When compared to previous releases with Mike Patton, there was less of a break between this album and 1995's King for a Day... Fool for a Lifetime, which came out three years after their fourth album Angel Dust. Gould noted that a reason for this was since they cut short the tour for King for a Day...Fool for a Lifetime, instead of "[touring] it to death for a year or so until we're sick of each other." Gould said that they cut the tour short in order to focus on another album, believing that this would help give them some momentum going into it. When the band first started writing new material with Menta, most of the members were still focused on Faith No More rather than their side projects, unlike with the later writing sessions. As early demo work on Album of the Year was beginning between Mike Bordin, Bottum, Gould and Menta, Patton was busy performing with Mr. Bungle, who were in the midst of their Disco Volante run of shows. They wrote 12 songs with Menta, and eight ended up being completely discarded. Bottum stated in a June 1997 interview with Australian paper The Herald Sun that "we decided we'd just write a bunch of songs and keep the songwriting as simple as possible and just go into the studio and record as quickly as possible. That was the way we used to write stuff when we started the band, just really simple repetitive riffs without a whole lot of thought. And Mike came back from his tour with Mr. Bungle, and he only liked about half of the songs, and only felt like he could sing on about half of the songs." According to Gould, the songs they wrote with Menta were "too nice", saying "they were pop songs, but there wasn't enough feeling, enough balls." Bottum theorized that Patton didn't like the songs they wrote with Menta since "he's more inclined to not do something that's a little poppier."

Following this round of demo work and the firing of Menta, the members pursued other projects, leaving the band on the verge of splitting (because of this, Album of the Year has since been labelled as a "miracle baby"). Gould said after Menta's firing "the momentum just shut down and everybody went off and started doing their side stuff." Bottum went out on tour to support the debut album of his Imperial Teen side project, Bordin left to tour with Black Sabbath for six months, and Mike Patton flew to Italy to be with his wife Cristina Zuccatosta, who he had married in 1994. Gould himself spent a few months travelling Europe. While in Albania, he came up with the song "Mouth to Mouth", which was inspired by the "loud arabic music" he heard on the streets there. Gould then returned to San Francisco to focus on the album with Hudson, who entered Faith No More during this period of inactivity between the collective group. A reason Gould was committed to working on the album without Bordin, Bottum and Patton was since Faith No More still contractually owed a few more albums to their record company, which was part of the major label system and owned by Warner Music Group. Hudson was a former member of the Oakland band Systems Collapse, and had first met Faith No More during the touring cycle for 1989's The Real Thing. Hudson remembered in 2015 that the band seemed disjointed, since the members were focusing their energies on other projects at that time. He added, "I felt like this might be their last record, so I wanted to make sure I enjoyed it as much as I could."

After Gould and Hudson spent time working on the album together, the other three members eventually laid down some basic tracks, with Bordin having finished his touring commitments with Black Sabbath by the time this happened. However, all five of them were never in the same city as each other during this period. Gould remembered that Patton would often say he would be coming over from Italy to work on the album, but would miss deadlines. Gould further said that Patton would only give them an hour of his time when he flew over from Italy. Patton's behavior led Gould to snap out at him in the studio, with Gould angrily saying to Patton "this is it. It isn't working. I'm out. I'm done." Bottum still continued to tour with Imperial Teen even after Bordin had finished touring with Black Sabbath. Gould said Bottum briefly gravitated back towards Faith No More, but was quickly "out of the band" again and wouldn't show up to rehearsals. He also recalls that Bottum was starting to do magazine interviews where he was claiming that Imperial Teen was now his main band. Gould remembered that, "Jon and me probably worked on that record the most. But everyone wanted me to work. Puffy [Mike Bordin] would call me up and tell me things like, 'Get Patton on board. We got to do this. We got to do this.' Everybody was getting me to fight everybody else's battles."

During early 1997, all five members finally reconvened in San Francisco, with Swiss producer Roli Mosimann, who is the long-standing collaborator of industrial rock band The Young Gods, a major influence on Faith No More. Patton had written two new songs while away in Italy with his wife, including "Home Sick Home". Patton wrote these songs in just a day, and he came up not only with the lyrics, but also the drums, guitar and bass.

Mosimann encouraged the band to utilize computer-based recording/editing software Pro Tools, something they had not done before. Gould stated, "he said there were some things that he'd like to change in Pro Tools. A good example of Roli's editing was the song 'Mouth to Mouth.' It wasn't sounding right to us at all. It was almost a throwaway song. But Roli really liked that one, so he ended up taking the [acoustic] drums in the choruses and moving them to the verses in Pro Tools. It gave the song a whole new life."

Once they finished recording, the songs were sent off to Masterdisk in New York to be mastered by Howie Weinberg, and the individual members spent time preparing for the upcoming tour in support of the album. The impending Album of the Year tour would end up sidetracking a covers album Mike Patton had planned on doing with Mr. Bungle. Faith No More's upcoming album was announced to the media around the time recording was completed in 1997, and a June release date had already been finalized. The album was still untitled at that point. In later press releases from closer to the release date, the title Album of the Year was revealed, and a track listing was given out which had the eventual B-sides "Light Up & Let Go" and "The Big Kahuna" as the 13th and 14th tracks. It was being touted as a return to the band's "heavy guitar" and "funky bass" sound.

== Music ==
=== Style ===
Album of the Year features elements of several genres, including heavy metal, punk, boogie rock, circus music, country, doo-wop, funk, gothic rock, hip hop, Middle Eastern music, R&B, trip-hop and soul. However, it has been considered as less diverse than their previous release King for a Day... Fool for a Lifetime, which explored an even wider array of genres.

The album's music displayed a more melancholic sound overall than previous releases. Gould said at the time, "it just turned out to be that way that the new material is more melodic, slower and more atmospheric. It was important for me that the album has a general mood that can be found in all songs and that it doesn't go in too many directions like we did in the past." Patton commented, "It's got more feelings and balance than our previous albums. Possibly it's darker too." In a September 1997 article focusing on the making of the album with Keyboard magazine, Gould further said, "Angel Dust was like a hurricane coming — a big, ugly storm. King for a Day was like when the storm was hitting you, with all this stuff flying all over the place. And this record... this record is kind of like digging through the wreckage and pulling out bodies afterwards." Shortly before Album of the Year was released, San Francisco paper East Bay Times claimed it was "by and large, a heavy metal album", and that other styles like punk and R&B have been "sprinkled in". In a July 1997 issue of CMJ, Scott Frampton described the album's overall genre as "bi-polar metal", claiming that it was similar to bands such as Mr. Bungle, Korn and Tool. He added that the boastful album title was fitting since "the band’s strange amalgam of sounds has always had a crazy audacity to it anyway." In a June 1997 issue of Hits magazine, Karen Gluber wrote that it "leans more towards avant-thrashism than the soul pop hybrid in which the group has dabbled, but their versatility is still very much on display here." In June 1997, Metal Hammer's Dan Silver believed it resembled King for a Day... Fool for a Lifetime more than any other Faith No More album. He said it contrasted the more linear sound they had on The Real Thing, and was a continuation of their "increasingly eclectic [output] over the years, wildly ricocheting from one genre to the next, one mood to another." "Collision", "Stripsearch", "Ashes to Ashes" and "Naked in Front of the Computer" were cited by him as example of tracks on the album which all sounded different to each other, and he added that "variety is essentially their biggest asset".

In 2014, The Guardian labelled "Ashes to Ashes" as having "a memorably anthemic chorus that soared", while Christopher R. Weingarten of Spin characterized the whole album as having "epic, majestic choruses" in 2012. In 2016, Bottum remembered that the band were listening to many contemporary electronic artists during this period, including Tricky, Massive Attack, Portishead and DJ Shadow, and during the previous tour for King for a Day... Fool for a Lifetime, the band had often included in their setlists a cover of the Portishead song "Glory Box". A contemporary electronic sound can be heard on Album with the Year, with the single "Stripsearch". It has been described as a trip-hop song, and incorporates heavy metal guitars towards the end. "She Loves Me Not" is a soft R&B ballad drawing from doo-wop and lounge music. "Mouth to Mouth" uses rap-style vocals from Patton in the verses, and has elements of Middle Eastern music, which were inspired from Gould's trip to Albania during the making of the album. It has also been considered to have elements of circus music, with critics labeling it as reminiscent of Patton's other band Mr. Bungle, who were known to explore that style. "Helpless" is a slow paced acoustic ballad with distorted guitars during the chorus; it ends with Patton screaming for help as the music fades out. Karen Gluber of Hits magazine called it "spacey", while in June 1997 Canadian publication RPM wrote that both it and "She Loves Me Not" were songs which showcased Patton's "intense vocal skills". AllMusic described "Home Sick Home" as having a boogie rock sound, while Patton himself labelled it as "country music" during an October 1997 concert in Vancouver, Canada. The band had previously experimented with country music on Angel Dust and King for a Day...Fool for a Lifetime, with the songs "RV" and "Take this Bottle". Patton would continue to explore country/western sounds with his rock supergroup Tomahawk, who formed shortly after the 1998 disbandment of Faith No More. PopMatters wrote in 2016 that "Home Sick Home" had a conventional hard rock bridge which "partially undermined" the experimentation in the rest of the song, and that this was similar to how "Stripsearch" incorporated heavy metal guitars towards the end.

=== Songs and lyrics ===
"Got that Feeling" and "Naked in Front of the Computer" are two of the more punk-influenced tracks; the songs are among some of the only songs in the Faith No More catalogue to be written solely by Mike Patton. In the September 1997 interview with Keyboard magazine, Billy Gould described "Got That Feeling" as being about a compulsive gambler, and said it would make for an "amazing" music video. In the early years of online filesharing, "Naked in Front of the Computer" was sometimes incorrectly labelled as being an Incubus song, with the title of "Naked". When asked about the meaning of "Naked in Front of the Computer", Gould replied to Keyboard magazine:

Actually, this song is about email. Patton is kind of obsessed with the idea of how people can communicate and have relationships over the computer without talking or ever meeting. So this is an extreme version of that concept. Funny thing is...the image of someone sitting naked in front of a computer might not have made sense to people a few years ago, but now everybody knows what it means. It's become part of our culture.

— Billy Gould (1997),

"She Loves Me Not" is the lightest song on the album, due to its R&B musical influence and falsetto vocals from Patton. It was to be the fourth single off the album, but the band ended before this could be accomplished. Despite this, it made an appearance on Faith No More's 2006 greatest hits compilation The Platinum Collection. When asked about the song, Gould replied:

This song almost didn't make it on the record. We almost didn't even record vocals for it because it's so different from all of the other songs. I wrote this song, and I was almost embarrassed to play it for anybody in the band because it's so soft – but at the same time it's a good song. It's like a Boyz II Men song or something. I didn't play it for anybody for, like, a half a year, and then finally I played it for Puffy. He thought we should give it a try, so I gave it to Patton, and he said, 'I wrote words, but they're pretty over-the-top.' But we went forward with it, and he really sang his ass off.

— Billy Gould (1997),

"Pristina" is a song written about the then ongoing conflicts in the Balkans (named after the capital of Kosovo), with it being the final track of the band's career for nearly two decades. Artistdirect state it "stands out as arguably the most beautiful song in Faith No More's catalog." The song was inspired by a trip Gould made to the Balkans, following a 1995 German tour with Faith No More. When interviewed by Serbian Times, he reminisced, "at that time no one in America knew what was happening there, American press didn't write about that [...] That place left a deep impression on me." In 1997, Gould also noted that "Pristina" required substantial EQ work in the studio to get all the instruments sounding clear, since "there are so many big open chords of distorted guitar, which doesn't leave much room for anything else." Kerrang! wrote in 1997 that the song's melodies were reminiscent of The Smashing Pumpkins. A piano-based remix of the song by Gould appears on some editions of the album, along with several electronic-based remixes of other songs, made by people from outside the band. Gould said of the remix, "the reason I did it was because, well, I wrote the song, and at the time, the way remixers were going, there was a certain sameness [going on]; I didn’t want to just give [the track] to some remixer who was going to turn into like some kind of industrial house music song or something." He added that his remix took the song to "almost a smooth jazz level."

Multiple references to cinema are made throughout Album of the Year. The track "Paths of Glory" is named after the 1957 film of the same name, while "Helpless" contains the line "I even tried to get arrested today", which is taken from the 1965 film The Slender Thread. The "Stripsearch" line "F for Fake" references the 1973 film of the same name. "Helpless" utilizes organ-like sounds in the verses. Despite this, no real organs were used on the song; the sounds were instead created via a patch on Bottum's Roland JV-1080 synthesizer. There are also whistling effects towards the end of the song. When it was performed live for the first time in October 1997, the whistling was replaced by backing vocals. Like "Pristina", "Paths of Glory" is a slower song that uses heavy amounts of guitar distortion, with PopMatters also describing it as having a goth-influenced sound in 2016. Gould said in 1997 that "Paths of Glory" was "all about a mood. It's not: 'Entertain me.' It's a vibe." Some critics have considered it to be one of the weaker songs on the album, citing the sluggish tone of it. It was only performed four times, during the very early stages of the Album of the Year tour, being completely absent during the rest of the tour. When the band reunited in 2009, it did not return to their setlists. Gould has mentioned that the band almost never played the Angel Dust songs "Malpractice" and "Smaller and Smaller" since their mid-tempo nature didn't translate well to live settings, which could explain why they rarely played "Paths of Glory".

The opening track "Collision" was ranked by Metal Hammer as the fifth heaviest Faith No More song in 2016. It features low, harsh synths that almost mimic a bass. Gould says, "a lot of the really cool sounds in this song that sound like guitar are actually keyboard string sounds running through a Tech 21 SansAmp. You can really mangle keyboard sounds with a SansAmp; you can get some amazing dark, ugly textures." The song's verses have samples of a Spanish-language broadcast from shortwave radio, with it being Patton's idea to include this. Patton and Gould both owned shortwave radios at the time, and Patton would often bring his with him on tours. Gould noted in 1997 that "you can get some really cool, eerie stuff" from them, noting that shortwave radio samples were also used on the 1994 Nine Inch Nails album The Downward Spiral.

Billy Gould claimed in 1998 that Hudson came up with the original idea for the song, and the other members "changed it just a little bit". They added an electronic loop to the beginning of it, which Gould believed help make the song go from sounding like a Queensrÿche song to a Portishead song. At one show with Limp Bizkit in September 1997, Bottum jokingly said to the crowd that "Stripsearch" was based on a movie with Demi Moore that failed at the box office. He was likely referencing her recent film Striptease, and the song's cinematic sound.

Gould has said that his bass playing on "Last Cup of Sorrow" was influenced by dub music. He thought the song's slow, heavy sound was reminiscent of a local San Francisco band called Chrome, who he described in 1998 as "kind of like punk that was very heavy metal, but dark and foreboding... very cinematic". "Last Cup of Sorrow" has sounds throughout which Gould said resemble a toy piano. This idea started out as a loop from Gould while he was working on the song's bass parts, and it ended up being added to the song as a major rhythmic element. Patton has effects on his voice in the song, with Gould saying they "compressed the shit" out his voice. The song has hopeful yet introspective lyrics, with the narrator in the chorus encouraging one to finish a last cup of sorrow so they can possibly move onto something happier, with the line "you might surprise yourself" being repeated after the chorus. The band never explicitly said to themselves that Album of the Year was going to be their last album when they were making it, but some have still noted that the song's lyrics paralleled the band's eventual breakup not long after the album's release. Even though the lyrics were written entirely by Patton, Gould said in 1998 that they were all on the "same page" with him on it, adding that the lyrics are "depressing, but beautiful at the same time. As an album, it was our death record and it was something to feel, something we were going through." Both Jon Hudson and Mike Bordin have since stated that they subconsciously felt like Album of the Year could be their last album as they were making it. For "Last Cup of Sorrow", Patton reused the lyric "raise a glass and toast to the thing that hurts you the most". This lyric originally appeared in Mr. Bungle's song "Bloody Mary", from their 1988 demo Goddammit I Love America!. The song had different lyrical themes than "Last Cup of Sorrow", which revolved around female menstruation. A remix for "Last Cup of Sorrow" by German band Rammstein appeared on some editions of Album of the Year. Rammstein were labelmates of Faith No More at Slash Records, and a Faith No More remix of the Rammstein song "Du riechst so gut" was released the following year. Rammstein later sampled their "Last Cup of Sorrow" remix on "Nebel", the closing track of their 2001 album Mutter.

"The Big Kahuna" and "Light Up & Let Go" were originally intended to appear on the album, although they ended up appearing as B-sides and as bonus tracks for the Japanese edition. According to Mike Patton, "The Big Kahuna" was cut from the final track listing since it did not fit in with the rest of the album. He also claimed the song's title was not a reference to the Big Kahuna restaurant from Quentin Tarantino's Pulp Fiction.

The band recorded approximately two dozen songs during the Album of the Year sessions. However, almost no unreleased material from the sessions has ever surfaced. Patton said, "we did about 7 or 8 songs that won't appear on the album. I don't know if they will ever appear somewhere. It's like cookin' coffee...you have to throw it away when it's kinda bitter. The main problem all of the time was: are the songs good enough for the album or should we write some more. it's difficult to find the right balance. First we had too many commercial songs, then there were too many heavy songs." The only unreleased outtake to have emerged is the song "Instrumental", which appeared on the 1998 compilation Who Cares a Lot? The Greatest Hits. It has often been mislabelled as being from the 1994–1995 King for a Day... Fool for a Lifetime era sessions, and was even included on the 2016 deluxe edition for that album.

== Artwork and title ==
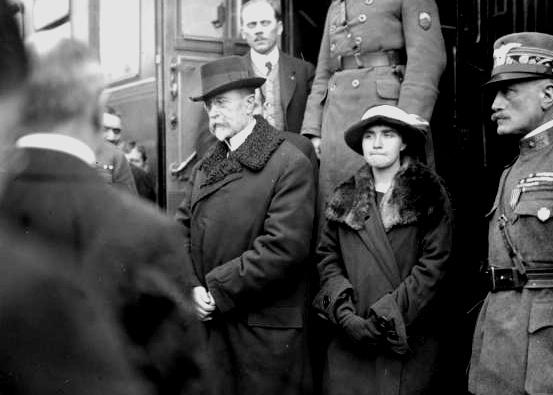
Czechoslovak president Tomáš Garrigue Masaryk (pictured in 1918) is featured on the cover.

The photograph on the front cover depicts Czechoslovakia's first president, Tomáš Garrigue Masaryk (who died on the eve of World War II), who is also regarded as the country's founding father.

The album jacket depicts the funeral of Masaryk, with the words "pravda vítězí" (truth prevails), the motto of the Czech Republic, adorning his coffin. Album of the Year's artwork was handled by the band and Katherine Delaney, and was done in 1997, after the album had been recorded and mixed. It was Gould's idea to incorporate Masaryk, since he had become fascinated with European history while on his travels throughout the area. Gould viewed Masaryk's death as signaling the end of an era for Czechoslovakia, since it used to be one of the richest countries in the world while he was in charge, before being plunged into turmoil during World War II. Regarding the usage of Masaryk's funeral in the artwork, Gould said in 2002, "if there is any symbolic importance, it is the depiction of the death of a 'golden age.'"

The artwork was reflected with the band frequently wearing black suits during their tour in support of the album, a trend that carried over to their 2009 reunion tour.

While the album sleeve did not feature printed lyrics, Mike Patton and Billy Gould did submit official lyrics to fnm.com, which was a fan controlled site prior to the band's reformation in 2009.

In an August 1997 Rolling Stone interview, Bottum claimed they chose the title Album of the Year as a joke, saying "we thought it was funny that anyone who'd write about the record would have to write Album of the Year."

== Touring and promotion ==
Album of the Year was supported by a large scale tour that covered various regions, including Australia, New Zealand, Japan, Europe and North America. It lasted from April 1997 to December 1997, and unlike previous tours with Patton, did not cover Latin America. The performances in April 1997 were the band's first in over a year, as they had not played any shows during 1996. Artists that Faith No More shared bills with in 1997 include the Bloodhound Gang, Coal Chamber, Creed, Days of the New, Flapjack, Foo Fighters, Godsmack, Helmet, Jimmie's Chicken Shack, Our Lady Peace, Machine Head, Marilyn Manson, Megadeth, The Nixons, Rammstein, Rollins Band, Seven Mary Three, Silverchair, Sugar Ray and Veruca Salt, among others. During early April 1998, Faith No More reconvened for three festival dates in Spain and Portugal. These would end up being their last shows in over 10 years, as they announced their split on April 19, 1998. For these shows in early 1998, the band wore casual clothing, in contrast to the shows from the previous year, where they wore funereal-style clothing. Faith No More had originally been scheduled to support Aerosmith on their 1998 European tour for Nine Lives, but these plans were cancelled following their breakup.

When the album was released in mid-1997, Mike Bordin was called in to perform with Ozzy Osbourne for that year's edition of Ozzfest, which ran from May 24 to July 1. This resulted in Robin Guy (of the band Rachel Stamp) filling in on drums for Bordin during a UK Top of the Pops performance on May 30, as well as an absence of any Faith No More shows during the month of June. Shortly after Bordin returned from Ozzfest, the band had to cancel four July dates in Europe, so Bordin could attend the birth of his first daughter in San Francisco.

The Album of the Year tour is notable for featuring Limp Bizkit, a nu metal band influenced by Faith No More, as an opener for several US dates in the fall of 1997. They had just recently released their debut album Three Dollar Bill, Y'all, and were frequently booed by Faith No More's fans, including during a September 1997 concert at the Electric Factory in Philadelphia, where the crowd booed them off stage during the middle of their set. In a 2013 interview, Roddy Bottum reflected on the shows with Limp Bizkit, recalling "I fought it at the time. I had to really push to get a couple bands that I liked to get on the bill in Portland and Seattle on that leg. I had no interest in the sound of Limp Bizkit. It was not how I wanted to be represented at all. Not to be snotty at all, but that guy Fred Durst had a really bad attitude. He was kind of a jerk." Bottum also remembered an incident where Durst "called the audience faggots at one show when they booed him". Durst apologized to him after this show, as he did not know that Bottum had come out as gay in the early '90s. Limp Bizkit's guitarist Wes Borland later claimed that his band were excited about the prospect of getting to tour with Faith No More, stating "the idea of it was cool [but] once we got there, it was a really tough crowd. They have a really tough crowd to please, who are very vocal about not liking you. We opened for Faith No More and Primus in the same year, and the Primus tour went a lot better than the Faith No More tour." Borland added that he did not get to know Mike Patton personally until several years later, when he met him through Tool guitarist Adam Jones.

For the Album of the Year tour, an intro tape was used at the beginning of shows, which contained "Also sprach Zarathustra", followed by an Elvis-style fanfare clip announcing Faith No More as being from Caesars Palace, Las Vegas. During the tour, they would cover "Ain't Talkin' 'bout Dub" by Apollo 440, "Barbie Girl" by Aqua, "Buffalo Stance" by Neneh Cherry, "Easy" by the Commodores, "Fever" by Peggy Lee, "Gin and Juice" by Snoop Dogg, "Gotham City" by R. Kelly, "Guarda che luna" by Fred Buscaglione, "Highway Star" by Deep Purple, "I Believe I Can Fly" by R. Kelly, "I Started a Joke" by the Bee Gees, "Men in Black" by Will Smith, the Midnight Cowboy theme by John Barry, "Move Your Ass!" by Scooter, "Need You Tonight" by INXS, "Phenomenon" by LL Cool J, "This Guy's in Love with You" by Herb Alpert, "This Town Ain't Big Enough for Both of Us" by Sparks, "I Want to Know What Love Is" by Foreigner, "Ice Ice Baby" by Vanilla Ice and "Wanted Dead or Alive" by Bon Jovi. Some of these covers only included parts of the songs, while others were full-length covers. Faith No More covered parts of INXS's "Need You Tonight" at a November 27, 1997 in Hanover, Germany, with this cover coming just five days after the death of the band's lead singer Michael Hutchence. Following Faith No More's split, INXS would offer Patton a role as their new lead singer, but he turned them down. This was the first tour since Patton joined where they did not perform any Black Sabbath covers. At one show, Patton said to the audience that they were going to play Black Sabbath's "War Pigs" next, but they instead played the soft song "Stripsearch". During the band's shows in late 1997 and early 1998, they performed the 1974 Sparks song "This Town Ain't Big Enough for Both of Us". Earlier in 1997, Faith No More had collaborated with Sparks to record a new studio version of this song, and it appeared on Sparks' album Plagiarism (1997). The album included another collaboration with Faith No More called "Something for the Girl with Everything", although this song was never performed live by Faith No More. "This Town Ain't Big Enough for Both of Us" had originally appeared on the Sparks album Kimono My House (1974), while "Something for the Girl with Everything" appeared on their album Propaganda (1974). The collaborations with Sparks came about after they found out Faith No More were fans of them, with Gould saying in 1997, "Sparks were the first really campy operatic-type band. I always thought Queen ripped them off."

Faith No More's setlists for the tour mainly consisted of their 1990s material, with songs from Introduce Yourself and The Real Thing being played less frequently than before. However, the track "As the Worm Turns" (from 1985's We Care a Lot) began to appear more often this tour, having been mostly absent throughout the 1995 King for a Day... Fool for a Lifetime tour. It was the last song played at the band's April 7, 1998 concert in Lisbon, Portugal, which was their original final show before splitting. All songs from Album of the Year were played during the tour, with the sole exception of "She Loves Me Not", which still remains one of the only studio album songs Faith No More has never performed live. The two B-sides "The Big Kahuna" and "Light Up & Let Go" were also not played, and have remained unperformed to this day. "Helpless" was only performed a single time on the tour, during the October 26, 1997, show at Festival Hall in Melbourne, Australia.

On the European legs, Faith No More performed in Croatia and Luxembourg, two countries they had never previously visited. In November 1997, they also performed in Russia for the second time, having previously played a single show there in 1993, during the Angel Dust tour. On July 6, 1997, Patton and Gould had also co-hosted MTV's alternative show 120 Minutes, where they discussed the album with Matt Pinfield. The episode featured the video for "Last Cup of Sorrow", as well as the 1988 "We Care a Lot" video, and new videos from other bands, such as Sugar Ray's "Fly", Blink 182's "Dammit" and The Dandy Warhols' "Not If You Were the Last Junkie on Earth". In September 1997, the music of Sugar Ray and Faith No More was featured together again as part of an episode of Westwood One's Off The Record program, which focused on the two bands. A CD of this broadcast was also made.

=== Music video production ===
To promote the album, the band shot videos for the singles "Ashes to Ashes", "Last Cup of Sorrow" and "Stripsearch". The first video they did was "Last Cup of Sorrow", with director Joseph Kahn. It was shot in San Francisco, around the time the album was released. However, "Ashes to Ashes" would be the first single released to radio stations. The idea for the "Last Cup of Sorrow" video originated from Kahn, who was chosen by the band from a list of directors who had submitted ideas, and was a parody of the 1958 film Vertigo, which the band were fans of. It features film actress Jennifer Jason Leigh and has Patton in the role of Jimmy Stewart's character. The band didn't know Jennifer Jason Leigh, and she appeared in the video since they heard she wanted to be in it, with the band meeting her for the first time during the day of the shoot. In a June 28, 1997 issue of Billboard, Kahn said that having Patton in Jimmy Stewart's role was "like blending an old film with this totally weird '90s type of guy." The video for "Ashes to Ashes" was shot afterwards, and has the band performing in a supernatural mansion. It was directed by Tim Royes in Los Angeles at the old Giant Penny building, which was also featured in the 1995 film Seven.

The third and final video for "Stripsearch" was shot in Berlin during late 1997, while the band were on tour in Germany. This video was directed by Philip Stolzt, who is most well known for his work in opera. It depicts Patton walking to a bank and getting apprehended and stripsearched there.

== Commercial response ==
By the time of the band's split in April 1998, it had sold 164,000 copies in the US. As of 2015, the album had sold 221,000 copies in the US. Domestically, this nearly matched the total for King for a Day... Fool for a Lifetime; however, it was a significantly lower figure than that of the other two albums featuring Mike Patton on vocals. On other charts, it fared much better. In Australia, it topped the ARIA charts on June 28, 1997, before being overtaken by Savage Garden's self-titled album on July 4, 1997. It went Platinum in the country for sales of more than 70,000 copies. It also topped the albums chart in New Zealand. The album had less of an impact in the UK charts than previous releases, but it did go gold for sales of more than 100,000 copies.

== Reception ==
Professional ratings
Review scores
Source	Rating
AllMusic	4/5 stars
Entertainment Weekly	B
Fast Forward Weekly	1/5 stars
NME	8/10
Pitchfork	2.4/10
Rolling Stone	1.5/5 stars
Spin	3.5/5 stars
Uncut	1/5 stars

Initially Album of the Year was met with some lukewarm to negative responses from critics in North America. Rolling Stone's Lorraine Ali gave the album one-and-a-half stars out of five on June 16, 1997, commenting that the band "...are floundering around desperately, groping for a sense of identity and direction in a decade that clearly finds them irrelevant". Pitchfork gave the album a similarly negative review, stating, "Album Of The Year leaves one feeling like waking up and finding last night's used condom – sure, the ride was fun while it lasted, but what remains is just plain icky. And you definitely don't want it in your CD player." In December 1997, Entertainment Weekly included it on their "flop albums" of 1997 list, despite initially giving the album a positive review on June 20, 1997.

Canadian publication Fast Forward Weekly awarded it only one out of five stars in their issue for the week of June 12 – June 18, 1997. The review states, "sure, mixing metal pomp, punk attitude and white boy funk/rap may have seemed like a fresh idea at the time, but things have (thankfully) changed. It just doesn't seem like FNM's tired grind of big riffs and Patton's operatic yowling could have much impact on your average suburban spaz when groups like Rage Against the Machine, although equally annoying (and admittedly the direct progeny of FNM), at least deliver on the pre-teen adrenaline rush." Joshua Sindell of Phoenix New Times wrote, "the usual intense concentration placed on the work has been leached away by side projects, such as Bottum's Imperial Teen and Patton's Mr. Bungle; even Bordin has spent most of the past couple of years touring with Ozzy Osbourne's band. Revealingly, AOTY clocks in at roughly a tidy 43 minutes, resulting in FNM's shortest CD in a decade." He concluded his review by proclaiming that Faith No More should "call it a day". A less negative North American review came from MTV's Tom Phalen, he remarked that "this is a very listenable collection, and Faith No More deserves to be more than a one-hit wonder." His review also observed "[It's] clear that the success of new head-pounding youngsters like Korn and Rage Against the Machine hasn't been lost on FNM — 'Naked In Front of the Computer' angrily rails its fists against The Man and his devices."

The San Francisco Chronicle likewise had a positive take on the record, claiming "it has balance, poise, aggression and potential hits. Mike Patton's vocal work is outstanding, with genuine singing emerging from his more guttural bursts. Also, the welcome return of a more involved Bottum restores the full dimension of the band's sound." It went on to praise how the band was still exploring lighter genres in between some of their more metal material, like on songs such as "She Loves Me Not" and "Stripsearch", and it described "Home Sick Home" as "a severely twisted late-night cocktail of a song." The review adds that, "after Album of the Year, it would be nothing short of criminal if the band decided to call it quits." British publication NME labelled it as a "slamdunk return to form" in a June 1997 issue. Shaun Carney of Australian paper The Age considered it an improvement over King for a Day... Fool for a Lifetime, writing, "Album of the Year is no great departure for this veteran San Francisco outfit, but it is more genuine than its ostentatious predecessor, King for a Day, and consequently more durable." Jerry Ewing of Vox magazine held a similar view. He wrote in June 1997, "the traits that propelled them to the forefront of the alternative metal scene in the early 90s, traits that were sadly lacking in 95's abrasive and unfriendly King for a Day... Fool for a Lifetime, have returned."

=== Accolades ===
Accolades for Album of the Year
Year	Publication	Country	Accolade	Rank
1997	Kerrang!	United Kingdom	"Albums of the Year"	10
1997	Triple J	Australia	"Triple J listener's Top 10 Albums of 1997"	7
2020	Metal Hammer	United Kingdom	"The Top 20 Best Metal Albums of 1997"	Unordered

=== Legacy ===
The album developed praise from the wider music community following the band's initial break-up in April 1998. In his retrospective review, Greg Prato of AllMusic gave the album a rating of four stars out of five and described it as being "a fitting way for one of alt-rock's most influential and important bands to end its career." The liner notes for the 2003 compilation This Is It: The Best of Faith No More assert: "If Angel Dust put an exclamation point on Faith No More's trademark sound, the release of their 1997 coda, Album of the Year, planted the ellipses at the end of a career that was as charismatic and riveting as it was jarring." Stereogum referred to it as "a great album" in 2015, and pointed out there was a deeper level of maturity. They wrote "Album of the Year sounds 'mature', a blasphemous term for a band of self-professed oddballs who had a reputation as crass and scatological pranksters [...] All the humor on Album of the Year, right down to its title, feels a bit crestfallen and self-deprecating, as if the band had aged a decade since King for a Day." In the PopMatters review for the 2016 deluxe edition, it is noted the album "was generally maligned as a disappointing swan song for Faith No More when it came out in 1997" and that "revisiting Album of the Year today is a more forgiving experience." In 2020, Louder Sound wrote "Album of the Year is an impressively cinematic album, full of widescreen, panoramic choruses – and Patton's smooth-as-satin vocals have never sounded more handsome. If you don't already own any of this band's music, though, this is not essential listening." In the same year, the magazine named it one of the 20 best metal albums of 1997.

System of a Down drummer John Dolmayan listed it as an album that changed his life for a 2020 Louder Sound feature on ten life-changing albums. Vocalist Kyo of Japanese band Dir En Grey named "Mouth to Mouth" one of his favorite songs. Papa Roach recorded a cover of "Naked in Front of the Computer", with it appearing as a B-side for their 2002 single "She Loves Me Not". Despite sharing the same title, Papa Roach's song "She Loves Me Not" was not a cover of the Faith No More song from Album of the Year. In 2002, a tribute album for Faith No More called Tribute of the Year was released. It featured covers of "Naked in Front of the Computer" by Fountainhead and "Mouth to Mouth" by Tub Ring. "Stripsearch" was covered by three different bands on the album; Basement Love Underground, Victims in Ecstasy and Voodou. In 2014, music collective Twinkle Twinkle Little Rock Star released an album of lullaby covers for Faith No More, with it including "Ashes to Ashes", "Last Cup of Sorrow" and "Mouth to Mouth".

=== Band member views ===
In a 2001 interview at the Wâldrock Festival, Mike Patton said the band broke up after this album since they were starting to make "bad music". According to an April 2002 issue of Kerrang!, both Billy Gould and Mike Bordin regarded it as the band's best release. Bordin reflected on the album on its 25th anniversary in 2022, saying, "I did probably, deep down, expect that to be the last album, because I was contributing to it while I was on tour with Ozzy, which wasn’t a bad thing – I was grateful to be doing both. I was grateful that Bill was spending so much time in his laboratory, cooking things up. I liked the songs. I liked the performances. I liked what we were doing. I felt good about the album, and I was happy with how it came out."

== Track listing ==
Songwriting credits taken from ASCAP.

No.	Title	Writer(s)	Length
1.	"Collision"	Jon Hudson, Mike Patton	3:24
2.	"Stripsearch"	Mike Bordin, Hudson, Billy Gould, Patton	4:29
3.	"Last Cup of Sorrow"	Gould, Patton	4:12
4.	"Naked in Front of the Computer"	Patton	2:08
5.	"Helpless"	Bordin, Gould, Patton	5:26
6.	"Mouth to Mouth"	Bordin, Gould, Hudson, Patton	3:48
7.	"Ashes to Ashes"	Bordin, Roddy Bottum, Gould, Hudson, Patton	3:37
8.	"She Loves Me Not"	Bordin, Gould, Patton	3:29
9.	"Got That Feeling"	Patton	2:20
10.	"Paths of Glory"	Bordin, Bottum, Gould, Hudson, Patton	4:17
11.	"Home Sick Home"	Patton	1:59
12.	"Pristina"	Gould, Patton	3:51
Total length:			43:00

Bonus tracks
No.	Title	Music	Length
13.	"The Big Kahuna" (Japanese or limited edition bonus track)	Bordin, Patton, Hudson, Gould	3:07
14.	"Light Up & Let Go" (Japanese or limited edition bonus track)	Patton	2:20
15.	"Last Cup of Sorrow" (Rammstein mix; limited edition bonus track)		4:23
16.	"Ashes to Ashes" (Hardknox Alternative mix; limited edition bonus track)		6:47
17.	"She Loves Me Not" (Spinna Crazy dub mix; limited edition bonus track)		4:41
18.	"Last Cup of Sorrow" (Sharam Vs FNM Club mix; limited edition bonus track)		7:24
Total length:			71:42

Bonus disc
No.	Title	Length
1.	"Last Cup of Sorrow" (Bigfoot and Wildboy mix)	8:44
2.	"Last Cup of Sorrow" (Bonehead mix)	4:54
3.	"Ashes to Ashes" (Hardknox Horned Hand mix)	6:47
4.	"Ashes to Ashes" (Automatic 5 dub)	6:10
5.	"She Loves Me Not" (Spinna Main mix)	4:41
6.	"Ashes to Ashes" (Dillinja mix)	5:30

Bonus disc (2016 deluxe edition)
No.	Title	Source	Length
1.	"Pristina" (Billy Gould mix)	"Last Cup of Sorrow" single	4:14
2.	"Last Cup of Sorrow" (Roli Mosimann mix)	"Last Cup of Sorrow" single	6:23
3.	"She Loves Me Not" (Spinna Main mix)	Bonus disc of Album of the Year; limited edition	4:36
4.	"Ashes to Ashes" (Automatic 5 dub)	"Ashes to Ashes" CD single	6:05
5.	"Light Up & Let Go"	"Ashes to Ashes" CD single	2:17
6.	"The Big Kahuna"	"Ashes to Ashes" CD single	3:04
7.	"This Guy's in Love with You" (Burt Bacharach, Hal David; live)	"I Started a Joke" single	4:19
8.	"Collision" (Live)	"Stripsearch" CD single	3:28

- Track 4 incorrectly listed as "DJ Icey & Maestro mix"
- Track 7 recorded on October 21, 1997, at the Horden Pavilion, Sydney, Australia by MTV Australia.
- Track 8 recorded on August 27, 1997, at Night Town, Rotterdam, Netherlands.

== Personnel ==
Faith No More

- Mike Patton – vocals
- Jon Hudson – guitar
- Billy Gould – bass guitar
- Roddy Bottum – keyboards
- Mike Bordin – drums

Production

- Roli Mosimann – production, mixing
- Billy Gould – production
- Faith No More – additional production
- Paul Ceppaglia – mixing assistant
- Atom – engineer
- Mike Bogus – engineer
- Daniel Presley – engineer
- Jonathan Burnside – co-engineering
- Howie Weinberg – mastering
- Katherine Delaney – art direction, design

== Charts ==
=== Weekly charts ===
Chart (1997)	Peak position
Australian Albums (ARIA)	1
Austrian Albums (Ö3 Austria)	5
Belgian Albums (Ultratop Flanders)	9
Belgian Albums (Ultratop Wallonia)	44
Canadian Albums (RPM)	35
Dutch Albums (Album Top 100)	31
Finnish Albums (Suomen virallinen lista)	4
French Albums (SNEP)	17
German Albums (Offizielle Top 100)	2
Hungarian Albums (MAHASZ)	5
New Zealand Albums (RMNZ)	1
Norwegian Albums (VG-lista)	5
Scottish Albums (Official Charts)	13
Swedish Albums (Sverigetopplistan)	11
UK Albums (Official Charts)	7
UK Rock & Metal Albums (Official Charts)	1
US Billboard 200	41
Chart (2016)	Peak position
UK Progressive Albums (Official Charts)	16

=== Year-end charts ===
Chart (1997)	Position
Australian Albums (ARIA)	29
German Albums (Offizielle Top 100)	64
New Zealand Albums (RMNZ)	25

== Certifications ==
Region	Certification	Certified units/sales
Australia (ARIA)	Platinum	70,000^{^}
^{^} Shipments figures based on certification alone.

== Release history ==
Release history and formats for Album of the Year
Region	Date	Format	Label
United States	June 3, 1997	CD	Slash/Reprise
Canada	June 3, 1997	CD	Slash/Reprise
Japan	June 6, 1997	CD with 2 bonus tracks	Slash/London
Europe	June 9, 1997	CD with 6 bonus tracks	Slash/London
United Kingdom	June 9, 1997	2×CD	Slash/London
Germany	June 9, 1997	2×CD	Slash/London
Netherlands	June 9, 1997	2×CD	Slash/London
Australia	June 19, 1997	2×CD	Polydor/Slash/London
Europe	1999	CD	Slash/London
Europe	2003	CD	Warner Bros./Slash
Europe	August 23, 2013	Vinyl	Music On Vinyl/Slash
Various	September 9, 2016	2×CD/Vinyl	Slash/Rhino

Initial pressings of the Australian, UK, German and Dutch versions of the album included a bonus remix disc.

It was reissued on CD across Europe in 1999, and then again in 2003 by Warner Bros. Records.

Album of the Year would be the second album in the band's discography to be re-released by Dutch music label Music On Vinyl after Angel Dust. Released on August 26, 2013, the album had a limited pressing run of 2000 hand numbered copies on gold vinyl, as well as on black vinyl which remains available in some retailers.

Album of the Year was released as a deluxe edition on 2016 with two discs; the second disc contains eight bonus tracks.
