= Emergency Blanket (band) =

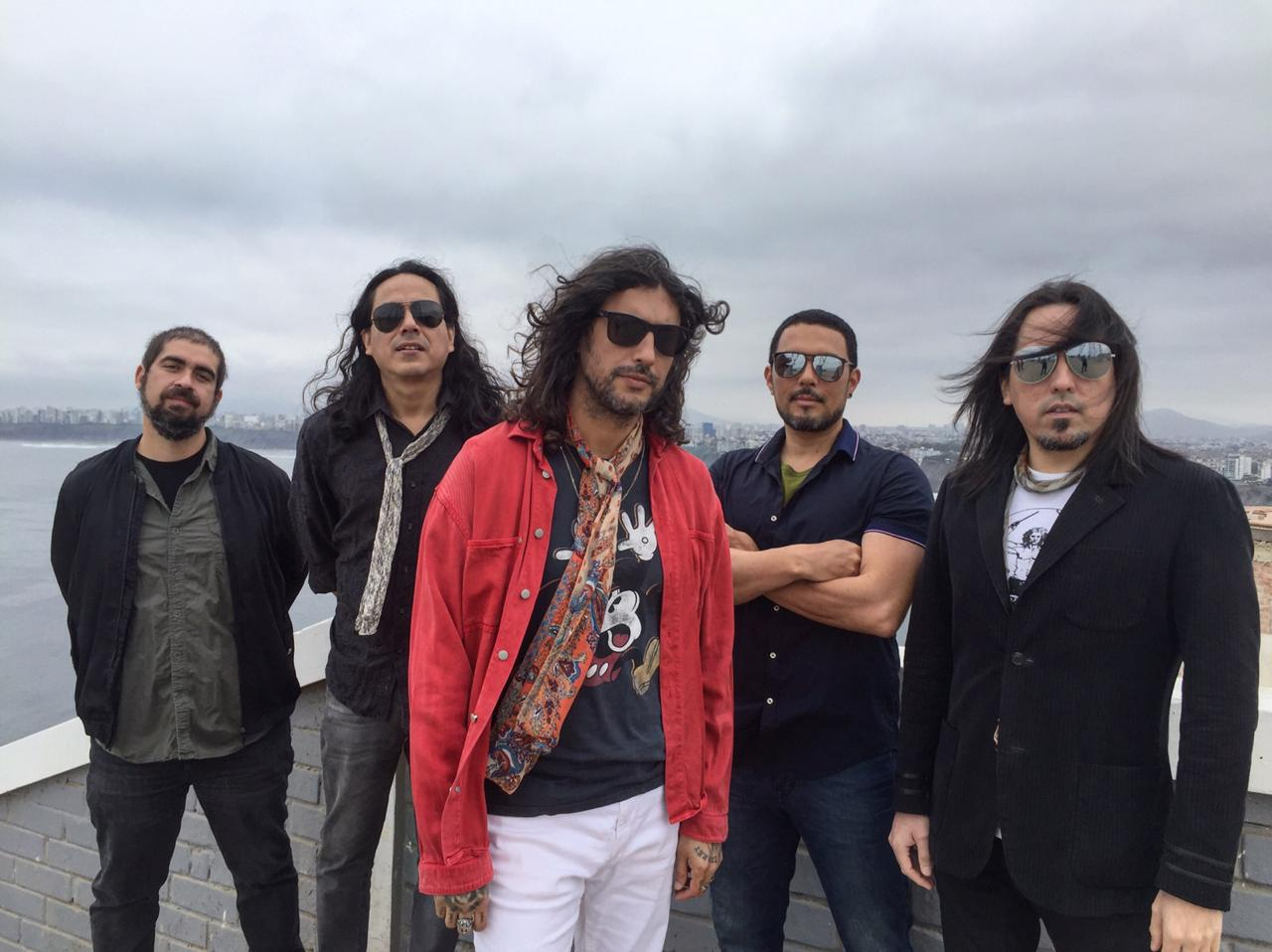

Background information
- Also known as: Ergo Sum
- Origin: Lima, Peru
- Genres: Rock, hard rock
- Years active: 2004-present
- Label: Independent
- Members: Paco Holguin (vocals); Lufo Armestar (bass); Nahim “Brou” Misad (lead guitar); Hans Menacho (drums); Jaime Urteaga (rhythm guitar)
- Past members: Luis Jimenez (lead guitar); Miguel Gistau (lead guitar); Gino Solano (lead guitar); Renzo Solano (lead guitar); Juan Carlos Flores (drums) Jeremy Castillo (drums)
- Website: www.emergency-blanket.com

Emergency Blanket is a rock band formed in 2003.

The band members consist of Paco Holguin (vocals), Lufo Armestar (bass), Jaime Urteaga (rhythm guitar), Hans Menacho (drums), Nahim “Brou” Misad (lead guitar). With influences from rock classics from the 60's, 70's and 90's “the Blankets” achieve a very classical but yet very fresh and original sound. In 2010 they won The People's Music Awards (Metal/Punk/Indie/Rock) in London and also completed their first European tour playing in 3 countries and 9 cities in total.

== History ==
The five original members of the band got together in late 1998 under the name "Ergo Sum" and after years of rehearsing and changing the name they settled for "The Emergency Blanket" and debuted live in 2004 playing in various venues like "Irish Pub" and "La Noche de Barranco" among others.

In March 2008 the band participated in the 1st "Festival Claro" (the most important music event in the country) where they won the "Rock & Pop" Category with their song "La Conexion" which appears in the album "Combi + Nation". Thousands of bands participated in this event. After that they went to play in front of crowds of 15,000+ in cities like Trujillo and Ica in support of Peruvian pop singer Gian Marco Zignago.

In 2009 they opened for Faith No More in their "Second Coming World Tour” in Lima.

In 2010 they won the People's Music Awards (Metal/Punk/Indie/Rock) in London and also completed their first European tour playing in 3 countries and 9 cities in total. In Zurich they opened for legendary Spanish band “Hombres G”.

They received positive comments from the judges at the awards such as “I am very impressed by their energy and enthusiasm and the quality of their writing and playing. Sign them somebody so I can work with them!” - TONY PLATT (Producer: Paul McCartney, Led Zeppelin, Bob Marley, The Who, Rolling Stones among others) and “They show great promise and can expect interest from anyone with ears for good music.” - Mick Glossop (Producer: Van Morrison and Frank Zappa)

Back in Lima they opened for Stone Temple Pilots in their South American leg in Lima, Peru (2010).

In 2011 they participated in the SXSW Music Festival in Austin, TX. They opened for Aerosmith in October 2011.

In December 2012 they opened for Creed in C.C. Maria Angola, Lima, Peru.

In September 2013 they participated in the Dewey Beach Music Conference and played for Sirius XM radio in New York.

In March 2014 they opened for Soundgarden in Estadio Nacional in Lima, Peru.

== Discography ==
The EP "What is the Emergency Blanket?" was recorded in 2005 after a solid year of playing live in various local venues and had rave reviews. That year Rolling Stone Magazine (Hispanic America) released a 2-page article which headed "The band who is breaking the language frontiers in South America". Their song "Next Passenger" was a hit and was played in the most important radio stations in their country.

The LP "Combi + Nation" (2008) was the band's first full fledge album. This production includes a new concept which includes songs in Spanish, English and songs that even combine both languages. This new concept worked well as the band experimented with different sounds and rhythms such as "Lando" a traditional Peruvian genre and "guitarra criolla" a Peruvian style guitar. "Combi + Nation" also makes reference to the diverse and rich culture that Peru represents to the world.

The LP contains 11 tracks and was mixed and mastered at Lima 32 Avenger Studio, Los Angeles, California by Peruvian sound engineer German Villacorta (who has worked with musicians such as Ozzy Osbourne, Mick Jagger and the Rolling Stones, and Stone Temple Pilots, among others) who gave the album a very powerful and rich sound.

The LP "Absenta" (2012) is the third album which contains the single "Survivors" among other favorites like "Think Again" and "You and I". The record was engineered and mixed by German Villacorta and mastered by Dave Collins.

On September 11, 2020, the band released their fourth album called "Musica de Emergencia" the first LP entirely in spanish. It has the singles Caras de Lima, Bluesinfiel, Lejos and Zombies.
