= Stripsearch (song) =

Single by Faith No More

from the album Album of the Year
- Released: June 3, 1997
- Genre: Trip hop
- Length: 4:29
- Label: Slash
- Songwriters: Mike Bordin; Billy Gould; Jon Hudson; Mike Patton
- Producers: Roli Mosimann; Billy Gould

Faith No More singles chronology
"This Town Ain't Big Enough for Both of Us" (1997)	"Stripsearch" (1997)	"I Started A Joke" (1998)

"Stripsearch" is a song from Faith No More's studio sixth album, Album of the Year, and was set for release as a single in November 1997. Promotional CDs were produced and released and the single was added to radio playlists. However, the release was cancelled as the record company London Recordings decided to release their 1995 cover of "I Started a Joke" by the Bee Gees instead.

== Musical style ==
The song was based on a song written by guitarist Jon Hudson, composed in simple MIDI format, hence the heavy electronic sound.

The loop in the beginning made such a difference. Before we put it in, the song sounded more like Queensrÿche. But after the loop, it sounded more like Portishead or something. It gave it a darker, different slant. It didn't sound like a rock band anymore.

— Billy Gould on "Stripsearch"

== Music video ==
The video for "Stripsearch" was filmed in Berlin during 1997. It was directed by Philipp Stölzl, based on a screenplay written by Billy Gould. In the video, Mike Patton walks through parts of the city. At about halfway through he arrives at a military checkpoint and stands at the back of a queue also containing the other members of the band. When he reaches the front, he hands over his passport for inspection. The man inspecting it finds something wrong with the papers and calls the guards on Patton, who tries to get away and is pinned to the floor at gunpoint and arrested. The video then shows still images set earlier in the day, highlighting previously unseen details that point to Patton being a criminal.

== Reception ==
Tom Phalen of MTV said in 1997 that, "despite the inherent brutality of the title, [it] is almost ethereal." NME wrote that the song had "smooth trip-hop rhythms" and "loose, swoozy guitar that sounds like it was recorded in the middle of Monument Valley." In their review of the 2016 deluxe edition for Album of the Year, PopMatters praised the "chilled-out paranoia" of the song.

Australian radio station Triple J ranked it 64th on their annual "Hottest 100" list for the year of 1997.

== Track listing ==
1. "Stripsearch"
2. "Collision" (Live from Night Town, Rotterdam on August 27, 1997)
3. "The Gentle Art of Making Enemies" (Live from Night Town, Rotterdam on August 27, 1997)
4. "Ashes to Ashes" (Live at Phoenix Festival '97 on July 27, 1997)

== Charts ==
Chart (1998)	Peak position
Australia (ARIA)	83
