= Koolarrow Records =

American independent record label

The company logo of Koolarrow Records

Koolarrow Records is an American independent record label based in San Francisco, set up by Faith No More's bass guitarist Billy Gould.

== Current artists ==
- 7notas, 7colores
- Alexander Hacke
- Brujeria
- Como Asesinar a Felipes
- Don Cikuta
- Dureforsog
- Dubioza kolektiv
- Flattbush
- Hog Molly
- Kultur Shock
- La Plebe
- Mexican Dubwiser
- Naive
- Not from There
- The Talking Book
- Unjust

=== Spanglish artists ===
- Announce Predictions
- Aztlan Underground
- Banana Hammock
- Calavera
- Chicle Atomico
- Como Asesinar a Felipes
- Control Machete
- Fractura
- La Flor Del Lingo
- Lil Rudy G.
- El Peyote Asesino
- Puya
- Resorte

== See also ==
- List of record labels
