= Billy Gould =

American bassist (born 1963)

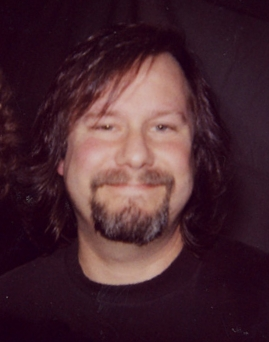
- Gould in 2005

Background information
- Also known as: Güero Sin Fe
- Born: William David Gould; April 24, 1963 (age 63); Los Angeles, California, U.S.
- Origin: San Francisco, California, U.S.
- Genres: Alternative metal; funk metal; experimental rock; alternative rock; hardcore punk; death metal; grindcore; noise rock; avant-garde
- Occupations: Musician; songwriter; producer
- Instrument: Bass guitar
- Years active: 1979–present
- Member of: Faith No More

William David Gould (born April 24, 1963) is an American musician, best known as the bassist for the rock band Faith No More. Having started Faith No More in 1983, he and Mike Bordin are the only constant members of the band, having appeared on all of their studio albums.

== Biography ==
=== Early years ===
Gould was born on April 24, 1963, in Los Angeles and is of Scottish and Hungarian descent on his father's side. He began playing bass while attending Loyola High School in Los Angeles with future Faith No More keyboardist Roddy Bottum. His first band during this time was named "The Animated," a genre-bending new wave group described as a cross between Buzzcocks, XTC, and Michael Jackson. The band also featured future Faith No More vocalist Chuck Mosley on keyboards and Mark Stewart (aka Stew) on guitar, later known for his work with The Negro Problem.

In the early 1980s, Gould moved to San Francisco to pursue his studies and became involved with several underground bands. During this period, he met drummer Mike Bordin and guitarist Jim Martin. Shortly thereafter, Gould formed a band with Bordin, keyboardist Wade Worthington (quickly replaced by Roddy Bottum), and guitarist/vocalist Mike "The Man" Morris named Faith No Man, which later became Faith No More after Morris left the group.

In the mid-1990s, Gould began working as a producer, and in 1997 he co-produced Faith No More's Album of the Year with former Swans drummer Roli Mosimann. Since then, he has become the CEO of Koolarrow Records and has worked on various projects as a producer or guest musician.

In February 2009, it was announced that Faith No More would reform for a tour and possibly new recordings.

In 2015, after their longest gap between albums, Faith No More released their seventh studio album, Sol Invictus.

=== Other collaborations ===
In the 1990s, Gould was part of the original line-up of the Los Angeles-based grindcore band Brujeria. He was also involved in several supergroups, including Shandi's Addiction (with Maynard Keenan, Brad Wilk, and Tom Morello) and Black Diamond Brigade (with Norwegian rock musicians Euroboy, Torgny Amdam, Tarjei Strøm, and Sigurd Wongraven). In addition, he performed with Wayne Kramer and Fear Factory, and produced CMX's Vainajala album. His guest appearances include recordings for the Romanian band Coma, as well as production work on Living Targets by the German group Beatsteaks, projects for Slovenia's Elvis Jackson, and the album 7 for the German rock band Harmful, with whom he also toured throughout 2007 as a guitarist.

In 2007, Gould joined the all-star band Fear and the Nervous System, formed by Korn guitarist James "Munky" Shaffer. The band also featured Bad Religion drummer Brooks Wackerman.

That same year, Gould became the bassist for Jello Biafra's new band, The Axis of Evildoers, alongside Ralph Spight (Victim's Family) on guitar and Jon Weiss on drums. They debuted at Jello Biafra's 50th birthday celebration on June 16 and 17, 2008, at the Great American Music Hall in San Francisco. The band was later renamed Jello Biafra and the Guantanamo School of Medicine, and their album Audacity of Hype was released on October 20, 2009.

In 2011, Gould released an experimental album titled The Talking Book, a collaboration with sound artist Jared Blum, known for his various projects on the Gigante Sound label. In 2012, he worked with Charles Hayward of This Heat and Mads Heldtberg on a project and release titled House of Hayduk. Also in 2011, Gould contributed to the production of the soundtrack for the documentary The Sequential Art, directed by Norwegian filmmaker Espen J. Jörgensen.

In 2013, Gould reunited with Espen J. Jörgensen to provide synth, edits, recomposing, and beats for a "groovy and experimental" EP titled Fugly.

In 2018, Gould joined Wayne Kramer's MC50 band, celebrating the 50th anniversary of the release of the MC5 album Kick Out The Jams. This line-up also featured Kim Thayil of Soundgarden, Brendan Canty of Fugazi, and Marcus Durant of Zen Guerilla.

=== Koolarrow records ===
Since 1999, Gould has operated the independent record label Koolarrow Records, which has specialized in international acts and unconventional artists such as Los Angeles' Flattbush, Seattle's Kultur Shock, Brujeria, Hog Molly (featuring Tad Doyle), Bosnia's Dubioza Kolektiv, San Francisco's La Plebe, the German rock band Harmful, Alexander Hacke (of Einstürzende Neubauten), Como Asesinar a Felipes from Chile, the former Danish experimental group Durefursog, and Mexican Dubwiser.

== Style ==
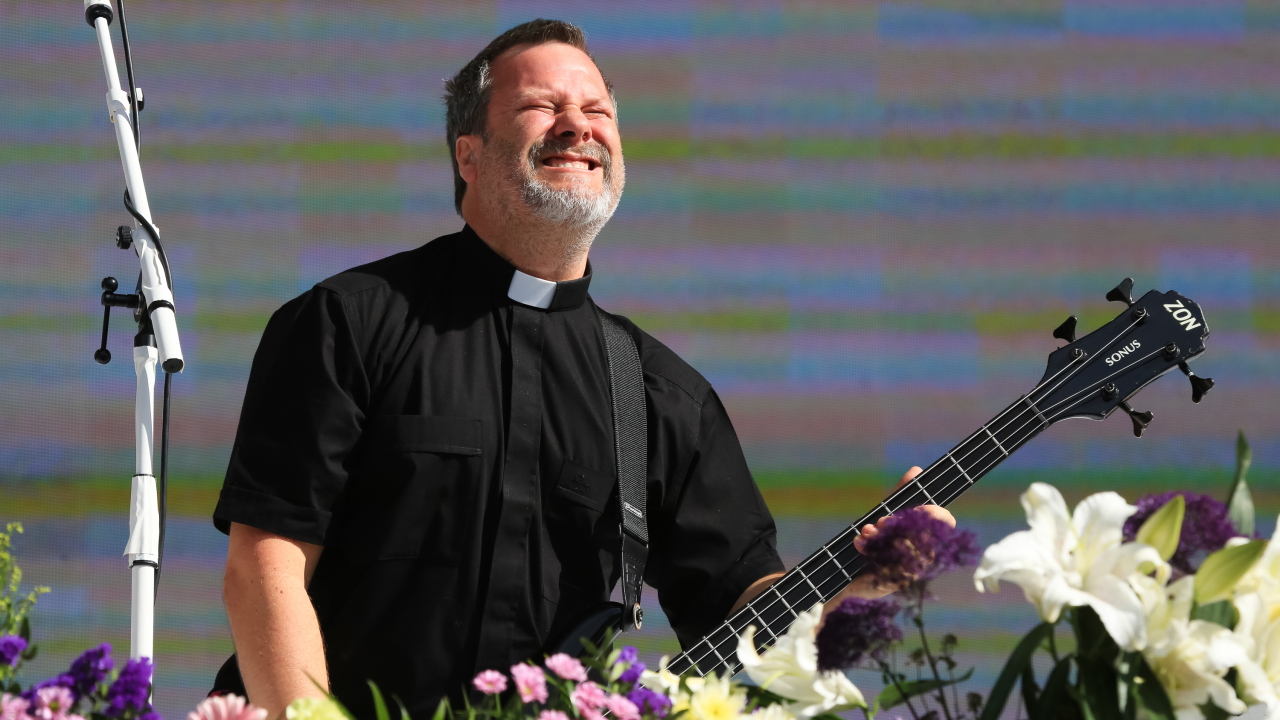
Gould performing with Faith No More in 2020

Gould is known for employing a wide variety of playing styles, alternating between using a plectrum, slapping, and fingerstyle. Fieldy from Korn has expressed admiration for Gould and his chemistry with his Faith No More bandmates. Kevin Feazey of The Fierce and the Dead has also spoken about Gould's influence on his bass playing.

== Discography ==
=== As a band member ===
Brujeria

- 1993: Matando Güeros
- 1995: Raza Odiada
- 2000: Brujerizmo

Fear and the Nervous System

- 2011: Fear and the Nervous System

Jello Biafra and the Guantanamo School of Medicine

- 2009: Audacity of Hype
- 2011: Enhanced Methods of Questioning (EP)

Harmful

- 2007: Seven

Bill Gould & Jared Blum

- 2011: The Talking Book
- 2020: Talking Book II
- 2023: The Eclipse

Bill Gould & Espen J. Jörgensen

- 2013: Fugly

=== As a featured musician ===
- 1994: Milk Cult – Burn or Bury, "Bow Kiness Static"
- 2005: Fear Factory – Transgression, "Echo of My Scream", "Supernova"
- 2006: Coma – Nerostitele, "Mai Presus De Cuvinte"
- 2006: Jeff Walker und Die Fluffers – Welcome to Carcass Cuntry
- 2012: Angertea – Nr. 4: Songs Exhaled, "No Computation"
- 2012: Mexican Dubwiser – Trouble in My Soul
- 2014: Mexican Dubwiser – Bad Behavior
- 2022: Corvus Corax – Era Metallum

=== Remixes ===
- 1995: "Engove" – instrumental remix of "Caffeine", originally by Faith No More. Appeared on Metallurgy, Vol. 1
- 1997: "Pristina (Billy Gould Mix)", appeared on "Last Cup of Sorrow" single
- 1998: "Du riechst so gut", originally by Rammstein. Faith No More remix

=== As a producer ===
- 1997: Naive – Post Alcoholic Anxieties
- 1997: Faith No More – Album of the Year (together with Roli Mosimann)
- 1998: CMX – Vainajala
- 1999: Think About Mutation – Highlife
- 2001: The Beatsteaks – Living Targets
- 2001: Kultur Shock – FUCC the INS
- 2007: Harmful – 7
- 2009: Elvis Jackson – Against the Gravity
- 2015: Faith No More – Sol Invictus

=== Other ===
- 1999 Spazz – Crush Kill Destroy (Mastering)
