= Album of the Year Tour =

1997–98 concert tour by Faith No More

- Tour by Faith No More
- Poster for the September 23, 1997 concert at the Agora Theater in Cleveland with Limp Bizkit
- Associated album: Album of the Year
- Start date: April 22, 1997
- End date: December 10, 1997 / April 7, 1998

Faith No More concert chronology
- King for a Day Tour (1995); Album of the Year Tour (1997); The Second Coming Tour (2009-2010)

The Album of the Year Tour was a concert tour by San Francisco band Faith No More, in support of their 1997 release Album of the Year. It was Faith No More's final tour before their original breakup in April 1998. Only 32 of the dates were in their native North America, due to the band's greater popularity overseas at the time.

== Background ==
The tour covered several continents, lasting from April 1997 to December 1997. During April 1998, the band reconvened for three festival dates in Spain and Portugal. These would end up being their last shows in over 10 years, as they announced their split later that month.

When Album of the Year was released in June 1997, Mike Bordin was called in to perform with Ozzy Osbourne for that year's edition of Ozzfest, which ran from May 24 to July 1. This resulted in Robin Guy (of the band Rachel Stamp) filling in on drums for Bordin during a UK Top of the Pops performance on May 30, as well as an absence of any Faith No More shows during the month of June. Shortly after he returned from Ozzfest, the band had to cancel four July dates in Europe, so Bordin could attend the birth of his first daughter in San Francisco.

The Album of the Year tour is notable for featuring Limp Bizkit, a nu metal/rap metal band greatly influenced by Faith No More, as an opener for several 1997 US dates. They were frequently booed by Faith No More's fans, including during a September 1997 concert at the Electric Factory in Philadelphia, where the crowd booed them off stage. In a 2013 interview, Roddy Bottum reflected on the shows with Limp Bizkit, recalling "I fought it at the time. I had to really push to get a couple bands that I liked to get on the bill in Portland and Seattle on that leg. I had no interest in the sound of Limp Bizkit. It was not how I wanted to be represented at all. Not to be snotty at all, but that guy Fred Durst had a really bad attitude. He was kind of a jerk." Bottum also remembered an incident where Durst "called the audience faggots at one show when they booed him." Durst apologized to him after this show, as he did not know that Bottum had come out as gay in the early 90s. Limp Bizkit's guitarist Wes Borland later claimed that his band were excited about the prospect of getting to tour with Faith No More, stating "the idea of it was cool [but] once we got there, it was a really tough crowd. They have a really tough crowd to please, who are very vocal about not liking you. We opened for Faith No More and Primus in the same year, and the Primus tour went a lot better than the Faith No More tour." Borland added that he did not get to know Mike Patton personally until several years later.

During the tour, they would cover various songs, both in full and as snippets, such as the Aqua song "Barbie Girl", "Highway Star" by Deep Purple, Will Smith's "Men in Black", Herb Alpert's "This Guy's in Love with You" and the R. Kelly songs "I Believe I Can Fly" and "Gotham City". An intro tape was used at the beginning of shows, which contained "Also sprach Zarathustra", followed by an Elvis-style fanfare clip announcing Faith No More as being from Caesars Palace, Las Vegas. The band's setlists for the tour mainly consisted of their 1990s material, with songs from Introduce Yourself and The Real Thing being played less frequently than before. However, the track "As the Worm Turns" (from 1985's We Care a Lot) began to appear more often this tour, having been mostly absent throughout the 1995 King for a Day... Fool for a Lifetime tour. All songs from Album of the Year were played during the tour, with the sole exception of "She Loves Me Not", which still remains one of the only studio album songs Faith No More has never performed live. The two b-sides "The Big Kahuna" and "Light Up & Let Go" were also not played, and have remained unperformed to this day. "Helpless" was only performed a single time on the tour, during the October 26, 1997 show at Festival Hall in Melbourne, Australia.

On the European legs, Faith No More performed in Croatia and Luxembourg, two countries they had never previously visited.

== Concert dates ==
=== Early European shows ===
Date	City	Country	Venue	Other Performers
April 22, 1997 (First show since September 1995, and first show with Jon Hudson)	London	England	Hippodrome	
April 28, 1997	Stockholm	Sweden	Electric Garden	
April 30, 1997	Amsterdam	Netherlands	Paradiso	Hanniball
May 3, 1997	Paris	France	Élysée Montmartre	Treponem Pal
May 4, 1997	Cologne	Germany	Bürgerhaus Stollwerck	
May 5, 1997	Berlin	Germany	SO 36	
May 6, 1997	Hamburg	Germany	Markthalle	Bad Sin
May 8, 1997	Paris	France	Nulle Part Ailleurs	
May 12, 1997	Glasgow	Scotland	Arches	
May 13, 1997	Nottingham	England	Rock City	
May 13, 1997	London	England	Astoria	A
May 16, 1997	London	England	TFI Friday	
May 30, 1997 (With Robin Guy of Rachel Stamp on drums)	London	England	BBC Top of the Pops	Spice Girls
Album of the Year is released around the world in June 1997

=== July '97 Florida shows ===
Date	City	Country	Venue	Other Performers
July 4, 1997	Tampa	United States	Pinellas County Fairgrounds (Note: This concert was part of WXTB 98. 7th Annual World's Largest Barbecue)	Our Lady Peace, Mighty Joe Plum, Sugartooth, Cool for August, Creed, Naked
July 5, 1997	Sunrise	United States	Markham Park (Note: This concert was part of Zetafest)	Better Than Ezra, The Nixons, Orbit

=== First European leg ===
Date	City	Country	Venue	Other Performers
~~July 10, 1997~~ (Cancelled due to the birth of Mike Bordin's daughter)	~~Naples~~	~~Italy~~	~~Open Air at the Sea~~	
~~July 11, 1997~~ (Cancelled due to the birth of Mike Bordin's daughter)	~~Venice~~	~~Italy~~	~~Beach Bum Rock Festival~~	
~~July 12, 1997~~ (Cancelled due to the birth of Mike Bordin's daughter)	~~Frauenfeld~~	~~Switzerland~~	~~Out in the Green Festival~~	
~~July 13, 1997~~ (Cancelled due to the birth of Mike Bordin's daughter)	~~Wels~~	~~Austria~~	~~Festival~~	
July 15, 1997	Katowice	Poland	Spodek Sporthall	Flapjack
July 17, 1997	Prague	Czech Republic	Sky Club Brumlovka	Satisfucktion
July 19, 1997	Zeebrugge	Belgium	Beach Rock Festival	Simple Minds, Wet Wet Wet, Neneh Cherry, Mark Owen, Shaggy
July 20, 1997	Stratford Upon Avon	England	Phoenix Festival	David Bowie, Billy Bragg, Catatonia, Apollo 440
July 23, 1997	Copenhagen	Denmark	Vega	
July 24, 1997	Oslo	Norway	Rockefeller	
July 26, 1997	Stockholm	Sweden	Lollipop Festival	
July 28, 1997	Helsinki	Finland	Kulttuuritalo	
~~August 14, 1997~~ (Cancelled)	~~Cunlhat~~	~~France~~	~~Free-Wheels Festival~~	
August 16, 1997	Cologne	Germany	Bizarre Festival	Silverchair, Fettes Brot, Marilyn Manson, Rollins Band, Bush, Skunk Anansie, Atari Teenage Riot, Catherine, Das Auge Gottes, Deine Lakaien, Descendents, Pist.On, Sans Secours
August 17, 1997	Budapest	Hungary	Pepsi-sziget fesztivál	Tankcsapda, New Model Army, Ladánybene 27
August 19, 1997	Haifa	Israel	City Hall	
August 20, 1997	Tel-Aviv	Israel	Cinerama	
August 22, 1997	Trutnov	Czech Republic	Trutnov Open Air Festival	
August 24, 1997	Dronten	Netherlands	Lowlands Festival	Foo Fighters, Life of Agony, Heideroosjes, Rowwen Hèze, Skunk Anansie, Rammstein, Blur, The Jon Spencer Blues Explosion, Pigmeat, Millencolin, Pennywise, I Against I
August 25, 1997	Luxembourg	Luxembourg	Den Atelier	
August 26, 1997	Utrecht	Netherlands	Tivoli	
August 27, 1997	Rotterdam	Netherlands	Night Town	
August 29, 1997	Strasbour	France	La Laiterie	
August 30, 1997	Konstanz	Germany	Rock Am See Festival	
August 31, 1997	Bologna	Italy	Arena Parco Nord	Eels

=== North American leg ===
Date	City	Country	Venue	Other Performers
September 5, 1997	Tinley Park, IL	United States	New World Music Theatre (Note: This concert was part of Rockstock)	Veruca Salt, Silverchair, Seven Mary Three, Megadeth, Local H, Limp Bizkit, Helmet, Gravity Kills, Days of the New, Cracker
September 7, 1997	Tulsa	United States	Mohawk Park (Note: This concert was part of KMYZ Edgefest)	Helmet, Sugar Ray, Reel Big Fish, Our Lady Peace, Smash Mouth, Caroline's Spine, Outhouse, Artificial Joy Club, Groove Pilots
September 9, 1997	St. Louis	United States	Mississippi Nights	Limp Bizkit
September 10, 1997	Columbus	United States	Newport Music Hall	Limp Bizkit
September 11, 1997	Cincinnati	United States	Bogart's	Limp Bizkit
September 12, 1997	Atlanta	United States	Masquerade	Limp Bizkit
September 13, 1997	Charlotte	United States	Blockbuster Pavilion (Note: This concert was part of 106.5 Weenie Roast)	Neil Young and Crazy Horse, Blues Traveler, Primus, Toad the Wet Sprocket, Soul Coughing
September 14, 1997	Virginia Beach	United States	Virginia Beach Amphitheater (Note: This concert was part of Lunatic Luau)	Seven Mary Three, The Nixons, Corrosion of Conformity, Jimmie's Chicken Shack
September 16, 1997	Washington	United States	9:30 Club	Limp Bizkit
September 17, 1997	Sea Bright	United States	The Tradewinds	Limp Bizkit
September 18, 1997	Providence	United States	Strand Theatre	Limp Bizkit
September 19, 1997	New York	United States	Roseland Ballroom	Limp Bizkit
September 20, 1997	Philadelphia	United States	Electric Factory	Limp Bizkit
September 21, 1997	Worcester	United States	Green Hill Park (Note: This concert was part of Locobazooka)	Limp Bizkit, Godsmack, Sector 98, Fjlex
September 22, 1997 (Rumored; not officially confirmed)	Rochester	United States	Waterstreet Music Hall	Limp Bizkit
September 23, 1997	Cleveland	United States	Agora Theatre	Limp Bizkit
September 24, 1997	Detroit	United States	St. Andrews Hall	Limp Bizkit
September 25, 1997	Milwaukee	United States	Modjeska Theatre	Limp Bizkit
September 26, 1997	Bonner Springs	United States	Sandstone Amphitheatre (Note: This concert was part of Summer Slam)	Pantera, Machine Head, Limp Bizkit, Coal Chamber
September 27, 1997	Dallas	United States	Deep Ellum Live	Limp Bizkit
September 28, 1997	New Orleans	United States	Marconi Meadows (Note: This concert was part of The End’s Mojo Music Festival)	Foo Fighters, Fiona Apple, Better Than Ezra, Candlebox, Cowboy Mouth, Limp Bizkit, Reel Big Fish
October 1, 1997	Denver	United States	Odgen Theatre	Limp Bizkit
October 2, 1997	Salt Lake City	United States	Brick's	Limp Bizkit
October 3, 1997	Las Vegas	United States	Huntridge Theatre	Limp Bizkit
October 4, 1997	Phoenix	United States	Celebrity Theater	Limp Bizkit, Grey Daze
October 5, 1997	Los Angeles	United States	Palace	Limp Bizkit
October 6, 1997	San Francisco	United States	The Warfield	lowercase
October 8, 1997	Portland	United States	La Luna	lowercase
October 10, 1997	Vancouver	Canada	Rage	lowercase
October 11, 1997	Seattle	United States	Moore Theatre	

=== Australia/New Zealand leg ===
Date	City	Country	Venue	Other Performers
October 16, 1997	Wellington	New Zealand	Queens Wharf	
October 17, 1997	Auckland	New Zealand	North Shore Events Centre	Go Ask Alice
October 20, 1997	Sydney	Australia	Hordern Pavilion	Shihad
October 21, 1997	Sydney	Australia	Hordern Pavilion	Shihad
October 23, 1997	Newcastle	Australia	Workers Club	
October 24, 1997	Brisbane	Australia	Brisbane Entertainment Centre	
October 26, 1997	Melbourne	Australia	Festival Hall	Shihad
October 27, 1997	Melbourne	Australia	Festival Hall	Shihad
October 29, 1997	Adelaide	Australia	Adelaide Entertainment Centre	
November 1, 1997	Perth	Australia	Perth Entertainment Centre	Shihad

=== Japanese leg ===
Date	City	Country	Venue	Other Performers
November 5, 1997	Nagoya	Japan	Club Quattro	
November 6, 1997	Osaka	Japan	Sinsaibashi	
November 7, 1997	Tokyo	Japan	Shibuya On Air East	
November 8, 1997	Tokyo	Japan	Shibuya On Air East	

=== Second European leg ===
Date	City	Country	Venue	Other Performers
November 11, 1997	Hamburg	Germany	Grosse Freiheit	
November 12, 1997	Berlin	Germany	Huxley's Neue Welt	
November 13, 1997	Ludwigsburg	Germany	Forum Am Schlosspark	
November 14, 1997	Sursee	Germany	Stadthalle	
November 15, 1997	Geneva	Switzerland	Vernier sur Rock	
November 17, 1997	Munich	Germany	Colosseum	Radish
November 18, 1997	Vienna	Austria	Libro Music Hall	
November 19, 1997	Ljubljana	Slovenia	Hala Tivoli	Odpisani, Psycho-Path
November 20, 1997	Zagreb	Croatia	Dom Sportova	
November 21, 1997	Milan	Italy	Palalido	Radish
November 23, 1997	Moscow	Russia	Lushniki	Tequilajazzz, Green Gray, Naive
November 25, 1997	Offenbach am Main	Germany	Stadthalle Offenbach	Eskimos and Egypt, Radish
November 26, 1997	Düsseldorf	Germany	Stahlwerk	
November 27, 1997	Hannover	Germany	Music Hall	Eskimos and Egypt, Radish
November 29, 1997	London	England	Brixton Academy	Radish
November 30, 1997	Cambridge	England	Corn Exchange	
December 1, 1997	Wolverhampton	England	Civic Hall	
December 3, 1997	Manchester	England	Manchester Academy	Radish
December 4, 1997	Nottingham	England	Rock City	Radish
December 5, 1997	London	England	TFI Friday	
December 5, 1997	Glasgow	Scotland	Barrowlands	
December 6, 1997	Innsbruck	Austria	MTV Air & Style Event	
December 8, 1997	Lyon	France	Transbordeur	
December 9, 1997	Paris	France	Canal + Studios	
December 9, 1997	Paris	France	Le Bataclan	Radish
December 10, 1997	Lille	France	L'Aéronef	Radish

=== Late European shows ===
Date	City	Country	Venue	Other Performers
April 4, 1998	Granada	Spain	Festival Esparrago Rock	
April 6, 1998	Oporto	Portugal	Coliseu do Porto	
April 7, 1998	Lisbon	Portugal	Coliseu dos Recreios	
Faith No More officially announce their breakup on April 20, 1998
~~July 1, 1998~~ (Cancelled due to breakup)	~~Kristiansand~~	~~Norway~~	~~Quart Festival~~	
~~July, 1998~~ (Cancelled due to breakup)	~~Ringe~~	~~Denmark~~	~~Midtfyns Festival~~	
~~July 9, 1998~~ (Cancelled due to breakup)	~~Cologne~~	~~Germany~~	~~Sporthalle~~	~~Aerosmith~~

== Songs performed ==
=== Studio songs ===
We Care a Lot

- "We Care a Lot"
- "As the Worm Turns"

Introduce Yourself

- "Introduce Yourself"
- "Chinese Arithmetic"
- "Death March"

The Real Thing

- "From Out of Nowhere"
- "Epic"
- "Surprise! You're Dead!"

Angel Dust

- "Land of Sunshine"
- "Caffeine"
- "Midlife Crisis"
- "Be Aggressive"
- "Midnight Cowboy" (John Barry)
- "Easy" (Commodores)

King for a Day... Fool for a Lifetime

- "Get Out"
- "Ricochet" (performed only once live)
- "Evidence"
- "The Gentle Art of Making Enemies"
- "Ugly in the Morning"
- "Digging the Grave"
- "Take This Bottle"
- "King for a Day"
- "What a Day"
- "Just a Man"
- "I Started a Joke" (Bee Gees)

Album of the Year

- "Collision"
- "Stripsearch"
- "Last Cup of Sorrow"
- "Naked in Front of the Computer"
- "Helpless" (performed only once live)
- "Mouth to Mouth"
- "Ashes to Ashes"
- "Got That Feeling"
- "Paths of Glory"
- "Home Sick Home"
- "Pristina"

=== Cover songs ===
- "Ain't Talkin' 'bout Dub" (Apollo 440)
- "Barbie Girl" (Aqua)
- "Gotham City" (R. Kelly)
- "I Believe I Can Fly" (R. Kelly)
- "I Want to Know What Love Is" (Foreigner)
- "Need You Tonight" (INXS)
- "Highway Star" (Deep Purple)
- "This Guy's in Love With You" (Burt Bacharach / Herb Alpert)
- "This Town Ain't Big Enough for Both of Us" (Sparks)
