= The Works (Faith No More album) =

Compilation album by Faith No More
- Released: March 31, 2008
- Recorded: 1986–1997
- Genre: Alternative metal, alternative rock, experimental rock, funk metal
- Length: 190:00 approx.
- Label: Rhino

Faith No More chronology
Double Feature: Live at the Brixton Academy, London (You Fat Bastards) / Who Cares a Lot? The Greatest Videos (2006)	The Works (2008)	The Very Best Definitive Ultimate Greatest Hits Collection (2009)

The Works is a 3-disc compilation of Faith No More songs ranging from their second album Introduce Yourself to their sixth album Album of the Year. Virtually every song from The Real Thing is represented, as well as every song from the 1992 album Angel Dust, and every song from the CD release of Live at the Brixton Academy, which had not been officially released in the US until this point. It also includes the soundtrack contribution "The Perfect Crime" and "Easy" which had only been included on non-US pressings of Angel Dust. This compilation does not, however contain many rarities and is not presented in chronological order and as such is viewed as disappointing by many fans.

== Track listing ==
*Disc one
No.	Title	From the album	Length
1.	"Introduce Yourself"	Introduce Yourself	1:30
2.	"Anne's Song"	Introduce Yourself	4:46
3.	"Chinese Arithmetic"	Introduce Yourself	4:39
4.	"We Care a Lot"	Introduce Yourself	4:01
5.	"From Out of Nowhere"	The Real Thing	3:21
6.	"Epic"	The Real Thing	4:52
7.	"Falling to Pieces"	The Real Thing	5:13
8.	"Underwater"	The Real Thing	3:49
9.	"Zombie Eaters"	The Real Thing	5:59
10.	"The Morning After"	The Real Thing	3:42
11.	"Faster Disco"	Introduce Yourself	4:18
12.	"Crack Hitler"	Angel Dust	4:40
13.	"Caffeine"	Angel Dust	4:29
14.	"Malpractice"	Angel Dust	4:03
15.	"Surprise! You're Dead!"	The Real Thing	2:27

*Disc two
No.	Title	From the album	Length
1.	"A Small Victory"	Angel Dust	4:56
2.	"Be Aggressive"	Angel Dust	3:41
3.	"Everything's Ruined"	Angel Dust	4:33
4.	"Midlife Crisis"	Angel Dust	4:20
5.	"Kindergarten"	Angel Dust	4:30
6.	"Land of Sunshine"	Angel Dust	3:43
7.	"Smaller & Smaller"	Angel Dust	5:08
8.	"Jizzlobber"	Angel Dust	6:38
9.	"Digging the Grave"	King for a Day...	3:03
10.	"Star A.D."	King for a Day...	3:21
11.	"Ricochet"	King for a Day...	4:27
12.	"Evidence"	King for a Day...	4:52
13.	"Ashes to Ashes"	Album of the Year	3:35
14.	"Last Cup of Sorrow"	Album of the Year	4:10
15.	"She Loves Me Not"	Album of the Year	3:28

*Disc three
No.	Title	From the album	Length
1.	"War Pigs"	Live at the Brixton Academy	6:58
2.	"Midnight Cowboy"	Angel Dust	4:14
3.	"The Perfect Crime"	Bill & Ted's Bogus Journey	4:25
4.	"The Grade"	Live at the Brixton Academy^{[A]}	2:03
5.	"The Real Thing"	Live at the Brixton Academy	7:54
6.	"We Care a Lot"	Live at the Brixton Academy	3:05
7.	"Edge of the World"	Live at the Brixton Academy	5:47
8.	"The Cowboy Song"	Live at the Brixton Academy^{[A]}	5:12
9.	"Falling to Pieces"	Live at the Brixton Academy	4:45
10.	"Woodpecker from Mars"	The Real Thing	5:41
11.	"RV"	Angel Dust	3:43
12.	"As the Worm Turns"	Live at the Brixton Academy	2:35
13.	"I Started a Joke"	Who Cares A Lot	3:00
14.	"Easy"	Angel Dust	3:08

== Footnotes ==
1. ^{^} ^{a} ^{b} Outtakes from The Real Thing sessions, released on the Live at the Brixton Academy album.
