= The Very Best Definitive Ultimate Greatest Hits Collection =

Compilation album by Faith No More
- Released: June 8, 2009
- Recorded: 1986–1997
- Genres: Alternative metal; experimental rock; alternative rock
- Label: Rhino
- Producer: Various

Faith No More chronology
The Works (2008)	The Very Best Definitive Ultimate Greatest Hits Collection (2009)	MidLife Crisis: The Very Best of Faith No More (2010)

Professional ratings
Review scores
Source	Rating
AllMusic	3/5 stars
MusicOMH	2.5/5 stars
Record Collector	4/5 stars

The Very Best Definitive Ultimate Greatest Hits Collection is a two-disc compilation album by American band Faith No More. It was released on June 1, 2009, in the UK to coincide with the band's reunion tour. This double disc set contains the band's greatest hits on the first CD, while the second CD features B-sides and rarities.

== Track listing ==
Disc 1
No.	Title	From the album	Length
1.	"The Real Thing"	The Real Thing	8:13
2.	"From Out of Nowhere"	The Real Thing	3:22
3.	"Epic"	The Real Thing	4:54
4.	"We Care a Lot"	Introduce Yourself	4:04
5.	"R'n'R"	Introduce Yourself	3:14
6.	"Kindergarten"	Angel Dust	4:30
7.	"Caffeine"	Angel Dust	4:29
8.	"Land of Sunshine"	Angel Dust	3:44
9.	"Be Aggressive"	Angel Dust	3:43
10.	"Midlife Crisis"	Angel Dust	4:22
11.	"A Small Victory"	Angel Dust	4:56
12.	"Everything's Ruined"	Angel Dust	4:35
13.	"Evidence"	King for a Day... Fool for a Lifetime	4:55
14.	"Digging the Grave"	King for a Day... Fool for a Lifetime	3:06
15.	"Ricochet"	King for a Day... Fool for a Lifetime	4:31
16.	"Ashes to Ashes"	Album of the Year	3:38
17.	"Stripsearch"	Album of the Year	4:31
18.	"Easy"	Angel Dust	3:08

Disc 2
No.	Title	Length
1.	"Absolute Zero" ("Digging the Grave" B-side and King for a Day Japanese bonus track)	4:07
2.	"The Big Kahuna" ("Ashes to Ashes" B-side and Album of the Year Japanese bonus track)	3:05
3.	"Light Up and Let Go" ("Ashes to Ashes" B-side Album of the Year Japanese bonus track)	2:20
4.	"I Won't Forget You" (King for a Day... Fool for a Lifetime outtake, previously released on Who Cares a Lot? The Greatest Hits greatest hits album 1998)	4:10
5.	"The World Is Yours" (Angel Dust outtake, previously released on Who Cares a Lot? The Greatest Hits compilation album 1998)	5:53
6.	"Hippie Jam Song" (King for a Day... Fool for a Lifetime outtake, previously released on Who Cares a Lot? The Greatest Hits compilation album 1998)	4:58
7.	"Sweet Emotion" (Longer version of a demo given away with Kerrang! magazine in 1989; outtake from The Real Thing sessions. Later reworked as "The Perfect Crime" for Bill & Ted's Bogus Journey and included on This Is It and The Works)	4:53
8.	"New Improved Song" (Released on a 7-inch EP free with Sounds magazine in 1988; outtake from the Introduce Yourself sessions. The song "The Morning After" from The Real Thing shares the same chord progression and bassline, but is largely a different song.)	3:51
9.	"Das Schutzenfest" (Released on Songs to Make Love To EP, 1992)	2:58
10.	"This Guy's in Love with You" (Released on Who Cares a Lot? The Greatest Hits compilation album, 1998) (Live in Sydney October 21, 1997)	4:22

Digital bonus tracks
No.	Title	Length
19.	"Spanish Eyes" ("Ricochet" B-side and King for a Day bonus track)	3:00
20.	"I Started a Joke" ("Digging the Grave" B-side and King for a Day bonus track)	3:02

== Charts ==
Chart (2009)	Peak position
Finnish Albums Chart	6

== Certifications ==
Region	Certification	Certified units/sales
New Zealand (RMNZ)	Gold	7,500^{‡}
^{‡} Sales+streaming figures based on certification alone.
