= Who Cares a Lot? The Greatest Hits =

- Who Cares a Lot? The Greatest Hits British and European cover art.

Greatest hits album by Faith No More
- Released: November 24, 1998
- Recorded: 1986–1997
- Genres: Alternative metal, experimental rock, alternative rock, funk metal, avant-garde
- Length: 86:11
- Labels: Slash; Reprise; London
- Producers: Matt Wallace, Steve Berlin, Andy Wallace, Roli Mosimann, Billy Gould, Faith No More

Faith No More chronology
Album of the Year (1997)	Who Cares a Lot? The Greatest Hits (1998)	Who Cares a Lot? The Greatest Videos (1999)

Alternative cover
- Who Cares a Lot? The Greatest Hits North American cover art.

Professional ratings
Review scores
Source	Rating
AllMusic	3/5 stars

Who Cares a Lot? The Greatest Hits is a greatest hits retrospective compilation album by American rock band Faith No More. It was released on compact disc and compact cassette by Slash Records and London Records in Britain and Europe on November 24, 1998, and by Slash Records and Reprise Records in North America on December 8, 1998. On January 8, 2021, Slash Records and Rhino Records re-issued the compilation on phonograph record.

Issued following the band's April 1998 breakup, a companion video album was also released on video home system under the title Who Cares a Lot? The Greatest Videos by Slash Records and London Records via Polygram Video in Britain and Europe, and Slash Records and Reprise Records via Warner Reprise Video in North America on February 23, 1999. The album was most commercially successful in Australia, reaching number 4 on the country's charts and being certified Platinum. It also charted in New Zealand and several European countries, but failed to chart on the Billboard 200 in the United States.

The album's content spans most of the band's career (at the time of its initial break-up in 1998), including songs from all of the band's studio albums released through Slash Records (1987–1997). The first disc collects 15 singles from the band's Slash Records career in chronological order. It features the most recognized hits and promos. The second disc has a handful of unreleased songs, B-sides, demos, and live recordings. Some of the notable previously unreleased material includes "The World Is Yours" and "I Won't Forget You".

== Production ==
Unlike later Faith No More compilations released through Slash/Warner, the band were involved with this release. Regarding the track selection, bassist Billy Gould remarked in a September 1998 interview

The way tracks got selected originally was, after we got broke up I got word that the record company was making a retrospective of Faith No More, and obviously that would probably be the singles and the better known songs. And I thought about it, and I was thinking 'I wonder what they're going to do', made a couple of calls to the manager, and [was] like 'do you know exactly how they're going to do this and what they're going to do', and he said 'well you know, I'll put you in touch with them and maybe you should get involved'. And I thought that would be a good idea, because I wanted just to make sure that it was done in a way that we would approve of. I wanted to make the songs chronological for one thing, because I think that through our career our music has changed a lot. The other thing is I wanted to make sure that we had something that was a little bit interesting, maybe stuff that people hadn't heard before, because I had some tapes at my house in the basement that nobody had heard, and I thought they sounded good enough to release.

In this interview, Gould additionally said that due to the band's variety of styles, there could be genre-themed compilation for Faith No More, such a metal compilation, a pop compilation or a soul compilation. However, he noted that this would be logistically difficult to do since it would require releasing multiple albums.

== Track listing ==
Disc one
No.	Title	Original album	Length
1.	"We Care a Lot" (original version^{[A]})	Introduce Yourself (1987)	4:03
2.	"Introduce Yourself"	Introduce Yourself	1:33
3.	"From Out of Nowhere"	The Real Thing (1989)	3:21
4.	"Epic"	The Real Thing	4:53
5.	"Falling to Pieces"	The Real Thing	5:12
6.	"Midlife Crisis"	Angel Dust (1992)	4:17
7.	"A Small Victory"	Angel Dust	4:56
8.	"Easy"	A-side single (1992), Angel Dust (1993 re-issue)	3:07
9.	"Digging the Grave"	King for a Day... Fool for a Lifetime (1995)	3:04
10.	"The Gentle Art of Making Enemies"	King for a Day... Fool for a Lifetime	3:29
11.	"Evidence"	King for a Day... Fool for a Lifetime	4:54
12.	"I Started a Joke"	B-side of "Digging the Grave" single, King for a Day... Fool for a Lifetime (Brazil version)	3:00
13.	"Last Cup of Sorrow"	Album of the Year (1997)	4:09
14.	"Ashes to Ashes"	Album of the Year	3:36
15.	"Stripsearch"	Album of the Year	4:29

Disc two
No.	Title	Writer(s)	Length
1.	"The World Is Yours" (recorded during the Angel Dust sessions)	Faith No More	5:52
2.	"Hippie Jam Song" (recorded during the King for a Day... Fool for a Lifetime sessions)	Gould, Patton	4:58
3.	"Instrumental" (recorded after King for a Day... Fool for a Lifetime. Roddy plays all guitars on this track)	Bottum, Gould, Patton	4:59
4.	"I Won't Forget You" (recorded during the King for a Day... Fool for a Lifetime sessions)	Gould, Patton	4:09
5.	"Introduce Yourself" (4-track demos)	Faith No More	1:43
6.	"Highway Star" (live^{[B]})	Lord, Blackmore, Gillan, Paice, Glover	1:07
7.	"Theme from Midnight Cowboy" (live^{[C]})	Barry	1:03
8.	"This Guy's in Love with You" (live^{[C]})	Bacharach, David	4:19

== Charts ==
=== Weekly charts ===
Chart (1998)	Peak position
Australian Albums (ARIA)	4
Austrian Albums (Ö3 Austria)	46
German Albums (Offizielle Top 100)	27
New Zealand Albums (RMNZ)	10
Norwegian Albums (VG-lista)	26
Scottish Albums (Official Charts)	45
UK Albums (Official Charts)	37
UK Rock & Metal Albums (Official Charts)	1

Chart (2021)	Peak position
Hungarian Albums (MAHASZ)	11

=== Year-end charts ===
Chart (1998)	Position
Australian Albums (ARIA)	68

== Certifications ==
Region	Certification	Certified units/sales
Australia (ARIA)	Platinum	70,000^{^}
^{^} Shipments figures based on certification alone.

== Release history ==
There were three different versions that were put out for this compilation. Between the versions, the title and covers were altered.

The album art for the American release was the red question mark on black background, while the United Kingdom, European, Argentine, and Oceanian releases featured the Benny Hill art. The Oceanian double disc edition also had a "Limited Edition 2CD Set" sticker, as in other markets the bonus disc was not limited. In Europe, only a single disc edition was released. For this, the first five tracks off the second disc were simply added to the end of the compilation.

Region	Title	Notes	Release date	Discs (tracks)	Label
Germany	Who Cared a Lot	Original promo	1998/11/02	(16) CD	Slash/London
Europe	Who Cares a Lot? The Greatest Hits		1998/11/24	(20) CD/Tape	WEA/Slash/London
Germany	Who Cares a Lot? The Greatest Hits		1998/11/06	(15) CD	Universal
Japan	We Cared a Lot? The Greatest Hits		1998/11/30	(15) CD	Universal International
North America	Who Cares a Lot? Greatest Hits		1998/12/08	(15+8) 2×CD	WEA/Reprise
Oceania	Who Cares a Lot? The Greatest Hits	First pressing. Limited edition	-	(15+8) 2×CD	WEA/Slash/London
Oceania	Who Cares a Lot? The Greatest Hits	Second pressing. Reissue	-	(20) CD	WEA/Slash/London
United Kingdom	Who Cares a Lot? The Greatest Hits		1998/10/12	(15+8) 2×CD	WEA/Slash/London
United Kingdom	Who Cares a Lot? The Greatest Hits	Reissue	1999/10/04	(15) CD	WEA/Slash/London

=== Promo ===
The album was originally titled Who Cared a Lot?. It had a different track listing and cover artwork, but only saw release as a promo.

Original promo track listing
No.	Title	Length
1.	"Introduce Yourself"	1:33
2.	"We Care a Lot"	4:03
3.	"Digging the Grave"	3:04
4.	"The Gentle Art of Making Enemies"	3:29
5.	"Epic"	4:53
6.	"Falling to Pieces"	5:12
7.	"Edge of the World"	4:10
8.	"Midlife Crisis"	5:12
9.	"Easy"	3:07
10.	"A Small Victory"	4:56
11.	"Evidence"	4:54
12.	"Last Cup of Sorrow"	4:09
13.	"Stripsearch"	4:29
14.	"Ashes to Ashes"	3:36
15.	"From out of Nowhere"	3:21
16.	"I Started a Joke"	3:00

== Footnotes ==
1. All releases of this compilation contain the Slash Records version of "We Care a Lot" found on 1987's Introduce Yourself, rather than the one from the band's earlier independent 1985 album We Care a Lot. The album sleeves that describe the track as "Original Version" are therefore misleading, but originate from Slash Records later releasing a live version of "We Care a Lot" from Live at the Brixton Academy as a single in 1991.
2. Live on October 6, 1997, at San Francisco
3. ^{^} ^{a} ^{b} Live on October 21, 1997, at the Horden Pavilion, Sydney, Australia recorded by MTV Australia
