= King for a Day... Fool for a Lifetime =

Studio album by Faith No More
- Released: March 13, 1995
- Recorded: 1994
- Studio: Bearsville (Bearsville, New York)
- Genres: Alternative metal; alternative rock
- Length: 56:33
- Labels: Slash; Reprise
- Producers: Andy Wallace; Faith No More

Faith No More chronology
Angel Dust (1992)	King for a Day... Fool for a Lifetime (1995)	Album of the Year (1997)

Singles from King for a Day... Fool for a Lifetime
- 1. "Digging the Grave" Released: February 28, 1995; 2. "Ricochet" Released: May 1, 1995; 3. "Evidence" Released: May 8, 1995

King for a Day... Fool for a Lifetime is the fifth studio album by American rock band Faith No More, released on March 13, 1995, by Slash and Reprise Records. It was their first album recorded without longtime guitarist Jim Martin. The album showcased a variety of musical genres, with Rolling Stone calling the result a "genre shuffle". King for a Day... Fool for a Lifetime spawned three singles: "Digging the Grave", "Ricochet" and "Evidence".

Following Martin's departure, Trey Spruance was brought on to perform on the album; he had also been in Mr. Bungle with singer Mike Patton. Production of the album was further marred by the band suffering a car accident, and the absence of keyboard player Roddy Bottum, who was affected by the deaths of both his father and Kurt Cobain; Courtney Love, Cobain's wife and a former Faith No More vocalist, remains his close friend. Spruance was replaced on the supporting tour by the band's former roadie Dean Menta; however, Spruance played live with Faith No More for the first time in November 2011, playing the entire album during a show in Chile, and officially rejoined the band in 2026.

Critical reception to the album has been mixed, with its varied genres being cited as a detraction by several reviewers. Retrospectively, critique has been more positive and the record has subsequently appeared on several publications' "best of" lists. The album earned the band two Bay Area Music award nominations. The album charted across Europe and Australasia, and peaked at number 31 in the United States.

== Production ==
=== Background ===
After releasing Angel Dust in 1992, Faith No More's next project was a collaboration with Boo-Yaa T.R.I.B.E., contributing the single "Another Body Murdered" to the soundtrack for the 1993 film Judgment Night. This would be the first professional recording the band released without guitarist Jim Martin, with bassist Billy Gould recording the guitar parts instead. Martin skipped practice sessions with the band during the Angel Dust recording sessions, and also reportedly stopped writing new music at this time. He had grown dissatisfied with their new musical direction on the album, which he often referred to as "gay disco". Around the time "Another Body Murdered" was released, the band had to cancel a planned run of shows in Peru, Brazil and Venezuela, as a result of the issues they were experiencing with Martin.

Martin was fired from the band later in 1993 due to musical differences, via a fax from keyboard player Roddy Bottum. He subsequently released a solo metal album in 1997 titled Milk and Blood. This was in addition to performing on Flybanger's 2001 album Headtrip to Nowhere; the album was produced by Matt Wallace, who had handled all of Faith No More's albums up to Angel Dust. Mr. Bungle guitarist Trey Spruance was brought in to replace Martin and record for Faith No More's follow up to Angel Dust. However, Spruance left the band before the subsequent tour, and was replaced by the band's keyboard roadie, Dean Menta. Reasons given for the change differ—the band claim Spruance was unwilling to commit to a long touring schedule in support of the album, whilst Spruance claims he was never meant to be a permanent member in the first place. In one magazine interview, Gould labelled Spruance as a "spoilt rich kid" who did not want to tour. However, Spruance recalled not even having enough money to buy the magazine where Gould said this about him. He remembered, "this is like one of those stunning juxtapositions in life when you're standing in fucking Tower Records and this thing goes out to the whole world that you're this spoilt, privileged rich kid, and you can't even buy the fucking magazine it's written in. That was really almost like a cosmic moment."

Roddy Bottum claims to have been mostly absent during this period, owing to the deaths of his father and Kurt Cobain, whose wife Courtney Love was a close friend of his and one of the temporary lead singers of the band before Chuck Mosley joined. In addition to this, Bottum had developed a heroin addiction. At one point, his addiction caused a band intervention, following the filming of the video for "Another Body Murdered". Bottum's absence led to the album being written largely without keyboards. Around the recording of the album in 1994, Mike Patton also married Cristina Zuccatosta, an Italian.

=== Writing and recording ===
King for a Day... Fool for a Lifetime was recorded in Bearsville Studios, in Bearsville, New York, making it the first and only Faith No More album not to be recorded in their native California. Gould has described the remote location of the studio as a form of "sensory deprivation". Writing and rehearsing the songs for the album took eight to nine months, although half of this time was spent finding a replacement for Martin. Recording the album took an additional three months, for which the band hired producer Andy Wallace. Wallace had previously worked with Sonic Youth, Nirvana and Slayer, and despite his surname, bore no relation to their previous producer Matt Wallace. Bottum claimed the combination of Wallace and Spruance as two new influences helped to create "a real up-in-the-air, what the fuck is gonna happen kind of feel" while recording. In a 1995 Australian radio interview, drummer Mike Bordin said that the record was more focused than Angel Dust, and that the departure of previous guitarist Jim Martin made the writing process easier. Gould said at the time, "we've never written stuff with Jim, as a band. Usually we'd give him a tape and he'd put stuff to it because he didn't like practicing with us much." Gould added in another interview, "it's heavier, it's more direct and it's the first record where we had the guitar the way we wanted it. Now it feels we're a dog who's been let off the leash."

According to singer Mike Patton, the band were involved in a car accident during the recording sessions for the album, while Patton was driving. Spruance and drummer Mike Bordin were also involved, and Patton claimed to have "had to look at a lot of things in the face" as a result. The band used art from the graphic novel Flood by Eric Drooker for the album's cover and those of its singles.

== Music ==
=== Style ===
It is considered to be one of their most diverse releases. On King for a Day... Fool for a Lifetime the band focused on writing songs in different genres, rather than incorporating multiple genres into single songs, like they had done with many of the tracks on Angel Dust. Uproxx stated in 2015 that it saw the band "trying out just about any genre they saw fit." In their review of the 2016 deluxe edition of the album, PopMatters reflected that, "King for a Day has Faith No More pushing further in all directions. It's heavier, it's softer, it's even more varied in genre experimentation, and it's longer." The album includes elements of genres such as heavy metal, punk, big band music, blue-eyed soul, bossa nova, cocktail music, country, death metal, gospel, grindcore, gothic metal, funk, lounge music, Japanese noise music, jazz, power pop, salsa, swing music, thrash metal and western music. In a 1995 interview with Metal Hammer, Mike Bordin discussed the change in songwriting approach from previous releases, saying that "Instead of putting everything into every song, we wanted to take things out and make them a bit simpler." Bordin also said he was pleased with how both the heavy songs and the lighter songs turned out, saying "the smoother songs I've never felt we've gotten exactly right. And this one is pretty damn close to being exactly right." Regarding their stylistic direction on the album, Mike Patton remarked to Meat magazine in 1995 that, "we didn't really have any concept or idea. We don't know what it is we do, we just know how to do it." In another interview from April 1995, he noted that the album was just "us being us".

=== Singles ===
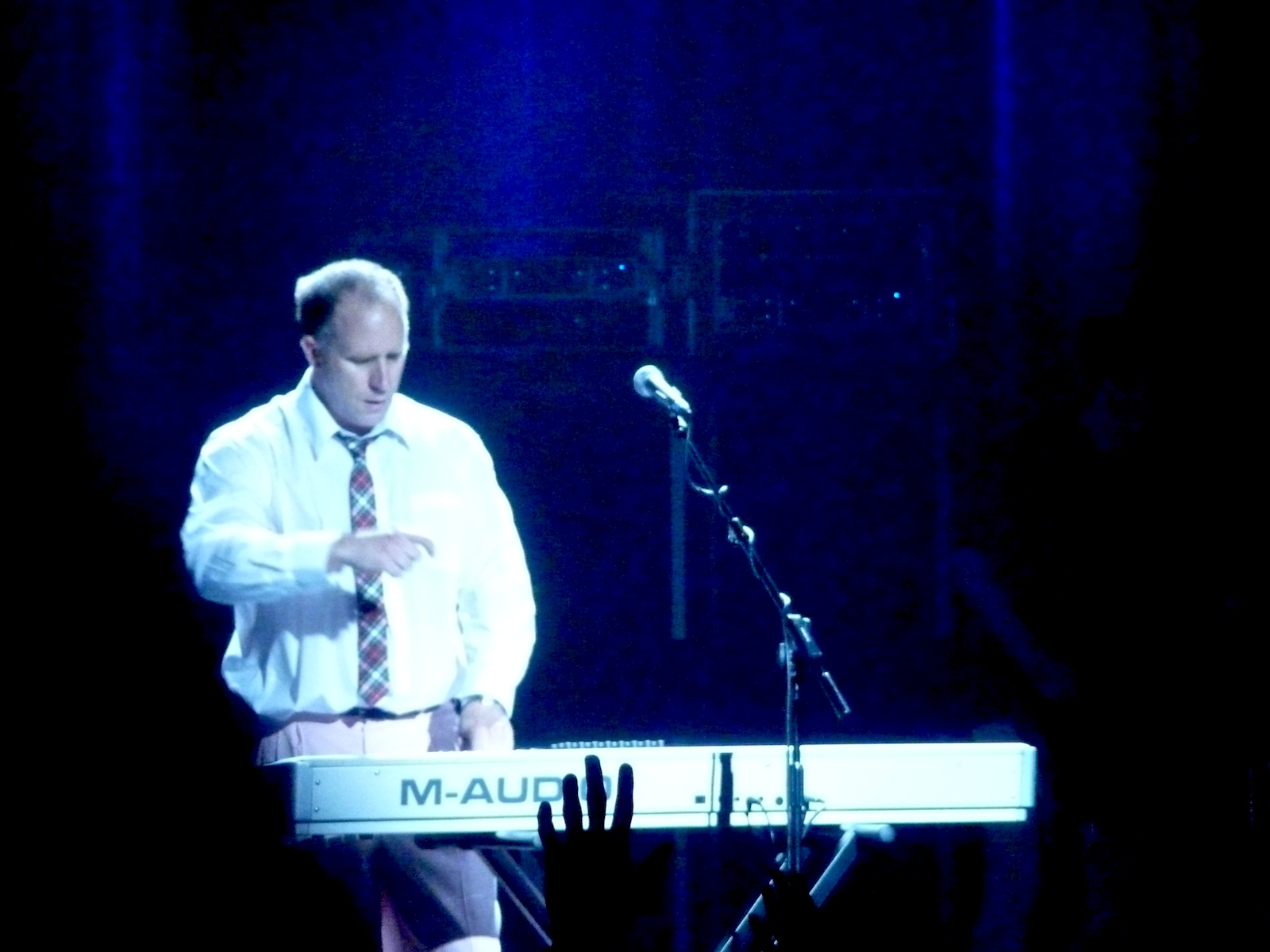
Keyboard player Roddy Bottum (pictured in 2009) was absent for much of the album's recording.

Before the album's release, the song "Digging the Grave" was released as a single on February 28, 1995. It was chosen ahead of several more pop-friendly tracks on the album. Gould said in 1995, "radio will say our song 'Digging the Grave' is too hard for them, too metal. [But] if we do a song like 'Evidence', then none of the metal stations will want it." That March, the band appeared on the British television program Top of the Pops to promote the single, later performing it on MTV Europe, Canal+'s Nulle Part Ailleurs and The Jon Stewart Show. The single reached number 16 on the UK Singles Chart, and number 12 on the Australian ARIA Charts. It featured on an episode of Beavis and Butt-head in August 1995, and was included on the soundtrack of the 1996 Italian film Jack Frusciante è uscito dal gruppo. A video for the song was recorded, directed by Marcus Raboy, and filmed in San Francisco. and was later included on the collection Who Cares a Lot? The Greatest Videos.

"Ricochet" was released as the album's second single on May 1, 1995; and was promoted with an appearance on Late Night with Conan O'Brien. In April 1995, Billboard described the song's sound as "grungy hard rock". The song peaked at number 27 on the UK charts and number 58 in Australia. The song was also included on the soundtrack to the 1996 PlayStation game Fox Hunt. A video for "Ricochet" was filmed in Paris and directed by Alex Hemmings. It does not appear on the video collection, Who Cares a Lot? The Greatest Videos.

The album's third and final single was "Evidence", released on May 8, 1995. The song draws from jazz and lounge music, and was the only light song from the album to be released as a single. In April 1995, CMJ New Music Monthly wrote that it had guitar work reminiscent of Isaac Hayes and 1970s soul music. Faith No More made an appearance the previous month on the Australian variety show Hey Hey It's Saturday to perform the song, which eventually peaked at number 32 in the UK and number 27 in Australia. A video was made for the song, directed by Walter A. Stern. In 1997, the song was used in an episode of Homicide: Life on the Street, titled "Deception".

=== Other songs ===
A total of twenty tracks were recorded for the album, with only fourteen making the final listing. Cut tracks "I Won't Forget You" and "Hippie Jam Song" both appeared on the later compilations Who Cares a Lot? The Greatest Hits (1998) and The Very Best Definitive Ultimate Greatest Hits Collection (2009). Covers of the Bee Gees' 1968 pop song "I Started a Joke" and the 1960 folk song "Greenfields" were included as B-sides to the single "Digging the Grave", with the "I Started a Joke" cover later being released as a single in 1998, shortly after Faith No More's disbandment. Additionally, covers of GG Allin's 1985 hardcore punk song "I Wanna Fuck Myself" and the 1965 easy listening song "Spanish Eyes" were both included as B-sides to the singles "Ricochet" and "Evidence".

The album closer "Just a Man" is a gospel-style song that was also influenced by Chinese classical music. Patton's vocal track for "Just a Man" was based on the style of Anthony Newley. "Cuckoo for Caca" and "Ugly in the Morning" are among the heaviest songs on the album. In 1996, Rolling Stone labelled "Ugly in the Morning" a thrash metal song, while "Cuckoo for Caca" has been described as drawing from death metal and grindcore music. CMJ New Music Monthly wrote in April 1995 that "Cuckoo for Caca" is a "grindcore shaker", and that on it Patton is "growling like a grizzly who just awoke from hibernation." "Ugly in the Morning" later appeared in a 2016 episode of FX series It's Always Sunny in Philadelphia, titled "Being Frank". The series stars Danny DeVito, a fan of the band and friend of Patton since the 2000s.

"Star A.D." has been considered a swing or big band song, and some have likened its sound to Las Vegas casino music. It makes an appearance on the 2008 compilation The Works, and was only played a single time in 2011, as part of a show where Faith No More performed the album in its entirety. The song's lack of live performance is likely due to its incorporation of trumpets. When asked if the song's lyrics referenced Kurt Cobain's suicide, Mike Patton stated in 1995 "God no! It's about a phenomenon. And if that guy happened to be one, I don't know. It's one of those things that happen; it's a Vegas thing. What could be more shameful than having to change your colostomy bag on stage?! Vegas is great, though. I love it. Welcome to America". The song "What a Day" includes the line "Kill the body and the head will die", which was taken from Hunter S. Thompson's 1971 book Fear and Loathing in Las Vegas. In a late 1994 interview, Bottum described the penultimate track "The Last to Know" as "Pearl Jam on mushrooms". The song "Caralho Voador" translates to "Flying Dick" in Portuguese. It stylistically draws from Brazilian bossa nova music, although in a 1995 interview with MTV Brasil, Patton claimed that the song originally sounded more like The Police. He said, "it was going in the wrong direction, sounding like 80s pop, so we thought we would give it a little bit of a Brazilian sabor." "The Gentle Art of Making Enemies" was one of only two non-singles to be included on the first disc of the band's initial greatest hits release, Who Cares a Lot? The Greatest Hits, and in April 1995, CMJ New Music Monthly labelled it as "pure punk adrenaline". It has soft, spoken word-like interludes in between the more aggressive parts of the song. The melodic main chorus also contrasts the aggressive nature of much of the song, with Kerrang! writing in 2020 that it is "veering between outright abrasiveness and soothing melody". The song's meaning has never been explained, and according to Kerrang!, some believe it could possibly revolve around prison rape or contempt directed towards an artist who has found success.

"Take This Bottle" is a country ballad that deals with alcoholism. In April 1995, CMJ New Music Monthly described it as having "twangy country" instrumentation, and compared Patton's vocals on it to country singer Tex Ritter. The band had previously explored country music on the song "RV" from Angel Dust. However, that song also incorporated comedic spoken word verses, and had a brief distorted metal breakdown towards the end. Faith No More's former singer Chuck Mosley later did live covers of "Take This Bottle" during solo shows in the 2010s. Mosley battled substance abuse issues during his life and eventually died of a drug overdose in 2017.

== Touring ==
The King for a Day... Fool for a Lifetime tour lasted from February 1995 to September 1995. It covered North America, South America, Europe, Australia, New Zealand and Japan. The band had two separate runs of shows in Australia, with the first being as part of the inaugural edition of the Alternative Nation festival in April 1995, and the next being in August 1995. The band performed at four Alternative Nation festival dates, alongside artists including Body Count, Lou Reed, Nine Inch Nails, Powderfinger, Regurgitator, Ween, The Tea Party and Tool. This festival was originally going to be headlined by the Red Hot Chili Peppers, but they pulled out since singer Anthony Kiedis was entering rehab (although the reason given to the media was "chronic fatigue"). The two bands had toured together when Chuck Mosley was still Faith No More's singer, but Kiedis and Patton had been involved in a public feud following the success of Faith No More's 1989 single "Epic", and they hadn't played any shows together following this. Kiedis would later get Patton's other band Mr. Bungle kicked off several festivals in 1999 and 2000, since he allegedly did not want to perform alongside Patton.

The album's touring cycle had begun with a run of European shows in early 1995, and for these shows Faith No More were supported by New Zealand band Shihad. They would go on to support Faith No More again for their 1997 Album of the Year Tour shows in Australia. For Faith No More's North American shows in mid-1995, they were supported by noise rock band Steel Pole Bath Tub. Other artists that they shared bills with in 1995 include Alice Cooper, Biohazard, Blues Traveler, Bush, Clawfinger, Collective Soul, Duran Duran, Filter, the Goo Goo Dolls, Jennifer Trynin, Live, Ozzy Osbourne, Paradise Lost, Poster Children, Rata Blanca, Rollins Band, Sheryl Crow, Treponem Pal, and Weezer. Following Faith No More's performance at the 1995 Pinkpop Festival in the Netherlands, Mike Patton did a seven minute interview on Dutch TV with Billy Graziadei from hardcore band Biohazard, who also performed at the festival.

During the tour, they performed their previously recorded covers of "War Pigs" by Black Sabbath, "I Started a Joke" by the Bee Gees, "Easy" by the Commodores, "Let's Lynch the Landlord" by the Dead Kennedys and "I Wanna Fuck Myself" by GG Allen. They also covered snippets of "What's Up?" by 4 Non Blondes, "Iron Man" by Black Sabbath, "Paranoid" by Black Sabbath, "Livin' on a Prayer" by Bon Jovi, "Zombie" by The Cranberries, "Telephone Line" by Electric Light Orchestra, "Rock & Roll, Part II" by Gary Glitter, "Carnaval in Rio" by Heino, "Stairway to Heaven" by Led Zeppelin, "Creeping Death" by Metallica, "Enter Sandman" by Metallica, "Move Your Ass!" by Scooter, "All I Wanna Do" by Sheryl Crow, "The 500 Club" by Steel Pool Bath Tub, and "Back for Good" by Take That. For intro music, the band used John Barry's theme from the 1960 film Beat Girl, "Let's Have a Wonderful Time" by The John Barry Seven and "Stranger in Paradise" by Tony Bennett. For outro music, they sometimes used the music from Disney's Main Street Electrical Parade. At one show in Chile during September 1995, their intro music was sections from Elmer Bernstein's score for the 1955 film The Man with the Golden Arm. During shows in South America, the band would also perform "Evidence" in Portuguese or Spanish rather than English. On over 20 occasions, they performed a roughly two minute long cover of the song "Glory Box", by British trip-hop group Portishead. At a March 1995 show in Germany, the band covered "Glory Box", but used the lyrics to the Christmas song "Jingle Bells" rather than the original lyrics. The band's next album Album of the Year would include a song called "Stripsearch", which had a similar trip-hop sound inspired by Portishead and other contemporary electronic artists they were listening to during this period.

With their American shows, the band were often playing in smaller venues, partially as a result of Angel Dust's commercial underperformance in the United States. The band had previously toured U.S. arenas on their previous two albums, while being a support act for large artists such as Billy Idol, Metallica and Guns N' Roses. However, they were still experiencing success in foreign markets, including Australia, South America, the United Kingdom and Europe. At the time, Patton said, "in a lot of parts of the world Angel Dust did better [than The Real Thing]. It's a strange thing, we spend a lot more time overseas than in the United States. It seems like our focus has always been there. "Epic" was kind of a hit worldwide." In a 1997 interview with SFGate, Gould reflected, "I don't think it's necessarily important to sell 5 million records or play to 30,000 people. It's really down to liking what you do and being comfortable up there onstage", adding "we were an oddball band when MTV picked us and played us. Who happens, and who doesn't happen, can be very arbitrary. It can be whatever a program director's daughter is listening to".

In November 2011, Faith No More reunited with Trey Spruance for a performance at the Maquinaria Festival in Chile, during which the album was played in its entirety.

== Reception ==
Professional ratings
Review scores
Source	Rating
AllMusic	3.5/5 stars
The Austin Chronicle	3/5 stars
The Buffalo News	3.5/5 stars
Entertainment Weekly	C−
Los Angeles Daily News	2.5/4 stars
Los Angeles Times	3/4 stars
Q	3/5 stars
Record Collector	5/5 stars
Rolling Stone	2/5 stars
Select	3/5
Spin	6/10

Unlike Faith No More's previous albums, initial reception to King for a Day... Fool for a Lifetime was mixed. Entertainment Weekly gave the album a grade of C− and called it an "archaic progressive-rock fusion, oddly out of step with the times". Al Weisel of Rolling Stone gave it a rating of two stars out of five, saying "one hopes that that last song's moving chorus – 'Don't let me die with this silly look in my eyes' – doesn't prove to be Faith No More's epitaph". Metal Hammer acknowledges that the album was met with "crushing disappointment", but praised its diversity. Michael Snyder of the San Francisco Chronicle, however, was more favorable, calling it "an utter triumph", adding that it was "enigmatic, sarcastic, provocative and incisive". Spin magazine's Jonathan Gold rated the album 6 out of 10, praising its "deftness" and its "burnished, jackhammer-sheathed-in-a-lubricated-condom presence", but feeling that its multiple genres were a distraction. On April 28, 1995, Andy Langer of The Austin Chronicle gave it three out of five stars. He wrote that it was a more collaborative effort than Angel Dust, which he considered to be primarily influenced by Patton, and also said it would "make sense" if the record was successful, since contemporary bands like The Mighty Mighty Bosstones and Big Chief were "[relaying] the more commercial groundwork FNM's 'Epic' originally provided way back when."

Writing for AllMusic, Greg Prato gave it a more positive rating of three-and-a-half stars out of five, while calling it one of the band's "underrated releases". Prato also pointed out the breadth of genres covered by the album's songs. This variety was also described as a "genre shuffle" by a Rolling Stone biography of the band. New York magazine described the album as "baroquely, nightmarishly weird", praising Mike Patton's vocals. Writing for the Los Angeles Daily News, Bruce Warren rated the album two-and-a-half stars out of four, writing that the band "sounds more accomplished than ever", and singling Bottum's keyboards out as particularly noteworthy. Anthony Violanti of The Buffalo News gave the album a rating of three-and-a-half stars out of five, noting that "Patton still acts wild but has matured as a singer", and describing "Digging the Grave" as a "power pop masterpiece".

=== Legacy and accolades ===
King for a Day... Fool for a Lifetime was nominated for a Bay Area Music Award in 1995, in the category "Hard Music Album or EP". Bassist Billy Gould also received a nomination for Best Bassist at the same event. However, neither nomination was won; Gould lost out to Les Claypool of Primus, while the album itself was beaten by Green Day's Insomniac.

The Encyclopedia of Heavy Metal (2009) describes this album and 1997's Album of the Year as "more lackluster and less experimental" than previous releases. Two years after it was released, Gould said "I'm proud of that record. I think the biggest criticism that it gets is that it didn't sell. It's really ironic. If you judge a record by that kind of logic, then the Ford Taurus would be the greatest car ever made in the history of mankind because it's the highest-selling car ever sold". In 2005, Germany's Visions magazine ranked King for a Day... Fool for a Lifetime 37 in their list of "150 Albums for Eternity". In 2016, Metal Hammer included it on their "10 essential alt-metal albums" list. In 2015, Spin described the album as having "a more streamlined version of the sound that Incubus would soon take to the headlining stadium slot that Faith No More only encircled." In 2015, Papa Roach's vocalist Jacoby Shaddix called King for a Day... Fool for a Lifetime his favorite Faith No More album, and said that if he could witness the recording of any classic album, it would be that album.

==== Covers ====
Throughout 2001, Papa Roach performed "The Gentle Art of Making Enemies" during live shows. In February 2001, it was announced that Papa Roach would record a studio version of this cover for a Faith No More tribute album, although this album never came to fruition. For the album, it was also announced that Taproot would be covering "Ricochet". In 2002, a different tribute album for Faith No More with mostly independent artists was released, titled Tribute of the Year. It featured covers of "Digging the Grave" by Son of Indra, "King for a Day" by Medulla Nocte and "The Gentle Art of Making Enemies" by Imbue. The B-side "Absolute Zero" was also covered on Tribute of the Year, by Ichabod. A cover of "Digging the Grave" by metalcore band 36 Crazyfists appeared on a 2006 Kerrang! compilation titled High Voltage, with the band having earlier covered the song live in 2002. The 36 Crazyfists cover was later included on a digital special edition of their 2004 album A Snow Capped Romance. "The Gentle Art of Making Enemies" was covered live by post-hardcore band Finch during 2005. In 2013, Slaves on Dope covered "Digging the Grave" as part of their EP Covers Vol 1. The following year, it was covered by Afro-punk band Radkey. Later in 2014, lullaby versions of "Evidence" and "King for a Day" were released by music collective Twinkle Twinkle Little Rock Star, as part of an album of lullaby covers for Faith No More. In 2024, Texas outlaw country singer Cody Jinks released a cover of "Take this Bottle".

== Release history ==
King for a Day... Fool for a Lifetime was pre-released as a limited-edition two-record vinyl album, limited to 10,000 copies, two weeks before the album went on general sale. It was also released in a limited run of 7 x 7 inch records packaged in a hard card box, with bonus tracks and audio interviews with all the band members included.

== Track listing ==
All tracks are written by Mike Bordin, Roddy Bottum, Billy Gould, and Mike Patton, except where noted.

No.	Title	Writer(s)	Length
1.	"Get Out"		2:17
2.	"Ricochet"		4:28
3.	"Evidence"		4:53
4.	"The Gentle Art of Making Enemies"		3:28
5.	"Star A.D."		3:22
6.	"Cuckoo for Caca"		3:41
7.	"Caralho Voador"		4:01
8.	"Ugly in the Morning"		3:06
9.	"Digging the Grave"		3:04
10.	"Take This Bottle"		4:59
11.	"King for a Day"		6:35
12.	"What a Day"		2:37
13.	"The Last to Know"	Bordin, Gould, Patton	4:27
14.	"Just a Man"		5:35
Total length:			56:33

Bonus tracks
No.	Title	Writer(s)	Length
15.	"Absolute Zero" (Japanese bonus track)		4:09
16.	"I Started a Joke" (Brazilian bonus track)	Barry Gibb, Robin Gibb, Maurice Gibb	3:00
17.	"Evidence" (Spanish, Argentinian bonus track)		4:53
Total length:			68:35

Bonus disc (2016 Deluxe Edition)
No.	Title	Length
1.	"Evidence" (Spanish)	3:58
2.	"Absolute Zero"	4:05
3.	"Greenfields" (The Brothers Four cover)	3:42
4.	"I Started a Joke" (Bee Gees cover)	3:01
5.	"Spanish Eyes" (Bert Kaempfert cover)	2:59
6.	"I Won't Forget You"	4:10
7.	"Hippie Jam Song"	4:56
8.	"Instrumental"	5:00
9.	"I Wanna Fuck Myself" (GG Allin cover)	2:55
10.	"Evidence" (Portuguese)	3:56
11.	"Digging the Grave" (Live)	3:13
12.	"The Gentle Art of Making Enemies" (Live)	3:39
13.	"Interview" (B-Side)	9:28
Total length:		55:06

7×7″ box set track listing

Disc 1 (sides A and B)
No.	Title	Writer(s)	Length
1.	"Digging the Grave"		3:04
2.	"I Started a Joke"	B. Gibb, R. Gibb, M. Gibb	3:00
3.	"Interview with Billy Gould"

Disc 2 (sides C and D)
No.	Title	Writer(s)	Length
1.	"Ricochet"		4:28
2.	"I Wanna Fuck Myself"	GG Allin	2:55
3.	"Interview with Mike Bordin"

Disc 3 (sides E and F)
No.	Title	Length
1.	"Evidence"	4:53
2.	"The Gentle Art of Making Enemies"	3:28
3.	"Interview with Roddy Bottum"

Disc 4 (sides G and H)
No.	Title	Length
1.	"Take This Bottle"	4:59
2.	"Cuckoo for Caca"	3:41
3.	"Interview with Dean Menta"

Disc 5 (sides I and J)
No.	Title	Writer(s)	Length
1.	"What a Day"		2:37
2.	"The Last to Know"	Bordin, Gould, Patton	4:27
3.	"Interview with Mike Patton"

Disc 6 (sides K and L)
No.	Title	Writer(s)	Length
1.	"Ugly in the Morning"		3:06
2.	"Greenfields"	Terry Gilkyson, Richard Dehr, Frank Miller	3:41
3.	"Get Out"		2:17
4.	"Just a Man"		5:35

Disc 7 (sides M and N)
No.	Title	Writer(s)	Length
1.	"King for a Day"		6:35
2.	"Star A.D."		3:22
3.	"Caralho Voador"		4:01
4.	"Spanish Eyes"	Bert Kaempfert, Charles Singleton, Eddie Snyder	2:59

== Personnel ==
All personnel credits for King for a Day… Fool for a Lifetime are adapted from the album's liner notes.

Faith No More

- Mike Bordin – drums
- Roddy Bottum – keyboards
- Billy Gould – bass
- Mike Patton – vocals

Additional musicians

- Trey Spruance – guitars

Production

- Andy Wallace – production, recording, mixing
- Faith No More – production
- Clif Norrell – recording
- Chris Laidlaw – assistant engineer
- Steve Sisco – assistant mix engineer
- Howie Weinberg – mastering
- Melinda Maniscalco – art direction and design
- Robin Whiteside – production design
- Eric Drooker – illustration
- Marko Lavrisha – photography

== Charts ==
=== Weekly charts ===
Chart (1995)	Peak position
Australian Albums (ARIA)	2
Austrian Albums (Ö3 Austria)	9
Belgian Albums (Ultratop Flanders)	6
Belgian Albums (Ultratop Wallonia)	10
Canadian Albums (RPM)	39
Dutch Albums (Album Top 100)	8
Finnish Albums (Suomen virallinen lista)	22
German Albums (Offizielle Top 100)	8
Hungarian Albums (MAHASZ)	8
Irish Albums (IRMA)	9
New Zealand Albums (RMNZ)	3
Norwegian Albums (VG-lista)	6
Scottish Albums (Official Charts)	7
Swedish Albums (Sverigetopplistan)	5
Swiss Albums (Schweizer Hitparade)	7
UK Albums (Official Charts)	5
US Billboard 200	31

Chart (2025)	Peak position
Greek Albums (IFPI)	13

=== Year-end charts ===
Chart (1995)	Position
Austrian Albums (Ö3 Austria)	37
Belgian Albums (Ultratop Flanders)	75
Belgian Albums (Ultratop Wallonia)	92
German Albums (Offizielle Top 100)	45
New Zealand Albums (RMNZ)	32
Swiss Albums (Schweizer Hitparade)	48

=== Singles ===
Title	Peak chart positions							
Title	AUS	FRA	NLD	NOR	NZ	SWE	SWI	UK
"Digging the Grave"	12	23	—	11	16	39	42	16
"Ricochet"	58	—	—	—	—	—	—	27
"Evidence"	27	—	42	—	38	—	—	32

== Certifications ==
Region	Certification	Certified units/sales
Australia (ARIA)	Gold	35,000^{^}
United Kingdom (BPI)	Gold	100,000^{^}
^{^} Shipments figures based on certification alone.
