= Mighty Joe Plum =

American rock band

- Origin: Tampa, Florida, United States
- Genres: Alternative rock Post-grunge
- Label: Atlantic Records
- Members: Brett Williams - vocals, guitar Mark Busto - drums Andy Stafford - vocals, guitar Steve Dube - bass
- Past members: Davy Mason - bass Marlin Clark - guitar Mark Mercado - percussion Steve Marotta - guitar Shane Cohn - drums

Mighty Joe Plum was an American alternative rock band active in the late 1990s. They are best known for their US radio hit, "Live Through This (Fifteen Stories)". Singer Brett Williams died on June 14, 2024.

== History ==
Mighty Joe Plum formed in Tampa, Florida in the mid-1990s. In their early career, they played in two Battle of the Bands competitions, the second of which they won. After developing a solid fan base in Central Florida, they recorded the "Aardvark" EP and toured in support of it. During this time radio stations picked up the song "Live Through This (Fifteen Stories)" . The band signed to Atlantic Records in 1996 and released an album, The Happiest Dogs. The single "Live Through This" climbed to No. 6 on Billboard's Mainstream Rock Tracks chart. The band toured all over the US, Canada, and Mexico in support of the album, playing shows and headlining with bands such as Foo Fighters, Creed, Matchbox Twenty, Toad the Wet Sprocket, and Seven Mary Three.

in 2007, the band released the single "Free Again", from the forthcoming LP "Pedaling Home".

On June 14, 2024, lead singer Brett Williams, died at the age of 52.

== Discography ==
- Aardvark EP (Ear Drops Music, 1996)
- The Happiest Dogs (Atlantic, 1997)

Year	Title	Chart Positions	Album
Year	Title	US Mainstream Rock	Album
1997	"Live Through This (Fifteen Stories)"	#6	The Happiest Dogs
