= Music Hall (Hanover) =

Former concert venue in Hanover, Germany

Coordinates: 52.3574°N 9.7153°E

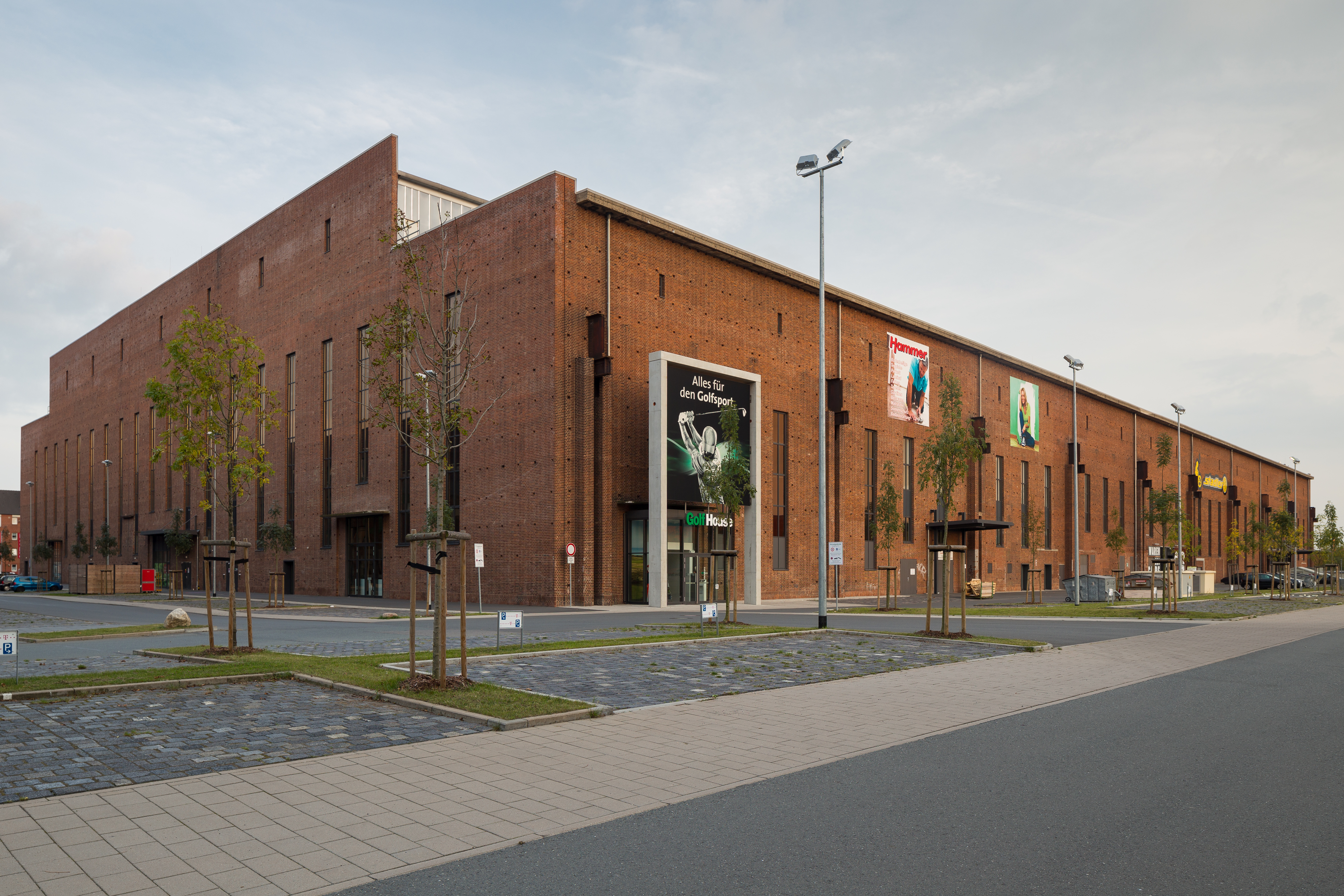
Venue in 2014

The Music Hall was a concert venue in Hanover, Germany. It was located in the "U-boat hall" on the former Hanomag complex. The structure was originally built in 1943 as a submarine production facility in the northern shipyard of Kriegsmarinewerft Wilhelmshaven. Notable performers included Rush, Sting, Roxette, David Bowie, and Phish. The front part of the structure contains now a bicycle store.
