= Another Body Murdered =

Single by Faith No More and Boo-Yaa T.R.I.B.E.

from the album Judgment Night Soundtrack
- Released: September 1993
- Genre: Rap metal
- Length: 4:22
- Label: Epic Soundtrax; Immortal
- Songwriters: Billy Gould; Boo-Yaa T.R.I.B.E.; Mike Bordin; Mike Patton; Roddy Bottum
- Producers: Ghetto Guerillas; Boo-Yaa T.R.I.B.E.; Faith No More

Faith No More singles chronology
"Easy" (1993)	"Another Body Murdered" (1993)	"Digging the Grave" (1995)

"Another Body Murdered" is a 1993 single by Faith No More and Boo-Yaa T.R.I.B.E., taken from the soundtrack album for the film Judgment Night. The brainchild of Cypress Hill's manager, Happy Walters, the soundtrack paired rock and hip-hop acts on each of its songs; Faith No More sought out the American-Samoan Boo-Yaa T.R.I.B.E. after becoming interested in Samoan a capella singing. Charting in several countries, including Ireland, New Zealand, and the United Kingdom, "Another Body Murdered" has received mixed reactions from music critics, with some seeing it as a harbinger of later acts such as Korn or Limp Bizkit, and others comparing it unfavourably to Public Enemy and Anthrax's earlier crossover single "Bring the Noise".

== Production ==
The 1993 film Judgment Night featured a soundtrack album composed entirely of collaborations between hip-hop and rock acts; the soundtrack was the brainchild of Cypress Hill manager Happy Walters. He was inspired to create the pairings based on several influences in the early 1990s―the emergence of Rage Against the Machine's rap-influenced rock sound, and the success of Cypress Hill opening for a Pearl Jam concert in Seattle.

Following the release of their 1992 album Angel Dust, Faith No More received several offers to appear on compilation albums, with bass player Billy Gould feeling that the Judgment Night offer sounded unique, described it as "something that we could do that’s kind of cool". Gould and singer Mike Patton requested to work with the American Samoan group Boo-Yaa T.R.I.B.E. after becoming interested in Samoan a capella music, and were impressed by the latter group's instrumentation. Faith No More's guitar player at the time, Jim Martin, did not wish to participate, so Gould provided the guitar parts for the single, with Boo-Yaa T.R.I.B.E. providing bass guitar. During the music video shoot for the single, the band staged an intervention for keyboard player Roddy Bottum, who had been dealing with a heroin addiction at the time; Bottum successfully quit the drug after attending rehab as a result.

== Release ==
"Another Body Murdered" was released as a single in September 1993. It subsequently charted in several countries, including Ireland, where it spent four weeks in the Irish Singles Chart, reaching a peak position of 13; New Zealand, where it reached number 41 during a two-week chart run; and the United Kingdom, reaching a high point of number 26 during its three weeks in the UK Singles Chart.

== Reception and legacy ==
You can almost imagine Fred Durst’s cousin Marvin excitedly calling him to play this over the phone.

— Writer Sean O'Neal on the song's influence

"Another Body Murdered" has been described by Jeremy Allen of The Guardian as a "grim dog-eat-dog tale of foul play" that serves to showcase Mike Patton's versatile vocal range. Writing for The A.V. Club, Sean O'Neal described the song as having "a chest-puffing, smack-talking energy that’s undeniable". O'Neal cited it as an influence on later bands such as Korn or Limp Bizkit, stating "you can definitely hear the ground being laid for the scores of bands who would strip Faith No More of all its oddball eccentricity, then regurgitate only its meatiest chunks". A contemporary review in Spin magazine by Mark Blackwell was unfavourable towards the release, finding it to be overly derivative of the earlier Anthrax and Public Enemy collaboration "Bring the Noise", writing that "it's a concept that wears thin fast".

=== Cover versions ===
A cover of the song by SMP appeared on the Faith No More tribute album Tribute of the Year (2002). In 2019, the song was covered by Australian metal band Superheist.

== Track listing ==
All songs written by Billy Gould, Boo-Yaa T.R.I.B.E., Mike Bordin, Mike Patton and Roddy Bottum, except where specified

CD single
No.	Title	Length
1.	"Another Body Murdered (Remix)"	4:09
2.	"Another Body Murdered (Radio edit)"	3:55
3.	"Another Body Murdered (Album version)"	4:22

12" Maxi single
No.	Title	Writer(s)	Artist	Length
1.	"Another Body Murdered (Remix)"			4:09
2.	"Another Body Murdered (Album version)"			4:22
3.	"Just Another Victim (T-Ray Devil Worship Mix)"	Helmet and House of Pain	Helmet and House of Pain	4:35
4.	"Just Another Victim (T-Ray Dead and Stinking Mix)"	Helmet and House of Pain	Helmet and House of Pain	4:35

== Charts ==
Chart (1993)	Peak position
Europe (Eurochart Hot 100)	57
Ireland (IRMA)	13
New Zealand (Recorded Music NZ)	41
UK Singles (Official Charts)	26

== Footnotes ==
=== References ===
- Chirazi, Steffan (1994). The Real Story. Castle Communications. ISBN 978-1898141150.
- Harte, Adrian (2018). Small Victories: The True Story of Faith No More. Jawbone Press. ISBN 978-1911036371.
