= Faith No More =

American rock band

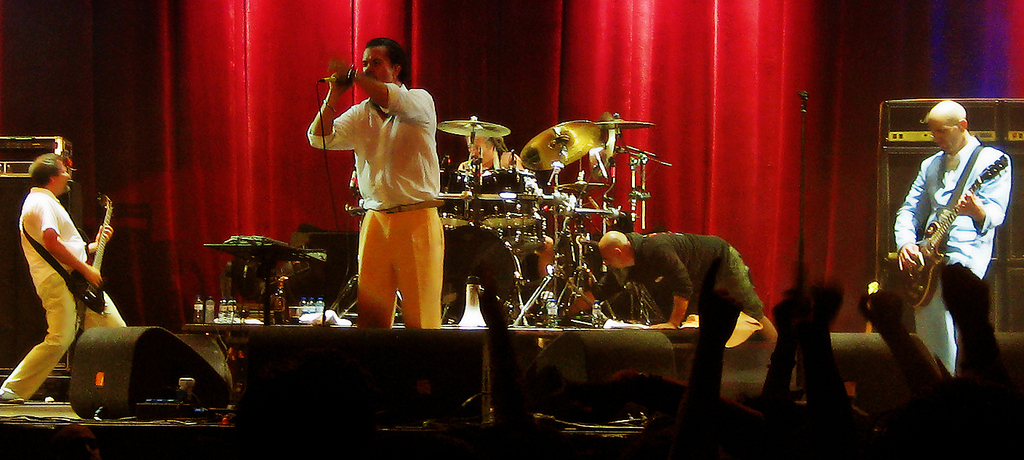
- Faith No More performing in Portugal in 2009

Background information
- Also known as: Faith. No Man.; Sharp Young Men; FNM
- Origin: San Francisco, California, U.S.
- Genres: Alternative metal; funk metal; alternative rock; experimental rock; post-punk (early)
- Works: Albums and singles; songs
- Years active: 1979–1998; 2009–2021; 2026–present
- Labels: Slash; Reprise; Mordam; Reclamation!; Ipecac
- Members: Mike Bordin; Billy Gould; Roddy Bottum; Mike Patton; Trey Spruance
- Past members: Mike Morris; Wade Worthington; Courtney Love; Mark Bowen; Chuck Mosley; Jim Martin; Dean Menta; Jon Hudson
- Website: fnm.com

Faith No More is an American rock band from San Francisco, California, formed in 1979. The band rose to prominence with the lineup of bassist Billy Gould, drummer Mike Bordin, keyboardist/rhythm guitarist Roddy Bottum, guitarist Jim Martin – who all played on the debut album – and vocalist Mike Patton, who joined in 1988.

Before September 1983, the band performed under the names Sharp Young Men and later Faith. No Man. The band's first two albums, We Care a Lot (1985) and Introduce Yourself (1987), featured singer Chuck Mosley. With Patton's addition, Faith No More broke through with the platinum-selling The Real Thing (1989) and gold-selling Angel Dust (1992). The band recorded hit singles such as "Epic", which reached No. 9 in the U.S., and a cover of the Commodores' "Easy", which was a worldwide hit in Australia and Europe. Martin left the band in 1993. After two temporary replacements, Trey Spruance and Dean Menta, Jon Hudson joined as Faith No More's guitarist in 1996.

The band broke up in 1998 after six albums, but reunited in 2009 to begin The Second Coming Tour before releasing Sol Invictus, their first record in 18 years, in 2015. Faith No More attempted to tour in 2020, which was first derailed by the COVID-19 pandemic and later canceled because of Patton's mental health, resulting in the band's second hiatus. Faith No More announced a second reunion in 2026, and plans to tour in 2027, with Spruance rejoining as Hudson's replacement.

== History ==
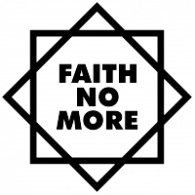
The band's classic logo, used on the 1985 debut We Care a Lot. It was originally designed by bassist Billy Gould as an homage to the Symbol of Chaos.

=== Early days as Sharp Young Men and Faith. No Man (1979–1983) ===
The genesis of Faith No More was the group Sharp Young Men, formed in 1979 by vocalist/guitarist Mike Morris and keyboardist Wade Worthington. Worthington was a trained pianist and first met Morris in 1978. For years, Worthington had been interested in forming a Jimmy Smith-style jazz project, with just him on organs and a drummer. When a previous musical group of theirs fell apart due to a lack of shows, Morris convinced Worthington to instead become part of a new band idea he had called Sharp Young Men. Morris had long been a fan of pop music, but this new project was inspired by post-punk artists he had recently started listening to.

Having heard about drummer Mike Bordin, who had played in local San Francisco bands, Morris and Worthington talked him into joining Sharp Young Men. According to Morris, it took significantly longer for them to find a bassist, with the band eventually recruiting Billy Gould via a newspaper ad around 1980. Gould had moved from Los Angeles to begin his first year at the UC Berkeley, which put him in the same area as the other members. Between March 1982 and August 1982, Sharp Young Men did a 12 show club tour of the San Francisco Bay Area. In 1982, a three-song demo cassette was also released under the Sharp Young Men name, which featured the songs "Alive", "Decay" and "Life Is Tough for Me". Morris called the Sharp Young Men name "a piss-take on all the 'elegant' groups at the time", and claimed on their early music he was influenced by Killing Joke, Theatre of Hate and The Blackouts. Later in 1983, he proposed the name Faith In No Man, but eventually the band settled on Bordin's suggestion, Faith. No Man. (stylized with either two full stops or two bullet points).

Faith. No Man released their debut 7-inch vinyl single, "Quiet in Heaven/Song of Liberty", in 1983 via Ministry of Propaganda Records. Both songs were recorded in producer Matt Wallace's parents' garage, where Wallace had set up and been running a recording studio while the band was still recording under the name Sharp Young Men. The band's name was Faith. No Man. for the release of the single, which featured two of the three songs recorded in Wallace's garage. Worthington left shortly thereafter, and was replaced on keyboards by Roddy Bottum, who had grown up in Los Angeles with Billy Gould. Bottum, Gould and Bordin soon quit the band together and formed Faith No More. They chose the name in September 1983 after it was suggested to them by a friend named Will Carpmill, who believed it accentuated the fact that "The Man" (Morris) was "No More".

In 2012, Morris said he had not spoken to Gould or Bottum since they quit Faith No Man in 1983, and that he also had not spoken to Bordin in many years, having only kept in regular contact with Worthington. During later interviews, the members gave reporters a fake story about the Faith No More name's origin, claiming that it was inspired by a real racehorse of the same name. The horse only began racing in 1988, five years after the band chose the name Faith No More.

=== Initial Faith No More lineups (1983–1984) ===
The band's first show as Faith No More, in October 1983, featured vocalist Joe Callahan (known as Joe Pop-o-Pie) and Jake Smith on guitar. The first release under the Faith No More name was a self-titled cassette in 1983, which featured their first live performance as Faith No More on Side A, and a 20-minute instrumental track on Side B, titled "New Love, Same Neuroses; New Hairstyles, Same Minds". By the beginning of 1984, Mark Bowen had replaced Smith on guitar. Throughout 1984, the band played with several vocalists and guitarists, including brief stints with vocalists Paula Frazer and Courtney Love. Frazer was originally from Arkansas and she went on to front the alt-country band Tarnation, which released music through Warner/Reprise Records in the 1990s. Love's stint as Faith No More vocalist began in February 1984, with Love having recently moved to San Francisco after living in Japan during the early 1980s. Love was dating Bottum while in Faith No More. When the two first met, they initially bonded over their shared zodiac sign, with Bottum claiming that she went on to "talk her way" into the band. Despite dating Love around this time, Bottum later came out as homosexual in 1993. One of Love's performances with Faith No More in San Francisco was taped and broadcast during the spring of 1984 on Viacom Public Access on Channel 25. Both Love and guitarist Mark Bowen had both left the band by June 1984. Regarding her departure, Love said in a 2010 VH1 interview that "Faith No More didn't want to have the image of a chick singer anymore", while Bottum claimed, "we wanted a male energy. That was sort of just the direction we needed to go in as a band."

The band eventually settled on vocalist Chuck Mosley around August 1984, with guitarist Jim Martin also joining during this period. Mosley had known Billy Gould since 1977, and previously performed with him in a Los Angeles new wave band called The Animated, which Gould was in prior to joining Sharp Young Men. Mosley appeared as Faith No More's vocalist on a 1984 self-titled demo cassette, which also featured earlier demos recorded with Frazer and Love. Martin had previously been a bandmate of Bordin during the late 1970s in EZ Street along with future Metallica bassist Cliff Burton, and had also been in a short-lived thrash metal project with Burton named Vicious Hatred.

=== We Care a Lot and Introduce Yourself (1985–1988) ===
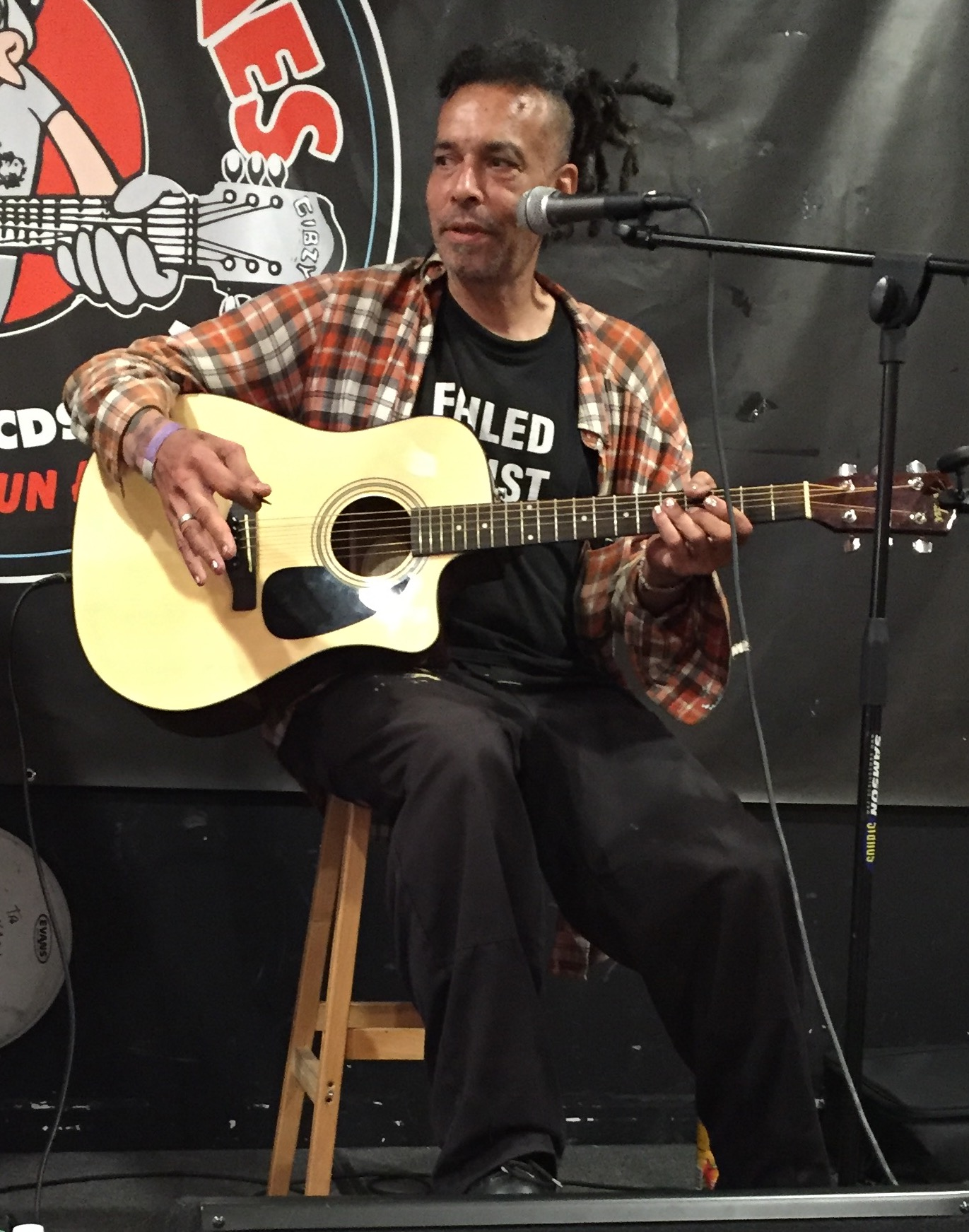
Faith No More's singer from 1984 to 1988, Chuck Mosley (photo from 2016)

The band initially started recording the album We Care a Lot without backing from a record label and, after pooling their money, recorded five songs. This gained the attention of Ruth Schwartz, who was then forming the independent label Mordam Records, under which the band, after getting the necessary financial support, finished and released the album. It was the first official release for both the band and the label.

In late 1986, Faith No More was signed to Los Angeles label Slash Records by Anna Statman. The label had recently been sold to Polygram subsidiary London Records, ensuring a widespread release for the band's following albums. Introduce Yourself was released in April 1987, and a revamped version of their debut album's title track "We Care a Lot" saw minor success on MTV. Mosley's behavior had started to become increasingly erratic, particularly during a troubled tour of Europe in 1988. Incidents include him allegedly punching Billy Gould on stage, the release party for the album Introduce Yourself—during which he fell asleep on stage—and one of Mosley's roadies getting into a fistfight with Martin during the European tour. Mosley was eventually fired after the band returned home from Europe. Gould reflected, "There was a certain point when I went to rehearsal, and Chuck wanted to do all acoustic guitar songs. It was just so far off the mark. The upshot was that I got up, walked out and quit the band. I just said: 'I'm done—I can't take this any longer. It's just so ridiculous'. The same day, I talked to Bordin, and he said: 'Well, I still want to play with you'. Bottum did the same thing. It was another one of these 'firing somebody without firing them' scenarios."

=== Mike Patton joins and The Real Thing (1989–1991) ===
Faith No More in a promotional photo for The Real Thing, c. 1989–1990

Mosley was replaced with singer Mike Patton in 1988. Patton, who was singing with his high school band, Mr. Bungle, was recruited at Martin's suggestion after he heard Mr. Bungle's first demo tape, The Raging Wrath of the Easter Bunny. According to Patton, he first met the band during a 1986 gig at "a pizza parlor" in his hometown of Eureka, California. Two weeks after joining Faith No More, he had written the lyrics to the songs that made up the Grammy award-nominated The Real Thing, which was released in June 1989.

"Epic" was released in January 1990 and was a top-10 hit. The music video received extensive airplay on MTV in 1990, and angered animal rights activists for a slow-motion shot of a fish flopping out of water at the end of the video. That same year, Faith No More performed at the 1990 MTV Video Music Awards (September 6) and on the 293rd episode of Saturday Night Live (December 1). "From Out of Nowhere" and "Falling to Pieces" were released as singles, and a cover of Black Sabbath's "War Pigs" was produced for non-vinyl releases. In 1990, the band did extensive touring in North America, and supported Billy Idol on his Charmed Life tour. That year, they played additional shows in Europe, Australia and New Zealand. This helped send The Real Thing to Platinum status in Canada, the U.S., and South America. The album also had big sales numbers in Australia, U.K., and the rest of Europe, pushing the total sales well above 4 million worldwide. In 1991, the band played their first shows in South America and Japan, before focusing on recording another studio album.

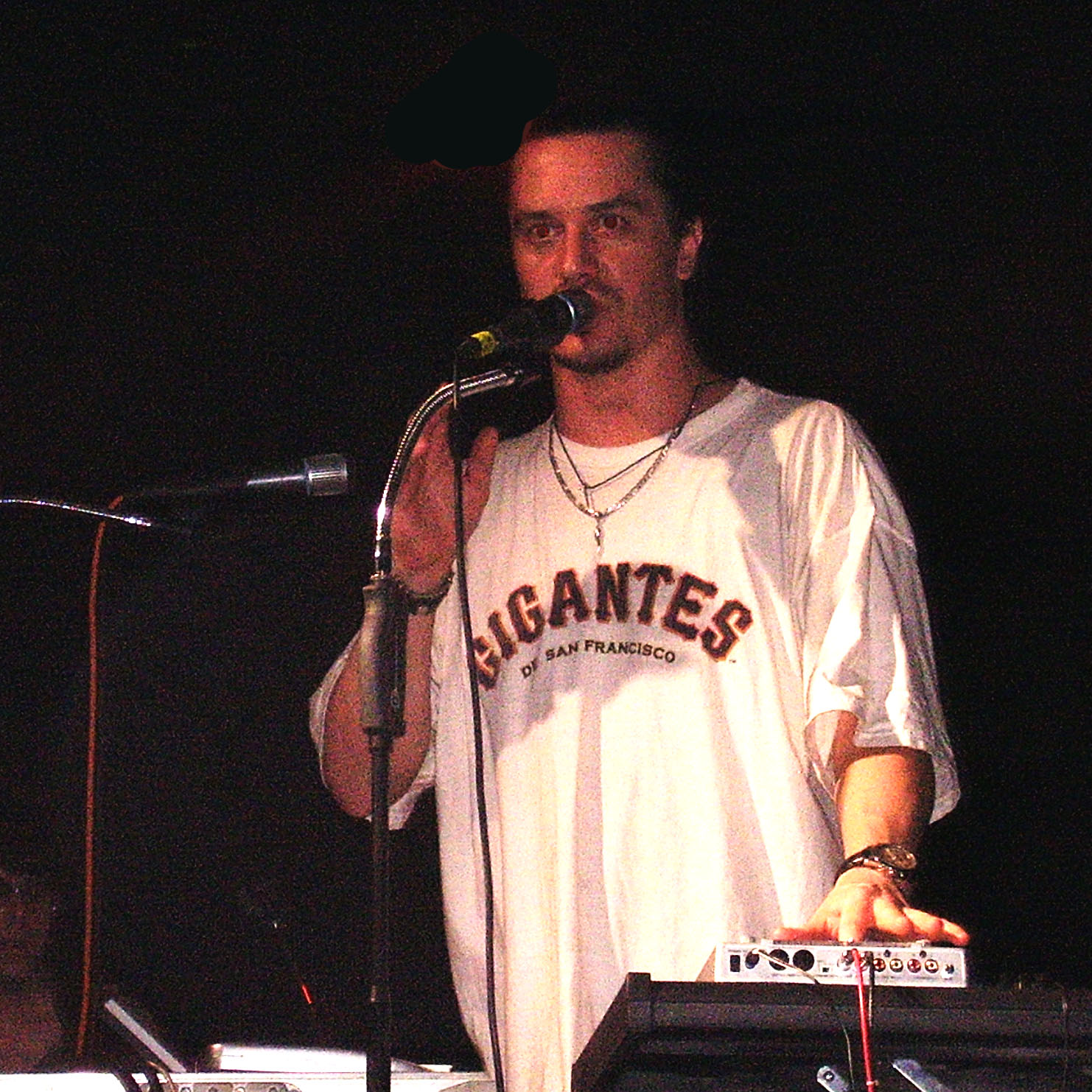
Vocalist Mike Patton joined Faith No More in 1988, succeeding Chuck Mosley

In February 1991, Faith No More released its only official live album, Live at the Brixton Academy. The album includes two previously unreleased studio tracks, "The Grade" and "The Cowboy Song". The same year, the band contributed the song "The Perfect Crime" to the soundtrack to Bill & Ted's Bogus Journey. Martin also made a brief cameo in the film as "Sir James Martin" as the head of the "Faith No More Spiritual and Theological Center". Patton's original band Mr. Bungle went on to sign with Slash and Reprise Records's parent label Warner Bros. Records in 1991, after the worldwide success of The Real Thing.

=== Angel Dust (1992–1994) ===
Faith No More displayed an even more experimental effort on its next album, Angel Dust, released in June 1992. One critic wrote that the album is "one of the more complex and simply confounding records ever released by a major label" and another that the single "'A Small Victory', which seems to run Madame Butterfly through Metallica and Nile Rodgers [...] reveals a developing facility for combining unlikely elements into startlingly original concoctions." Aside from "A Small Victory" (which received a nomination for Best Art Direction at the MTV Video Music Awards), the tracks "Midlife Crisis" and "Everything's Ruined" were also released as singles for Angel Dust in 1992. The album included a re-recording of the theme to the film Midnight Cowboy, and later pressings included a cover of The Commodores' "Easy", which in some parts of the world became the band's biggest hit after being released as a single in 1993. Angel Dust charted one spot higher on the Billboard 200 than The Real Thing, but was not as commercially successful in the United States, selling 665,000 copies there. It outsold The Real Thing in many other countries. In Germany, the record was certified Gold for sales of more than 250,000 copies. The album also matched the sales of The Real Thing in Canada (Platinum) and Australia (Gold), and surpassed it in the Netherlands, France, Russia, and the U.K. Worldwide sales are around 3.1 million copies. Patton subsequently said that "in a lot of parts of the world Angel Dust did better [than The Real Thing]", adding that they eventually started spending more time touring overseas than in the United States.

In 1992, the band went on tour with Guns N' Roses and Soundgarden in Europe. A reason they were chosen was since Guns N' Roses singer Axl Rose was a fan of Faith No More and The Real Thing, with Rose saying in 1990 that Faith No More were the only band he was "jealous of". Faith No More later replaced Nirvana on a 1992 North American tour with Guns N' Roses and Metallica, after Kurt Cobain refused to perform with Guns N' Roses. Faith No More were at an August 26, 1992 concert in Montreal, Canada, where Metallica's James Hetfield was badly burned by pyrotechnics and Guns N' Roses incited a riot after performing hours late and leaving early. Faith No More were fired from the tour in September 1992, as they had started taking humorous jabs at Guns N' Roses in the media, in response to their behavior. Regarding the tours with Guns N' Roses, Bottum reflected in 1992, "at each stop on the tour, before Guns N' Roses would come to a town, they would have their crew arrive a day early and find the local club, where they'd give strippers backstage passes. Every night, the whole scenario was like millions of stripper chicks just hanging out waiting to do one of the band, or a roadie or whoever". In another interview, he added, "it was bananas. We just laughed at how fucking ridiculous they were." Following the Guns N' Roses and Metallica shows, the band continued to tour through to mid-1993, doing another two tours in Europe, another in North America and a tour of the Pacific Rim, including Australia, Guam, Hawaii, Japan, New Zealand and the Northern Mariana Islands.

In 1993, the band collaborated with American Samoan rap group Boo-Yaa T.R.I.B.E. on the song "Another Body Murdered" for the soundtrack of the film Judgment Night. After touring to support Angel Dust in the summer of 1993, longtime guitarist Martin left the band due to internal conflicts. He was reportedly unhappy with the band's change in musical direction on Angel Dust, calling it "gay disco". According to Bottum, Martin was fired via fax. Martin himself states it was his decision to leave. Both Godflesh guitarist Justin Broadrick and Killing Joke guitarist Geordie Walker were reportedly invited to join Faith No More after Martin's departure, but declined. The position was filled by Mike Patton's Mr. Bungle bandmate Trey Spruance, who left after recording 1995's King for a Day... Fool for a Lifetime, just before the band was to begin its world tour. Spruance was replaced by Dean Menta, the band's keyboard tech.

=== King for a Day..., Album of the Year and break-up (1995–1998) ===
The alternate "barking dog logo", based on the artwork for Faith No More's 1995 album King for a Day... Fool for a Lifetime

Faith No More's fifth studio album, King for a Day... Fool for a Lifetime, was released in March 1995, and varies greatly from song to song in style; punk, country, jazz, bossa nova, thrash metal, gospel music, along with other signature FNM elements, are woven together throughout the album. Singles included "Digging the Grave", "Evidence", and "Ricochet". The album featured Mr. Bungle's Trey Spruance on guitar. The record went Gold in the U.K., Australia, New Zealand, Netherlands and Germany, which gave the album a respectable sales figure of around 1.5 million copies; this was significantly lower than the sales of their previous albums. A 7 × 7-inch box set of singles was released, which included the B-sides and some interviews between the songs.

Album of the Year was released in June 1997 and featured yet another new guitarist, Jon Hudson, who was a former roommate of Billy Gould. The album debuted much higher than expected in some countries (for example, in Germany, the album debuted at No. 2 and stayed in the chart for 5 months). In Australia, Album of the Year went to No. 1 and was certified Platinum. The album charted in many countries in Europe. To date, Album of the Year has sold around 2 million copies worldwide. The singles "Ashes to Ashes" and "Last Cup of Sorrow" had minimal success (notably, the music video for "Last Cup of Sorrow", which featured actress Jennifer Jason Leigh, was inspired by the Alfred Hitchcock film Vertigo). "Stripsearch" was released as a single in various countries (excluding the U.S. and U.K.). The album received largely negative reviews from U.S.-based critics at the time. Rolling Stone magazine wrote in their June 1997 review, "[They] are floundering around desperately, groping for a sense of identity and direction in a decade that clearly finds them irrelevant". Following the album's release, Faith No More toured with Limp Bizkit in 1997, who were frequently booed by Faith No More's fans.

In early 1998, rumors of Faith No More's imminent demise began; commencing with a post to Faith No More newsgroup alt.music.faith-no-more claiming Mike Patton had quit the band in favor of side projects. This rumor, denied at the time, proved to be at least partly true. Faith No More played their last show in Lisbon, Portugal on April 7, 1998. The band cancelled their planned support tour for Aerosmith and on April 20, Billy Gould released a statement by email and fax, saying "[T]he decision among the members is mutual" and "the split will now enable each member to pursue his individual project(s) unhindered." The band "thank[ed] all of those fans and associates that have stuck with and supported the band throughout its history."

In early 2002, the band members reportedly received a multi-million dollar offer for a reunion tour festival. It was set to include Bush, Deftones, Incubus, Limp Bizkit, Papa Roach and Slipknot, and a meeting between Patton, Gould and members of these bands took place. The reunion tour festival did not go ahead and the band remained split.

=== Reformation (2009–2012) ===
Rumours that Faith No More would reunite for shows in the U.K. in the summer of 2009 were circulating in late November 2008, but were originally dismissed by bassist Billy Gould. He explained: "If anything like this were to happen, it would have to come from the band, and I haven't spoken with any of them in over a year. So as far as I know, there isn't anything to talk about, and I'm pretty sure that if you were to contact Patton, he would tell you the same thing."

However, on February 24, 2009, after months of speculation and rumors, Faith No More announced they would be reforming with a line-up identical to the Album of the Year era, embarking on a reunion tour called The Second Coming Tour. To coincide with the band's reunion tour, Rhino released the sixth Faith No More compilation, The Very Best Definitive Ultimate Greatest Hits Collection, a double album that includes their hit singles and b sides & rarities, in the U.K. on June 8. Faith No More then played in major European festivals including Download Festival in the U.K. in June, Hurricane and Southside festivals in Germany, Greenfield Festival in Switzerland, Hove Festival in Norway and Roskilde Festival in Denmark, among other dates. The tour continued into 2010 with appearances at the Soundwave Festival in Australian cities throughout February and March. During their tour, the band added covers to their repertoire including "Poker Face" by Lady Gaga, "Ben" by Michael Jackson and "Switch" by Siouxsie and the Banshees.

After an eleven-month hiatus, Faith No More played four shows in South America in November 2011. On the first date (November 8, 2011), the band played a "mystery song", which led to speculation of new material.

In November 2011, the band performed the entire King for a Day... Fool for a Lifetime album at the Maquinaria Festival in Chile with Trey Spruance on guitar.

They played at the Sonisphere France in France on July 7, 2012, and toured throughout Europe during that year. They added new covers during the 2012 shows, including "Niggas in Paris" by Jay-Z/Kanye West, "Never Gonna Give You Up" by Rick Astley and the internet meme song "Trololo" by Eduard Khil. Faith No More became temporarily inactive again. Mike Patton spent 2013 touring with his reformed rock supergroup Tomahawk, while the band's other members also pursued their own side projects. In July 2013, Billy Gould confirmed that the band's hiatus would not be permanent, saying "We will do something again only when all members are with the focus on that, and ready for the challenge. This is not the time... yet."

In a 2015 interview, Roddy Bottum said that the band originally intended to reform with guitarist Jim Martin for their reunion tour, but it did not happen.

=== Sol Invictus and hiatus (2015–2018) ===
On May 29, 2014, Faith No More posted a message (along with a photograph of Mike Patton) on their Twitter account, saying that "the reunion thing was fun, but now it's time to get a little creative." On July 4, Faith No More played their first show in two years at Hyde Park in London, supporting Black Sabbath. At that show, Faith No More debuted two new songs "Motherfucker" and "Superhero" (also known by fans as "Leader of Men"). On August 20, the band posted "The Reunion Tour is over; in 2015 things are going to change." These tweets led to speculation that the band was working on new material. On August 30, Gould said that the band is "considering doing something new", and may begin work on a new studio album at some point in the not-too-distant future, explaining, "to do something creative would be a really good thing to do." On September 2, Bill Gould revealed to Rolling Stone that the band had begun work on a new album. Faith No More headlined the final edition of Australia's Soundwave in February and March 2015.

The band released their seventh studio album, Sol Invictus, in May 2015. The songs on the album were influenced by The Cramps, Link Wray and Siouxsie and the Banshees. Speaking to Revolver, Gould described the song "Cone of Shame" as "blues-based rock and roll" that also draws from black metal. Describing the song "Matador", he said: "parts of it remind me of the first Siouxsie and the Banshees album. We used real pianos and that brings this organic quality to it to the music". The second single from the album, "Superhero", was shared by the band on March 1, 2015.

In August 2016, the band performed two concerts with former lead singer Chuck Mosley to celebrate the reissue of their debut album We Care a Lot. The band was billed as "Chuck Mosley & Friends" for the two shows and featured the lineup of Mosley, Mike Bordin, Billy Gould, Jon Hudson and Roddy Bottum. Mosley died on November 9, 2017 at the age of 57. The cause was described as "the disease of addiction".

In February 2018, it was announced that a documentary film on the late former Faith No More frontman Chuck Mosley had begun production; titled Thanks. And Sorry: The Chuck Mosley Movie, the film is being directed and edited by Drew Fortier and produced by Douglas Esper.

=== Failed reunion (2019–2025) ===
On November 23, 2019, Faith No More updated its official website and social media accounts with an image of the band's eight-pointed star logo in front of a snow-covered mountain top, accompanied by a clock counting down to November 26, 2019; on the latter date, the band announced its first shows in five years set to take place in Europe in June 2020, including Sunstroke Festival in Ireland, Hellfest in France and Tons of Rock in Norway. That week, the band also added a date at the Mad Cool festival in Madrid, Spain, scheduled for July 2020. Most of the dates, including the Australian and European legs, were moved to 2021 because of the COVID-19 pandemic. The band was scheduled to play two shows at the Banc of California Stadium in Los Angeles with System of a Down, Helmet and Russian Circles, first scheduled for May 22–23, 2020 and then postponed twice due to the pandemic. In September 2021, Patton canceled all upcoming shows, citing mental health reasons.

In a 2022 interview with The Guardian, Patton disclosed that he had not spoken to the members of Faith No More since the initial show cancellations, leaving the band's future in question. In October 2024, keyboardist Roddy Bottum stated that Faith No More was on a "semi-permanent hiatus". Bordin confirmed in an April 2025 podcast interview that Patton was "clearly unwilling to do shows with" the band, due to his commitments with Mr. Bungle. In October 2025, Bottum reiterated doubts over another Faith No More reunion, clarifying: "I don't think anyone's sort of up for it at this point. We had a bunch of shows that we were gonna play, and they got canceled, just for various reasons. But I don't think the course that we were on has fixed itself."

=== Return to touring (2026–present) ===
On June 16, 2026, Faith No More posted a photo of their logo with the text "2027" and signed a deal with Brazilian concert promoter 30e. The next day, bassist Billy Gould confirmed that the band was planning to tour in 2027. In July 2026, Faith No More confirmed an Australian and New Zealand tour supporting System of a Down with the live gigs planned in January and February 2027.

On November 10, 2026, Faith No More announced that guitarist Trey Spruance (who played on King for a Day... Fool for a Lifetime) was rejoining the band for the 2027 tour.

== Musical style and influences ==
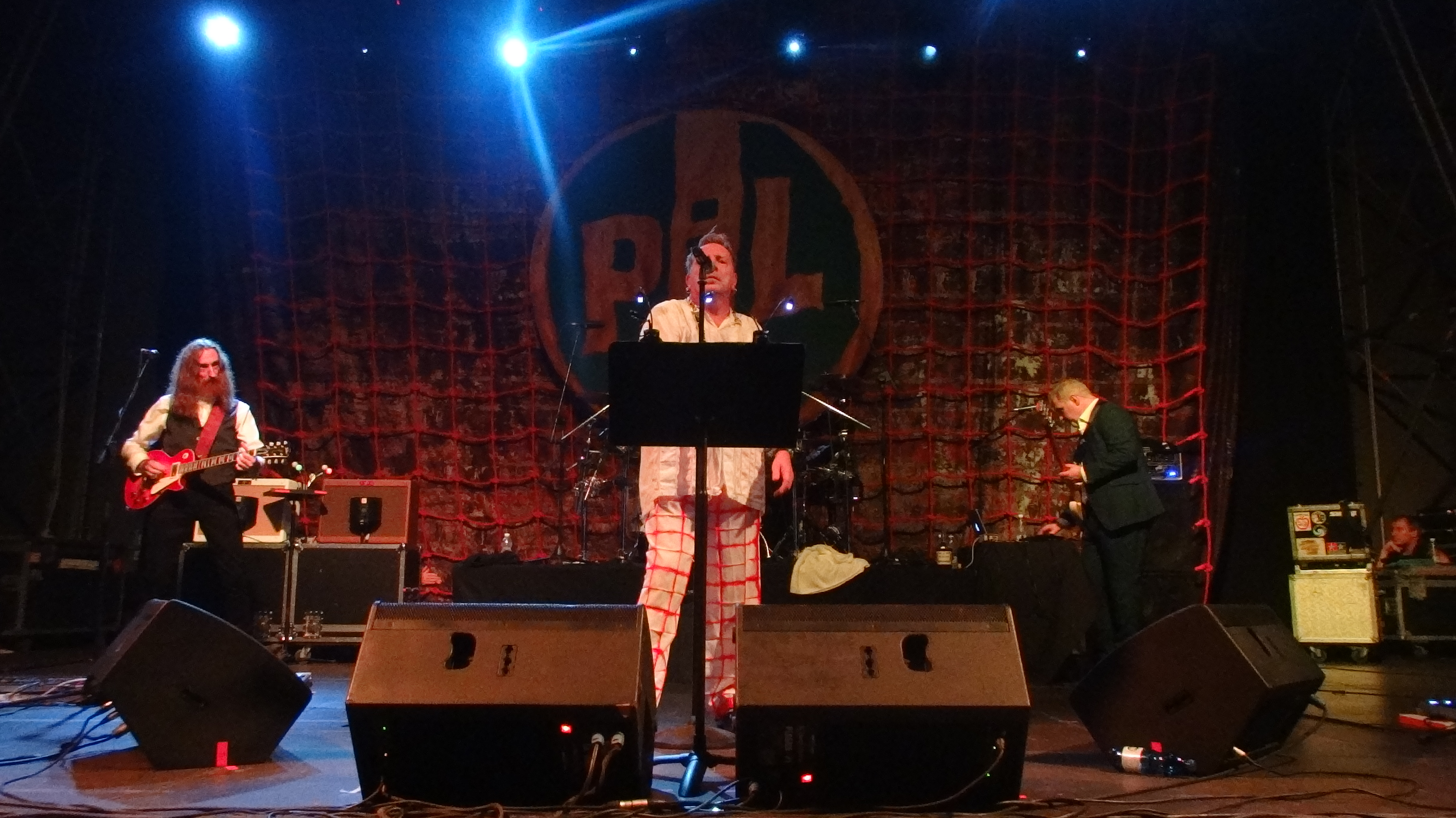
Faith No More's music was compared to English rock band Public Image Ltd

Faith No More's music is generally considered to be alternative metal, experimental rock, funk metal, alternative rock, and rap metal. As Faith. No Man., their sound was described as post-punk. The band's first single from 1983, "Quiet in Heaven/Song of Liberty", was labelled as a "solid post-punk/pre-goth single". These elements endured during their tenure with Chucky Mosley, with AllMusic comparing their first album to early Public Image Ltd works. By the mid-1980s, Billy Gould stated the band were in a "weird spot", as their eclectic sound didn't fit in with the burgeoning hardcore punk and alternative rock movements of the era.

Upon Mike Patton's arrival in 1988, the band began to expand their sound range even further, merging disparate genres such as synth-pop, thrash metal, and carousel music on The Real Thing. Rolling Stone states that by 1997, the band were "too heavy for the post-grunge pop hits of The Verve and Third Eye Blind [and] too arty to work comfortably with the nu metal knuckle-draggers they spawned." Over the course of their career, they have experimented with heavy metal, funk, hip-hop, progressive rock, alternative rock, hardcore punk, polka, country, easy listening, jazz, samba, ska, bossa nova, hard rock, pop, soul, trip hop, gospel, and lounge music.

Faith No More's lyrics have been described as "bizarrely humorous". When interviewed about his lyrics, Patton responded, "I think that too many people think too much about my lyrics. I am more a person who works more with the sound of a word than with its meaning. Often I just choose the words because of the rhythm, not because of the meaning."

In addition to the band's subsequently more apparent metal influences, like Black Sabbath and Ozzy Osbourne, Bordin acknowledged many gothic rock and post-punk bands as early influences, including Siouxsie and the Banshees, The Cure, Psychedelic Furs, Echo and the Bunnymen, Killing Joke, Public Image Ltd, and Theatre of Hate. Upon reforming, Faith No More returned to these influences on Sol Invictus.

== Legacy ==
In a 2015 article by Artistdirect, the musicians Duff McKagan, Chino Moreno, Serj Tankian, Corey Taylor, Max Cavalera and Jonathan Davis all praised the band for their significance and influence. Nirvana bassist, and co-founder, Krist Novoselic cited Faith No More as a band that "paved the way for Nirvana" in the late 1980s. Robert Plant, singer of Led Zeppelin, mentioned the then Chuck Mosley-led Faith No More as one of his favorite bands in a 1988 interview with Rolling Stone. Plant and Faith No More subsequently toured together following The Real Thing's release. Scott Ian of Anthrax has also named Faith No More as one of his favorite bands. Alexander Julien of Vision Eternel named Faith No More as his favorite band in numerous interviews and has listed it as a major influence on his music. In interviews with The PRP, Mushroomhead, Lostprophets, The Dillinger Escape Plan, American Head Charge, Dog Fashion Disco, Grüvis Malt, and Vex Red each listed Faith No More as a major influence. The Fierce and the Dead have cited them as a key influence. Primus has also acknowledged Faith No More as one of their main influences.

Corey Taylor (frontman for both Slipknot and Stone Sour) told Loudwire in 2015 that if it wasn't for Faith No More, he "wouldn't be here today." While recovering from an attempted suicide at his grandmother's house, he saw the band perform "Epic" live on the 1990 MTV Video Music Awards and the performance inspired him to begin writing and performing music again.

They were voted No. 52 on VH1's "100 Greatest Artists of Hard Rock". The band is credited for inventing the alternative metal genre which began in the 1980s and that fuses metal with other genres, including alternative rock. Tim Grierson of About.com said the band "helped put alternative metal on the map." Faith No More has also been credited for influencing nu metal bands, such as Limp Bizkit, Korn, and Sevendust, primarily due to the popularity of "Epic", and other early material that featured rap and rock crossovers. Papa Roach vocalist Jacoby Shaddix, a self-confessed fan of the band, stated in a 2015 interview "They fused some of that hip-hop and rock together. They were one of the earliest bands to do that, and definitely pioneers to a whole genre. If you listen to Korn, if you listen to how the bass and the drums lock up, it's quite similar to how Faith No More was doing it in their early years." Papa Roach guitarist Jerry Horton also listed Faith No More as a major influence when the band was starting out. In a 2019 interview on the Australian channel Rage's Midnight Show, Tobias Forge, leader of the Swedish rock band Ghost, explained what the band meant to him by saying, "In the 90s there were a few bands that I liked a lot, and still like to this day, that are consecutively hard to niche. One band is Faith No More. Who knows what they play? No one knows really. It's a synth band? No. Is it a heavy metal band? No, not really. It's just a really, really good rock band."

The band and their 1990^{[note1]} single "Epic" have frequently been cited as an example of a 1980s or 1990s one-hit wonder. The band's record Album of the Year experienced high sales in countries such as Australia (where it went Platinum), New Zealand and Germany, while being deemed a commercial failure in their native US.

=== Covers and tributes ===
Faith No More have been covered by prominent metal acts such as 36 Crazyfists, Apocalyptica, Atreyu, Between the Buried and Me, Disturbed, Five Finger Death Punch, Helloween, Ill Niño, Korn, Machine Head, Papa Roach, Redemption, Revocation, Sentenced, Slaves on Dope and Trail of Tears. Slaves on Dope wrote and recorded the song "No More Faith" as a tribute to Faith No More; they also chose to record a cover of "War Pigs" because Faith No More had done it.

In October 2000, a tribute album organized by Faith No More's former manager Warren Entner was first announced. It was set to feature principally high-profile nu-metal and alternative metal bands, including Papa Roach (covering "The Gentle Art of Making Enemies"), Korn (covering "Surprise! You're Dead!"), Disturbed (covering "Midlife Crisis"), Taproot (covering "Ricochet"), Deftones (covering "RV"), Primer 55 (covering "Digging the Grave"), System of a Down (covering "Cuckoo for Caca"), as well as Fear Factory, Slipknot, Incubus, and Slaves on Dope. Though several of the bands recorded their songs, a record label was never set and this tribute was never released. Papa Roach notably performed "The Gentle Art of Making Enemies" during its 2001 European tour, while Disturbed performed "Midlife Crisis" on its 2001 North American headlining tour. In reaction to the news of this Various Artists tribute, Patton posted the following on his Ipecac Recordings website on February 20, 2001: "FNM Tribute Record - ZZZZZZZZZZZZZZZ Who cares? Do you really want to hear bands ruin great songs? Mike's reaction...... "let sleeping dogs lie"" In a July 2003 interview with CounterCulture, when asked about this tribute Patton responded "No idea. Don't really care as long as I get my cut."

In 2002, another tribute album, titled Tribute of the Year: A Tribute to Faith No More (a reference to Faith No More's Album of the Year), was released compiled by Legion Records and released by Underground Inc. It features 30 Faith No More songs covered by mostly underground and independent hardcore punk, industrial, and alternative metal acts, including Hate Dept., Tub Ring, Bile, and Yellow No. 5.

In 2023, The Lucid along with Violent J (Insane Clown Posse) released a re-imagining of "Epic" titled "Sweet Toof"; keeping the music unchanged but re-writing all lyrics and vocal melodies except for a callback to the original chorus during the outro.

=== Feud with the Red Hot Chili Peppers ===
After the release of The Real Thing, a feud developed between Faith No More and fellow funk-influenced Californian group Red Hot Chili Peppers, with whom they had played on The Uplift Mofo Party Tour while Chuck Mosley was still Faith No More's lead singer. Patton and the Chili Peppers' frontman Anthony Kiedis were the focus of a long-running dispute, after the latter accused him of imitating his mannerisms and image in the band's music video for "Epic". The feud between the pair can also be attributed to a 1990 interview that Kiedis gave to Kerrang! magazine, where he said, "My drummer says he's gonna kidnap [Patton], shave his hair off and cut off one of his feet, just so he'll be forced to find a style of his own. Especially in the UK where FNM is much better known than us. In America, it's a different story, people are aware of the profound influence we had on them." In response, Patton said Faith No More and the Chili Peppers were "not threatened by each other, because [FNM's] music is really a lot different" and the "similarities are there in a superficial way". Referring to Kiedis' comments, Patton himself admitted, "I got a real big kick out of it to tell you the truth. I mean, if he's gonna talk about me in interviews, that's fine – it's free press! It's pretty out of line. Either he's feeling inadequate or old."

Over the years, media coverage – including from TV personalities such as Greg Gutfeld – often exaggerated tensions between the two bands. Despite this, members of both bands have said they remain on good terms. In a 1996 interview, Chili Peppers bassist Flea said, "There was never any fight between us, that was a bunch of bullshit created by the media. I mean I think they're a good band. Maybe there was some things said between Anthony and the singer [Patton], but it all means nothing to me. [...] Those guys in the band are nice people and there's no fight, let's not fight." At a 2014 show in Brooklyn, Red Hot Chili Peppers also notably covered part of the Mosley-era song "We Care a Lot".

== Concert tours ==
- 1979–1984: Early shows
- 1985–1986: We Care a Lot Tour
- 1987–1988: Introduce Yourself Tour
- 1989–1991: The Real Thing Tour
  - 1989: Damaged Justice Tour (North American leg from September 3, 1989)
- 1992–1993: Angel Dust Tour
  - 1992: Use Your Illusion Tour (European leg)
  - 1992: Guns N' Roses/Metallica Stadium Tour (July 17-removed September 21)
- 1995: King for a Day Tour
- 1997–1998: Album of the Year Tour
- 2009–2012: The Second Coming Tour
- 2015: Soundwave Tour
- 2015: Sol Invictus Tour
- 2027: Australian and European Tour

== Band members ==
=== Current members ===
- Mike Bordin – drums, percussion (1979–1998, 2009–2021, 2026–present)
- Billy Gould – bass, backing vocals (1979–1998, 2009–2021, 2026–present)
- Roddy Bottum – keyboards, rhythm guitar, backing vocals (1983–1998, 2009–2021, 2026–present)
- Mike Patton – lead vocals (1988–1998, 2009–2021, 2026–present)
- Trey Spruance – lead guitar (1993–1995, 2026–present) (Note: Live guest appearance in 2011.)

=== Key former members ===
- Chuck Mosley – lead vocals (1984–1988); died 2017 (Note: Live guest appearances in 2010, 2015, and 2016.)
- Jim Martin – lead guitar, backing vocals (1984–1993)
- Dean Menta – lead guitar (1995–1996)
- Jon Hudson – lead guitar, backing vocals (1996–1998, 2009–2021)

== Awards and nominations ==
Brit Awards

Year	Nominee / work	Award	Result
1991	Faith No More	International Group	Nominated

Grammy Awards

Year	Nominee / work	Award	Result
1990	"The Real Thing"	Best Metal Performance	Nominated
1991	"Epic"	Best Hard Rock Performance	Nominated
1993	"Angel Dust"	Best Hard Rock Performance	Nominated

Metal Hammer Golden Gods Awards

Year	Nominee / work	Award	Result
2015	Sol Invictus	Best Album	Won

Metal Storm Awards

Year	Nominee / work	Award	Result
2015	Sol Invictus	Best Alternative Metal Album	Won

MTV Video Music Awards

Year	Nominee / work	Award	Result
1990	"Epic"	Best Heavy Metal/Hard Rock Video	Nominated
1991	"Falling to Pieces"	Best Art Direction in a Video	Nominated
1991	"Falling to Pieces"	Best Heavy Metal/Hard Rock Video	Nominated
1991	"Falling to Pieces"	Best Visual Effects in a Video	Won
1993	"A Small Victory"	Best Art Direction in a Video	Nominated

== Discography ==
Studio albums

- We Care a Lot (1985)
- Introduce Yourself (1987)
- The Real Thing (1989)
- Angel Dust (1992)
- King for a Day... Fool for a Lifetime (1995)
- Album of the Year (1997)
- Sol Invictus (2015)

== See also ==
- List of alternative metal artists
- List of bands from the San Francisco Bay Area
- List of funk metal and funk rock bands

== Notes ==
1. The song was recorded in 1988 and first appeared on 1989's The Real Thing, although it gained popularity after being released as a single in 1990.

== Bibliography ==
- Chirazi, Steffan (1994). Faith No More: The Real Story. Penguin USA. ISBN 1-8981411-5-0.
- Prato, Greg (2013). The Faith No More & Mr. Bungle Companion. Createspace. ISBN 1-4936966-6-1.
- Harte, Adrian (2018). Small Victories: The True Story of Faith No More. Jawbone Press. ISBN 1-9110363-7-8.
