= Ricochet (Faith No More song) =

Single by Faith No More

from the album King for a Day... Fool for a Lifetime
- Released: May 1, 1995
- Studio: Bearsville (Bearsville, New York)
- Genre: Progressive rock
- Length: 4:28
- Label: Slash
- Songwriters: Mike Bordin; Roddy Bottum; Billy Gould; Mike Patton
- Producers: Andy Wallace; Faith No More

Faith No More singles chronology
"Digging the Grave" (1995)	"Ricochet" (1995)	"Evidence" (1995)

"Ricochet" is a 1995 single by Faith No More, taken from their fifth studio album King for a Day... Fool for a Lifetime. Produced by Andy Wallace in the Bearsville Studios, the song was borne out of a period of transition for the group, who had recently fired their previous guitar player Jim Martin, and were dealing with the absence of keyboard player Roddy Bottum, who was grieving the death of his friend Kurt Cobain.

Released on May 1, 1995, "Ricochet" was accompanied by a music video filmed in Paris. The single charted in Australia, Scotland, and the United Kingdom, including a number-one position on the UK Rock and Metal chart. The single has been positively received by music critics, particularly for its pithy, sarcastic lyrics.

== Production ==
"Ricochet" was recorded as part of the King for a Day... Fool for a Lifetime session in Bearsville Studios, in Bearsville, New York; the record was the first Faith No More album not recorded in their native Northern California. Bass player Billy Gould described the remote location of the studio as a form of "sensory deprivation". Writing and rehearsing the songs for the album took eight to nine months, although half of this time was also spent finding a replacement for guitar player Jim Martin, who had been fired from the band following the release of Angel Dust in 1992. Martin had grown dissatisfied with the band's change in musical direction, which had grown increasingly less guitar-based. Mr. Bungle guitarist Trey Spruance was brought in for the recording session. Spruance left the band before the subsequent tour, and was replaced by keyboard roadie Dean Menta.

The recording session took roughly three months, for which the band hired producer Andy Wallace, who had previously worked with Sonic Youth, Nirvana and Slayer. Bottum claimed the combination of Wallace and Spruance as two new influences helped to create "a real up-in-the-air, what the fuck is gonna happen kind of feel" while recording. In addition to the band's lineup changes, Roddy Bottum claims to have been mostly absent during this period, owing to the deaths of both his father and Kurt Cobain, whose wife Courtney Love was a close friend of Bottum. In addition to this, Bottum had developed a heroin addiction, and his absence led to a dearth of keyboard parts on the songs recorded during this time. "Ricochet" was the last song completed during the recording sessions, and was initially earmarked as a B-side rather than an album track; it was included on the record at drummer Mike Bordin's insistence.

== Release ==
"Ricochet" was released on May 1, 1995. The single was accompanied by a music video, consisting of backstage and concert footage recorded in the Élysée Montmartre in Paris. The video was directed by Alex Hemming, and produced by Derin Schelsinger. "Ricochet" was included on the soundtrack for the 1996 video game Fox Hunt.

The single charted modestly in several countries, reaching number 57 in Australia, number 29 in Scotland, and number 27 in the United Kingdom. It topped the UK Rock and Metal chart, and reached a position of 83 in the European Hot 100 Singles chart.

== Reception ==
In reviewing King for a Day... Fool for a Lifetime, Rolling Stone magazine described "Ricochet" as being one of the album's "best cuts", calling it "a portentous anthem" comparable to their 1990 single "Epic". Both the San Francisco Chronicle and New York magazine praised the song's lyrics, the former describing them as "enigmatic, sarcastic, provocative and incisive". A retrospective overview of Faith No More's career by Consequence described it as being "distraught in its cynicism and mockery in all the right ways". Writing for Record Collector, Alun Hamnett picked out the song's simple arrangement, calling it a "matchless slab of melodic rock which despite [its] obvious pith, benefit[s] from a welcoming, sumptuous sound". Chris Conaton of PopMatters called the song a "dark, dramatic rocker [...] which builds slowly from crashing chords and sparse verses". Conaton singled out the chorus—"it's always funny until someone gets hurt / and then it's just hilarious"—as being "one of the band’s most memorable lines".

== Charts ==
Weekly chart performance for "Ricochet"
Chart (1995)	Peak position
Australia (ARIA Singles Chart)	57
Europe (Eurochart Hot 100)	83
Scotland Singles (OCC)	29
UK Singles (OCC)	27
UK Rock & Metal (OCC)	1

== Footnotes ==
=== References ===
- Harte, Adrian (2018). Small Victories: The True Story of Faith No More. Jawbone Press. ISBN 978-1911036371.
