= Digging the Grave =

1995 single by Faith No More

Single by Faith No More

from the album King for a Day... Fool for a Lifetime
- B-side: "I Started a Joke"; "Absolute Zero"; "Greenfields"
- Released: February 27, 1995
- Studio: Bearsville (Bearsville, New York)
- Genre: Punk rock
- Length: 3:04
- Label: Slash
- Songwriters: Mike Bordin; Roddy Bottum; Billy Gould; Mike Patton
- Producers: Andy Wallace; Faith No More

Faith No More singles chronology
"Another Body Murdered" (1993)	"Digging the Grave" (1995)	"Ricochet" (1995)

Music video
- "Digging the Grave" on YouTube

"Digging the Grave" is a 1995 single by Faith No More, from their fifth studio album, King for a Day... Fool for a Lifetime. Produced by Andy Wallace in the Bearsville Studios, the song was born out of a period of transition for the group, as they were dealing with the absence of keyboard player Roddy Bottum—who was grieving the deaths of his father and of friend Kurt Cobain—and had recently fired their previous guitar player Jim Martin.

Released on February 27, 1995, "Digging the Grave" charted internationally, making top 20 appearances across Europe, Australia and New Zealand, but was unsuccessful in the United States. The song has been well-received by music critics in both contemporary and retrospective reviews, often citing its dark or aggressive tone.

== Production ==
"Digging the Grave" was recorded as part of the King for a Day... Fool for a Lifetime session in Bearsville Studios, in Woodstock, New York; the record was the first Faith No More album not to be recorded in their native Northern California. Bass player Billy Gould described the remote location of the studio as a form of "sensory deprivation". Writing and rehearsing the songs for the album took eight to nine months, although half of this time was also spent finding a replacement for guitar player Jim Martin, who had been fired from the band following the release of Angel Dust in 1992. Martin's departure was linked to dissatisfaction with the band's decreased focus on a guitar-based sound. Mr. Bungle guitarist Trey Spruance was brought in for the recording session. Spruance left the band before the subsequent tour, and was replaced by keyboard roadie Dean Menta.

The recording session took roughly three months. The band hired producer Andy Wallace, who had previously worked with Sonic Youth, Nirvana and Slayer. Bottum claimed the combination of Wallace and Spruance as two new influences helped to create "a real up-in-the-air, what the fuck is gonna happen kind of feel" while recording. In addition to the band's lineup changes, Bottum claims to have been mostly absent during this period, owing to the deaths of both his father and Kurt Cobain, whose wife Courtney Love was a close friend of Bottum's. In addition to this, Bottum had developed a heroin addiction, and his absence lead to a dearth of keyboard parts on the songs recorded during this time. Drummer Mike Bordin has described the composition of "Digging the Grave" as attempting to recreate the sounds of the band's first two albums, "but tighter, faster, and harder".

== Release ==
Released on February 27, 1995, the single was accompanied by a music video directed by Marcus Raboy, and filmed in San Francisco, California. The video was featured on the television series Beavis and Butt-Head, but the single failed to chart in the United States. The band also performed the song on two episodes of the UK series Top of the Pops in March 1995.

Despite its underperformance in the United States, "Digging the Grave" charted elsewhere in the world, peaking in the top 20 in the singles charts of Australia, Finland, Ireland, New Zealand, Norway, Scotland, and the UK. It also reached number 23 in France, number 48 in Germany, and number 39 in Sweden, and number 42 in Switzerland. In the UK, the song topped the UK Rock and Metal chart.

== Reception ==
"MTV’s animated ‘90s icons Beavis and Butt-head famously savaged this song saying, “New sound? They sound just like everybody else!” But there’s more energy in this single than many of their 1995-era contemporaries managed on entire albums."

— Chris Conaton of PopMatters on "Digging the Grave"

In a contemporary review of King for a Day... Fool for a Lifetime, Anthony Violanti of The Buffalo News described the song as a "power pop masterpiece"; while CMJ New Music Monthly compared it to the sound of AC/DC, adding that it "offers hooks lurking deep within the miasma". Rolling Stone's Al Weisel highlighted it as one of the best songs on the album, describing it as having "a grungy feel that isn't completely ruined by Patton's histrionic screaming". A retrospective overview of Faith No More's career by Consequence called it a "a definitive left-field release", describing it as "raw, aggressive, altogether creepy". Writing for The Quietus, Dave McNamee considered the song one of King for a Day... Fool for a Lifetime's more accessible and straightforward entries, but added that it "proves that when Faith No More do ‘ordinary’ they still do it with a million more unexpected catchy twists and malevolent breakdowns than anything one-note imitators [...] could dream of". Chris Conaton of PopMatters called the song "a breath of fresh air", noting that its straightforward rock sound was refreshing given its placement on the album.

== Charts ==
Weekly chart performance for "Digging the Grave"
Chart (1995)	Peak position
Australia (ARIA)	12
Europe (Eurochart Hot 100)	20
Finland (Suomen virallinen lista)	5
France (SNEP)	23
Germany (GfK)	48
Ireland (IRMA)	12
New Zealand (Recorded Music NZ)	16
Norway (VG-lista)	11
Scottish Singles Sales (Official Charts)	18
Sweden (Sverigetopplistan)	39
Switzerland (Schweizer Hitparade)	42
UK Singles (Official Charts)	16
UK Rock & Metal (Official Charts)	1

== Footnotes ==
=== References ===
- Harte, Adrian (2018). Small Victories: The True Story of Faith No More. Jawbone Press. ISBN 978-1911036371.
