= Evidence (Faith No More song) =

1995 single by Faith No More

Single by Faith No More

from the album King for a Day... Fool for a Lifetime
- Released: May 8, 1995
- Studio: Bearsville (Bearsville, New York)
- Genre: Soul; funk; R&B; jazz
- Length: 4:53
- Label: Slash
- Songwriters: Mike Bordin; Roddy Bottum; Billy Gould; Mike Patton
- Producers: Andy Wallace; Faith No More

Faith No More singles chronology
"Ricochet" (1995)	"Evidence" (1995)	"Ashes to Ashes" (1997)

Music video
- "Evidence" on YouTube

"Evidence" is a 1995 single by Faith No More, taken from their fifth studio album, King for a Day... Fool for a Lifetime. Recorded in Bearsville Studios and produced by Andy Wallace, the song was born out of a period of transition for the group, who had recently fired their previous guitar player Jim Martin and were dealing with the absence of keyboard player Roddy Bottum, who was grieving several recent deaths.

A soul- and R&B-influenced track, "Evidence" was released as the third single from the album on May 8, 1995, and was accompanied by a music video directed by Walter Stern. Although "Evidence" did not fare well in the United States, it spent several weeks in the charts in the United Kingdom and Australia, and has subsequently been well-received by music critics.

== Production ==
"Evidence" was recorded as part of the King for a Day... Fool for a Lifetime session in Bearsville Studios, in Woodstock, New York; the record was the first Faith No More album not to be recorded in their native Northern California. Bass player Billy Gould described the remote location of the studio as a form of "sensory deprivation". Writing and rehearsing the songs for the album took eight to nine months, although half of this time was also spent finding a replacement for guitar player Jim Martin, who had been fired from the band following the release of Angel Dust in 1992. Martin had grown dissatisfied with the musical direction the band had taken, as it was becoming increasingly less guitar-based. Mr. Bungle guitarist Trey Spruance was brought in for the recording session. Spruance left the band before the subsequent tour, and was replaced by keyboard roadie Dean Menta.

The recording session took roughly three months, for which the band hired producer Andy Wallace, who had previously worked with Sonic Youth, Nirvana and Slayer. Bottum claimed the combination of Wallace and Spruance as two new influences helped to create "a real up-in-the-air, what the fuck is gonna happen kind of feel" while recording. In addition to the band's lineup changes, Roddy Bottum claims to have been mostly absent during this period, owing to the deaths of both his father and Kurt Cobain, whose wife Courtney Love was a close friend of Bottum's. In addition to this, Bottum had developed a heroin addiction, and his absence lead to a dearth of keyboard parts on the songs recorded during this time.

== Release ==
"Evidence" was the third single released from King for a Day... Fool for a Lifetime—and with the eventual cancellation of planned releases for "Take This Bottle" and "The Gentle Art of Making Enemies", would be the album's last single, It was released on May 8, 1995, and in the UK on July 17 that year. The release was accompanied by a music video, which was directed by Walter Stern and recorded in a nightclub on San Francisco's Eddy Street.

The band had made an appearance the previous April on the Australian variety show Hey Hey It's Saturday to perform the song, which peaked at number 27 in that country's chart; becoming the 29th most-played song on Australian radio that year. "Evidence" spent three weeks in the UK Singles Chart, reaching a peak position of number 32.

== Reception ==
We've always wanted to write a great pop song. [...] "Evidence" is just that. I think we needed to lose a guitarist to achieve the end result.

— Singer Mike Patton

Despite its lack of significant airplay or chart success upon release, "Evidence" has since been well-received critically. It has been described by Jeremy Allen of The Guardian as "a slick, atmospheric slab of R&B"; Allen also noted that the song appeared to be influenced by songwriter Burt Bacharach, and The Family Stand's 1990 single "Ghetto Heaven". Writing for Kerrang! magazine, Sam Law felt that "Evidence" was a "perfect showcase" of the band's eclectic influences, writing that it showed they were not hampered by the departure of former guitar player Jim Martin. Law also drew parallels between the song and the works of Bacharach. In a Faith No More discography retrospective, Metal Hammer described the song as "beautiful liquid soul", again noting that the absence of Martin did not detract from the recording.

== Personnel ==
Faith No More

- Mike Patton – vocals
- Billy Gould – bass
- Mike Bordin – drums
- Roddy Bottum – keyboard
- Trey Spruance – guitars

Additional personnel

- Eric Drooker – illustrations

== Charts ==
Weekly chart performance for "Evidence"
Chart (1995)	Peak position
Australia (ARIA)	27
Europe (Eurochart Hot 100)	48
Finland (Suomen virallinen lista)	5
Netherlands (Single Top 100)	42
New Zealand (Recorded Music NZ)	38
Scottish Singles Sales (Official Charts)	31
UK Singles (Official Charts)	32
UK Rock & Metal (Official Charts)	1

== Footnotes ==
=== References ===
- Harte, Adrian (2018). Small Victories: The True Story of Faith No More. Jawbone Press. ISBN 978-1911036371.
