= Epic (Faith No More song) =

1990 single by Faith No More

- Artwork for North American commercial cassette single; the US CD single was the promo-only release

Single by Faith No More

from the album The Real Thing
- Released: January 29, 1990
- Studio: Studio D (Sausalito, California)
- Genre: Rap metal; rap rock; funk metal; alternative metal
- Length: 4:53 (album version); 3:59 (radio remix edit)
- Label: Slash; London
- Songwriters: Mike Patton; Billy Gould; Jim Martin; Roddy Bottum; Mike Bordin
- Producer: Matt Wallace

Faith No More singles chronology
"From Out of Nowhere" (1989)	"Epic" (1990)	"Falling to Pieces" (1990)

Music video
- "Epic" on YouTube

"Epic" is a song by American rock band Faith No More. It was released as the second single from their third album, The Real Thing (1989), in 1990 in the United States and Europe. The song was the band's breakthrough hit, peaking at number nine on the US Billboard Hot 100, number seven on the US Cash Box Top 100, number two in New Zealand, and number one in Australia for three weeks. It is among the band's most popular songs and a staple in their concerts.

== Composition and musical style ==
Bassist Billy Gould said, "It was conceived naturally as a riff in the studio between Roddy, myself and Mike Bordin during rehearsal that later got fleshed out into an entire song." He also said that, after the disappointing performance of the album's first single ("From Out of Nowhere"), the record label had low expectations and let the band pick whatever song they wanted as the next music video (and thus, the next single). "So we picked 'Epic' because it just felt the most natural at the time. We had very little expectations of it becoming a commercial hit," said Gould.

The song has been labeled rap metal, rap rock, funk metal, and alternative metal.

== Music video ==
Directed by South African Ralph Ziman, the music video for "Epic" features surreal images, which are combined with performance footage of the band soaked by an artificial rainstorm on a sound stage. The final shot is of keyboardist Roddy Bottum playing the piano outro on an upright model, which explodes in slow motion after he finishes and walks away from it.

Guitarist Jim Martin was a schoolmate, close friend and fan of the late Metallica bassist Cliff Burton. In the video, he can be seen wearing a T-shirt with a photo of Cliff with the words "A Tribute to Cliff Burton". In addition, Mike Patton can be seen wearing a Mr. Bungle shirt that reads "There's A Tractor In My Balls Again".

=== Controversy ===
The video was criticised by animal rights activists, as it features a flailing fish out of water.

During an interview, the band joked that the fish seen flopping around in the music video belonged to Icelandic singer Björk, who at the time was the singer for the band The Sugarcubes, and they claimed to have stolen it from her at a party. There are also stories of Björk giving the fish to Bottum after a poetry reading in San Francisco. This was confirmed by the singer who defended the group, saying that "I know those guys, I know they wouldn't do anything to harm [him]. But I know, if I had gone home with MY fish, which was given to ME, none of this would have ever happened."

Director Ralph Ziman confirmed in 2010 that several fish were used during the filming of the video and none were out of water for very long. The fish were released following the completion of the video.

== Reception ==
"Epic" was the band's most successful single in the US and was generally well received. According to Rolling Stone, it set a standard that Faith No More did not match with its later albums. Both the Philadelphia Daily News and Los Angeles Times praised the song, citing the song as "radio-ready" and "radical", respectively. However, The New York Times also cited Faith No More as "style-crunching," using "Epic" as their example. The Village Voice's Pazz & Jop annual year-end critics' poll ranked "Epic" at number five on their poll of the best singles of 1990, tying with Lisa Stansfield's "All Around the World".

=== Legacy and covers ===
"Epic" was ranked number 30 on VH1's 40 Greatest Metal Songs. In 2009, it was ranked the 54th best hard rock song of all time by VH1 and appeared at number 46 on the Triple J Hottest 100 of All Time, an Australian music poll. Australian radio station Triple M ranked it 321st on a list of the top 400 greatest songs of all time. It was ranked by Kerrang! as the fourth best Faith No More song in 2020.

One of the earliest cover versions was done in Swedish, by hip hop act Just D and rap metal band Clawfinger. This cover was released on a limited edition promo CD in 1992 and on CD maxi single in 1993. On the first release the song was titled (Du vill ha) Allt (Men kan’te få d) and on the later release shortened to Vill ha allt. The song was subsequently covered in 2007 by the Welsh rock band The Automatic, in 2017 by Canadian rock band The Veer Union and in 2007 by the Californian metalcore band Atreyu, who included it on the bonus edition of their 2007 album Lead Sails Paper Anchor. It has also been covered in live performances by Sugar Ray and the Swedish indie pop band Love Is All. An arrangement by Mateo Messina was featured in the 2011 film Young Adult. In 2023, The Lucid along with Violent J (Insane Clown Posse) released a re-imagining of "Epic" titled "Sweet Toof"; keeping the music unchanged but re-writing all lyrics and vocal melodies except for a callback to the original chorus during the outro.

In a 2009 MTV interview, American pop singer Lady Gaga said she was a fan of the song, and used it as entrance music when she worked as a burlesque dancer.

== Track listing ==
American release This version was released in the US as a "Slash sticker" labelled 7-inch and as a cassette with a "Burning Splash" sleeve.

No.	Title	Length
1.	"Epic" (Radio remix)	3:59
2.	"Edge of the World"	4:09

Australian release The 7-inch and cassette versions of this release only had tracks 1 and 2, unlike the 12-inch which featured all 3.

No.	Title	Length
1.	"Epic"	4:51
2.	"The Morning After"	3:44
3.	"We Care a Lot" (Live at Brixton)	3:50

UK and international release The initial release of "Epic", released in the UK, Germany, Japan and internationally. The 7-inch editions only had tracks one, two, and occasionally three. Track five was exclusive to Japanese issues.

No.	Title	Length
1.	"Epic"	4:54
2.	"War Pigs" (Live in Berlin on November 9, 1989)	8:02
3.	"Surprise! You're Dead!" (Live at Octagon Center, Sheffield, UK, January 1, 1990)	2:52
4.	"Chinese Arithmetic"^{[A]}" ((Live at Sheffield))	4:16
5.	"Epic" ((Live)^{[B]} (Japanese bonus track))	4:28

UK and international reissue Reissue version of the single "Epic". The 7-inch vinyl and cassette versions only had the first two tracks.

No.	Title	Length
1.	"Epic"	4:51
2.	"Falling to Pieces" (Live at Brixton)	4:45
3.	"Epic" (Live at Brixton)	4:55
4.	"As the Worm Turns" (Live at Brixton)	2:46

== Personnel ==
Personnel are sourced from Mix.

- Mike Bordin – drums
- Roddy Bottum – E-mu Emax keyboard, piano
- Billy Gould – bass, E-mu Emax keyboard
- James Martin – guitar
- Mike Patton – vocals

== Charts ==
=== Weekly charts ===
Chart (1989–1990)	Peak position
Australia (ARIA)	1
Canada Top Singles (RPM)	19
Europe (Eurochart Hot 100)	67
Ireland (IRMA)	27
Netherlands (Single Top 100)	51
New Zealand (Recorded Music NZ)	2
UK Singles (Official Charts)	25
US Billboard Hot 100	9
US Mainstream Rock (Billboard)	25
US Cash Box Top 100	7

=== Year-end charts ===
Chart (1990)	Position
Australia (ARIA)	22
New Zealand (RIANZ)	5
US Billboard Hot 100	75

== Certifications ==
Region	Certification	Certified units/sales
Australia (ARIA)	Platinum	70,000^{^}
New Zealand (RMNZ)	Platinum	30,000^{‡}
United Kingdom (BPI)	Silver	200,000^{‡}
United States (RIAA)	Gold	500,000^{^}
^{^} Shipments figures based on certification alone.^{‡} Sales+streaming figures based on certification alone.

== Release history ==
Region	Date	Format(s)	Label(s)	Ref(s).
United Kingdom	January 29, 1990	7-inch vinyl; 12-inch vinyl; CD	Slash; London	
United Kingdom (re-release)	August 28, 1990	7-inch vinyl; 12-inch vinyl; CD; cassette	Slash; London	
Japan	November 10, 1990	CD	Slash; London	

== Notes ==
- ^[A] Includes ad-lib from "It Takes Two" by Rob Base and DJ EZ-Rock.
- ^[B] Recorded in Norwich, 1990. Broadcast by The BBC Radio 1 "Rockshow", March 2, 1990. The profanity is obscured and the songs fade out.
