= List of Faith No More band members =

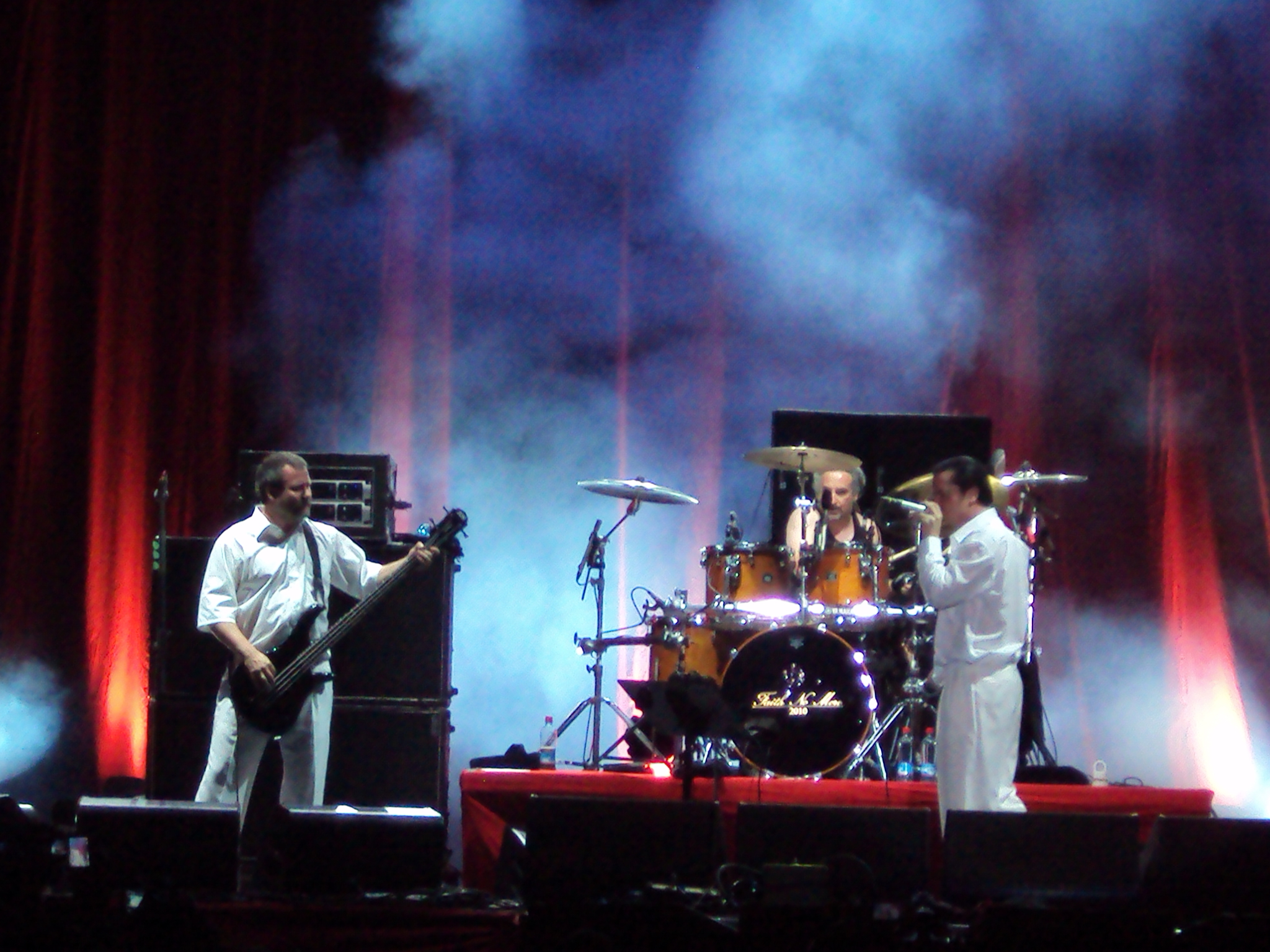
Faith No More in 2010

American alternative metal band Faith No More has had fourteen band members, many for such a short period of time they were not documented, including: five vocalists, eight guitarists, as well as two keyboardists; one drummer; and one bassist.

The band, consisting of Mike Morris, Billy Gould, Wade Worthington, and Mike Bordin, first formed in 1979 under the name "Faith. No Man.", recording just one release. Wade left shortly afterward and was replaced by Roddy Bottum. In 1982 the band, minus Mike Morris, quit to form Faith No More. During this time they went through the majority of their long list of vocalists and guitarists, Courtney Love being the third and longest-standing vocalist at the time. They then settled on Chuck Mosley and Jim Martin, with whom they recorded and released their first two studio albums, We Care a Lot and Introduce Yourself. After the tour for Introduce Yourself the band fired Mosley and hired Mike Patton from the then-underground experimental rock band Mr. Bungle. This was Faith No More's longest-standing lineup and featured the most releases, including the studio albums The Real Thing and Angel Dust. Following the departure of Jim Martin in late 1993 the band went without a guitarist until starting the writing of the follow-up to Angel Dust, King for a Day... Fool for a Lifetime, for which they hired Trey Spruance, also of Mr. Bungle. Spruance left before the tour and was replaced by Dean Menta. Menta was then replaced by Jon Hudson before the recording of the band's final album, Album of the Year. Faith No More split up in 1998.

In February 2009, Faith No More announced they would be re-forming for a European tour that began in June in Brixton Academy, London, and then Download Festival in Donington Park. This lineup, identical to the final one prior to the band's 1998 breakup, would remain in place until 2021 when the band went into an extended hiatus, seemingly confirmed to be an official breakup by singer Mike Patton in February 2026.

Faith No More would announce a second reunion less than four months later, confirming Trey Spruance to have rejoined the lineup in place of Jon Hudson.

== Members ==
=== Current members ===
Image	Name	Years active	Instruments	Release contributions
	Mike Bordin	1979–1998; 2009–present	drums; percussion; backing vocals (1987)	All releases
	Billy Gould	1979–1998; 2009–present	bass; backing vocals; keyboard (1988–1989); guitars (1993–1994)	All releases
	Roddy Bottum	1983–1998; 2009–present	keyboards; guitars; backing vocals	All releases except "Quiet in Heaven", "Song of Liberty" (1982)
	Mike Patton	1988–1998; 2009–present	lead vocals	All releases since The Real Thing (1989)
	Trey Spruance	1993–1995; 2026–present	guitars	King for a Day... Fool for a Lifetime (1995)

=== Former members ===
Image	Name	Years active	Instruments	Release contributions
	Mike Morris	1979–1983	lead vocals; guitars	"Quiet in Heaven", "Song of Liberty" (1982) (as Faith. No Man.)
	Wade Worthington	1979–1983	keyboards; backing vocals	"Quiet in Heaven", "Song of Liberty" (1982) (as Faith. No Man.)
	Jake Smith	1983	guitars	none
	Joe Callahan	1983	vocals	none
	Paula Frazer	1984	vocals	none
	Courtney Love	1984	vocals	none
	Mark Bowen	1984	guitars	none
	Jim Martin	1984–1993	guitars; backing vocals	All releases from We Care a Lot (1985) to Angel Dust (1992)
	Chuck Mosley	1984–1988 (guest; 2010, 2015, 2016) (died 2017)	lead vocals	We Care a Lot (1985); Introduce Yourself (1987)
	Dean Menta	1995–1996	guitars	King for a Day single b-sides
	Jon Hudson	1996–1998; 2009–2021	guitars; backing vocals	Album of the Year (1997); Sol Invictus (2015)

== Line-ups ==
Period	Members	Releases
1979–1983	Mike Morris – lead vocals, guitars; Wade Worthington – keyboards, backing vocals; Billy Gould – bass; Mike Bordin – drums	"Quiet in Heaven", "Song of Liberty" (1982) (as Faith. No Man.)
1983	Mike Morris – lead vocals, guitars; Roddy Bottum – keyboards; Billy Gould – bass; Mike Bordin – drums	
1983	Joe Callahan – vocals; Jake Smith – guitars; Roddy Bottum – keyboards; Billy Gould – bass; Mike Bordin – drums	
1983–1984	Roddy Bottum – keyboards; Billy Gould – bass; Mike Bordin – drums	
1984	Mark Bowen – guitars; Roddy Bottum – keyboards; Billy Gould – bass; Mike Bordin – drums	
1984	Paula Frazer – lead vocals; Mark Bowen – guitars; Roddy Bottum – keyboards, backing vocals; Billy Gould – bass; Mike Bordin – drums	
1984	Courtney Love – lead vocals; Mark Bowen – guitars; Roddy Bottum – keyboards, backing vocals; Billy Gould – bass; Mike Bordin – drums	
1984–1988	Chuck Mosley – lead vocals; Jim Martin – guitars, backing vocals; Roddy Bottum – keyboards, backing vocals; Billy Gould – bass, backing vocals; Mike Bordin – drums, backing vocals	We Care a Lot (1985); Introduce Yourself (1987)
1988–1993	Mike Patton – lead vocals; Jim Martin – guitar, backing vocals; Roddy Bottum – keyboards, backing vocals, guitars; Billy Gould – bass, backing vocals; Mike Bordin – drums	The Real Thing (1989); Angel Dust (1992); Live at the Brixton Academy (1991)
1993	Mike Patton – lead vocals; Billy Gould – bass, guitars, backing vocals; Roddy Bottum – keyboards, backing vocals, guitars; Mike Bordin – drums	
1993–1995	Mike Patton – lead vocals; Trey Spruance – guitars; Billy Gould – bass, backing vocals; Roddy Bottum – keyboards, backing vocals, guitars; Mike Bordin – drums	King for a Day... Fool for a Lifetime (1995)
1995–1996	Mike Patton – lead vocals; Dean Menta – guitars; Roddy Bottum – keyboards, backing vocals, guitars; Billy Gould – bass, backing vocals; Mike Bordin – drums	
1996–1998	Mike Patton – lead vocals; Jon Hudson – guitars; Roddy Bottum – keyboards, backing vocals, guitars; Billy Gould – bass, backing vocals; Mike Bordin – drums	Album of the Year (1997)
Disbanded 1998–2009
2009–present	Mike Patton – lead vocals; Jon Hudson – guitars, backing vocals; Roddy Bottum – keyboards, backing vocals, guitar; Billy Gould – bass, backing vocals; Mike Bordin – drums	Sol Invictus (2015)
