= ABJ =

ABJ may refer to:

- ABJ (motorcycle), a 1950s bike built by AB Jackson Cycles of Birmingham, England
- Abaeté Linhas Aéreas, Brazilian airline (ICAO code ABJ)
- Adler–Bell–Jackiw anomaly, in theoretical physics
- Aka-Bea language (ISO 639 code "abj")
- Anything But Joey, a pop-rock band
- Bachelor of Arts in Journalism, a degree
- Félix-Houphouët-Boigny International Airport in District of Abidjan, Ivory Coast (IATA airport code ABJ)

== See also ==
- AB (disambiguation)
- BJ (disambiguation)
