= Anne's Song =

- Artwork for UK single release

Single by Faith No More

from the album Introduce Yourself
- Released: April 1988
- Recorded: 1986
- Studio: Studio D (Sausalito, California)
- Length: 4:46
- Label: Slash
- Composer: Faith No More
- Lyricist: Chuck Mosley
- Producers: Matt Wallace; Steve Berlin

Faith No More singles chronology
"We Care a Lot" (1988)	"Anne's Song" (1988)	"From out of Nowhere" (1990)

Music video
- "Anne's Song" on YouTube

"Anne's Song" is a song by American rock band Faith No More, released in April 1988 as the third and final single from their second studio album, Introduce Yourself (1987). Written by the band, the song describes an acquaintance of theirs from New York, and her circle of friends. The single was produced by Matt Wallace and Steve Berlin and released by Slash Records, but failed to chart.

"Anne's Song" was released alongside a music video directed by Tamra Davis, which featured both the eponymous Anne and an appearance by Metallica member James Hetfield. The song has met with critical appreciation in later years, drawing comparisons to David Bowie and Tom Tom Club.

== Production ==
"Anne's Song" was recorded in 1986 as part of the Introduce Yourself recording sessions, at Studio D in Sausalito, California. The recordings were produced by Matt Wallace and by Steve Berlin of Slash Records. Wallace had worked with the band on their debut studio album, We Care a Lot (1985), and the earlier single, "Quiet in Heaven"/"Song of Liberty" (1983). He recalled that the more experienced Berlin, having been a member of Los Lobos and primarily accustomed to music unlike Faith No More's, essentially "babysat" the band to ensure their recording budget was not wasted.

Bassist Billy Gould said on the song's production, "we just kept playing it and playing it and, finally, the snare beat smoothed out. We always thought it would sound good on the radio."

== Composition and lyrics ==
"Anne's Song" was written by bassist Billy Gould and keyboardist Roddy Bottum, and features one of the few guitar solos in the band's canon, performed by Jim Martin. The song had existed in a "rough and ready" incarnation for several months before the recording sessions began, and had its composition completed in the studio.

The song's titular Anne is the band's friend Anne D'Angillo, whose residence in Alphabet City, Manhattan was used by the group during their previous tour; the other characters mentioned throughout the song are all real friends of D'Angillo. D'Angillo also featured in the song's music video, shot in New York and Los Angeles by director Tamra Davis; the video also featured shots of singer Chuck Mosley trapped in a cage, tormented by the other band members and Metallica vocalist James Hetfield; bass player Gould conceived of this segment, stating "my dream for that video was that I wanted to get Chuck in a cage, from which he couldn't escape, and I could poke him with a stick".

== Release and reception ==
"Anne's Song" and the accompanying music video were released in April 1988. The single was available in both seven-inch and twelve-inch formats, with the former also available as a picture disc. The video was later included on the 1999 compilation video Who Cares a Lot? The Greatest Videos; the song itself, however, was not included on the concurrently-released compilation album Who Cares a Lot? The Greatest Hits.

Writing in a review of Introduce Yourself for AllMusic, Greg Prato noted that the song "should have been a hit", citing its "loopy bass and irresistible melodicism". The Guardian's Jeremy Allen included "Anne's Song" in his 2014 list of Faith No More's top ten songs, describing it as "not unlike a heavier Tom Tom Club in the verses, with a smattering of Mosley’s hero David Bowie in the chorus". Allen felt that "Anne's Song", along with most of Mosley's work with the band, was "more aligned with contemporary music than anything that came after". In a Faith No More discography retrospective, Louder Sound wrote that the song "really delivers", noting Mosley's "goofy, purposefully-underachieving vocals". Writing for The Quietus, Jamie Thomson felt that the song rewarded repeated listening, with successive playing revealing " the angst, uncertainty and sexual politics that come with something simple as "going out with some friends""; Thomson also highlighted the "charismatic, soulful melancholia" of Mosley's voice.

== Track listing ==
No.	Title	Writer(s)	Length
1.	"Anne's Song"	Gould, Bottum	4:46
2.	"Greed"	Gould, Mosley	3:50

== Personnel ==
- Chuck Mosley – lead vocals
- Jim Martin – guitar
- Billy Gould – bass guitar, backing vocals
- Roddy Bottum – keyboards, backing vocals
- Mike Bordin – drums

== Footnotes ==
=== References ===
- Chirazi, Steffan (1994). Faith No More: The Real Story. Castle Communications. ISBN 978-1898141150.
- Harte, Adrian (2018). Small Victories: The True Story of Faith No More. Jawbone Press. ISBN 978-1911036371.
