= Land of Sunshine =

Promotional single by Faith No More

from the album Angel Dust
- Released: 1992
- Recorded: January–March 1992
- Studio: Coast Recorders & Brilliant Studios, San Francisco, California
- Genre: Funk metal
- Length: 3:43
- Label: Slash
- Songwriter: Faith No More
- Producer: Matt Wallace

"Land of Sunshine" is the opening track to Angel Dust, the fourth studio album by the American rock band Faith No More. It was released as a promotional single in 1992 along with "Midlife Crisis" and has been compared in its opening style to "From out of Nowhere", the opening track and first single from the band's previous studio album, The Real Thing. The song's lyrics contain, amongst other things, questions from Scientology personality tests, with one of them, the question "Does emotional music have quite an effect on you?", being described by Tom Sinclair of Rolling Stone as "the perfect tag line for Angel Dust". The song was one of the three key songs picked out by Robert Christgau from the album in his review, the two others being "Midlife Crisis" and "Midnight Cowboy".

== Lyrical content ==
The lyrics for "Land of Sunshine" were written by Mike Patton alongside "Caffeine" during a sleep deprivation experiment and included lines taken almost directly from fortune cookies and the Oxford Capacity Analysis personality test offered by the Church of Scientology. He also watched much late-night television to get into the right frame of mind.

There are three lines taken from the personality test, although a fourth appears in the lyric booklet with Angel Dust; question 179 "Do others push you around?". Two of the questions used were shortened slightly for their use in the song; question 27, "Do you often sing or whistle just for the fun of it?" had its end changed to "just for fun", and question 196, "Do you sometimes feel that your age is against you (too young or too old)?" was shortened to "Do you feel sometimes that age is against you?". The unchanged question 69, "Does emotional music have quite an effect on you?" is featured during the choruses along with the phrase "Here's how to order."

The lines taken from the fortunes in Chinese fortune cookies were virtually unchanged and appear throughout the first and second verses of the song. They are as follows, as they appeared on the fortunes:

"Life to you is a dashing bold adventure"
"Sing and rejoice, fortune is smiling upon you"
"You have a winning way, so keep it"
"You are an angel heading for a land of sunshine"
"Pat yourself on the back and give yourself a handshake"

== Inspiration and vocal style ==
Vocalist Mike Patton has frequently cited Peruvian soprano Yma Sumac as a primary influence on his multi-octave vocal techniques. On the track "Land of Sunshine", Patton explicitly channels Sumac's avant-garde style, including a vocal melody around the 3:10 mark that paraphrases the soaring operatic trills and register leaps found in her 1950 track "Ataypura" at 0:35.

== Track listing ==
No.	Title	Lyrics	Music	Length
1.	"Land of Sunshine"	Patton	Gould, Bottum	3:43
2.	"Caffeine"	Patton	Gould, Patton	4:28
3.	"Kindergarten"	Patton, Bottum	Gould, Martin	4:29

== Personnel ==
Personnel taken from Angel Dust liner notes.

- Mike Bordin – drums
- Roddy Bottum – keyboards
- Billy Gould – bass
- Jim Martin – guitar
- Mike Patton – vocals
