= A Small Victory =

1992 single by Faith No More

Single by Faith No More

from the album Angel Dust
- B-side: "Let's Lynch the Landlord"; "Malpractice"
- Released: August 3, 1992
- Genre: Alternative metal; dance-rock
- Length: 4:58
- Label: Slash; Reprise
- Songwriter: Faith No More
- Producer: Matt Wallace

Faith No More singles chronology
"Midlife Crisis" (1992)	"A Small Victory" (1992)	"Everything's Ruined" (1992)

"A Small Victory" is the 10th track and the second single from American rock band Faith No More's fourth studio album, Angel Dust (1992), released as a single on August 3, 1992 by Slash and Reprise Records. The song was later remixed by Youth of Killing Joke and released later the same month. It was their last single to chart on the US Billboard Modern Rock Tracks chart, peaking at number 11, and reached the top 30 in Finland and the United Kingdom.

When asked about the song's meaning, Mike Patton said:

It's kind of about, well my dad was a coach, so I grew up and I always wanted to win. And well, I found out that I just can't win every game… darn it.

== Artwork ==
The cover features a World War II photograph of a soldier loading shells, which originally featured on the cover of Life in September 1939.

== Music video ==
At the time it was described as their "most radio-friendly song" and stylistically more of a "dance song" than their other works. For this reason the band wanted a music video "visual to complement it."

The video was directed by Marcus Nispel, known for his work with C+C Music Factory. On September 2, 1993, the music video was nominated for the MTV Video Music Awards for Best Art Direction, but lost to Madonna's song "Rain" off her album Erotica.

== Track listing ==
Standard track listing
No.	Title	Lyrics	Music	Length
1.	"A Small Victory" (Video edit)	Patton	Bordin, Bottum, Gould, Patton	4:23
2.	"A Small Victory"	Patton	Bordin, Bottum, Gould, Patton	4:58
3.	"Let's Lynch the Landlord"	Biafra	Biafra	2:58
4.	"Malpractice"	Patton	Patton	4:03

Remix track listing
No.	Title	Length
1.	"A Small Victory"	4:58
2.	"A Small Victory" (R-evolution 23 (Full Moon) Mix)	7:21
3.	"Malpractice"	4:03
4.	"A Small Victory" (Sundown Mix)	5:27
5.	"A Small Victory" (Sundown Instrumental)	6:05
6.	"A Small Victory" (R-evolution 23 Edit)	3:53

== Personnel ==
- Mike Patton – vocals
- Jim Martin – guitars
- Billy Gould – bass
- Roddy Bottum – keyboards
- Mike Bordin – drums
- Martin Glover – remixes
- John Brough – engineer on remixed tracks
- Green Ink – sleeve artwork
- Ross Halfin – band photo

== Charts ==
Chart (1992–1993)	Peak position
Australia (ARIA)	84
Finland (Suomen virallinen lista)	17
UK Singles (Official Charts)	29
UK Airplay (Music Week)	42
US Alternative Airplay (Billboard)	11

== Release history ==
Region	Version	Date	Format(s)	Label(s)	Ref(s).
United Kingdom	Original	August 3, 1992	7-inch vinyl; CD; cassette	Slash; London	
Europe	Original	August 3, 1992	7-inch vinyl; CD; cassette	Slash; London	
United Kingdom	Original	August 17, 1992	12-inch vinyl	Slash; London	
Japan	Original	August 19, 1992	Mini-CD	Slash; London	
Australia	Original	August 24, 1992	CD; cassette	Slash; Liberation	
United Kingdom	Youth remix	August 31, 1992	12-inch vinyl; CD; cassette	Slash; London	
Europe	Youth remix	September 1, 1992	12-inch vinyl; CD; cassette	Slash; London	
United States	Youth remix	October 29, 1992	CD; cassette	Slash; Reprise	
