= OK to Go =

Studio album by Virginia Coalition
- Released: September 21, 2004
- Recorded: 2004
- Genre: Rock
- Length: 53:37
- Label: Bluhammock (USA)
- Producer: Matt Wallace

Virginia Coalition chronology
Fake Out Takes (Not for Production) (2003)	OK to Go (2004)	The Bob Years (2005)

Professional ratings
Review scores
Source	Rating
ARTISTdirect	3/5 stars

OK to Go is the fifth album by rock band Virginia Coalition. This was the first album after founding member Steve Dawson parted with the band. The album contains re-vamped versions of Rock and Roll Party's "Come and Go" and "Walk to Work".

== Track listing ==
1. "Pick Your Poison" - 4:37
2. "Last Goodbye" - 4:00
3. "Walk to Work" - 3:57
4. "Voyager II" - 5:11
5. "Mason Dixon" - 4:46
6. "Off the Air" - 5:20
7. "Abby Are You Endless" - 3:17
8. "Meteor" - 4:38
9. "Come and Go" - 4:02
10. "Bumpin' Fresh" - 4:02
11. "Places People / No Diggity" - 9:47
