= Nightcrawler =

Nightcrawler or nightcrawlers may refer to:

== Earthworms ==
- Nightcrawler, any large earthworm, especially those favored in angling
  - Lumbricus terrestris, a globally distributed species of earthworm, known in North America as nightcrawler or Canadian nightcrawler
  - Eudrilus eugeniae, the African night crawler, native to tropical West Africa
  - European nightcrawler, Eisenia hortensis

== Literature ==
- "The Night Crawler", a 1959 short story by Charles G. Finney
- Nightcrawler (character), a Marvel Comics superhero
- "The Case of the Night Crawler", a Sherlock Holmes short story by George Mann
- Nightcrawling, a 2022 novel by Leila Mottley

== Film and television ==
- Nightcrawler (film), a 2014 American film
- "Nightcrawler", an episode of X-Men (TV series)
- "Nightcrawlers" (The Twilight Zone), an episode of the 1980s TV series
- "The Night Crawler", an episode of The Bold Ones: The New Doctors
- "The Night Crawler", a 1950 episode of The Adventures of Frank Race

== Music ==
- Nightcrawlers (band), a Scottish dance music project
- The Nightcrawlers, a Daytona Florida band
- New Orleans Nightcrawlers, a jazz and rhythm and blues group
- Nghtcrwlrs, a New Jersey band

=== Albums ===
- Nightcrawler (album), by Pete Yorn, 2006
- Night Crawler (album), by Sonny Stitt with Don Patterson, 1965, and the title track
- Nightcrawlers: The KMFDM Remixes, by White Zombie, 1992
- Nightcrawler, by The Retrosic, 2006

=== Songs ===
- "Nightcrawler", a 2010 single by Nosaj Thing
- Nightcrawler (Travis Scott song), from the 2015 album Rodeo
- "Nightcrawler", a 2017 single by Zhu
- "Nightcrawler", a 2018 single by InCrest
- "Nightcrawler" by Rebelution from the 2007 album Courage to Grow
- "Nightcrawler" by Aye Nako from the 2017 album Silver Haze
- "Nightcrawler" by Czarface from the 2015 album Every Hero Needs a Villain
- "Night Crawler", a 2012 single by Lucid featuring SwizZz
- "Night Crawler", a 2017 single by Chris Webby
- "Night Crawler", by Judas Priest from the 1990 album Painkiller
- "Night Crawler", by Bob James from the 1976 album Heads
- "Night Crawler", a cover by Powerwolf on the 2015 album Blessed & Possessed
- "Night Crawler", by Starz from the 1976 album Starz
- "Night Crawler", by Ezo from the 1989 album Fire Fire
- "Night Crawler", by Lisa Maffia from the 2003 album First Lady
- "Night Crawler", by Jimsaku from the 1993 album Wind Loves Us
- "Night Crawler", by Thee Oh Sees from the 2013 album Floating Coffin

== Other uses ==
- Nightcrawlers, fictional characters in video game F.E.A.R. Perseus Mandate
- Night Crawler, a game by Rabbit Software
- The Night Crawler, nickname of Shoshone, a Chicago, Burlington and Quincy Railroad train
- The Nightcrawler, a ring name of wrestler The Boogeyman
- Yobai (Japanese, 'night crawling'), an ancient Japanese custom of young unmarried men and women

== See also ==
- Diggs Nightcrawler, a video game for the PlayStation 3
- Night photography
