= Come Out Fighting =

Come Out Fighting may refer to:

== Film and television ==
- Come Out Fighting (1945 film), an American "East Side Kids" film
- Come Out Fighting (1973 film), an Australian short film directed by Nigel Buesst
- Come Out Fighting, a 1950 television drama featuring Marlon Brando and Lee Tracy
- Come Out Fighting, a 1967 British television documentary about the boxer Harry Scott

== Other uses ==
- Come Out Fighting (radio drama), 1950 radio drama by Ralph Peterson
- Come Out Fighting, a 2002 album by Anything But Joey
- "Come Out Fighting", a 1991 song by Pennywise from Pennywise
- "Come out fighting", the motto of the 761st Tank Battalion of the U.S. Army during World War II
