= Epic and Other Hits =

Epic And Other Hits

Compilation album by Faith No More
- Released: October 4, 2005
- Recorded: 1984–1997
- Genre: Alternative metal
- Label: Flashback Records

Faith No More chronology
This Is It: The Best of Faith No More (2003)	Epic And Other Hits (2005)	The Platinum Collection (2006)

Epic And Other Hits is a compilation album released by Faith No More in 2005. Despite the album's title, only a handful of songs on it are actual hits, even though the band had other hits which do not appear here.

== Background ==
The compilation greatly focuses on the band's 1989 album The Real Thing, with six out of the ten tracks taken from it. Epic And Other Hits is generally considered a "weak" compilation, and many fans see it as a way to cash in on the success of Mike Patton. Most notably, the Mosley-era track "Arabian Disco" is included, from the We Care A Lot album, which was then out of print on CD. The album also contains no tracks from King for a Day... Fool for a Lifetime or Introduce Yourself. It is presumed that this album consists of a small selection of songs licensed by Warner Bros Records to the budget label Flashback, and as such no other songs could be included without breaching copyright. This compilation is generally not mentioned in the band's canon due to their lack of involvement in it, and has not been included on Spotify or other streaming platforms.

The liner notes mistakenly list Album of the Year as being released in August 1997, when it was in fact released during June 1997.

Professional ratings
Review scores
Source	Rating
AllMusic	link

== Track listing ==
1. "Epic" (Music: Gould/Martin/Bottum/Bordin; lyrics: Patton)
2. "We Care a Lot" (Live) (Music: Gould/Martin/Bottum/Bordin; lyrics: Mosley)
3. "Arabian Disco"
4. "Falling to Pieces" (Music: Gould/Bottum/Martin; lyrics: Patton)
5. "Last Cup of Sorrow" (Music: Gould; lyrics: Patton)
6. "Surprise! You're Dead!"
7. "Zombie Eaters"
8. "Midlife Crisis" (Music: Martin/Bottum/Gould/Bordin; lyrics: Patton)
9. "The Real Thing"
10. "War Pigs"

== Personnel ==
- Mike Bordin – drums
- Roddy Bottum – keyboards
- Billy Gould – bass guitar
- Jon Hudson – guitar
- Jim Martin - guitar
- Mike Patton – vocals
- Craig DeGraff - Producer
- Bob Fisher - Remastering
