= Townburg =

Studio album by Virginia Coalition
- Released: 2000
- Genre: Rock
- Length: 30:45
- Label: Bluhammock (USA)

Virginia Coalition chronology
The Colors of The Sound (1998)	Townburg (2000)	Rock and Roll Party (2003)

Townburg, released in 2000, is the second album by the American rock band Virginia Coalition.

Professional ratings
Review scores
Source	Rating
Fretplay	5/5

== Track listing ==
1. "Lonely Cowboy" - 3:17
2. "E Song" - 3:55
3. "Likeness" - 3:23
4. "Atchafalaya" - 3:58
5. "Luminiferous Ether" - 3:55
6. "Wichita" - 1:05
7. "Green and Grey" - 4:21
8. "Mista Banks" - 4:49
9. "A Song" - 3:07
10. "Go-Go Tech" - 2:00
11. "Wichita Reprise" -

== Personnel ==
Virginia Coalition

- Steve Dawson - vocals, guitar
- Jarret Nicolay - bass, keyboard, guitar, vocals
- Paul Ottinger - bass, keyboard, guitar, percussion
- John Patrick - drums
- Andrew Poliakoff - vocals, guitar, washboard, percussion

== Recorded at The Fidelitorium ==
www.fidelitorium.com

== Produced ==
Ted Comerford

== Mixed ==
Mitch Easter

With guests:

- Eddie from Ohio's Julie Murphy Wells - Female vocals on Wichita
- Tony LaSasso - Ozark Harp on Wichita Reprise
- Mitch Easter - Guitar Solo on A Song
