= Prepare the Preparations =

Studio album by Ludo
- Released: (United States) September 7, 2010
- Genres: Pop rock, power pop
- Label: Island/Redbird Records
- Producer: Matt Wallace

Ludo chronology
You're Awful, I Love You (2008)	Prepare the Preparations (2010)

Singles from Prepare the Preparations
- 1. "Whipped Cream" Released: July 13, 2010

Prepare the Preparations is the third full-length studio album by St. Louis band Ludo. It is the band's second release on Island Records. The album was originally scheduled for an August 17 release date but was pushed back to September 7, 2010.

== Album information ==
The album was produced by Matt Wallace. The lead single off the album is "Whipped Cream." Topics on the new album include, "skeletons, pirates, cyborgs, robots, leprechauns, witches, curses, Bonnie and Clyde and 1950s R&B." Volpe said of the new album, "I like to write from my imagination, so there are songs about skeletons, grave robbing lovers, a cyclops and of course love and all that stuff."

== Track listing ==
All tracks are written by Andrew Volpe (except "Safe in the Dark", which was written by Tim Ferrell).

Prepare the Preparations
No.	Title	Length
1.	"Too Tired to Wink"	3:30
2.	"Cyborgs vs. Robots"	3:26
3.	"Whipped Cream"	2:56
4.	"Anything for You"	3:23
5.	"Manta Rays"	3:54
6.	"Skeletons on Parade"	5:49
7.	"I'll Never Be Lonely Again"	3:39
8.	"All the Stars in Texas"	3:13
9.	"Rotten Town"	3:24
10.	"Overdone"	4:39
11.	"Battle Cry"	3:53
12.	"Safe in the Dark"	3:47
13.	"Skeletons Lullaby (Hidden Track)"	0:44

== Members ==
Band

- Andrew Volpe - Vocals, guitar
- Tim Ferrell - Guitar, backing vocals
- Tim Convy - Moog, backing vocals
- Matt Palermo - Drums, backing vocals

Additional musicians

- Tommy Cantillon - Bass guitar
- Matt Bowen - Violin, programming
- Tim Christensen - Upright bass
- Marc McClusky - Programming, loops
