= Virginia Coalition =

American rock band

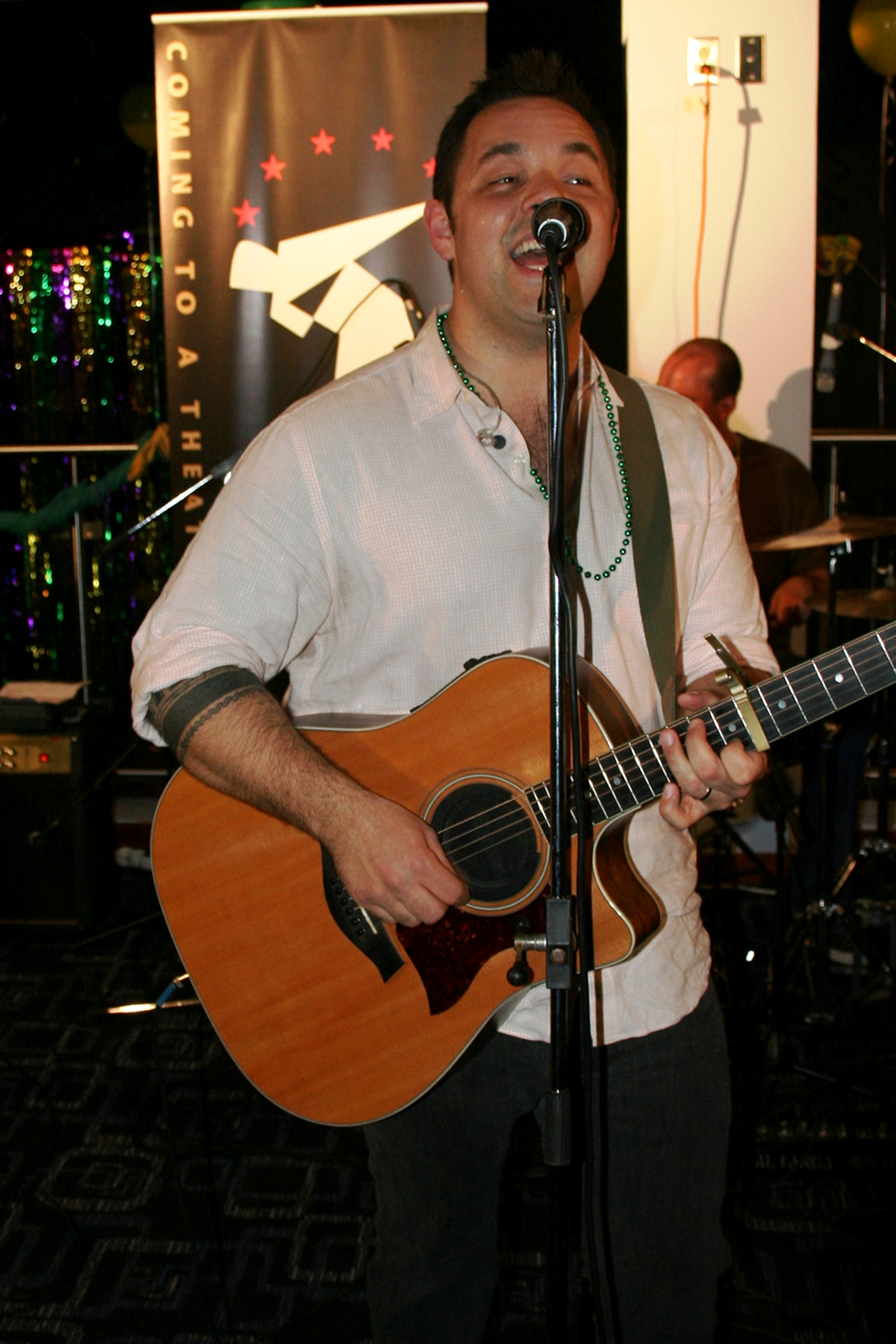
- Andy Poliakoff, lead vocals, guitar for the band Virginia Coalition

Background information
- Origin: Alexandria, Virginia
- Genres: Rock, Folk, Go-go
- Years active: 1997–present
- Labels: Bluhammock (USA)
- Members: Andrew Poliakoff; Steve Dawson; Paul Ottinger; Jarrett Nicolay
- Past members: John Patrick

Virginia Coalition is an American rock band from Alexandria, Virginia, whose five founding members met in the early 1990s at T. C. Williams High School. Often referred to as VACO by fans (and the band), the band self-released their first album, The Colors of The Sound, in 1998. The group toured between Boston and Virginia heavily in the late 1990s, supporting The Colors of the Sound and its 2000 follow-up, Townburg; the band's tour van logged more than 100,000 miles by May 2001. The band's 2003 album on Koch Records, Rock & Roll Party, peaked at #18 on the Billboard Top Internet Albums chart. This album marked their transition from a band that primarily played in the Northeast and Mid-Atlantic regions of the United States to a nationwide touring act. The group's next full-length, OK to Go, was released in 2004 and was produced by Matt Wallace. In 2008 they followed up with the album Home This Year.

The band's original lineup consisted of:

- Andrew Poliakoff - lead vocals, guitar, percussion
- Steve Dawson - lead vocals, guitar
- Paul Ottinger - keyboards, percussion, vocals, bass guitar, guitar,
- Jarrett Nicolay - bass guitar, banjo, guitar, vocals, Casio
- John Patrick "JP" - drums, percussion, vocals

Former songwriter and lead guitarist Steve Dawson left the band in late 2003. Dawson was a significant contributor to the band's first three albums, singing lead vocals on approximately half the band's released tracks. In February 2007, VACO announced the departure of another founding member, John Patrick. Steve Dawson re-joined the band for concerts in early 2011.

In recent years the following musicians have joined the band live for occasional concerts:

- Adam Dawson - drums
- Eli Staples - keyboards
- Jay Starling - lap steel guitar

== Discography ==
- 1998 - The Colors of The Sound
- 2000 - Townburg
- 2003 - Rock and Roll Party
- 2003 - Fake Out Takes (Not for Production)
- 2004 - OK to Go
- 2005 - The Bob Years
- 2006 - Live At The 9:30 Club
- 2006 - Winter '07 (side-project of bassist Jarrett Nicolay as My New Mixtape)
- 2008 - Almost Home (EP)
- 2008 - Home This Year
- 2021 - VACO 2021EP (EP)
