= Everything's Ruined =

1992 single by Faith No More

Single by Faith No More

from the album Angel Dust
- B-side: "Edge of the World" (extended live); "RV" (live)
- Released: November 9, 1992
- Genre: Funk metal
- Length: 4:35
- Label: Slash; London
- Songwriter: Faith No More
- Producer: Matt Wallace

Faith No More singles chronology
"A Small Victory" (1992)	"Everything's Ruined" (1992)	"Easy" (1993)

"Everything's Ruined" is a song from American rock band Faith No More's fourth studio album, Angel Dust (1992), and the final single to be released from the album's original track listing. The single was released on November 9, 1992, and charted at number 28 in the United Kingdom. In 1993, the song was released in Australia and peaked at number 63.

== Music video ==
The music video, directed by Kevin Kerslake, features the band (and occasionally four children) singing, blue screened over stock footage ranging from wildlife shots, baseball games and a wide selection of other clips. The band at times interacts with the clips, like fleeing from a seemingly-giant tortoise.

Billy Gould addressed the intentional cheapness of the video in a 20th anniversary Q&A on the Faith No More Blog:

The Videos for "Midlife Crisis" and "A Small Victory" seem to have both have [sic] high concepts and big budgets while the video for "Everything's Ruined" does not. Why was it that the video for "Everything's Ruined" (arguably the best song on the album) was so goofy and easy to produce?

The easy answer is, Warner's spent the video budget on "Small V" and "Midlife" so that when it came time to "Everything's Ruined" there's wasn't much left (!!). It was our idea to take this further and make a video as cheap as humanly possible, in one of those video booths like they had at county fairs, where you sing and dance in front of a blue screen. We didn't quite get to do that, but we got it as close as possible.

== Accolades ==
Publication	Country	Accolade	Year	Rank
Q Magazine	United Kingdom	"100 Greatest Guitar Tracks Ever!"	2005	75

== Track listings ==
UK Part 1

1. "Everything's Ruined"
2. "Edge of the World (Extended Live Mix with Bass Solo)" (St. Louis, September 18, 1992)
3. "RV" (Live in Dekalb, Illinois, September 20, 1992)

UK Part 2

1. "Everything's Ruined"
2. "Midlife Crisis" (live in Dekalb, Illinois, September 20, 1992)
3. "Land of Sunshine" (live in Dekalb, Illinois, September 20, 1992)

Europe

1. "Everything's Ruined"
2. "Easy" (live from Munich, November 9, 1992)
3. "RV" (live in Dekalb, Illinois, September 20, 1992)

== Charts ==
Chart (1992)	Peak position
Australia (ARIA)	63
UK Singles (OCC)	28

== Release history ==
Region	Date	Format(s)	Label(s)	Ref.
United Kingdom	November 9, 1992	7-inch vinyl; CD; cassette	Slash; London	
Japan	December 21, 1992	Mini-CD	Slash; London	
Australia	June 14, 1993	CD; cassette	Slash; Liberation	
