= Home This Year =

Studio album by Virginia Coalition
- Released: March 18, 2008
- Genre: Rock
- Label: Bluhammock (USA)

Virginia Coalition chronology
Live at the 9:30 Club (2006)	Home This Year (2008)

Home This Year is the sixth album by rock band Virginia Coalition.

It was rated 4.5 out of 5 stars by AllMusic.

== Track listing ==
1. "Home This Year" - 4:01
2. "Santa Fe" - 4:23
3. "Stars Align" - 3:59
4. "Not Scared" - 4:07
5. "Same Page" - 3:34
6. "Sing Along" - 4:40
7. "Lately" - 4:05
8. "A Desperate Way" - 3:57
9. "Look My Way" - 3:46
10. "I Got This One" - 3:58
