= Midlife Crisis =

1992 single by Faith No More

- Artwork for European releases

Single by Faith No More

from the album Angel Dust
- B-side: "Midlife Crisis" (The Scream mix); "Jizzlobber"; "Crack Hitler"; "Midnight Cowboy"
- Released: May 25, 1992
- Genre: Alternative metal
- Length: 4:22
- Label: Slash; Reprise
- Songwriter: Faith No More
- Producer: Matt Wallace

Faith No More singles chronology
| "Falling to Pieces" (1990) | "Midlife Crisis" (1992) | "A Small Victory" (1992) |

"Midlife Crisis" is a song by American rock band Faith No More. It was released on May 25, 1992 by Slash and Reprise Records, as the first single from their fourth album, Angel Dust (1992). It became their only number-one hit on the US Billboard Modern Rock Tracks chart and also reached number 63 on the US Cash Box Top 100 and number ten on the UK Singles Chart.

== Music and lyrics ==
"Midlife Crisis" is an alternative metal song, which incorporates progressive rock and hip hop elements.

Mike Patton has denied that the song is about having a midlife crisis, as he did not know what one would feel like, but says that "it's more about creating false emotion, being emotional, dwelling on your emotions and in a sense inventing them" and that:

The song is based on a lot of observation and a lot of speculation. But in sort of a pointed way it's kind of about Madonna... I think it was a particular time where I was being bombarded with her image on TV and in magazines and her whole shtick kind of speaks to me in that way... like she's going through some sort of problem. It seems she's getting a bit desperate.

== Production ==
During production, the song was given the working title of "Madonna"; this title was later maintained as a setlist name during live performances. The drum track for the song contains a sample of the first bar of the song "Cecilia", as performed by Simon and Garfunkel, repeated throughout.sample The bridge features a sample of "Car Thief" by the Beastie Boys.

== Music video ==
The music video for "Midlife Crisis" was directed by Kevin Kerslake, who also directed their shoestring video for the song "Everything's Ruined". The version on the Who Cares a Lot? The Greatest Videos collection is uncensored and contains shots during the bridge which show a man being stretched by four horses (alluding to an old punishment for regicide, known as "quartering") – the censored version uses additional shots of choirboys running to a large cross instead. Singer Mike Patton can also be seen dancing around holding a spade.

For the video, the sound mix of this song is slightly different than the album version (on certain promotional releases it is referred to as 'The Scream' mix). For the DVD re-release of Who Cares a Lot? The Greatest Videos, the album version of the song is used instead, with the accommodating edits made.

== Cover versions ==
It was covered by American rock band Disturbed twice: the first time for a Faith No More tribute album, which was instead released through the Internet; the second time as a B-side to their fourth studio album Indestructible. This re-recorded version was released on Covered, A Revolution in Sound and remastered for a third release on their B-side compilation album The Lost Children.

In 2021, ex-Korn drummer David Silveria's band Breaking in a Sequence included a cover of "Midlife Crisis" on their debut EP.

== Track listings ==
| No. | Title | Lyrics | Music | Length |
|---|---|---|---|---|
| 1. | "Midlife Crisis" (The Scream mix) | Patton | Bottum; Bordin; Gould; Patton | 3:55 |
| 2. | "Jizzlobber" | Martin; Patton | Martin | 6:39 |
| 3. | "Crack Hitler" | Patton | Gould; Bottum; Bordin | 4:39 |
| 4. | "Midnight Cowboy" | Instrumental | Barry | 4:13 |

Australian edition
| No. | Title | Lyrics | Music | Length |
|---|---|---|---|---|
| 1. | "Midlife Crisis" | Patton | Bottum; Bordin; Gould; Patton | 4:24 |
| 2. | "Jizzlobber" | Martin; Patton | Martin | 6:39 |
| 3. | "As the Worm Turns" (re-recording) | Mosley | Bottum; Gould; Mosley | 2:38 |

== Personnel ==
- Mike Patton – vocals, samples
- Billy Gould – bass guitar
- Jim Martin – guitar
- Roddy Bottum – keyboards
- Mike Bordin – drums

== Charts ==
=== Weekly charts ===
| Chart (1992) | Peak position |
|---|---|
| Australia (ARIA) | 31 |
| Austria (Ö3 Austria Top 40) | 9 |
| Belgium (Ultratop 50 Flanders) | 39 |
| Canada Top Singles (RPM) | 77 |
| Eurochart Hot 100 (Music & Media) | 61 |
| Germany (GfK) | 32 |
| Ireland (IRMA) | 13 |
| Israel (Israeli Singles Chart) | 12 |
| Netherlands (Single Top 100) | 36 |
| New Zealand (Recorded Music NZ) | 32 |
| UK Singles (Official Charts) | 10 |
| UK Airplay (Music Week) | 47 |
| US Alternative Airplay (Billboard) | 1 |
| US Mainstream Rock Airplay (Billboard) | 32 |
| US Cash Box Top 100 | 63 |

=== Year-end charts ===
| Chart (1992) | Position |
|---|---|
| US Modern Rock Tracks (Billboard) | 20 |

== Certifications ==
| Region | Certification | Certified units/sales |
|---|---|---|
| New Zealand (RMNZ) | Gold | 15,000^{‡} |
^{‡} Sales+streaming figures based on certification alone.

== Release history ==
| Region | Date | Format(s) | Label(s) | Ref. |
|---|---|---|---|---|
| United Kingdom | May 25, 1992 | 7-inch vinyl; CD; cassette | Slash; London | |
| Japan | June 8, 1992 | Mini-CD | Slash; London | |
| Australia | June 15, 1992 | CD; cassette | Slash; Liberation | |

== See also ==
- Number-one modern rock hits of 1992
