= You're Awful, I Love You =

Studio album by Ludo
- Released: February 26, 2008
- Recorded: Sound City and Studio Delux in Van Nuys, CA and Sawhorse Studios in St. Louis, MO
- Genre: Pop rock
- Length: 48:31
- Label: Island/Redbird Records
- Producer: Matt Wallace

Ludo chronology
| Broken Bride (2005) | You're Awful, I Love You (2008) | Prepare the Preparations (2010) |

Singles from You're Awful, I Love You
- 1. "Drunken Lament (Digital Only)"; 2. "Love Me Dead"; 3. "Go-Getter Greg"

You're Awful, I Love You is the second full-length studio album by St. Louis pop punk indie band Ludo and the band's first to be released by Island Records. The title comes from a lyric in their single, "Love Me Dead." The song "Love Me Dead" was featured in a summer 2008 promo for the television series House and also became Ludo's most successful song to date, peaking at #8 on the Billboard Alternative Songs Chart.

== Critical reception ==
Professional ratings
Review scores
| Source | Rating |
|---|---|
| AllMusic | 3.5/5 stars |
| Alternative Addiction | 3.5/5 stars |
| Alternative Press | 3/5 stars |
| IGN | 7.5/10 stars |
| People | 2.5/4 stars |

IGN's Chad Grischow praised lead singer Andrew Volpe's vocals for being "compelling without becoming theatrical" and the mixture of "poppy hooks and macabre lyrics" throughout the track listing but felt that most of them "fall short with bland verses ("Drunken Lament")" and "a little too much pop gloss ("Mutiny Below")". He concluded that, "You're Awful, I Love You is a solid album of straight-ahead rockers, enhanced by some creepy songwriting and fantastic hooks. Ludo's major label debut hints that they probably have a great album or two in them, if they can overcome their inconsistency. Still, you will not want to turn your back on this one, for a few reasons." AllMusic writer William Ruhlmann felt that the band's lyricism was considerably "dumbed down" from their previous effort, noting how "Topeka" squanders its beginning by having a lack of direction and continuous repetition of said beginning, and highlighting "Go-Getter Greg" for having "enough flair" to come from their first album, concluding that "Those who have never heard Ludo may think You're Awful, I Love You is an efficient work of pop/rock. Those who know better will be disappointed." A writer for Alternative Addiction preferred the "darker themed songs ("Love Me Dead", "Lake Pontchartrain")" over the "really bright, energetic and fun ("Please", "Such As It Ends")" but gave credit to the latter for having a likable charm to them, concluding that the record "brings the band's intelligent and quirky rock to the mainstream, and that's never a bad thing."

== Track listing ==
All tracks are written by Andrew Volpe (except "Topeka" and "The Boat Song", which were written by Tim Ferrell).

You're Awful, I Love You
| No. | Title | Length |
|---|---|---|
| 1. | "Love Me Dead" | 4:20 |
| 2. | "Drunken Lament" | 3:09 |
| 3. | "Please" | 3:18 |
| 4. | "Topeka" | 3:04 |
| 5. | "Lake Pontchartrain" | 3:36 |
| 6. | "Such As It Ends" | 3:25 |
| 7. | "Mutiny Below" | 3:40 |
| 8. | "Streetlights" | 4:18 |
| 9. | "Go-Getter Greg" | 3:12 |
| 10. | "The Horror of Our Love" | 4:28 |
| 11. | "Scream, Scream, Scream" | 3:52 |
| 12. | "In Space" | 3:57 |
| 13. | "The Boat Song (Hidden Track)" | 2:52 |

Bonus Tracks
| No. | Title | Length |
|---|---|---|
| 1. | "Safe In The Dark" | 4:12 |
| 2. | "Japan It!" | 3:22 |

- The album also contains a hidden track in the pregap of the album entitled "Goodbye Bear".

== Personnel ==
Adapted credits from the liner notes of You're Awful, I Love You.

Ludo

- Andrew Volpe - Vocals, Guitar
- Tim Ferrell - Guitar, Backing vocals
- Tim Convy - Moog, Backing vocals
- Marshall Fanciullo - Bass guitar, Backing vocals
- Matt Palermo - Drums, Backing vocals

Additional musicians

- Matt Bowen - Violin ("Streetlights")

Artwork

- Marshall Fanciullo - Album art, Original illustrations
- Patrick Hegarty - Album art
- Jeff Minton - Photos

Production

- Matt Wallace - Producer
- Marc McClusky, Jason McEntire - Additional recording ("Drunken Lament"), Producer ("Go-Getter Greg")
- Paul "Fig" Figueroa, Matt Bowen, Mike Landolt, Rafael Serrano, Miles Wilson - Engineers
- Josh Smith, Posie Muliadi - Additional engineers
- Mark Needham - Mixing
- Will Brierre - Assistant engineer
- Brian Gardner - Mastering
