= Ludo (band) =

American alternative rock band

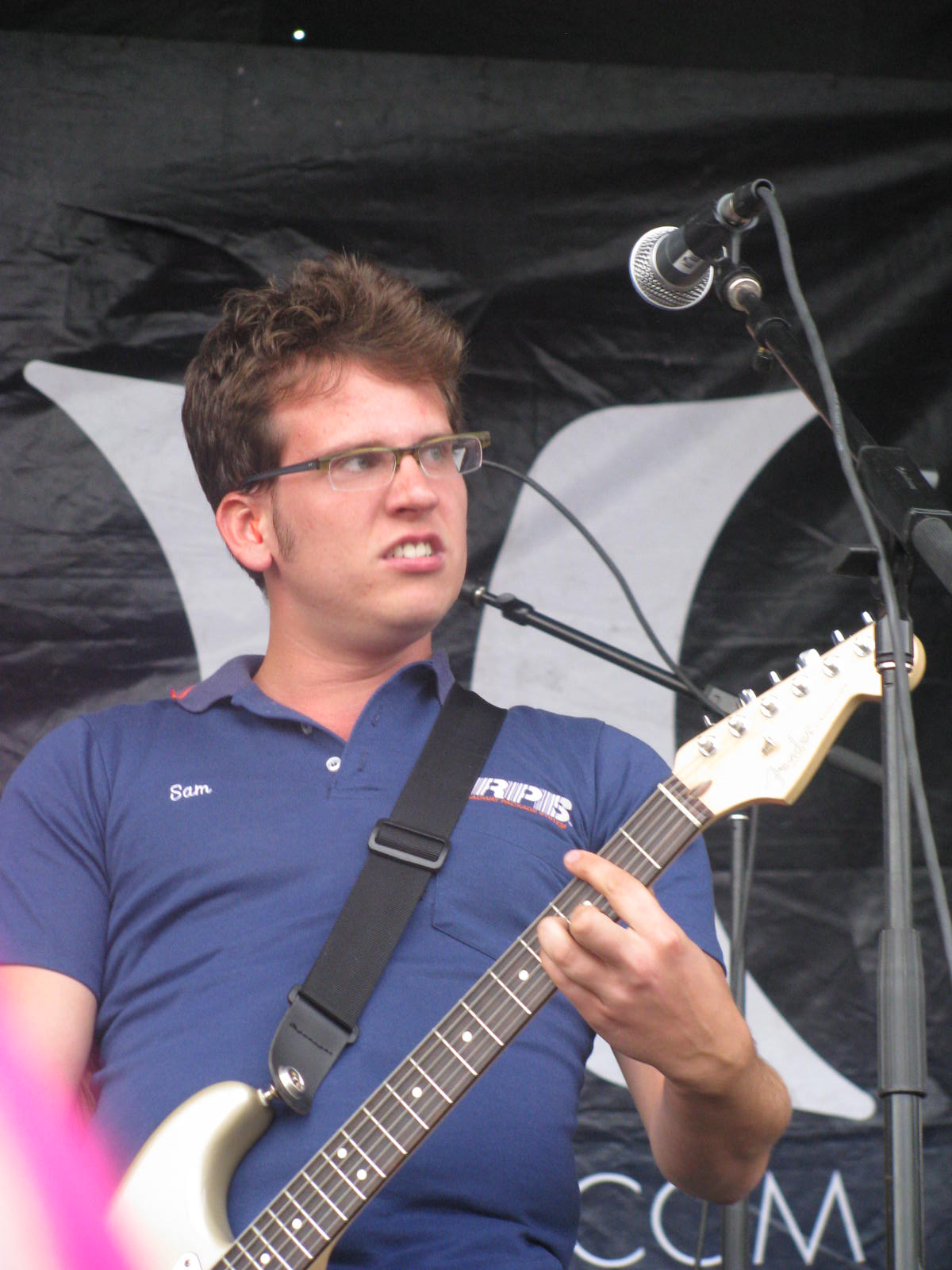
- Andrew Volpe with Ludo in Buffalo, NY for Warped Tour 2008

Background information
- Origin: St. Louis, Missouri
- Genres: Power pop, pop rock, alternative rock
- Years active: 2001–2012 (hiatus), 2018-Present
- Labels: Redbird; Island
- Members: Andrew Volpe; Tim Ferrell; Tim Convy; Matt Palermo; Dave Heltibrand
- Past members: Marshall Fanciullo
- Website: ludorock.com

Ludo is an alternative rock band from St. Louis, Missouri. The band consists of lead vocalist/guitarist Andrew Volpe, lead guitarist/back up vocalist Tim Ferrell, moog/synth and back up vocalist Tim Convy, drummer/back up vocalist Matt Palermo, and bassist/back up vocalist “Deepcut” Dave Heltibrand.

Ludo released their first album in 2003, then two more before going on hiatus in 2012. A reunion show in 2018 sold out quickly, and Ludo has since generally performed a handful of times a year.

== History ==
=== Early years ===
Ludo's origins can be traced to songs written while Andrew Volpe was attending John Burroughs School in Ladue, Missouri. While sitting in his car in the local Schnucks supermarket parking lot after class, Volpe penned songs that would become some of Ludo's first, including their local breakout radio hit "Hum Along." After his sophomore year at Washington University in St. Louis, Volpe formed a band with fellow John Burroughs graduate Dave Heltibrand. Lead guitarist Tim Ferrell joined the band while home on break from the University of Notre Dame. The three named the band after the character Ludo in the film Labyrinth.

Heltibrand soon left the band, but lead Volpe and Ferrell continued to play occasionally around St. Louis as an acoustic duo. In 2002, the pair moved to Tulsa, Oklahoma, after Ferrell graduated from Notre Dame and Volpe dropped out of Washington University's music program. Tim Convy, one of Ferrell's friends from St. Louis, was added to the band after Volpe watched him sing with an 80s cover band in Columbia, Missouri. The three men performed together through early 2003, telling audiences they would return in the fall with a rhythm section and an album.

=== Solid line-up and Ludo ===
Ludo posted an ad: "Bassist/drummer needed to help take over world." Bassist Marshall Fanciullo drove down to Tulsa from Omaha, Nebraska, to audition in summer 2003, and Matt Palermo left community college in Spring, Texas, to join the band on drums.

After playing together for only three weeks, Ludo recorded and released their self-titled debut album in August 2003 on their own indie label, Redbird Records. The album included several songs written and performed by Volpe's former band, Karate Lunchbox. Ludo's first show as a full band was at a bar in Indianapolis on August 8, 2003. For the next few years, the band toured extensively with other Midwestern bands, including The Dog and Everything, Anything But Joey, Pomeroy and The Primetime Heroes. This exposure brought them moderate indie success.

=== Broken Bride ===
As Ludo continued touring, the band became known for their themed live performances. They hosted annual concerts at The Pageant in St. Louis, and The Blue Note in Columbia, including HalLUDOween, A Very Ludo Christmas, and Cinco de Mustache.

In 2005, the band returned to the studio to record the EP Broken Bride, a rock opera about a man who travels backward and forward through time in an attempt to save his wife from dying in a car accident in 1989. The opening track, "Broken Bride: Part 1," was a song that originally stood alone before evolving into the full opera. On the subsequent tour, Ludo performed Broken Bride in its entirety. The opera proved to be so popular that several stage adaptations have been produced by various colleges and schools.

With increasing popularity, and major label interest, Ludo began touring with larger bands such as Relient K, Motion City Soundtrack, This Providence, House of Heroes, Sing It Loud, The Spill Canvas, and The Presidents of the United States of America.

=== Island Records ===
In October 2006, Ludo signed a five-album deal with Island Records that turned Redbird Records into an Island imprint. Under the deal, the band may release noncommercial material such as Christmas albums or rock operas on the Redbird imprint. In spring 2007, Ludo headed to southern California to record their major-label debut with Maroon 5 producer Matt Wallace.

On February 26, 2008, they released their album, You're Awful, I Love You. The album's lead single was "Love Me Dead," a song written in 2004. "Love Me Dead" had been a fan favorite for years and the band made two music videos for it. The first video was made with fan participation through their website. The second was professionally made. The single received increased exposure when, on July 11, Ludo performed it live on The Tonight Show with Jay Leno. "Love Me Dead" was also adapted into a commercial teaser for the show House, and was No. 10 on the No. 1 Alternative Countdown on Fuse the week of August 18, 2008. The increased exposure saw Ludo playing on several well-known tours, shows and festivals, such as Warped Tour, Lollapalooza, SXSW, Batfest, and Pointfest.

In November 2008, while on tour in Chicago, bassist Fanciullo was relieved of his duties in the band. No official reason was given for his departure, and Ludo did not hire a permanent bass player to replace him. Several people have filled the bassist slot for tours, including Adam Brooks formerly of Anchondo, and Tommy Cantillon of Tommy and the High Pilots.

In 2009, the band announced that their first two releases, Ludo and Broken Bride, would be re-released through Island. Ludo also undertook a short tour to promote the re-release of "Broken Bride" by again playing the EP in its entirety. On the tour's off-dates, members Tim Ferrell, Tim Convy, and Matt Palermo along with Adam Brooks toured as a side project, "The New Heathers."

Ludo's third full-length album, Prepare the Preparations, was released September 7, 2010. The lead single from the album was "Whipped Cream." Topics on the album are wide and imaginative. Volpe said of writing the album, "I like to write from my imagination, so there are songs about skeletons, grave-robbing lovers, a cyclops and of course love and all that stuff." The band headlined a 29-city tour of the United States in support of the album.

As of January 2012, Ludo had been removed from Island Records' artists section, and the Island Records imprint was removed from Ludo's official website, ludorock.com, leading to speculation that the label had ended their relationship with Ludo. There has been no official statement from Ludo regarding this matter.

Andrew Volpe and several other band members, recording as Hot Problems, created an album, titled "Relax, It's Just a Pop Album", out of a PledgeMusic.com project.

=== Post-hiatus ===
In fall 2018, the band tweeted that they would do a "Back from the Dead! One Night Only!" show at The Pageant in St. Louis on Oct. 27 to celebrate 15 years of the band and the 10-year anniversary of You're Awful, I Love You. Dubbed "HalLUDOween", the show sold out in less than 20 minutes. A late show was added that sold out almost as quickly. The band expressed shock, saying that they didn't know people still cared about Ludo.

On July 15, 2019, the band announced that they would perform a two-show series at the Pageant: "HalLUDOween 2019", consisting of "All Shadow's Eve" on November 1 and "Quiet Pines Senior Prom" on November 2. Tickets went on sale that day; both shows sold out within an hour. On July 21, Ludo added a third, late show on November 2, titled "Rumble in Transylvania."

In 2020, a planned "Easter In Chicago" performance at the House of Blues Chicago was canceled due to the coronavirus pandemic. That year, Ludo released its first new music in ten years, a song called "Scare Me". The show was rescheduled to April 22 and 23, 2021.

The band has been consistently active on their social media and have teased at being back in the studio working on new music.

On August 26, 2022, the band performed at "Ludo Night" at Busch Stadium in St. Louis before that night's St. Louis Cardinals baseball game.

On October 28, 29, and 30, 2022, Ludo performed another three night 'HalLUDOween' festival at the Pageant in St. Louis, bringing back some of the bands they used to play with in their early days (Anything But Joey, The Dog And Everything, and Anchondo) as an openers for each night. They also had pre and post show activities throughout the day, such as an escape room, Tarot card readings, karaoke, and stand up comedians.

In April 2023, the band's song "Sara's Song" was featured on the Netflix series Love is Blind when Zack sang a version of it to Irina in The Pods.

== Members ==
Current members

- Andrew Volpe – lead vocals, rhythm guitar (2001–2012, 2018–present)
- Tim Ferrell – lead guitar, backing vocals (2001–2012, 2018–present)
- Tim Convy – keyboards, backing vocals (2002–2012, 2018–present)
- Matt Palermo – drums, backing vocals (2003–2012, 2018–present)
- Dave Heltibrand – bass, backing vocals (2001–2002, 2022–present)

Touring members

- Tom Cantillion – bass, backing vocals (2018–2022)
- Adam Brooks – bass, backing vocals (2018–2022)

Former members

- Marshall Fanciullo – bass (2003–2008)

== Discography ==
=== Studio albums ===
| Year | Album | Chart positions | |
| Year | Album | 200 | HEAT |
|---|---|---|---|
| 2004 | Ludo: Released April 6 | – | – |
| 2008 | You're Awful, I Love You: Released February 26 | 166 | 5 |
| 2010 | Prepare the Preparations: Released September 7 | 72 | - |

=== Extended plays ===
| Year | Album | Chart positions | |
| Year | Album | 200 | HEAT |
|---|---|---|---|
| 2005 | Broken Bride: Released 2005 | - | - |

=== Singles ===
| Year | Single | Peak chart positions | Album |
| Year | Single | U.S. Modern | Album |
|---|---|---|---|
| 2008 | "Love Me Dead" | 8 | You're Awful, I Love You |
| 2008 | "Go-Getter Greg" | 50 | You're Awful, I Love You |
| 2010 | "Whipped Cream" | — | Prepare the Preparations |
| 2020 | "Scare Me" | — | Scare Me (Single) |
| 2023 | "Hey Friends" | — | Hey Friends (Single) |
| 2023 | "An Italian Werewolf in St. Louis” | — | An Italian Werewolf in St. Louis (Single) |
"—" denotes singles that did not chart.

=== Videos ===
- "Hum Along"
- "Good Will Hunting By Myself"
- "Laundry Girl"
- "Love Me Dead" (Mannequin version)
- "Love Me Dead" (Official)
- "Love Me Dead" (Fan Toothbrush Video)
- "A Very Ludo Christmas"
- "Go-Getter Greg"
- "Save Our City"
- "Whipped Cream"
