= Ludo (Ludo album) =

Studio album by Ludo
- Released: (United States) April 6, 2004
- Genre: Pop rock
- Length: 48:22
- Label: Redbird Records
- Producer: Jimmy Callahan

Ludo chronology
Ludo (2004)	Broken Bride (2005)

Singles from Ludo
- 1. "Hum Along" Released: November 21, 2006; 2. "Good Will Hunting By Myself" Released: April 30, 2007

Professional ratings
Review scores
Source	Rating
Allmusic	4/5 stars

Ludo is the first album to be released by St. Louisian pop punk band Ludo on indie label Redbird Records. It was released April 6, 2004 and was re-released on September 29, 2009.

== Track listing ==
All tracks are written by Ludo.

Ludo
No.	Title	Length
1.	"Saturday Night Thunderbolt"	3:53
2.	"Roxy"	3:51
3.	"Hum Along"	4:20
4.	"Ode to Kevin Arnold"	4:17
5.	"Sara's Song"	4:00
6.	"Summertime"	3:30
7.	"Hello, My Name Is Your T.V."	4:09
8.	"Good Will Hunting By Myself"	4:40
9.	"Laundry Girl"	6:25
10.	"Air-Conditioned Love"	5:52
11.	"Girls On Trampolines"	3:25

2009 Bonus Track
No.	Title	Length
12.	"Elektra's Complex"	2:41

Bonus Live Disc
No.	Title	Length
1.	"Girls On Trampolines"	4:33
2.	"Elektra's Complex"	2:40
3.	"Saturday Night Thunderbolt"	4:26
4.	"Hello, My Name Is Your T.V."	4:09
5.	"Ode to Kevin Arnold"	4:22
6.	"Roxy"	4:21
7.	"Air-Conditioned Love"	4:44
8.	"Laundry Girl"	6:28
9.	"Hum Along"	5:37
10.	"Good Will Hunting By Myself"	5:05

== Personnel ==
Band

- Andrew Volpe - Vocals, Guitar
- Tim Ferrell - Guitar, Vocals
- Tim Convy - Vocals, Moog Synthesizer
- Matt Palermo - Drums
- Marshall Fanciullo- Bass

Production

- Jimmy Callahan - Producer, Engineer, Mixing
- Allan Hessler - Assistant Engineer, Assistant
