= Broken Bride =

EP by Ludo
- Released: (United States) September 27, 2005
- Genre: Rock
- Length: 27:16
- Label: Redbird Records

Ludo chronology
Ludo (2003)	Broken Bride (2005)	You're Awful, I Love You (2008)

Professional ratings
Review scores
Source	Rating
Absolute Punk	(8.8/10)

Broken Bride is a 2005 EP by the band Ludo. The EP is the second release from the band, and is a rock opera concept album. Broken Bride was re-released on September 29, 2009. Ludo also completed a short tour to promote its re-release by playing the EP in its entirety. A video for "Save Our City" was released on October 6, 2009. The album was adapted into two stage productions, including one performed at the 2016 New York Musical Festival.

== Track listing ==
All tracks are written by Andrew Volpe, except for "Part III: The Lamb and the Dragon", written by Volpe and Tim Ferrell.

Broken Bride
No.	Title	Length
1.	"Part I: Broken Bride"	3:40
2.	"Save Our City"	6:36
3.	"Part II: Tonight's the Night"	2:51
4.	"Part III: The Lamb and the Dragon"	8:16
5.	"Part IV: Morning in May"	5:43

== Stage adaptations ==
=== University of Chicago production ===
In November 2006, Broken Bride was produced as a staged theater piece by University Theater at the University of Chicago. The 28-minute concept album was adapted for the stage by first-time director Paul Bruton. Bruton had received permission from the band to stage Broken Bride in spring 2006 and proposed a black box theater production for that fall. Broken Bride used a minimalistic, expressionist approach to stage design wherein a variety of complex locations can be implied within a limited setting. Music for the production was provided by the band in the form of a re-mixed version of the album, stripped of vocals, with the exception of a few harmonies in "Save Our City" and "Part III: The Lamb and the Dragon". The melodies were arranged for the 15-member cast by Tristan Cosino, who also coached and directed the ensemble.

"If you are in the mood for some intense rock music, zombies stomping a few feet from your seat, chaos spread across the earth, dinosaurs attacking, anarchy descending, and the Earth scorched to a crisp, then this is probably the show you have been waiting for," wrote the Chicago Maroon.

=== Chinese Mother Jewish Daughter adaptation and productions ===
Another adaptation appeared at the 2010 Shortened Attention Span Festival with no additions to the original album.

This adaptation continued on as Ludo's Broken Bride: A Rock Opera, which premiered at ANT Fest 2013 in New York City, adapted/directed by Stacey Weingarten, with new arrangements by Dana Levinson, and produced by Chinese Mother Jewish Daughter LLC. The ANT Fest production was the first time songs from other Ludo albums were added in an attempt to expand the storytelling.

In 2014, an even more expanded concert version of the production consisting of 24 numbers was presented at The Cutting Room.

An update of this modified version ran for one week at the New York Musical Festival in August 2016. The expanded story told of Tommy (the Traveler), played by Carson Higgins, who attempts to return home to his lover, Oriel (Gabrielle McClinton), while a flashback of himself (Michael Jayne Walker) falls in love with Oriel throughout the show. Other cast members included Brian Charles Rooney as King Simius, Jamen Nanthakumar as Joe/Finn, Marissa O'Donnell as Mena/Mayor, Brendan Malafronte as Hawking, and L Morgan Hamilton as The Archangel Raguel. Reviews of the NYMF production were mixed to positive, pointing out the "grand scope and inventive stagecraft is a treat unto itself", including the "action-packed high fantasy" nature of the production and "the effect of an exploding piñata" in puppetry and projection design, despite flaws like the overabundance of plot lines, sound balance issues, and physically challenging material. In the New York Times, the production was called, "full-blown theater", "a good time, with prehistoric puppets, dream ballets, and rock undiluted for the stage".

The website Ludo's Broken Bride: A Rock Opera website once stated that a production to celebrate an upcoming anniversary of album in the works.

== Personnel ==
Band

- Andrew Volpe - Vocals, Guitar
- Tim Ferrell - Guitar, Backing Vocals
- Tim Convy - Moog, Backing Vocals
- Marshall Fanciullo - Bass Guitar, Backing Vocals
- Matt Palermo - Drums, Backing Vocals

Production

- Michael Fossenkemper - Mastering
- Joe M. Leonard Jr. - Video Editor, Video Producer
- Jason McEntire - Producer, Engineer, Mixing
