= ABJ (motorcycle) =

Motorcycle built by AB Jackson Cycles of Birmingham, England

The ABJ was a lightweight bike built by AB Jackson Cycles of Birmingham, England between 1950 and 1954. They were powered by 48cc, 98cc and 123cc Villiers two-stroke engines. The 48cc Auto-Minor sold for just 41 pounds.
