= Rock and Roll Party =

Studio album by Virginia Coalition
- Released: January 21, 2003
- Genre: Rock
- Length: 48:29
- Label: DCN
- Producer: Joe Zook

Virginia Coalition chronology
Townburg (2000)	Rock and Roll Party (2003)	Fake Out Takes (Not for Production) (2003)

Professional ratings
Review scores
Source	Rating
AllMusic	3/5 stars

Rock and Roll Party is the third album by rock band Virginia Coalition, released in 2003. It was produced by Joe Zook.

== Critical reception ==
AllMusic called the album "a fine collegiate pop record: It's smart and catchy with just enough of an adventurous spirit to carry it along." PopMatters wrote that "the Virginia Coalition's keen musical sense is what puts this album primarily over the top, changing gears without missing a beat."

== Track listing ==
1. "By and By" - 2:57
2. "Come and Go" - 2:32
3. "Walk to Work" - 3:22
4. "Valentine Eraser" - 3:04
5. "Referring Rosarita" - 5:06
6. "This is Him (Hurricane Song)" - 3:22
7. "Sink Slowly" - 2:03
8. "Rock and Roll Party" - 1:06
9. "Jerry Jermaine" - 4:18
10. "Moon in the Morning" - 4:04
11. "Your Least Favorite Song" - 2:41
12. "Stella" - 2:50
13. "Martha Lu" - 2:17
14. "Maggie in the Meantime" - 3:59
15. "Johnny Wonder" - 3:11
16. "Bonus Track 1" - 1:37
