= Angel Dust (Faith No More album) =

Studio album by Faith No More
- Released: June 8, 1992
- Recorded: January - February 1992
- Studios: Coast Recorders and Brilliant Studios, San Francisco, California
- Genres: Alternative metal; experimental metal
- Length: 58:47
- Labels: Slash; Reprise
- Producers: Matt Wallace; Faith No More

Faith No More chronology
The Real Thing (1989)	Angel Dust (1992)	King for a Day... Fool for a Lifetime (1995)

Singles from Angel Dust
- 1. "Midlife Crisis" Released: May 25, 1992; 2. "A Small Victory" Released: August 3, 1992; 3. "Everything's Ruined" Released: November 9, 1992; 4. "Easy" Released: December 29, 1992

Angel Dust is the fourth studio album by American rock band Faith No More, released on June 8, 1992, by Slash and Reprise Records. It is the follow-up to 1989's highly successful The Real Thing, and was the band's final album to feature guitarist Jim Martin. It was also the first album where vocalist Mike Patton had any substantial influence on the band's music, having been hired after the other band members had written and recorded everything for The Real Thing except vocals and most of the lyrics. The band stated that they wanted to move away from the funk metal style of their prior releases, towards a more "theatrical" sound.

In the United States, Angel Dust failed to match the commercial heights of The Real Thing. Upon release, it sold roughly 500,000 copies in the United States, while The Real Thing had been certified platinum in the United States for sales of over a million copies. However, in many other countries, it managed to outsell The Real Thing. Due to the international sales, it is Faith No More's best-selling album to date, having sold over 2.5 million copies worldwide. Despite selling less than The Real Thing in the United States, it still managed to debut at number 10 on the Billboard 200, making it the band's only top-ten album in the United States.

== Background, title and artwork ==
Back cover of the album

Following the success of their previous album The Real Thing and its subsequent tour, Faith No More took a break before beginning work on new songs. Mike Patton recorded the eponymous debut album of his high-school band Mr. Bungle, which was released in August 1991. Faith No More decided not to "play it safe" and instead took a different musical direction, much to the dismay of guitarist Jim Martin. Martin also did not like the album title Angel Dust chosen by keyboardist Roddy Bottum. In an interview taken while they were in the studio he said that "Roddy [Bottum] wanted to name it Angel Dust, I don't know why, I just want you to know that if it's named Angel Dust, it didn't have anything to do with me." He also stated that Bottum was the one who came up with a basic concept of a bird front cover and a meat locker back cover.

Bottum stated that he chose the name because it "summed up what [they] did perfectly" in that "it's a really beautiful name for a really hideous drug and that should make people think." Similarly, the artwork contrasted one beautiful image with a gruesome one by depicting a soft blue airbrushed great egret on the front cover (photographed by Werner Krutein) while on the back is an image of a cow hanging on a meat hook (created by Mark Burnstein). Both bassist Billy Gould and Mike Bordin said that the image on the rear of the album is not based on support for vegetarianism but rather a preview of the music, suggesting its combination of being "really aggressive and disturbing and then really soothing", the "beautiful with the sick".

At one point, the band were considering naming the album Crack Hitler, in response to how the record label viewed it as potential "commercial suicide". Despite not choosing this name, a song on the album still had the same title. The band had kept the music from the label until the mixing stages. Bottum recalled that they got "really scared" once they heard the album, while Martin remembered that the president visited the studio one day and told the members he hoped none of them had bought houses. In 2022, Gould said that with the album, they did not have ambitions to become bigger than they already were at that point, saying "we didn't expect to be Whitesnake or Bon Jovi, we didn't go into this band wanting to own 15 houses and three Learjets and have 17 supermodels on speed dial".

A photo of a group of Russian soldiers with the band members' heads inserted was edited by Werner Krutein and used as the cover of the "Midlife Crisis" single. The image also appears in the booklet art for Angel Dust. Bordin said that the record label had originally sent the band an image which had their five heads on a black background, and wanted them to use this for the booklet art. The band disliked what the record label sent and came up with the idea to have their heads on a group of Russian soldiers, which Bordin thought was similar to Monty Python and how "you see a guy's head, a monster comes by and picks it up and Ptock! puts it somewhere".

== Writing and recording ==
=== Writing process ===
The writing for Angel Dust took up most of 1991 with large portion of the songs being written by either Billy Gould, Roddy Bottum, Mike Bordin, and for the first time, Mike Patton. Regarding this Patton said:

There had never been any question of my staying in the band. We started writing the music for this album, and being part of something so fundamental was what made sure of it for me. The Real Thing had been like someone else's, someone else's band, it had felt like an obligatory thing. They hadn't needed a damn singer, it was just that they had to have a singer. That's why I was there, that's why Chuck was there, we weren't needed there.

While some attributed the sonic shift on Angel Dust to Mike Patton's increased involvement, Patton himself downplayed this notion, saying "I just think we've gotten better at playing what we hear in our heads", adding "before, we used to kinda cheat around, and play around what it was. We could never translate it into the band, and we're getting better at doing that. like, we wanted to do a real lazy, sappy kinda ballad, so we covered the theme from Midnight Cowboy! And there's even a song that sounds like The Carpenters!". In a trend that started when then-vocalist Chuck Mosley lived in Los Angeles while the rest of the band resided in the Bay Area, the band would record demo tapes of the songs and exchange them between each other in Los Angeles before sending them to Jim Martin so that he could work on his guitar arrangements, after which he would send them back for approval.

Album producer Matt Wallace stated there was a great deal of tension between Jim Martin and the rest of the band that made the recording sessions difficult. Speaking on the acrimony, Wallace said:

Just before making Angel Dust, Jim Martin's dad died. That was a pretty big thing, obviously. I remember I spoke to Jim, and I know the guys in the band did too. But during Angel Dust, there was a very, very noticeable lack of enthusiasm on his part. I mean, was he there? Yeah, he did go there and play. But a lot of times, he'd be playing these noodle-y things, and the band and I were like, 'Dude, what the hell? Play some heavy guitar s—t on this, man! We need what you do." It was challenging. Plus, he kept calling the record "Gay Disco" – every time they'd play something, he'd say, [dismissively] "Eh, this is a bunch of gay disco." It's too bad, because he's really talented, but again, this is a band that just knew what they wanted to do.

During their 1992 summer European tour, the band sometimes incorporated a disco jam in between songs, possibly as a jab towards Martin and how he viewed Angel Dust as "gay disco". In a 1992 interview with MTV during the making of the album, Patton also joked that they wanted to become a disco band, so they could defend disco music from the likes of Martin.

The lyrics for Angel Dust were written for the most part by vocalist Mike Patton. He got his inspiration for the lyrics from many different places such as questions from the Oxford Capacity Analysis, fortune cookies and late-night television. After engaging in a sleep deprivation experiment, he wrote "Land of Sunshine" and "Caffeine": Patton added that, "I drove around a lot in my Honda, drove to a real bad area of town, parked and just watched people. Coffee shops and white-trash diner-type places were great for inspiration." Patton described "RV" as being a character sketch based on the "white-trash" people he was observing during the making of the album. He said in 1992, "it's the white trash saga: You wake up, you do nothing and you talk a lot of shit... and that's what the song does." "RV" incorporates spoken word elements from Patton, and in 1992, it was described by Music Express magazine as having a "David Lynch aura" to it, due to its unorthodox subject matter and structure. Patton has said the lyrics to "Midlife Crisis" were inspired by singer Madonna, and the song had the working title of "Madonna". Patton felt he was being "bombarded" with Madonna's image in the media at that time. He interpreted her constant reinvention and public presence as a sign of desperation and a struggle to remain relevant, which he channeled into the lyrics.

Songs with lyricists other than Patton include "Be Aggressive" by Roddy Bottum (about fellatio); "Everything's Ruined", by Mike Patton and Billy Gould; "Kindergarten" by Mike Patton and Roddy Bottum; and "Jizzlobber", by Jim Martin and Mike Patton, which according to Patton, is about his fear of imprisonment. However, Gould, in response to a question by a fan, suggested that the song is about a porn star. "Be Aggressive" has homosexual undertones, with Bottum having come out as gay around this time. He said in December 1992 that "what I like about 'Be Aggressive' is that even though it's macho in a homosexual way, lots of FNM listeners probably imagine that it is a woman who is getting down on her knees and swallowing rather than a man. I guess it's easier for people to understand and deal with it that way."

"Kindergarten" has rap-style vocals from Patton, which mirror some of his earlier vocals on The Real Thing. Along with "Caffeine", it is one of the more melancholic tracks, and lyrically highlights a person who is still stuck with the mentality of a child. Towards the end of the song, it incorporates a section where Patton can faintly be heard impersonating an auctioneer during a bidding. "Caffeine" lyrically appears to reference Patton's feelings during the sleep deprivation experiment. In an interview promoting Angel Dust, Patton mentioned that caffeine (via coffee) was the only drug he took. Gould later said that during the making of Angel Dust, Patton developed a coffee dependency to help him relax and function properly. The single "Everything's Ruined" is one of the most piano-driven tracks, with the band considering it to be among the most accessible on the album. Bottum said that despite its accessibility, Patton's vocal stylings added another dimension to it, saying "it's radio friendly for sure, a pop song. But our singer always adds the unexpected and the twists". Patton himself considered the song to still have dark lyrical matter which matched much of the album, saying in 1992 "there are some very strange songs on this record. A lot of them have a lot of despair in them, they're very disturbing. 'Everything's Ruined' is a good example of that." According to Patton, during the writing of the album, he was listening to easy listening-style music, and this inspired the chorus for "Everything's Ruined", which he compared to Frank Sinatra and Jackie Gleason. "Smaller and Smaller" incorporates cinematic, Middle Eastern flavored synthesizer work from Bottum, and had the working title of "Arabic" or "Arabian Song". Patton was pleased with Bottum's keyboard work on the album, with Bottum using a new E-mu Emax, which didn't have an instruction manual as it had been discarded. Patton in 1992 noted his fascination with heavily incorporating new technology such as this into music, saying to MTV "I think it's probably a good thing if computers just take over music. Because computers are a lot more messed up than people, and the more messed up and farther away music gets from music, the healthier it's going to be for music. I think computers could kind of take it to an new level. People are the worst, the worst thing about music is that people play it."

In addition to exploring instrumental film music with their cover of the Midnight Cowboy theme, the band was experimenting with doing other songs in non-rock genres during this time, including country music on "RV" (which had a working title of "Country Western"), German polka music on the B-side "Das Schützenfest" and R&B/soul music on the bonus track "Easy", which was a cover of the 1977 Commodores song. They would continue to explore doing songs in different genres on their next two releases, with 1995's King for a Day... Fool for a Lifetime having a significant number of tracks which weren't written in the style of rock songs. In an August 1992 interview, Gould said "we don't play any style of music that you can put your finger on" and that "we don't have to be a heavy metal band". He added that, "in a way, it is kind of bad when I say that because a lot of heavy metal people [get] pissed off". Gould also remarked in December 1992 that "we're not alternative", claiming Faith No More were just a mainstream band, despite not setting out to become that when they initially started over a decade ago. In another 1992 interview, Gould said the band were consciously trying to move away from the funk metal category, which they were often lumped into alongside similar bass-oriented artists such as Infectious Grooves, Red Hot Chili Peppers and Living Colour. Gould remembered in March 1995, "we started getting tapes from bands who were heavy metal funk bands and they were saying we were their main influence, it was horrible". In 1992 he added, "this whole funk metal thing is really disgusting. The last thing I ever want to be in is a funk metal band – we're gonna try to be anything except that.... I would say that any band which plays funk metal, I hate, and would safely say that most of the band feel the same way." Patton said in 1992 that he considered their new sound on Angel Dust to be "death metal movie music." In a 1992 MTV interview, Patton additionally noted his lack of interest towards the current music scene, saying "music sucks, I hate all music now. I really don't listen to music much anymore. I go to the music store and I look for like two hours, and usually I just end up going to the soundtracks section."

=== Recording process and outtakes ===
For the recording of Angel Dust, Faith No More were once again assisted by Matt Wallace, who had produced all of the group's previous studio recordings. They entered Coast Recorders in late 1991, originally set to track a total of 17 songs; however after writing two more while in studio ("Malpractice" being one of them), a total of 19 were recorded. At that time, the final song titles had not been chosen so they were often referred to by the following working titles, some of which continued to be used internally by the band, including on their live set lists:

- "Triplet" – "Caffeine"
- "Madonna" – "Midlife Crisis"
- "Macaroni and Cheese", "Country Western Song" – "RV"
- "Arabic", "The Arabian Song" – "Smaller and Smaller"
- "F Sharp" – "Kindergarten"
- "I Swallow" – "Be Aggressive"
- "Japanese" – "A Small Victory"
- "Action Adventure" – "Crack Hitler"
- "The Sample Song" – "The World Is Yours"
- "The Carpenters Song" – "Everything's Ruined"
- "The Funk Song" – "Land of Sunshine"
- "The Shuffle Song"/"Seagull Song" – Unpublished recording

While 13 tracks were released on the standard album, the sessions also produced a cover of the Commodores' "Easy", a reworking of the previously recorded 1985 track "As the Worm Turns", and a song called "The World Is Yours". In 1992–93, "Easy" and the re-recorded version of "As the Worm Turns" were both included on certain editions of Angel Dust, in addition to appearing on other releases such as EPs and singles. In late 1992, "Easy" appeared on a promotional vinyl release by Warner Bros. Records titled Season's Greetings, which also featured a live recording of the song "Slide", by Faith No More's Slash labelmates L7. In April of the following year, "Easy" appeared on the EP Songs to Make Love to, and was also released as a single around this time. The re-recorded "As the Worm Turns" originally appeared as a bonus track on the Japanese edition of Angel Dust (alongside "Easy"), in addition to appearing on some versions of the "Midlife Crisis" single. Aside from featuring Mike Patton instead of their earlier singer Chuck Mosley, one of the major differences between the 1985 "As the Worm Turns" and the re-recording is the incorporation of DJ scratches on the newer version. "The World Is Yours" was posthumously released on the band's first compilation album Who Cares a Lot? The Greatest Hits, which came out in November 1998, six months after Faith No More's original split. While the songs "Das Schutzenfest" and the Dead Kennedys cover "Let's Lynch the Landlord" were both released along with "Easy" on an EP in late 1992, at least one of these songs was not actually recorded during the Angel Dust sessions: "Let's Lynch the Landlord" was recorded in Bill Gould's bedroom and produced by the band, prior to the Angel Dust sessions, for Virus 100, a Dead Kennedys tribute album. While it is unclear as to whether or not "Das Schutzenfest" is from the Angel Dust sessions, Matt Wallace is listed as the engineer for this song but is given no producer credit (in contrast with the co-producer credit he is given for Angel Dust). Their cover of "Let's Lynch the Landlord" was done in the style of a lounge song, although the original Dead Kennedys version was a punk song. The "Let's Lynch the Landlord" cover later appeared on the Songs to Make Love to EP, along with "Das Schutzenfest".

=== 1991 mini-tour and early live performances of Angel Dust songs ===
When the album was being written in 1991, the band went on a month-long mini-tour of Argentina, Brazil and Japan, where they debuted early versions of "The World Is Yours," "RV," and "Caffeine". This run of shows occurred between August and October 1991, and ended with a single show in Oakland, California on October 12, 1991, for the Day on the Green festival. The Day on the Green performance aired as part of an MTV special hosted by Karyn Bryant, along with performances by Metallica and Queensrÿche. The first performances of "The World Is Yours" and "RV" came during an August 31, 1991 concert in Buenos Aires, Argentina, and the two songs would go on to be played several more times during this 1991 mini-tour, with "Caffeine" added during the tour. The other songs from the Angel Dust sessions only started being performed live in 1992. To date, the 1991 performances of "The World Is Yours" remain the only times the song is known to have been played live. The 1991 shows in Japan were Faith No More's first in the country, and they would tour Japan again in 1993 after the album had been released, although they did not do any further shows in Latin America following the album's release. In an August 1992 interview with Australian magazine Hot Metal, Patton claimed that while in Japan during 1991, a teenage Japanese fan handed him a VHS, telling him it was a present since she heard he liked "porno", and when Patton turned on the VHS, he discovered it had child pornography on it. Patton remarked, "I took the tape home and put it in my VCR and it was like 'Oh my God!' I didn't expect that at all, especially from a little girl. The fan who gave it to me was like a teenager and the girl in the film, she was probably 12, 11."

=== Samples ===
There were many samples used on Angel Dust, to the point that it was called a "gratuitous" amount and record label executives were concerned about the volume of samples used. They came from such sources as Simon and Garfunkel, Diamanda Galás, Z'EV, and The Wizard of Oz. The Simon and Garfunkel sample is from the first bar of their song "Cecilia" and appears throughout the drum track of "Midlife Crisis". "Malpractice" contains a four-second sample of the second movement of Dmitri Shostakovich's String Quartet No. 8 as performed by the Kronos Quartet, on their album Black Angels; track 8, "Allegro molto", at 2:10. It features in four points towards the end of the song at 2:56, 3:02, 3:22 and 3:26. Many of the original samples used in the songs were recorded by Roddy on a Digital Audio Tape recorder whilst "just whilst wandering out and about". "Crack Hitler", as well as featuring samples of sirens in the background, features a sample in the intro of Iris Lettieri reading a flight announcement at the Rio de Janeiro-Galeão International Airport. She then tried to sue the band for using her voice without permission. There are also samples of Native American chanting, amongst the sound effects from Sound Ideas, in the background of "Smaller and Smaller". Patton considered "Smaller and Smaller" to have a "Dances With Wolves aesthetic" because of this sample, and noted they messed with the sample, which led to him labelling the song as "shameless culture rape". A brief succession of sounds, including a police car siren and a warp noise, similar to what Frank Zappa abundantly made use of on his album Joe's Garage is recognizable in the song "A Small Victory". The song "Midlife Crisis" contains a sample of "Car Thief" by the Beastie Boys. The intro of "Caffeine" features sounds of animals, of which monkeys and a wolf can be distinguished. The B-side "The World Is Yours" features the most samples of any of the songs on the album by far, and was even referred to as "The Sample Song" by the band. The intro alone features a death sentence by rapid fire (the words "Aim. Fire!" can be heard), and an elephant. The bridge of the song includes a recording of R. Budd Dwyer's suicide that was broadcast in 1987.

"Be Aggressive" has cheerleaders chanting the song title throughout the verses. These chants were made specifically for the album, rather than being samples, and featured four 15 to 17 year old cheerleaders (who performed the song live with the band in 1992). The chants were meant to resemble cheerleaders cheering on a football team, even though the protagonist in the song is someone performing oral sex. Some would later note similarities between "Be Aggressive" and Marilyn Manson's 2003 song "mOBSCENE", which had cheerleaders repeatedly chanting "Be Obscene".

== Touring and promotion ==
=== Guns N' Roses tour in Europe and North America ===
Faith No More started the tour to promote Angel Dust shortly after the album's completion on the European leg of the Use Your Illusion Tour with Guns N' Roses and Soundgarden, which Bottum described as a "complete European vacation" due to their light concert schedule. A reason they were chosen for this tour was since Guns N' Roses frontman Axl Rose was a fan of The Real Thing, claiming in 1990 that Faith No More were the only band he was "jealous of". The band cited the Guns N' Roses shows as being the biggest they'd ever done, with the next biggest being a tour with Billy Idol in support of The Real Thing. Patton said in 1992, "basically, we are a small band. We are a pubic hair in Guns N' Roses' shower". Before the tour began, Gould joked that "it'll be interesting to see exactly how many bodyguards Axl Rose has, I want the inside story." In a June 1992 interview with The Washington Post, Patton said that during these European shows, they were more interested watching the "spectacle" surrounding Guns N' Roses than they were seeing them perform. He remarked, "[it's this] unbelievable rock mafia thing, that boggles the mind. They kind of have their own government, so you can't help but think in CIA terms about it."

On their previous tour for The Real Thing, the band toured extensively throughout 1989 to early 1991, which contributed to them growing tired of their songs from that album and seeking different sounds on Angel Dust. In an interview taken on June 6, 1992, Gould reflected on the beginning of another touring cycle for Angel Dust and the shows with Guns N' Roses and Soundgarden, saying:

This is really just the beginning for us, Last time we toured, with The Real Thing, I left home at the age of 26 and got back when I was 28. Some of my friends had moved away, some had gotten married, some had had kids—I had a hard time dealing with that. This time I'm 29, and I know I'm gonna be on the road until I'm 31. Fuck, I don't even wanna think about it.

They continued on this tour through the North America leg with Guns N' Roses and Metallica, before being fired from it in September 1992. Nirvana were originally intended to have Faith No More's spot on these shows with Guns N' Roses and Metallica, but their frontman Kurt Cobain turned down a personal invitation from Rose, due to his disdain for Guns N' Roses' macho image. Faith No More were at the August 8, 1992 show at the Olympic Stadium in Montreal, Canada, where Metallica's James Hetfield was badly burned by pyrotechnics. At this same show, Guns N' Roses incited a riot after turning up hours late and exiting early, which led to them being banned from the stadium for life. Towards the end of the tour, the band began talking negatively about Guns N' Roses in the press due to their behavior, with Patton joking to a publication that a show was cancelled since Rose found out actor Warren Beatty was having sex with his girlfriend. This was based on a real incident at a June 6, 1992 show in Paris, where Rose ranted about Beatty being a "cheap punk" and "washed up" since he incorrectly believed his model girlfriend Stephanie Seymour was having an affair with him. In other interviews, Patton joked about a psychic Rose took on tour with him named Sharon Maynard. Regarding their comments in the press, Patton said in 1992, "we've given up trying to be quiet about their stupid games. It's gotta come out somewhere. For a while we were a little cautious of saying anything, but we were uncomfortable with that. Did you know about the Warren Beatty thing? Then, for the last show of the European tour, Axl's psychic (who has her own bodyguard) went out and blessed his microphone and blessed the stage." Shortly after departing the tour, Bottum reflected on Guns N' Roses' lifestyle, saying "they'd comer pretty girls in the audience, and everyone would scream and yell at her until she lifted up her blouse and showed her tits. [If she refused] the whole audience would boo her. It happened every night. And at each stop on the tour, before Guns N' Roses would come to a town, they would have their crew arrive a day early and find the local club, where they'd give strippers backstage passes. Every night, the whole scenario was like millions of stripper chicks just hanging out waiting to do one of the band, or a roadie or whoever." In another 2015 interview, Bottum remembered Guns N' Roses had a backstage jacuzzi and a fake beach where they spent time with the strippers, saying "it was bananas. We just laughed at how fucking ridiculous they were."

After a September 2, 1992 concert at the Citrus Bowl in Orlando, Florida, Faith No More were confronted by Guns N' Roses guitarist Slash and Axl Rose, in response to the negative comments they were making in the press. Rose said to the band, "why do you hate me? It’s like I went away and came back home to find you guys fucked my wife", while Slash asserted that they should just leave if they didn't like being on the tour. Gould remembered another instance where the band went to Rose's room to apologize to him after they were caught talking negatively about Guns N' Roses in an interview. Gould said "we got busted one day, and we had to go apologize. It was like getting in the principal's office. We went and met Axl in his room, and to tell you the truth, he was super-cool and super-gracious. Then some guy comes in, and says: 'Now that everything's good, come over here'. We went into some trailer where there's some lesbian love act going on. It just blew the whole thing. It was so fucking gross that we were just like: 'Oh God.' We thought we came to some kind of meeting of the minds, and obviously, we hadn't." Before eventually getting fired in mid-September 1992, Gould said Faith No More had a band vote to decide whether they wanted to continue being on the tour with Guns N' Roses and Metallica. Gould personally voted against staying, but was outvoted by other members, including drummer Mike Bordin, who had a more positive view of Guns N' Roses and enjoyed being on the tour. In 1992, some publications reported that Faith No More had quit the tour rather than being fired from it.

Several years later, Patton admitted to peeing in Rose's teleprompter as a joke. Patton also admitted to placing his own excrement inside a chocolate cake in the catering area, hoping Rose would eat it. A crew member almost ate it instead before Patton stopped him. It has additionally been reported that Patton defecated in Rose's orange juice, although Gould claimed in 2016 that this never actually happened.

=== Second European and North American tour ===
After getting kicked off the tour with Guns N' Roses and Metallica, Faith No More did a month long U.S. tour with Helmet. Faith No More chose Helmet as a support act since they were fans of the band. Regarding these American shows, Patton told the Hartford Courant in October 1992. "we’re kind of learning how to relate to the audience, because for the whole Guns N' Roses tour we didn’t". Faith No More then split off on their own European tour in late October 1992. It included shows in Finland, Sweden, Denmark, Norway, seven performances from November 4–11 in Germany, the Czech Republic, Austria, 3 more performances in Germany, Belgium, Germany again and the Netherlands. For the European shows, they were supported by the female fronted band L7. They then toured the British Isles, and continued to be supported by L7. They toured Wales, England, where they played at the Cambridge Corn Exchange on November 23, then performed for three nights straight at the Brixton Academy from November 25–27 and on the following night at the NEC Arena in Birmingham, before going through Ireland and Scotland, where they played the first 4 nights of December in the Barrowland Ballroom. The band then went back through England, Belgium, had 3 performances from the December 8–10 in France, 3 performances from the December 12–14 in Spain, France again, Italy, Switzerland and Austria again before having a break for Christmas and New Year. On January 13, 1993, they performed "Midlife Crisis" on The Tonight Show with Jay Leno, which was taped in Burbank, California. They began touring America again in mid January 1993 in Seattle, Washington, and finishing in Utah a month later in mid February.

=== Pacific tour and return to Europe ===
From April to May 1993, the band embarked on a run of shows in the Pacific, first playing in Honolulu, Hawaii, and then on the islands of Guam and Saipan (which is part of the Northern Mariana Islands). These run of concerts concluded with a four show tour of Japan, a thirteen show tour of Australia and a two show tour of New Zealand (that was later extended to five shows). The Australian tour covered seven of the eight states and territories in the country, including the island state of Tasmania. The only state/territory that wasn't covered in the Australian tour was the remote Northern Territory. Following the performances in these countries, the band was going to tour Singapore, Hong Kong, and Indonesia in mid-May 1993, but cancelled these planned shows and instead did another three concerts on New Zealand's South Island. While in Guam during April 1993, Gould remembered that they went to a military bar that was showing hardcore pornography on the televisions, saying that later this bar started playing a karaoke version of "I Started a Joke", by British-Australian group the Bee Gees. A few years later, Faith No More released a studio cover of "I Started a Joke", with Gould claiming that the experience in Guam had inspired them to record the cover. He recalled in 2015, "it was like God speaking to us: 'You have to do this song.'"

The band returned to Europe for a show in Germany on May 29 and the following day in Vienna then in Budapest. On June 2 they played at Rotterdam Ahoy followed by 4 performances in Germany from June 3–7 and one in Slovakia on June 10. On June 14 and June 16, they played their first shows in Russia and the newly independent nation of Slovenia. Towards the end of June they performed on individual nights in Sweden, Denmark, Norway and Portugal then a few days later on July 3–4 in Torhout and Werchter, Belgium followed by one last show in Germany, on July 9, and a headline show at Ruisrock Festival in Turku, Finland July 10 before the final show of the tour in Stratford Upon Avon on July 17. The July 17, 1993 show was their last where Jim Martin was a member, with the final song of the set being "Epic". The band had planned to tour Peru, Brazil and Venezuela in August 1993, but these dates were cancelled due to the issues with Martin. The band did not perform another show until early 1995, after their next album King for a Day... Fool for a Lifetime had been recorded.

=== Live performances and setlists ===
Despite reportedly being unhappy with the band's change in direction on Angel Dust, Martin has since claimed that he was pleased with their live performances on the Angel Dust tour. He said in 2012, "live performances were always very strong. From my perspective, we came across a lot heavier than the records. Over time, the chord progressions and the arrangements would morph in subtle ways that would make the set heavier than the studio version."

The songs "Malpractice" and "Smaller and Smaller" were rarely or never played on the Angel Dust tour and subsequent tours. "Malpractice" would be performed a few times during the band's Second Coming Tour in 2009, before again being dropped from their setlist in following years. It has been claimed that "Malpractice" and "Smaller and Smaller" were both performed twice on the Angel Dust tour, although the details of these performances are in question, and no live recordings have ever surfaced. In a 2012 interview, Gould stated that they didn't perform "Smaller and Smaller" since it was mid-tempo in nature, and having too many of those types of songs in their setlist would make their shows "boring". Gould said, "for some reason or another, we tend to gravitate towards what is called 'mid-tempo' in our writing... In other words, songs that are not fast, but not exactly ballads either." He added that, "'Smaller and Smaller' while pretty grandiose in concept, always felt too long and too plodding to even consider doing live. And truth be told, we were never quite as attached to that one as some of the others."

During the tour, the band's intro music included "The Final Countdown" by Europe, "Foreplay" by Boston, "I Feel Love" by Donna Summer and the "Theme From Shaft" by Isaac Hayes, with the band also sometimes using the theme music from the television shows Get Smart and The Mod Squad. At their late 1991 shows in Japan and South America, they used Toto's Dune soundtrack song "Big Battle" as intro music. For outro music, they used "Garden" by Pearl Jam and "You Only Live Twice" by Nancy Sinatra at two separate shows in 1992. Faith No More covered snippets of various different songs from other artists during the touring cycle, including "Bad" by Michael Jackson, "Bring Me Edelweiss" by Edelweiss, "Christianity Is Stupid" by Negativeland, "The Goin' Gets Tough From the Getgo" by Ween, "Fat" by Weird Al Yankovic, "Finally" by CeCe Peniston, "Free Your Mind" by En Vogue, "Ha Ha Ha" by Flipper, "In Heaven" by David Lynch, "It Takes Two" by Rob Base & DJ E-Z Rock, "Jeremy" by Pearl Jam, "Jump Around" by House of Pain, "Keep on Loving You" by REO Speedwagon, "Life is a Highway" by Tom Cochrane, "Mistadobalina" by Del tha Funky Homosapien, "My Name Is Prince" by Prince, "Outshined" by Soundgarden, "Saturday Night" by The Bay City Rollers, "Sex Bomb" by Flipper, "Skinflowers" by The Young Gods, "So What'cha Want" by the Beastie Boys, "Stairway to Heaven" by Led Zeppelin, "Street Tuff" by Rebel MC, "Turned Out" by Helmet, "Two Princes" by Spin Doctors, "Two Tickets to Paradise" by Eddie Money, "Walk This Way" by Aerosmith, "Warm It Up" by Kris Kross, "Forward Ever Backward Never" by WestBam, "We Got the Beat" by The Go-Go's, "We Will Rock You" by Queen, "Under the Bridge" by the Red Hot Chili Peppers and "You Got It (The Right Stuff)" by The New Kids on the Block. Patton would later do a full cover of "Under the Bridge" with his other band Mr. Bungle, as part of a 1999 Halloween concert parodying the Red Hot Chili Peppers. Like on their previous tour for The Real Thing, Faith No More covered songs from commercials by Nestlé and German candy company Haribo during this tour. At a September 1991 show in Brazil, the band also covered a soccer chant; further, at several 1993 shows, they included covers of Angelo Badalamenti's theme to the television series Twin Peaks.

== Critical reception and legacy ==
Professional ratings
Review scores
Source	Rating
AllMusic	4.5/5 stars
Entertainment Weekly	B
Kerrang!	3/5
Los Angeles Times	3/4 stars
NME	8/10
Pitchfork	8.8/10
Q	4/5 stars
Record Collector	4/5 stars
Rolling Stone	4/5 stars
Select	5/5

Angel Dust was met with extensive critical acclaim. One critic wrote that the album is "one of the more complex and simply confounding records ever released by a major label" and similarly, another called it "the most uncommercial follow-up to a hit record ever". After hearing the album, the band's label warned them that releasing the album would be "commercial suicide". The single "A Small Victory" is described as a song "which seems to run Madame Butterfly through Metallica and Nile Rodgers, reveals a developing facility for combining unlikely elements into startlingly original concoctions".

The songs "Malpractice" and "Jizzlobber" have been called "art-damaged death metal" and "nerve-frazzling apocalyptic rock" by contrast with the "accordion-propelled" Midnight Cowboy theme cover that follows. AllMusic calls the album a "bizarro masterpiece", citing the vocals as "smarter and more accomplished" than its predecessor The Real Thing. It gave the album 4.5 stars out of 5, calling it one of their album picks. Kerrang! was less enthusiastic, considering Angel Dust's variety of styles "a personality disorder, of sorts, which undermines its potential greatness." In 1992, Spin commented that "there are slow, scary songs, and not as much funk-metal thrash as the average fan would expect." Entertainment Weekly gave it a B rating in 1992, commenting "is Angel Dust a brave slap in the face of record sales or a self-conscious attempt to unnerve newfound fans? Whatever it is, at least it’s not boring." In his 1992 review, Jon Pareles of The New York Times noted the album's variety of styles, writing, "for some stretches, Angel Dust could pass for a thrash metal album, all brutal guitars and bad news. But Faith No More can't keep a straight face or stick to a genre". He added that, "the music lurches from one sphere to another, simultaneously showing off the band's skill and suggesting that style choices are arbitrary."

The album was also called an "Album of the Year" in 1992 by seven different publications in four countries, making the top 10 in three of them and the top position in one, and was also named the "Most Influential Album of all Time" by Kerrang! despite an initially lukewarm review. Brad Filicky of CMJ New Music Report praised the album in 2003, reflecting, "Faith No More was often lumped in with the funk metal masses that were so popular in the early 90s, but after the success of The Real Thing, the group's first album with Mike Patton, FNM grew tired of the trappings and limitations of the genre. So, rather than release that era's equivalent of Significant Other, the band flipped the script entirely and dropped an experimental bombshell on the scene." In August 2002, Mark Reed of Drowned in Sound labelled it "one of the best rock albums ever made", and considered it to be influential on bands such as Deftones, Limp Bizkit and Linkin Park. The 2009 book Encyclopedia of Heavy Metal describes the album as "a notoriously difficult album to listen to aside from the radio-friendly cover of the Commodores' 'Easy'." Alex Tefler of The Philadelphia Inquirer referred to Angel Dust as "one of the most deliriously strange records ever to appear on a major label" in 2010.

In 2017, Rolling Stone ranked Angel Dust as 65th on their list of "The 100 Greatest Metal Albums of All Time". In March 2023, Rolling Stone also ranked the album's second track, "Caffeine", at number 55 on their "100 Greatest Heavy Metal Songs of All Time" list. In a 2018 Louder Sound article, Hoobastank singer Doug Robb listed it as one of the ten albums that changed his life, Oceansize frontman Mike Vennart has also named it one of the albums that changed his life. Killswitch Engage vocalist Jesse Leach told Louder Sound in 2020 that Angel Dust "changed my life and the way I saw music", claiming that it inspired him to incorporate melodic vocals into hardcore music. In 2003, System of a Down vocalist Serj Tankian called it their best album despite being less "commercially viable" than The Real Thing. He further noted that when he initially heard it in his mid-20s, it was the first hard rock music he was ever exposed to, which led to him becoming a fan of bands such as Metallica and Slayer. Mr. Bungle guitarist Trey Spruance labelled it as a "glorious record" in 2016. In a 2010 Artistdirect interview, Deftones vocalist Chino Moreno called it his favorite Faith No More album, saying "that was the record that made me think, 'This is one of the sickest bands.' The first album had a couple of good songs, but Angel Dust sounded savage to me. It sounded way more like a Mike Patton record. I feel like he had a lot more influence on it."

=== Appearances in other media ===
In 1994, the video for Faith No More's cover of "Easy" was used in the Beavis and Butt-Head episode "Rabies Scare". In 2002, "Be Aggressive" was featured in a Season 2 episode of the WB program Smallville, titled "Redux". The episode also featured the song "Ivanka", from Roddy Bottum's band Imperial Teen, which he formed in 1995. In October 2004, "Midlife Crisis" appeared in Tony Hawk's Underground 2. Later in October 2004, it appeared as one of the songs for the Radio X station in Grand Theft Auto: San Andreas. The game featured Axl Rose as the voice of a radio station host, however, Rose hosted the classic rock station K-DST, rather than Radio X, which focused on early 1990s rock music. In 2010, the song appeared as one of the tracks for the video game Rock Band 3.

== Track listing ==
All tracks are written by Faith No More (Mike Bordin, Roddy Bottum, Billy Gould, Jim Martin, and Mike Patton), except "Midnight Cowboy" written by John Barry.

No.	Title	Length
1.	"Land of Sunshine"	3:45
2.	"Caffeine"	4:29
3.	"Midlife Crisis"	4:19
4.	"RV"	3:41
5.	"Smaller and Smaller"	5:11
6.	"Everything's Ruined"	4:35
7.	"Malpractice"	4:02
8.	"Kindergarten"	4:31
9.	"Be Aggressive"	3:43
10.	"A Small Victory"	4:58
11.	"Crack Hitler"	4:40
12.	"Jizzlobber"	6:40
13.	"Midnight Cowboy" (instrumental)	4:13
Total length:		58:47

1993 re-release bonus track
No.	Title	Writer(s)	Length
14.	"Easy" (Commodores cover)	Lionel Richie	3:09

Japanese edition bonus tracks
No.	Title	Writer(s)	Length
14.	"Easy"	Richie	3:09
15.	"As the Worm Turns"	Bordin, Bottum, Gould, Martin, Chuck Mosley	2:39

2015 deluxe edition (disc 2)
No.	Title	Writer(s)	Length
1.	"Easy" (Cooler Version)	Richie	3:09
2.	"Das Schützenfest"		2:58
3.	"As the Worm Turns"	Bordin, Bottum, Gould, Martin, Mosley	2:41
4.	"Let's Lynch the Landlord"	Jello Biafra	2:55
5.	"Midlife Crisis" (Video Mix)		3:53
6.	"A Small Victory" (R-Evolution 23 (Full Moon) Mix)		7:21
7.	"Easy" (Live in Munich September 11, 1992)	Richie	3:12
8.	"Be Aggressive" (Live in Munich September 11, 1992)		3:42
9.	"Kindergarten" (Live in Munich September 11, 1992)		4:17
10.	"A Small Victory" (Live in Munich September 11, 1992)		4:52
11.	"Mark Bowen" (Live in Munich September 11, 1992)	Bordin, Bottum, Gould, Martin, Mosley	3:16
12.	"We Care a Lot" (Live in Munich September 11, 1992)	Bordin, Bottum, Gould, Martin, Mosley	3:59
13.	"Midlife Crisis" (Live in Dekalb, IL September 20, 1992)		3:34
14.	"Land of Sunshine" (Live in Dekalb, IL September 20, 1992)		3:38
15.	"Edge of the World" (Live in St. Louis, MO September 18, 1992)		3:16
16.	"RV" (Live in Dekalb, IL September 20, 1992)		3:52
17.	"The World Is Yours"		5:52
Total length:			68:06

== Bonus discs ==
There were several different bonus discs released with various editions and formats of the album.

=== Free Concert in the Park ===
This disc came with the third and fourth pressings of the Australian release, it contains four tracks labeled to be from a free concert at Munich, Germany on November 9, 1992. Although the date is correct, the venue is not, as it was recorded at Grugahalle Essen. (Cat no. D30953 and TVD93378 (RMD53378) respectively).

1. "Easy" – 3:06
2. "Be Aggressive" – 4:12
3. "Kindergarten" – 4:15
4. "Mark Bowen" – 3:17

=== Woodpecker from Mars ===
This disc was a promotional release on Limited Edition pressings of Angel Dust in France. On the back it reads "ne peut être vendu séparément, offert avec l'album 'Angel Dust' dans la limite des stocks disponibles", which translates to "offered with the album Angel Dust while stocks last, not to be sold separately"

1. "Woodpecker from Mars" (Live from Norwich, 1990)
2. "Underwater Love" (Live from Brixton, April 28, 1990)

=== Midlife Crisis 12" ===
This disc was released with limited edition UK LPs as a double vinyl pack. The first disc (with or without the bonus disc) lacked the tracks "Crack Hitler" and "Midnight Cowboy"; the track "Smaller and Smaller" appeared as the last track (Cat no. 828 326–1).

1. "Midlife Crisis (The Scream Mix)" – 3:56
2. "Crack Hitler" – 4:39
3. "Midnight Cowboy" – 4:13

=== Interview disc ===
This disc was a promotional release on Limited Edition pressings of Angel Dust in Europe released on August 24, 1992 (Cat no. 828 321–2), and was also released separately in a slimline case (Cat no. FNMCD3). The questions were printed inside the packaging with answers on the CD listing 18:41.

Track list
No.	Title	Length
1.	"Its three years since your last studio album. Are you nervous about releasing the new album?"
2.	"How do you feel about releasing Angel Dust?"
3.	"What inspired Angel Dust?"
4.	"When did you start recording Angel Dust?"
5.	"What was your major concern when you came to record the album?"
6.	"Was it an enjoyable experience recording Angel Dust?"
7.	"What frame of mind were you in when you recorded Angel Dust?"
8.	"What difference did it make this time round having mike involved from the very start of the project?"
9.	"Is there anything you weren't happy about?"
10.	"The title Angel Dust is not a track on the album. What's the story behind it?"
11.	"What made you choose the title of the album?"
12.	"Where does the inspiration come for your songs?"
13.	"Do you all usually agree on the songs?"
14.	"How do you write your songs?"
15.	"Do you deliberately set out to provoke with your songs?"
16.	"Did you record much material for the album?"
17.	"Why did you choose to do a cover of 'midnight cowboy'?"
18.	"What is "Crack Hitler" about?"
19.	"What's "A Small Victory" about?"
20.	"Why did you choose to work with producer Matt Wallace again?"
21.	"How does Angel Dust compare to your last studio album The Real Thing?"
22.	"What changes have taken place between the two albums?"
23.	"Do you think you diluted or compromised your sound in a way to make it more commercially palatable?"
24.	"What do you think the press will have to say about Angel Dust?"
25.	"Are you affected by what the critics say?"
26.	"How do you feel about fame?"
27.	"What difference has success made to you?"
28.	"Do you think your original fans have stuck by you as you've moved up the scale?"
29.	"Do you get nervous playing stadium gigs in front of thousands of fans?"
30.	"What was your worst ever gig?"
31.	"Does the band have a sense of humour?"

== Personnel ==
Personnel taken from Angel Dust liner notes.

Faith No More

- Mike Bordin – drums
- Roddy Bottum – keyboards
- Billy Gould – bass
- Jim Martin – guitar
- Mike Patton – vocals

Production

- Matt Wallace – producer, engineer, mixing
- David Bryson – co-mixing
- Adam Munoz, Craig Doubet, Gibbs Chapman, Lindsay Valentine, Nikki Tafrallin – assistant engineering
- John Golden – mastering
- Kim Champagne – artwork direction
- Ross Halfin – band photo
- Wernher Krutein – bird photo, Red Square photo adaptation
- Mark Burnstein – meat photo

== Accolades ==
Accolades for Angel Dust
Year	Publication	Country	Accolade	Rank
1992	Musik Express Sounds	Germany	"Albums of the Year"	1
1992	Raw	United Kingdom	"Albums of the Year"	8
1992	Vox	United Kingdom	"Albums of the Year"	10
1992	The Face	United Kingdom	"Albums of the Year"	17
1992	The Village Voice	United States	"Albums of the Year"	26
1992	Muziekkrant OOR	Netherlands	"Albums of the Year"	36
1992	Q	United Kingdom	"Albums of the Year"	*
1995	Raw	United Kingdom	"90 Essential Albums of the 90s"	*
1996	Visions	Germany	"The Best Albums 1991–96"	*
1999	Visions	Germany	"The Most Important Albums of the 90s"	22
2000	Terrorizer	United Kingdom	"The 100 Most Important Albums of the 90s"	*
2003	Kerrang!	United Kingdom	"50 Most Influential Albums of All Time"	1
2022	Guitar World	United States	"The 30 greatest rock guitar albums of 1992"	2
"*" denotes an unordered list.

== Charts ==
=== Weekly charts ===
Weekly chart performance for Angel Dust
Chart (1992)	Peak position
Australian Albums (ARIA)	4
Austrian Albums (Ö3 Austria)	4
Canada Top Albums/CDs (RPM)	12
Dutch Albums (Album Top 100)	22
German Albums (Offizielle Top 100)	8
Hungarian Albums (MAHASZ)	35
New Zealand Albums (RMNZ)	6
Norwegian Albums (VG-lista)	7
Swedish Albums (Sverigetopplistan)	18
Swiss Albums (Schweizer Hitparade)	9
UK Albums (Official Charts)	2
US Billboard 200	10

Chart (2026)	Peak position
Greek Albums (IFPI)	11

=== Year-end charts ===
Year-end chart performance for Angel Dust
Chart (1992)	Position
Austrian Albums (Ö3 Austria)	33
German Albums (Offizielle Top 100)	47
Swiss Albums (Schweizer Hitparade)	38

== Certifications ==
Certifications for Angel Dust
Region	Certification	Certified units/sales
Australia (ARIA)	Gold	35,000^{^}
Canada (Music Canada)	Platinum	100,000^{^}
Germany (BVMI)	Gold	250,000^{^}
New Zealand (RMNZ)	Gold	7,500^{^}
United Kingdom (BPI)	Gold	100,000^{^}
United States (RIAA)	Gold	500,000^{^}
^{^} Shipments figures based on certification alone.

== Release histories ==
- In 2008 Mobile Fidelity Sound Lab remastered re-released Angel Dust on CD and LP.

=== Vinyl history ===
Vinyl release history for Angel Dust
Region	Date	Label	Catalog	Notes
United Kingdom	June 8, 1992	Slash, London	828 326-1	Limited edition, includes the Midlife Crisis 12".
United Kingdom	June 8, 1992	Slash, London	828 401-1	Does not include tracks 11 & 13
United Kingdom	June 8, 1992	Slash, London	828 321-1	Does not include tracks 11 & 13
Netherlands		Slash, London	828 321-1	Does not include tracks 11 & 13
Germany		Slash, London	828 321-1	Does not include tracks 11 & 13
Colombia		Slash, London	828 321-1	Does not include tracks 11 & 13
Brazil		Slash, London, PolyGram	828 321-1	Does not include tracks 11 & 13

=== CD history ===
CD release history for Angel Dust
Region	Date	Label	Catalog	Pressing	Notes
United States	June 16, 1992	Slash, Reprise	9 26785-2	First	
Canada	June 16, 1992	Slash, Reprise	CD 26785-2	First	
United Kingdom	June 8, 1992	Slash, London	828 321-2	First	Early copies came with the Interview bonus disc.
Germany	June 8, 1992	Slash, London	828 321-2	First	
France	June 8, 1992	Slash, London	828 321-2	First	Early copies came with the Woodpecker from Mars disc.
Brazil		London, PolyGram	828 321-2	First	
Australia		Slash, Liberation	TVD93363 RMD53363	First	'Red Square' picture disc.
Japan	June 12, 1992	Slash, London	POCD-1081	First	with extra track "As the Worm Turns".
South Africa		Slash, RPM	CDSLASH2	First	
Czechoslovakia		Slash, London, Globus	210 134-2	First	Gold Edition, 1000 individually numbered copies with gold discs.
United Kingdom	January 29, 1993	Slash, London	828 401-2	Second	with extra track "Easy".
Japan		Slash, London	POCD-1111	Second	with extra tracks "Easy" and "As the Worm Turns".
Brazil		London, PolyGram	828 401-2	Second	with extra track "Easy".
Australia		Slash, Liberation	D30953 PRD93/7	Second	'Bird photo' picture disc with "Easy" and Free Concert in the Park.
Australia		Slash, Liberation	TVD93378 RMD53378	Third	'Bird photo' picture disc with "Easy" and Free Concert in the Park.
Australia		Slash, London	828 401-2	Third	Polydor generation re-release
United Kingdom		Slash, Liberation	TVD93378 RMD53378	Third	'Bird photo' picture disc with "Easy" and Free Concert in the Park.
United Kingdom		Slash, Liberation	3984 28200 2	Third	with extra track "Easy".
United States	July 2008	MoFi, Rhino	UDCD 787	First	Album has been completely remastered from the original master tapes by Rob LoVerde at Mobile Fidelity Sound Lab under license from Warner Bros. Incorporated. Manufactured by Rhino. Does not contain extra track "Easy".

=== Cassette history ===
Cassette release history for Angel Dust
Region	Date	Label	Catalog	Notes
United States	June 8, 1992	Slash, Reprise	9 26785-4	Early copies came in a rectangular LP art picture box.
United Kingdom	June 8, 1992	Slash, London	828 321-4	
Germany	June 8, 1992	Slash, London	828 321-4	
France	June 8, 1992	Slash, London	828 321-4	
Brazil		Slash, London	828 321-4	
Australia		Slash, Liberation	??? ???	
Brazil		London, PolyGram	828 401-4	Second pressings with extra track "Easy"
United Kingdom	January 29, 1993	Slash, London		Second pressings with extra track "Easy"
Poland		PolyGram		Second pressings with extra track "Easy"

== Notes ==
- Chirazi, Steffan; Faith No More (1994). The Real Story. Castle Communications PLC. ISBN 1-898141-15-0.
