= InCrest =

Danish rock band

- Origin: Copenhagen, Denmark
- Genres: Alternative rock
- Years active: 2003-present
- Labels: Blackwood Records
- Members: Marcie; Anderson; Jones
- Past members: Jonees

InCrest is an alternative rock band formed in 2003. The band consists of founding vocalist and guitarist Marcie, bassist Anderson and founding drummer Jones. The group's debut album Rubicon Atlas was released November 28, 2014, followed by a Scandinavian tour and Indian Tour. The first single Nightcrawler from the group's sequel album came out early on August 1, 2018. The full second studio album entitled The Ladder The Climb The Fall was released September 15, 2018.

== Discography ==
=== Studio albums ===
- Rubicon Atlas (2014)
- The Ladder The Climb The Fall (2018)

=== Singles ===
- Jenna Lynn (2014)
- Even Though (2015)
- Changing Time (2015)
- Nightcrawler (2018)
- Aces (2019)

=== Music videos ===
- Jenna Lynn (2014)
- Even Though (2015)
- Changing Time (2015)
- Nightcrawler (2018)
- Aces (2019)
