= Anything But Joey =

- Also known as: M.I.P.; Thulium
- Origin: Kansas City, Missouri, United States
- Genres: Pop-Rock
- Years active: 1995–2005
- Spinoffs: Stuck On Broadway; The Famed
- Past members: Matt Groebe (vocals); Drew Scofield (bass); Bryan Chesen (guitar); Jeff Polaschek (drums); Wes Keely (drums); Steve Nick (Guitar in Thulium)

Anything But Joey was a pop-rock band from the Kansas City area. For the majority of its existence, the band was made up of high school friends Matt Groebe (lead vocals), Drew Scofield (bass/backing vocals), Jeff Polaschek (drums), and Bryan Chesen (guitar).

== Band history ==
=== Thulium ===
The band formed in the summer of 1995, under the name M.I.P. After playing their first show, they decided to change their name to Thulium, after the 69th element on the Periodic Table of Elements. In December 1996, Thulium recorded and released a four-song demo called The Blue Tape. However, due to college commitments, the band saw little activity. During this slow period, they added second guitarist Steve Nick and made two more recordings. A self-titled album in 1997 (sometimes called the "white album") and an EP called Mars Needs Pimps Too the next year.

After college, things for the band began to pick up speed and they again returned to the studio. With producer J. Hall, Thulium recorded their second album, The Secret Club, in two weeks. The title refers to other bands in the Kansas City music scene that were more popular, such as The Get Up Kids, The Anniversary, and The Creature Comforts. Thulium felt these bands looked down on them because of the different style of music they played. With a new record, they began playing more local shows and touring regionally. In April 2001, Steve parted ways with the band, citing creative differences. Thulium would continue touring heavily, taking short breaks to record a few songs here and there.

=== Name change ===
In 2002, the band decided to change its name from Thulium to Anything But Joey (ABJ). With the name change came more success. Their song "Girl Roommate" became the most requested song on KRBZ 96.5 FM. With a local radio hit, Anything But Joey released a new album, Come Out Fighting, in December 2002. Come Out Fighting also produced other fan favorites such as "One" and "Girls Like You," although "Girl Roommate" was the only radio hit. In June, 2003, the group was the subject of a cover story for the Kansas City alternative weekly, The Pitch. The article described the growing "Joeymania" in the wake of "Girl Roommate." The next few years saw the band touring heavily, opening for Jimmy Eat World in Kansas City and playing a few dates on the 2003 Vans Warped Tour. They released another 4 song EP, Necessary, But Not Cool, in late 2004.

=== Break up ===
In late 2004, Jeff left the band and was replaced by former Walls of Jericho drummer Wes Keely. However, this line-up didn't last long. In January 2005, Anything But Joey announced that they were breaking up. After almost 10 years together, the members wanted to explore new things. Matt, Bryan, and Wes formed a harder styled emo/goth band called The Famed. Drew reunited with former guitarist Steve Nick to form another pop-rock band called Stuck On Broadway. Jeff later joined Stuck On Broadway after their original drummer quit.

Anything But Joey has reunited a few times since their breakup to open for their friends, such as St. Louis band Ludo.

"Sight Reading" from the "Come Out Fighting" album was used in the trailer for the 2007 film "Meet Bill."

== Band members ==
- Drew Scofield - Bass, Backing Vocals (1995–2005)
- Matt Groebe - Lead Vocals, Synth (1995–2005)
- Bryan Chesen - Lead Guitar, Backing Vocals (1995–2005)
- Jeff Polaschek - Drums (1995–2004, returned for farewell tour)
- Wes Keely - Drums (2004)
- Steve Nick (in Thulium) - Rhythm guitar (1996–2001)

== Discography ==
=== Albums ===
As Thulium

- Thulium
- The Secret Club

As Anything But Joey

- Come Out Fighting

=== Demos and EPs ===
As Thulium

- The Blue Tape
- Mars Needs Pimps Too

As Anything But Joey

- Necessary, But Not Cool

=== Videos ===
- "Girl Roommate"
