= Quiet in Heaven/Song of Liberty =

1983 single by Faith No Man

"Quiet in Heaven" "Song of Liberty"
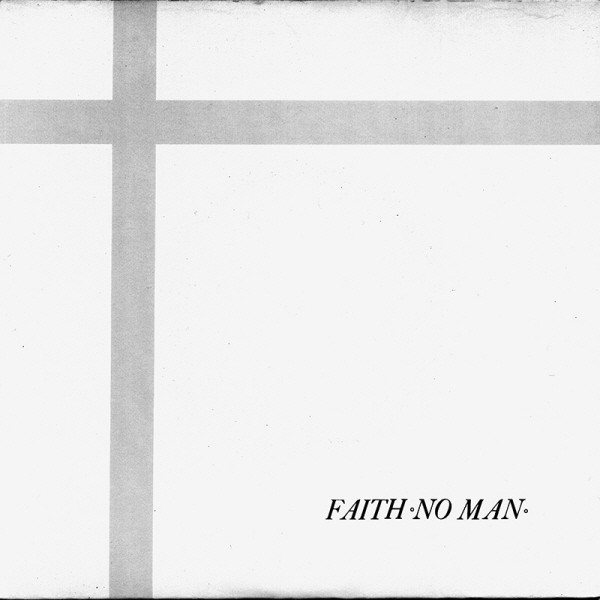
- Front cover of the US single

Single by Faith. No Man.
- Released: 1983
- Studio: Dangerous Rhythm (Moraga, California)
- Genre: Post-punk
- Length: 9:23
- Label: Ministry of Propaganda FNM1
- Songwriter: Mike Morris
- Producer: Matt Wallace

Faith. No Man. singles chronology
"Quiet in Heaven" "Song of Liberty" (1983)	"Chinese Arithmetic" (1987)

Back cover
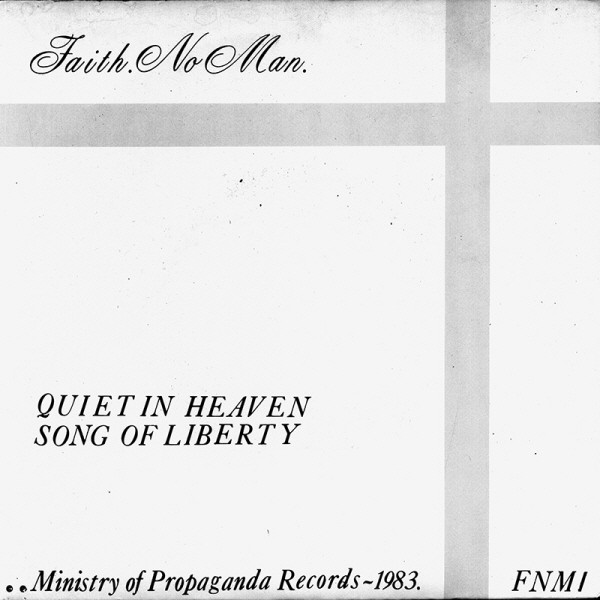
- Back cover of the US single

"Quiet in Heaven"/"Song of Liberty" is a 1983 double A-side single by the American post-punk band Faith. No Man. Recorded at producer Matt Wallace's home studio, the single was the band's only release before the majority of its members left to form Faith No More the following year; keyboard player Wade Worthington had already been replaced between the single's recording and its release.

Both songs were written by singer and guitarist Mike Morris, who is also credited with the single's artwork—including a picture of Adolf Hitler wearing a tutu on the record's A-side. The music has been favorably reviewed since its release, with the group being compared to Joy Division, Public Image Ltd and Killing Joke.

== Production ==
Faith. No Man. had begun life in 1981 under the name Sharp Young Men, comprising the lineup of singer and guitarist Mike Morris, bass player Billy Gould, drummer Mike Bordin and keyboard player Wade Worthington. Morris and Worthington had played together in a previous band named The Spectators, opening for shows by XTC and Dead Kennedys, and recruited the other members after advertising for their new band in a Berkeley, California record store. Morris acted as the group's primary songwriter, and penned several original songs for their early performances; "Quiet in Heaven", "Decay", "Life Is Tough for Me", "Under the Gun", and "Song of Liberty"—the latter two of which he has since described as "hitting [his] mark" as a writer.

Still operating under the Sharp Young Men name, the group recorded three songs in Matt Wallace's Dangerous Rhythm Studios, located in the garage of his parents' home in Moraga, California. Between the time of the recording session and the release of the single, Worthington quit the band and was replaced on keyboards by Gould's childhood friend Roddy Bottum; the group's name was also changed to Faith. No Man. around this time. After touring California throughout early 1983, Bottum, Gould and Bordin quit the band shortly after and formed Faith No More without any constant guitarists or vocalists until they eventually settled on Chuck Mosley and Jim Martin.

The single has been long out of print, making it very difficult to find. The artwork, which was credited to Morris, features amongst other things an edited picture of Adolf Hitler wearing a tutu on the A-side of the disc.

== Reception ==
"Quiet in Heaven"/"Song of Liberty" was released in 1983 on the band's own label, Ministry of Propaganda, and initially attracted the attention of punk collective Crass and the English record label On-U Sound Records; however the band had dissolved before they could be signed to any deal.

Reviews of the single have largely been favorable. A contemporary review in the September 1983 edition of punk zine Maximumrocknroll by Jeff Bale described the single as "quite good", comparing Faith. No Man. to Killing Joke and explaining their sound as "heavy bass- and drum-oriented post punk". In a retrospective review, AllMusic's Bradley Torreano gave the release a rating of three stars out of five describing Morris's vocals as "actually really good" and called the lyrical content "typical angry San Francisco punk topics: they hate the government, they hate their girlfriends, and they're terribly unsatisfied". Torreano felt that the record sounded better than Faith No More's 1985 début, We Care a Lot, describing it as a "solid post-punk/pre-goth single in general" and comparing Morris' vocals to Public Image Ltd's John Lydon. Similar comparisons were also raised by journalist Adrian Harte in Small Victories: The True Story of Faith No More, describing the release as "a fair approximation of Joy Division fronted by Public Image Ltd-era John Lydon". Billy Gould has subsequently described the single, and Faith. No Man.'s other songs, as being "a little more derivative of what was happening in Great Britain [...] Theatre of Hate, Killing Joke, that kind of thing".

== Track listing ==
All tracks are written by Mike Morris.

No.	Title	Length
1.	"Quiet in Heaven"	5:31
2.	"Song of Liberty"	3:52
Total length:		9:23

== Personnel ==
Personnel taken from Quiet in Heaven/Song of Liberty liner notes.

Faith. No Man.

- Mike Morris – vocals, guitar, sleeve design
- William Gould – bass
- Wade Worthington – keyboards
- Mike "Puffy" Bordin – drums

Additional personnel

- Matt Wallace – producer

== Footnotes ==
=== References ===
- Chirazi, Steffan (1994). The Real Story. Castle Communications PLC. ISBN 1-898141-15-0.
- Harte, Adrian (2018). Small Victories: The True Story of Faith No More. Jawbone Press. ISBN 978-1911036371.
