= Matt Wallace (music producer) =

American record producer

- Born: Tulsa, Oklahoma
- Genres: Rock
- Occupations: Musician, producer, audio engineer, mixer
- Years active: 1982 - present
- Website: mcdman.com/wallace

Matt Wallace is an American record producer, audio engineer, and mixer, best known for his work with Faith No More, Maroon 5, O.A.R., The Replacements, and Train.

== Career ==
Wallace is a graduate of the University of California at Berkeley, where he was studying to become an English teacher. While attending college, he set up a music recording studio in his parents' garage in Moraga, California which he named Dangerous Rhythm Studios.

In 1983, Sharp Young Men recorded "Quiet in Heaven/Song of Liberty" at Dangerous Rhythm. The single was released under the band's new name of Faith. No Man., its only release before the majority of its members left to form Faith No More the following year. Wallace relocated Dangerous Rhythm Studios to Oakland, California and hired Kevin Army, who later bought the studio from Wallace. In 1985, Wallace produced Faith No More's debut album We Care a Lot and returned to work with the band for Introduce Yourself (1987).

Wallace relocated to Los Angeles in 1988 and worked for Slash Records as a staff producer and A&R person. He lobbied to produce The Replacements album Don't Tell a Soul (1989). The same year, he again worked with Faith No More, producing and mixing their breakthrough album The Real Thing, which featured the hit song, "Epic," as well as its follow-up, Angel Dust, named the #1 most influential album of all time by Kerrang! in 2003.

He produced Paul Westerberg's album 14 Songs and John Hiatt's album Perfectly Good Guitar. He co-produced the debut Juno-nominated album for Canadian singer-songwriter Chantal Kreviazuk. The album was certified double platinum in Canada.

Wallace produced and mixed Songs About Jane, the debut album for Maroon 5, including the Top 40 hit singles "Harder To Breathe," "This Love," "Sunday Morning," and "She Will Be Loved." The album has sold over 20 million copies worldwide, streamed over 1 billion times on Spotify, and won a Grammy Award for "Best New Artist" in 2005.

Since then, Wallace has co-written songs and produced two albums for O.A.R. He has also co-written and produced several songs for Andy Grammer, an album for Pepper, and mixed Blackberry Smoke's album The Whippoorwill.

In 2015, Wallace joined Faith No More again to co-mix their album, Sol Invictus. The album debuted at number 1 on the Billboard Hard Rock Album chart. It was named the "#2 Best Metal Album of 2015" by Rolling Stone, and won Metal Hammer's Golden Gods Award for "Best Album."

Wallace established the Studio Delux recording studio, located in the Sound City Studios complex in Van Nuys, California. In 2021, it was verified as a Dolby Atmos Music Studio.

== Live at Studio Delux ==
In 2013, Wallace started a live music project with Will Kennedy (whose credits include Michael Franti, Thirsty Merc, Andy Grammer, and Pepper) called 'Live at Studio Delux'. The goal is to help music fans discover the joy of authentic live performances. With over 30 years of combined experience professionally recording and producing music, Wallace and Kennedy capture the artist at their best in a live studio environment. Each artist session is recorded in one day at Wallace's own studio, Studio Delux. The mastered recordings are made available on iTunes while video content can be watched on the project's YouTube channel.

== ATMOS Mixer credits ==
| Artist | Album or single |
|---|---|
| A Perfect Circle | "Starless" |
| Sarah McLachlan | Better Broken |
| Des Rocs | "I Am The Lightning" |
| Jade Bird | Who Wants To Talk About Love |
| Brandee Younger | Gadabout Season |
| Triada | De Versiones y Alma |
| Hamilton Leithauser | This Side of the Island |
| The Strumbellas | Part Time Believer |
| VALÉ | Under The Sun |
| Dave Matthews Band | Walk Around The Moon |
| Grouplove | I Want it All |
| Foreigner | Records |
| Jason Mraz | "The Remedy" |
| Jason Mraz | Lalalalovesongs |
| The B-52's | "Love Shack," "Roam" |
| The Romantics | "Talking In Your Sleep," "One In A Million" |
| Faith No More | "Epic," "Easy," "Midlife Crisis" |
| Dio | Holy Diver |
| Dave Matthews Band | Remember Two Things |
| Black Sabbath | Live Evil |
| Quiet Riot | "Metal Health," "Cum On Feel The Noize" |
| Jason Mraz | Waiting For My Rocket To Come |
| The Used | "The Taste Of Ink," "Buried Myself Alive," "I Caught Fire," "All That I've Got," "The Bird and the Worm" |
| Kid Rock | "Bawitdaba," "All Summer Long" |
| Tank and the Bangas | "Outside," "There Goes the Neighborhood" |
| I Prevail | "Bodybag" |
| Ruston Kelly | The Weakness |
| Daniel Powter | "Bad Day" |
| Selena Gomez | A Year Without Rain |
| Selena Gomez | When the Sun Goes Down |
| Ondara | Spanish Villager No. 3 |
| Comet Is Coming | Hyper-Dimensional Expansion Beam |
| Shabaka | Afrikan Culture |
| Chicocurlyhead | Diadreamer |
| Nina Simone | "Feeling Good (remix)" |
| Gwyn | Dreamcrusher "I Beat U 2 It" |
| Vienna Tang | “We’ve Got You (i-Spark)” and “We’ve Got You (ii-Comfort)” |
| Toby Fox | Deltarune Original Game Soundtracks |
| Dead Sea Squirrels | original music from the animated series |
| Video Game Jazz Orchestra | Hang on to Your Hat |
| Bleu | Echo Chamber |
| Willy Porter | Humans in a Room |
| Slightly Stoopid | "Got Me On The Run" |
| Stephen Marley | "I Shot The Sheriff" |
| Norotious B.I.G. | "Notorious Thugs" |
| Staind | Break The Cycle |
| Arooj Aftab | "Aey Nehin," "Whiskey" |
| Sarah Kinsley | "Lovegod," "Black Horse," "Sliver of Time," "Ascension" |

== Production and Mixer credits ==
| Artist | Album name | Year |
|---|---|---|
| Slipknot | "Arsenal" | 2026 |
| Willy Porter | Humans in a Room | 2025 |
| Mushroomhead | Call the Devil | 2024 |
| Des Rocs | Dream Machine | 2023 |
| The Revelries | The Revelries | 2022 |
| The Replacements | Dead Man's Pop | 2019 |
| The Jacks | The Jacks | 2019 |
| Nat & Alex Wolff | Glue | 2020 |
| Mushroomhead | A Wonderful Life | 2020 |
| Eric Gales | The Bookends | 2019 |
| InCrest | The Ladder The Climb The Fall | 2018 |
| New Beat Fund | Sponge Fingerz | 2016 |
| Zen From Mars | New Leaf | 2015 |
| Wagakki Band | Hangeki no Yaiba | 2015 |
| R5 | Sometime Last Night | 2015 |
| Los Angelics | Land of the Brave and Dangerous | 2015 |
| Faith No More | Sol Invictus | 2015 |
| 3 Doors Down | Us and the Night | 2015 |
| Andy Grammer | "Co-Pilot" | 2014 |
| Tommy & The High Pilots | Only Human | 2013 |
| Pepper | Pepper | 2013 |
| Trail | To The Rest Of The World | 2012 |
| O.A.R. | King | 2011 |
| Nat & Alex Wolff | Black Sheep | 2011 |
| Blackberry Smoke | The Whippoorwill | 2011 |
| Andy Grammer | Andy Grammer | 2011 |
| Thirsty Merc | Mousetrap Heart | 2010 |
| Ludo | Prepare the Preparations | 2010 |
| The Dollyrots | California Beach Boy | 2010 |
| Eye Alaska | Genesis Underground | 2009 |
| The 88 | Not Only... But Also | 2008 |
| Small Mercies | Beautiful Hum | 2008 |
| O.A.R. | All Sides | 2008 |
| Ludo | You're Awful, I Love You | 2008 |
| Eva Avila | Give Me the Music | 2008 |
| The Higher | On Fire | 2007 |
| Fightstar | One Day Son, This Will All Be Yours | 2007 |
| Udora | Liberty Square | 2005 |
| Spin Doctors | Nice Talking to Me | 2005 |
| Kyle Riabko | Before I Speak | 2005 |
| Josh Kelley | Almost Honest | 2005 |
| Virginia Coalition | OK to Go | 2004 |
| Squad Five-O | Late News Breaking | 2004 |
| Caleb Kane | Go Mad | 2004 |
| Automatic Black | De-Evolution | 2004 |
| As Fast As | Open Letter to the Damned | 2004 |
| Mushroomhead | XIII | 2003 |
| Wakefield | American Made | 2003 |
| 6Gig | Mind Over Mind | 2003 |
| Maroon 5 | Songs About Jane | 2002 |
| Sugarcult | Start Static | 2001 |
| H_{2}O | Go | 2001 |
| Blues Traveler | Bridge | 2001 |
| Ultra V | Bring on the Fuego | 2000 |
| Poe | Haunted | 2000 |
| Peter Searcy | Could You Please and Thank You | 2000 |
| Buffalo Nickel | Long 33 1/3 Play | 2000 |
| Bowling for Soup | Let's Do It for Johnny! | 2000 |
| Portable | Secret Life | 1999 |
| Mars Electric | Someday | 1999 |
| Khaleel | People Watching | 1999 |
| Fenix TX | Fenix TX | 1999 |
| Everlast | So Long | 1999 |
| DDT | Urban Observer | 1999 |
| Weapon of Choice | Nutmeg Phantasy | 1998 |
| Train | If You Leave | 1998 |
| Imperial Teen | What Is Not to Love | 1998 |
| Green Apple Quick Step | New Disaster | 1998 |
| The Honeyrods | The Honeyrods | 1997 |
| Dog's Eye View | Daisy | 1997 |
| Bic Runga | Drive | 1997 |
| Weapon of Choice | Highperspice | 1996 |
| Susanna Hoffs | Susanna Hoffs | 1996 |
| Josh Clayton-Felt | Inarticulate Nature Boy | 1996 |
| Howlin' Maggie | Honeysuckle Strange | 1996 |
| Deftones | Teething | 1996 |
| Chantal Kreviazuk | Under These Rocks and Stones | 1996 |
| R.E.M. | Revolution | 1995 |
| Ednaswap | Ednaswap | 1995 |
| John Hiatt | Hiatt Comes Alive at Budokan? | 1994 |
| Paul Westerberg | 14 Songs | 1993 |
| School of Fish | Human Cannonball | 1993 |
| John Hiatt | Perfectly Good Guitar | 1993 |
| The Spent Poets | The Spent Poets | 1992 |
| Faith No More | Angel Dust | 1992 |
| The Toll | Sticks and Stones and Broken Bones | 1991 |
| Sons of Freedom | Gump | 1991 |
| Faith No More | You Fat Bastards: Live at the Brixton Academy | 1991 |
| Chagall Guevara | Chagall Guevara | 1991 |
| The Wild Flowers | Tales Like These | 1990 |
| David Baerwald | Bedtime Stories | 1990 |
| Lock Up | Something Bitchin' This Way Comes | 1989 |
| The Replacements | Don't Tell a Soul | 1989 |
| Faith No More | The Real Thing | 1989 |
| Sons of Freedom | Sons of Freedom | 1988 |
| New Monkees | What I Want | 1987 |
| Faith No More | Introduce Yourself | 1987 |
| Faith No More | We Care a Lot | 1985 |
| Necropolis of Love | The Hope | 1984 |
| Faith. No Man | "Quiet in Heaven"/"Song of Liberty" | 1983 |

== Awards and nominations ==
| Artist | Work / Recording name | Award | Result | Credit |
|---|---|---|---|---|
| Eric Gales | The Bookends | Blues Music Award: Blues Rock Artist of the Year | Won | Producer, Engineer, Co-Mixer |
| Faith No More | Sol Invictus | Metal hammer Golden God Award Best Album | Won | Mixer |
| Crash Parallel | Sunset In Reverse | Canadian Radio Music Award Best New Group | Won | Producer, Engineer |
| Small Mercies | Beautiful Hum | ARIA Breakthrough Artist of the Year | Nominated | Producer |
| Maroon 5 | Songs About Jane | Grammy Best New Artist | Won | Producer, Engineer, Mixer |
| Maroon 5 | This Love | Grammy Best Pop Performance | Won | Producer, Engineer, Mixer |
| Maroon 5 | She Will Be Loved | Grammy Best Pop Performance | Nominated | Producer, Engineer, Mixer |
| Faith No More | Angel Dust | Grammy Best Hard Rock Performance | Nominated | Producer, Engineer, Mixer |
| Faith No More | The Real Thing | Grammy Best Metal Performance | Nominated | Producer, Engineer, Mixer |
| Faith No More | The Real Thing | Grammy Best Hard Rock Performance | Nominated | Producer, Engineer, Mixer |
| Faith No More | Falling to Pieces | Grammy Best Visual Effects in a Video | Won | Producer, Engineer, Mixer |
