= Live from London 2006 =

Video by The Fantômas Melvins Big Band
- Released: August 26, 2008
- Recorded: May 1, 2006; London, England
- Length: 78:13
- Label: Ipecac Recordings (IPC102) (DVD)
- Director: Douglas Pledger

Fantômas chronology
Animali In Calore Surriscaldati Con Ipertermia Genitale/Cat in Red (2005)	Live from London 2006 (2008)

Melvins chronology
Nude with Boots (2008)	The Fantômas Melvins Big Band (2008)	Chicken Switch (2009)

Live from London 2006 is a DVD by the Fantômas Melvins Big Band that was released on August 26, 2008.

== Track listing ==
1. "Sacrifice" (Flipper cover from Gone Fishin')
2. "Page 27" (from Fantômas's Fantômas)
3. "Night Goat" (from The Melvins' Houdini)
4. "Page 28" (from Fantômas Fantômas)
5. "Page 3" (from FantômasFantômas)
6. "Electric Long Thin Wire"
7. "The Bit" (from Melvins Stag)
8. "Page 14" (from Fantômas Fantômas)
9. "Pigs of the Roman Empire" (from the Melvins/Lustmord album Pigs of the Roman Empire)
10. "The Omen" (from Fantômas The Director's Cut)
11. "Hooch" (from Melvins Houdini)
12. "Mombius Hibachi" (from Melvins Honky)
13. "Page 23" (from Fantômas Fantômas)
14. "Skin Horse" (from Melvins Stag)
15. "Cape Fear" (from Fantômas The Director's Cut)
16. "Let It All Be" (from Melvins The Bootlicker)
17. "Lowrider" (War cover from Why Can't We Be Friends?)
18. "04/02/05 Saturday" (from Fantômas Suspended Animation)
19. "Page 29" (from Fantômas Fantômas)
20. "04/08/05 Friday" (from Fantômas Suspended Animation)
21. "Spider Baby" (from Fantômas The Director's Cut)

== Extras ==
- "Secret" Commentary with Buzz Osborne, Dale Crover, Ipecac co-owner/founder Greg Werckman, booking agent Robby Fraser, and special guest and fan Danny DeVito.

== Personnel ==
- Dale Crover - drums
- Trevor Dunn - bass, backing vocals
- Dave Lombardo - drums, electronics, programming
- Buzz Osborne - guitar, vocals, keyboards
- Mike Patton - vocals, keyboards, electronics, programming
- David Scott Stone - guitar, bass, electric long thin wires, samples
- Filmed by Douglas Pledger, Matthew Rozeik & Alex Gunnis
- Edited by Douglas Pledger, sound by Matthew Rozeik
- Directed by Douglas Pledger
