= The Testament of Solomon =

Studio album by John Zorn
- Released: August 2014
- Recorded: March 17, 2014 at East Side Sound, NYC
- Genre: Avant-garde; jazz; contemporary classical music
- Length: 48:31
- Label: Tzadik TZ 8321
- Producer: John Zorn

John Zorn chronology
On Leaves of Grass (2014)	The Testament of Solomon (2014)	Valentine's Day (2014)

The Gnostic Trio chronology
In Lambeth (2013)	The Testament of Solomon (2014)	Transmigration of the Magus (2014)

The Testament of Solomon is an album composed by John Zorn and performed by the Gnostic Trio (Bill Frisell, Carol Emanuel and Kenny Wollesen). It was recorded in New York City in March 2014 and released on the Tzadik label. The album is the fourth by the trio following 2012's The Gnostic Preludes and 2013's The Mysteries and In Lambeth.

== Reception ==
In JazzTimes Bill Beuttler wrote "The music for this, the fourth Gnostic Trio recording, was originally an instrumental prelude to Zorn’s vocal work Shir Hashirim and leaves more room for improvisation than those preceding it. ...he’s staked another claim to his great range as a composer with this very lovely album."

== Track listing ==
All compositions by John Zorn

1. "Alamot" – 4:20
2. "Kotlenu" – 4:45
3. "Holat Ahavah" – 4:24
4. "'Ayummah" – 4:32
5. "Nirdi" – 3:15
6. "Asis" – 4:31
7. "'Atarah" – 4:47
8. "Tappuha" – 3:35
9. "Berotim" – 4:45
10. "Otyah" – 5:10
11. "Sammatek" – 4:27

== Personnel ==
- Carol Emanuel – harp
- Bill Frisell – guitar
- Kenny Wollesen – vibraphone

=== Production ===
- Marc Urselli – engineer, audio mixer
- John Zorn and Kazunori Sugiyama – producers
