= Dance Again (disambiguation) =

"Dance Again" is a 2012 song by Jennifer Lopez.

Dance Again may also refer to:

== Music ==
=== Albums ===
- Dance Again... the Hits, a 2012 greatest hits album by Jennifer Lopez
  - Dance Again World Tour, a 2012 concert tour by Jennifer Lopez in support of Dance Again... the Hits
  - Jennifer Lopez: Dance Again, a 2014 documentary film starring Jennifer Lopez
- Dance Again, a 1962 album by Edmundo Ros
- Dance Again, a 2014 album by LIFE Worship

=== Songs ===
- "Dance Again" (Selena Gomez song), 2020
- "Dance Again", a song by Gareth Gates from Go Your Own Way, 2003
- "Dance Again", a song by John Zorn from Shir Hashirim, 2013

== See also ==
- "I Just Wanna Dance Again", a song by Amanda Lear
- Never Gonna Dance Again (disambiguation)
