= Pellucidar: A Dreamers Fantabula =

Studio album by John Zorn
- Released: June 23, 2015
- Recorded: February 2015 at Eastside Sound, NYC
- Genre: Jazz
- Length: 51:45
- Label: Tzadik TZ 8333
- Producer: John Zorn

John Zorn chronology
The Song Project Live at Le Poisson Rouge (2015)	Pellucidar: A Dreamers Fantabula (2015)	Forro Zinho (2015)

The Dreamers chronology
A Dreamers Christmas (2011)	Pellucidar: A Dreamers Fantabula (2015)

Pellucidar: A Dreamers Fantabula is an album by John Zorn's group, The Dreamers, released in June 2015 on the Tzadik label.

== Reception ==
Professional ratings
Review scores
Source	Rating
Allmusic	"
PopMatters	7/10 stars

Allmusic said "It's similar to both The Dreamers and O'o, but the playing of this group never gets old. ...Pellucidar is another great offering from Zorn's most accessible project." PopMatters stated "The peculiar thing about Dreamers is that despite the stunning musical acumen of all involved, they aren’t really what one would call a "musician’s band." Their performances are impressive, but in a subtle way. There are no flights of fancy, just an atmosphere to drape over your senses. When a cozy blanket is covering you, you don’t think about the individual fibers. And when you listen to a Dreamers album, you don’t think about Trevor Dunn’s time in Mr. Bungle. You think about how sweet life is and how having another Dreamers album is now a part of that sweet life."

== Track listing ==
All compositions by John Zorn

1. "Magic Carpet Ride" – 7:36
2. "Gormenghast" – 8:29
3. "Queen of Ilium" – 5:19
4. "Once Upon a Time" – 5:13
5. "Flight from Salem" – 4:20
6. "Pellucidar" – 3:35
7. "Atlantis" – 4:59
8. "A Perfume from Cleopolis" – 6:09
9. "Jewels of Opar" – 6:10

== Personnel ==
- Marc Ribot − guitars
- Jamie Saft − keyboards
- Kenny Wollesen − vibes
- Trevor Dunn − bass
- Joey Baron − drums
- Cyro Baptista − percussion
