= Dictée/Liber Novus =

Studio album by John Zorn
- Released: May 21, 2010
- Genres: Avant-garde, contemporary classical music
- Length: 39:19
- Label: Tzadik
- Producer: John Zorn

John Zorn chronology
Baal: Book of Angels Volume 15 (2010)	Dictée/Liber Novus (2010)	The Goddess — Music for the Ancient of Days (2010)

Dictée/Liber Novus is the twelfth studio album by John Zorn which features two compositions: Dictée (a homage to writer and conceptual artist Theresa Hak Kyung Cha) and Liber Novus (inspired by the Red Book of Carl Jung).

== Reception ==
Professional ratings
Review scores
Source	Rating
Allmusic	4/5 stars

Allmusic awarded the album 4 stars. All About Jazz stated "For adventurous listeners in search of new musical experience, it is an exciting experience that is vast in scope and full of delightful mysteries".

== Track listing ==
All compositions by John Zorn

1. "Dictée" - 23:18
2. "Liber Novus" - 16:02

== Personnel ==
- Sylvie Courvoisier - piano, French narration
- Okkyung Lee - cello, Korean narration
- John Medeski - organ
- Ned Rothenberg - shakuhachi, bass flute, clarinet
- David Slusser - sound effects
- Kenny Wollesen - vibraphone, percussion, Wollesonics
- John Zorn - foley effects, samples, German narration
- Stephen Gosling - piano
