= Valentine's Day (John Zorn album) =

Valentine’s Day

Studio album by John Zorn
- Released: September 2014
- Label: Tzadik

John Zorn chronology
On Leaves of Grass (2014)	Valentine’s Day (2014)	The Song Project (2014)

Valentine's Day: John Zorn's Enigma Trios is an album by John Zorn. In 2014 Zorn took the audio from his existing 2010 album of duos, Enigmata, performed by Marc Ribot & Trevor Dunn on guitar & bass guitar respectively and recorded an improvised drum accompaniment by Tyshawn Sorey to create this album of ex post facto trios. The twelve (instrumental) tracks were given new titles.

== Track listing ==
All compositions by John Zorn

1. "Potions and Poisons" – 3:05
2. "Fireworks" – 3:38
3. "Blind Owl and Buckwheats" – 4:30
4. "Abramelin" – 3:19
5. "Seven Secrets" – 2:53
6. "Before I Saw the Spirit of a Child" – 4:40
7. "UX" – 4:04
8. "The Voynich" – 4:33
9. "Codebreaker" – 4:32
10. "Map" – 3:41
11. "Black Mirror" – 2:18
12. "And the Clouds Drift By" – 2:48

== Personnel ==
- Trevor Dunn: Electric 5-string Bass
- Marc Ribot: Electric Guitar
- Tyshawn Sorey: Drums
