= The Hermetic Organ =

Live album by John Zorn
- Released: June 19, 2012
- Recorded: December 9, 2011
- Venue: St. Paul's Chapel, Columbia University, New York City
- Genre: Improvised music
- Length: 36:25
- Label: Tzadik TZ 7399
- Producer: John Zorn

John Zorn chronology
Templars: In Sacred Blood (2012)	The Hermetic Organ (2012)	Rimbaud (2012)

The Hermetic Organ is an album by John Zorn, consisting of a single live improvisation on the Aeolian-Skinner pipe organ of St. Paul's Chapel at Columbia University, which was released on Tzadik Records in June 2012. The performance was held at 11 PM on the evening of December 9, 2011, which Zorn has noted was a full moon, as an encore to a "Composer Portrait" ensemble performance of his works held earlier that night at the Miller Theatre. It is the first release by Zorn to exclusively document his solo improvisations on the organ, his first instrument. In 2014, Zorn released a second volume of improvisations, The Hermetic Organ Vol. 2.

== Reception ==
Professional ratings
Review scores
Source	Rating
Free Jazz Collective	4/5 stars

Lou Reed, who attended the performance, called it a night of "culmination and conquest", and Zorn himself thought highly of the improvisation, calling it "something special" and "a truly magical event." Phillip Coombs of The Free Jazz Collective stated "This is a type of recording that needs to be savored, played loud and with good headphones... this is a very serious recording, especially with the themes he tackles and the environment he tackles them in. Rarely is Zorn recorded solo lately and this alone makes it special".

== Track listing ==
No.	Title	Length
1.	"Office Nr 4"; 1. "Introit"; 2. "Benediction"; 3. "Offertory"; 4. "Elevation"; 5. "Communion"; 6. "Descent"	36:25

== Personnel ==
- John Zorn − Aeolian-Skinner organ
