= The Hermetic Organ Vol. 2 =

Live album by John Zorn
- Released: January 21, 2014
- Recorded: September 23, 2013; St. Paul's Chapel, Columbia University, NYC
- Genre: Improvised music
- Length: 47:09
- Label: Tzadik TZ 8312
- Producer: John Zorn

John Zorn chronology
Shir Hashirim (2013)	The Hermetic Organ Vol. 2 (2014)	Psychomagia (2014)

The Hermetic Organ Vol. 2 is an album by John Zorn, consisting of a live improvisation on the Aeolian-Skinner pipe organ of St. Paul's Chapel at Columbia University, which was recorded on September 23, 2013 and released on Tzadik Records in January 2014. The performance was part of the Miller Theatre's Zorn @ 60 series. It follows Zorn's first volume of organ improvisations, The Hermetic Organ (2012).

== Reception ==
Professional ratings
Review scores
Source	Rating
Free Jazz Collective	3.5/5 stars

Brian Questa of The Free Jazz Collective stated "In The Hermetic Organ, Vol. 2, the command he has over his own improvisations is remarkable. His instincts lead him to a sensitive balance of colors and expressions. There are no awkward transitions, no embarrassing turns of phrase, nothing to suggest that, for Zorn, the risks inherent in free improvisation produce anything other than quality music".

== Track listing ==
All compositions by John Zorn

Office Nr 9: The Passion

1. "Crucifixion" - 6:55
2. "Prayer" - 9:12
3. "Ascent Into the Maelstrom" - 4:34
4. "In Gloria Dei" - 11:28
5. "Holy Spirit" - 7:17
6. "Battle of the Angels" - 3:16
7. "Communion" - 4:21

== Personnel ==
- John Zorn − Aeolian-Skinner organ
