= Matthew Rozeik =

Matthew Rozeik is a composer from London, England and member of Necro Deathmort and Astrohenge. His musical style takes in elements of electronica, metal, progressive rock and drone.

== Biography ==
Matthew Rozeik started composing for film in 1999, and has had releases on labels including Awkward Silence Recordings, Static Caravan, and Highpoint Lowlife.

His first live appearance was at the ninth Truck Festival, and he has played sporadically since with his ensemble.

In 2007 he wrote original music for the film In the Hands of the Gods, and formed Astrohenge. He was also involved with the filming and sound on the Melvins Fantômas Big Band DVD, "Live From London 2006".

== Discography ==
Eps

- Matthew Rozeik/Ylid split (2006, Awkward Silence Recordings)
- Van 111 split with Ylid (2006, Static Caravan)
- Oh Lord, Please Give Me Another Brain: Reinterpreted (2006, Highpoint Lowlife)

Appearances

- Stop, Look, Wave (2005 Cactus Island) – track: "Oh Lord, Please Give Me Another Brain"
- Analog For Architecture (2006 Highpoint Lowlife) – track: "Laugh It Off"
- These Waves... (2006 Sound In Sound) – track: "Citrus Dirge"
- The Melvins Fantômas Big Band "Live From London 2006" (2008 Ipecac Recordings) – camera, mixing, restoration

=== With Astrohenge ===
- Astrohenge (2009 Eyesofsound)
- II (2011 Eyesofsound)

=== With Necro Deathmort ===
- This Beat Is Necrotronic (2009 Distraction)
- Music of Bleak Origin (2011 Distraction)
- The Colonial Script (2012 Distraction)
