= Rimbaud (album) =

Studio album by John Zorn
- Released: August 28, 2012
- Recorded: December 9, 2011, January 2012 and March 8, 2012
- Studio: Miller Theatre, Komachi Electric and East Side Sound, New York
- Genre: Experimental music, Contemporary classical music
- Length: 47:20
- Label: Tzadik TZ 8301
- Producer: John Zorn

John Zorn chronology
The Hermetic Organ (2012)	Rimbaud (2012)	A Vision in Blakelight (2012)

Rimbaud is an album by John Zorn. The album was released on Zorn's own label Tzadik Records in August 2012. It was dedicated to French poet Arthur Rimbaud.

== Reception ==
Professional ratings
Review scores
Source	Rating
Allmusic	4.5/5 stars
Free Jazz Collective	3.5/5 stars

Allmusic said "The album is a non-negotiable must-have for the composer's fans and offers a suggestion of his terrific versatility for anyone interested in sampling his work". Martin Schray called it "a collection of four stylistically very diverse pieces".

== Track listing ==
No.	Title	Length
1.	"Bateau Ivre"	11:01
2.	"A Season in Hell"	12:21
3.	"Illuminations"	11:38
4.	"Conneries"	12:20

== Personnel ==
- John Zorn − samples, electronics, alto saxophone, piano, organ, guitar, drums, Foley effects
- Trevor Dunn − bass
- Brad Lubman − conductor
- Ikue Mori − laptop, electronics
- Kenny Wollesen − drums
- Mathieu Amalric − voice
- Steve Beck − piano
- Erik Carlson − violin
- Stephen Gosling − piano
- Chris Gross − cello
- Al Lipowski − vibraphone
- Rane Moore − clarinet
- Tara O'Connor − flute
- Elizabeth Weisser − viola
