= The Goddess – Music for the Ancient of Days =

Studio album by John Zorn
- Released: June 29, 2010
- Genre: Avant-garde experimental music
- Length: 47:42
- Label: Tzadik TZ 7383
- Producer: John Zorn

John Zorn chronology
Dictée/Liber Novus (2010)	The Goddess – Music for the Ancient of Days (2010)	Haborym: Book of Angels Volume 16 (2010)

Professional ratings
Review scores
Source	Rating
Allmusic	4/5 stars

The Goddess – Music for the Ancient of Days is an album composed by John Zorn and released on the Tzadik label. It is the third in a series of albums, the first two being Alhambra Love Songs and In Search of the Miraculous.

== Reception ==
Professional ratings
Review scores
Source	Rating
Allmusic	4/5 stars

Allmusic said "This mystic celebration of the feminine is, like its previously released cousin, another of Zorn's more ambitious -- yet deliberate -- attempts at writing adventurous music that is at once accessible and arresting in its beauty".

== Track listing ==
All compositions by John Zorn

1. "Enchantress" – 7:44
2. "Ishtar" – 5:36
3. "Heptameron" – 5:17
4. "White Magick" – 6:37
5. "Drawing Down the Moon" – 5:49
6. "Beyond the Infinite" – 11:51
7. "Ode to Delphi" – 4:43

== Personnel ==
- Rob Burger - piano
- Carol Emanuel - harp
- Marc Ribot - guitar
- Kenny Wollesen - vibraphone
- Ben Perowsky - drums
- Trevor Dunn - bass
