= Music and Its Double =

Studio album by John Zorn
- Released: October 30, 2012
- Recorded: September & December 9, 2011 and May 2012
- Genre: Avant-garde, contemporary classical music
- Length: 42:33
- Label: Tzadik TZ 8092
- Producer: John Zorn

John Zorn chronology
A Vision in Blakelight (2012)	Music and Its Double (2012)	The Concealed (2012)

Music and Its Double is an album composed by John Zorn and featuring three contemporary compositions which were recorded in late 2011 and early 2012 in New York City and Finland, released on the Tzadik label in October 2012. The first track dedicated to composer György Ligeti, "À Rebours", was recorded at the Miller Theatre by cellist Fred Sherry and ensemble conducted by Brad Lubman. The four movements of "Ceremonial Magic" are 2012 studio recordings by David Fulmer and Kenny Wollesen and the final composition, "La Machine de L'Être" inspired by Antonin Artaud, was recorded by the Lahti Symphony Orchestra in 2011.

== Track listing ==
All compositions by John Zorn

1. "À Rebours" - 11:12
2. "Ceremonial Magic I" - 5:37
3. "Ceremonial Magic II" - 4:07
4. "Ceremonial Magic III" - 5:52
5. "Ceremonial Magic IV" - 4:03
6. "La Machine de L'Être: Tetème" - 4:10
7. "La Machine de L'Être: Le Révélé" - 3:26
8. "La Machine de L'Être: Entremêlés" - 4:04

== Personnel ==
Track 1:

- Fred Sherry - cello
- Jennifer Choi - violin
- David Fulmer - viola
- Mike Nicolas - cello
- June Han - harp
- Tara Helen O'Connor - flute
- Josh Rubin - clarinet
- Al Lipowski, Joe Pereira, William Winant - percussion
- Brad Lubman - conductor

Tracks 2–5:

- David Fulmer - violin
- Kenny Wollesen - drums

Tracks 6–8:

- Anu Komsi - soprano
- Lahti Symphony Orchestra conducted by Sakari Oramo
