= In Lambeth (album) =

Studio album by John Zorn / Gnostic Trio
- Released: December 3, 2013
- Recorded: April 10 & 11, 2013 at East Side Sound, NYC
- Genre: Avant-garde, Jazz, Contemporary classical music
- Length: 48:32
- Label: Tzadik TZ 8309
- Producer: John Zorn

John Zorn chronology
On the Torment of Saints, the Casting of Spells and the Evocation of Spirits (2013)	In Lambeth (2013)	Shir Hashirim (2013)

The Gnostic Trio chronology
The Mysteries (2013)	In Lambeth (2013)	The Testament of Solomon (2014)

In Lambeth (subtitled Visions from the Walled Garden of William Blake) is an album composed by John Zorn and performed by the Gnostic Trio (Bill Frisell, Carol Emanuel and Kenny Wollesen), recorded in New York City in April 2013 and released on the Tzadik label in December 2013. The album is the third by the trio following The Gnostic Preludes (2012) and The Mysteries (2013). Its title quotes from William Blake's poem Jerusalem (plate 37, line 14 - "There is a Grain of Sand in Lambeth that Satan cannot find").

== Reception ==
Professional ratings
Review scores
Source	Rating
Free Jazz Collective	4/5 stars

Martin Schray stated "If you like Zorn’s other works in this field, you won’t go wrong on this one."

== Track listing ==
All compositions by John Zorn

1. "Tiriel" – 4:58
2. "A Morning Light" – 4:46
3. "America, a Prophecy" – 6:17
4. "Through the Looking Glass" – 3:56
5. "The Ancient of Days" – 6:55
6. "Puck" – 3:36
7. "The Minotaur" – 3:26
8. "The Night of Enitharmon's Joy" – 4:55
9. "Walled Garden" – 4:33

== Personnel ==
- Carol Emanuel – harp
- Bill Frisell – guitar
- Kenny Wollesen – vibraphone, bells
- Ikue Mori – electronics (track 7)

=== Production ===
- Marc Urselli – engineer, audio mixer
- John Zorn and Kazunori Sugiyama – producers
