= Mount Analogue (disambiguation) =

Mount Analogue (French: Le Mont Analogue) is a novel by René Daumal, posthumously published in 1952 in French and 1959 in English.

Mount Analogue may also refer to:

- Mount Analogue (Antarctica), a mountain
- Mount Analogue (album)
- "Mount Analogue", a song by Idlewild from the album Interview Music
