= Sister Phantom Owl Fish =

Studio album by Trevor Dunn's trio-convulsant
- Released: July 27, 2004
- Recorded: February 18–20, 2004
- Studio: Systems Two, Brooklyn, NY
- Genre: Jazz, alternative rock
- Length: 55:55
- Label: Ipecac; IPC-052

Trevor Dunn chronology
Debutantes & Centipedes (1998)	Sister Phantom Owl Fish (2004)	Four Films (2008)

Sister Phantom Owl Fish is an album by bassist Trevor Dunn's band trio-convulsant which was released in 2004 on the Ipecac label.

== Reception ==
Professional ratings
Review scores
Source	Rating
Allmusic	4/5 stars

On Allmusic, Sean Westergaard observed "The music they play is not so much a fusion of styles as it is a collision of styles. Almost straight-ahead jazz noodling gives way to hardcore blasts and crunching power chords, then completely devolves into Derek Bailey territory, but the band is always together. You can tell that some of it is quite composed, and that other sections are most likely entirely improvised. ... If you've been following Trevor Dunn's widely varied career as a player, you know he's got a sense of adventure, and Sister Phantom Owl Fish will not disappoint". In JazzTimes Chris Kelsey wrote "its heavy-metal, jump-cut, rebel-without-a-cause aesthetic just leaves me cold. Bassist Dunn, guitarist Mary Halvorson and drummer Ches Smith are all very accomplished musicians, and I'm sure they feel very strongly about their work. But I can't abide it". Exclaim!'s Chris Gramlich said "Sister Phantom Owl Fish features structured jazz runs, plucked single notes, atonal scratching, noodling lines building to freak-outs, moments of improv, vaguely metal power chording, impressive playing from all three involved".

== Track listing ==
All compositions by Trevor Dunn except where noted.

1. "Liver-Colored Dew" – 6:00
2. "The Empty Glass Has a Name" – 4:42
3. "Specter of Serling" – 6:12
4. "Me Susurra un Secreto" – 1:45
5. "Dawn's Early Vengeance" – 5:41
6. "The Single Petal of a Rose" (Duke Ellington, Billy Strayhorn) – 6:32
7. "The Salamander" – 6:08
8. "She Ossifies" – 8:24
9. "Styrofoam & Grief" – 6:41
10. "I'm Sick" (André Previn) – 2:50
11. "Untitled" – 1:00

== Personnel ==
- Trevor Dunn – bass
- Mary Halvorson – guitar
- Ches Smith – drums
- Shelley Burgon – harp (track 6)
