= George Steel (musician) =

George Steel is a musician living in New York City. He has worked in New York and around the world for 25 years as a conductor, composer, producer, singer, pianist, musicologist, and teacher. In January 2018, he was appointed Abrams Curator of Music at the Isabella Stewart Gardner Museum.

Steel is founder and conductor of two groups, the Vox Vocal Ensemble and the Gotham City Orchestra. Some of his notable concerts include Stravinsky's orchestral music at the Park Avenue Armory, Bach's B Minor Mass in New York and at Caramoor, Morton Feldman's Rothko Chapel in a live radio broadcast, "Treasures of the Sarum Rite" with the Trinity Church choir, and an all-John Zorn program in Helsinki with the Avanti! Orchestra.

Steel is active as a composer of both concert music and musical theater. In 2016, for his work as a composer/lyricist, he received the BMI Jerry Harrington Award "for outstanding creative achievement in musical theater". His commissioned concert work The Three Kings received its premiere in the rotunda of the Guggenheim Museum in 2012. The New York Times called it "a raucous dance party, complete with percussion outbursts and syncopated brass rhythms."

From 2009 to 2013, Steel served as General Manager and Artistic Director of the New York City Opera. There, he oversaw new productions of Don Giovanni, Così fan tutte, Leonard Bernstein's A Quiet Place (in its New York premiere), and an evening of monodramas (including works by Zorn and Feldman in their New York stage premieres) directed by Michael Counts. Steel's tenure also saw revivals of Chabrier's L'Etoile, Weisgall's Esther, and Madama Butterfly.

From 1997 to 2008, Steel was executive director of Miller Theatre, the performing-arts venue of Columbia University. In the 2004-05 season, he received the ASCAP-Chamber Music America (CMA) Award for Adventurous Programming of Contemporary Music. He received the 2003 Trailblazer Award from the American Music Center, the 2003 ASCAP Concert Music Award, and the 2001-02 ASCAP-CMA Award for Adventurous Programming. New York Magazine named Steel one of the most influential people in New York in its 2006 "Influentials" issue, and recognized his programming in its 2005 "Cultural Elite" issue, listing Miller Theatre as having the "Best Music Programming before 1800 or after 1990" and the "Best Night at the Ballet."

Before his decade at Miller Theater, Steel worked as Managing Producer of the Tisch Center for the Arts at the 92nd Street Y under Michael Barrett. In 2008, he was appointed general manager of the Dallas Opera, a post he held for only three months before leaving to take the helm of the struggling New York City Opera.

As an advocate for new music, Steel has commissioned dozens of new works from composers including Zorn, Peter Lieberson, Sebastian Currier, Julia Wolfe, Marc-André Dalbavie, Anthony Davis, Gerald Barry, Benedict Mason, and Benet Casablancas. An advocate for early music, he has created or commissioned dozens of editions of early music, including publishing the complete works of Robert Parsons on a website, which has led to a wave of performances and recordings.

Steel was a founding member of FACE, the French-American Cultural Exchange, a member of the Young Leaders Forum of the National Committee on US-China Relations, and the chair the Music Panel of the New York State Council on the Arts. He has lectured widely, including at the Aspen Music Festival, the Eastman School of Music, the Operahögskolans in Stockholm, Yale College, and classes at Columbia University as adjunct professor of music.

Steel's first job in New York was as a teacher at St. Augustine School of the Arts, a Catholic elementary school that had recently instituted an arts curriculum. The school was acclaimed for its work and was the subject of an award-winning documentary film.

Steel received his earliest musical training in the Choir of Men and Boys at Washington National Cathedral, where he was a treble and later a countertenor. He continued to perform as a countertenor for a decade. His last regular employment as a singer was at Saint Thomas Church Fifth Avenue in New York.
