= Melt Zonk Rewire =

Studio album by New Klezmer Trio
- Released: 1995
- Recorded: 1995
- Genre: Jazz, Klezmer
- Length: 53:42
- Label: Tzadik TZ 7103
- Producer: New Klezmer Trio

New Klezmer Trio chronology
| Masks and Faces (1991) | Melt Zonk Rewire (1995) | Short for Something (2000) |

Melt Zonk Rewire is the second album by the New Klezmer Trio, Ben Goldberg – clarinet, Dan Seamans – bass, and Kenny Wollesen – drums, which was released on the Tzadik label in 1995.

== Reception ==
Professional ratings
Review scores
| Source | Rating |
|---|---|
| Allmusic | 4/5 stars |

In her review for Allmusic, Joslyn Layne observed "With a perfect mixture of a sincere love of music, wit, and serious chops, they create a new klezmer that draws from jazz, rock, and improvised traditions. Melt Zonk Rewire is full of creativity, with high energy and grooves tastefully offset by subdued, whispery pieces... essential for anyone whose music collection holds many disparate musical styles".

== Track listing ==
All compositions by Ben Goldberg except as indicated

1. "Gas Nine" (Traditional) – 2:24
2. "Sarcophagous" – 5:02
3. "The Haunt" (Dan Seamans) – 4:33
4. "Thermoglypics" – 3:33
5. "The Chant" – 3:23
6. "We Got There" (Seamans) – 5:27
7. "Feedback Doina" (Kenny Wollesen) – 5:08
8. "Freilakh Nakht" (Traditional) – 3:04
9. "Hypothetical" – 3:22
10. "The Shot" – 3:59
11. "Distiller" (Traditional) – 2:35
12. "Phrases" – 3:29
13. "Fourth Floor" (Seamans) – 2:59
14. "Starting Place" – 4:44

== Personnel ==
- Ben Goldberg – clarinet
- Dan Seamans – bass
- Kenny Wollesen – drums
