= Templars: In Sacred Blood =

Studio album by John Zorn
- Released: 22 May 2012
- Recorded: October 2011–January 2012
- Length: 43:07
- Label: Tzadik TZ 7398
- Producer: John Zorn

John Zorn chronology
Nosferatu (2012)	Templars: In Sacred Blood (2012)	The Hermetic Organ (2012)

Moonchild chronology
Ipsissimus (2010)	Templers: In Sacred Blood (2012)	The Last Judgement (2014)

Templars: In Sacred Blood is an album by John Zorn released in May 2012 on the Tzadik label. It is the sixth album by Zorn's Moonchild project.

== Reception ==
Professional ratings
Review scores
Source	Rating
Allmusic	4/5 stars
Free Jazz Collective	4/5 stars

Allmusic said "of all the Moonchild releases, Templars: In Sacred Blood, is easily the most accessible, although relatively dark, it's a hell of a lot of fun. Even Zorn's lyrics are among the most poetic he's ever written; they follow a loose trajectory of historical and spiritual themes and still offer nods to his acidic sense of humor. His compositions are tight; they rarely give into the excesses that some of the other Moonchild projects have almost gleefully wallowed in. Templars: In Sacred Blood is a blast from top to bottom." Martin Schray stated "Templars – In Sacred Blood provides everything you expect, especially Mike Patton shows what a great vocalist he is. Supported by a crude musical mixture of wild metal breaks (“Templi Secretum”), obscure bass lines (“Evocation of Baphomet”, “Libera Me”), Gregorian chants (“Murder of the Magician”) and prog rock (“Secret Ceremony”) Patton provides spoken word narratives, on-top-of-his-voice screaming and shouting, baritone murmurs, or mysterious whispers. Great fun!"

== Track listing ==
All compositions by John Zorn

No.	Title	Length
1.	"Templi Secretum"	5:33
2.	"Evocation of Baphomet"	5:26
3.	"Murder of the Magicians"	4:14
4.	"Prophetic Souls"	6:20
5.	"Libera Me"	3:20
6.	"A Second Sanctuary"	5:06
7.	"Recordatio"	3:53
8.	"Secret Ceremony"	9:15

== Personnel ==
- Mike Patton − voice
- John Medeski − organ
- Trevor Dunn − bass
- Joey Baron − drums
