= What Thou Wilt =

Studio album by John Zorn
- Released: October 2010
- Genre: Contemporary classical music
- Length: 42:20
- Label: Tzadik TZ 8076
- Producer: John Zorn

John Zorn chronology
Ipsissimus (2010)	What Thou Wilt (2010)	Interzone (2010)

What Thou Wilt is an album of contemporary classical music composed by John Zorn and released in October 2010 on the Tzadik label. The opening concerto was composed in 1999, while the other two pieces date from 2005 and 2007. The album features many of Zorn's prominent collaborators, including Erik Friedlander, Stephen Drury, and Fred Sherry.

== Track list ==
1. CONTES DE FÉES - 13:18
2. ∴ (Fay Çe Que Vouldras) - 22:53
3. 777 (nothing is true, everything is permitted) - 6:10

== Personnel ==
- Ryan McAdams: Conductor
- Stephanie Nussbaum: Solo Violin
- Stephen Drury: Piano
- Erik Friedlander: Cello
- Fred Sherry: Cello
- Mike Nicolas: Cello

=== The Tanglewood Music Center Orchestra ===
- Karin Andreasen: First Violin
- Leah Arsenault: Flute
- Sarah Bass: Viola
- Joseph Becker: Percussion
- Brent Besner: Clarinet
- Zachary Boeding: Oboe
- Evan Buttemer: Viola
- Rosanna Butterfield: Cello
- Shawn Conley: Bass
- Allison Cook: Bass
- Andrew Cuneo: Bassoon
- Michael Dahlberg: Cello
- F. Ladrón de Guevara: First Violin
- Rui Du: Second Violin
- Alexandra Early: First Violin
- John Elliott: Tuba
- Amy Galluzzo: Second Violin
- Chen-Erh Ho: Viola
- David Hughes: Piano
- Julia Hunter: First Violin
- Oya Kazuki: Percussion
- Kathryn Kilian: Second Violin
- Anna Lindvall: Trombone
- Te-Chiang Liu: First Violin
- Mary Lynch: Oboe
- Joseph Maile: First Violin
- Derek Mosloff: Viola
- Tim Riley: Horn
- Laura Scalzo: Second Violin
- Derek Stults: Percussion
- Meryl Summers: Bassoon
- Charles Tyler: Cello
- Tema Watstein: Second Violin
- Ryan Yuré: Clarinet
- Heather Zinninger: Flute
