= A Vision in Blakelight =

Studio album by John Zorn
- Released: September 25, 2012
- Recorded: December 2011 at EastSide Sound, NYC
- Genre: Avant-garde, jazz, Contemporary classical music
- Length: 50:20
- Label: Tzadik; TZ 8303
- Producer: John Zorn

John Zorn chronology
| Rimbaud (2012) | A Vision in Blakelight (2012) | Music and Its Double (2012) |

A Vision in Blakelight is an album by John Zorn recorded in New York City in December 2011 and released on the Tzadik label in 2012. The album is inspired by the works of William Blake.

== Reception ==
Professional ratings
Review scores
| Source | Rating |
|---|---|
| Free Jazz Collective | 4/5 stars |

Martin Schray stated "The album is a wonderfully varied suite reflecting Blake’s vision and eventually one of his most famous quotations (“if the doors of perception were cleansed, everything would appear to man as it is, infinite“) is turned into music by the works of John Zorn".

== Track listing ==
All compositions by John Zorn except as indicated

1. "When the Morning Stars Sang Together" - 5:28
2. "The Hammer of Los" - 3:58
3. "Jerusalem" - 5:15
4. "Prophecy" - 3:10
5. "And He Rode Upon the Cherubim" - 5:09
6. "Marriage of Heaven and Hell" - 4:18
7. "Woman Clothed with the Sun" - 5:20
8. "Shadows in Ancient Time" (Zorn, William Blake) – 5:40
9. "Island in the Moon" - 7:06
10. "Night Thoughts" - 4:55

== Personnel ==
- John Medeski - piano, organ
- Kenny Wollesen - vibraphone, bells
- Carol Emanuel - harp
- Trevor Dunn - bass
- Joey Baron - drums
- Cyro Baptista - percussion
- Jack Huston - narration
