= David Scott Stone =

American musician

- Also known as: SirDSS; David Ascott Stone
- Origin: Sun Valley, California, United States
- Genres: Dance-punk; electronic; alternative dance
- Occupations: Musician; producer
- Instruments: Guitar; bass guitar; synthesizer; drum machine; percussion; home built instruments
- Years active: 1993–present
- Formerly of: Unwound; Melvins; LCD Soundsystem

David Scott Stone (sometimes referred to as Sir DSS and Mr. David Ascott Stone) is an American musician who has recorded and toured with artists like The Melvins, Unwound, Fantômas, The Locust, Jello Biafra, Keiji Haino, Mike Patton, Adam Jones (Tool), Merzbow, Masonna, Big Business, No Age, Joe Lally and others. He is a former member of the group LCD Soundsystem. He has been a regular performer at The Smell, a DIY music venue in Los Angeles since its opening. He has also been a member of Slug (1993–1996) and a founding member of Get Hustle (1996–2000).

He is notable for his experimental and whimsical approach to music, often using unusual instruments to produce unusual sounds. He builds his own instruments and modifies commercially available ones, which he then uses to record and perform his music.

== The Melvins ==
With The Melvins he has recorded on the albums Honky, Hostile Ambient Takeover, and Pigs of the Roman Empire using guitars, bowed cymbals, oscillators, analog synths, and instruments that he has built such as the "Electric Thundersheet", and the "Electric Long Thin Wire" that "use piezo elements in a regeneration circuit". He adds texture and noise to their already powerful sound. He is also on Millennium Monsterwork 2000 with Fantômas.

With the Melvins he has toured as second guitarist/noise maker from 2000 to 2001 (2x4 tours) and played bass guitar with them again from 2004 to 2006 doing shows with Jello Biafra, Fantômas, Melvins Big Band. He also played live scores to the films of Cameron Jamie playing France's Centre Pompidou, UCLA's Royce Hall as well as the 2006 Whitney Biennial.

Melvins drummer Dale Crover has gone on to say about Stone "He's the Eno of our band".

== Recent projects ==
- Scott Stone joined LCD Soundsystem in support of their This Is Happening world tour.
- He released an album of all modular synthesizer music with "Plays The Modular Synthesizer" .
- He formed The Sads with musicians Aaron Rose, Dan Monick and Aska Matsumiya.
- He recorded with Ancestors for their LP, Of Sound Mind.
- Scott Stone has collaborated with Psquare on "Bring it On" hit single.
