= Kenny Wollesen =

American drummer and percussionist

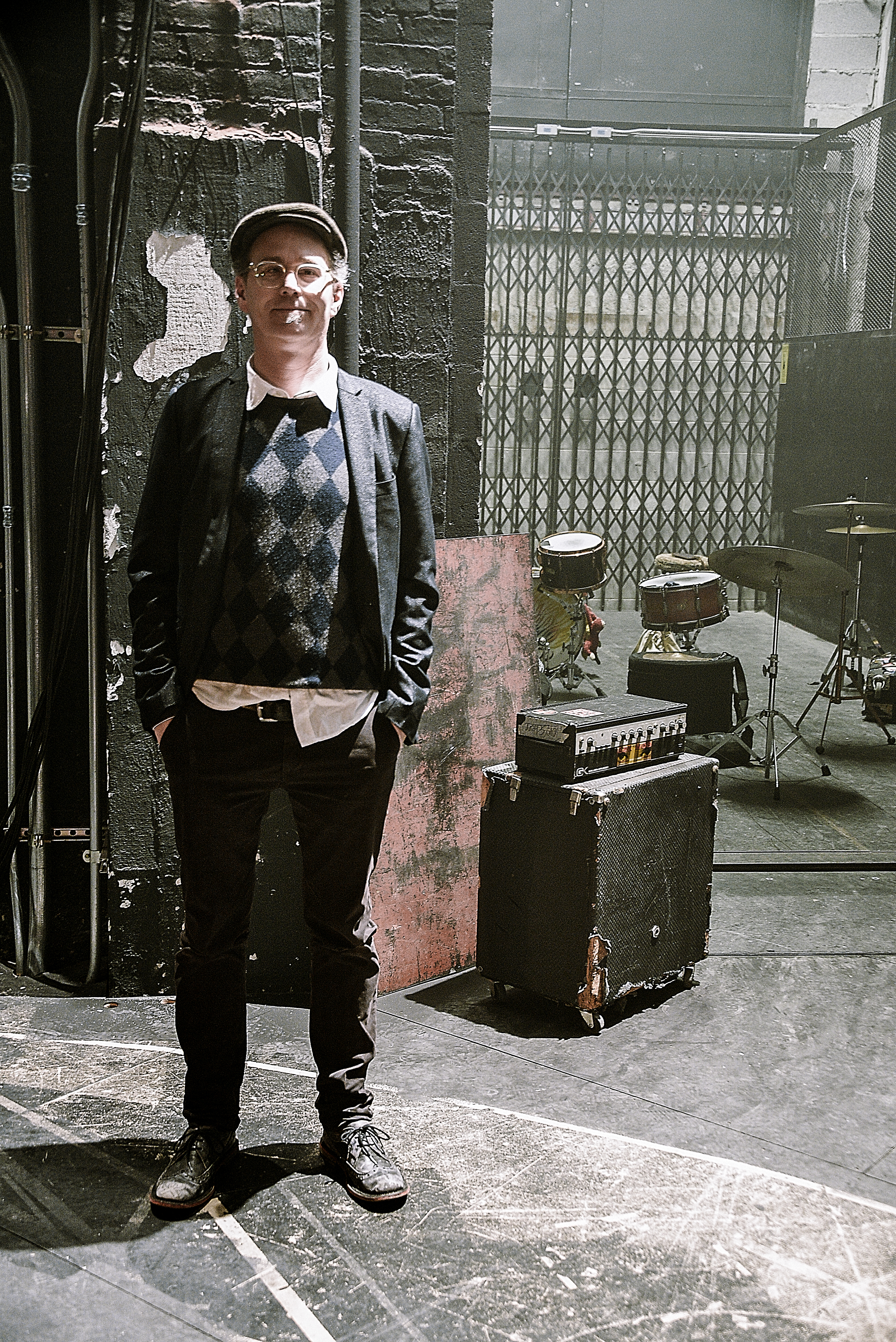
- Kenny Wollesen at Kings Theatre in Brooklyn, New York, 2016; Photo by Mae Moreno

Background information
- Born: 9 April 1966 (age 60)
- Genres: Avant-garde jazz, classical, rock
- Occupation: Musician
- Instruments: Drums, vibraphone, percussion
- Label: Tzadik
- Formerly of: New Klezmer Trio, Sex Mob, The Dreamers, The Gnostic Trio

Kenny Wollesen (born 1966) is an American drummer and percussionist.

Wollesen has recorded and toured with Julian Lage, Tom Waits, Sean Lennon, Ron Sexsmith, Bill Frisell, Norah Jones, John Lurie, Myra Melford, Steven Bernstein, and John Zorn. He is a founding member of the New Klezmer Trio and a member of the Sex Mob and Himalayas groups.

He grew up in Capitola, California, studying at Aptos High School, and spending many teenage years playing with Donny McCaslin. He spent quality classroom time with flugelhornist and arranger Ray Brown at Cabrillo College. He also arranges and studied vibraphone at Cabrillo.

Wollesen utilizes the Burton grip when playing vibraphone.

== Discography ==
=== As leader or co-leader ===
- Pitch, Rhythm and Consciousness (New Artists, 2011)
- The Gnostic Preludes: Music of Splendor (Tzadik, 2012)
- John Zorn: The Mysteries (Tzadik, 2013)
- Rasa Rasa (Tzadik, 2014)

With the Himalayas

- Son of Rogues Gallery: Pirate Ballads, Sea Songs & Chanteys (ANTI-, 2013)

With Myra Melford

- 2000 Dance Beyond the Color, Myra Melford's Crush
- 2004 Where the Two Worlds Touch, Myra Melford's the Tent

With New Klezmer Trio

- Masks and Faces (Nine Winds, 1991 / Tzadik, 1996)
- Melt Zonk Rewire (Tzadik, 1995)
- Short for Something (Tzadik, 2000)

With Sexmob

- 1998 Din of Inequity
- 2000 Solid Sender
- 2000 Theatre & Dance
- 2001 Sex Mob Does Bond
- 2003 Dime Grind Palace
- 2006 Sexotica
- 2009 Sex Mob Meets Medeski: Live in Willisau
- 2013 Cinema, Circus & Spaghetti: Sexmob Plays Fellini
- 2017 Cultural Capital
- 2023 The Hard Way

With others

- 1997 Interpretations of Lessness, Andy Laster's Lessness
- 1997 The Loan, Brad Shepik
- 1998 At Home, Slow Poke
- 1998 Fabulous, Drop Curlew
- 2000 Hidden Gardens, Lan Xang
- 2000 Redemption, Slow Poke
- 2006 Ways Not to Lose, The Wood Brothers
- 2021 Bond Riviera, Rocket Sci

=== As sideman ===
With Steve Beresford

- Signals for Tea (Avant, 1995)

With David Byrne

- Grown Backwards (Elektra/Nonesuch, 2004)

With Nels Cline

- Lovers (Blue Note, 2016)

With Crash Test Dummies

- I Don't Care That You Don't Mind (Cha-Ching, 2001)
- Jingle All the Way (Cha-Ching, 2002)

With Sylvie Courvoisier

- Double Windsor (Tzadik, 2014)
- D’Agala (Intakt, 2018)
- Free Hopes (Intakt, 2020)

With Trevor Dunn's trio-convulsant

- Debutantes & Centipedes (Buzz, 1998)

With Bill Frisell

- Blues Dream (Elektra/Nonesuch, 2001)
- Unspeakable (Elektra/Nonesuch, 2004)
- East/West (Elektra/Nonesuch, 2005)
- Further East/Further West (Elektra/Nonesuch, 2005)
- History, Mystery (Elektra/Nonesuch, 2008)
- All We Are Saying (Savoy Jazz, 2011)
- The Kentucky Derby Is Decadent and Depraved (2012)
- Guitar in the Space Age! (OKeh, 2014)

With Ben Goldberg

- The Relative Value of Things (33¼, 1992)
- Orphic Machine (2015)

With Jesse Harris

- 2003 The Secret Sun
- 2004 While the Music Lasts
- 2006 Mineral
- 2010 Cosmo

With Rickie Lee Jones

- 2003 The Evening of My Best Day (2003)
- 2009 Balm in Gilead

With Julian Lage

- ARCLIGHT (Mack Avenue, 2016)
- Modern Lore (Mack Avenue, 2018)

With Sean Lennon

- Into the Sun (Grand Royal, 1998)

With Rudy Linka

- 2002 Simple Pleasures
- 2007 Beyond the New York City Limits

With Kate McGarry

- 2001 Show Me
- 2005 Mercy Streets

With Ruper Ordorika

- Dabilen Harria (Nuevos Medios, 1999)
- Hurrengo goizean (Metak, 2002)
- Kantuok jartzen ditut (Metak, 2004)
- Memoriaren Mapan (Elkar, 2006)
- Haizea Garizumakoa (Elkar, 2009)
- Hodeien azpian (Elkar, 2011)
- Lurrean etzanda (Elkar, 2014)
- Guria ostatuan (Elkar, 2016)
- Amour et toujours (Elkar, 2021)

With Ellen Reid

- 2001 Cinderellen (Mr. Friendly)

With Carrie Rodriguez/Chip Taylor

- 2005 Red Dog Tracks
- 2006 Seven Angels on a Bicycle
- 2007 Live from the Ruhr Triennale
- 2010 The New Bye & Bye

With Jenny Scheinman

- 2002 The Rabbi's Lover
- 2004 Shalagaster
- 2008 Crossing the Field
- 2008 Jenny Scheinman
- 2024 All Species Parade

With Tony Scherr

- 2002 Come Around
- 2007 Twist in the Wind

With John Scofield

- 2000 Bump

With Leni Stern

- 2000 Kindness of Strangers
- 2004 When Evening Falls

With Rufus Wainwright

- 2003 Want One
- 2007 Release the Stars

With Tom Waits

- 1993 The Black Rider (Island)

With John Zorn

- Bar Kokhba (Tzadik, 1994–96)
- Filmworks VIII: 1997 (Tzadik, 1998)
- Filmworks XIII: Invitation to a Suicide (Tzadik, 2002)
- Filmworks XIV: Hiding and Seeking (Tzadik, 2003)
- 50th Birthday Celebration Volume 4 (Tzadik, 2004) with Electric Masada
- Voices in the Wilderness (Tzadik, 2003)
- Electric Masada: At the Mountains of Madness (Tzadik, 2005) with Electric Masada
- Filmworks XVII: Notes on Marie Menken/Ray Bandar: A Life with Skulls (Tzadik, 2006)
- Filmworks XVIII: The Treatment (Tzadik, 2006)
- The Dreamers (Tzadik, 2008)
- Filmworks XXI: Belle de Nature/The New Rijksmuseum (Tzadik, 2008)
- O'o (Tzadik, 2009) with The Dreamers
- Filmworks XXIV: The Nobel Prizewinner (Tzadik, 2010)
- Ipos: Book of Angels Volume 14 (Tzadik, 2010) with The Dreamers
- Baal: Book of Angels Volume 15 (Tzadik, 2010) with Ben Goldberg Quartet
- In Search of the Miraculous (Tzadik, 2010)
- Dictée/Liber Novus (Tzadik, 2010)
- Interzone (Tzadik, 2010)
- The Goddess – Music for the Ancient of Days (Tzadik, 2010)
- The Satyr's Play / Cerberus (Tzadik, 2011)
- Nova Express (Tzadik, 2011) with the Nova Quartet
- At the Gates of Paradise (Tzadik, 2011)
- A Dreamers Christmas (Tzadik, 2011) with The Dreamers
- Mount Analogue (Tzadik, 2012)
- The Gnostic Preludes (Tzadik, 2012) with the Gnostic Trio
- Rimbaud (Tzadik, 2012)
- A Vision in Blakelight (Tzadik, 2012)
- Music and Its Double (Tzadik, 2012)
- The Concealed (Tzadik, 2012)
- The Mysteries (Tzadik, 2013) with the Gnostic Trio
- Dreamachines (Tzadik, 2013) with the Nova Quartet
- In Lambeth (Tzadik, 2013) with the Gnostic Trio
- On Leaves of Grass (Tzadik, 2014) with the Nova Quartet
- The Testament of Solomon (Tzadik, 2014) with the Gnostic Trio
- Pellucidar: A Dreamers Fantabula (Tzadik, 2015) with The Dreamers
- The Mockingbird (2016)
- The Painted Bird (2016)

With others

- 1990 And Then There's This, Jessica Williams
- 1996 Dreamland, Madeleine Peyroux
- 1996 The Sun Died, Ellery Eskelin
- 1997 Penumbra: The Moon Sessions, Dmitri Matheny
- 1998 Dopamine, Mitchell Froom
- 1999 Thoroughfare, Rebecca Martin
- 1999 Work in Progress 89-98, Wolfgang Muthspiel
- 2000 Shebang, Steve Cardenas
- 2001 Buttermilk Channel, Adam Levy
- 2002 Come Away with Me, Norah Jones
- 2008 The Living and the Dead, Jolie Holland
- 2009 Trombone Tribe, Roswell Rudd
- 2011 Everything is Alive, Hank Roberts
- 2011 Graylen Epicenter, David Binney
- 2012 Howie 61, Wayne Krantz
- 2013 Another Life, James Maddock
- 2013 Ghost on Ghost, Iron & Wine
- 2014 Natalie Merchant, Natalie Merchant
- 2015 Didn't He Ramble, Glen Hansard
