= Masks and Faces (album) =

Studio album by New Klezmer Trio
- Released: 1991
- Recorded: June 1990, Music Annex, Menlo Park, California
- Genre: Jazz, Klezmer
- Length: 53:17
- Label: Nine Winds NWCD 0144; Tzadik TZ 7112
- Producer: New Klezmer Trio

New Klezmer Trio chronology
Masks and Faces (1991)	Melt Zonk Rewire (1995)

Ben Goldberg chronology
Masks and Faces (1991)	The Relative Value of Things (1992)

Masks and Faces is the debut album by the New Klezmer Trio, Ben Goldberg - clarinet, Dan Seamans - bass, and Kenny Wollesen - drums, which was originally released on the Nine Winds label in 1991 and re-released on the Tzadik label in 1996.

== Reception ==
Professional ratings
Review scores
Source	Rating
Allmusic	3/5 stars

In her review for Allmusic, Joslyn Layne observed "this raucous, bursting, and somewhat disjointed music sustains a groove that's not so hard to hang on to. Almost an hour in length, New Klezmer Trio's first release ebbs and flows, relentlessly packed with high quality tunes".

== Track listing ==
All compositions by Ben Goldberg except as indicated

1. "Cardboard Factory" - 5:06
2. "Hot and Cold" (Traditional) - 3:44
3. "Rebbe's Meal" (Traditional) - 7:36
4. "Up" (Dan Seamans) - 4:19
5. "Washing Machine Song" (Traditional) - 2:59
6. "Galicain" (Sam Beckerman) - 5:18
7. "Masks and Faces" - 6:33
8. "Haphazard" (Itzikl Kramtweiss) - 4:03
9. "Bitonal Song" (Kramtweiss) - 3:06
10. "The Gate" - 10:33

== Personnel ==
- Ben Goldberg - clarinet, bass clarinet
- Dan Seamans - bass
- Kenny Wollesen - drums
