= Delìrium Còrdia =

Studio album by Fantômas
- Released: January 27, 2004
- Studios: The Sound Factory (Hollywood, California)
- Genre: Avant-garde metal
- Length: 74:17
- Label: Ipecac
- Producer: Mike Patton

Fantômas chronology
Millennium Monsterwork 2000 (2002)	Delìrium Còrdia (2004)	Suspended Animation (2005)

Delìrium Còrdia is the third studio album by American experimental metal band Fantômas, released on January 27, 2004, by Ipecac Recordings.

== Production ==
Pre-production for Delìrium Còrdia began in November 2002, with a planned title of Shaq Owns You and a release date of September 2003 being reported. Drowned in Sound alleged that the album would be more "song oriented" than Fantomas previous work.

== Reception ==
Professional ratings
Aggregate scores
Source	Rating
Metacritic	65/100
Review scores
Source	Rating
AllMusic	4/5 stars
Alternative Press	1.5/5 stars
Pitchfork	5.9/10
Playlouder	4/5 stars
Q	1/5 stars
Rolling Stone	3/5 stars
Sputnikmusic	3.0/5
Stylus	B+
Tiny Mix Tapes	4/5 stars
Uncut	4/5 stars
Silent Uproar	1.8/5 stars

Delìrium Còrdia was met with mixed to positive reviews. Review aggregation site Metacritic lists its average score as 65 out of 100, characterising its reception as "generally favourable". AllMusic gave the album four stars out of five, and Stylus rated it B+, calling it "a balefully themed exercise in prompting your imagination". Rolling Stone awarded it three out of five stars, describing the 20-plus-minute end section as "maddening", though noting that it "demands repeated listens, if only to hear the freakish wonder that is Mike Patton's voice". Pitchfork were more critical, giving the album 5.9 out of 10, calling it "gloomy background music, and little else" though praising the "intensity" of Dave Lombardo's drumming.

== Track listing ==
No.	Title	Writer(s)	Length
1.	"Delìrium Còrdia"	Mike Patton	74:17
Total length:			74:17

Notes

- The name of the piece is sometimes thought to be "Surgical Sound Specimens from the Museum of Skin" (written on the back of the box) or the Richard Selzer M.D. quote (shown above). However, it is officially known as "Delìrium Còrdia".

== Personnel ==
- Mike Patton – vocals, samples, vocal percussion, producer, arrangement, design/layout
- Dave Lombardo – drums
- Buzz Osborne – guitar
- Trevor Dunn – bass
- Max Aguilera-Hellweg – photography (taken with permission from the book The Sacred Heart: An Atlas of the Body Seen Through Invasive Surgery, Bullfinch Press, ISBN 0-8212-2377-1)
- S. Husky Höskulds – engineer
- Mott Lange – assistant engineer
- Gene Grimaldi – mastering
- Martin Kvamme – artwork
- Richard Selzer – voices

== Charts ==
Chart	Peak
Australian Albums (ARIA Charts)	54
U.S. Billboard Top Heatseekers	7
U.S. Billboard Independent Albums	7
French Album Chart	118
U.S. Billboard 200	183
