= A Dreamers Christmas =

Studio album by John Zorn
- Released: October 2011
- Recorded: March–April 2011
- Length: 48:11
- Label: Tzadik TZ 7393
- Producer: John Zorn

John Zorn chronology
At the Gates of Paradise (2011)	A Dreamers Christmas (2011)	Mount Analogue (2012)

The Dreamers chronology
Ipos: Book of Angels Volume 14 (2010)	A Dreamers Christmas (2011)	Pellucidar: A Dreamers Fantabula (2015)

A Dreamers Christmas is an album of Christmas music by John Zorn. It was produced by Zorn and released on his label Tzadik Records in October 2011. It was Zorn's 5th album in 2011.

== Reception ==
Professional ratings
Review scores
Source	Rating
Allmusic	"
Consequence of Sound	3.5/5 stars

Allmusic said "A Dreamer's Christmas is one of those holiday records -- once you hear it, you'll be reaching for it every season." Consequence of Sound called it "interesting, captivating, and pleasing for every member of the family at your holiday party."

== Track listing ==
No.	Title	Writer(s)	Length
1.	"Winter Wonderland"	Felix Bernard	4:13
2.	"Snowfall"	Claude Thornhill	5:10
3.	"Christmas Time Is Here"	Vince Guaraldi	4:37
4.	"Santa's Workshop"	John Zorn	5:21
5.	"Have Yourself a Merry Little Christmas"	Ralph Blane, Hugh Martin	5:16
6.	"Let It Snow! Let It Snow! Let It Snow!"	Jule Styne	4:03
7.	"Santa Claus Is Coming to Town"	John Frederick Coots, Haven Gillespie	6:29
8.	"Magical Sleigh Ride"	Zorn	6:23
9.	"The Christmas Song"	Mel Tormé, Robert Wells	6:33

== Personnel ==
- Marc Ribot − guitars
- Jamie Saft − keyboards
- Kenny Wollesen − vibes, chimes, glockenspiel
- Trevor Dunn − bass guitar, double bass
- Joey Baron − drums
- Cyro Baptista − percussion
- Mike Patton − vocal
