= Nosferatu (John Zorn album) =

Studio album by John Zorn
- Released: April 20, 2012
- Recorded: June 2011
- Genre: Avant-garde experimental music
- Length: 61:14
- Label: Tzadik TZ 7397
- Producer: John Zorn

John Zorn chronology
Pruflas: Book of Angels Volume 18 (2012)	Nosferatu (2012)	Templars: In Sacred Blood (2012)

Nosferatu is the sixteenth studio album by John Zorn released on the Tzadik label in April 2012 on the 100th anniversary of Bram Stoker's death. Zorn wrote the score as a commission for a Polish theatre group's adaptation of Stoker's novel Dracula.

== Reception ==
Professional ratings
Review scores
Source	Rating
Allmusic	3.5/5 stars
All About Jazz	favorable

Allmusic said "With the ever-changing nature of its music and the relatively short cues, Nosferatu feels much shorter than it is; it's a deeply focused work that holds together easily. While its very subject matter dictates sinister overtones, the music found here, with few exceptions, is quite pleasurable and accessible listening; when taken together, its cues suggest a new kind of American Gothic". All About Jazz stated "Zorn's Nosferatu is a generally haunting album, but the composer punctuates the doom and gloom with moments of grandeur, aggression and even outright jazziness... Nosferatu doesn't present any surprises or musical innovation. Nevertheless, the ambient album flows well, and is a solid addition to Zorn's catalog of musical scores with a couple examples of great sax playing".

== Track listing ==
All compositions by John Zorn

No.	Title	Length
1.	"Desolate Landscape"	4:32
2.	"Mina"	3:35
3.	"The Battle of Good and Evil"	5:14
4.	"Sinistera"	3:22
5.	"Van Helsing"	3:25
6.	"Fatal Sunrise"	3:17
7.	"Hypnosis"	2:10
8.	"Lucy"	2:46
9.	"Nosferatu"	2:27
10.	"The Stalking"	7:33
11.	"The Undead"	4:00
12.	"Death Ship"	2:00
13.	"Jonathan Harker"	5:29
14.	"Vampires at Large"	4:17
15.	"Renfield"	3:31
16.	"Stalker Dub"	3:24

== Personnel ==
- John Zorn − piano, alto saxophone, Fender Rhodes, electronics, breath
- Rob Burger − piano, organ
- Bill Laswell − bass
- Kevin Norton − vibraphone, drums, orchestral bells, Tibetan prayer bowls
