= Debutantes & Centipedes =

Studio album by Trevor Dunn's trio-convulsant
- Released: 1998
- Recorded: September 30 and October 1–2, 1997
- Studio: Bay Records Recording Studios, Berkeley, CA
- Genre: Jazz
- Length: 55:29
- Label: Buzz; ZZ 76003
- Producer: Trevor Dunn

Trevor Dunn chronology
| Phillip Greenlief/Trevor Dunn (1996) | Debutantes & Centipedes (1998) | Sister Phantom Owl Fish (2004) |

Debutantes & Centipedes is an album by bassist Trevor Dunn's band trio-convulsant which was released in 1998 on the Dutch Buzz label.

== Reception ==
Professional ratings
Review scores
| Source | Rating |
|---|---|
| Allmusic | 4/5 stars |
| All About Jazz | 4.5/5 stars |

On Allmusic, Tom Schulte observed "This group mixes moody jazz with convulsive rock. ... This is a good album for people who like King Crimson and free jazz, for this album lies at the meeting point of hard, progressive rock and tough, jazz experimentalism". In JazzTimes Bill Milkowski wrote "There is a niche audience for this defiant stuff. It's the crowd that is equally open to Frank Zappa and Sonny Sharrock, Derek Bailey and Naked City, Painkiller and Mingus. Dunn seems to be drawing on all of those influences on this provocative debut, which is not for the faint of heart. But more adventurous listeners may want to go there". All About Jazz's Glenn Astarita said "Debutantes & Centipedes is sure to delight advocates of the New York City Downtown and San Francisco Bay Area scenes where "new" music is at the forefront defying stereotypes and classifications. Trio-Convulsant blend free and mainstream jazz, sub culture grunge rock or at times heavy metal as the overabundance of innovative ideas and impeccable musicianship makes this alliance a triumphant success".

== Track listing ==
All compositions by Trevor Dunn.

1. "Perfumed with Crime" – 4:08
2. "An Attempt at Jealousy" – 6:31
3. "Ann-Margret" – 7:25
4. "Equation of the Found Object" – 6:22
5. "I Remember Freakies Cereal" – 8:09
6. "Premonitions" – 4:02
7. "Echidna" – 4:50
8. "Veiled" – 9:45
9. "Aromateraphy" – 4:17

== Personnel ==
- Trevor Dunn – bass
- Adam Levy – guitar
- Kenny Wollesen – drums
