= Trevor Dunn's Trio-Convulsant =

American avant-garde jazz trio

- Origin: San Francisco, California, United States
- Genres: Avant-garde jazz, experimental, free improvisation
- Years active: 1997–present
- Labels: Buzz, Ipecac
- Members: Trevor Dunn; Mary Halvorson; Ches Smith
- Past members: Adam Levy; Kenny Wollesen
- Website: Ipecac Bio

Trevor Dunn's Trio-Convulsant is an avant-garde jazz trio led by Mr. Bungle bassist Trevor Dunn with guitarist Mary Halvorson and drummer Ches Smith.

AllMusic said the band combines "moody jazz with convulsive rock."

== Discography ==
- Debutantes & Centipedes (Buzz, 1998)
- Sister Phantom Owl Fish (Ipecac, 2004)
- Séances avec Folie à Quatre (Pyroclastic Records, 2022)
