= Trevor Dunn =

American bassist (born 1968)

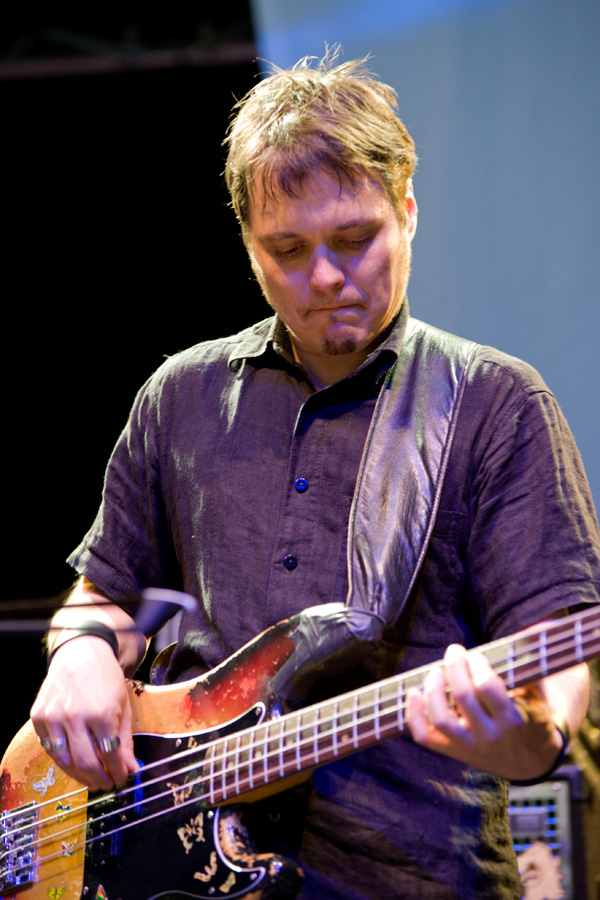
- Dunn performing in 2012

Background information
- Born: Trevor Roy Dunn; January 30, 1968 (age 58); Eureka, California, U.S.
- Genres: Avant-garde, experimental, Avant-garde jazz, free jazz, free improvisation, heavy metal, alternative rock, punk rock, jazz-rock
- Occupations: Musician, composer
- Instruments: Bass guitar, double bass
- Years active: 1983–present
- Website: trevordunn.net

Trevor Roy Dunn (born January 30, 1968) is an American bassist and composer. He came to prominence in the 1990s with the experimental band Mr. Bungle. While performing with Mr. Bungle, he would dress similar to the St. Pauli Girl. He has since worked in an array of musical styles, including with saxophonist/composer John Zorn, in Mr. Bungle guitarist Trey Spruance's Secret Chiefs 3, and with his own avant-garde jazz/rock ensemble Trevor Dunn's Trio-Convulsant. He is also a member of the bands Fantômas and Tomahawk alongside Mr. Bungle frontman Mike Patton.

== Career ==
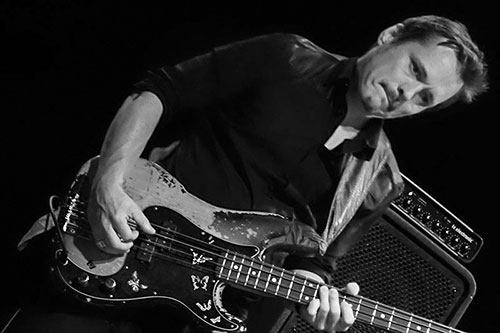
Dunn in Aarhus, Denmark (2016)

After four years of studying the clarinet, Dunn began playing electric bass at the age of thirteen. His earliest musical influences included the Beach Boys, Blondie, Cheap Trick and Kiss. He later studied classical double bass at Humboldt State University.

In 1998, Dunn formed his Trio-Convulsant. Their first release, Debutantes & Centipedes, features Dunn on bass, Adam Levy on guitar and Kenny Wollesen on drums. The album Sister Phantom Owl Fish on Ipecac (2004) included a new lineup, with Dunn joined by Ches Smith on percussion and Mary Halvorson on guitar. Séances (2022), a concept album inspired by the Convulsionnaires of Saint-Médard and credited to "Trevor Dunn's Trio-Convulsant avec Folie à Quatre", features Halvorson and Smith alongside violinist/violist Carla Kihlstedt, flautist Anna Webber, clarinetist Oscar Noriega, and cellist Mariel Roberts.

Dunn has participated in dozens of other recordings, both as a main collaborator and a guest musician. He is part of Mike Pride's MPThree, David Krakauer's Klezmer Madness, and the Nels Cline Singers. He has also played with Afro-Mystic, Ben Goldberg, Brian "Head" Welch, Graham Connah's Sour Note Seven, Jess Jones Quartet, Junk Genius, Laplante/Dunn/Smith, John Zorn's Electric Masada, Matisyahu, Rova Saxophone Quartet, Sean Lennon, Suit of Lights, Rob Price Quartet, Tin Hat Trio and Tipsy.

== Instruments ==
- 1975 Fender Precision Bass (his primary electric bass; tuned to B-E-A-D for Fantômas)
- 1950s Czech double bass
- 1991 Alembic Europa 5-string
- Ken Lawrence 5-string fretless
- Guild Ashbory
- 1966 Guild Starfire

== Discography ==
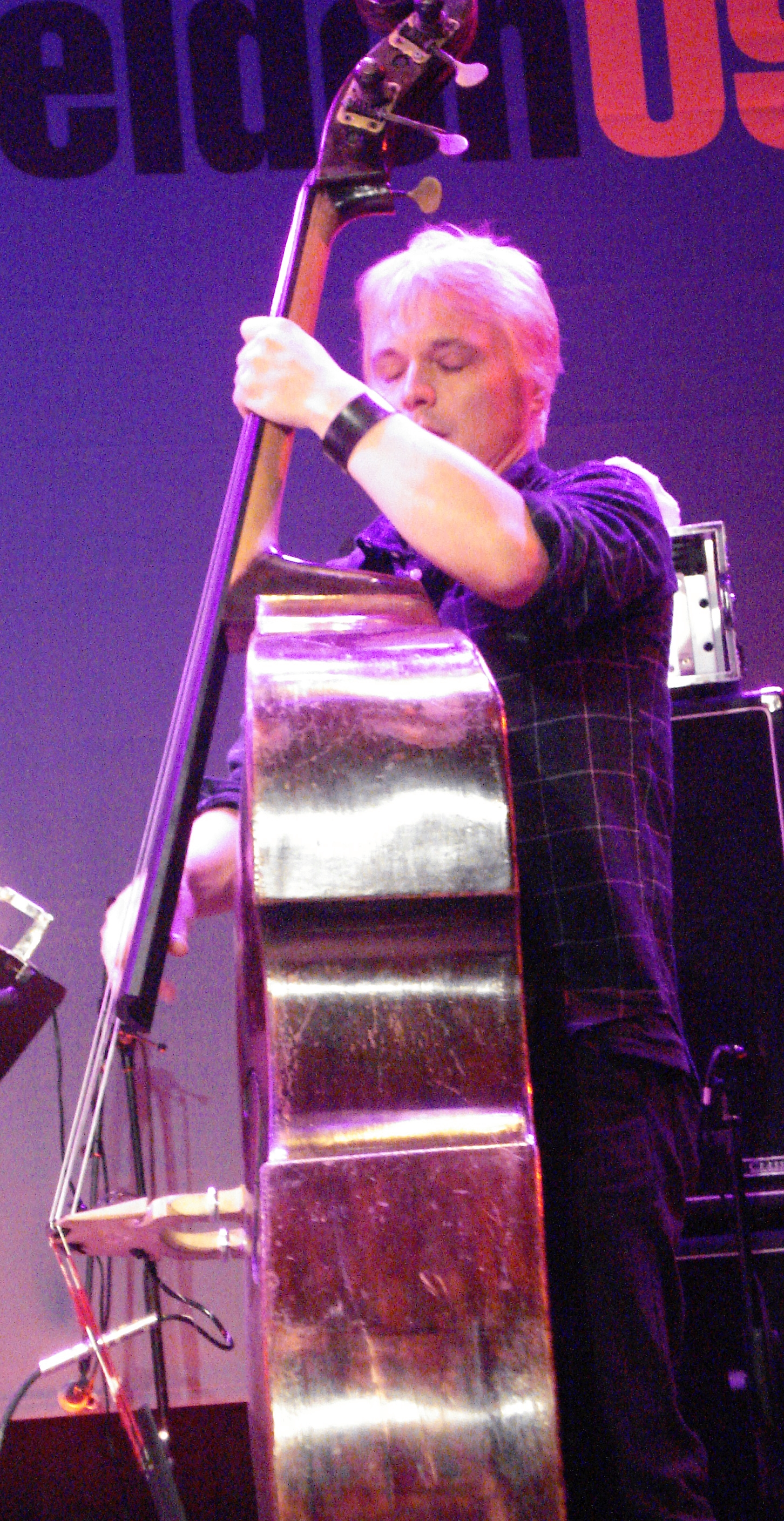
Dunn, Saalfelden Jazz Festival, 2009

=== As leader or co-leader ===
- 1996 Phillip Greenlief/Trevor Dunn with Phillip Greenlief (Evander)
- 1998 Trio-Convulsant's Debutantes & Centipedes with Adam Levy & Kenny Wollesen (Buzz)
- 2004 Trio-Convulsant's Sister Phantom Owl Fish with Ches Smith & Mary Halvorson (Ipecac)
- 2005 untitled with Shelley Burgon (self-released)
- 2005 At Blim with Shelley Burgon (Audiobot)
- 2007 Baltimore with Shelley Burgon (Skirl)
- 2008 Four Films (Tzadik)
- 2008 White with Foam (Ipecac)
- 2016 Strength & Power with Roswell Rudd, Jamie Saft, and Balázs Pándi (RareNoiseRecords)
- 2019 Nocturnes (Tzadik)
- 2022 Trio-Convulsant avec Folie à Quatre's Séances with Ches Smith, Mary Halvorson, Carla Kihlstedt, Anna Webber, Oscar Noriega & Mariel Roberts (Pyroclastic)
- 2026 Nethering with Colin Stetson and Greg Fox (Envision)

=== As band member ===
With Mr. Bungle

- 1991 − Mr. Bungle (Warner Bros.)
- 1995 − Disco Volante (Warner Bros.)
- 1999 − California (Warner Bros.)
- 2020 − The Raging Wrath of the Easter Bunny Demo (Ipecac)

With Secret Chiefs 3

- 1996 − First Grand Constitution and Bylaws

With Fantômas

- 1999 − Fantômas
- 2001 − The Director's Cut
- 2002 − Millennium Monsterwork 2000 (by The Fantômas Melvins Big Band)
- 2004 − Delìrium Còrdia
- 2005 − Suspended Animation
- 2008 − Live from London 2006 DVD (by The Fantômas Melvins Big Band)

With Melvins (Lite)

- 2006 − A Live History of Gluttony and Lust (bass guitar; double bass for all subsequent releases)
- 2012 − Freak Puke (Melvins Lite)
- 2013 – Everybody Loves Sausages (on three songs, also sings on "Timothy Leary Lives")
- 2016 – Basses Loaded (on "Planet Destructo")

With The Nels Cline Singers

- Macroscope (Mack Avenue, 2014)

With Tomahawk

- 2013 − Oddfellows
- 2021 – Tonic Immobility

With Ahleuchatistas

- 2023 – Expansion (Riverworm)

=== As sideman ===
With Erik Friedlander

- Grains of Paradise (Tzadik, 2001)
- Broken Arm Trio (Skipstone, 2008)
- 50 Miniatures for Improvising Quintet (Skipstone, 2010)
- Bonebridge (Skipstone, 2011)
- Nighthawks (Skipstone, 2014)
- Oscalypso (Skipstone, 2015)

With Andrew D'Angelo

- Skadra Degis (Skirl, 2008)
- Norman (2014)

With Chris Speed

- Endangered Blood (Skirl, 2010)
- Endangered Blood: Work Your Magic (Skirl, 2013)

With Curtis Hasselbring

- The New Mellow Edwards (Skirl, 2006)
- The New Mellow Edwards: Big Choantza (Skirl, 2015)

With Eyvind Kang

- The Narrow Garden (Ipecac, 2012)

With Jamie Saft

- 2009 – Black Shabbis

With John Zorn

- 2000 − The Big Gundown (15th Anniversary Special Edition bonus tracks only)
- 2001 − The Gift
- 2002 − Cobra: John Zorn's Game Pieces Volume 2
- 2002 − Filmworks XII: Three Documentaries
- 2002 − Filmworks XIII: Invitation to a Suicide
- 2003 − Filmworks XIV: Hiding and Seeking
- 2004 − 50th Birthday Celebration Volume 4 with Electric Masada
- 2005 − Electric Masada: At the Mountains of Madness with Electric Masada
- 2005 − Filmworks Anthology – 20 Years of Soundtrack Music
- 2006 − Moonchild: Songs Without Words with Moonchild
- 2006 − Astronome with Moonchild
- 2007 − Six Litanies for Heliogabalus with Moonchild
- 2007 − Asmodeus: Book of Angels Volume 7 with Marc Ribot
- 2008 − The Dreamers with The Dreamers
- 2008 − The Crucible with Moonchild
- 2009 − O'o with The Dreamers
- 2010 − Ipos: Book of Angels Volume 14 with The Dreamers
- 2010 − Ipsissimus with Moonchild
- 2010 − Interzone
- 2010 − Filmworks XXIV: The Nobel Prizewinner
- 2010 − The Goddess – Music for the Ancient of Days
- 2011 − Nova Express with the Nova Quartet
- 2011 − At the Gates of Paradise
- 2011 − A Dreamers Christmas with The Dreamers
- 2012 − Templars: In Sacred Blood with Moonchild
- 2012 − Enigmata
- 2012 − Rimbaud
- 2012 − A Vision in Blakelight
- 2012 − The Concealed
- 2013 − Dreamachines with the Nova Quartet
- 2014 – On Leaves of Grass with the Nova Quartet
- 2014 – Valentine's Day
- 2014 − The Last Judgment
- 2015 – Pellucidar: A Dreamers Fantabula with The Dreamers
- 2015 − The True Discoveries of Witches and Demons
- 2015 − The Song Project Live at Le Poisson Rouge
- 2017 − The Garden of Earthly Delights
- 2018 − Insurrection
- 2018 − Salem, 1692
- 2019 − The Hierophant
- 2020 – Calculus

With Jozef Dumoulin Trio

- 2011 − Rainbow Body with Jozef Dumoulin (Rhodes) and Eric Thielemans (drums)

With the Rob Price Quartet

- 2004 − At Sunset with Ellery Eskelin and Joey Baron
- 2007 − I Really Do Not See the Signal with Jim Black replacing Baron

With King Buzzo

- 2020 − Gift of Sacrifice (Ipecac)

=== Album collaborations ===
- 1999 − PantyChrist by Bob Ostertag, Justin Bond and Otomo Yoshihide
- 2004 − Eucademix by Yuka Honda

=== Guest appearances ===
- 1994 − Dressing for Pleasure by Jon Hassell & Bluescreen (on the songs "Villa Narco" and "Mati")
- 1996 − In These Great Times by John Schott
- 1996 − Trip Tease by Tipsy
- 1999 − Memory Is an Elephant by Tin Hat Trio
- 2000 − Helium by Tin Hat Trio
- 2002 − The Rabbi's Lover by Jenny Scheinman
- 2003 − Dimly Lit: Collected Soundtracks 1996–2002 by Doug Wieselman
- 2004 − Eucademix by Yuka Honda
- 2004 − Shalagaster by Jenny Scheinman
- 2005 − Nihm by Okkyung Lee
- 2006 − Starlings by Billy Martin
- 2008 − Save Me from Myself by Head
- 2008 − Terror Syndrome by Terror Syndrome
- 2009 − Blackbird's Echo by Niobe
- 2026 - Burnout by Claudio Sanchez
