= Millennium Monsterwork 2000 =

Millennium Monsterwork

Live album by The Fantômas Melvins Big Band
- Released: April 1, 2002
- Recorded: December 31, 2000
- Genre: Experimental metal
- Length: 40:41
- Label: Ipecac
- Producer: Vince DeFranco

Fantômas chronology
| The Director's Cut (2001) | Millennium Monsterwork 2000 (2002) | Delìrium Còrdia (2004) |

Melvins chronology
| Colossus of Destiny (2001) | Millennium Monsterwork 2000 (2002) | Hostile Ambient Takeover (2002) |

Professional ratings
Review scores
| Source | Rating |
|---|---|
| Allmusic | 2.5/5 stars |
| Pitchfork Media | (4.9/10) |

Millennium Monsterwork is a live album by Fantômas and Melvins taken from a New Year's Eve 2000 performance at Slim's which was released in 2002 through Ipecac Recordings.

== Track listing ==
| No. | Title | Writer(s) | Length |
|---|---|---|---|
| 1. | "Good Morning Slaves" (Page 27) | Mike Patton | 1:47 |
| 2. | "Night Goat" | Melvins | 5:05 |
| 3. | "The Omen (Ave Satani)" | Jerry Goldsmith | 1:58 |
| 4. | "Cholo Charlie" (Page 3) | Patton | 1:03 |
| 5. | "White Men Are the Vermin of the Earth" | David Scott Stone | 1:01 |
| 6. | "Terpulative Guns & Drugs" (Page 28) | Patton | 2:45 |
| 7. | "Ol' Black Stooges" | Dale Crover, Buzz Osborne | 2:33 |
| 8. | "Ripping Chicken Meat" (Page 1) | Patton | 1:51 |
| 9. | "The Bit" | Crover | 5:55 |
| 10. | "Musthing with the Phunts" (Page 29) | Patton | 1:00 |
| 11. | "Me and the Flamer" (Page 14) | Patton | 4:03 |
| 12. | "She's a Puker" (Page 6) | Patton | 1:08 |
| 13. | "The Turkey Doctor" (Page 10) | Patton | 1:05 |
| 14. | "Hooch" | Melvins | 1:12 |
| 15. | "Mombius Hibachi" | Melvins | 1:30 |
| 16. | "Liquorton Gooksburg" (Page 23) | Patton | 0:46 |
| 17. | "Skin Horse" | Osborne | 3:35 |
| 18. | "Cape Fear" | Bernard Herrmann | 1:51 |
| 19. | "Bonus" | | 0:13 |

19 is uncredited in the packaging; the title was given as "Bonus" in the Bandcamp listing of the album.

== Personnel ==
- Dale Crover - drums, vocals
- Trevor Dunn - bass
- King Buzzo - guitar, vocals
- Dave Lombardo - drums
- Mike Patton - vocals, samples, "electronics"
- Kevin Rutmanis - bass
- Dave Stone - guitar, "electronics"

=== Additional personnel ===
- Vince DeFranco - producer, engineer
- John Golden - mastering
- Vinny Palese - live recording
- Randy Hawkins - live sound
- Mackie Osborne - art
