= Short for Something =

Studio album by New Klezmer Trio
- Released: June 27, 2000
- Recorded: November 1999 at Bay Records, Berkeley, California
- Genre: Jazz, Klezmer
- Length: 65:41
- Label: Tzadik TZ 7141
- Producer: Ben Goldberg

New Klezmer Trio chronology
| Melt Zonk Rewire (1995) | Short for Something (2000) |

Short for Something is the third album by the New Klezmer Trio, Ben Goldberg - clarinet, Dan Seamans - bass, and Kenny Wollesen - drums, which was released on the Tzadik label in 2000.

== Reception ==
Professional ratings
Review scores
| Source | Rating |
|---|---|
| Allmusic | 4/5 stars |

In his review for Allmusic, Stacia Proefrock observed "Their music is fully embedded in modern creative avant-garde jazz, yet still manages to nod its head to the sounds of old Cracow, creating a cauldron of spiritual yearnings, sadness, chaos, visions, and grace".

== Track listing ==
All compositions by Ben Goldberg except as indicated

1. "The Because Of" - 7:09
2. "Short for Something" - 3:56
3. "Fast" - 10:47
4. "Sequential" - 0:50
5. "Obsessive" - 2:35
6. "All Chords Stand for Other Chords" - 5:41
7. "Fomus Homus" - 5:42
8. "Seven Phrases" - 4:27
9. "Complicated" - 3:42
10. "LBD" - 2:42
11. "Halves" - 6:02
12. "Fly in the Ointment" - 3:08
13. "Freylekhs fun der Khupe" (Traditional) - 4:31

== Personnel ==
- Ben Goldberg - clarinet
- Dan Seamans - bass
- Kenny Wollesen - drums
