= In Search of the Miraculous (John Zorn album) =

Studio album by John Zorn
- Released: February 2010
- Recorded: September – October 2009
- Genre: Jazz
- Length: 51:25
- Label: Tzadik TZ 7379
- Producer: John Zorn

John Zorn chronology
Mycale: Book of Angels Volume 13 (2010)	In Search of the Miraculous (2010)	Ipos: Book of Angels Volume 14 (2010)

In Search of the Miraculous is an album by composer John Zorn released as a part of Tzadik's Archival series in 2010.

== Reception ==
Professional ratings
Review scores
Source	Rating
Allmusic	4/5 stars
All About Jazz	favorable
Free Jazz Collective	3/5 stars
PopMatters	4/10 stars

Allmusic awarded the album 4 stars. Writing for All About Jazz, Warren Allen stated "Some may find it difficult to embrace the mystical/minimalist aesthetic captured here, but there is so much art present. For Zorn as a composer, the writing is an important step in the development of his file card music. For the musicians, the songs contain deeply passionate performances that sound effortless, even where they are certainly not. And for the listener, there are pleasures to be found either just in listening or in trying to unwind some of the layers within this suite of music. This is simply an album to lose oneself within".

The Free Jazz Collective called it "A typical atmospheric piece of music, with quite repetitive piano phrases based on klezmer scales. Very lyrical and nice, sometimes with odd rhyhms... Despite this stellar list of Tzadik musicians, the music itself has a kind of déjà-vu effect, even if some of the playing is more emphatic than on other albums". PopMatters correspondent Benjamin Aspray was also unimpressed noting "his new record features many of the virtues that set even his lesser works above the vast majority of experimental music. The compositions are balanced just right between being intricate and hanging loose, and the piano-led ensemble assembled here plays through them with precision and restraint. The production is crisp and clear; the vibes shimmer on top of sinewy basslines, and no one overtakes anyone else. In other words, the whole thing is very, very professional. And that’s, unfortunately, all it really is... knowing John Zorn, he wanted the opportunity to force himself into even less expected musical territory. He’s succeeded, and shown the world that he can make faceless, functional music with the best of the world’s shopping network jingle-writers. Now, hopefully, he realizes that being boring is, well, boring, and goes back to what he does best: being awesome".

== Track listing ==
All compositions by John Zorn.

1. "Prelude: From a Great Temple" – 4:15
2. "Sacred Dance (Invocation)" – 4:47
3. "The Book of Shadows" – 5:13
4. "Affirmation" – 5:04
5. "The Magus" – 9:08
6. "Hymn for a New Millennium" – 5:31
7. "Journey of the Magicians" – 4:02
8. "Mythic Etude" – 7:27
9. "Postlude: Prayers and Enchantment" – 5:58

== Personnel ==
- Shanir Ezra Blumenkranz – electric bass
- Rob Burger – piano, organ
- Greg Cohen – acoustic bass
- Ben Perowsky – drums
- Kenny Wollesen – vibraphone
