= Ben Goldberg =

American clarinet player and composer (born 1959)

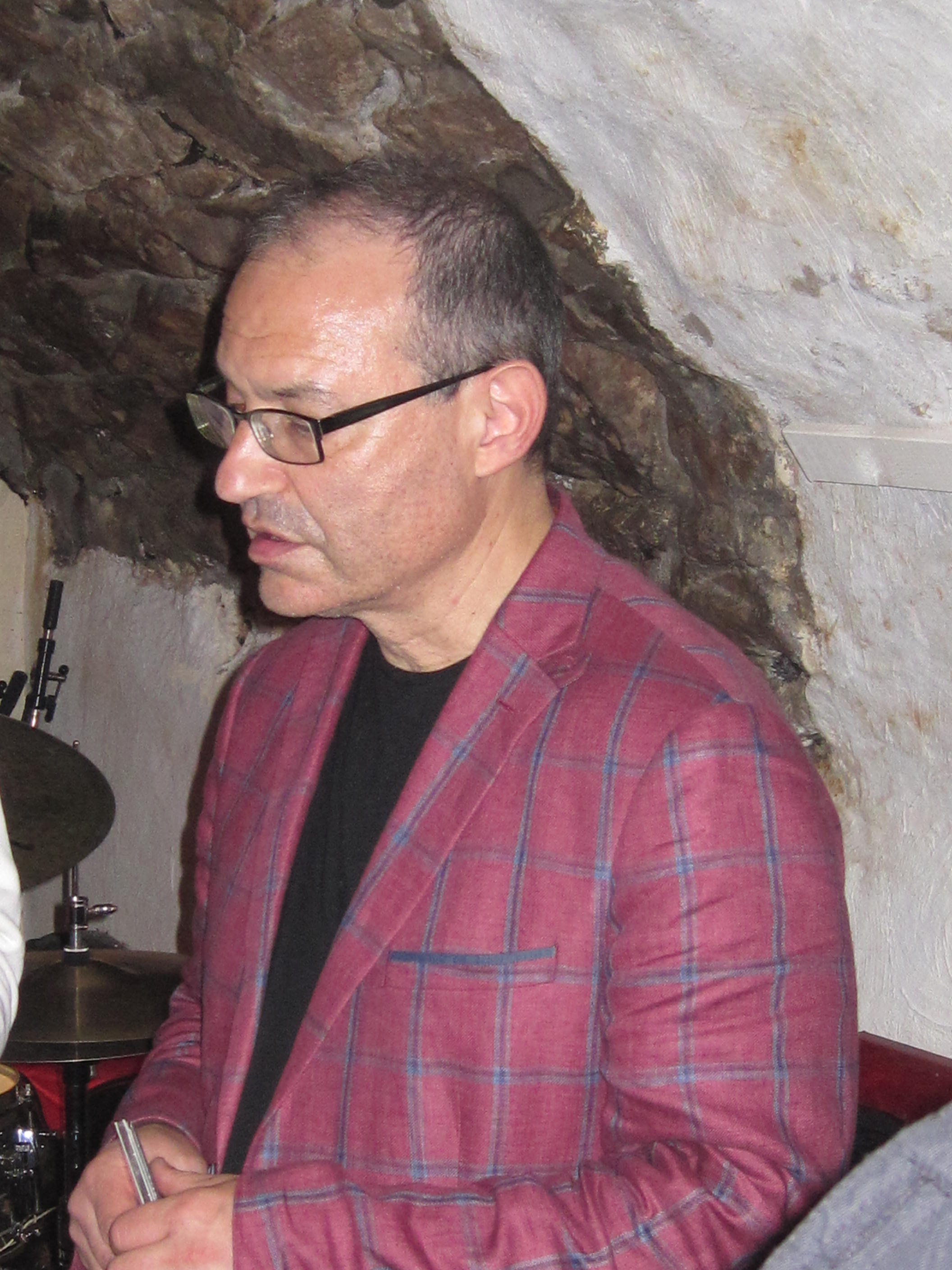

Background information
- Born: August 8, 1959 (age 67); Denver, Colorado, United States
- Genres: Jazz, free jazz, klezmer
- Occupations: Musician, composer
- Instrument: Clarinet
- Label: BAG Production
- Website: bengoldberg.net

Ben Goldberg (born August 8, 1959) is an American clarinet player and composer.

== Career ==
In the early 1990s, Ben Goldberg performed alongside electric bassist Dan Seamans and percussionist Kenny Wollesen as the New Klezmer Trio. They went on to produce three albums and the free improvisation on "Masks and Faces" was described as having "kicked open the door for radical experiments with Ashkenazi roots music." Goldberg's musicality has influenced and inspired local musicians in the San Francisco Bay Area.

Goldberg is also the founder of the music label BAG Production.

Recently Goldberg has branched out into songwriting. His "Orphic Machine" project, largely commissioned by Chamber Music America, was performed in Los Angeles. The song-cycle is based on the writings of Allen Grossman and, for one critic, "the piece's thoughtful, sprawling compositions course through such a variety of styles and open-ended impulses that it would be tempting to dub this a new kind of world music". Regarding songwriting and composing, in a 2010 profile piece in All About Jazz, Goldberg said, "I don't just want to give people something that they can appreciate or understand, or that makes them think, or something like that. I used to kind of feel that that's what I wanted to do, but that's not what I want anymore. I want to give people something that they can love."

In 2011, Goldberg was named the No. 1 Rising Star Clarinetist by the Down Beat Critic's Poll.

== Discography ==
=== As leader ===
- New Klezmer Trio – Masks and Faces (Tzadik, 1991)
- The Relative Value of Things (33 1/4), with Kenny Wollesen (1993)
- Junk Genius – Junk Genius (Knitting Factory Works) with John Schott, Trevor Dunn, and Kenny Wollesen (1995)
- New Klezmer Trio – Melt Zonk Rewire (Tzadik, 1995)
- Light at the Crossroads (Songlines) with Marty Ehrlich (1997)
- What Comes Before (Tzadik), reflections on post-tonal harmonic structures with John Schott and Michael Sarin (1998)
- Twelve Minor (Avant) (1998)
- Ben Goldberg Trio – Here By Now (Music and Arts) with Trevor Dunn and Elliot Humberto Kavee (1998)
- Junk Genius – Ghost of Electricity (Songlines) (1999)
- New Klezmer Trio – Short for Something (Tzadik, 2000)
- Almost Never (nuscope) with John Schott and Trevor Dunn (2000)
- Ben Goldberg – Eight Phrases for Jefferson Rubin (Victo) (2004)
- Ben Goldberg Quintet – The Door, the Hat, the Chair, the Fact (Cryptogramophone), a record of compositions dedicated to Steve Lacy (2006)
- Plays Monk (Long Song Records, 2007) – with Scott Amendola and Devra Hoff
- Tin Hat – The Sad Machinery of Spring (Rykodisc, 2007)
- Ben Goldberg – Go Home (BAG Production, 2009)
- Ben Goldberg Trio – Speech Communication (Tzadik, 2009) – with Greg Cohen and Kenny Wollesen
- Clarinet Thing – Cry, Want (BC Records, 2009)
- Tin Hat – Foreign Legion (BAG Production, 2010)
- Ben Goldberg Quartet – Baal: Book of Angels Volume 15 (Tzadik, 2010) – John Zorn's Masada Book 2
- Tin Hat – The Rain is a Handsome Animal (New Amsterdam, 2012)
- Subatomic Particle Homesick Blues (BAG Production, 2013) – with Joshua Redman, Ron Miles, Ches Smith, Scott Amendola, and Devra Hoff
- Unfold Ordinary Mind (BAG Production, 2013) – with Ellery Eskelin, Nels Cline, and Ches Smith
- Worry Later (BAG Production, 2014) – Thelonious Monk compositions
- DIALOGUE (BAG Production, 2015) – with Myra Melford
- Orphic Machine (BAG Production, 2015)
- Vol. 1: The Humanities (BAG Production, 2017)
- Good Day for Cloud Fishing (Pyroclastic, 2019) – to poems by Dean Young

=== As sideman ===
With Nels Cline

- New Monastery (Cryptogramophone, 2006)
- Lovers (Blue Note, 2016)

With Kris Davis

- Save Your Breath (Clean Feed, 2015)

With Allison Miller's Boom Tic Boom

- Otis the Polar Bear (Royal Potato Family, 2016)

With Jamie Saft

- Borscht Belt Studies (Tzadik, 2011)

With Myra Melford

- Myra Melford's Be Bread – The Whole Tree Gone (Firehouse 12, 2010)
