= Ken Lawrence Instruments =

Guitar manufacturer

- Company type: Music Company
- Industry: Musical instruments
- Founder: Ken Lawrence
- Area served: Global
- Key people: Ken Lawrence
- Products: Electric guitars Bass guitars
- Number of employees: 1
- Website: kenlawrence.homestead.com

Ken Lawrence Instruments is a manufacturer of custom guitars and bass guitars founded by Ken Lawrence in 1986. Besides building instruments, Lawrence has also performed as a bassist both live and in recording sessions. Lawrence began building instruments in 1981 at Moonstone Guitars, and five years later, he set up his own company.

Lawrence mainly builds handcrafted bass guitars with a delivery time close to a year with 20 to 25 built each year, but he has also built guitars for James Hetfield, guitarist and vocalist of the American band Metallica. Most of the guitars built for Hetfield conform to the measurements of his ESP Explorer but have slight differences in the headstock and custom inlays on the fretboard. He has also built a five-string fretless bass for Trevor Dunn of the American band Mr. Bungle.

== Construction ==
All instruments are built on an individual basis for each customer. Lawrence avoids the use of endangered woods and advocates the use of "responsibly harvested" rain forest hardwoods for his instruments. The instrument bodies are usually made in Ash, Alder, or Mahogany, but other types of wood are available if the customer demands it (such as Jamaican blue wood). All necks are made of eastern hard rock maple and are usually fitted with fretboards in grenadilla or katalox. All bass guitars can be ordered in different finishes, with or without frets, and with a variety pickups and preamps.

== Line of bass guitars ==
=== Associate ===
- Sculpted two piece body of select southern ash or alder.
- Graphite reinforced maple neck with 24 fret rosewood or grenadillo fretboard.
- Custom made Bass Line pickups with 3 band preamp and black hardware.
- Available as four, five and six strings.

=== Brase ===
- Sculpted selects ash body with upper horn connected to neck at the 11th fret.
- Hard rock maple neck with graphite spars and dual flex truss rod.
- Custom Bass line pickups and preamps.
- Available in five or six stringed versions.

=== Chamberbass ===
- Sculpted semihollow mahogany body with red wood top and soundholes.
- Extended ebony tailpiece and heightadjustable ebony piezo bridge.
- Custom Bass line pickups and 3 band preamp.
- Available as five or six stringed versions.
