= The Relative Value of Things =

Studio album by Ben Goldberg & Kenny Wollesen
- Released: 1992
- Recorded: April 1992
- Genre: Jazz, Klezmer
- Length: 71:53
- Label: 33¼ Records
- Producer: Ben Goldberg

Ben Goldberg chronology
Masks and Faces (1991)	The Relative Value of Things (1992)	Junk Genius (1995)

The Relative Value of Things is an album by clarinetist Ben Goldberg and drummer Kenny Wollesen which was released on the 33¼ Records label in 1992.

== Reception ==
Professional ratings
Review scores
Source	Rating
Allmusic	4/5 stars

In his review for Allmusic, Thom Jurek observed "This is a gorgeous little date between two of the downtown scene's most singing and adaptable personages. Here is a program of gently swinging originals and jazz nuggets that offer a startling view of all the tonal possibilities offered by such a stripped down pairing".

== Track listing ==
All compositions by Ben Goldberg except as indicated

1. "Introspection" (Thelonious Monk) - 6:27
2. "The Voice" - 7:02
3. "Hangman Roach" - 2:58
4. "Salt Peanuts" (Dizzy Gillespie, Kenny Clarke) - 3:36
5. "Kabenny" - 18:55
6. "Light Blue" (Monk) - 4:40
7. "Folleree Folleroo" - 2:20
8. "Pursuit of Facts" - 7:30
9. "Two Nexters" - 5:05
10. "Spot" - 5:42
11. "Diagonal Man" - 3:37
12. "Children's Song" - 4:01

== Personnel ==
- Ben Goldberg - clarinet, bass clarinet
- Kenny Wollesen - drums
