= Interzone (album) =

Studio album by John Zorn
- Released: November 23, 2010
- Recorded: June–July, 2010 in New York City
- Length: 54:18
- Label: Tzadik
- Producer: John Zorn

John Zorn chronology
What Thou Wilt (2010)	Interzone (2010)	Caym: Book of Angels Volume 17 (2010)

Interzone is the thirteenth studio album by American composer John Zorn developed to pay tribute to the influence of writers William S. Burroughs and Brion Gysin and released on Zorn's Tzadik label in 2010.

== Reception ==
The Allmusic review by Thom Jurek awarded the album 4 stars stating "Interzone is one of John Zorn's more ambitious multi-part pieces. While some claim this is a return to the file card process and recordings like Spillane, Interzone feels different: it's more an ensemble work even when it travels through genres, dynamics, textures, and musical geographies".

Professional ratings
Review scores
Source	Rating
Allmusic	4/5 stars

== Track listing ==
All compositions by John Zorn

1. Interzone 1 - 15:20
2. Interzone 2 - 27:37
3. Interzone 3 - 11:21

== Personnel ==
- Ikue Mori: Electronics
- John Zorn: Saxophone
- Marc Ribot: Guitars, Banjo, Sintir, Cümbüs
- Kenny Wollesen: Drums, Vibes, Chimes, Typani, Wollesonics, Percussion
- Cyro Baptista: Percussion
- John Medeski: Keyboards
- Trevor Dunn: Long assortment of Bass
