= Mount Analogue (album) =

Studio album by John Zorn
- Released: 31 January 2012
- Recorded: June 2011; East Side Sound, NY
- Genre: Avant-garde, jazz, experimental music
- Length: 38:21
- Label: Tzadik TZ 7394
- Producer: John Zorn

John Zorn chronology
A Dreamers Christmas (2011)	Mount Analogue (2012)	The Gnostic Preludes (2012)

Mount Analogue is the fifteenth studio album by John Zorn released in January 2012 on the Tzadik label.

== Reception ==
Professional ratings
Review scores
Source	Rating
Allmusic	4/5 stars
Free Jazz Collective	4/5 stars

Allmusic said "From Jewish and other Middle Eastern folk musics to soundtrack atmospherics, exotica-tinged jazz, Latin rhythms, and contemporary classical inquiries into minimalism, tone, space, color, and counterpoint, all are on display in this wonderfully musical, meditative, hypnotic, and "mystical" work. The accessibility factor in Mount Analogue is high; what begins as a musical question eventually resolves, usually through a circular method that is deeply satisfying". Martin Schray commented "The musicians easily move between angular new classical music, restrained mumbling and panting, 1950s film noir soundtracks, Jewish or Middle Eastern folk, the typical John Zorn exotica, jazz, lonely piano tunes, or minimalist approaches. Every note is exactly at the right place, there is not one bell tone too much, which creates a lush atmosphere on the one hand but the spooky and creepy elements refer to a dark world also inherent in this music".

== Track listing ==
No.	Title	Writer(s)	Length
1.	"Mount Analogue"	Zorn	38:21

== Personnel ==
- Brian Marsella – piano, organ, vocals
- Kenny Wollesen – vibraphone, chimes, vocals
- Shanir Ezra Blumenkranz – bass, oud, gimbri, vocals
- Tim Keiper – calabash, drums, percussion, orchestral bells, vocals
- Cyro Baptista – percussion, prayer bells, vocals
