= Fantômas (Fantômas album) =

Studio album by Fantômas
- Released: April 27, 1999
- Studio: Brilliant (San Francisco)
- Genre: Avant-garde metal
- Length: 42:46
- Label: Ipecac
- Producer: Mike Patton

Fantômas chronology
Fantômas (1999)	The Director's Cut (2001)

Fantômas is the debut studio album by American experimental metal supergroup Fantômas. It was released on April 27, 1999, and was the first album released on Ipecac Recordings.

== Reception ==
Professional ratings
Review scores
Source	Rating
AllMusic	4/5 stars
Chronicles of Chaos	8.5/10
Collector's Guide to Heavy Metal	7/10

Greg Prato of AllMusic said, "if you're looking for something completely original and cutting edge, Fantômas is highly recommended".

== Track listing ==
All songs written by Mike Patton.

No.	Title	Length
1.	"Book 1: Page 1"	1:33
2.	"Book 1: Page 2"	1:38
3.	"Book 1: Page 3"	1:08
4.	"Book 1: Page 4"	4:22
5.	"Book 1: Page 5"	0:45
6.	"Book 1: Page 6"	1:11
7.	"Book 1: Page 7"	0:54
8.	"Book 1: Page 8"	1:01
9.	"Book 1: Page 9"	0:47
10.	"Book 1: Page 10"	1:20
11.	"Book 1: Page 11"	0:53
12.	"Book 1: Page 12"	1:58
13.	Untitled	0:03
14.	"Book 1: Page 14"	2:11
15.	"Book 1: Page 15"	2:13
16.	"Book 1: Page 16"	0:57
17.	"Book 1: Page 17"	0:50
18.	"Book 1: Page 18"	5:06
19.	"Book 1: Page 19"	1:21
20.	"Book 1: Page 20"	0:29
21.	"Book 1: Page 21"	0:38
22.	"Book 1: Page 22"	2:11
23.	"Book 1: Page 23"	0:56
24.	"Book 1: Page 24"	0:52
25.	"Book 1: Page 25"	0:52
26.	"Book 1: Page 26"	1:15
27.	"Book 1: Page 27"	1:37
28.	"Book 1: Page 28"	1:35
29.	"Book 1: Page 29"	1:11
30.	"Book 1: Page 30"	0:33
Total length:		42:46

Notes

- Track 13 is not listed, as thirteen is considered an unlucky number. There is no song on this track, simply the fading out of a cymbal from "Book 1: Page 12", the previous track. The next Fantômas album, The Director's Cut, also has silence in place of track 13.

== Personnel ==
Fantômas

- Mike Patton – vocals, samples, production, album cover artwork
- Dave Lombardo – drums
- Buzz Osborne – guitar
- Trevor Dunn – bass

Production

- Billy Anderson – engineering
- Brian Simakis credited as Gummo – engineering
- Different Fur – mixing
- Adam Muñoz – mixing
- George Horn – mastering
- Zuccatosa – album artwork
- John Yates – album artwork
