= The Dreamers (album) =

Studio album by John Zorn
- Released: May 18, 2008
- Recorded: September 2007
- Genres: Avant-garde, surf music, jazz
- Length: 52:41
- Label: Tzadik
- Producer: John Zorn

The Dreamers chronology
The Dreamers (2008)	O'o (2009)

John Zorn chronology
Filmworks XIX: The Rain Horse (2008)	The Dreamers (2008)	Lucifer: Book of Angels Volume 10 (2008)

The Dreamers is an album by John Zorn released in 2008 featuring performances by a band which would later become known as The Dreamers. It is viewed as continuation of the Music Romance tradition expressed on his 2001 album The Gift.

== Reception ==
The Allmusic review by Thom Jurek awarded the album 4 stars stating "This set is not only a fitting complement to The Gift, which was fantastic in its own right, but is an actual next-step recording: it's focused, tight, humorous, and a gas to listen to from beginning to end."

Professional ratings
Review scores
Source	Rating
Allmusic	4/5 stars

== Track listing ==
All compositions by John Zorn

1. "Mow Mow" – 3:03
2. "Uluwati" – 3:37
3. "A Ride on Cottonfair" – 4:22
4. "Anulikwutsayl" – 9:02
5. "Toys" – 2:46
6. "Of Wonder and Certainty (for Lou Reed)" – 4:30
7. "Mystic Circles" – 6:08
8. "Nekashim" – 3:56
9. "Exodus" – 7:02
10. "Forbidden Tears" – 3:07
11. "Raksasa" – 5:15

- Recorded at East Side Sound, New York City in September 2007

== Personnel ==
- Cyro Baptista – percussion
- Joey Baron – drums
- Trevor Dunn – bass
- Marc Ribot – guitar
- Jamie Saft – keyboards
- Kenny Wollesen – vibes
- John Zorn – alto saxophone
