= Ipos: Book of Angels Volume 14 =

Studio album by The Dreamers
- Released: March 2010
- Recorded: January 2010
- Genre: Avant-garde, jazz, surf music
- Length: 54:26
- Label: Tzadik; 7380
- Producer: John Zorn

The Dreamers chronology
O'o (2009)	Ipos: Book of Angels Volume 14 (2010)	A Dreamers Christmas (2011)

Book of Angels chronology
Mycale: Book of Angels Volume 13 (2009)	Ipos: Book of Angels Volume 14 (2010)	Baal: Book of Angels Volume 15 (2010)

Ipos: Book of Angels Volume 14 is an album by the Dreamers performing compositions from John Zorn's second Masada book, The Book of Angels.

== Reception ==
Professional ratings
Review scores
Source	Rating
Free Jazz Collective	4/5 stars

Stereophile's Fred Kaplan stated "Ipos is an oddball in the Zorn oeuvre but instantly and thoroughly appealing. The album’s star is Ribot, strumming and twanging his guitar in a Hawaiian style that sounds more like the hip-retro rock of the Lounge Lizards (no coincidence, as Ribot once played in that group), alternating with quasi-minimalist tunes that, unlike much in the genre, is genuinely riveting. It’s a record that will keep you dancing in your head and on the floor". Mark Shikuma reviewed the album noting "Zorn has presented his most assessable "rock" record to date, providing an excellent head start on summer soundtracks. Ipos, as a result, is yet another impressive addition to the epic catalogue Zorn has amassed in a relatively short amount of time. With the "Masada" series, he has found a multitude of approaches in deconstructing Jewish folk songs, constantly bringing different formations together. Because of this, Zorn never seems to be simply re-treading old ideas". The Free Jazz Collective stated "The compositions are fresh, the melodies easy in the ear, the playing crisp... and the rhythms, well, the rhythms ... are magnificent as usual, putting you in all kinds of moods and inclinations to dance, despite the dark undertones of the music."

== Track listing ==
All compositions by John Zorn

1. "Tirtael" – 3:55
2. "Hashul" – 3:51
3. "Galizur" – 7:33
4. "Oriel" – 5:28
5. "Zavebe" – 4:40
6. "Qalbam" – 8:02
7. "Hagai" – 4:15
8. "Zortek" – 5:35
9. "Ezriel" – 7:26
10. "Kutiel" – 3:36

== Personnel ==
- Marc Ribot – guitar
- Jamie Saft – keyboards
- Kenny Wollesen – vibraphone
- Trevor Dunn – bass
- Joey Baron – drums
- Cyro Baptista – percussion
