= The Mysteries (album) =

Studio album by John Zorn
- Released: March 26, 2013
- Recorded: December 2012
- Genre: Avant-garde, Jazz, Contemporary classical music
- Length: 48:32
- Label: Tzadik TZ 8306
- Producer: John Zorn

John Zorn chronology
Lemma (2013)	The Mysteries (2013)	Tap: Book of Angels Volume 20 (2013)

The Gnostic Trio chronology
The Gnostic Preludes (2012)	The Mysteries (2013)	In Lambeth (2013)

The Mysteries is an album composed by John Zorn and performed by Bill Frisell, Carol Emanuel and Kenny Wollesen which was recorded in New York City in December 2012 and released on the Tzadik label in March 2013. The album is the second by the trio following 2012's The Gnostic Preludes.

== Reception ==
Professional ratings
Review scores
Source	Rating
Allmusic	4/5 stars
Free Jazz Collective	4.5/5 stars

Allmusic said "The Mysteries is another facet of this fine trio's persona as they elegantly yet inquisitively interpret these beautiful pieces by the composer. Their interplay is at such a high level, it feels nearly instinctive." Martin Schray stated "The Mysteries is a very exciting follow-up to The Gnostic Preludes, particularly in its details. And again it is pure joy listening to the outstanding interplay of these master musicians."

== Track listing ==
All compositions by John Zorn

1. "Sacred Oracle" – 5:35
2. "Hymn of the Naassenes" – 5:05
3. "Dance of Sappho" – 4:05
4. "The Bacchanalia" – 2:56
5. "Consolamentum" – 5:48
6. "Ode to the Cathars" – 6:55
7. "Apollo" – 3:27
8. "Yaldabaoth" – 3:54
9. "The Nymphs" – 10:47

== Personnel ==
- Carol Emanuel – harp
- Bill Frisell – guitar
- Kenny Wollesen – vibraphone, bells

=== Production ===
- Marc Urselli – engineer, audio mixer
- John Zorn and Kazunori Sugiyama – producers
