= Never Gonna Dance Again (disambiguation) =

Never Gonna Dance Again is a 2020 album by South Korean singer Taemin.

Never Gonna Dance Again may also refer to:

- "Never Gonna Dance Again", a song by Sugababes from the album Change

== See also ==
- The refrain of the 1984 George Michael single, "Careless Whisper"
- "Never Gonna Not Dance Again", 2022 song by Pink
