= The Director's Cut =

Studio album by Fantômas
- Released: July 9, 2001
- Genre: Avant-garde metal
- Length: 39:02
- Label: Ipecac
- Producer: Mike Patton

Fantômas chronology
Fantômas (1999)	The Director's Cut (2001)	Millennium Monsterwork 2000 (2002)

The Director's Cut is the second studio album by American experimental metal supergroup Fantômas. The album is a collection of cover versions of themes from horror films and television series, performed in a variety of different musical styles. It was released on July 9, 2001, through Ipecac Recordings, a record label co-owned by vocalist Mike Patton.

The Director's Cut has been praised by critics, with reviewers highlighting the album's versatility and unusual content; Patton in particular has been singled out for his performances. Since the album's release, Fantômas have performed it in its entirety at live shows in 2008 and 2014.

== Background and development ==
The Director's Cut was released on July 9, 2001, by Patton's record label, Ipecac Recordings. The album's release was presaged by a tour of Europe the preceding May and June, while the album version of "Rosemary's Baby"—the lullaby theme from the film of the same name—was previewed on the Ipecac Recordings website. The Director's Cut is an album of cover versions of the scores and soundtracks of horror films. The songs are not necessarily accurate or faithful to the original versions—for example, "The Godfather" is an adaptation of Nino Rota's stately theme from The Godfather, rendered in a thrash metal style with scat lyrics. The album, described as "genre breaking", blends together multiple genres, sometimes within a single song; it has been noted as demonstrating elements of thrash metal, abstract electronica, grunge, and jazz music. Fantômas performed the album in its entirety live at the London Astoria in 2008, and at the 2014 RockOut festival in Santiago, Chile.

== Critical reception ==
Professional ratings
Review scores
Source	Rating
AllMusic	4/5 stars
Drowned in Sound	9/10
Kerrang!	4/5 stars
Metal Storm	8/10
NME	8/10
Pitchfork	8.4/10
Tiny Mix Tapes	4/5 stars

The album has been met with favorable reviews from critics. Writing for AllMusic, Blake Butler rated the album four stars out of five. Butler described the album as "yet another testament to the unabashed genius of Mike Patton and his co-conspirators" and considered it to be a ground-breaking release. Drowned in Sound's Graham Reed awarded the album a score of nine out of ten, finding it to be "leftfield" but atmospheric. Reed praised the diversity shown by the group, ultimately calling it "one of the most challenging, and rewarding albums of the year". Noel Gardner of NME rated The Director's Cut eight out of ten, finding that it sounded better in practice than in theory. Gardner admitted that the covered themes were vastly different from their original presentations, but praised the drastic divergence as the album's strength. Pitchfork's Brendan Reid gave The Director's Cut a score of 8.4 out of 10. Reid described the album as "obsessively detailed and brutally frenetic", finding Patton's vocals to be the centre of the album's strength. Writing for CMJ New Music Monthly, Tom Mallon described the album as "inventive", finding that its varied approaches to the source material allowed the band members to "step out of [their] normal roles", particularly citing drummer Dave Lombardo's "jazzy" performance on "Experiment in Terror". Mallon felt that the album would not gain the group new admirers, but went "a long way toward cementing [Patton's] reputation as an artist rather than a mere noisemaker".

== Track listing ==
No.	Title	Writer(s)	Length
1.	"The Godfather"	Nino Rota	2:45
2.	"Der Golem"	Karl Ernst Sasse	2:38
3.	"Experiment in Terror"	Henry Mancini	2:40
4.	"One Step Beyond"	Harry Lubin	2:57
5.	"Night of the Hunter (Remix)"	Walter Schumann	0:58
6.	"Cape Fear"	Bernard Herrmann	1:49
7.	"Rosemary's Baby"	Krzysztof Komeda	3:20
8.	"The Devil Rides Out (Remix)"	James Bernard	1:37
9.	"Spider Baby"	Ronald Stein	2:25
10.	"The Omen (Ave Satani)"	Jerry Goldsmith	1:49
11.	"Henry: Portrait of a Serial Killer"	Robert McNaughton	3:07
12.	"Vendetta"	John Barry	2:03
13.	Untitled		0:05
14.	"Investigation of a Citizen Above Suspicion"	Ennio Morricone	4:00
15.	"Twin Peaks: Fire Walk with Me"	Angelo Badalamenti	3:28
16.	"Charade"	Mancini, Johnny Mercer	3:04
Total length:			39:02

== Personnel ==
- Mike Patton – vocals, keyboards, melodica, production, arrangement and artwork
- Dave Lombardo – drums
- Buzz Osborne – guitar
- Trevor Dunn – bass guitar
- S. Husky Höskul – engineering
- Magnum D. I. – engineering assistance
- Toji-Division – engineering assistance
- Desmond Shea – engineering assistance
- DJ Klinger and Radar – engineering assistance
- George Horn – mastering
- Martin Kvamme – artwork
- Kai Myhre – photography

== Charts ==
The Director's Cut spent two weeks in the Australian Album Chart, reaching a peak position of 18. It dropped to number 41 before leaving the chart entirely. In the United States, the album spent one week in the Billboard Independent Albums chart, at number 30.

Chart (2012–14)	Peak position
Australian Albums (ARIA)	18
US Independent Albums (Billboard)	30
