= Baal: Book of Angels Volume 15 =

Studio album by Ben Goldberg Quartet
- Released: April 20, 2010
- Recorded: September 12 & 13, 2009
- Genre: Avant-garde, jazz
- Length: 47:54
- Label: Tzadik; 7381
- Producer: John Zorn

Ben Goldberg chronology
Speech Communication (2009)	Baal: Book of Angels Volume 15 (2010)	Go Home (2010)

Book of Angels chronology
Ipos: Book of Angels Volume 14 (2010)	Baal: Book of Angels Volume 15 (2010)	Haborym: Book of Angels Volume 16 (2010)

Baal: Book of Angels Volume 15 is an album by the Ben Goldberg Quartet performing compositions from John Zorn's second Masada book, "The Book of Angels".

== Reception ==
Professional ratings
Review scores
Source	Rating
Free Jazz Collective	3.5/5 stars

Stef Gijssels stated "The music is familiar of course : Zorn's klezmer tunes full of jazzy harmonies and rhythms, but to the credit of the band, what they do with the material is a real pleasure as you might expect, sometimes driving the tunes into wilder territory, with especially Goldberg being really inspired in giving the music a more dramatic, somewhat theatrical edge, which fits well in the overall context of the series".

== Track listing ==
All compositions by John Zorn

1. "Chachmiel" - 7:20
2. "Asimor" - 4:26
3. "Irin" - 4:31
4. "Pharzuph" - 7:18
5. "Lahash" - 2:51
6. "Reqel" - 7:16
7. "'Ifafi" - 5:08
8. "Uzza" - 3:09
9. "Poteh" - 5:55

== Personnel ==
- Ben Goldberg - clarinet
- Jamie Saft - piano
- Greg Cohen - bass
- Kenny Wollesen - drums
