= O'o =

Studio album by John Zorn
- Released: July 28, 2009
- Recorded: February 8 & 9, 2009
- Genre: Jazz
- Length: 55:10
- Label: Tzadik
- Producer: John Zorn

The Dreamers chronology
The Dreamers (2008)	O'o (2009)	Ipos: Book of Angels Volume 14 (2010)

John Zorn chronology
Stolas: Book of Angels Volume 12 (2009)	O'o (2009)	Femina (2009)

O'o is an album by John Zorn released in 2009. It is the second album by The Dreamers following their 2008 release The Dreamers. The title refers to the ʻōʻō of the Hawaiian Islands, the last living members of the now-extinct songbird family Mohoidae. The song titles likewise refer extinct or nearly-so birds, from the prehistoric Archaeopteryx lithographica to the Zapata rail of which a few hundred survive in Cuba.

== Reception ==
The Allmusic review by Thom Jurek awarded the album 4 stars stating "O'o is every bit as accessible and fun to listen to as Dreamers is, but in many ways, it's even more satisfying because it feels like a work rather than a collection of tunes. In fact, the only thing more pleasing than listening to this album would be hearing it performed live."

Professional ratings
Review scores
Source	Rating
Allmusic	4/5 stars

== Track listing ==
All compositions by John Zorn.

1. "Miller's Crake" – 4:18
2. "Akialoa" – 4:46
3. "Po'o'uli" – 5:41
4. "Little Bittern" – 6:29
5. "Mysterious Starling" – 4:31
6. "Laughing Owl" – 4:44
7. "Archaeopteryx" – 5:06
8. "Solitaire" – 2:10
9. "Piopio" – 5:11
10. "The Zapata Rail" – 2:52
11. "Kakawahie" – 4:14
12. "Magdalena" – 5:07

== Personnel ==
- Marc Ribot – guitar
- Jamie Saft – piano, organ
- Kenny Wollesen – vibraphone
- Trevor Dunn – bass
- Joey Baron – drums
- Cyro Baptista – percussion
