= On Leaves of Grass =

Studio album by John Zorn
- Released: July 22, 2014
- Recorded: March 16 & 17, 2014 at East Side Sound, NYC
- Genre: Avant-garde; jazz; contemporary classical music
- Length: 48:16
- Label: Tzadik TZ 8320
- Producer: John Zorn

John Zorn chronology
Adramelech: Book of Angels Volume 22 (2014)	On Leaves of Grass (2014)	The Testament of Solomon (2014)

The Nova Quartet chronology
Dreamachines (2013)	On Leaves of Grass (2014)

On Leaves of Grass is an album composed by John Zorn inspired by the works of Walt Whitman and performed by the Nova Quartet, John Medeski, Kenny Wollesen, Trevor Dunn, and Joey Baron, which was recorded in New York City in March 2014 and released on the Tzadik label. The album is the fourth by the quartet following 2011's Nova Express and At the Gates of Paradise and 2013's Dreamachines.

== Reception ==
On The Quietus, Sean Kitching wrote "For anyone unaware of the gentler side of Zorn's music, as best represented by the album The Gift, or the four albums by his Dreamers project, the restraint and strength of melody showcased on this recording may come of something of a shock. The stellar level of musicianship displayed across Zorn's often genre-defying works, however, is always a given constant, and there are some breathtakingly beautiful moments here... Taken on its own merits, this is an accessible release that reveals surprising depths beneath its surface subtlety with repeated listening. Seen within the greater context of Zorn's overall canon, it further reinforces his position as one of the most diverse and prolific composers working today".

== Track listing ==
All compositions by John Zorn

1. "Whispers of Heavenly Death" – 5:35
2. "Song at Sunset" – 3:22
3. "Halcyon Days" – 4:26
4. "Portals" – 4:03
5. "Sea Drift" – 5:09
6. "Song of the Open Road" – 3:47
7. "The Body Electric" – 2:55
8. "Mystic Cyphers" – 4:30
9. "America" – 14:23

== Personnel ==
- John Medeski – piano
- Kenny Wollesen – vibraphone
- Trevor Dunn – bass
- Joey Baron – drums
- Ikue Mori – electronics (track 8)

=== Production ===
- Marc Urselli – engineer, audio mixer
- John Zorn and Kazunori Sugiyama – producers
