= Suspended Animation (Fantômas album) =

2005 studio album by Fantômas

Studio album by Fantômas
- Released: April 5, 2005
- Recorded: 2003
- Genre: Avant-garde metal; plunderphonics; grindcore
- Length: 43:46
- Label: Ipecac
- Producer: Mike Patton

Fantômas chronology
Delìrium Còrdia (2004)	Suspended Animation (2005)	Animali In Calore Surriscaldati Con Ipertermia Genitale/Cat in Red (2005)

Suspended Animation is the fourth studio album by American supergroup Fantômas. It is a concept album that incorporates a dual theme of cartoon sounds/music as well as paying tribute to obscure and dubious holidays throughout the month of April.

== Release ==
The limited edition disc is a spiral-bound April 2005 mini calendar featuring vivid imagery by Yoshitomo Nara and designed by Martin Kvamme. The disc sleeve is marked with "This calendar belongs to: .......... Your name". The album's limited edition was released on April 5, 2005, while the regular version was released on June 14, 2005.

== Reception ==
Professional ratings
Aggregate scores
Source	Rating
Metacritic	76/100
Review scores
Source	Rating
AllMusic	4.5/5 stars
Alternative Press	4/5 stars
Drowned in Sound	7/10
Rolling Stone	3/5 stars
Pitchfork	5.8/10
Playlouder	4/5 stars
PopMatters	8/10
Stylus	B
Tiny Mix Tapes	4.5/5 stars
Uncut	4/5 stars

Pitchfork wrote "the album still suffers from the same flaws that hampered Delirium Cordia. With the average track spanning less than 90 seconds, musical ideas either bleed from one song to the next or don't sustain themselves long enough to register in the listener's head."

== Track listing ==
1. "04/01/05 April Fool's Day" – 0:35
2. "04/02/05 International Children's Book Day (USA) Battle of the Flowers (France) National Peanut Butter and Jelly Day (USA)" – 2:10
3. "04/03/05 Megalisia (Roman) Don't Go to Work Unless It's Fun Day (USA)" – 1:46
4. "04/04/05 Er Tong Jie Children's Day (Taiwan) A Drop of Water Is a Grain of Gold Day (Turkmenistan)" – 1:33
5. "04/05/05 Festival of the Sweeping of the Tombs (China)" – 0:34
6. "04/06/05 Sorry Charlie Day (USA) Plan Your Epitaph Day (USA)" – 2:25
7. "04/07/05 Motherhood and Beauty Day (Armenia) No Housework Day (USA)" – 1:09
8. "04/08/05 Moharram (India) Hana Matsuri Flower Festival (Japan)" – 1:09
9. "04/09/05 Day of the Amazon Goddess (Brazil)" – 1:17
10. "04/10/05 Soul Sunday (Haitian Vodou) Feast of the Rivers and Seas (Egypt, Sumerian)" – 2:20
11. "04/11/05 Eight Track Tape Day (USA)" – 2:17
12. "04/12/05 Cosmonauts Day (Russia) Walk on Your Wild Side Day (USA) Feast of the Blajini (Romania)" – 1:16
13. "04/13/05 Blame Somebody Else Day (USA) Vaisakhi Solar Year (Hindu)" – 1:31
14. "04/14/05 Youth Day (Angola) International Moment of Laughter Day (USA)" – 2:21
15. "04/15/05 That Sucks' Day (USA) Day of the Sun (North Korea)" – 0:40
16. "04/16/05 Rekindle Your Romantic Self Day (USA)" – 0:49
17. "04/17/05 National Cheeseball Day (USA) "Blah Blah Blah" Day (USA)" – 0:46
18. "04/18/05 Week of the Young Child (USA) Depression Day -Anime Calendar (Japan)" – 0:47
19. "04/19/05 Binding Tuesday (UK) Garlic Day (USA)" – 0:40
20. "04/20/05 Taurus the Bull (Astrological Calendar) National Puppetry Day (USA)" – 1:49
21. "04/21/05 Kindergarten Day (Germany) Prophet's Birthday (Islamic)" – 1:40
22. "04/22/05 Feast of Ishtar (Babylonian) Girl Scout Leader Day (USA)" – 2:05
23. "04/23/05 Çocuk Bayrami (Turkey) Lover's Day (USA) Festival of the Green Man (Witches Calendar)" – 0:59
24. "04/24/05 National Karaoke Week (USA) Children's Day (Iceland)" – 1:49
25. "04/25/05 Cuckoo Day (UK) National Playground Safety Week (USA)" – 0:31
26. "04/26/05 Flower Parade (Netherlands) Richter Scale Day (USA)" – 1:32
27. "04/27/05 National Scoop the Poop Day (USA)" – 1:13
28. "04/28/05 Floralia (Romania)" – 1:31
29. "04/29/05 Casse Canarie (Haitian Vodou)" – 1:29
30. "04/30/05 National Honesty Day (USA) Beltane (Celtic) Walpurgisnacht (Germany)" – 3:09

== Chart performance ==
Chart	Peak
U.S. Top Heatseekers	7
U.S. Independent Albums	12
Swedish Album Chart	43
Australian Album Chart	49
French Album Chart	129
U.S. Billboard 200	158
