= Shir Hashirim (album) =

Studio album by John Zorn
- Released: December 3, 2013
- Recorded: September 2010 at East Side Sound, NYC
- Genre: Avant-garde, vocal music
- Length: 30:58
- Label: Tzadik TZ 8310
- Producer: John Zorn

John Zorn chronology
In Lambeth (2013)	Shir Hashirim (2013)	The Hermetic Organ Vol. 2 (2014)

Shir Hashirim is an album of vocal music by John Zorn, written in 2008, recorded in New York City in September 2010, and released on the Tzadik label in December 2013. The album features compositions inspired by the Song of Songs and cover art by Auguste Rodin.

== Track listing ==
All compositions by John Zorn

1. "Kiss Me" - 4:08
2. "Rose of Sharon" - 3:11
3. "At Night in My Bed" - 3:46
4. "How Beautiful You Are" - 3:07
5. "I Have Come Into My Garden" - 5:22
6. "Where Has Your Lover Gone" - 3:45
7. "Dance Again" - 3:36
8. "O, If You Were Only My Brother" - 4:07

== Personnel ==
The Sapphites:

- Abigail Fischer, Kathryn Mulvehill, Kirsten Sollek, Lisa Bielawa, Martha Cluver - voice

== Production ==
- Marc Urselli - engineer, audio mixer
- Scott Hull - mastering
- John Zorn and Kazunori Sugiyama – producers
