= The Gnostic Preludes =

Studio album by John Zorn
- Released: 13 March 2012
- Recorded: December 2011
- Genre: Avant-garde, experimental music
- Length: 47:58
- Label: Tzadik
- Producer: John Zorn

John Zorn chronology
Mount Analogue (2012)	The Gnostic Preludes (2012)	Pruflas: Book of Angels Volume 18 (2012)

The Gnostic Trio chronology
The Gnostic Preludes (2012)	The Mysteries (2013)

The Gnostic Preludes (subtitled Music of Splendor) is an album composed by John Zorn and released on the Tzadik label in March 2012. It was the first album by Carol Emanuel, Bill Frisell, and Kenny Wollesen who became known as The Gnostic Trio.

== Reception ==
Professional ratings
Review scores
Source	Rating
Allmusic	4/5 stars
All About Jazz	favorable
Free Jazz Collective	4.5/5 stars

Allmusic said "The Gnostic Preludes is poetic, deceptively simple, and spiritually vast in scope." All About Jazz stated "Gnostic Preludes is an intriguing and seductive recording, with a gentle and contemplative feeling that resonates with emotive power. It combines the feel of ambiance music with lyrical and melodic prowess seldom seen in Zorn's work. As such, it is a moving work well worth surrendering to." Martin Schray commented "Zorn draws his inspiration from philosophical sources as different as the ideas the Kabbalah, natural mysticism or – obviously in this case – Gnosticism, which might have been a reason to establish his series of 21st century mystical music. The Gnostic Preludes tries to integrate all these spiritual influences in a musical way."

== Track listing ==
All compositions by John Zorn

No.	Title	Length
1.	"Prelude 1: The Middle Pillar"	6:39
2.	"Prelude 2: The Book of Pleasure"	6:05
3.	"Prelude 3: Prelude of Light"	5:56
4.	"Prelude 4: Diatesseron"	4:35
5.	"Prelude 5: Music of the Spheres"	8:13
6.	"Prelude 6: Circumambulation"	6:33
7.	"Prelude 7: Sign and Sigil"	6:22
8.	"Prelude 8: The Invisibles"	3:35

== Personnel ==
- Carol Emanuel – harp
- Bill Frisell – guitar
- Kenny Wollesen – vibraphone, bells
