= Fantômas (band) =

American experimental metal supergroup

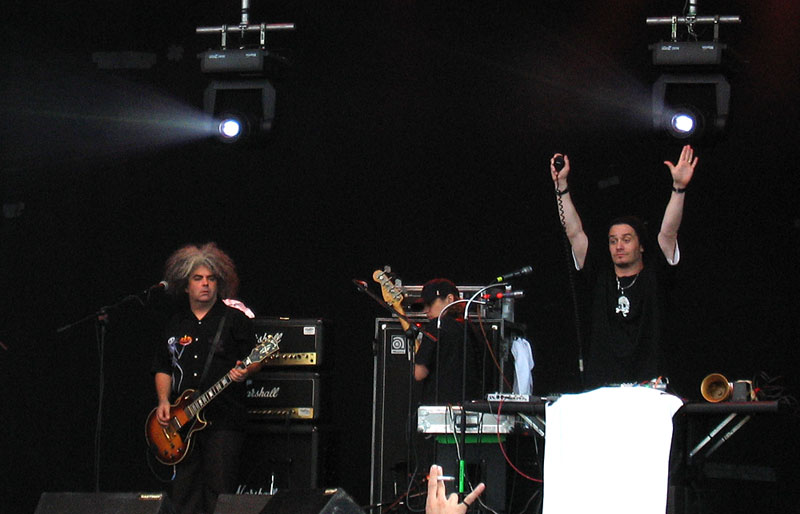
- Fantômas performing live

Background information
- Origin: California, U.S.
- Genres: Experimental metal; experimental rock; grindcore; alternative metal
- Years active: 1998–present
- Label: Ipecac
- Spinoffs: Dead Cross
- Spinoff of: Mr. Bungle
- Members: Mike Patton; Buzz Osborne; Trevor Dunn; Dave Lombardo
- Website: ipecac.com/artists/fantomas

Fantômas is an American experimental metal supergroup formed in 1998 in California. It features vocalist Mike Patton (Faith No More, Mr. Bungle), drummer Dave Lombardo (ex-Slayer), guitarist Buzz Osborne (Melvins) and bassist Trevor Dunn (Mr. Bungle, Tomahawk). The band is named after Fantômas, a supervillain featured in a series of crime novels popular in France before World War I and in film, most notably in the '60s French movie series.

== History ==
Fantômas began just before the collapse of Faith No More, as a series of spasmic songs composed by vocalist and bandleader Mike Patton. Patton then sent the demos to guitarist Buzz Osborne (of Melvins), bassist Trevor Dunn (of Mr. Bungle) and drummer Igor Cavalera (of Sepultura), with the intention of forming a supergroup. Cavalera declined the offer, but recommended who he thought would be perfect for the project: Dave Lombardo of Slayer, who accepted. The band have released all of their albums through Patton's independent label Ipecac, however there was initially interest from several prominent record labels, primarily due to Patton's commercial success with Faith No More. He recalled "There was a whole lot of interest, at first. People from Geffen and stuff like this came out to the shows. But after the show, they disappeared into the woodwork. There were [also] indies that were interested, but none that I was interested in."

In mid-2005, the band toured Europe with Terry Bozzio on drums, as Lombardo was on tour with Slayer. Lombardo returned to the band for the final dates of the tour, which concluded on September 15, 2005.

On May 13, 2006, Patton revealed to Billboard's official website that a fifth Fantômas album was being planned. Of the album, Patton says, "The next record is going to be an all-electronic affair. It's going to take some creative planning on how to record it and execute it, but there will be no acoustic instruments on it whatsoever. We're pretty much about to go into hibernation mode. I need to, once I have a little time, go back to the drawing board and start writing the next one." In November 2008, Rock-A-Rolla, a UK-based alternative music magazine, exclusively revealed on their website that the new album was currently being worked on and a tentative June 2009 release was possible, however, in the May 2009 issue of Rock-A-Rolla, in an interview with Greg Werckman, Werckman stated that Mike "hasn't even begun" recording the next Fantômas record.

On July 21, 2011, Rock-A-Rolla revealed that Fantômas would be releasing their December 31, 2008, performance at San Francisco's Great American Music Hall as a DVD and a standalone audio download, titled The Director's Cut Live: A New Year's Revolution. On September 16, 2014, Ipecac Recordings announced that on Record Store Day they would be releasing a boxset titled "Wunderkammer," which would contain all of the Fantômas albums on vinyl as well as a cassette featuring Mike Patton's original demos for the band.

In December 2014, Fantômas played their first shows in six years as part of the Rockout Festival in Santiago, Chile, however no plans have been announced to date regarding a new studio recording.

On June 24, 2017, Fantômas reunited to open for Tool's concert in San Bernardino, California. Due to his touring commitments with Suicidal Tendencies, Dave Lombardo could not perform at the show. Melvins' Dale Crover returned to take Lombardo's place for the performance.

== Musical style and influences ==
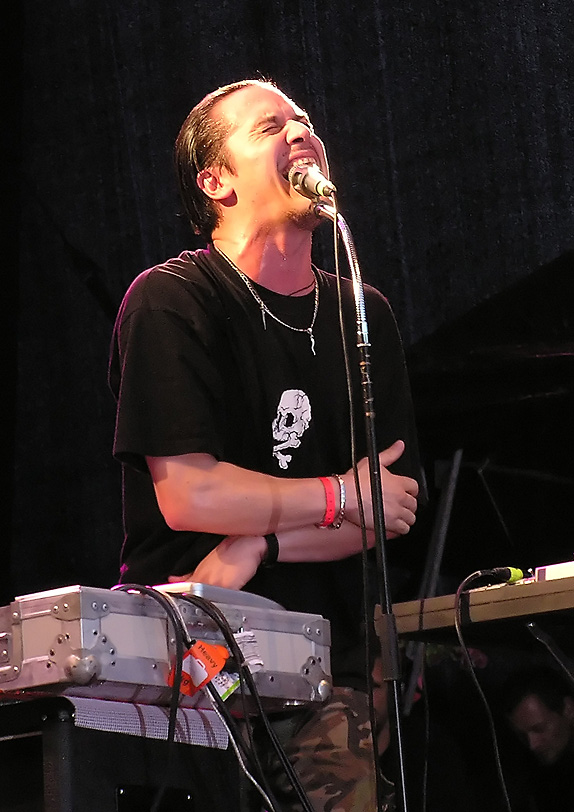
Patton performing with Fantômas at Quart Festival, Norway on July 9, 2005

Fantômas' musical style has mostly been described as experimental/avant-garde metal. Their sound has also been labeled as experimental rock, grindcore, alternative metal, and noise rock.

The band arrange albums around concepts or themes:

- Fantômas is based on science fiction comic books, with every song simply given a page number ("Page 1", "Page 2", etc.). The artwork was mainly taken from the Italian comic Diabolik.
- The Director's Cut is a series of reinterpretations of motion picture theme songs. Some versions are rather loyal to the sources (such as the eerie lullabye from The Night of the Hunter), while others offer radical takes on the music (such as the theme from The Godfather).
- Delìrium Còrdia is one extended song, with the concept of surgery without anesthesia.
- Suspended Animation is an album of twisted cartoon music, each track named after a day in the month of April 2005, and the limited-edition, first pressing of the album was itself (literally) a calendar of the month featuring the art of contemporary Japanese pop artist Yoshitomo Nara.

== Legacy ==
American rock band Tool cited Fantômas as a major influence on their 2006 record 10,000 Days. In 2006, Mastodon cited several experimental bands, among them Fantômas, as an inspiration to expand their sound into new directions. Dan Briggs, bassist for Between the Buried and Me, called it "a big part of [his] musical background" and considers the Wunderkammer box set one of his most valuable records.

American heavy metal band Slipknot was heavily influenced by Fantômas in its beginning. The whole band, who was already a fan of Mike Patton, attended one of their first shows in 1998 before Fantômas released any music and were astounded by their technical prowess, calling them the tightest band they had seen. Its drummer Joey Jordison said that the work of Dave Lombardo on Fantômas should be known by every drummer. Mushroomhead frontman Jason Popson called it his favorite band in 2000.

Other bands influenced by Fantômas are CKY, The Locust, and Car Bomb. Known fans of it included actor Danny DeVito, writer Alan Moore, and dance music artist Moby.

== Band members ==
Current

- Mike Patton – vocals, synthesizers, keyboards, melodica, sampling
- Buzz Osborne – guitar, vocals
- Trevor Dunn – bass, backing vocals
- Dave Lombardo – drums, percussion

Touring

- Terry Bozzio – drums, percussion
- Dale Crover – drums, percussion, backing vocals

== Discography ==
=== Studio albums ===
Year	Album details	Peak chart positions					
Year	Album details	US	US Heat.	US Ind.	AUS	FRA	SWE
1999	Fantômas: Released: April 27, 1999; Label: Ipecac; Formats: CD, DI	—	—	—	—	—	—
2001	The Director's Cut: Released: July 10, 2001; Label: Ipecac; Formats: CD, DI	—	—	30	18	—	—
2004	Delìrium Còrdia: Released: January 27, 2004; Label: Ipecac; Formats: CD, DI	183	7	7	54	118	—
2005	Suspended Animation: Released: April 5, 2005; Label: Ipecac; Formats: CD, DI	158	7	7	49	118	—

=== Live albums ===
Year	Album details	Peak chart positions	
Year	Album details	US Heat.	US Ind.
2002	Millennium Monsterwork 2000 (as The Fantômas/Melvins Big Band): Released: April 1, 2002; Label: Ipecac; Formats: CD, DI	45	21
2011	The Director's Cut Live: A New Year's Revolution: Released: September 6, 2011; Label: Ipecac; Formats: DI	—	—

=== Split releases ===
Year	Album details
2005	Animali in Calore Surriscaldati con Ipertermia Genitale/Cat in Red (with Melt-Banana): Released: August 2005; Label: Unhip; Formats: CD, LP
2013	Sugar Daddy Live Split Series Vol. 10 (with Melvins): Released: December 31, 2013; Label: Amphetamine Reptile Records; Formats: LP

=== Video albums ===
Year	Album details
2008	Live from London 2006 (as The Fantômas/Melvins Big Band): Released: August 26, 2008; Label: Ipecac; Formats: DVD
2011	The Director's Cut Live: A New Year's Revolution: Released: September 6, 2011; Label: Ipecac; Formats: DVD; Video by Vince Forcier; Audio by Vinny Palese

=== Compilation albums ===
Year	Album details
2014	Wunderkammer: Released: December 16, 2014; Label: Ipecac Recordings; Formats: LP x 5, cassette x 1

== See also ==
- List of ambient music artists
