= Miller Theatre =

Performance venue at Columbia University

Kathryn Bache Miller Theatre
- McMillin Theater
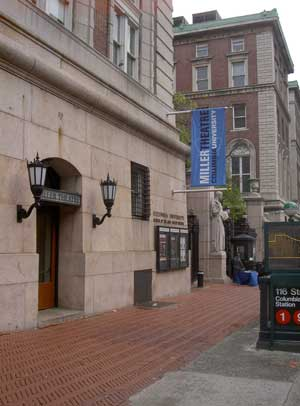
- Interactive map of Kathryn Bache Miller Theatre
- Address: 2960 Broadway; New York City; United States
- Coordinates: 40°48′28.7″N 73°57′47.6″W
- Owner: Columbia University School of the Arts
- Capacity: 688
- Current use: Performing arts venue

Construction
- Opened: 1919
- Reopened: 1988

Website
- www.millertheatre.com

Miller Theatre at Columbia University is located on the Morningside Heights campus of Columbia University. It is a performing arts producer dedicated to developing and presenting new music.

Originally named the McMillin Theater, it was renovated and renamed the Kathryn Bache Miller Theatre in 1988, with George Steel as its first executive director. The current director, Melissa Smey, took over from Steel in 2009.

Miller Theatre is particularly known for its Composer Portraits Series. Each concert in the series focuses on the work of a single composer.
