= Filmworks Anthology: 20 Years of Soundtrack Music =

Compilation album by John Zorn
- Released: August 23, 2005
- Recorded: 1995–2005
- Genre: Avant-garde, jazz, classical
- Length: 75:52
- Label: Tzadik TZ 7350
- Producer: John Zorn

Filmworks chronology
Filmworks XVI: Workingman's Death (2005)	Filmworks Anthology: 20 Years of Soundtrack Music (2005)	Filmworks XVII: Notes on Marie Menken/Ray Bandar: A Life with Skulls (2006)

John Zorn chronology
50th Birthday Celebration Volume 12 (2005)	Filmworks Anthology (2005)	Azazel: Book of Angels Volume 2 (2005)

Filmworks Anthology: 20 Years of Soundtrack Music is a compilation album featuring selections from the first fifteen Filmworks albums by John Zorn and one previously unreleased track which was issued on the Tzadik label in 2005.

== Reception ==
Professional ratings
Review scores
Source	Rating
Allmusic	4/5 stars

The Allmusic review by Thom Jurek awarded the album 4 stars stating "For those intimidated by the sheer number of volumes comprising Zorn's Film Works series (18 as of October 2006), this is a great place to start. The full range of Zorn's moods, colors, textures, and, of course, humor comes across in these cues".

== Track listing ==
All compositions by John Zorn

1. "Main Title: She Must Be Seeing Things" - 1:05 from Filmworks 1986–1990
2. "End Titles: White and Lazy" - 2:00 from Filmworks 1986–1990
3. "Yakisoba" - 1:17 from Filmworks VII: Cynical Hysterie Hour
4. "Punk Rock Hero" - 0:57 from Filmworks VII: Cynical Hysterie Hour
5. "Through the Night" - 1:31 from Filmworks VII: Cynical Hysterie Hour
6. "Surfing Samba" - 1:11 from Filmworks VII: Cynical Hysterie Hour
7. "Fanfare/Theme: The Golden Boat" - 3:30 from Filmworks 1986–1990
8. "France: Weiden and Kennedy Nike Spot" - 0:16 from Filmworks III: 1990–1995
9. "Sweden: Weiden and Kennedy Nike Spot" - 0:30 from Filmworks III: 1990–1995
10. "Arsenal Dance Mix" - 3:59 from Filmworks II: Music for an Untitled Film by Walter Hill
11. "Main Title: Hollywood Hotel" - 1:36 from Filmworks III: 1990–1995
12. "Wheelchair Racers: Weiden and Kennedy Commercial Spot" - 0:43 from Filmworks III: 1990–1995
13. "Pueblo" - 9:01 from Filmworks IV: S&M + More
14. "Lituus" - 1:06 from Filmworks V: Tears of Ecstasy
15. "Fireworks" - 1:53 from Filmworks VI: 1996
16. "End Titles: Anton, Mailman" - 3:09 from Filmworks VI: 1996
17. "Deseo" - 2:28 from Filmworks VIII: 1997
18. "Shanghai" - 2:38 from Filmworks VIII: 1997
19. "Trembling Before G-d" - 2:26 from Filmworks IX: Trembling Before G-d
20. "Filming" - 5:51 from Filmworks X: In the Mirror of Maya Deren
21. "Sabbos Noir" - 2:09 from Filmworks XI: Secret Lives
22. "Chippy Charm" - 1:36 from Filmworks XII: Three Documentaries
23. "Vocal Phase" - 3:53 from Filmworks XII: Three Documentaries
24. "Shaolin Spirit" - 3:02 from Filmworks XII: Three Documentaries
25. "Main Title: Invitation to a Suicide" - 4:38 from Filmworks XIII: Invitation to a Suicide
26. "Sekhel (vocal version)" - 4:57 from Filmworks XIV: Hiding and Seeking
27. "Protocols of Zion" - 4:29 from Filmworks XV: Protocols of Zion
28. "Indonesia" - 4:01 previously unreleased
