= Matt Darriau =

Matt Darriau (born in Bloomington, Indiana), is a Balkan, klezmer, Celtic and jazz musician. His most notable work is with Balkan rhythm quartet Paradox Trio, The Klezmatics, and Orange Then Blue.

Other musical projects include Ballin' the Jack, Yo Lateef, Disastro Totale (with Yuri Lemeshev), Whirligig, Celtic Eclectic, CCXMD (with Cinema Cinema), and Shabbes Elevator.

Darriau grew up listening to Balkan, Israeli, and other styles of world music. He moved to Boston to study at the New England Conservatory of Music in the third stream program. He now resides in New York City.

== Discography ==
- 1995 Matt Darriau's Paradox Trio (Knitting Factory)
- 1997 Flying at a Slant (Knitting Factory)
- 2009 Liquid Clarinets (Felmay)
- 2010 Matt Darriau Paradox Trio With Bojan Z. (Felmay)

With The Klezmatics

- 1995 Jews with Horns (Flying Fish)
- 1997 Possessed (Xenophile)
- 1998 The Well with Chava Alberstein (Xenophile)
- 2002 Rise Up! Shteyt Oyf! (Rounder)
- 2004 Brother Moses Smote the Water, with Joshua Nelson & Kathryn Farmer (Piranha)
- 2006 Wonder Wheel (JMG)
- 2006 Woody Guthrie's Happy Joyous Hanukkah (JMG)
- 2008 Tuml = Lebn: The Best of the First 20 Years (Piranha)
- 2011 Live at Town Hall (Klezmatics Disc)

With Paradox Trio

- 1995 Matt Darriau Paradox Trio (Knitting Factory)
- 1997 Flying at a Slant (Knitting Factory)
- 1999 Source (Knitting Factory)
- 2005 Gambit with Theodosii Spassov (Enja)
- 2010 With Bojan Z (Felmay)

With Ballin' the Jack

- 1999 Jungle (Knitting Factory)
- 2001 The Big Head (Knitting Factory)

With Jon Madof's Zion80

- Zion80 (Tzadik, 2013)
- Adramelech: Book of Angels Volume 22 (Tzadik, 2014)

With Cinema Cinema

- Man Bites Dog (Labelship, 2017)
- CCXMD (Nefarious Industries, 2019)
- CCXMDII (Nefarious Industries, 2021)
