= The Treatment (2006 film) =

- Directed by: Oren Rudavsky
- Written by: Daniel Saul Housman, based on a novel by Daniel Menaker
- Produced by: Oren Rudavsky, Jonathan Shoemaker
- Starring: Chris Eigeman; Famke Janssen; Harris Yulin; Stephanie March; Ian Holm
- Cinematography: Andrij Parekh
- Music by: John Zorn
- Distributed by: Cinema Management Group
- Release date: 2006
- Country: United States
- Language: English

The Treatment is an American romantic comedy film released in 2006 produced and directed by Oren Rudavsky and starring Chris Eigeman and Famke Janssen.

It is based on a novel with the same title by Daniel Menaker.

== Plot ==
New York private Coventry school English teacher Jake Singer tries rekindling a relationship, but Julia invites him to her engagement "going-away" party, asking, "are you seeing anybody? ...I mean therapy."

Psychoanalyst Dr. Ernesto Morales criticizes Jake's "apologizing" with "constructing passive sentences" such as "I suppose, maybe, I guess." Jake resists discussing "manners" and his dead mother, wanting to discuss his "almost non-existent sex life," after a year without Julia. Morales shrugs, Jake can stop "the treatment" or continue "this disputatious resistance." Jake admits anger that Julia's "gone for good."

Ted, Scott and Phil question Checkov's writing. Jake challenges, literature hasn't been made "irrelevant by modern pharmacology," advising not to "process literature" to "solve equations," and asking Chris to define humanism. Jake greets Allegra Marshall and her eight year-old adopted son Alex. After "exchanging some potent ideas about education," headmaster Leighton Proctor invites Jake to Allegra's benefactors' luncheon.

Galgano coaches Walter Cooper to step up his basketball game. Singer advises "ease-up," but Galgano rebukes, "stick to the stats." Walter injures a player, causing Jake to argue with faculty colleague Bill Daniels, while Patty Mcpherson supports him; Proctor wants "fewer contradictions." Jake takes these new frustrations to Morales.

Nervously mixing a screwdriver, Jake's colleague Gerry Leonard warns against "Yankee firewater" before speaking at Allegra's upper-crust gathering. Allegra tries making Jake "feel more comfortable," but Jake's subconscious mind hallucinates Morales. Gerry reveals Allegra's wealthy husband George died from a massive cardiac embolism. Jake expresses new concerns to Morales.

The school nurse, dealing with four sick children, allows Jake to take Alex home. Concerned he can't give Allegra anything she doesn't already have, she encourages, "try using your imagination." Morales tries helping Jake obtain intimacy, advising time, patience, clearing away "denial, repression, fear," to face issues directly, to be "capable of love, wisdom...satisfaction of work, wealth, and sex. But...don't stop the treatment."

Meeting Julia's "ex" Steve and fiancé Andre, Jake reminisces about their "changing the world" teaching kids in Brazil, toasting, "cheers to your new life together."

Galgano berates Walter for losing a game, and swears at Jake; Walter throws a chair at Galgano, striking Jake instead. After stitches, Jake and Allegra become intimate. She reveals, George died before baby Emily's "two-parent family" adoption was finalized; she's dodged her "final home check-up." Jake expresses new doubts to Morales – Allegra's vulnerability, his lack of wealth – Morales' cynicism angers Jake. Morales suggests a romantic Valentine's Day gift, "Court the widow." Jake hallucinates Morales again during sex, and they're interrupted by Alex wanting devil dogs, and Allegra's mother-in-law Claire visiting.

Wanting biological grandchildren, Jake's father, retired surgeon Arnold Singer asks Allegra directly if that's "an option with you?"

Assuming Jake is Allegra's husband, Allegra's new maid causes a "mix-up" with the adoption agency's caseworker, Ms. Callucci, forcing Jake to "react" and lie rather than "think" to correct her. Morales "appears" again, "A lie is a failure to understand oneself." Jake tells Callucci the truth, jeopardizing Emily's adoption, and their relationship.

Morales argues, "ill-advised emotional involvement" brought more pain, not a "clean break." Jake calls Morales "worse than my father...maybe it's us who should make a clean break." Morales' ultimatum, "walk out," and "our work is over." Jake leaves. Arnold gives his wife's wedding ring to Jake, who says "You're my only doctor now, Dad." Arnold advises, "trust your instincts...Don't give up." Jake tells Callucci he intends to marry Allegra and be Emily's father, asking for another chance. But Allegra's not ready to have another husband.

Overhearing Jake's students discussing Albert Camus' novella L'Étranger before the "existential dilemma" of summer break, Allegra apologizes for blaming Jake, and thanks him for talking to Callucci; "Emily can stay." But he's leaving for a London semester, explaining he "held on to someone else for too long." She reasons, "That's what love is....seeing your husband die...or getting your heart broken and being brave enough to try again....take me home, please?"

To the last of the great Freudians J.R.G.
And to the memory of Peter Hutcheson.

— Closing dedication

Jake gets ready to propose. Gabriel "appears," dissuading against "this mistake," declaring himself, "the last great Freudian." Jake's determined, "I'm getting married, and you're not invited," pushing Gabriel, "back in the closet." Allegra wonders, "What's in the closet...a ghost?" Jake doesn't believe in ghosts, but nevertheless glances at the door creaking open.

== Cast ==
- Chris Eigeman as Jake Singer
- Ian Holm as Dr. Ernesto Morales, Jake's psychoanalyst
- Famke Janssen as Allegra Marshall
- Blair Brown as Ms. Callucci, an adoption agency caseworker
- Elizabeth Hubbard as Claire Marshall, Allegra's mother-in-law
- Stephen Lang as Coach Galgano, Jake's basketball colleague
- Stephanie March as Julia, Jake's ex
- Roger Rees as Leighton Proctor, the Coventry school's headmaster
- Harris Yulin as Arnold Singer, Jake's father
- Peter Vack as Ted, Jake's student
- Griffin Newman as Scott, Jake's student
- Maddie Corman as Patty Mcpherson, a Coventry school teacher
- Peter Hermann as Steve, Julia's ex
- Paul Sparks as Andre, Julia's fiancé
- Marceline Hugot as Upstate Nurse

== Awards ==
The Treatment won in the category of Best New York Narrative at the 2006 Tribeca Film Festival.

John Zorn who composed the score for the film won a MacArthur Foundation, the "Genius" award for his music in 2006. The album, titled Filmworks XVIII: The Treatment features a full score for film by John Zorn. The album was released on Zorn's own label, Tzadik Records.
