= The Gathering (Rashanim album) =

Studio album by Jon Madof's Rashanim
- Released: July 28, 2009
- Recorded: March 24, 2009 at EastSide Sound, NYC
- Genre: Jazz; klezmer; rock
- Length: 47:47
- Label: Tzadik TZ 8144

Jon Madof chronology
Shalosh (2006)	The Gathering (2009)	Zion80 (2013)

The Gathering is the fourth album by guitarist Jon Madof's Rashanim trio featuring Shanir Ezra Blumenkranz and Mathias Kunzli which was released in 2009 on John Zorn's Tzadik Records as part of the Radical Jewish Culture Series.

== Reception ==
Professional ratings
Review scores
Source	Rating
All About Jazz	4.5/5 stars
PopMatters	9/10 stars

All About Jazz reviewer Warren Allen said "The band has crafted an album full of beautifully deployed sounds, particularly on a series of brief musical vignettes that feature delicate little melodies teased out on eclectic instruments such as glockenspiel and melodica. It makes for an eclectic listening experience that should appeal to any lover of creative music and melody". PopMatters' writer Sean Murphy stated "Rashanim’s The Gathering is cause for joy bordering on disbelief. This, truly, is as good as contemporary music is capable of being, and the latest release is their best work yet."

== Track listing ==
All compositions by Jon Madof

1. "Judges" - 3:28
2. "Kings" - 5:43
3. "Ezekiel" - 3:50
4. "David" - 4:35
5. "Elijah's Cup" - 1:55
6. "Deborah" - 6:28
7. "Elijah's Chair" - 3:19
8. "Amos" - 5:01
9. "Micah" - 1:37
10. "Elijah's Chariot" - 1:56
11. "Jeremiah" - 4:27
12. "Joshua" - 5:28

== Personnel ==
- Jon Madof – guitars, banjo, vocals
- Shanir Ezra Blumenkranz – acoustic bass guitar, bass banjo, glockenspiel, melodica, tiple, chonguri, vocals
- Matthias Künzli – drums, percussion, jaw harp, whistling, vocals
