= Shalosh =

Studio album by Jon Madof's Rashanim
- Released: October 17, 2006
- Recorded: July 10 & 11, 2006
- Genre: Jazz; klezmer; rock
- Length: 51:39
- Label: Tzadik

Jon Madof chronology
Masada Rock (2005)	Shalosh (2006)	The Gathering (2009)

Shalosh is the third album by guitarist Jon Madof's Rashanim trio, with Shanir Ezra Blumenkranz on bass guitar and Mathias Kunzli on drums. The album was released in 2006 by Tzadik as part of the Radical Jewish Culture Series.

== Reception ==
Professional ratings
Review scores
Source	Rating
All About Jazz	4.5/5 stars
AllMusic	4/5 stars

All About Jazz reviewer Troy Collins said "Rashanim veers far and wide, covering a range of styles and moods. One of the year's most entertaining releases, rich with memorable melodies and haunting themes, Shalosh is not to be missed." AllMusic rated the album 4 stars out of 5.

== Track listing ==
All compositions by Jon Madof

1. "Ein Gedi" - 4:31
2. "Yosefa" - 5:33
3. "Atbash" - 4:52
4. "Da'at" - 5:27
5. "Cracow Niggun" - 5:49
6. "Kavanah" - 5:46
7. "Jacob and Esau" - 2:24
8. "Jerusalem" - 5:11
9. "Ur Ur Lauter Georg" - 7:43
10. "Ar Aare" - 4:23

== Personnel ==
- Jon Madof – guitar
- Shanir Ezra Blumenkranz – double bass, electric bass, oud, gimbri
- Matthias Künzli – drums, percussion
