= Rashanim =

Studio album by Jon Madof
- Released: April 22, 2003
- Recorded: December 16, 2002 at Orange Music, NJ
- Genres: Jazz, klezmer, rock
- Length: 51:22
- Label: Tzadik TZ 7178
- Producer: Jon Madof

Jon Madof chronology
Rashanim (2003)	Masada Rock (2005)

Rashanim is the debut album by guitarist Jon Madof's Rashanim trio with Shanir Ezra Blumenkranz on bass and Mathias Kunzli on drums released in 2003 on John Zorn's Tzadik Records as part of the Radical Jewish Culture Series.

== Reception ==
Professional ratings
Review scores
Source	Rating
Allmusic	4/5 stars

JazzTimes reviewer Aaron Steinberg said, "Most of the tunes are Madof originals, though with several traditional Klezmer and folk melodies mixed in. They all keep dancing, occasionally dark melodies in common, which Madof handles confidently." He further commented on the pairing of Madof with bassist Shanir Ezra Blumenkranz, saying "[Blumenkranz's] active lines sometimes make a bid for harmolodic balance. The two work so well together, they sometimes leave drummer Mathias Kunzli with little to do". Allmusic rated the album with 4 stars.

== Track listing ==
All compositions by Jon Madof except as indicated

1. "Der Khusid Geyt Tantsn" (Traditional) – 3:07
2. "Chroma" – 5:18
3. "Meshek" – 6:56
4. "Dovid Melech Yisrael/Lecha Dodi" (Shlomo Carlebach) – 5:24
5. "Chanshe's Nign" – 5:05
6. "Fel Shara/Üsküdar" (Traditional) – 4:39
7. "Dybbuk" – 4:49
8. "Brooklyn Dance" – 3:29
9. "Passing" – 3:51
10. "V'shamru" (Moshe Rothblum) – 6:23
11. "Kamancha" (Sayat Nova) – 2:21

== Personnel ==
- Jon Madof – guitar
- Shanir Ezra Blumenkranz – electric bass
- Matthias Künzli – drums, percussion
