= Masada Rock =

Masada Anniversary Edition Vol. 5: Masada Rock

Studio album by John Zorn
- Released: July 26, 2005
- Recorded: April 4–6, 2005
- Genre: Jazz; klezmer; rock
- Length: 47:54
- Label: Tzadik
- Producer: John Zorn

John Zorn chronology
Astaroth: Book of Angels Volume 1 (2005)	Masada Anniversary Edition Vol. 5: Masada Rock (2005)	50th Birthday Celebration Volume 11 (2005)

Rashanim chronology
Rashanim (2003)	Masada Rock (2005)	Shalosh (2006)

Masada Anniversary Edition Vol. 5: Masada Rock is the fifth and final album in a series of five releases celebrating the 10th anniversary of John Zorn's Masada songbook project. It features 10 Masada songs performed by Jon Madof's Rashanim trio with Shanir Ezra Blumenkranz on bass and Mathias Kunzli on drums in addition to Madof's guitar with guest appearances from Marc Ribot on two tracks. It was released in 2005 on Zorn's Tzadik Records as part of the Radical Jewish Culture Series.

== Reception ==
Allmusic music critic Sean Westergaard wrote "The tunes range stylistically from some sort of ethnic surf music to punk jazz to beautiful acoustic pieces... A wide ranging program to be sure, but very well done." On All About Jazz Kurt Gottschalk observed "Madof is a valuable new gun-for-hire in town and he proves himself here to be both a delicate and a hard-rocking player. If at times his blister is a little over the top (as on "Chorek and "Zemanim ), the mad swerves between head-solo-head and head-headbang-head are not so far removed from Zorn's cut-and-paste projects of the '80s."

Professional ratings
Review scores
Source	Rating
Allmusic	4/5 stars

== Track listing ==
1. "Bahir" – 4:10
2. "Makom" – 5:21
3. "Zidon" – 4:39
4. "Shadrakh" – 4:57
5. "Chorek" – 4:58
6. "Anakim" – 5:15
7. "Zemanim" – 3:45
8. "Ahavah" – 3:26
9. "Arad" – 3:02
10. "Terumah" – 8:27

All compositions by John Zorn.

== Personnel ==
- Shanir Ezra Blumenkranz – electric bass, oud
- Jon Madof – guitar
- Matthias Künzli – drums, percussion
- Marc Ribot – guitar on tracks 1 and 4
