= Shanir Ezra Blumenkranz =

American bassist and oud player

Shanir Ezra Blumenkranz (born 1975) is an American bassist and oud player who has recorded and performed extensively with Cyro Baptista's Banquet of the Spirits, Daniel Zamir's Satlah, Rashanim, Pharaoh's Daughter, and John Zorn. Blumenkranz studied at the Manhattan School of Music, the Rimon School of Music in Israel, and holds a Bachelor of Music in Performance from Berklee College of Music in Boston. In 2012 he released the first album under his leadership Abraxas: Book of Angels Volume 19 featuring compositions by John Zorn. Blumenkranz was born in Brooklyn, New York, United States.

== Discography ==
=== As leader ===
- Abraxas: Book of Angels Volume 19 (Tzadik, 2013)
- Psychomagia (Tzadik, 2014) with Abraxas

=== With others ===
With Aram Bajakian

- Aram Bajakian's Kef (Tzadik, 2011)

With Cyro Baptista's Banquet of the Spirits

- Banquet of the Spirits (Tzadik, 2008)
- Infinito (Tzadik, 2009)
- Caym: Book of Angels Volume 17 (Tzadik, 2011)

With Christina Courtin

- Christina Courtin (Nonesuch, 2009)

With Eyal Maoz

- Peasant Songs (Piadrum, 2002) - with Lemon Juice Quartet
- Hope and Destruction (Tzadik, 2009)

With Ravish Momin's Trio Tarana

- Climbing the Banyan Tree (Cleanfeed, 2005)

With Jon Madof

- Rashanim (Tzadik, 2003)
- Masada Rock (Tzadik, 2005) as Rashanim
- Shalosh (Tzadik, 2006) as Rashanim
- The Gathering (Tzadik, 2009) as Rashanim
- Zion80 (Tzadik, 2013)
- Adramelech: Book of Angels Volume 22 (Tzadik, 2014)

With Sean Noonan's Brewed by Noon

- Set the Hammer Free (2010)

With Pharaoh's Daughter

- Haran (OY, 2007)

With Pitom

- Blasphemy and Other Serious Crimes (Tzadik, 2011)

With Jamie Saft

- A Bag of Shells (Tzadik, 2010)

With Basya Schechter

- Queen's Dominion (Tzadik, 2004)
- Songs of Wonder (Tzadik, 2011)

With Daniel Zamir's Satlah

- Satlah (Tzadik, 2000)
- Exodus (Tzadik, 2001)
- Children of Israel (Tzadik, 2002)

With John Zorn

- Voices in the Wilderness (Tzadik, 2003)
- The Unknown Masada (Tzadik, 2003)
- Filmworks XV: Protocols of Zion (Tzadik, 2005)
- Filmworks XVI: Workingman's Death (Tzadik, 2005)
- Filmworks XVII: Notes on Marie Menken/Ray Bandar: A Life with Skulls (Tzadik, 2006)
- Filmworks XVIII: The Treatment (Tzadik, 2006)
- Filmworks XXI: Belle de Nature/The New Rijksmuseum (Tzadik, 2008)
- In Search of the Miraculous (Tzadik, 2010)
- Mount Analogue (Tzadik, 2012)

With dálava

- dálava (dalavamusic.com, 2014)
