= Pruflas: Book of Angels Volume 18 =

Studio album by David Krakauer
- Released: March 2012
- Recorded: 2011
- Genre: Avant-garde, jazz, contemporary classical music
- Length: 46:35
- Label: Tzadik TZ 7396
- Producer: John Zorn

David Krakauer chronology
Bubbemeises: Lies My Gramma Told Me (2005)	Pruflas: Book of Angels Volume 18 (2012)

Book of Angels chronology
Caym: Book of Angels Volume 17 (2011)	Pruflas: Book of Angels Volume 18 (2012)	Abraxas: Book of Angels Volume 19 (2012)

Pruflas: Book of Angels Volume 18 is an album by clarinetist David Krakauer performing compositions from John Zorn's second Masada book, "The Book of Angels".

== Reception ==
Professional ratings
Review scores
Source	Rating
Free Jazz Collective	4/5 stars

Denti Alligator stated "Krakauer is of course a veteran klezmer musician who has led and contributed to an impressive array of recordings in both more traditional settings and various crossover projects. In this group he succeeds in melding klezmer with a little funk, some rock, and a tad bit of electronic music. The result is, mostly, exhilarating".

== Track listing ==
All compositions by John Zorn

1. "Ebuhuel" - 3:51
2. "Kasbeel" - 4:17
3. "Vual" - 4:58
4. "Parzial-Oranir" - 11:10
5. "Egion" - 5:43
6. "Neriah-Mahariel" - 7:03
7. "Tandal" - 3:35
8. "Monadel" - 5:51

== Personnel ==
- David Krakauer - clarinet, bass clarinet
- Sheryl Bailey - guitar
- Jerome Harris - electric bass, voice
- Keepalive - laptop
- Michael Sarin - drums
