= Filmworks XVIII: The Treatment =

Soundtrack album by John Zorn
- Released: March 13, 2006
- Recorded: 2005
- Genre: avant-garde, jazz, classical, tango music
- Length: 50:12
- Label: Tzadik TZ 7355
- Producer: John Zorn

Filmworks chronology
| Filmworks XVII: Notes on Marie Menken/Ray Bandar: A Life with Skulls (2006) | Filmworks XVIII: The Treatment (2006) | Filmworks XIX: The Rain Horse (2008) |

John Zorn chronology
| Filmworks XVII: Notes on Marie Menken/Ray Bandar: A Life with Skulls (2006) | Filmworks XVIII: The Treatment (2006) | Orobas: Book of Angels Volume 4 (2006) |

Filmworks XVIII: The Treatment features a score for film by John Zorn. The album was released on Zorn's own label, Tzadik Records, in 2006 and contains music that Zorn wrote and recorded for the romantic comedy, The Treatment (2006), directed by Oren Rudavsky.

== Reception ==
The Allmusic review by Thom Jurek awarded the album 4 stars stating "This plays, as have all of Zorn's scores of late, like a piece, a gorgeous piece of divinely inspired tight writing that brings not only the Argentinean tango to mind, but also klezmer, Yiddish folk music, and even cantorial music. There is a bit of Radical Jewish Culture in everything Zorn writes, and this set is a furthering of his own vision. Suffice it to say, and even though he doesn't let on in the liner notes, his scoring of The Treatment may have even surprised the composer himself". John Zorn who composed the score for the film won a MacArthur Foundation, the "Genius" award for his music in 2006.

Professional ratings
Review scores
| Source | Rating |
|---|---|
| Allmusic | 4/5 stars |

== Track listing ==
All compositions by John Zorn

1. "The Treatment" - 3:34
2. "Romance" - 5:10
3. "Why Me?" - 3:56
4. "Family" - 2:15
5. "Marking Time" - 4:53
6. "Anxieties" - 5:00
7. "Freud's Rondo" - 4:26
8. "Totem and Taboo" - 6:55
9. "Rush Hour" - 3:47
10. "Bad Dreams" - 1:20
11. "Uncertainty" - 6:24
12. "Happy Ending" - 2:44

== Personnel ==
- Shanir Ezra Blumenkranz - bass
- Rob Burger - accordion
- Mark Feldman - violin
- Kenny Wollesen - vibraphone
- Marc Ribot - guitar
