= Tzadik Records =

American record label

- Founded: 1995
- Founder: John Zorn, Kazunori Sugiyama
- Distributor: Redeye Distribution
- Genre: Avant-garde jazz, improvised music, experimental
- Country of origin: U.S.
- Location: New York City
- Official website: tzadik.com

Tzadik is a record label in New York City that specializes in avant-garde and experimental music. The label was established by composer and saxophonist John Zorn in 1995. He is the executive producer of all Tzadik releases. Tzadik is a not-for-profit, cooperative record label.

Tzadik has released over 900 albums by a variety of artists with diverse musical backgrounds, including free improvisation, jazz, noise, klezmer, rock, and experimental composition.

On the label's catalogue are releases by Zorn himself and his multifaceted "songbook" group Masada; singer Mike Patton; guitarists Derek Bailey, Yoshihide Otomo, Tim Sparks, Buckethead and Keiji Haino; noise music icon Merzbow; composers Gordon Mumma, Frank Denyer, Arnold Dreyblatt, and Teiji Ito; experimental groups Kayo Dot, Time of Orchids and Rashanim, microtonalists Syzygys; drummer Tatsuya Yoshida and his bands Ruins and Korekyojinn; trumpeter Wadada Leo Smith; electroacoustic composer Noah Creshevsky; and jazz saxophonist Steve Coleman.

== Roster ==
- Oren Ambarchi
- Mick Barr
- Steven Bernstein
- Lisa Bielawa
- Shanir Ezra Blumenkranz
- Kitty Brazelton
- Chris Brown
- Rob Burger
- Uri Caine
- Jennifer Charles
- Greg Cohen
- Alvin Curran
- Dave Douglas
- Mark Dresser
- Arnold Dreyblatt
- Toby Driver
- Trevor Dunn
- Marty Ehrlich
- Jewlia Eisenberg
- Erik Friedlander
- Fred Frith
- Satoko Fujii
- Annie Gosfield
- Milford Graves
- Guerilla Toss
- Jesse Harris
- Timba Harris
- Gerry Hemingway
- Robin Holcomb
- Yuka Honda
- Wayne Horvitz
- Teiji Ito
- Scott Johnson
- Phillip Johnston
- Henry Kaiser
- Eyvind Kang
- Guy Klucevsek
- Sean Lennon
- George E. Lewis
- Lukas Ligeti
- Frank London
- Jon Madof
- Billy Martin
- Mono
- Ikue Mori
- Dafna Naphtali
- Aya Nishina
- Chieko Mori
- Aaron Novik
- Larry Ochs
- Jim O'Rourke
- Evan Parker
- Mike Patton
- Paola Prestini
- Marc Ribot
- Gyan Riley
- Ned Rothenberg
- Joel Rubin
- Basya Schechter
- Wadada Leo Smith
- Tim Sparks
- J. G. Thirlwell
- Matthew Welch
- Doug Wieselman
- Witch 'n' Monk
- John Zorn

== Discography ==
=== 7000/8000/9000 series: Composer ===
Catalog number	Date released	Artist	Title	Notes
7000 series
TZ 7001	1995	Alvin Curran	Animal Behavior	
TZ 7002	1995	Chris Brown	Lava	
TZ 7003	1995	Mamoru Fujieda	The Night Chant	
TZ 7004	1995	Arnold Dreyblatt	Animal Magnetism	
TZ 7005	1996	David Shea	Hsi-Yu Chi	
TZ 7006	1997	Mark Feldman	Music for Violin Alone	
TZ 7006b	2008-02	Mark Feldman	Music for Violin Alone	2008 reissue
TZ 7007	1995	Gisburg	No Stranger Not at All	
TZ 7008	1995	John Zorn	Redbird	
TZ 7009	1995	John Zorn	The Book of Heads	
TZ 7010	1995	Yuji Takahashi	Finger Light	
TZ 7011	1995	Jim O'Rourke	Terminal Pharmacy	
TZ 7012	1995	Harry Partch	17 Lyrics of Li Po	
TZ 7013	1996	Eyvind Kang	7 Nades	
TZ 7014	1996	Li Chin Sung	Past	
TZ 7015	1996	Mike Patton	Adult Themes for Voice	
TZ 7016	1996	Elliott Sharp	XenocodeX	
TZ 7017	1996	Wadada Leo Smith	Tao-Njia	
TZ 7018	1996	Guy Klucevsek	Stolen Memories	
TZ 7019	1996	Gisburg	Shadows in the Sea	
TZ 7020	1996	Ikue Mori	Garden	
TZ 7021	1997	Bun-Ching Lam	...Like Water	
TZ 7022	1997	Mike Patton	Pranzo Oltranzista	
TZ 7023	1997	John Zorn	Duras: Duchamp	
TZ 7024	1997	David Slusser	Delight at the End of the Tunnel	
TZ 7025	1997	Mamoru Fujieda	Patterns of Plants	
TZ 7026	1997	Virgil Moorefield	The Temperature in Hell Is over Three Thousand Degrees	
TZ 7027	1997	Mark Dresser	Banquet	
TZ 7028	1998	John Zorn	Angelus Novus	
TZ 7029	1998	Daniel Goode	Tunnel-Funnel	
TZ 7030	1998	Milford Graves	Grand Unification	
TZ 7031	1998	Bun-Ching Lam	The Child God	
TZ 7031b	2016-10	Bun-Ching Lam	The Child God	2016 reissue
TZ 7032	1998	Eyvind Kang	Theater of Mineral NADEs	
TZ 7033	1998	Luc Ferrari	Cellule 75	
TZ 7034	1998	Fred Frith	Pacifica	
TZ 7035	1998	Norman Yamada	Being and Time	
TZ 7036	1998	Teiji Ito	King Ubu	
TZ 7037	1998	John Zorn	Aporias: Requia for Piano and Orchestra	
TZ 7038	1998-10	Gisburg	Trust	
TZ 7039	1998-11	Alvin Curran	Theme Park	
TZ 7040	1998-11	Annie Gosfield	Burnt Ivory and Loose Wires	
TZ 7041	1998	David Shea	Classical Works	
TZ 7042	1999-04	Mark DeGliAntoni	Horse Tricks	
TZ 7043	1999-02	Maryanne Amacher	Sound Characters	
TZ 7044	1999-03	Bill Laswell	Invisible Design	
TZ 7045	1999-06	Jerry Hunt	Song Drapes	
TZ 7045b	2016-02	Jerry Hunt	Song Drapes	2016 reissue
TZ 7046	1999-07	Wadada Leo Smith	Light upon Light	
TZ 7047	1999-07	John Zorn	The String Quartets	
TZ 7048	1999-08	Lee Hyla	Riff and Transfiguration	
TZ 7049	1999-09	Zeena Parkins	Pan-Acousticon	
TZ 7050	1999-09	Giustino di Gregorio	Sprut	
TZ 7051	1999	Otomo Yoshihide	Cathode	
TZ 7052	1999-11	Gerry Hemingway	Chamber Works	
TZ 7053	2000-01	Peter Garland	The Days Run Away	
TZ 7054	2000-01	George Lewis	Endless Shout	
TZ 7055	2000	Ikue Mori	One Hundred Aspects of the Moon	
TZ 7056	2000-04	Lois Vierk	River Beneath the River	
TZ 7057	2000-05	Susie Ibarra	Flower After Flower	
TZ 7058	2000-05	Bill Brovold	Childish Delusions	
TZ 7059	2000-06	Eyvind Kang	The Story of Iceland	
TZ 7060	2000-06	Wadada Leo Smith	Reflectativity	
TZ 7060b	2016-08	Wadada Leo Smith	Reflectativity	2016 reissue
TZ 7061	2000-08	Ned Rothenberg	Ghost Stories	
TZ 7061b	2016-11	Ned Rothenberg	Ghost Stories	2016 reissue
TZ 7062	2000-11	Milford Graves	Stories	
TZ 7063	2000-12	Mark Dresser	Marinade	
TZ 7064	2001-01	David Mahler	Hearing Voices	
TZ 7065	2001-05	John Zorn	Madness, Love and Mysticism	
TZ 7066	2001-06	John Zorn	Songs from the Hermetic Theatre	
TZ 7067	2001-07	Jose Maceda	Gongs and Bamboos	
TZ 7067b	2016-01	Jose Maceda	Gongs and Bamboos	2016 reissue
TZ 7068	2001-08	Ikue Mori	Labyrinth	
TZ 7069	2001-09	Annie Gosfield	Flying Sparks and Heavy Machinery	
TZ 7070	2001-09	Wadada Leo Smith	Red Sulphur Sky	
TZ 7071	2001-10	Christian Wolff	Burdocks	
TZ 7072	2002-02	Bobby Previte	The 23 Constellations of Joan Miro	
TZ 7073	2001-11	Otomo Yoshihide	Anode	
TZ 7074	2002-01	Gordon Mumma	Live-Electronic Music	
TZ 7075	2002-01	Alvin Singleton	Somehow We Can	
TZ 7076	2002-02	Fred Frith	Freedom in Fragments	
TZ 7076b	2016-09	Fred Frith	Freedom in Fragments	2016 reissue
TZ 7077	2002-04	Charles Wuorinen	LEPTON	
TZ 7078	2002-06	Pierre-Yves Macé	Faux-Jumeaux	
TZ 7079	2002-08	David Shea	Classical Works II	
TZ 7080	2002-08	Derek Bailey	Pieces for Guitar	
TZ 7081	2002-09	Eric Qin	Photographs: 1988–1993	
TZ 7082	2002-10	Frank Denyer	Fired City	
TZ 7083	2002-11	Wadada Leo Smith	Luminous Axis (The Caravans of Winter and Summer)	
TZ 7084	2003-02	Elliott Sharp	String Quartets 1986–1996	
TZ 7085	2003-04	John Zorn	Chimeras	2003 release - Out of Print
TZ 7085b	2010-02	John Zorn	Chimeras	2010 reissue
TZ 7086	2003-05	Raz Mesinai	Resurrections for Goatskin	
TZ 7087	2003-06	Carolyn Yarnell	Sonic Vision	
TZ 7088	2003-07	Milton Babbitt	Occasional Variations	
TZ 7089	2003-08	Marc Ribot	Scelsi Morning	
TZ 7090	2003-08	Julius Hemphill	One Atmosphere	
TZ 7091	2003-10	Chien-Yin Chen	Purr	
TZ 7092	2003-10	Kayo Dot	Choirs of the Eye	
TZ 7093	2004-04	Jerry Hunt	Phalba	
TZ 7094	2003-11	Mark Applebaum	Catfish	
TZ 7095	2004-01	Anthony Pateras	Mutant Theatre	
TZ 7096	2004-02	Ernesto Martinez	Mutaciones	
TZ 7097	2004-03	Alvin Curran	Lost Marbles	
TZ 7098	2004-04	Susie Ibarra	Folkloriko	
TZ 7099	2004-06	Lukas Ligeti	Mystery System	
8000 series
TZ 8001	2004-06	David Simons	Prismatic Hearing	
TZ 8002	2004-07	Morton Feldman	Patterns in a Chromatic Field	
TZ 8003	2004-08	Raz Mesinai	Cyborg Acoustics	
TZ 8004	2004-08	Christopher Adler	Epilogue for a Dark Day	
TZ 8005	2004-09	Richard Crandell	Mbira Magic	
TZ 8005b	2016-03	Richard Crandell	Mbira Magic	
TZ 8006	2004-10	John Zorn	Magick	
TZ 8007	2004-11	Annie Gosfield	Lost Signals and Drifting Satellites	
TZ 8008	2004-11	Wadada Leo Smith	Lake Biwa	
TZ 8009	2004-11	Scott Johnson	John Somebody	
TZ 8010	2005-01	Charles Wuorinen	On Alligators	
TZ 8011	2005-02	John Zorn	Rituals	
TZ 8012	2005-02	Peter Garland	Love Songs	
TZ 8013	2005-04	Time of Orchids	Sarcast While	
TZ 8014	2005-03	Chris Brown	Rogue Wave	
TZ 8015	2005-03	Matthew Welch	Dream Tigers	
TZ 8016	2005-04	Jacques Coursil	Minimal Brass	
TZ 8017	2005-10	Brad Lubman	Insomniac	
TZ 8018	2005-11	John Zorn	Mysterium	
TZ 8019	2005-10	Toby Driver	In the L..L..Library Loft	
TZ 8020	2006-01	Jon Gibson	Criss X Cross	
TZ 8021	2006-02	Wayne Horvitz	Whispers, Hymns and a Murmur	
TZ 8022	2006-05	Zeena Parkins	Necklace	
TZ 8023	2006-07	John King	AllSteel	
TZ 8024	2006-08	Anthony Coleman	Pushy Blueness	
TZ 8025	2006-09	Billy Martin	Starlings	
TZ 8026	2006-09	Evan Parker	Time Lapse	
TZ 8027	2006-11	Lee Hyla	Wilson's Ivory-Bill	
TZ 8028	2006-11	Earle Brown	Folio and Four Systems	
TZ 8029	2007-01	Scott Johnson	Patty Hearst	
TZ 8030	2007-02	Mick Barr	Octis: Iohargh Wended	
TZ 8031	2007-03	Teiji Ito	Tenno	
TZ 8032	2007-03	Derek Keller	Impositions and Consequences	
TZ 8033	2007-04	Sylvie Courvoisier	Signs and Epigrams	
TZ 8034	2007-05	M C Maguire	Meta–Conspiracy	
TZ 8035	2007-06	John Zorn	From Silence to Sorcery	
TZ 8036	2007-07	Noah Creshevsky	To Know and Not to Know	
TZ 8037	2007-07	Ha-Yang Kim	Ama	
TZ 8038	2007-08	Teiji Ito	Music for Maya: Early Film Music of Teiji Ito	2xCD
TZ 8038b	2016-04	Teiji Ito	Music for Maya: Early Film Music of Teiji Ito	2016 reissue
TZ 8039	2007-09	Lisa Bielawa	A Handful of World	
TZ 8040	2007-10	Guy Klucevsek	Song of Remembrance	
TZ 8041	2007-11	Richard Crandell	Spring Steel	
TZ 8042	2007-11	Eyvind Kang	The Yelm Sessions	
TZ 8043	2007-11	Jose Maceda	Drone and Melody	
TZ 8044	2008-01	Chris Dench	Beyond Status Geometry	
TZ 8045	2008-01	Fred Frith	Back to Life	
TZ 8046	2008-02	Marc Ribot	Exercises in Futility	
TZ 8047	2008-02	Ahleuchatistas	The Same and the Other	
TZ 8048	2008-03	Teiji Ito	The Shamanic Principles	
TZ 8049	2008-04	Jeremiah Cymerman	In Memory of the Labyrinth System	
TZ 8050-3	2008-04	The Hub	Boundary Layer	3xCD box set
TZ 8051	2008-04	Maja S.K. Ratkje	River Mouth Echoes	
TZ 8052	2008-05	Elliott Sharp	String Quartets: 2002–2007	
TZ 8053	2008-06	Keeril Makan	In Sound	
TZ 8054	2008-06	Lukas Ligeti	Afrikan Machinery	
TZ 8055	2008-08	Maryanne Amacher	Sound Characters vol. 2	
TZ 8056	2008-08	Berangere Maximin	Tant que les heures passent	
TZ 8057	2008-08	Anthony Pateras	Chromatophore	
TZ 8058	2008-08	Teiji Ito	Watermill	
TZ 8059	2008-09	Peter Garland	Three Strange Angels	
TZ 8060	2008-09	Paola Prestini	Body Maps	
TZ 8061	2008-10	Mamoru Fujieda	Patterns of Plants II	
TZ 8062	2009-03	Bill Laswell	Invisible Design II	
TZ 8063	2008-11	Wu Fei	Yuan	
TZ 8064	2009-04	Stabat Akish	Stabat Akish	
TZ 8065	2009-09	Mario Diaz de Leon	Enter Houses Of	
TZ 8066	2009-09	Ahleuchatistas	Of the Body Prone	
TZ 8067	2009-10	David Simons	Fung Sha Noon	
TZ 8068	2009-11	Jose Maceda	Ugnayan	
TZ 8069	2010-01	Noah Creshevsky	The Twilight of the Gods	
TZ 8070	2010-02	Terry Riley	Autodreamographical Tales	
TZ 8071	2010-02	John King	10 Mysteries	
TZ 8072	2010-03	J.G. Thirlwell	Manorexia: The Mesopelagic Waters	
TZ 8073	2010-04	Ned Rothenberg	Quintet for Clarinet and Strings	
TZ 8074	2010-05	Scott Johnson	Americans	
TZ 8075	2010-07	Karl Berger	Strangely Familiar	
TZ 8076	2010-10	John Zorn	What Thou Wilt	
TZ 8077	2010-11	Matthew Welch	Blarvuster	
TZ 8078	2011-01	Gyan Riley	Stream of Gratitude	
TZ 8079	2011-02	Ron Anderson's Pak	Secret Curve	
TZ 8080	2011-04	Ryan Francis	Works for Piano	
TZ 8081	2011-05	George Lewis	Les Exercices Spirituels	
TZ 8082	2011-08	Jeremiah Cymerman	Fire Sign	
TZ 8083	2011-10	Andy Laster	Riptide	
TZ 8084	2012-02	Anna Clyne	Blue Moth	
TZ 8085	2012-05	Ned Rothenberg	World of Odd Harmonics	
TZ 8086	2012-05	Timba Harris	neXus: Cascadia	
TZ 8087	2012-07	Fausto Romitelli	Anamorphosis	
TZ 8088	2012-08	Annie Gosfield	Almost Truths and Open Deceptions	
TZ 8089	2012-09	Eyvind Kang	Grass	
TZ 8090	2012-10	Ernesto Martinez	Sincronario	
TZ 8091	2012-10	David Rosenboom	Life Field	
TZ 8092	2012-10	John Zorn	Music and Its Double	
TZ 8093	2013-01	Lee Hyla	My Life on the Plains	
TZ 8094	2013-02	Anthony Coleman	The End of Summer	
TZ 8095	2013-02	John Zorn	Lemma	
TZ 8096	2013-03	Gloria Coates	At Midnight	
TZ 8097	2013-07	Noah Creshevsky	The Four Seasons	
TZ 8098	2013-07	Aya Nishina	Flora	
TZ 8099	2013-07	David Fulmer	On Night	
9000 series
TZ 9001	2013-09	Jacques Demierre	Breaking Stone	
TZ 9002	2013-09	Pierre-Yves Macé	Segments et Apostilles	
TZ 9003	2013-11	John Zorn	On the Torment of Saints, the Casting of Spells and the Evocation of Spirits	
TZ 9004	2014-01	Adam Roberts	Leaf Metal	
TZ 9005	2014-02	Matthew Barnson	Sibyl Tones	
TZ 9006	2015-05	Jason Eckardt	Subject	
TZ 9007	2014-03	Tobias Picker	Invisible Lilacs	
TZ 9008	2014-03	Ha-Yang Kim	Threadsuns	

=== 7100/8100 series: Radical Jewish Culture ===
Catalog number	Date released	Artist	Title	Notes
7100 series
TZ 7101	1995	David Krakauer	Klezmer Madness!	
TZ 7102	1995	Anthony Coleman	Sephardic Tinge	
TZ 7103	1995	New Klezmer Trio	Melt Zonk Rewire	
TZ 7104	1995	Shelley Hirsch	O Little Town of East New York	
TZ 7105	1995	Richard Teitelbaum	Golem	
TZ 7106	1995	Mystic Fugu Orchestra	Zohar	
TZ 7107	1996	Erik Friedlander	The Watchman	
TZ 7108-2	1996	John Zorn	Bar Kokhba	2xCD
TZ 7109	1996	Zeena Parkins	Mouth=Maul=Betrayer	
TZ 7110	1996	Anthony Coleman	Selfhaters	
TZ 7111	1996	Kletka Red	Hijacking	
TZ 7112	1996	New Klezmer Trio	Masks and Faces	
TZ 7113	1997	Nathanson & Coleman	I Could've Been a Drum	
TZ 7114-2	1997	Various artists	Great Jewish Music: Burt Bacharach	2xCD
TZ 7115	1997	John Schott	In These Great Times	
TZ 7116	1997	Various artists	Great Jewish Music: Serge Gainsbourg	
TZ 7117	1997	Someck & Sharp	Revenge of the Stuttering Child	
TZ 7118	1997	Naftule's Dream	Search for the Golden Dreydl	
TZ 7119	1998	Kramer	Let me explain something to you about Art	
TZ 7120	1998	Ben Goldberg, John Schott, Michael Sarin	What Comes Before	
TZ 7121	1998	Gary Lucas	Busy Being Born	
TZ 7122-2	1998	John Zorn	The Circle Maker	2xCD
TZ 7123	1998	Anthony Coleman	The Abysmal Richness of the Infinite Proximity of the Same	
TZ 7124	1998	Steve Lacy	Sands	
TZ 7125	1998	Naftule's Dream	Smash, Clap!	
TZ 7126	1998	Various artists	Great Jewish Music: Marc Bolan	
TZ 7127	1998-10	David Krakauer	Klezmer, NY	
TZ 7128	1998-10	Sephardic Tinge	Morenica	
TZ 7129	1998-11	London / Sklamberg / Caine	Nigunim	
TZ 7130	1999-01	Glenn Spearman	Blues for Falasha	
TZ 7130b	2016-01	Glenn Spearman	Blues for Falasha	2016 reissue
TZ 7131	1999-01	Ambarchi/Avenaim	The Alter Rebbe's Nigun	
TZ 7132	1999-02	Psamim	Abi Gezint!	
TZ 7133	1999-04	Ahava Raba	Kete Kuf	
TZ 7134	1999-05	Marc Ribot/Shrek	Yo! I Killed Your God	
TZ 7135	1999-06	Davka	Judith	
TZ 7136	1999-06	Marty Ehrlich	Sojourn	
TZ 7137	1999-07	Steven Bernstein	Diaspora Soul	
TZ 7138	1999-08	Tim Sparks	Neshamah	
TZ 7139	2000-03	Danny Zamir	Satlah	
TZ 7140	2001-04	Davka	Lavy's Dream	
TZ 7141	2000-06	New Klezmer Trio	Short for Something	
TZ 7142	2000-07	Jamie Saft	Sovlanut	
TZ 7143	2000-09	The Cracow Klezmer Band	De Profundis	
TZ 7144	2000-09	Tim Sparks	Tanz	
TZ 7145	2000-11	Gary Lucas	Street of Lost Brothers	
TZ 7146	2001-01	Oren Bloedow and Jennifer Charles	La Mar Enfortuna	
TZ 7147	2000-12	Frank London	Invocations	
TZ 7148	2001-01	Zakarya	Zakarya	
TZ 7149	2001-03	Satlah	Exodus	
TZ 7150	2001-08	Wolf Krakowski	Transmigrations: Gilgul	
TZ 7151	2001-09	Raz Mesinai	Before the Law	
TZ 7152	2001-10	Fima Ephron	Soul Machine	
TZ 7153	2001-11	Naftule's Dream	Job	
TZ 7154	2001-11	Erik Friedlander	Grains of Paradise	
TZ 7155	2001-11	Jewlia Eisenberg	Trilectic	
TZ 7156	2001-11	David Gould	Adonai in Dub	
TZ 7157	2001-11	The Cracow Klezmer Band	The Warriors	
TZ 7158	2002-01	Roberto Rodriguez	El Danzon de Moises	
TZ 7159	2002-02	Sephardic Tinge	Our Beautiful Garden Is Open	
TZ 7160	2002-04	Tim Sparks	At the Rebbe's Table	
TZ 7161	2002-05	Z'ev	The Sapphire Nature	
TZ 7161b	2016-11	Z'ev	The Sapphire Nature	2016 reissue
TZ 7162	2002-05	Jamie Saft	Breadcrumb Sins	
TZ 7163	2002-06	Paul Brody's Sadawi	Kabbalah Dream	
TZ 7164	2002-06	Steven Bernstein	Diaspora Blues	
TZ 7165	2002-06	Jenny Scheinman	The Rabbi's Lover	
TZ 7166	2002-06	Wolf Krakowski	Goyrl : Destiny	
TZ 7167	2002-06	Frank London	Scientist at Work	
TZ 7168	2002-06	Rabbinical School Dropouts	Cosmic Tree	
TZ 7169	2002-10	Satlah	Children of Israel	
TZ 7170	2002-11	Rob Burger	Lost Photograph	
TZ 7171	2003-01	John Zorn	Masada Anniversary Edition Vol. 1: Masada Guitars	
TZ 7172	2003-03	John Zorn	Masada Anniversary Edition Vol. 2: Voices in the Wilderness	
TZ 7173	2003-01	Various artists	Great Jewish Music: Sasha Argov	see: Sasha Argov
TZ 7173b	2016-05	Various artists	Great Jewish Music: Sasha Argov	2016 reissue
TZ 7174	2003-02	Paul Shapiro	Midnight Minyan	
TZ 7175	2003-02	Ben Perowsky	Camp Songs	
TZ 7176	2003-03	Kramer	The Greenberg Variations	
TZ 7177	2003-03	Zahava Seewald and Psamim	KOVED: A Tribute to Martin Weinberg	
TZ 7178	2003-04	Jon Madof	Rashanim	
TZ 7179	2003-04	Koby Israelite	Dance of the Idiots	
TZ 7180	2003-05	Borah Bergman	Meditations for Piano	
TZ 7181	2003-07	John Zorn	Masada Anniversary Edition Vol. 3: The Unknown Masada	
TZ 7182	2003-10	Ted Reichman	Emigre	
TZ 7183	2003-09	The Cracow Klezmer Band	Bereshit	
TZ 7184	2003-10	Zakarya	Something Obvious	
TZ 7185	2003-11	Davka	The Golem	
TZ 7186	2004-03	Greg Wall	Later Prophets	
TZ 7187	2004-05	Pharaoh's Daughter	Out of the Reeds	
TZ 7188	2004-07	Paul Brody	Beyond Babylon	
TZ 7189	2004-06	Roberto Rodriguez	Baila! Gitano Baila!	
TZ 7190	2004-06	John Zorn	Masada Anniversary Edition Vol. 4: Masada Recital	
TZ 7191	2004-09	Steven Bernstein	Hollywood Diaspora	
TZ 7192	2004-07	Various artists	Great Jewish Music: Jacob do Bandolim	see: Jacob do Bandolim
TZ 7192b	2016-03	Various artists	Great Jewish Music: Jacob do Bandolim	2016 reissue
TZ 7193	2004-08	Basya Schechter	Queen's Dominion	
TZ 7194	2004-09	Aaron Alexander	Midrash Mish Mosh	
TZ 7195	2004-10	Shirim Klezmer Orchestra	Pincus and the Pig: a Klezmer Tale	
TZ 7196	2004-10	David Krakauer	Music from the Winery	
TZ 7197	2004-11	Charming Hostess	Sarajevo Blues	
TZ 7198	2005-01	Zohara	Scorched Lips	
TZ 7199	2005-01	Koby Israelite	Mood Swings	
8100 series
TZ 8101	2005-05	Andy Statman	Avodas Halevi	
TZ 8102	2005-06	Frank London	Hazònos	
TZ 8103	2005-08	John Zorn	Masada Anniversary Edition Vol. 5: Masada Rock	
TZ 8104	2005-09	Davka	Davka Live	
TZ 8105	2005-10	Eyal Maoz	Edom	
TZ 8106	2006-02	Anthony Coleman	Shmutsige Magnaten: Coleman Plays Gebirtig	
TZ 8107	2006-02	Paul Shapiro	It's in the Twilight	
TZ 8108	2006-06	Ayelet Rose Gottlieb	Mayim Rabim	
TZ 8109	2006-07	Irving Fields meets Roberto Rodriguez	Oy Vey!!!...Olé!!!	
TZ 8110	2006-08	Zakarya	413 A	
TZ 8111	2006-08	Jamie Saft Trio	Trouble: The Jamie Saft Trio Plays Bob Dylan	
TZ 8111b	2016-06	Jamie Saft Trio	Trouble: The Jamie Saft Trio Plays Bob Dylan	2016 reissue
TZ 8112	2006-10	Rashanim	Shalosh	
TZ 8113	2006-10	Alon Nechushtan and Talat	The Growl	
TZ 8114	2007-01	Ned Rothenberg's Sync with Strings	Inner Diaspora	
TZ 8115	2007-02	Boris Malkovsky	Time Petah-Tiqva	
TZ 8116	2007-03	The Cracow Klezmer Band	Remembrance	
TZ 8117	2007-04	Irving Fields Trio	My Yiddishe Mama's Favorites	
TZ 8118	2007-05	Paul Brody	For the Moment	
TZ 8119	2007-09	Dan Kaufman	Force of Light	
TZ 8120	2007-10	La Mar Enfortuna	Conviviencia	
TZ 8121	2007-11	David Buchbinder	Odessa/Havana	
TZ 8122	2008-01	Steven Bernstein	Diaspora Suite	
TZ 8123	2008-03	Oren Ambarchi and z'ev	Spirit Transform Me	
TZ 8124	2008-04	Tangele	The Pulse of Yiddish Tango	
TZ 8125	2008-05	Daniel Zamir	I Believe	
TZ 8126	2008-06	Paul Shapiro	Essen	
TZ 8127	2008-06	Klez-Edge	Ancestors, Mindreles, Nagila Monsters	
TZ 8128	2008-09	Yoshie Fruchter	Pitom	
TZ 8129	2008-10	Zakarya	The True Story Concerning Martin Behaim	
TZ 8130	2009-01	Feldman / Caine / Cohen / Baron	Secrets	
TZ 8131	2009-01	Borah Bergman Trio	Luminescence	
TZ 8132	2009-01	Ori Dakari	Entrances	
TZ 8133	2009-01	Jamie Saft	Black Shabbis	
TZ 8134	2009-02	Daphna Sadeh & the Voyagers	Reconciliation	
TZ 8135	2009-02	Uri Gurvich	The Storyteller	
TZ 8136	2009-02	Roberto Rodriguez	The First Basket	
TZ 8137	2009-03	Greg Wall's Later Prophets	The Kook Project	
TZ 8138	2009-03	Tafillalt	Tafillalt	
TZ 8139	2009-04	Pissuk Rachav	Eretz Hakodesh	
TZ 8140	2009-05	Roberto Rodriguez	Timba Talmud	
TZ 8141	2009-05	Frank London/Lorin Sklamberg	Tsuker-zis	
TZ 8142	2009-06	Perry Robinson and Burton Greene	Two Voices in the Desert	
TZ 8143	2009-06	Tim Sparks	Little Princess	
TZ 8144	2009-07	Rashanim	The Gathering	
TZ 8145	2009-07	Koby Israelite	Is He Listening?	
TZ 8146	2009-08	Ben Goldberg	Speech Communication	
TZ 8147	2009-08	Eyal Maoz's Edom	Hope and Destruction	
TZ 8148	2009-08	David Taylor	Red Sea	
TZ 8149	2009-10	David Gould	Feast of the Passover	
TZ 8150	2010-04	AutorYno	Pastrami Bagel Social Club	
TZ 8151	2010-06	Rafi Malkiel	Water	
TZ 8152	2010-06	Charming Hostess	The Bowls Project	
TZ 8153	2010-07	Jeremy Fogel	Exorcism	
TZ 8154	2010-08	Gabriele Coen "Jewish Experience"	Awakening	
TZ 8155	2010-08	Marty Ehrlich	Fables	
TZ 8156	2010-09	Omer Klein	Rockets on the Balcony	
TZ 8157	2010-10	Arnold Dreyblatt	Who's Who in Central & East Europe 1933	
TZ 8158	2011-02	Pitom	Blasphemy and other Serious Crimes	
TZ 8159	2011-03	David Solid Gould vs Bill Laswell	Dub of the Passover	
TZ 8160	2011-04	Mazal	Axerico en Selanik	
TZ 8161	2011-05	Artichaut Orkestra	T for Teresa	
TZ 8162	2011-06	Klezmerson	Siete	
TZ 8163	2011-07	Joel Rubin/Uri Caine Duo	Azoy Tsu Tsveyt	
TZ 8164	2011-08	Jamie Saft	Borscht Belt Studies	
TZ 8165	2011-10	Basya Schechter	Songs of Wonder	
TZ 8166	2011-10	Zakarya	Greatest Hits	
TZ 8167	2012-01	Terry Riley	Aleph	
TZ 8168	2012-02	Aaron Novik	Secret of Secrets	
TZ 8169	2012-04	Samech	Quachatta	
TZ 8170	2012-07	Bester Quartet	Metamorphoses	
TZ 8171-5	2012-11	Hasidic New Wave	The Complete Recordings	5xCD box set
TZ 8172	2013-01	Gabriele Coen	Yiddish Melodies in Jazz	
TZ 8173	2013-02	Dora Juárez Kiczkovsky	Cantos para una Diáspora	
TZ 8174	2013-04	Uri Gurvich	BabEl	
TZ 8175	2013-04	Jon Madof	Zion80	
TZ 8176	2013-06	Alvin Curran	Shofar Rags	
TZ 8177	2013-06	David Buchbinder	Walk to the Sea	
TZ 8178	2013-06	Bester Quartet	The Golden Land	
TZ 8179	2013-06	Deveykus	Pillar Without Mercy	
TZ 8180	2013-08	Barbez	Bella Ciao	
TZ 8181	2013-08	AutorYno	Cosmopolitan Traffic	
TZ 8182	2014-08	Zebrina	Hamidbar Medaber	
TZ 8183	2014-05	Ty Citerman	Bop Kabbalah	
TZ 8184	2014-05	Haggai Cohen-Milo	Penguin	
TZ 8185	2014-05	Paul Shapiro	Shofarot Verses	

=== 7200 series: New Japan ===
Catalog number	Date released	Artist	Title	Notes
TZ 7201	1995	Ikue Mori	Hex Kitchen	
TZ 7202	1995	Ruins	Hyderomastgroningem	
TZ 7203	1995	Haino Keiji	Tenshi no Gijinka	
TZ 7204	1995	Ground Zero	Null and Void	
TZ 7205	1995	Derek and the Ruins	Saisoro	
TZ 7206	1995	Yamataka Eye/John Zorn	Nani Nani	
TZ 7207	1995	Death Ambient	Death Ambient	
TZ 7208	1995	Makigami Koichi	Kuchinoha	
TZ 7209	1996	Zubi Zuva	Jehovah	
TZ 7210	1996	Jon	Smoke	
TZ 7211	1997	Compostela	Wadachi	
TZ 7212	1997	Yasunao Tone	Solo for Wounded CD	
TZ 7213	1998	Tetsu Inoue	Psycho-Acoustic	
TZ 7214	1998	Merzbow	1930	
TZ 7215	1998-06	Ruins	Symphonica	
TZ 7216	1998-10	Makigami Koichi	Electric Eel	
TZ 7217	1998-11	Death Praxis: Tenko/Ikue Mori	Mystery	
TZ 7218	1999-01	Yagi Michiyo	Shizuku	
TZ 7219	1999-02	Melt Banana	MxBx 1998 / 13,000 miles at light velocity	
TZ 7220	1999-02	Satoko Fujii	Kitsune-bi	
TZ 7221-2	1999-03	Purple Trap	Decided... Already the Motionless Heart of Tranquility, Tangling the Prayer Called "I"	2xCD
TZ 7222	1999-03	MicroCosmos	Pilgrimage	
TZ 7223	1999-08	Korekyojin	Korekyojin	
TZ 7224	1999-10	Friction	Zone Tripper	
TZ 7224b	2016-04	Friction	Zone Tripper	2016 reissue
TZ 7225	1999-11	Motor Humming	Musical Aluminum	
TZ 7226	1999-11	Death Ambient	Synaesthesia	
TZ 7227	2000-01	Ayuo	Izutsu	
TZ 7228	2000-04	Dosage	Empties	
TZ 7229	2000-05	Tetsu Inoue	Fragments Dots	
TZ 7230	2000-05	Hoahio	Ohayo! Hoahio!	
TZ 7231	2001-01	Aiko Shimada	Blue Marble	
TZ 7232	2001-05	Otomo Yoshihide's New Jazz Quintet	Flutter	
TZ 7233	2001-07	à qui avec Gabriel	Utsuho	
TZ 7234	2001-08	Ruins	Live at Kichijoji /Mandala II	live
TZ 7235	2001-10	Hikashu	Hikashu History	
TZ 7236	2001-10	Syzygys	Eyes on Green: Syzygys Live at Tokyo Inkstick 1988	live
TZ 7236b	2016-06	Syzygys	Eyes on Green: Syzygys Live at Tokyo Inkstick 1988	2016 reissue
TZ 7237	2001-11	Mono	Under the Pipal Tree	
TZ 7238	2002-03	Otomo Yoshihide's New Jazz Ensemble	Dreams	
TZ 7239-2	2002-04	Rovo	Tonic	2xCD
TZ 7240	2003-01	Syzygys	Complete Studio Recordings	
TZ 7241	2003-03	Limited Express (has gone?)	Feeds You!	
TZ 7242	2003-04	Adachi Tomomi Royal Chorus	Yo	
TZ 7243	2003-05	Yamamoto Seiichi	Nu Frequency	
TZ 7244	2003-05	Sachi Hayasaka	Minga	
TZ 7245	2003-11	Hoahio	Peek-Ara-Boo	
TZ 7246	2004-01	Ayuo/Ohta Hiromi	Red Moon	
TZ 7247	2004-01	Yoshida/Fujii	Erans	
TZ 7248	2004-04	Yamamoto Seiichi	Baptism	
TZ 7249	2004-05	Agata	Spike	
TZ 7250	2004-11	Yamataka Eye/John Zorn	Naninani II	
TZ 7251	2005-01	Radar	Easy Listening	
TZ 7252	2005-02	Mori Chieko	Jumping Rabbit	
TZ 7253	2005-02	Makigami Koichi	Koedarake	
TZ 7254	2005-03	Synapse	Raw	
TZ 7255	2005-03	Toshinori Kondo	Fukyo	
TZ 7256	2005-04	Merzbow	Sphere	
TZ 7257	2005-04	Korekyojinn	Isotope	
TZ 7258	2005-06	Afrirampo	Kore ga Mayaku Da	
TZ 7259	2005-09	Ni Hao!	Gorgeous	
TZ 7260	2005-11	Ayuo	Aoi	
TZ 7261	2006-01	Muddy World	Finery of the Storm	
TZ 7261b	2016-10	Muddy World	Finery of the Storm	2016 reissue
TZ 7262	2006-04	Haino Keiji/Yoshida Tatsuya	New Rap	
TZ 7263	2006-05	Otomo/Laswell/Yoshida	Episome	
TZ 7264	2007-05	Death Ambient	Drunken Forest	
TZ 7265	2008-05	Haino Keiji/Yoshida Tatsuya	Uhrfasudhasdd	
TZ 7266	2009-11	Sajjanu	Pechiku!!	
TZ 7267	2010-03	Ned Rothenberg	Ryu Nashi/No School-New Music for Shakuhachi	
TZ 7268	2010-05	Makigami Koichi	Tokyo Taiga	
TZ 7269	2011-07	Ni Hao!	Marvelous	
TZ 7270	2012-08	Uchihashi Kazuhisa And Yoshida Tatsuya	Barisshee	

=== 7300/8300/9300 series: Archival ===
Catalog number	Date released	Artist	Title	Notes
7300 series
TZ 7301	1995-09	John Zorn	Kristallnacht	reissue
TZ 7302	1995-09	John Zorn	Elegy	
TZ 7302	2011-11	John Zorn	Elegy	20th Anniversary Edition
TZ 7303	1997	John Zorn	Locus Solus	
TZ 7304	1995	John Zorn	First Recordings 1973	
TZ 7305	1996	John Zorn	The Classic Guide to Strategy	
TZ 7306	1996	John Zorn	Filmworks II: Music for an Untitled Film by Walter Hill	reissue (Toys Factory (Japan), 1995)
TZ 7307	1996	John Zorn	Filmworks V: Tears of Ecstasy	
TZ 7308	1996	John Zorn	Filmworks VI: 1996	
TZ 7309	1997	John Zorn	Filmworks III: 1990–1995	reissue (Toys Factory/Eva (Japan), 1995)
TZ 7310	1997	John Zorn	Filmworks IV: S/M + More	reissue (Eva (Japan), 1996)
TZ 7311	1997	John Zorn	New Traditions in East Asian Bar Bands	
TZ 7312-2	1997-02	Naked City	Black Box	2xCD
TZ 7312	2010-10	John Zorn	Naked City Black Box-20th Anniversary Edition: Torture Garden/Leng Tch'e	
TZ 7314	1997	John Zorn	Filmworks I	reissue of Filmworks 1986–1990 (Nonesuch, 1990)
TZ 7315	1997	John Zorn	Filmworks VII: Cynical Hysterie Hour	reissue of Cynical Hysterie Hour (CBS (Japan), 1989)
TZ 7316-7	1997	John Zorn	The Parachute Years: 1977–1980	compilation; 7xCD box set, game
TZ 73161-2	2000-01	John Zorn	Lacrosse	reissue; 2xCD box set, game
TZ 73162	2002-03	John Zorn	Hockey	reissue; game
TZ 73163	2000-06	John Zorn	Pool	reissue; game
TZ 73164-3	2001-01	John Zorn	Archery	3xCD box set, game
TZ 7317-4	1998	PainKiller	Painkiller Collected Works	4xCD box set
TZ 7318	1998	John Zorn	Filmworks VIII: 1997	
TZ 7319	1998-09	John Zorn	Ganryu Island	
TZ 7320	1998-09	John Zorn	The Bribe	
TZ 7321	1998-10	John Zorn	Music for Children	1998 release Out of Print
TZ 7321b	2009-08	John Zorn	Music for Children	10th anniversary edition
TZ 7322-2	1999-03	Masada	Live in Jerusalem 1994	live; 2xCD
TZ 7323-2	1998-10	Masada	Live in Taipei 1995	live; 2xCD
TZ 7324	1999-07	John Zorn	Godard/Spillane	
TZ 7325	1999-10	John Zorn	Taboo and Exile	
TZ 7326	1999-11	Masada	Live in Middleheim 1999	live
TZ 7327	2000-07	Masada	Live in Sevilla 2000	live
TZ 7328	2000-08	John Zorn	The Big Gundown	15th Anniversary Special Edition
TZ 7329	2000-09	John Zorn	Xu Feng	
TZ 7330-2	2000-11	John Zorn	Cartoon S/M	
TZ 7331	2000-12	John Zorn	Filmworks IX: Trembling Before G-d	
TZ 7332	2001-04	John Zorn	The Gift	
TZ 7333	2001-08	John Zorn	Filmworks X: In the Mirror of Maya Deren	
TZ 7334-2	2001-09	Masada	Live at Tonic 2001	live
TZ 7335	2002-03	John Zorn	Cobra	
TZ 7336	2002-05	Naked City	Naked City Live Vol. 1: Knitting Factory 1989	live
TZ 7337	2002-04	Masada	First Live 1993	
TZ 7338	2002-05	John Zorn	IAO	
TZ 7339	2002-07	John Zorn	Filmworks XI: Secret Lives	
TZ 7340	2002-08	John Zorn	Filmworks XII: Three Documentaries	
TZ 7341	2002-09	John Zorn	Filmworks XIII: Invitation to a Suicide	
TZ 7342	2002-11	PainKiller	Talisman	
TZ 7343	2003-07	John Zorn	Filmworks XIV: Hiding and Seeking	
TZ 7344-5	2005-03	Naked City	The Complete Studio Recordings	5xCD box set
TZ 7345	2005-02	John Zorn	Filmworks XV: Protocols of Zion	
TZ 7346-2	2005-05	Masada	Sanhedrin	
TZ 7347	2005-05	John Zorn	Filmworks XVI: Workingman's Death	
TZ 7348	2005-06	Jamie Saft Trio	Astaroth: Book of Angels Volume 1	subtitled Jamie Saft Trio Plays Masada Book Two
TZ 7349	2005-08	The Cracow Klezmer Band	The Cracow Klezmer Band Plays John Zorn Sanatorium Under the Sign of the Hourglass: A Tribute to Bruno Schultz	
TZ 7350	2005-09	John Zorn	Filmworks Anthology: 20 Years of Soundtrack Music	compilation of tracks from first 15 volumes of Filmworks
TZ 7351	2005-11	Masada String Trio	Azazel: Book of Angels Volume 2	
TZ 7352-2	2005-11	Electric Masada	At the Mountains of Madness	live; 2xCD
TZ 7353	2006-01	John Zorn	Filmworks XVII: Notes on Marie Menken/Ray Bandar: A Life with Skulls	
TZ 7354	2006-01	Mark Feldman & Sylvie Courvoisier	Malphas: Book of Angels Volume 3	
TZ 7355	2006-04	John Zorn	Filmworks XVIII: The Treatment	
TZ 7356	2006-05	Koby Israelite	Orobas: Book of Angels Volume 4	
TZ 7357	2006-05	John Zorn	Moonchild	
TZ 7358	2006-06	The Cracow Klezmer Band	Balan: Book of Angels Volume 5	
TZ 7359	2006-10	John Zorn	Astronome	
TZ 7360	2006-11	Uri Caine	Moloch: Book of Angels Volume 6	
TZ 7361	2007-03	John Zorn	Six Litanies for Heliogabalus	
TZ 7362	2007-06	Marc Ribot	Asmodeus: Book of Angels Volume 7	
TZ 7363	2007-09	Erik Friedlander	Volac: Book of Angels Volume 8	
TZ 7364	2008-05	Secret Chiefs 3	Xaphan: Book of Angels Volume 9	
TZ 7365	2008-01	John Zorn	Filmworks XIX: The Rain Horse	
TZ 7366	2008-03	John Zorn	The Dreamers	
TZ 7367	2008-03	Bar Kokhba Sextet	Lucifer: Book of Angels Volume 10	
TZ 7368	2008-08	Medeski, Martin and Wood	Zaebos: Book of Angels Volume 11	
TZ 7369	2008-09	John Zorn	Filmworks XX: Sholem Aleichem	
TZ 7370	2008-10	John Zorn	Filmworks XXI: Belle de Nature/The New Rijksmuseum	
TZ 7371	2008-11	John Zorn	Filmworks XXII: The Last Supper	
TZ 7372	2008-12	John Zorn	The Crucible	
TZ 7373	2009-02	John Zorn	Filmworks XXIII: El General	
TZ 7374	2009-05	John Zorn	Alhambra Love Songs	
TZ 7375	2009-06	Masada Quintet featuring Joe Lovano	Stolas: Book of Angels Volume 12	
TZ 7376	2009-07	John Zorn	O'o	
TZ 7377	2009-10	John Zorn	Femina	
TZ 7378	2010-01	Mycale	Mycale: Book of Angels Volume 13	
TZ 7379	2010-02	John Zorn	In Search of the Miraculous	
TZ 7380	2010-03	The Dreamers	Ipos: Book of Angels Volume 14	
TZ 7381	2010-05	Ben Goldberg Quartet	Baal: Book of Angels Volume 15	
TZ 7382	2010-05	John Zorn	Dictée/Liber Novus	
TZ 7383	2010-06	John Zorn	The Goddess: Music for the Ancient of Days	
TZ 7384	2010-07	Masada String Trio	Haborym: Book of Angels Volume 16	
TZ 7385	2010-08	John Zorn	Filmworks XXIV: The Nobel Prizewinner	
TZ 7386	2010-09	John Zorn	Ipsissimus	
TZ 7387	2010-11	John Zorn	Interzone	
TZ 7388	2011-01	Banquet of the Spirits	Caym: Book of Angels Volume 17	
TZ 7389	2011-04	John Zorn	Nova Express	
TZ 7390	2011-04	John Zorn	The Satyr's Play: Cerberus	
TZ 7391	2011-06	John Zorn	Enigmata	
TZ 7392	2011-09	John Zorn	At the Gates of Paradise	
TZ 7393	2011-10	John Zorn	A Dreamers Christmas	
TZ 7394	2012-01	John Zorn	Mount Analogue	
TZ 7395	2012-02	John Zorn	The Gnostic Preludes	
TZ 7396	2012-03	David Krakauer	Pruflas: Book of Angels Volume 18	
TZ 7397	2012-04	John Zorn	Nosferatu	
TZ 7398	2012-05	John Zorn	Templars: In Sacred Blood	
TZ 7399	2012-06	John Zorn	The Hermetic Organ	
8300 series
TZ 8301	2012-08	John Zorn	Rimbaud	
TZ 8302	2012-07	Shanir Ezra Blumenkranz	Abraxas: Book of Angels Volume 19	
TZ 8303	2012-09	John Zorn	A Vision in Blakelight	
TZ 8304	2012-11	John Zorn	The Concealed	
TZ 8305	2013-01	John Zorn	Filmworks XXV: City of Slaughter/Schmatta/Beyond the Infinite	
TZ 8306	2013-03	John Zorn	The Mysteries	
TZ 8307	2013-05	Pat Metheny	Tap: Book of Angels Volume 20	
TZ 8308	2013-07	John Zorn	Dreamachines	
TZ 8309	2013-12	John Zorn	In Lambeth: Visions from the Walled Garden of William Blake	
TZ 8310	2013-12	John Zorn	Shir Hashirim	
TZ 8311	2013-11	PainKiller	The Prophecy	
TZ 8312	2014-01	John Zorn	The Hermetic Organ, Volume 2: St. Paul's Chapel	
TZ 8313	2014-02	John Zorn	Psychomagia	
TZ 8314	2014-02	John Zorn	The Alchemist	
TZ 8315	2014-03	John Zorn	Fragmentations, Prayers and Interjections	
TZ 8316	2014-04	Eyvind Kang	Alastor: Book of Angels Volume 21	
TZ 8317	2014-05	John Zorn	In the Hall of Mirrors	
TZ 8318	2014-06	John Zorn	Myth and Mythopoeia	
TZ 8319	2014-07	Zion80	Adramelech: Book of Angels Volume 22	
TZ 8320	2014-07	John Zorn	On Leaves of Grass	
TZ 8321	2014-08	John Zorn	The Testament of Solomon	
TZ 8322	2014-09	Roberto Juan Rodríguez	Aguares: The Book of Angels Volume 23	
TZ 8323	2014-09	John Zorn	Valentine's Day	
TZ 8324	2014-10	John Zorn	Transmigration of the Magus	
TZ 8325	2014-11	John Zorn	The Last Judgment	
TZ 8326	2015-01	John Zorn	The Hermetic Organ, Volume 3: St. Paul's Hall, Huddersfield	
TZ 8327	2015-01	John Zorn	John Zorn's Olympiad, Vol. 1: Dither Plays Zorn	
TZ 8328	2015-02	Klezmerson	Amon: The Book of Angels Volume 24	
TZ 8329	2015-02	John Zorn	Hen to Pan	
TZ 8330	2015-03	John Zorn	Simulacrum	
TZ 8331	2015-04	John Zorn	The Song Project Live at le Poisson Rouge	
TZ 8332	2015-05	Mycale	Gomory: The Book of Angels Volume 25	
TZ 8333	2015-06	John Zorn	Pellucidar: A Dreamers Fantabula	
TZ 8334	2015-07	John Zorn	Forro Zinho: Forro in the Dark Plays Zorn	
TZ 8335	2015-08	John Zorn	The True Discoveries of Witches and Demons	
TZ 8336	2015-09	John Zorn	Inferno	
TZ 8337	2015-10	John Zorn	James Moore Plays the Book of Heads	
TZ 8338	2015-11	The Spike Orchestra	Cerberus: Book of Angels Volume 26	
TZ 8339	2016-01	John Zorn	Madrigals	
TZ 8340	2016-01	John Zorn	The Hermetic Organ, Volume 4: St. Bart's	
TZ 8341	2016-02	Flaga	Flaga: Book of Angels Volume 27	
TZ 8342	2016-03	John Zorn	The Painted Bird	
TZ 8343	2016-04	Nova Express Quintet	Andras: The Book of Angels Volume 28	
TZ 8344	2016-05	John Zorn	The Mockingbird	
TZ 8345	2016-07	John Zorn	Sacred Visions	
TZ 8346	2016-07	AutorYno	Flauros: The Book of Angels Volume 29	
TZ 8347	2016-08	John Zorn	Commedia dell'arte	
TZ 8348	2016-09	John Zorn	49 Acts of Unspeakable Depravity in the Abominable Life and Times of Gilles de Rais	
TZ 8349	2016-10	John Zorn	The Classic Guide to Strategy, Vol. 4	
TZ 8350	2017-01	Garth Knox and the Saltarello Trio	Leonard: The Book of Angels Volume 30	
TZ 8351	2017-02	John Zorn	The Garden of Earthly Delights	
TZ 8352	2017-03	John Zorn	There Is No More Firmament	
TZ 8353	2017-04	Brian Marsella	Buer: The Book of Angels Volume 31	
TZ 8354	2017-06	John Zorn	Midsummer Moons	
TZ 8355	2017-09	John Zorn	The Interpretation of Dreams	
TZ 8356	2017-10	Mary Halvorson Quartet	Paimon: The Book of Angels Volume 32	
TZ 8357	2017-11	John Zorn	The Hermetic Organ, Volume 5: Philharmonie De Paris	
TZ 8358	2018-01	John Zorn	The Urmuz Epigrams	
TZ 8359	2018-04	John Zorn	Insurrection	
TZ 8360	2018-06	John Zorn	In a Convex Mirror	
TZ 8361	2018-12	John Zorn	Salem, 1692	
TZ 8362	2019-03	John Zorn	The Hermetic Organ, Volume 6: For Edgar Allan Poe	
TZ 8363	2019-05	John Zorn	The Hierophant	
TZ 8364	2019-06	John Zorn	Nove cantici per Francesco d'Assisi	
TZ 8365	2019-07	John Zorn	Tractatus Musico-Philosophicus	
TZ 8366	2019-08	John Zorn	Encomia	
TZ 8367	2019-09	John Zorn	The Hermetic Organ, Volume 7: St. John the Divine 2013	
TZ 8368	2019-10	John Zorn	The Hermetic Organ, Volume 8: For Antonin Artaud	
TZ 8369	2020-01	John Zorn	Beyond Good and Evil—Simulacrum Live	
TZ 8370	2020-02	John Zorn	Virtue	
TZ 8371	2020-05	John Zorn	Calculus	
TZ 8372	2020-06	John Zorn	Baphomet	
TZ 8373	2020-07	John Zorn	Les Maudits	
TZ 8374	2020-08	John Zorn/Jesse Harris	Songs for Petra	
TZ 8375	2020-11	John Zorn	Azoth	
TZ 8376	2020-12	John Zorn	The Turner Etudes	
TZ 8377	2021-01	John Zorn	Gnosis: The Inner Light	
TZ 8378	2021-02	John Zorn	Heaven and Earth Magick	
TZ 8379	2021-03	John Zorn	Teresa de Avila	
TZ 8380	2021-04	John Zorn	Chaos Magick	
TZ 8381	2021-07	John Zorn	Parables	
TZ 8382	2021-08	John Zorn	Nostradamus: The Death of Satan	
TZ 8383	2021-09	John Zorn	Meditations on the Tarot	
TZ 8384	2021-11	John Zorn	New Masada Quartet	
TZ 8385	2021-11	John Zorn	The Ninth Circle	
TZ 8386	2022-05	John Zorn	A Garden of Forking Paths	
TZ 8387	2022-03	John Zorn	Perchance to Dream...	
TZ 8388	2022-04	John Zorn	Spinoza	
TZ 8389	2022-07	John Zorn	Suite for Piano	
TZ 8390	2022-07	John Zorn	John Zorn's Olympiad, Vol. 2: Fencing 1978	
TZ 8391	2022-11	John Zorn	The Hermetic Organ Volume 9: Liber VII	
TZ 8392	2022-09	John Zorn	Incerto	
TZ 8393	2022-10	John Zorn	Multiplicities: A Repository of Non-Existent Objects	
TZ 8394	2022-11	John Zorn	The Hermetic Organ Volume 10: Bozar, Brussels	
TZ 8395	2022-12	John Zorn	John Zorn's Olympiad, Vol. 3: Pops Plays Pops --Eugene Chadbourne Plays the Book of Heads	
TZ 8396	2023-03	John Zorn	New Masada Quartet, Volume Two	
TZ 8397	2023-03	John Zorn	The Fourth Way	
TZ 8398	2023-03	John Zorn	444	
TZ 8399	2023-04	John Zorn	Multiplicities II: A Repository of Nonexistent Objects	
9300 series
TZ 9301	2023-08	John Zorn	Full Fathom Five	
TZ 9302	2023-06	John Zorn	Quatrain	
TZ 9303	2023-10	John Zorn	Homenaje a Remedios Varo	
TZ 9304	2023-11	John Zorn	Nothing Is as Real as Nothing	
TZ 9305	2023-11	John Zorn	Parrhesiastes	
TZ 9306	2024-01	John Zorn	The Hermetic Organ Volume 11: For Terry Riley	
TZ 9307	2024-04	John Zorn	The Hermetic Organ Volume 12: The Bosch Requiem	
TZ 9308	2024-05	John Zorn/Jesse Harris	Love Songs Live	
TZ 9309	2024-06	John Zorn	Her Melodious Lay	
TZ 9310	2024-07	John Zorn	Ballades	
TZ 9311	2024-08	John Zorn	Hannigan Sings Zorn Volume One	
TZ 9312	2024-08	John Zorn	Lamentations	
TZ 9313	2024-08	John Zorn	The Hermetic Organ Volume 13: Biennale Musica Venezia	
TZ 9314	2024-09	John Zorn	Hannigan Sings Zorn Volume Two	
TZ 9315	2024-10	John Zorn	New Masada Quartet, Volume Three	
TZ 9316	2024-11	PainKiller	Samsara	
TZ 9317	2024-12	John Zorn	Ou Phrontis	
TZ 9318-2	2025-01	John Zorn	The Complete String Quartets	2xCD
TZ 9319	2025-02	PainKiller	The Equinox	
TZ 9320	2025-03	Chaos Magick	Through the Looking Glass	
TZ 9321	2025-04	PainKiller	The Great God Pan	
TZ 9322	2025-06	John Zorn	Impromptus	
TZ 9323	2025-06	John Zorn	Fantasma	
TZ 9324	2025-07	John Zorn and Dave Lombardo	Memories, Dreams, and Reflections	
TZ 9325	2025-09	John Zorn	Prolegomena	
TZ 9326	2025-10	John Zorn	Nocturnes	

=== 7400 series: Lunatic Fringe ===
Catalog number	Date released	Artist	Title	Notes
TZ 7401	1996	Rodd Keith	I Died Today	
TZ 7402	1997	Ken Butler	Voices of Anxious Objects	
TZ 7403	1998	Danny Cohen, Mike Boner, Horse Cock Kids	Self Indulgent Music	
TZ 7403b	2016-07	Danny Cohen, Mike Boner, Horse Cock Kids	Self Indulgent Music	2016 reissue
TZ 7404	1999	Dion McGregor	Dion McGregor Dreams Again	
TZ 7404b	2016-05	Dion McGregor	Dion McGregor Dreams Again	2016 reissue
TZ 7405	1999-09	Danny Cohen	Museum of Dannys	
TZ 7406	2004-01	Rodd Keith	Ecstacy to Frenzy	
TZ 7407	2004-02	Mike Pathos	People	
TZ 7408	2005-03	Mr. Dorgon	God Is Greatest	
TZ 7409	2005-11	Buckethead	Kaleidoscalp	
TZ 7410	2008-10	Brown Wing Overdrive	ESP Organism	
TZ 7411	2009-08	On Ka'a Davis	Djoukoujou!	
TZ 7412	2012-09	Kramer	The Brill Building	

=== 7500 series: Film Music ===
Catalog number	Date released	Artist	Title	Notes
TZ 7501	1996	Steve Beresford	Cue Sheets	
TZ 7502	1996	Peter Scherer	Cronologia	
TZ 7503	1997	Fred Frith	Eye to Ear	
TZ 7504	1997	Marc Ribot	Shoe String Symphonettes	
TZ 7505	1997	Elliott Sharp	Figure Ground	
TZ 7506	1997	Nana Vasconcelos	Fragments: Modern Tradition	
TZ 7507	1997	Frank London	The Debt	
TZ 7507b	2016-08	Frank London	The Debt	2016 reissue
TZ 7508	1998	Ikue Mori	B/Side	
TZ 7509	1998	Evan Lurie	How I Spent My Vacation	
TZ 7510	1998	Phillip Johnston	Music for Films	
TZ 7511	2001-09	Bill Laswell	Filmtracks 2000	
TZ 7512	2001-10	Elliott Sharp	Suspension of Disbelief	
TZ 7513	2002-01	Steve Beresford	Cue Sheets II	
TZ 7514	2002-09	Wayne Horvitz	Film Music 1998–2001	
TZ 7515	2003-08	Doug Wieselman	Dimly Lit: Collected Soundtracks 1996–2002	
TZ 7516	2003-09	Marc Ribot	Filmworks II	
TZ 7517	2004-01	Fred Frith	Eye to Ear II	
TZ 7518	2008-07	Trevor Dunn	Four Films	
TZ 7519	2009-04	Robert Burger	City of Strangers	
TZ 7520	2010-03	Jamie Saft	A Bag of Shells	
TZ 7521	2010-11	Fred Frith	Eye to Ear 3	
TZ 7522	2012-01	Zeena Parkins	Double Dupe Down	

=== 7600 series: Key ===
Catalog number	Date released	Artist	Title	Notes
TZ 7601	1998-10	Massacre	Funny Valentine	
TZ 7602-2	1999-05	Various artists	Hallelujah, Anyway: Remembering Tom Cora	2xCD
TZ 7603	2000-03	Derek Bailey/Jamaaladeen Tacuma/Calvin Weston	Mirakle	
TZ 7604	2000-04	Wadada Leo Smith	Golden Quartet	
TZ 7605	2001-06	Fred Frith	Clearing	
TZ 7606	2001-11	Massacre	Meltdown	
TZ 7607	2002-04	Derek Bailey	Ballads	
TZ 7608	2002-10	Cyro Baptista	Beat the Donkey	
TZ 7609-2	2003-11	Anton Fier	Dreamspeed/Blindlight (1992–1994)	2xCD
TZ 7609b-2	2016-02	Anton Fier	Dreamspeed/Blindlight (1992–1994)	2016 reissue
TZ 7610-4	2004-02	Wadada Leo Smith	Kabell Years 1971–1979	
TZ 7611-2	2003-03	Various artists	Irving Stone Memorial Concert	
TZ 7612	2005-08	Derek Bailey	Carpal Tunnel	
TZ 7613	2005-08	Misha Mengelberg	Senne Sing Song	
TZ 7614	2005-11	Cyro Baptista	Love the Donkey	
TZ 7615-2	2006-02	Ned Rothenberg	Solo Works-The Lumina Recordings	
TZ 7616-2	2006-04	Joseph Holbrooke Trio	The Moat Recordings	
TZ 7617	2006-11	Henry Kaiser / Charles K. Noyes / Sang Won Park	Invite the Spirit 2006	
TZ 7618	2007-02	Tony Oxley	The Advocate	
TZ 7618b	2016-07	Tony Oxley	The Advocate	2016 reissue
TZ 7619	2007-05	Massacre	Lonely Heart	
TZ 7620	2007-06	Derek Bailey	Standards	
TZ 7621	2007-07	Steve Coleman	Invisible Paths: First Scattering	
TZ 7622	2007-08	Kaiser/Noyes/Park	Invite the Spirit 1983	
TZ 7622b	2016-09	Kaiser/Noyes/Park	Invite the Spirit 1983	2016 reissue
TZ 7623	2007-08	Fred Frith / Evelyn Glennie	The Sugar Factory	
TZ 7624	2008-03	Cyro Baptista	Banquet of the Spirits	
TZ 7625	2008-07	Fred Frith	to Sail, to Sail	
TZ 7626	2008-08	Braxton, Graves, Parker	Beyond Quantum	
TZ 7627	2009-03	Guy Klucevsek	Dancing on the Volcano	
TZ 7628	2009-05	Wadada Leo Smith/Jack Dejohnette	America	
TZ 7629	2009-05	Ikue Mori	Class Insecta	
TZ 7630	2009-07	Cyro Baptista's Banquet of the Spirits	Infinito	
TZ 7631	2009-09	Anthony Coleman	Freakish	
TZ 7632	2009-11	Evan Parker	House Full of Floors	
TZ 7633	2010-01	Mark Feldman and Sylvie Courvoisier	Oblivia	
TZ 7634	2010-04	John Zorn/Fred Frith Duo	Late Works	
TZ 7635	2010-09	Jesse Harris	Cosmo	
TZ 7636	2011-08	Ikue Mori/Mark Nauseef/Evan Parker/Bill Laswell	Near Nadir	
TZ 7637	2011-09	Chris Cochrane/Dennis Cooper/Ishmael Houston-Jones	Them	
TZ 7638	2012-02	Shelley Hirsch / Simon Ho	Where Were You Then?	
TZ 7639	2012-03	Jon Raskin and Carla Harryman	Open Box	
TZ 7640	2012-06	Marilyn Crispell, Mark Dresser, Gerry Hemingway	Marilyn Crispell, Mark Dresser, Gerry Hemingway Play Braxton	
TZ 7641	2013-02	Bill Frisell	Silent Comedy	
TZ 7642	2013-04	Massacre	Love Me Tender	
TZ 7643	2013-09	John Zorn and Thurston Moore	"@"	
TZ 7644	2013-10	Marco Cappelli Acoustic Trio	Le Stagioni del Commissario Ricciardi	
TZ 7645	2013-11	Henry Kaiser	Requia and Other Improvisations for Guitar Solo	

=== 7700 series: Oracles ===
Catalog number	Date released	Artist	Title	Notes
TZ 7701	2001-06	Xtatika	Tongue Bath	
TZ 7702	2002-01	Susie Ibarra	Songbird Suite	
TZ 7703	2002-02	Yuka Honda	Memories Are My Only Witness	
TZ 7704	2002-03	Mephista	Black Narcissus	
TZ 7705	2002-11	Shelley Hirsch	The Far In, Far Out Worlds of Shelley Hirsch	
TZ 7706	2003-01	Carla Kihlstedt	Two Foot Yard	
TZ 7707	2003-06	Kitty Brazelton and Dafna Naphtali	What Is It Like to Be a Bat?	
TZ 7708	2003-10	Muna Zul	Muna Zul	
TZ 7709	2004-01	Jenny Scheinman	Shalagaster	
TZ 7710	2004-02	Red Pocket	Thick	
TZ 7711	2004-05	Mephista	Entomological Reflections	
TZ 7712	2004-09	Yuka Honda	Eucademix	
TZ 7713	2004-10	Lesli Dalaba	Timelines	
TZ 7714	2005-05	Ikue Mori	Myrninerest	
TZ 7715	2005-05	Okkyung Lee	Nihm	
TZ 7716	2006-06	Robin Holcomb	John Brown's Body	
TZ 7717	2007-04	Pamelia Kurstin	Thinking Out Loud	
TZ 7718	2008-05	Phantom Orchard	Orra	
TZ 7719	2009-10	Jessica Pavone	Songs of Synastry and Solitude	
TZ 7720	2009-10	Minamo	Kuroi Kawa~Black River	
TZ 7721	2009-11	Meredith Monk	Beginnings	
TZ 7722	2010-01	Yuka Honda	Heart Chamber Phantoms	
TZ 7723	2010-10	Maria Raducanu	Ziori	
TZ 7724	2011-03	Okkyung Lee	Noisy Love Songs	
TZ 7725	2011-09	Theresa Wong	The Unlearning	
TZ 7726	2012-04	High Duchess	Wanderlust	
TZ 7727	2012-06	Jessica Pavone	Hope Dawson Is Missing	
TZ 7728	2012-11	Phantom Orchard Orchestra	Trouble in Paradise	
TZ 7729	2013-10	Suphala	Alien Ancestry	

=== 7800 series: Spotlight ===
Catalog number	Date released	Artist	Title	Notes
TZ 7801	2011-05	Les Rhinocéros	Les Rhinocéros	
TZ 7802	2011-06	Pet Bottle Ningen	Pet Bottle Ningen	
TZ 7803	2011-07	Aram Bajakian's Kef	Aram Bajakian's Kef	
TZ 7804	2012-03	Guillaume Perret & the Electric Epic	Guillaume Perret & the Electric Epic	
TZ 7805	2012-04	Many Arms	Many Arms	
TZ 7806	2013-03	Pet Bottle Ningen	Non-Recyclable	
TZ 7807	2013-05	Guerilla Toss	Guerilla Toss	
TZ 7808	2013-05	Les Rhinocéros	Les Rhinocéros II	
TZ 7809	2014-04	Many Arms	Suspended Definition	
TZ 7810	2014-08	The Suite Unraveling	The Suite Unraveling	
TZ 7811	2015-01	Hypercolor	Hypercolor	
TZ 7812	2015-06	Les Rhinocéros	Les Rhinocéros III	
TZ 7813	2015-07	Bret Higgins' Atlas Revolt	Bret Higgins' Atlas Revolt	
TZ 7814	2016-08	Unnatural Ways	We Aliens	
TZ 7815	2017-06	Burning Ghosts	Reclamation	
TZ 7816	2017-08	Shardik	Shardik	
TZ 7817	2020-05	Witch 'n' Monk	Witch 'n' Monk	
TZ 7818	2020-09	Wyxz	Odyx	
TZ 7819	2020-11	Red Fiction	Visions of the Void	

=== 0000 series: Special Edition ===
The Special Edition series consists of live limited edition fundraiser albums, namely a Hemophiliac album and The Stone Benefit series.

Catalog number	Date released	Artist	Title	Notes
TZ 0001	2002-06	Hemophiliac	Hemophiliac	2xCD; live; limited edition
TZ 0002	2006-02	John Zorn, Dave Douglas, Rob Burger, Bill Laswell, Mike Patton, Ben Perowsky	The Stone: Issue One	live; limited edition
TZ 0003	2007-03	Fred Frith, Chris Cutler	The Stone: Issue Two	live; limited edition
TZ 0004	2008-04	Lou Reed, Laurie Anderson, John Zorn	The Stone: Issue Three	live; limited edition
TZ 0005	2010-11	Medeski, Martin and Wood	The Stone: Issue Four	live; limited edition

=== 4000 series: Spectrum ===
Catalog number	Date released	Artist	Title	Notes
TZ 4001	2014-06	Wadada Leo Smith, George Lewis, John Zorn	Sonic Rivers	
TZ 4002	2014-06	Sylvie Courvoisier	Double Windsor	
TZ 4003	2014-06	Phantom Orchard Ensemble	Through the Looking-Glass	
TZ 4004	2014-09	David Smith, Bill Laswell, John Zorn	The Dream Membrane	
TZ 4005	2014-10	Wollesen - Haffner - Naujo	Rasa Rasa	
TZ 4006	2014-11	Karl Berger	Gently Unfamiliar	
TZ 4007	2015-02	Ikue Mori	In Light of Shadows	
TZ 4008	2015-03	Per Bloland	Chamber Industrial	
TZ 4009	2015-04	David Rosenboom	Naked Curvature	
TZ 4010	2015-08	Blue Buddha	Blue Buddha	
TZ 4011	2015-09	John Schott	Actual Trio	
TZ 4012	2015-10	Larry Ochs	The Fictive Five	
TZ 4013	2015-11	Daniel Zamir	Redemption Songs	
TZ 4014	2016-03	Cyro Baptista	BlueFly	
TZ 4015	2016-06	Robert Dick	Our Cells Know	
TZ 4016	2016-11	Shane Parish	Undertaker Please Drive Slow	
TZ 4017	2017-05	Craig Taborn and Ikue Mori	Highsmith	
TZ 4018	2017-07	Ikue Mori	Obelisk	
TZ 4019	2017-11	Connie Converse	Vanity of Vanities: A Tribute to Connie Converse	
TZ 4020	2017-12	Kramer	The Brill Building, Book Two Featuring Bill Frisell	
TZ 4021	2018-02	Scott Johnson	Mind Out of Matter	
TZ 4022	2018-03	Karl Berger	In a Moment: Music for Piano And Strings	
TZ 4023	2018-05	Okkyung Lee	Cheol-Kkot-Sae (Steel.Flower.Bird)	
TZ 4024	2018-07	Mary Halvorson	The Maid with the Flaxen Hair: A Tribute to Johnny Smith	
TZ 4025	2018-08	Winged Serpents	Six Encomiums for Cecil Taylor	
TZ 4026	2018-09	Brian Marsella Trio	Outspoken: The Music of the Legendary Hasaan	
TZ 4027	2018-10	Wendy Eisenberg	The Machinic Unconscious	
TZ 4028	2019-04	Trevor Dunn	Nocturnes	
TZ 4029	2020-03	Brian Marsella	Gatos do Sul	
TZ 4030-2	2020-04	David Hertzberg	The Wake World	2xCD
TZ 4031	2020-06	Spike Orchestra	Splintered Stories	
TZ 4032	2020-10	I.P.Y.	IPY	
TZ 4033	2021-05	Ikue Mori—Brian Marsella—Sae Hashimoto	Archipelago X	
TZ 4034	2021-06	Gyan Riley	Silver Lining	
TZ 4035	2021-08	John Medeski	Crawlspace	
TZ 4036	2021-10	Miles Okazaki, Trevor Dunn, Dan Weiss	Hive Mind	
TZ 4037	2022-01	John Zorn, Bill Laswell	The Cleansing	
TZ 4038	2022-03	Zoh Amba	O, Sun	
TZ 4039	2022-05	Charming Hostess	The Ginzburg Geography	
TZ 4040	2022-06	Ikue Mori	Tracing the Magic	
TZ 4041	2022-09	Titan to Tachyons	Vonals	
TZ 4042	2023-05	John Zorn, Bill Laswell	Memoria	
TZ 4043	2023-11	Anna Webber and Matt Mitchell	Capacious Aeration	
TZ 4044	2023-12	Terton	Outer, Inner, Secret	
TZ 4045	2024-02	Simon Hanes	Tsons of Tsunami	
TZ 4046	2024-02	Sean Ono Lennon	Asterisms	CD
TZ 4047	2024-03	Phantom Orchard	Hit Parade of Tears	
TZ 4048	2024-05	On Ka'a Davis	...Here's to Another Day and Night for the Lwa of the Woke	
TZ 4049	2024-06	Mark Dresser	In the Shadow of a Mad King	
TZ 4050	2024-09	Frank London	Brass Conspiracy	
TZ 4051	2024-09	Dougie Bowne	The Stars Are Indispensable	
TZ 4052-3	2024-10	Brian Marsella's iMAGiNARiUM	Medietas	3xCD box set
TZ 4053	2025-02	Ikue Mori	Of Ghosts and Goblins	
TZ 4054	2025-03	Ches Smith	The Self	
TZ 4055	2025-07	Shardik	Cruelty Bacchanal	
TZ 4056	2025-08	Joseph Holbrooke	Last Live 2001—In Memoriam Derek Bailey and Tony Oxley	live
TZ 4057	2025-08	Zeena Parkins	Modesty of the Magic Thing	
TZ 4058	2025-11	Alchemical Theatre	Alchemical Theatre	

=== 5000/5100/5200 series: Birthday Celebration ===
Catalog number	Date released	Artist	Title	Notes
5000 series: 50th Birthday Celebration
TZ 5001	2004-02	Masada String Trio	50th Birthday Celebration Volume One	live
TZ 5002	2004-03	Milford Graves & John Zorn	50th Birthday Celebration Volume Two	live
TZ 5003	2004-04	Locus Solus	50th Birthday Celebration Volume Three	live; Anton Fier, Arto Lindsay and John Zorn; see also Locus Solus (Rift, 1983)
TZ 5004	2004-05	Electric Masada	50th Birthday Celebration Volume Four	live
TZ 5005	2004-07	Fred Frith & John Zorn	50th Birthday Celebration Volume Five	live
TZ 5006	2004-08-24	Hemophiliac	50th Birthday Celebration Volume Six	live
TZ 5007	2004-09-21	Masada	50th Birthday Celebration Volume Seven	live
TZ 5008	2004-10	Smith/Ibarra/Zorn	50th Birthday Celebration Volume Eight	live
TZ 5009	2004-11	John Zorn	50th Birthday Celebration Volume Nine: The Classic Guide to Strategy Volume Three	live
TZ 5010	2005-01	Yamataka Eye/John Zorn	50th Birthday Celebration Volume Ten	live
TZ 5011-3	2005-08	Bar Kokhba Sextet	50th Birthday Celebration Volume Eleven	live; 3xCD box set
TZ 5012	2005-09	PainKiller	50th Birthday Celebration Volume Twelve	live
5100 series: The Book Beri'ah
TZ 5100	2018-08-17	Various artists	The Book Beri'ah	11xCD box set
TZ 5101	2019-01	Sofía Rei and JC Maillard	The Book Beri'ah Vol 1: Keter	
TZ 5102	2019-02	Cleric	The Book Beri'ah Vol 2: Chokhma	
TZ 5103	2019-03	Spike Orchestra	The Book Beri'ah Vol 3: Binah	
TZ 5104	2019-04	Julian Lage and Gyan Riley	The Book Beri'ah Vol 4: Chesed	
TZ 5105	2019-05	Abraxas	The Book Beri'ah Vol 5: Gevurah	
TZ 5106	2019-06	Klezmerson	The Book Beri'ah Vol 6: Tiferet	
TZ 5107	2019-07	Gnostic Trio	The Book Beri'ah Vol 7: Netzach	
TZ 5108	2019-08	Zion 80	The Book Beri'ah Vol 8: Hod	
TZ 5109	2019-09	Banquet of the Spirits	The Book Beri'ah Vol 9: Yesod	
TZ 5110	2019-10	Secret Chiefs 3	The Book Beri'ah Vol 10: Malkhut	
TZ 5111	2019-11	Craig Taborn and Vadim Neselovskyi	The Book Beri'ah Vol 11: Da'at	
5200 series: John Zorn's Bagatelles
TZ 5211	2025-01	Mary Halvorson Quartet	John Zorn's Bagatelles, Vol. 1	also released as John Zorn's Bagatelles (2021, 4xCD box set)
TZ 5212	2025-02	Erik Friedlander and Michael Nicolas	John Zorn's Bagatelles, Vol. 2	also released as John Zorn's Bagatelles (2021, 4xCD box set)
TZ 5213	2025-03	Trigger	John Zorn's Bagatelles, Vol. 3	also released as John Zorn's Bagatelles (2021, 4xCD box set)
TZ 5214	2025-04	Ikue Mori	John Zorn's Bagatelles, Vol. 4	also released as John Zorn's Bagatelles (2021, 4xCD box set)
TZ 5221	N/A	Kris Davis Quartet	John Zorn's Bagatelles, Vol. 5	released as John Zorn's Bagatelles (Vol. 5–8) (2021, 4xCD box set)
TZ 5222	N/A	Brian Marsella Trio	John Zorn's Bagatelles, Vol. 6	released as John Zorn's Bagatelles (Vol. 5–8) (2021, 4xCD box set)
TZ 5223	N/A	Brian Marsella	John Zorn's Bagatelles, Vol. 7	released as John Zorn's Bagatelles (Vol. 5–8) (2021, 4xCD box set)
TZ 5224	N/A	John Medeski Trio	John Zorn's Bagatelles, Vol. 8	released as John Zorn's Bagatelles (Vol. 5–8) (2021, 4xCD box set)
TZ 5231	N/A	Asmodeus	John Zorn's Bagatelles, Vol. 9	released as John Zorn's Bagatelles (Vol. 9–12) (2022, 4xCD box set)
TZ 5232	N/A	Julian Lage and Gyan Riley	John Zorn's Bagatelles, Vol. 10	released as John Zorn's Bagatelles (Vol. 9–12) (2022, 4xCD box set)
TZ 5233	N/A	Jim Black Quartet	John Zorn's Bagatelles, Vol. 11	released as John Zorn's Bagatelles (Vol. 9–12) (2022, 4xCD box set)
TZ 5234	N/A	Cleric	John Zorn's Bagatelles, Vol. 12	released as John Zorn's Bagatelles (Vol. 9–12) (2022, 4xCD box set)
TZ 5241	N/A	Speed Irabagon Quartet	John Zorn's Bagatelles, Vol. 13	released as John Zorn's Bagatelles (Vol. 13–16) (2023, 4xCD box set)
TZ 5242	N/A	Peter Evans	John Zorn's Bagatelles, Vol. 14	released as John Zorn's Bagatelles (Vol. 13–16) (2023, 4xCD box set)
TZ 5243	N/A	Ben Goldberg 4	John Zorn's Bagatelles, Vol. 15	released as John Zorn's Bagatelles (Vol. 13–16) (2023, 4xCD box set)
TZ 5244	N/A	Sam Eastmond	John Zorn's Bagatelles, Vol. 16	released as John Zorn's Bagatelles (Vol. 13–16) (2023, 4xCD box set)

=== 6000 series: (Limited Edition) Vinyl ===
The 6000 series consists of limited edition picture discs.

Catalog number	Date released	Artist	Title	Notes
TZ 6001	2010-11	John Zorn's the Dreamers	The Gentle Side	limited edition picture disc
TZ 6002	2011-10	John Zorn's the Dreamers	A Dreamers Christmas	limited edition picture disc
TZ 6003	2011-10	John Zorn's the Dreamers Featuring Mike Patton	The Christmas Song/Santa's Workshop	limited edition picture disc
TZ 6004	2014-11	John Zorn	The Song Project Vinyl Singles Edition	limited edition picture disc
TZ 6006	2019-05	John Zorn	Pellucidar: A Dreamers Fantabula	limited edition picture disc
TZ 6011	2021-01	John Zorn/Jesse Harris	Songs for Petra	limited edition picture disc
TZ 6012	2024-03	Sean Ono Lennon	Asterisms	limited edition picture disc

== Filmography ==
=== 3000 series: DVD Edition ===
The 3000 series, Tzadik DVD Series, consists of documentaries and live performances of Tzadik artists

Catalog number	Date released	Artist	Title	Notes
TZ 3001	2004-03	Claudia Heuermann	A Bookshelf on Top of the Sky: 12 Stories About John Zorn	documentary
TZ 3002	2004-03	Pierre Hébert/Bob Ostertag	Between Science and Garbage	live
TZ 3003	2004-11	Antonio Ferrera	Masada Live at Tonic 1999	live
TZ 3004	2005-11	Ken Jacobs	Celestial Subway Lines/Salvaging Noise	
TZ 3005	2007-02	Claudia Heuermann	Sabbath in Paradise	
TZ 3006	2007-04	Ken Jacobs	New York Ghetto Fishmarket 1903	
TZ 3007	2007-06	Ikue Mori	Bhima Swarga–The Journey of the Soul from Hell to Heaven	
TZ 3008	2009-02	Richard Foreman	Sophia:The Cliffs/35+ Year Retrospective Compilation	
TZ 3009	2009-05	Henry Hills	Selected Films 1977-2008	
TZ 3010	2010-07	John Zorn/Richard Foreman/Henry Hills	Astronome: A Night at the Opera	
TZ 3011	2011-02	Ikue Mori	Kibyoshi	
TZ 3012	2012-11	John Zorn	John Zorn's Treatment for a Film in Fifteen Scenes	
TZ 3013	2013-04	Raz Mesinai	Tunnel Vision	
TZ 3014	2013-10	Meredith Monk	Solo Concert 1980	

== Bibliography ==
Catalog number	Date released	Author	Title	Notes
#B001	2001-09	John Zorn	Arcana I	
#B002	2007-09	John Zorn	Arcana II	
#B003	2008-10	John Zorn	Arcana III	
#B004	2009-09	John Zorn	Arcana IV	
#B005	2010-06	John Zorn	Arcana V: Musicians on Music, Magic & Mysticism	
#B006	2011-04	J. Hoberman	On Jack Smith's Flaming Creatures (and other Secret-Flix of Cinemaroc)	
#B007	2012-08	John Zorn	Arcana VI	
#B008	2014-09	John Zorn	Arcana VII	
#B009	2017-09	John Zorn	Arcana VIII: Musicians on Music	Ten Year Anniversary Edition
#B010	2021-02	John Zorn	Arcana IX	
#B011	2022-02	John Zorn	Arcana X	

== Merchandise ==
Catalog number	Date released	Artist	Title	Notes
T-shirts
#T001	2003-07	Tzadik	IAO Black T-Shirt	
#T002	2002-10	Tzadik	The Gift Black T-Shirt	
#T003	2006-06	Tzadik	Moonchild T-Shirt	
#T004	2007-02	Tzadik	Astronome T-shirt	
#T005	2008-03	Tzadik	Dreamers Tee	
#T006	2015-10	Tzadik	Witches T-Shirt	
#T007	2015-10	Tzadik	Inferno T-Shirt	
Metal pins
#M001	2016-08	Heung-Heung Chin	Chippy Charmers Set One	
#M002	2016-08	Heung-Heung Chin	Chippy Charmers Set Two	
#M003	2016-08	Heung-Heung Chin	Chippy Charmers Set: Both Sets	
