= Adramelech: Book of Angels Volume 22 =

Studio album by Jon Madof's Zion80
- Released: July 22, 2014
- Recorded: May 2014
- Studios: Orange Studios, NJ and Highland Studios, White Plains, NY
- Genres: Jazz, klezmer, afrobeat
- Length: 56:22
- Label: Tzadik TZ 8319
- Producer: Jon Madof

Jon Madof chronology
Zion80 (2013)	Adramelech: Book of Angels Volume 22 (2014)

Book of Angels chronology
Alastor: Book of Angels Volume 21 (2014)	Adramelech: Book of Angels Volume 22 (2014)	Aguares: Book of Angels Volume 23 (2014)

Adramelech: Book of Angels Volume 22 is the second album by Zion80, a musical ensemble led by guitarist Jon Madof, which was released in 2014 on John Zorn's Tzadik Records. It is part of the Zorn's Book of Angels Series, a songbook of Zorn compositions performed by a wide range of performers.

== Reception ==
Professional ratings
Review scores
Source	Rating
PopMatters	8/10 stars

PopMatters' writer Sean Murphy stated "this is not merely a more-is-more celebration of Zorn with Madof at the helm. Rather, it taps into what is most special—and rewarding—about the Radical Jewish Culture that Zorn has been curating at his Tzadik label: music that spans time (we’re talking centuries) and crosses cultures, yet somehow, in ways that are both delirious and delightful, is totally of the here and now. It’s cutting edge history, made by musicians who know and respect tradition, but are dissatisfied with labels and the limitations of genre. ...There’s nothing not to recommend about this release, it is further evidence that virtually everything Madof touches turns to sonic gold. The album is stellar from start to finish but picks up steam as it goes along."

== Track listing ==
All compositions by John Zorn.

1. "Araziel" – 7:15
2. "Sheviel" – 5:49
3. "Metatron" – 9:06
4. "Shamdan" – 7:17
5. "Kenunit" – 10:37
6. "Caila" – 4:22
7. "Lelahiah" – 6:01
8. "Nehinah" – 5:56

== Personnel ==
- Jon Madof – guitar
- Frank London – trumpet
- Matt Darriau – alto saxophone, kaval, clarinet
- Greg Wall – tenor saxophone
- Jessica Lurie – baritone saxophone, flute
- Zach Mayer – baritone saxophone
- Brian Marsella – keyboards
- Yoshie Fruchter – guitar
- Shanir Ezra Blumenkranz – bass
- Marlon Sobol – percussion
- Yuval Lion – drums
- Mauro Refosco – percussion (track 7)
