= Matthew Welch =

American bagpiper and composer (born 1976)

Matthew Welch (born 1976) is an American bagpiper and composer.

Welch took a bachelor's in music at Simon Fraser University in Canada and then enrolled at Wesleyan University, where he studied under Anthony Braxton and Alvin Lucier. He has released several CD albums and composed pieces both for bagpipe and for more traditional ensembles, exploring elements of free jazz and experimental music.

== Discography ==
- Ceol Nua (Leo, 2002)
- Hag at the Churn (Newsonic, 2003)
- Dream Tigers (Tzadik, 2005)
- Luminosity (Porter, 2009)
- Blarvuster (Tzadik, 2010)
