= Rituals (John Zorn album) =

2005 contemporary classical album

Studio album by John Zorn
- Released: February 22, 2005
- Recorded: October 2004
- Genre: Avant-garde, Contemporary classical music
- Length: 26:36
- Label: Tzadik TZ 8011
- Producer: John Zorn

John Zorn chronology
50th Birthday Celebration Volume 10 (2005)	Rituals (2005)	Filmworks XV: Protocols of Zion (2005)

Rituals is an album of contemporary classical music by American avant-garde composer John Zorn. The piece takes the form of an opera in five parts and was premiered at the Bayreuth Opera Festival in 1998.

== Reception ==
Professional ratings
Review scores
Source	Rating
Allmusic	3.5/5 stars
Pitchfork Media	7.5/10

The Allmusic review by Dan Warburton awarded the album 3½ stars stating "It's a well-crafted work, superbly performed".

Writing for Pitchfork Media, Matthew Murphy stated "for established Zorn enthusiasts, Rituals is replete with moments to confound, enrich and delight, and will surely lure you to its darkened altar for frequent repeat ceremonies".

== Track listing ==
All compositions by John Zorn.

1. "I" - 4:48
2. "II" - 7:45
3. "III" - 4:21
4. "IV" - 5:21
5. "V" - 4:19

== Personnel ==
- Jennifer Choi – violin
- Fred Sherry – cello
- Tara O'Connor – flute, alto flute, piccolo
- Michael Lowenstern – clarinet, bass clarinet, E-flat clarinet
- Peter Kolkay – bassoon, contrabassoon
- Jim Pugh – trombone
- Stephen Drury – piano, harpsichord, celeste, organ
- Kurt Muroki – bass
- Jim Pugliese – percussion, wind machines, water, bullroarers, gravedigging, fishing reels, paper, bowls of BBs, bird calls
- William Winant – percussion
- Heather Gardner – voice
- Brad Lubman – conductor

=== Production ===
- Produced by: John Zorn
- Mastered by: George Marino at Sterling Sound, NYC
