= Alastor: Book of Angels Volume 21 =

Studio album by Eyvind Kang
- Released: April 29, 2014
- Recorded: 2014
- Studios: Avast, Seattle and Eastside Sound, NYC
- Genres: Jazz, klezmer, contemporary classical music
- Length: 44:46
- Label: Tzadik TZ 8316
- Producers: Eyvind Kang and Randall Dunn

Eyvind Kang chronology
Grass (2012)	Alastor: Book of Angels Volume 21 (2014)

Book of Angels chronology
Tap: Book of Angels Volume 20 (2014)	Alastor: Book of Angels Volume 21 (2014)	Adramelech: Book of Angels Volume 22 (2014)

Alastor: Book of Angels Volume 21 is an album by violist and multi-instrumentalist Eyvind Kang which was released in 2014 on John Zorn's Tzadik Records as part of Zorn's Book of Angels Series.

== Reception ==
Alarm reviewer Scott Morrow stated "Though Kang generally skews towards classical, chamber, and ambient, his take on Zorn’s hand-picked selections is a surprising and gorgeous collision of styles."

== Track listing ==
All compositions by John Zorn.

1. "Hakem" - 5:37
2. "Samchia" - 3:49
3. "Hakha" - 3:18
4. "Jetrel" - 5:32
5. "Variel" - 4:12
6. "Loquel" - 3:15
7. "Rachiel" - 3:49
8. "Barael" - 3:22
9. "Sakriel" - 7:08
10. "Uriron" - 4:42

== Personnel ==
- Eyvind Kang - electric bass, guitars, janggu, kacapi, kamancheh, Korg synthesizer, Moog synthesizer, oud, percussion, piano, setar, sitar, viola, violin, voice
- Skerik - tenor saxophone
- Hans Teuber - clarinets, flutes, tenor saxophone
- Cuong Vu - trumpet
- Emma Ashbrook - bassoon
- Josiah Boothby - French horn
- Taina Karr - English horn, oboe
- Randall Dunn - Moog synthesizer, voice
- Hidayat Honari - tar
- Maria Scherer Wilson, William Smith - cello
- Soyeon Park - geomungo
- JungAh Song - gayageum
- Shahzad Ismaily, Moriah Neils, Jacob Yackshaw - bass
- Dave Abramson - drums, percussion
- Tor Dietrichson - bongos, congas, clave, guiro, tabla, triangle
- Hyeonhee Park - janggu, kkwaenggwari
- Maya Dunietz, Jessika Kenney - voice
