= Zion80 =

Studio album by Jon Madof's Zion80
- Released: April 2013
- Recorded: December 20, 2012 at Orange Music, NJ
- Genre: Jazz, klezmer, Afrobeat
- Length: 61:35
- Label: Tzadik TZ 8175
- Producer: Jon Madof

Jon Madof chronology
The Gathering (2009)	Zion80 (2013)	Adramelech: Book of Angels Volume 22 (2014)

Zion80 is the debut album by guitarist Jon Madof's Zion80 which was released in 2013 on John Zorn's Tzadik Records as part the Radical Jewish Culture series. The album combines music written by Shlomo Carlebach performed in the Afrobeat style of Fela Kuti.

== Background ==
Madof has said "The initial idea for Zion80 came to me rather spontaneously in 2011 after I had been listening for several hours to Fela Kuti’s music. I was getting ready to take my kids to shul (synagogue) on Shabbat morning and started humming a song by Shlomo Carlebach. The drum patterns of Fela’s music were still in my head from the day before, and the light bulb went off!"

After assembling a group of musicians based on Kuti's Afrika '70 ensemble, Madof developed the material through open rehearsals and performances at The Stone every Monday night during a three-month residency that began in August 2012 before recording the album.

== Reception ==
PopMatters' writer Sean Murphy stated "The disc is a triple-threat: an ideal introduction to Zion80 as swell as Kuti and Carlebach (both of whom will reward interested listeners). Where Kuti’s legendary jams are sprawling, sometimes exhausting affairs, Madof’s arrangements are tight and accessible. Every player gets a chance to shine, and the full range of instruments is ably represented throughout"

== Track listing ==
All compositions by Shlomo Carlebach except as indicated

1. "Ein K'Elokeinu" - 4:50
2. "Tov L'Hodot" - 8:14
3. "Asher Bara" - 7:37
4. "Holy Brother" (Jon Madof) - 5:35
5. "Yehi Shalom" - 8:31
6. "Pischu Li" - 7:57
7. "Nygun" - 7:22
8. "Dovid Melech" - 6:24
9. "Nygun (Reprise)" - 4:57

== Personnel ==
- Jon Madof, Yoshie Fruchter, Aram Bajakian – guitar
- Frank London – trumpet
- Matt Darriau – alto saxophone
- Greg Wall – tenor saxophone
- Jessica Lurie – baritone saxophone, flute
- Zach Mayer – baritone saxophone
- Brian Marsella – keyboards
- Shanir Ezra Blumenkranz – bass
- Marlon Sobol – congas, percussion
- Rich Stein - percussion
- Cyro Baptista - percussion (tracks 3, 6 & 9)
