= Filmworks XVII: Notes on Marie Menken/Ray Bandar: A Life with Skulls =

Soundtrack album by John Zorn
- Released: 2006
- Genre: avant-garde, jazz, classical
- Length: 57:18
- Label: Tzadik TZ 7535
- Producer: John Zorn

John Zorn's Filmworks chronology
Filmworks XVI: Workingman's Death (2005)	Filmworks XVII: Notes on Marie Menken/Ray Bandar: A Life with Skulls (2006)	Filmworks XVIII: The Treatment (2006)

John Zorn chronology
Malphas: Book of Angels Volume 3 (2006)	Filmworks XVII: Notes on Marie Menken/Ray Bandar: A Life with Skulls (2005)	Filmworks XVIII: The Treatment (2006)

Filmworks XVII: Notes on Marie Menken/Ray Bandar: A Life with Skulls features scores by John Zorn for two documentary films. The album was released on Zorn's own label, Tzadik Records, in 2006 and contains music that Zorn wrote and recorded for, Notes on Marie Menken (2006), directed by Martina Kudláček and a percussion score for Ray Bandar: A Life with Skulls directed by Beth Cataldo.

== Reception ==
The Allmusic review by Thom Jurek awarded the album 4 stars stating "it goes through a whirling, dizzying, surreal journey in adventure, exotica, and interior travel. Highly recommended".

Professional ratings
Review scores
Source	Rating
Allmusic	4/5 stars

== Track listing ==
1. "Menken" - 5:26
2. "Skull I" - 4:04
3. "Glimpses" - 6:37
4. "Mood Mondrian" - 4:31
5. "Skull II" - 3:31
6. "Gogogo" - 8:14
7. "Moonplay" - 4:42
8. "Skull III" - 3:02
9. "Tango Exotique" -5:04
10. "Zenscapes" - 1:09
11. "Skull IV" - 1:41
12. "Arabesque" - 5:10
13. "Skull V" - 2:23
14. "Bolex Dancing" - 1:37

All music by John Zorn

- Produced by John Zorn.

== Personnel ==
- John Zorn - Wurlitzer piano, African thumb pianos, alto sax (track 6)
- Shanir Ezra Blumenkranz - bass
- Jon Madof - guitar
- Cyro Baptista - percussion
- Kenny Wollesen - drums, percussion
