= Filmworks XV: Protocols of Zion =

Soundtrack album by John Zorn
- Released: 2005
- Recorded: October 2004
- Genre: Avant-garde, jazz, classical
- Length: 45:57
- Label: Tzadik TZ 7345
- Producer: John Zorn

Filmworks chronology
Filmworks XIV: Hiding and Seeking (2003)	Filmworks XV: Protocols of Zion (2005)	Filmworks XVI: Workingman's Death (2005)

John Zorn chronology
Rituals (2005)	Filmworks XV: Protocols of Zion (2005)	Naked City: The Complete Studio Recordings (2005)

Filmworks XV: Protocols of Zion features a score by John Zorn for a documentary film by Marc Levin. The album was released on Zorn's own label, Tzadik Records, in 2005 and contains music that Zorn wrote and recorded for Protocols of Zion (2005), a documentary detailing the rise of antisemitism following the September 11 attacks.

== Reception ==
The Allmusic review by Thom Jurek awarded the album 4 stars stating "this is a provocative record for all the ease of listening it affords. It's a John Zorn who is not heard nearly often enough. This music is adventurous but contains no edges; it is deeply emotional, wonderfully warm, and utterly engaging".

Professional ratings
Review scores
Source	Rating
Allmusic	4/5 stars

== Track listing ==
1. "Protocols of Zion" - 4:27
2. "Searching For a Past" - 5:22
3. "Jew Watcher" - 2:43
4. "Mystery of the Jew" - 4:09
5. "History Repeats Itself" - 2:14
6. "Arab and Jew" - 5:57
7. "Fighting Time" - 5:02
8. "Hollywood/Rikers" - 2:36
9. "Elders of Zion" - 5:26
10. "A Dark Future" - 4:31
11. "Transition 1" - 0:31
12. "Transition 2" - 0:17
13. "Transition 3" - 0:30
14. "Transition 4" - 0:25
15. "Coda - The Metaphysics of Anti-Semitism" - 1:46

All music by John Zorn

- Recorded at Frank Booth, Brooklyn (New York) in October 2004.
- Produced by John Zorn.

== Personnel ==
- John Zorn – electric pianos
- Shanir Ezra Blumenkranz – bass, oud
- Cyro Baptista – percussion
