= Caym: Book of Angels Volume 17 =

Studio album by Banquet of the Spirits
- Released: January 2011
- Recorded: 2010
- Genres: Avant-garde, jazz, Contemporary classical music
- Length: 48:29
- Labels: Tzadik; 7388
- Producer: John Zorn

Cyro Baptista chronology
Infinito (2009)	Caym: Book of Angels Volume 17 (2011)	Bluefly (2016)

Book of Angels chronology
Haborym: Book of Angels Volume 16 (2010)	Caym: Book of Angels Volume 17 (2011)	Pruflas: Book of Angels Volume 18 (2011)

Caym: Book of Angels Volume 17 is an album by Cyro Baptista's band Banquet of the Spirits performing compositions from John Zorn's second Masada book, "The Book of Angels".

== Reception ==
Warren Allen from All About Jazz stated "This union of Zorn's compositions and Baptista's joyously tight band and world aesthetic makes for one of the most wonderfully exciting and eclectic releases in the series... Amidst the panoply of world grooves, the listener finds mystical chants, astral bells and swirling keys... The album is, in some part, jazz. But it's also everything else—from traditional Moroccan music to Balinese gamelan playing—along with the heavy Brazilian, Middle Eastern and even electronica influences". Tom Volk noted that "Caym is 50 minutes of swirling exotica, navigated by four excellent players who all have their moments in the baked desert sun of which the music is so evocative".

== Track listing ==
All compositions by John Zorn

1. "Chamyel" – 4:27 (listed on the packaging as "Chamiel")
2. "Matafiel" – 5:21
3. "Briel" – 4:18
4. "Zephaniah" – 3:53 (listed on the packaging as "Chamiel")
5. "Tzar Tak" – 3:45
6. "Flaef" – 2:05
7. "Hutriel" – 4:27
8. "Yeqon" – 4:54
9. "Yahel" – 2:26
10. "Tahariel" – 4:46
11. "Natiel" – 4:00
12. "Phaleg" – 4:07

== Personnel ==
- Cyro Baptista – percussion, vocals
- Brian Marsella – piano, harpsichord, pump organ, vocals
- Shanir Ezra Blumenkranz – oud, bass, gimbri, vocals
- Tim Keiper – drums, percussion, kamel ngoni, vocals
