= Frank London =

American trumpeter (born 1958)

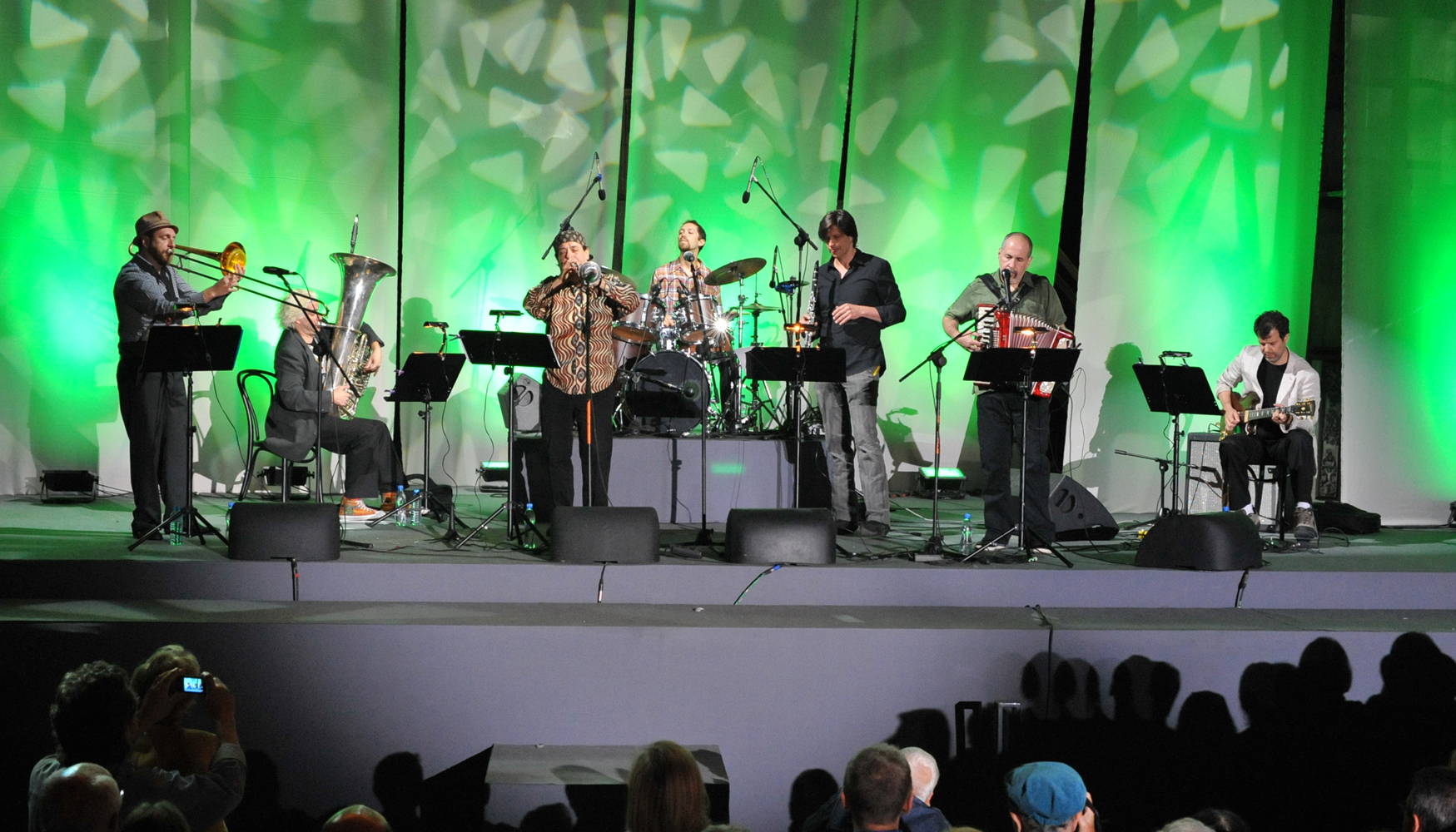
- Frank London's Klezmer Brass Allstars playing in Warsaw in September 2011

Background information
- Born: June 3, 1958 (age 67); Bronx, New York, United States
- Genres: klezmer, jazz, world
- Occupation: Musician
- Instrument: trumpet

Frank London (born June 3, 1958 in New York) is an American klezmer trumpeter who also plays jazz and world music.

== Early life ==
London was born to a Reform Jewish family and grew up in Plainview, New York and Connecticut. He started playing the trumpet in fourth grade.

== Career ==
London received a B.A. in Afro-American music from the New England Conservatory in 1980. He is on the music faculty of the State University of New York at Purchase. He is a member of The Klezmatics, Hasidic New Wave, and leads Frank London's Klezmer Brass Allstars. He was a co-founder of Les Misérables Brass Band and original member of the Klezmer Conservatory Band. He served as conductor and music director for David Byrne and Robert Wilson's The Knee Plays and has collaborated with the Palestinian American violinist Simon Shaheen.

He has worked with Chava Alberstein, Lester Bowie, John Cale, Gal Costa, Ben Folds Five, Avraham Fried, Allen Ginsberg, Anne LeBaron, LL Cool J, Luna, Maurice El Mediouni, Natalie Merchant, David Murray, Itzhak Perlman, Iggy Pop, Jerome Rothenberg, Marc Ribot, Jane Siberry, Jon Spencer Blues Explosion, They Might Be Giants, Mel Tormé, Reggie Workman, La Monte Young, Lev Zhurbin, and John Zorn.

== Discography ==
=== As leader ===
- Glass House Orchestra – Astro-Hungarian Jewish Music
- Invocations (cantorial music)
- Hazonos (cantorial music)
- "Scientist at Work" (produced by John Zorn)

Frank London with Lorin Sklamberg (Klezmatics singer):

- Nigunim (Jewish mystical songs)
- The Zmiros Project (Shabbes songs)
- tsuker-zis (holiday songs, featuring Knox Chandler, Ara Dinkjian & Deep Singh)

Frank London's Klezmer Brass Allstars:

- Di Shikere Kapelye
- Brotherhood of Brass
- Carnival Conspiracy
- Chronika

The Shekhina Big Band:

- The Shekhina Big Band

Film and theater music:

- The Debt (film and theater music)

Soundtracks:

- The Shvitz
- Divan (film by Pearl Gluck)

Hasidic New Wave:

- "Jews & The Abstract Truth"
- "Psycho-Semitic"
- "Kabalogy"
- "Live In Krakow" (on Not Two records)
- "From The Belly of Abraham"

With Jon Madof's Zion80

- Zion80 (Tzadik, 2013)
- Adramelech: Book of Angels Volume 22 (Tzadik, 2014)

With Auktyon

- Devushki payut (2007)

== Compositions ==
London has composed numerous works for theater, dance, and film, and is the recipient of several Meet the Composer grants. Some of his major works include the folk opera A Night in the Old Marketplace (based on Y. L. Peretz's Bay nakht oyfn altn mark); Davenen, a dance for the Pilobolus Dance Theatre and the Klezmatics; 48 Great Small Works' The Memoirs of Gluckel of Hameln, and Min Tanaka's Romance. In 2011, A Night in the Old Marketplace was workshopped and premiered at MassMOCA.

He has also composed music for films, including John Sayles' The Brother from Another Planet (1984) and Men With Guns (1997), Yvonne Rainer's Murder and Murder, the Czech-American Marionette Theater's Golem, and Tamar Rogoff's Ivye Project.

== Other activities ==
He has been featured on HBO's Sex and the City soundtrack, at the North Sea Jazz Festival, and at the Lincoln Center Summer Festival. He attends various workshops throughout the year, including KlezKanada of Montreal, where he teaches aspiring musicians the art of klezmer music. He has taught Jewish music in Canada, Crimea, and the Catskills and is Artistic Director of KlezFest London in London, England.

== Awards ==
- Grammy Award for Best Contemporary World Music Album (2007)
