= Filmworks XVI: Workingman's Death =

Soundtrack album by John Zorn
- Released: April 26, 2005
- Recorded: January–March, 2005
- Genre: Avant-garde, jazz, classical
- Length: 61:23
- Label: Tzadik
- Producer: John Zorn

Filmworks chronology
Filmworks XV: Protocols of Zion (2005)	Filmworks XVI: Workingman's Death (2005)	Filmworks Anthology (2005)

John Zorn chronology
Sanhedrin 1994–1997 (2005)	Filmworks XVI: Workingman's Death (2005)	Astaroth: Book of Angels Volume 1 (2005)

Filmworks XVI: Workingman's Death features a score by John Zorn for a documentary film by Michael Glawogger. The album was released on Zorn's own label, Tzadik Records, in 2005 and contains music that Zorn wrote and recorded for, Workingman's Death (2005), a documentary detailing hazardous employment undertaken in Ukraine, Indonesia, Nigeria, Pakistan, and China.

== Track listing ==
1. "Gadani Slipway" - 9:01
2. "Juju" - 6:14
3. "Sulphur Mining" - 6:29
4. "Horn Carrier" - 3:16
5. "Atmosphere" - 2:13
6. "The Miners" - 3:05
7. "Steel Factory" - 6:01
8. "Work Trance" - 3:20
9. "Ghost Ship" - 2:51
10. "Dark Caves" - 3:17
11. "Slaughterhouse" - 9:09
12. "Guitar Juju" - 6:20

All music by John Zorn

- Produced by John Zorn.

== Personnel ==
- John Zorn – organ, gamelin
- Shanir Ezra Blumenkranz – bass
- Jamie Saft – electric piano, guitar
- Cyro Baptista – percussion
- Ikue Mori – electronic percussion
