= Scott Johnson (composer) =

American composer (1952–2023)

Scott Richard Johnson (May 12, 1952 – March 24, 2023) was an American composer known for his pioneering use of recorded speech as musical melody, and his distinctive crossing of American vernacular and art music traditions, making extensive use of electric guitar in concert works, and adapting popular music structures for art music genres such as the string quartet. He was the recipient of a 2006 Guggenheim fellowship, and a 2015 American Academy of Arts and Letters Award.

== Education and background ==
Johnson was born on May 12, 1952, in Madison, Wisconsin. He graduated from the University of Wisconsin in Madison, majoring in visual arts, and dividing his time between visual arts and music. In 1975 he moved to New York City and became involved in the thriving art scene in downtown Manhattan. He initially focused on the visual arts, including sculpture, performance, and installation art, with shows at Artists Space and The Franklin Furnace. He also began to play guitar in other people's projects, working with such artists as Laurie Anderson and Rhys Chatham. Eventually his increasing use of manipulated audiotape in his performance and installation work led to a re-engagement with music, and he began to perform his own compositions at venues including The Kitchen, the premier avant-garde music, dance, and performance art space of the time.

== John Somebody and early work ==
Johnson's 1982 work John Somebody for electric guitar and recorded speech is an early example of speech melody framed in tonal harmony. It is the first instance of an instrumental score based on the melodies of spoken phrases, and used as an accompaniment to those recorded phrases. It is named for the opening tape loop of a single female voice, repeating these phrases, which are then imitated by layered guitars:

You know who's in New York?
You remember that guy... J-John somebody?
He was a-- he was sort of a--...

Johnson's early works were created long before the advent of digital music editing. Creating tape loops like this meant actually cutting and splicing long strips of magnetic tape into loops, running them through a player to dub onto a destination tape. Modern digital audio sampling technology allows for a far more efficient process. For example, a 2015 work, Mind out of Matter, contains more than 2,500 words. Johnson's technique of transcribing speech melodies for use in instrumental scores has since been used by a number of composers, including Jacob Ter Veldhuis, Robert Davidson, Florent Ghys, and Steve Reich.

Johnson listed three influences for his invention of this technique: Messiaen's transcription of bird songs, call and response in American blues, and the early speech tape loop works of Steve Reich, It's Gonna Rain (1965) and Come Out (1966). Those works used looped speech, but did not involve any instrumental writing derived from the speech. Reich later adopted Johnson's speech transcription technique for Different Trains (1986) and subsequent speech sampling works.

During the same years that John Somebody was being written, Johnson composed Five Movements, a 30 minute work for solo electric guitar and live electronic processing, using the pitch-shifting capabilities of an Eventide Harmonizer. John Somebody is performed as a work for solo electric guitar and a prerecorded backing track, and together with Five Movements it was a staple of Johnson's solo performances in America and Europe. The Eventide Harmonizer was also used to create the tape tracks for two other works for solo guitar and tape, No Memory and U79, which used electronically altered voice sounds rather than comprehensible speech.

== Later work ==
During the 1980s and early 1990s, Johnson composed work for two ensembles of his own, and performed as guitarist. The first was an octet with the instrumentation of a large rock band: electric guitars, saxophones, and percussion. Beginning in 1989, he organized a quartet of violin, cello, electric guitar, and piano/synthesizer. This ensemble released a 1996 CD called Rock/Paper/Scissors, including an instrumental work of that title and a speech sampling work called Convertible Debts. During the 1980s Johnson also received his first commission from the Kronos Quartet, and wrote the music for director Paul Schrader's 1988 film Patty Hearst. In this project, he returned to the use of recorded speech, featuring Actress Natasha Richardson as Hearst. In the 1990s, he wrote an hour long work for the Kronos Quartet, How it Happens, based on the sampled voice of journalist I.F. Stone.

From 2000, Johnson continued to write both commissioned works and music for ensembles of his own making. These include Americans, a speech sampling work based on the voices of immigrants to the United States, and scored for a septet that resembles an extended rock band. Assembly Required is a wholly instrumental work written for the same ensemble. Other distinctive instrumentations include Up and Back commissioned by Japan Society, for shamisen, electric guitar, cello, and piano; and Bowery Haunt, for electric guitar duo. Other commissioned works include The Illusion of Guidance for the Bang on a Can All-Stars, Last Time Told for the Cygnus Ensemble, and Stalking Horse, for the American Composer's Orchestra.

Johnson's largest work, Mind Out of Matter, is based on the sampled voice of American philosopher Daniel C. Dennett. It has been performed and recorded by the contemporary music ensemble Alarm Will Sound. This evening length work explores Dennett's scientifically-oriented view of the origins and evolution of religion. As with How it Happens and Americans, it engages directly with social and political issues, placing a reality-based text within an expressive musical setting that is ultimately derived from the melodies of the speaker's recorded voice.

Johnson was a vocal proponent of opening the classical tradition to influences derived from living popular music. He gave talks on this aspect of his work at major universities and conservatories, and his extended essay The Counterpoint of Species looks at the evolution of musical styles through the lens of Darwinian principles. It was published in Arcana: Musicians on Music, edited by John Zorn, and quoted in Piero Weiss and Richard Taruskin's Music in The Western World (2nd Edition). Artist residencies include the Rockefeller Foundation's Bellagio Center, and Civitella Ranieri.

== Death ==
Johnson was diagnosed with lung cancer in 2021, and died of complications from aspiration pneumonia in Manhattan on March 24, 2023. His wife Marlisa Monroe, a classical music publicist, died on the same day. They were both aged 70.

== See also ==
- Minimalist music
- Philip Glass
- Terry Riley
- La Monte Young
- Steve Reich
- Glenn Branca
- Lois Vierk
