= Filmworks XIV: Hiding and Seeking =

Soundtrack album by John Zorn
- Released: 2003
- Recorded: April 2003
- Genre: Avant-garde, jazz, classical
- Length: 53:28
- Label: Tzadik
- Producer: John Zorn

John Zorn's Filmworks chronology
Filmworks XIII: Invitation to a Suicide (2002)	Filmworks XIV: Hiding and Seeking (2003)	Filmworks XV: Protocols of Zion (2005)

John Zorn chronology
Buck Jam Tonic (2003)	Filmworks XIV: Hiding and Seeking (2003)	50th Birthday Celebration Volume 1 (2004)

Filmworks XIV: Hiding and Seeking features a score for film by John Zorn. The album was released on Zorn's own label, Tzadik Records, in 2003 and contains music that Zorn wrote and recorded for, Hiding and Seeking (2003), a documentary directed by Menachem Daum and Oren Rudavsky.

== Reception ==
The Allmusic review by Thom Jurek awarded the album 4½ stars noting that "Zorn's score is one of his most beautiful and accessible... This work is beyond folk forms, beyond jazz, and beyond the kitschy sense of humor Zorn often employs (even more so than The Gift), resulting in a work that is profound, moving, and full of sensual delight".

Professional ratings
Review scores
Source	Rating
Allmusic	4.5/5 stars

== Track listing ==
1. "Merkabah" (vocal) - 6:23
2. "Sekhel" - 4:38
3. "Zhakor" (vocal) - 3:43
4. "Muflah" - 5:19
5. "Abulafia" - 2:27
6. "Abulafia" (vocal) - 3:39
7. "Chirik" - 4:26
8. "Moadim" - 3:26
9. "Zhakor" - 4:24
10. "Sekhel" (vocal) - 4:59
11. "Adamah" - 4:27
12. "Merkabah" - 5:31

All music by John Zorn

- Recorded at Frank Booth, Brooklyn (New York) in April 2003.
- Produced by John Zorn.

== Personnel ==
- Marc Ribot – guitar
- Kenny Wollesen – vibraphone
- Trevor Dunn – bass
- Cyro Baptista – percussion
- Ganda Suthivarakom (1, 3, 6, 10): vocals.
