= Protocols of Zion (film) =

- Protocols of Zion movie poster
- Directed by: Marc Levin
- Produced by: Steve Kalafer; Marc Levin
- Starring: Marc Levin; Alan Levin
- Cinematography: Mark Benjamin
- Edited by: Ken Eluto
- Music by: John Zorn
- Distributed by: THINKFilm
- Release dates: January 21, 2005 (Sundance); October 21, 2005
- Running time: 95 minutes
- Language: English
- Box office: $178,875

Protocols of Zion is a 2005 documentary film by Marc Levin about a resurgence of antisemitism in the United States in the wake of the September 11, 2001 attacks. Appearing on screen along with his subjects, Levin engages in a free-for-all dialogue with Arab Americans, Black nationalists, evangelists, White nationalists, Neo-Nazis, Kabbalist rabbis, Holocaust survivors, and Frank Weltner, the founder of the Jew Watch web site.

== Production ==
Levin's film draws its inspiration from an encounter he had in a New York taxi not long after 9/11. His driver, an Egyptian immigrant, repeated the false claim that the Jews had been warned not to go to work at the World Trade Center on the day of the attack and cited The Protocols of the Elders of Zion, an antisemitic hoax published in 1903 that purports to disclose the Jews' master plan to rule the world. Encountering further examples, such as hearing that a newspaper was serializing the Protocols, convinced Levin to make a film on the topic. His first idea was a satirical film, but when he found that two serious dramatizations had already been produced, he instead made a documentary. Levin did not want to make a scholarly examination of antisemitism or the Protocols itself. Rather than interviewing academics, he focused on man-on-the-street interviews. Levin wanted the film to be emotive and ask questions. He said the very topic was taboo, and people had suggested that he not even mention the Protocols for fear of driving further interest in it.

== Release ==
The film premiered at Sundance on January 21, 2004. HBO bought the television rights, and THINKFilm gave it a limited theatrical release. It grossed $178,875 in the US.

== Reception ==
On Rotten Tomatoes the film has an approval rating of 67% based on reviews from 58 critics. The site's consensus states: "Levin takes viewers on a personal journey, laying bare the ugly and varied faces of anti-Semitism." On Metacritic the film has a score of 60% based on reviews from 23 critics.

== See also ==
- Antisemitism in the United States
- Israeli–Palestinian conflict
- New antisemitism
- Pierre-André Taguieff (interviewed in the film)
