= Jon Madof =

Jon Madof (born May 28, 1974) is an American guitarist, composer, and leader of the bands Rashanim and Zion80, who has performed extensively with other artists including John Zorn, Matisyahu, Marc Ribot, and Frank London.

PopMatters' Sean Murphy said "All of his projects thus far have explored traditional Jewish sounds with a skillful blend of surf music, thrash, jazz and calmer acoustic. Each successive effort has seen Madof stretching and pushing himself farther, in as well as out, utilizing exotic instruments with feeling always at the forefront".

== Discography ==
=== Solo ===
- Urim (2024)

=== As leader ===
With Jon Madof Trio

- Netzach (Tzadik, 2026)

With Rashanim

- Rashanim (Tzadik, 2003)
- Masada Rock (Tzadik, 2005)
- Shalosh (Tzadik, 2006)
- The Gathering (Tzadik, 2009)

With Zion80

- Zion80 (Tzadik, 2012)
- Adramelech: Book of Angels Volume 22 (Tzadik, 2014)
- Warriors (Chant, 2017)
- Hod: The Book Beri'ah, Volume 8 (Tzadik, 2019)
- Warriors RMX (Chant, 2021)

With Blivet

- Blivet (EJT, 2015)

=== With others ===
With ePHRYME

- Ruthless Cosmopolitans EP (Chant, 2020)

With Sean Noonan's Brewed by Noon

- Stories to Tell (Songlines, 2007)

With John Zorn

- Voices in the Wilderness (Tzadik, 2003)
- The Unknown Masada (Tzadik, 2003)
- Filmworks XVII: Notes on Marie Menken/Ray Bandar: A Life with Skulls (Tzadik, 2006)
