= As One =

As One may refer to:

People

- Kirk Degiorgio, British techno producer and DJ

Entertainment

- As One (opera), a 2014 opera composed by Laura Kaminsky
- As One (film), a 2012 film

Music

- As One (musical duo), a South Korean musical duo
- As One (Hong Kong band), a cantopop girl group in Hong Kong
- As One (Richard Davis album), 1976
- As One (The Bar Kays album), 1980
- As One (Kool & the Gang album), 1982
- As One (Jane Ira Bloom and Fred Hersch album), 1985
- As One (Toshinobu Kubota album), 2000
- As One, an album by Double Trouble, 1990
- "As One", a song by Jay-Z on his 2002 album The Blueprint 2: The Gift & The Curse
- "As One", a song by Suede on their 2018 album The Blue Hour
- "As One" (Tarot song), 1995
