= Chasing Paint =

Studio album by Jane Ira Bloom
- Released: March 4, 2003
- Recorded: April 14 and May 3, 2002
- Studio: The Studio, NYC
- Genre: Jazz
- Length: 50:38
- Label: Arabesque; AJ-0158
- Producer: Jane Ira Bloom

Jane Ira Bloom chronology
Sometimes the Magic (2001)	Chasing Paint (2003)	Like Silver, Like Song (2004)

Chasing Paint, (subtitled Jane Ira Bloom Meets Jackson Pollock), is an album by saxophonist Jane Ira Bloom which was recorded in 2002 and released on the Arabesque label the following year.

== Reception ==
Professional ratings
Review scores
Source	Rating
AllMusic	4/5 stars
The Buffalo News	3/4 stars
Penguin Guide to Jazz	3.5/4 stars
Tom Hull	A−
The Penguin Guide to Jazz	3.5/4 stars

The AllMusic review by David Dupont said "With Chasing Paint, Jane Ira Bloom offers a follow-up to her well-received Red Quartets session of 1999. Returning with the same cast, Bloom offers a sound portrait of abstract expressionist painter Jackson Pollock. True to her own muse, Bloom's portrait, while abstract, is impressionistic rather than expressionistic. ... With Chasing Paint, Bloom creates a series of complementary pieces that have the coherence and sweep of an extended work". Jeff Simon of The Buffalo News added, "...And if Pollock could come back to life one night and hear Bloom play "The Sweetest Sounds" for him, I think his furious, questing heart would melt."

On All About Jazz, Franz A. Matzner stated "Jane Ira Bloom's experimental homage Chasing Paint was both immediately fascinating and disturbing ... what Bloom has attempted is a translation into sound of Pollack's [sic] transmutation of sound into color and movement. The result is a series of dense, explorative compositions, the faultless execution of which delineates the thoroughly progressive and acutely perspicacious nature of Bloom’s writing",

In JazzTimes, Nate Chinen wrote "the album conveys a meticulous air even as it heeds jazz’s freer impulses. Bloom’s soprano saxophone is characteristically fleet and full-toned, capturing all the angular caprice of a brush on canvas ... At times, Bloom’s trademark electronic effects manage to evoke a drip painting’s network of color and line. Yet even at its most elliptical, this album remains wholly approachable. Like a Pollock canvas, it needn’t be explained to be understood".

== Track listing ==
All compositions by Jane Ira Bloom except where noted

1. "Unexpected Light" – 8:34
2. "Chasing Paint" – 7:12
3. "The Sweetest Sounds" (Richard Rodgers) – 3:24
4. "On Seeing JP" – 4:54
5. "Many Wonders" – 6:39
6. "Jackson Pollock" – 2:54
7. "Alchemy" – 8:24
8. "Reflections of the Big Dipper" – 4:09
9. "White Light" – 4:28

== Personnel ==
- Jane Ira Bloom – soprano saxophone, live electronics
- Fred Hersch – piano
- Mark Dresser – bass
- Bobby Previte – drums
