= M'lumbo =

Long-running NYC jazz-electronic band

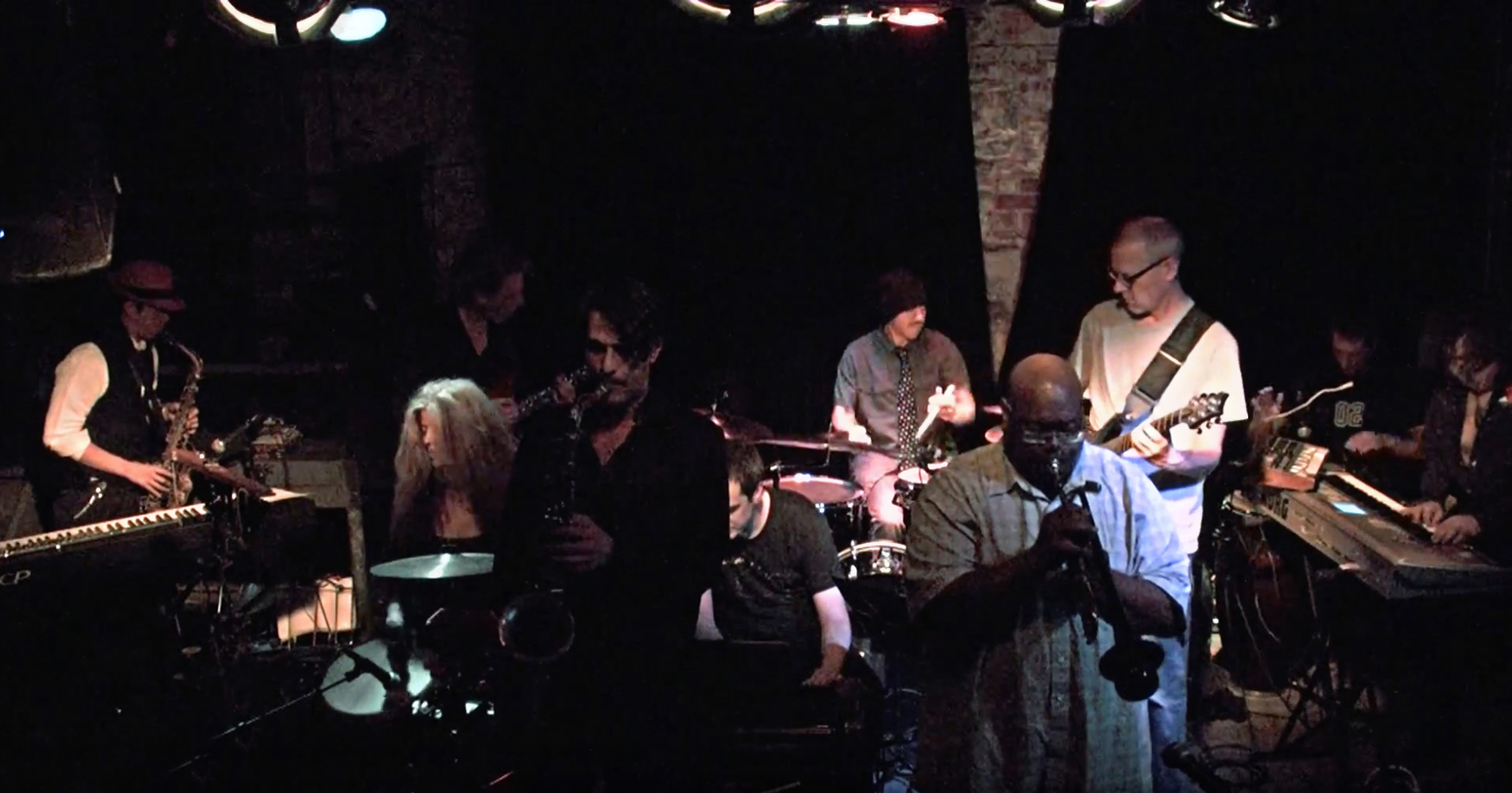
- M'lumbo onstage at Bowery Electric March 2, 2013 with Page Hamilton. Left to right: Vin Veloso, Maureen O'Connor, Brian O'Neill, Paul Meurens, Jarek Szczyglak, Jaz Sawyer, Cecil Young, Page Hamilton, Dehran Duckworth, Rob Ray.

Background information
- Origin: New York City, New York, U.S.
- Genres: jazz; electronic; rock; funk; ambient; world; experimental
- Years active: 1985–present
- Labels: Ropeadope (now); Pursuance; Mulatta; Warner Brothers; Staalplaat; Multimood; World Domination
- Members: Rob Flatow, Rob "m’botto" Ray; "Zombie" Ron Boggs; Brian O’ Neill; Paul Alexandre Meurens; Vincent Veloso; Cecil Young; Jaz Sawyer; Maureen O’Connor; Dehran Duckworth; Eduardo Guedes; Jarek Szczyglak
- Past members: Josh Ferrazzano; Matt Bass; Kurt Leege; John DiMaggio; Dylan Wallace; Guy Sherman (Guy "Voices" Morocco); Mark "King Funny" Giammanco; Mark "Jesus" Sklawer; Tony "Mahatma Coat" Fortuna
- Website: mlumbo.com

M'lumbo is an American band based in New York City. Their music spans several genres — jazz, electronic, rock, hip-hop — and incorporates sounds and rhythms of the world's cultures and traditions — Western orchestral, African, Latin, Asian. Founded in the mid-1980s by working rock and session musicians with broad musical backgrounds, M'lumbo was conceived as a vehicle for eclectic, hand-made music free of the mannerisms of any era but free also to reference any of them. From the start, the band's music has featured improvisation, interplay, and a wide dynamic range from relaxed and sparse to intense and many-layered.

Material on M'lumbo's earliest releases was a mix of originals and cover versions followed by airplay. The band's covers have included Mickey Mouse, Movin' On Up (Theme from The Jeffersons), and Hawaii Five-O. In the later 2000s and early 2010s, M'lumbo would return to covering pop-culture "standards" with versions of such favorites as Hawaii Five-O revisited, Sesame Street and Beat It.

Except for a period in the early 1990s, M'lumbo's music has had few sung lyrics, but it has often had vocals: many songs have some speaking or singing, found, cut up, or performed by band members, of varying prominence, ranging from incidental color to hooks and even dialog or narration that functions like a lead vocal.

As a band and individually, M'lumbo and its multimedia crew have done creative work for hire for various well-known performers and national brands. Such work doesn't always result in credits, but often enough it has: drummer Dr. Jaz Sawyer has recorded and performed with many notable artists, including Abbey Lincoln, Wynton Marsalis, George Benson, Bobby Hutcherson; Director and Director of Photography Matt Bass has worked on commercials, documentaries, and music videos.

In 2020 M'lumbo released its most recent two albums on Ropeadope Records, Fairytale Aliens and Celestial Mechanics.

M'lumbo has been active through the COVID-19 pandemic, writing and recording new material, collaborating mostly remotely with each other and with Jane Ira Bloom and Page Hamilton. The result has been a couple of albums of new material that will see release in 2023 (see below, During and Since the Pandemic).

== History ==
=== Beginnings ===
M'lumbo was founded in the mid-80's by Robert "M'botto" Ray and "Zombie" Ron Boggs as an escape from commercial music. They were then, amongst other projects, in a mainstream "rock" band managed by Mick Jagger's manager, which included Page Hamilton. Page would go on to play with Glenn Branca and found Helmet, but enjoyed M'lumbo since its earliest days and in later years has collaborated with the band (see below, Page Hamilton).

Its earliest, hand-made cassette releases were instrumental, semi-acoustic, African-inspired, live performances of originals and reimagined, sometimes medleyed covers (Mickey Mouse, The Lion Sleeps Tonight, The Flintstones, Perry Mason, In A Gadda Da Vida, Crossroads/Hava Negila/others), performed as structured pieces that allowed for improvisation and for cued or gradual transitions between sections. The constraints and opportunities of live recording placed a premium on listening and playing in supportive or complementary ways, and more quietly than loudly. These aspects of the band's aesthetics have endured to the present day.

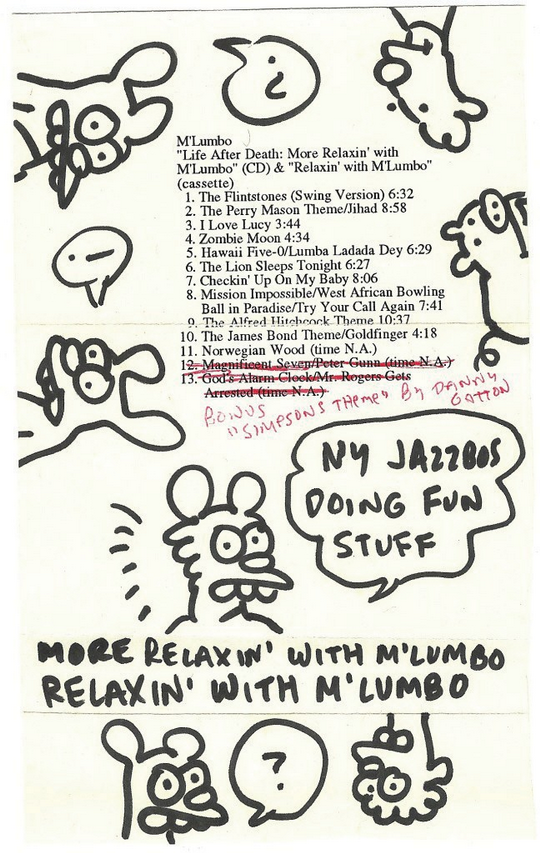
Inner cover of Matt Groening's personal mix tape of M'lumbo's first two albums

The cassettes began selling well at local East Village record stores (Tower Records, Sounds, Multikulti, Generation, Kim's Video, others), leading to radio play on over 100 U.S. stations and many appreciative reviews which compared their sound to Sun Ra, electric Miles Davis, King Sunny Ade, and The Bonzo Dog Band.

Their first public performance was at the original Knitting Factory (they would go on to play at all three Knitting Factory locations, regularly at the second — *see below [link to section]), and soon thereafter in the Masters of Modern Music series at St. Ann's Cathedral.

This version of M'lumbo released the band's first CD, Life After Death (1991), a collection of new tracks plus digital releases of tracks from their three cassettes.

M'lumbo has since been featured on many public, college and progressive radio stations worldwide, including syndicated shows featuring their music, including John Schaefer's New Sounds; All Mixed Up with Peter Bochan, Michel Pollizi's show Le Melange on Radio Libertaire.

=== Early reviews ===
To approach a merely adequate description, try and imagine a combination of Miles Davis, Sun Ra, traditional African music, and early Bonzo Dog Band... Very exciting, filled with unbridled energy and humor. The musicianship is superb and the arrangements exceptionally creative. — Alternative Press (1991 review of M'lumbo Plays for Young Lovers)

Great players... A communicable sense of fun. It's like the day the high school marching band all took acid, the day Miles Davis' early fusion group decided to play movie themes, or the day King Sunny Ade jammed with Was (Not Was) and Pharoah Sanders.— Wif Stenger in New York Press

=== Ambient to multimedia ===
From its origins as a "pomo to a fault, brilliantly silly seven-piece jazz/funk/afropop improvisarama" (Richard Gehr, Village Voice), in the 1990s M'lumbo first evolved into a smaller unit creating original music consonant with the resurgent genre of Ambient music. By the later 1990s M'lumbo had become as much a multimedia collective as a band, having expanded to a line-up of six musicians, four filmmakers including Josh Ferrazzano and Matt Bass, and a live soundman. Their live performances began to include videos expressly made for each song.

Their 1999 film "System Noise", with end-to-end music and guest appearances by Gary Lucas, Badawi and Neotropic, won "Best Experimental Feature" at the New York International Film Festival, toured as a Slamdance feature and secured European distribution.

=== Jazz ===
Jane Ira Bloom taught M'lumbo members [az Sawyer and Cecil Young at The New School. Cecil had joined the band during his last year of studies, having already played with Alex Skolnick, Bobby Short and Lucian Ban; and Rob Ray played in Cecil's senior recital. A few years later in 2005 Jaz officially joined M'lumbo, and the band's jazz tendencies came to the foreground. Jaz has gone on to be one of contemporary Jazz's premiere drummers, performing and recording with a roster of acclaimed artists as well as under his own name.

In 2007 M'lumbo released Angel Wars, a two-disc package of all original material, consisting of a CD album and a DVD of live-in-studio performances of three tunes (The Invisible Plane, Always Looking Forward To Tomorrow, Plastic and Transparent). These tracks are all jazz tunes at their core, but don't conform to the standard structure of head/solos/head with every solo accompanied by the music of the head. The performances progress by interplay, and by collectively feeling out how and when to arrive at agreed on milestones like themes and rhythms. These tracks use spoken materials in suggestive rather than narrative or descriptive ways, providing atmosphere and layers of provisional meaning.

=== Collaborations ===
Members of M'lumbo have musical relationships with Jane Ira Bloom and Page Hamilton going back decades, which have continued with shared bills and special guest appearances both on stage and on albums.

==== With Jane Ira Bloom ====
Jane Ira Bloom was introduced to the band by her former New School students Jaz Sawyer and Cecil Young after they had joined. M'lumbo went on to record and perform with her, on compositions of her own as well as M'lumbo originals, resulting in three albums on Pursuance Records and the most recently released Celestial Mechanics (Ropeadope). She has performed with the band to support those releases contemporaneously. Celestial Mechanics covers a range of styles — what the band would call Space Age Jazz, Electronica, rock, and Exotica.

Jane has continued her collaboration with M'lumbo through the pandemic, contributing compositions and performances to forthcoming new tracks.

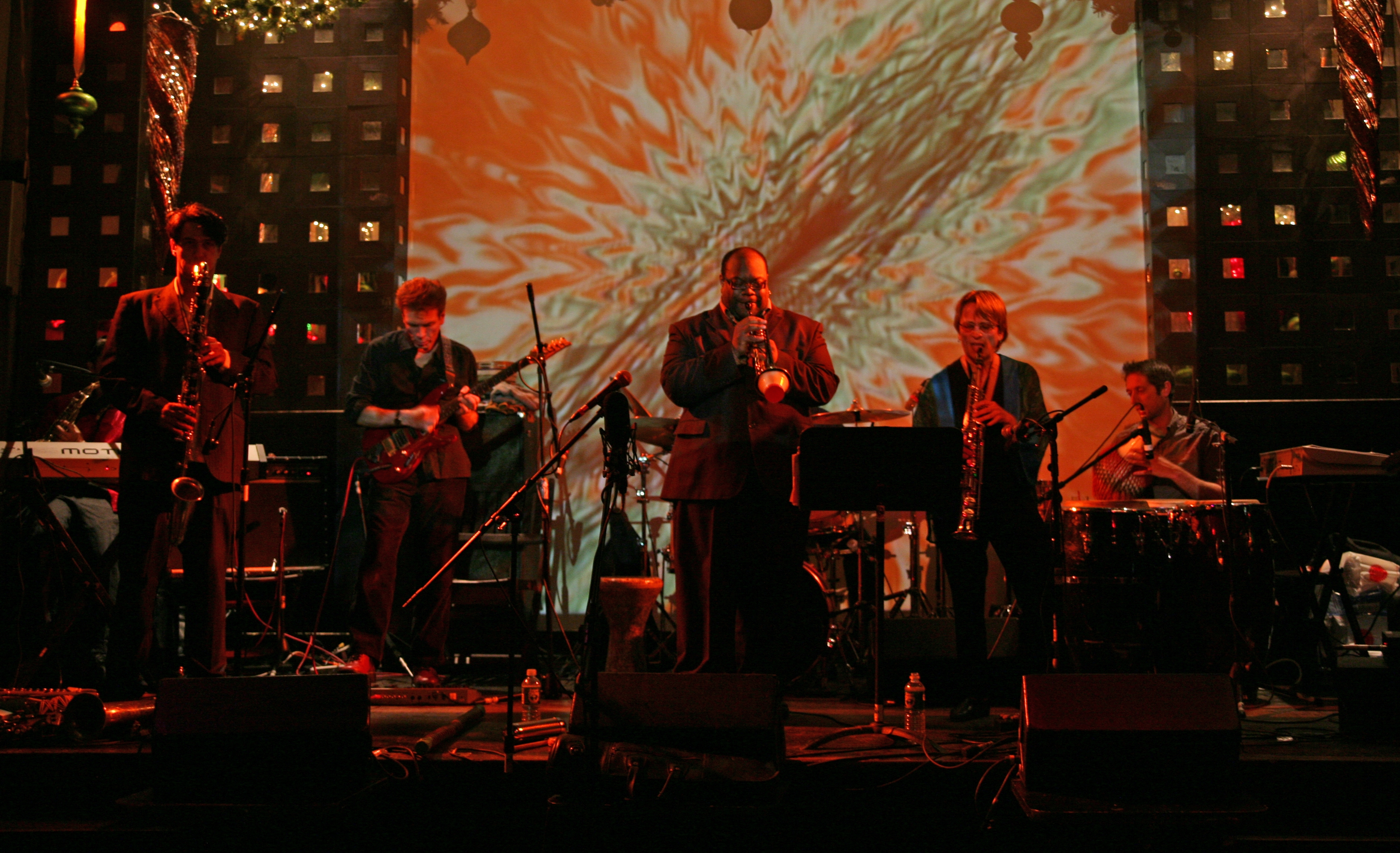
M'lumbo with Jane Ira Bloom live at SOBs, NYC

==== With Page Hamilton ====
In 2019, Fairytale Aliens by M'lumbo and Page Hamilton was released on Ropeadope. The band was to play at Bowery Electric in March 2020, but the show was cancelled due to the COVID-19 pandemic.

Page has continued collaborating with M'lumbo through the pandemic, playing on several new tracks.

=== During and since the pandemic ===
Through the COVID-19 pandemic, the band continued to write and record new material, with guests Jane Ira Bloom and Page Hamilton.

During the last few years M'lumbo has also made an album of ambient/chillout tracks that are both acoustic and electronic, cinematic without also insisting on a script. The Summer Of Endless Levitation was released in 2023 on Hell Yeah! Recordings — an 8-track LP in June 2023, with a 10-song CD following in late 2023-early 2024.

== Performances ==
M’lumbo has performed many times over the years at both the original and second Knitting Factory (and even the third), as well as at other NYC venues such as Bowery Electric, Joe's Pub, SOB's, Mo Pitkin's, and St. Anne's Cathedral, with opening acts such as The Jazz Wannabes, Neotropic, Sean Lennon, Badawi, Mantronix, virtual reality inventor Jaron Lanier, Jojo Mayer's Nerve, dj Muttamasik and Duncan Sheik. The band has gone through phases of regular public performance, and their shows have been recommended by Time Out New York, The New Yorker and The Village Voice, and garnered articles in The New York Daily News , New York Newsday, and New York Press.

== Other reviews and reactions ==
=== Reviews of The Book of Night Burning in a Garden of Ice (Staalplaat) ===
This is another real find of 1998. This is Miles Davis ambient-like grooves for the 90s. — Ear Magazine (5-star rating, highly recommended)

Better than you can imagine! being both familiar and alien at once. — Mike Gunderloy, Factsheet Five

=== Review of Celestial Mechanics ===
Of their most recent release, Celestial Mechanics, one reviewer drew parallels between M'lumbo's approaches to pop culture material and those of Sun Ra, noting common strategies both have used to transform and reconceive (or "deconstruct") very familiar melodies.

== Discography ==
=== CDs ===
- The Summer of Endless Levitation (Hell Yeah! Recordings 2023)
- Celestial Mechanics with Jane Ira Bloom (Ropeadope 2020)
- Fairytale Aliens with Page Hamilton (Ropeadope 2020)
- Popular Science (Pursuance 2013)
- Tuning In To Tomorrow (Pursuance 2012)
- Celestial Ghetto (Pursuance 2011)
- Angel Wars (Pursuance 2007) (CD and DVD)
- Sacrifices To The Neon Gods (Mulatta 2006)
- The Nine Billion Names of God (Multimood 2000)
- Spinning Tourists In A City Of Ghosts (Unit Circle 1999)
- The Book of Night Burning in a Garden of Ice (Staalplaat, J-Bird 1998)
- Life After Death (Maitre'D 1991, J-Bird 1997)

=== Cassettes ===
- M'lumbo Plays For God (Maitre'D 1990)
- M'lumbo Plays for Young Lovers (Maitre'D 1989)
- Relaxin' With M'lumbo (Maitre'D 1988)

=== On compilations ===
- Giants In the Dirt (John Coltrane and Attention, Indians!)
