= Slalom =

To slalom is to zigzag between obstacles. It may refer to:

== Sports ==
Alpine skiing and/or snowboarding

- Slalom skiing, an alpine skiing and alpine snowboarding discipline
- Giant slalom, an alpine skiing and alpine snowboarding discipline
- Super-G or Super Giant slalom, a racing discipline of alpine skiing

Other

- Autoslalom or autocross, for automobiles
- Canoe slalom, for kayak or canoe, formerly known as whitewater slalom
- Dual slalom, for mountain bikes
- Freestyle slalom skating, roller skating that involves performing tricks around a line of cones
- Slalom skateboarding, a form of downhill skateboard racing
- Slalom waterskiing, a surface water sport

== Other ==
- Slalom (video game), 1987 Nintendo skiing game
- Slalom (1965 film), an Italian film
- Slalom (2020 film), a Franco-Belgian film
- Slalom Consulting, a business and technology consulting firm
- Slalom (album), an album by Jane Ira Bloom
