= Hue and Cry =

Hue and cry is a common law process where bystanders are summoned to help apprehend a criminal.

Hue and Cry may also refer to:

- Hue and Cry (album), a 1994 jazz album by Bobby Previte
- Hue and Cry (band), a Scottish pop duo formed in 1983
- Hue and Cry (film), a 1947 British comedy directed by Charles Crichton
- Hue and Cry (newspaper), a London newspaper
- Hue and Cry, a cultivar of Iris ensata, the Japanese iris
- "Hue and Cry Over Kronstadt", a 1938 essay written by Leon Trotsky in defense of his actions during the Kronstadt Rebellion

== See also ==
- The Hue and Cry After Cupid, a masque first performed in 1608
