= It's Easy to Remember (And So Hard to Forget) =

1935 song by Rodgers and Hart

Song
- Published: 1935
- Composer: Richard Rodgers
- Lyricist: Lorenz Hart

"It's Easy to Remember (And So Hard to Forget)" is a 1935 popular song written by Richard Rodgers with lyrics by Lorenz Hart.

In June 2026, CBS News included the song in its list of the 250 essential American songs of the past 250 years.

== History ==
Published in 1935, the song was written for the 1935 film Mississippi starring Bing Crosby and W.C. Fields. Crosby introduced the song in the film and his recording for Decca Records made on February 21, 1935, with Georgie Stoll and his Orchestra and Rhythmettes and Three Shades of Blue topped the charts of the day. Crosby recorded the song again in 1954 for his album Bing: A Musical Autobiography.

The song is now a standard, with many recordings having been made by many artists.

== Other notable recordings ==
- Jane Ira Bloom – in her double album Wild Lines: Improvising Emily Dickinson (2017)
- Fred Astaire – in the album A Couple of Song and Dance Men (1975)
- Rosemary Clooney – Rosie Sings Bing (1978)
- John Coltrane – Ballads (1962)
- Perry Como – recorded for his album We Get Letters (1957)
- Doris Day – Hooray For Hollywood (1958)
- Roy Hargrove on Diamond in the Rough (1990)
- Billie Holiday – Lady in Satin (1958)
- Shirley Horn in the album I Love You, Paris (1994)
- Ahmad Jamal on The Legendary Okeh and Epic Recordings (2005)
- Keith Jarrett live trio instrumental At the Deer Head Inn (1992)
- Jack Jones for his album Lady (1967).
- Stacey Kent – included in her album In Love Again: The Music of Richard Rodgers (2002).
- Teddi King – In the Beginning, 1949–1954 (2000 compilation)
- Vera Lynn – a single release in 1947.
- Seth MacFarlane – Music Is Better Than Words (2011)
- Dean Martin for his album Pretty Baby (1957)
- Susannah McCorkle – From Broadway to Bebop (1994)
- Jane Morgan recorded for her album The American Girl from Paris (1956)
- Sue Raney – When Your Lover Has Gone (1958)
- The Rivieras – a single release in 1960.
- Dinah Shore for her album Somebody Loves Me (1959)
- Frank Sinatra – included in his album Close to You (1957)
- Mel Tormé – included in the album Easy to Remember (1979) and A Tribute to Bing Crosby (1994).
- Sarah Vaughan – included in her album Wonderful Sarah (1957)

== Film appearances ==
- 1946: The Blue Dahlia, sung in part by an uncredited actress at the Blue Dahlia
