= Fred Hersch =

American jazz pianist (born 1955)

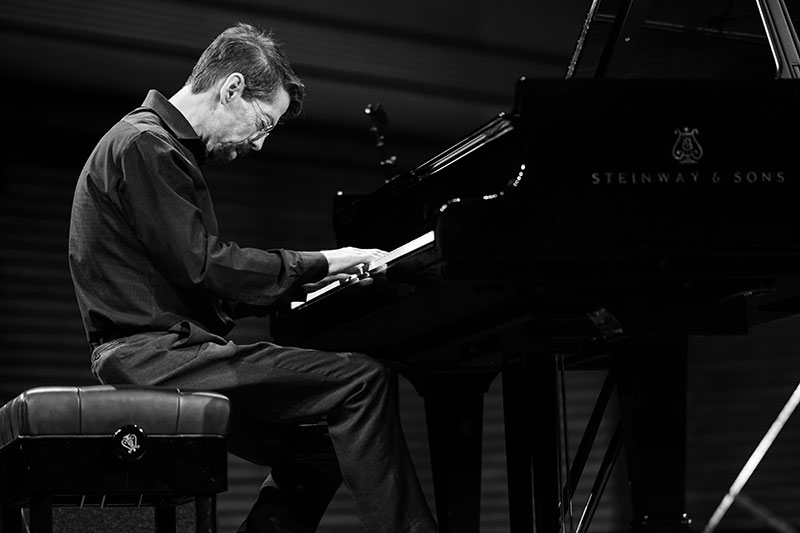
- Fred Hersch at Reykjavik Jazz Festival 2017

Background information
- Born: October 21, 1955 (age 71); Cincinnati, Ohio, U.S.
- Genre: Jazz
- Occupations: Musician, composer, educator
- Instrument: Piano
- Years active: 1977–present
- Labels: Sunnyside, Chesky, Nonesuch, Palmetto
- Website: fredhersch.com

Fred Hersch (born October 21, 1955) is an American jazz pianist, composer, and a 17-time Grammy nominee. He was the first person to play weeklong engagements as a solo pianist at the Village Vanguard in New York City. He has written and recorded more than 75 original compositions.

== Early life ==
Hersch was born in Cincinnati, Ohio, to Jewish parents. He began playing the piano at age four, under the tutelage of Jeanne Kirstein. He began composing music at eight, and won national piano competitions starting at the age of ten.

Hersch first became interested in jazz while at Grinnell College in Iowa. He dropped out of school and started playing jazz in Cincinnati. He continued his studies at the New England Conservatory under Jaki Byard, attracting attention from the press ("a fine showcase for Fred Hersch") in a college recital. On graduation, he became a jazz piano instructor at the college.

In his 2017 autobiography, Good Things Happen Slowly: A Life In and Out of Jazz, Hersch talks about seeing Sun Ra and his Intergalactic Arkestra at Gilly's, a now-closed jazz club in Dayton, Ohio. He recalls being in the audience when bandleader Art Pepper kicked the pianist hired for the occasion off the stand and asked if there was anyone in the audience who could sit in—an offer Hersch took up, which essentially launched his career.

== Career ==
In 1977, Hersch moved to New York. One of his earliest professional engagements was with Art Farmer in Los Angeles in 1978. Jazz critic Leonard Feather wrote that Hersch "showed his ability as an accompanist and soloist at the out-of-tune piano". He played with Farmer again in 1981. In 1982, the album A Work of Art (Art Farmer Quartet, Concord Jazz CJ-179), was released, with Hersch on piano, including two of Hersch's own compositions; Leonard Feather gave it 3½ stars.

In 1980, the Fred Hersch Trio played at B. Dalton Bookseller, one of many fringe events that were an offshoot of the Newport Jazz Festival. The next year, his trio played for singer Chris Connor, who was making a comeback after completing a recovery program for alcoholism. Hersch also played at the Kool Jazz Festival that year, and with Joe Henderson in the New Jazz at the Public series.

In 1983, Hersch played a duo session with bassist Ratzo Harris at the Knickerbocker Saloon, New York. The New York Times wrote: "Mr. Hersch is a romantic. He is openly involved in what he is playing and projects this involvement with body English and facial expressions that subtly underline the sense of his music. His lines often become gently billowing waves of sound, and he rises and falls, tenses and relaxes along with them."

In 1983–84, Hersch played many sessions with Jane Ira Bloom in several venues, and with whom he recorded the album, Mighty Lights. In 1985, he played with the Jamie Baum Quartet.

In 1986, he played with Toots Thielemans at the Great Woods jazz festival. He played with him in several sessions the following year, and again in 1987, receiving special attention for his solos. In 1986, he taught at Berklee College of Music.

He was the pianist for the Eddie Daniels quartet in 1987 and appeared on his album, To Bird with Love.

In 1988, Hersch played in Somerville, Massachusetts with his quintet at the Willow Jazz Club. The Boston Globe described him as "an elegant, highly melodic player."

In 1989, Hersch played with Janis Siegel of The Manhattan Transfer and they recorded together in a studio set up in his home. His first solo piano recording came in 1993: Fred Hersch at Maybeck.

In 2006, Palmetto Records released the solo CD Fred Hersch in Amsterdam: Live at the Bimhuis, and released his eighth solo disc, Fred Hersch Plays Jobim, in 2009.

In 2024, Hersch played with Drew Gress and Joey Baron at the Teatro Mario Del Monaco, in Treviso, in North East of Italy. The concert was part of the festival Treviso Suona Jazz Festival.

== Composing ==
Hersch's own compositions feature prominently in nearly all of his concerts and recordings. He has received commissions from the Gilmore Keyboard Festival, the Doris Duke Foundation, the Miller Theatre at Columbia University, the Gramercy Trio and the Brooklyn Youth Chorus. A disc of his through-composed works, Fred Hersch: Concert Music 2001-2006, was released by Naxos Records.

Many of Hersch's compositions have been transcribed by music publisher Edition Peters, including Valentine, Three Character Studies, Saloon Songs, and 24 Variations on a Bach Chorale.

Hersch was awarded a 2003 Guggenheim Memorial Fellowship for composition. In the same year, he created Leaves of Grass (Palmetto Records), a large-scale setting of Walt Whitman's poetry for two voices (Kurt Elling and Kate McGarry) and an instrumental octet; it was presented in March 2005 at Zankel Hall at Carnegie Hall as part of a six-city U.S. tour.

== Accompanist ==
Hersch has worked with instrumentalists and vocalists in the worlds of jazz (Joe Henderson, Charlie Haden, Art Farmer, Stan Getz, Jay Clayton, and Bill Frisell), classical music (Renée Fleming, Dawn Upshaw, Joshua Bell, Christopher O'Riley, Nadja Salerno-Sonnenberg), and Broadway (Audra McDonald). He has accompanied jazz vocalists such as Nancy King, Norma Winstone and Kurt Elling.

Hersch has taught at The New School and Manhattan School of Music, and conducted a Professional Training Workshop for Young Musicians at The Weill Institute at Carnegie Hall in 2008.

== Awards and honors ==
- Académie Charles Cros
- Guggenheim Memorial Fellowship in Composition, 2003
- Coup de coeur for Alone at the Vanguard, 2011
- Grand Prix du Disque for Alive at the Vanguard, 2012
- Pianist of the Year, Jazz Journalists Association, 2011, 2016, 2018
- Pianist of the Year, DownBeat magazine Critics' Poll, 2015
- Artiste étranger de l'année, Jazz magazine in France, 2015
- Grand Prix du Disque de l'Académie du Jazz, Solo, 2015
- Honorary Doctor of Musical Arts, Northern Kentucky University, 2015
- Doris Duke Performing Artist Award 2016
- Honorary Doctor of Humane Letters, Grinnell College, 2016
- Prix Honorem in Jazz and Coup de cœur jazz, 2017
- Book of the Year about Jazz, Good Things Happen Slowly, Jazz Journalists Association, 2018
- Hersch has been awarded a Rockefeller Fellowship, grants from Chamber Music America, the National Endowment for the Arts, Meet the Composer, and seven composition residencies at the MacDowell Colony.

=== Grammy Awards nominations ===
Art Farmer's A Work of Art in 1983 and two of Eddie Daniels' albums with Hersch in 1986 and 1987 preceded Short Stories, a collaboration between Janis Siegel and Hersch, co-led and co-produced with arrangements by Hersch, that got a nomination for her vocal performance in 1989. In 1992 finally Dancing in the Dark, his seventh trio recording and second for Chesky Records, was nominated for Best Jazz Instrumental Performance. Hersch is one of the Grammy artists with the most nominations (17) without a win.

- 1992: Best Jazz Instrumental Performance, Individual or Group for Dancing in the Dark
- 1995: Best Jazz Instrumental Performance, Individual or Group for I Never Told You: Fred Hersch Plays Johnny Mandel
- 2005: Best Instrumental Composition for "Valentine" (on In Amsterdam: Live at the Bimhuis)
- 2011: Best Jazz Instrumental Album for Alone at the Vanguard, and Best Improvised Jazz Solo for "Work"
- 2013: Best Improvised Jazz Solo for "Song Without Words No.4: Duet" with Julian Lage
- 2014: Best Jazz Instrumental Album for Floating (as the Fred Hersch Trio), and Best Improvised Jazz Solo for "You and the Night and the Music"
- 2016: Best Jazz Instrumental Album for Sunday Night at the Vanguard, and Best Improvised Jazz Solo for "We See"
- 2017: Best Jazz Instrumental Album for Open Book, and Best Improvised Jazz Solo for "Whisper Not"
- 2018: Best Jazz Instrumental Album for Live in Europe and Best Improvised Jazz Solo for "We See"
- 2019: Best Instrumental Composition for Begin Again
- 2023: Best jazz vocal album for Alive at the Village Vanguard and Best Improvised Jazz Solo for But Not For Me

== Critical response ==
DownBeat magazine described Hersch as "one of the small handful of brilliant musicians of his generation." The New York Times described him as "singular among the trailblazers of their art, a largely unsung innovator of this borderless, individualistic jazz – a jazz for the 21st century."

== Influence ==
Hersch's influence has been widely felt on a new generation of jazz pianists, from former Hersch students including Brad Mehldau, Ethan Iverson, Sullivan Fortner, Aaron Diehl and Dan Tepfer to his contemporary Jason Moran, who said: "Fred at the piano is like LeBron James on the basketball court. He's perfection."

== Personal life ==
=== Illness ===
In 1993, Hersch came out as gay and that he had been treated for HIV since 1984. He fell into a coma in 2008 for two months. When he regained consciousness, he had lost muscular function as a result of his long inactivity and could not play the piano. After rehabilitation, he was able to play again. In 2011, he performed My Coma Dreams, a stage show written and directed by Herschel Garfein about the contrast between dreams and reality.

=== Charity work ===
Hersch has been a spokesman and fund-raiser for AIDS services and education agencies since 1993. He has produced and performed on four benefit recordings and in numerous concerts for charities including Classical Action: Performing Arts Against AIDS, and Broadway Cares/Equity Fights AIDS, which had raised over $250,000 as of June 2013. In April 2016, he played a benefit concert for Buddhist Global Relief. He has also been a keynote speaker and performer at international medical conferences.

== Autobiography ==
Good Things Happen Slowly: A Life In and Out of Jazz, published in 2017

== Discography ==
=== As leader/co-leader ===
(Artists and labels are linked only once, at first appearance. Lineup can be sorted by "solo", "duo", "trio"... All trios are classic piano trios with (grand) piano, upright bass and drum kit, except for the trio Thirteen Ways, with saxophonist Michael Moore.)

Recording date	Title	Label	Year released	Personnel / Notes
1984-09	As One	JMT	1985	Duo with Jane Ira Bloom. live.
1984-10	Horizons	Concord Jazz	1985	Trio with Marc Johnson and Joey Baron
1986-12	Sarabande	Sunnyside	1987	Trio with Charlie Haden and Joey Baron
1988-05	E.T.C.	Red	1990	Trio E.T.C. with Steve LaSpina and Jeff Hirshfield
1989-12	Heartsongs	Sunnyside	1990	Trio with Michael Formanek and Jeff Hirshfield
1989?	The French Collection (Jazz Impressions of French Classics)	EMI Angel	1989	Trio with Steve LaSpina, Joey Baron and guests: James Newton, Kevin Eubanks, Toots Thielemans, Eddie Daniels
1989?	Short Stories	Atlantic	1989	Quartet co-led by Janis Siegel plus Harvie Swartz (bass) and Kris Yenny (cello); Siegel was a Grammy nominee for Best Jazz Vocal Performance
1990-08	Evanessence: A Tribute to Bill Evans	Evidence	1991	Trio with Michael Formanek or Marc Johnson, Jeff Hirshfield and guests: Gary Burton, Toots Thielemans
1991-03	E.T.C. Plus One	Red	1993	Quartet, trio E.T.C. with Steve LaSpina and Jeff Hirshfield plus Jerry Bergonzi (tenor saxophone). live.
1991-07	Forward Motion	Chesky	1991	with The Fred Hersch Group featuring Rich Perry (tenor sax), Erik Friedlander (cello), Scott Colley (bass) and Tom Rainey (drums)
1992-09, 1992-10	Red Square Blue: Jazz Impressions of Russian Composers	EMI Angel	1993	Trio with Steve LaSpina, Jeff Hirshfield and guests: James Newton, Toots Thielemans, Phil Woods, Erik Friedlander
1992-12	Dancing in the Dark	Chesky	1993	Trio with Drew Gress and Tom Rainey; Grammy nominee for Best Jazz Instrumental Performance, Individual or Group
1993-07	Concerto Pour Harmonica	TCB	1994	with Toots Thielemans, Christian Gavillet, Big Band de Lausanne, Orchestre de Chambre de Lausanne, Roby Seidel
1993-10	Fred Hersch at Maybeck	Concord Jazz	1994	Solo piano, in concert
1994-02	Plays...	Chesky	1994	Trio with Drew Gress and Tom Rainey
1994-05	Beautiful Love	Sunnyside	1995	Duo with Jay Clayton (vocals)
1994-09	I Never Told You: Fred Hersch Plays Johnny Mandel	Varèse Sarabande	1996	Solo piano; Grammy nominee for Best Jazz Instrumental Performance, Individual or Group
1995-03	Point in Time	Enja	1995	Trio with Drew Gress and Tom Rainey, and quintet adding Dave Douglas (trumpet), Rich Perry (tenor saxophone) on half of the tracks
1995?	Slow Hot Wind	Varèse Sarabande	1995	Duo with Janis Siegel, and quartet with Tony Dumas and Ralph Penland added
1995-06	Thirteen Ways	GM	1997	Trio Thirteen Ways with Michael Moore and Gerry Hemingway
1995-06, 1995-08	Passion Flower - The Music of Billy Strayhorn	Nonesuch	1996	Trio with Drew Gress and Tom Rainey plus string orchestra conducted by Eric Stern; one track is a duo with Nurit Tilles (piano); Andy Bey (vocals) added for one track
1996-01	Plays Rodgers & Hammerstein	Nonesuch	1996	Solo piano
1997-02	Thelonious: Fred Hersch Plays Monk	Nonesuch	1998	Solo piano
1997-07	'97 @ The Village Vanguard	Palmetto	2018	Trio with Drew Gress and Tom Rainey in concert
1997-07	The Duo Album	Classical Action	1997	Duos with Gary Burton, Joe Lovano, Diana Krall, Tommy Flanagan, Andy Bey, Tom Rainey, Lee Konitz, Jim Hall, Drew Gress, Kenny Barron, Tom Harrell, Janis Siegel
1998?	Songs We Know	Nonesuch	1998	Duo with Bill Frisell (guitar)
1998-10	Let Yourself Go: Live at Jordan Hall	Nonesuch	1999	Solo piano, in concert
1999	Focus	Palmetto	1999	Trio Thirteen Ways with Michael Moore and Gerry Hemingway
1999-10	4 in Perspective	Village Life	2000	Quartet with Norma Winstone (vocals), Kenny Wheeler (trumpet) and Paul Clarvis (percussion)
2001	Songs without Words	Nonesuch	2001	Solo, with few duo, trio and quintet tracks. [3CD] Vol. 1 with originals, 2nd with standards and 3rd tributed to Cole Porter.
2002-05	Live at the Village Vanguard	Palmetto	2002	Trio with Drew Gress and Nasheet Waits in concert
2002-07	Songs and Lullabies	Sunnyside	2003	Duo with Norma Winstone; three tracks with Gary Burton added
2003-05	In Amsterdam: Live at the Bimhuis	Palmetto	2005	Solo piano, in concert; Grammy nomination for Best Instrumental Composition for "Valentine"
2003-09	Fred Hersch Trio + 2	Palmetto	2004	Quintet with Drew Gress, Nasheet Waits plus Ralph Alessi (trumpet, flugelhorn) and Tony Malaby (tenor sax)
2003-10	This We Know	Palmetto	2008	Duo with Michael Moore
2003?	Soothing the Senses	Sensory Resources	2003	Solo piano
2004-10	Live at Jazz Standard	Maxjazz	2006	Duo with Nancy King; Grammy nomination for Best Jazz Vocal Album
2005?	Leaves of Grass	Palmetto	2005	Octet with four horns featuring vocalists Kurt Elling and Kate McGarry; lyrics by Walt Whitman
2006-12	Night & the Music	Palmetto	2007	Trio with Drew Gress and Nasheet Waits
2007-06	Concert Music 2001-2006	Naxos	2007	Solo, duo and trio interpretations of compositions by Hersch with pianists Natasha Paremski, Blair McMillen, the Gramercy Trio, and Hersch himself with cellist Dorothy Lawson on one track
2009?	Live at Jazz Standard	Sunnyside	2009	with the Fred Hersch Pocket Orchestra featuring Ralph Alessi (trumpet), Richie Barshay (percussion) and Jo Lawry (vocals)
2009?	Plays Jobim	Sunnyside	2009	Solo piano
2010-01	Whirl	Palmetto	2010	Trio with John Hébert and Eric McPherson
2010-05	Everybody's Song but My Own	Venus	2011	Trio with John Hébert and Eric McPherson
2010-11 – 2010-12	Alone at the Vanguard	Palmetto	2011	Solo piano; Grammy Award nominations for Best Jazz Instrumental Album and Best Improvised Jazz Solo for "Work"; DownBeat named it one of the Best CDs of 2012
2012?	Da Vinci	Bee Jazz	2012	Duo with Nico Gori
2012	Alive at the Vanguard	Palmetto	2012	Trio with John Hébert and Eric McPherson. [2CD]
2012?	Two Hands/Ten Voices	Broadway Cares	2012	Duos with Karrin Allyson, Judy Blazer, Ann Hampton Callaway, Kate McGarry, Jessica Molaskey, Jane Monheit, Janis Siegel, Carol Sloane, Luciana Souza, Norma Winstone
2012-05	Fun House	Songlines	2013	with Benoît Delbecq and Fred Hersch Double Trio
2011-06, 2012-05	Only Many	CAM Jazz	2013	Duo with Ralph Alessi
2013-02	Free Flying	Palmetto	2013	Duo with Julian Lage (guitar), in concert; Grammy Award nomination for Best Improvised Jazz Solo for "Song Without Words #4: Duet"
2014?	Floating	Palmetto	2014	Trio with John Hébert and Eric McPherson; Two Grammy Award nominees for Best Jazz Instrumental Album and Best Improvised Jazz Solo for "You and the Night and the Music"
2014-08	Solo	Palmetto	2015	Solo piano, in concert "Windham Chamber Music Festivals 2014"
2016-03	Sunday Night at the Vanguard	Palmetto	2016	Trio with John Hébert and Eric McPherson; Grammy nomination for Best Jazz Instrumental Album and Best Improvised Jazz Solo for "We See"
2016-03	Open Book	Palmetto	2017	Solo piano
2016-06	Live in Healdsburg	Anzic	2018	Duo with Anat Cohen, in concert "Healdsburg Jazz Festival"
2017-11	Live in Europe	Palmetto	2018	Trio with John Hébert and Eric McPherson; Grammy nominee for Best Jazz Instrumental Album and Best Improvised Jazz Solo for "We See" (again)
2018-10	Alive at the Village Vanguard	Palmetto	2023	Duo with Esperanza Spalding
2019–01 – 2019–02	Begin Again	Palmetto	2019	with WDR Big Band, arranged and conducted by Vince Mendoza
2020-08	Songs from Home	Palmetto	2020	Solo piano
2021-08	Breath By Breath	Palmetto	2022	with Crosby Street String Quartet, Drew Gress, and Jochen Rückert
2021-11	The Song Is You	ECM	2022	Duo with Enrico Rava
2023-04	Silent, Listening	ECM	2024	Solo piano
2024-05	The Surrounding Green	ECM	2025	Trio with Drew Gress and Joey Baron

=== As sideman/featured soloist ===
Year released	Artist	Album title	Label	Notes
1979	Art Farmer	Yama	CTI	with Joe Henderson
1979	Billy Harper	Billy Harper Quintet in Europe	Soul Note	
1979	Billy Harper	The Awakening	Marge	
1979	Sam Jones	Something New	Interplay	
1981	Art Farmer	A Work of Art	Concord Jazz	Grammy Nominee for Best Jazz Instrumental Performance, Group
1982	Jane Ira Bloom	Mighty Lights	Enja	with Charlie Haden and Ed Blackwell
1982	Art Farmer	Mirage	Soul Note	
1983	Art Farmer	Warm Valley	Concord Jazz	
1985	Art Farmer	You Make Me Smile	Soul Note	
1986	Eddie Daniels	Breakthrough	GRP	with The London Philharmonia; Grammy Nominee for Best Jazz Instrumental Performance, Soloist
1987	Jane Ira Bloom	Modern Drama	Columbia	
1987	Tony Dagradi	Sweet Remembrance	Gramavision	
1987	Eddie Daniels	To Bird with Love	GRP	Grammy Nominee for Best Jazz Instrumental Performance, Soloist and Best Jazz Instrumental Performance, Group
1987	Toots Thielemans	Ne Me Quitte Pas - Do Not Leave Me	Milan/Stash	with Marc Johnson and Joey Baron
1987	Roseanna Vitro	A Quiet Place	Skyline	
1987	Jimmy McGary	Palindrome	Mopro	with Michael Moore and Joey Baron
1988	Meredith D'Ambrosio	The Cove	Sunnyside	
1988	Jane Ira Bloom	Slalom	Columbia	
1988	Toots Thielemans	Only Trust Your Heart	Concord Jazz	
1988	Lee Konitz	Round & Round	Musicmasters	
1988	Jon Metzger	Into The Light	V.S.O.P. Records	
1989	Michael Bocian	Go Groove	GM Recordings	
1990	Johnny Mathis	In a Sentimental Mood: Mathis Sings Ellington	Columbia	Grammy Nominee for Best Traditional Pop Performance
1990	Judy Niemack	Long As You're Living	Freelance	
1991	Jeri Brown	Mirage	Justin Time	
1992	Matt Kendrick	Other Aspects	Suitcase	
1992	Michael Moore quintet	Home Game	Ramboy	
1992	Harumi Kaneko	Try To Remember	Philips	
1992	Jack Jones	The Gershwin Album	Columbia/Legacy	
1992	Various artists (Ana Caram, Paquito D'Rivera, Tom Harrell, and Phil Woods)	JVC Jazz Festival Presents a Night of Chesky Jazz Live	Chesky	
1993	Jeanfrançois Prins & Judy Niemack	Beauty and the Prince	AMC (new release 2003 GAM)	
1993	Roseanna Vitro	Softly	Concord Jazz	
1993	The Matt Kendrick Unit	Composite	Ichiban	
1993	Garrison Fewell	A Blue Deeper Than The Blue	Accurate Records	
1994	Leny Andrade	Maiden Voyage	Chesky	
1994	Various artists	The AIDS Quilt Songbook	Nightengale/Harmonia Mundi	featured with an original composition accompanying baritone William Sharp
1994	Various artists	Memento Bittersweet	Catalyst	featured on "Tango Bittersweet"
1994	Michael Moore	Chicotoumi	Ramboy	
1994	Byron Olson	Sketches of Coltrane	Angel	featured on tracks 6-11
1994	Various artists	Last Night When We Were Young: The Ballad Album	Classical Action	featured on tracks 1, 3, 5, 6, 9, 11, 12, 13
1995	Royce Campbell With Strings	Waltz for Debby	Paddle Wheel	
1995	Paul Sundfor	Nascency	Nine Winds Records	
1995	Chris Connor	Lover Come Back to Me: Live at Sweet Basil	Evidence	recorded on September 25, 1981
1995	Dick Sisto	American Love Song	Jazzen	
1996	Jane Ira Bloom	The Nearness	Arabesque	
1996	Michael Callen	Legacy	Significant Other	featured on three tracks
1996	Dawn Upshaw	Sings Rodgers and Hart	Nonesuch	
1996	The Rich Perry Quartet	What is This?	SteepleChase	
1996	Bonnie Lowdermilk	This Heart Of Mine	AxolOtl Jazz	with Drew Gress and Tom Rainey
1996	Michael Callen	Legacy	Significant Other Records	featured on three tracks
1997	Dominique Eade	When The Wind Was Cool	RCA Victor	featured on tracks 3, 4, 6, 8, 10, 11
1997	Gary Burton	Departure	Concord Jazz	with John Scofield, John Patitucci and Peter Erskine
1997	Various artists	George Delerue: Music from the Films of François Truffaut	Nonesuch	featured on two tracks
1997	Various artists	September Songs: The Music Of Kurt Weill		featured on "Speak Low"
1998	Michael Moore Trio	Bering	Ramboy	
1998	Kelley Johnson	Make Someone Happy	Pipe DreamChartmaker	featured on tracks 1, 3, 5, 9, 10, 13
1998	Steve LaSpina	Distant Dream	Stepplechase	
1999	Jane Ira Bloom	The Red Quartets	Arabesque	
1999	Barbara Sfraga	Oh, What A Thrill	Naxos Jazz	featured on tracks 3, 8, 12
1999	Dawn Upshaw	Sings Vernon Duke	Nonesuch	featured on four tracks
1999	Roseanna Vitro	The Time of My Life: Roseanna Vitro Sings the Songs of Steve Allen	See Breeze	recorded 1986
1999	Janis Siegel	The Tender Trap	Monarch Records	
2000	Mary Pearson	You And I	Arkadia Jazz	
2001	Roseanna Vitro	Conviction: Thoughts of Bill Evans	A-Records	featured on tracks 2, 3, 8
2001	Various artists	The Richard Rodgers Centennial Jazz Piano Album	Broadway Cares	featured on tracks 5, 6
2003	Jane Ira Bloom	Chasing Paint	Arabesque	
2003	Harvey Mason	Trios: With All My Heart	VideoArts	featured on one track
2003	Luciana Souza	Norte e Sul - North and South	Biscoito Fino/Sunnyside	featured on tracks 4, 5; Grammy Nominee for Best Jazz Vocal Album
2003	Andrew Sterman	Blue Canvas with Spiral	Breath River Music	
2005	Renée Fleming	Haunted Heart	Decca	with Bill Frisell
2005	Kate McGarry	Mercy Streets	Palmetto	featured on tracks 6, 9
2006	Audra McDonald	Build A Bridge	Nonesuch	featured on track 6
2013	3 Cohens	Tightrope	Anzic	with Anat Cohen, Avishai Cohen and Yuval Cohen
2014	Jill Sobule	Charms	Pink Records	featured on "Lonely Eighty-Eight"
2014	Amy London	Bridges	FiveCut Recordings	featured on tracks 1-8
2014	Scott Morgan	Songs Of life	Miranda Music	
2018	Lorraine Feather	Math Camp	Relarion Inc.	featured on tracks 2, 3, 5, 9
2019	Adrian Cunningham	Adrian Cunningham & His Friends Play Lerner & Loewe	Arbors Records	
2020	Brian Landrus	For Now	BlueLand Records	
2020	Will Vinson	Four Forty One	Whirlwind Recordings	featured on "Work"
2025	Rondi Charleston	Suspended In Time	Resilience Music Alliance	

== See also ==
- LGBTQ representation in jazz
- List of jazz pianists
