= Nancy King (jazz singer) =

American singer (1940–2025)

- Born: Nancy Ellen Whalley; June 15, 1940; Lane County, Oregon, U.S.
- Origin: Portland, Oregon, U.S.
- Died: August 5, 2025 (aged 85) Portland, Oregon, U.S.
- Genres: Bebop, vocal jazz
- Occupation: Vocalist
- Instrument: Vocals
- Website: Official website

Nancy Ellen King (née Whalley; June 15, 1940 – August 5, 2025) was an American jazz singer from Portland, Oregon. Known for her masterful scatting and elastic range, King performed on worldwide tours and recordings, as well as collaborations with such artists as Jon Hendricks, Vince Guaraldi, Glen Moore, Ralph Towner, Dave Friesen, and others.

== Background ==
King was born Nancy Ellen Whalley on June 15, 1940, on her family's farm in rural Lane County, Oregon, about 18 miles (29 km) outside of Springfield. When she was eight, she and her family moved to nearby Eugene, Oregon. Both of her parents were musicians.

== Career ==
She enrolled at the University of Oregon, where she began gigging with fellow music students. After moving to San Francisco in 1960, her accomplished scat singing landed her many gigs with various bebop artists. Early in her career, began a relationship with saxophonist Sonny King and took his surname, though they never legally married. In 1978, she released her first album, First Date.

Though The New York Times called her "one of the country's most admired jazz vocalists", she refused opportunities that would have brought her a higher profile or greater celebrity. As an example, she once turned down a lucrative recording contract because it would have diverted her career from her improvisational style and her regular collaborators. In an interview, she said she was proud to have not "sold out".

In 2004, King recorded her live album Live at Jazz Standard with pianist Fred Hersch, which was nominated for the Grammy Award for Best Jazz Vocal Album. The 2017 album Porter Plays Porter, featuring her alongside the Randy Porter Trio performing Cole Porter music, was also nominated for the Grammy. She continued to perform until at least 2019.

== Personal life and death ==
Nancy and Sonny King had three sons before separating. She lived in Portland, Oregon, and died from breast cancer at a care home there on August 5, 2025, at the age of 85.

== Discography ==
- First Date, with Steve Wolfe (Inner City, 1978)
- Impending Bloom, with Glen Moore (Justice, 1991)
- Potato Radio, with Glen Moore (Justice, 1992)
- Cliff Dance, with Glen Moore (Justice, 1993)
- Straight into Your Heart, with Steve Christofferson and the Metropole Orchestra (Mons, 1996)
- King on the Road (Cardas, 1999)
- Moonray (Philology, 1999)
- Dream Lands Vol. 1, with Steve Christofferson (Stellar!, 2000)
- Dream Lands Vol. 2, with Steve Christofferson (Stellar!, 2002)
- Live at the Jazz Standard, with Fred Hersch (Maxjazz, 2006)
- Perennial (Ornry Diva, 2011)

=== Guest appearances ===
With Karrin Allyson

- Footprints (Concord Jazz, 2006)

With Ray Brown

- Christmas Songs with the Ray Brown Trio (Telarc, 1999)
- Some of My Best Friends Are Singers (Telarc, 1998)

With Roy Nathanson

- Fire at Keaton's Bar and Grill (Six Degrees, 2000)

With Oregon

- 45th Parallel (Portrait, 1989)
