= Set the Alarm for Monday =

Set The Alarm For Monday

Studio album by Bobby Previte & The New Bump
- Released: May 13, 2008
- Recorded: August 2007 at Maggie's Farm with Matt Balitsaris
- Genre: Jazz
- Length: 48:39
- Label: Palmetto
- Producer: Bobby Previte

Professional ratings
Review scores
Source	Rating
All About Jazz link Jazz Times link Allmusic	3.5/5 stars

Set The Alarm For Monday is a studio album by New York City jazz drummer Bobby Previte & The New Bump. Composition and arrangement is credited to Previte. "The New Bump" refers to a prior Bobby Previte ensemble "Bump the Renaissance" of 1998. The New Bump includes Ellery Eskelin on tenor saxophone, Steve Bernstein on trumpet, Bill Ware on vibraphone, Brad Jones on bass, Jim Pugliese on percussion and Previte on drums.

The tracks are composed as a suite. Also, the provocative song titles and suspenseful recordings "suggest an evocative film-noir atmosphere".

== Track listing ==
1. "Set The Alarm for Monday" 4:28
2. "I'd Advise You Not to Miss Your Train" 5:39
3. "She Has Information" 4:32
4. "Were You Followed?" 3:43
5. "I'm On Tto Her" 4:28
6. "There Was Something In My Drink" 6:06
7. "You're In Over Your Head" 5:44
8. "Drive South, Along the Canyon" 5:08
9. "Wake Up Andrea, We're Pulling In" 8:46"
