= Angelus Novus (album) =

Studio album by John Zorn
- Released: January 20, 1998
- Recorded: June, 1992–April 15, 1997
- Genre: Avant-garde, contemporary classical music
- Length: 47:30
- Label: Tzadik TZ 7028
- Producer: Stephen Drury

John Zorn chronology
Euclid's Nightmare (1997)	Angelus Novus (1998)	Masada: Tet (1998)

Angelus Novus is an album of contemporary classical music by American composer and alto saxophonist/multi-instrumentalist John Zorn including compositions written in 1972 ("Christabel"), and 1983 ("For Your Eyes Only").

== Reception ==
The Allmusic review by Stacia Proefrock awarded the album 3 stars stating "the whole album, while not shining with the crystalline perfection of his best work, is a solid example of thoughtful composition".

Professional ratings
Review scores
Source	Rating
Allmusic	3/5 stars

== Track listing ==
All compositions by John Zorn.

1. "For Your Eyes Only" - 13:43
2. "Christabel: Part 1" - 4:04
3. "Christabel: Part 2" - 3:47
4. "Carny" - 12:54
5. "Angelus Novus: Peshat" - 2:05
6. "Angelus Novus: Tzomet" - 1:24
7. "Angelus Novus: Aliya" - 4:35
8. "Angelus Novus: Herut" - 1:46
9. "Angelus Novus: Pardes" - 2:53

Recorded at New England Conservatory's Jordan Hall, Boston in June, 1992 (track 3), on February 6, 1996 (track 1), November 18, 1996 (tracks 2–3) and April 15, 1997 (tracks 5–9)

== Personnel ==
- The Callithumpian Consort of the New England Conservatory
- Stephen Drury: Artistic Director, Piano
