= Mental Weather =

Studio album by Jane Ira Bloom
- Released: January 30, 2008
- Recorded: June 1–2, 2007
- Studios: Avatar, New York City
- Genre: Jazz
- Length: 50:59
- Label: Outline Records
- Producer: Jane Ira Bloom

Jane Ira Bloom chronology
Like Silver, Like Song (2005)	Mental Weather (2008)	Wingwalker (2011)

Professional ratings
Review scores
Source	Rating
All About Jazz	4.5/5 stars
AllMusic	4.5/5 stars
The Buffalo News	3.5/4 stars
Tom Hull	B+

Mental Weather is a studio album by american jazz saxophonist Jane Ira Bloom. The album was released on January 30, 2008 by Outline Records label.

== Reception ==
Mike Shanley of JazzTimes commented, "Mental Weather begins and ends delicately, with Jane Ira Bloom’s soprano sax dueting with pianist Dawn Clement, and later standing alone, playing the standard “This Nearly Was Mine” following an original rumination. In both situations, Bloom’s engaging tone and sense of lyricism come across in the first few notes, which indicates why she has been such a highly regarded and lauded musician. And whether the album sticks to that subdued approach or amps things up a bit, the performance keeps the interest level high." All About Jazz 's John Kelman stated, "Cleverly skirting the edges of the avant without losing sight of the importance of melody, Mental Weather is a compelling evolutionary set for Bloom, whose career continues to be marked by gradual but inexorable growth." Michael G. Nastos of AllMusic noted, "This is a complete and wonderful recording from start to finish, track-to-track, and continues to proffer the notion that Jane Ira Bloom is at the peak of her formative powers. It's a project that cannot come more highly recommended." The Buffalo News 's Jeff Simon added, "There are no bad Jane Ira Bloom records. She's a national treasure. One way or another, every new disc of hers proves it."

== Track listing ==
All tracks are written by Jane Ira Bloom except track 9 written by Oscar Hammerstein II and Richard Rodgers.

No.	Title	Length
1.	"A More Beautiful Question"	5:27
2.	"Ready for Anything"	6:10
3.	"Multiple Choice"	6:13
4.	"Mental Weather"	4:21
5.	"Luminous Bridges"	5:12
6.	"Electrochemistry"	3:49
7.	"Cello on the Inside"	5:56
8.	"What to Wear: Activewear, Easy Knit, The Reasons for Returns, Clothes That Question"	7:10
9.	"First Thoughts / This Nearly Was Mine"	6:05
Total length:		50:59

== Personnel ==
- Jane Ira Bloom – soprano saxophone
- Mark Helias – double bass
- Matt Wilson – drums, percussion
- Dawn Clement – piano, electric piano
