= Sometimes the Magic =

Studio album by Jane Ira Bloom
- Released: March 6, 2001
- Recorded: June 28–29 and July 21, 2000
- Studio: Current Sound, New York City
- Genre: Jazz
- Length: 52:15
- Label: Arabesque; AJ-0155
- Producer: Jane Ira Bloom

Jane Ira Bloom chronology
The Red Quartets (1997)	Sometimes the Magic (2001)	Chasing Paint (2003)

Sometimes the Magic is an album by saxophonist Jane Ira Bloom which was recorded in 2000 and released on the Arabesque label the following year.

== Reception ==
Professional ratings
Review scores
Source	Rating
AllMusic	3/5 stars
The Buffalo News	3.5/4 stars
Tom Hull	B+
The Penguin Guide to Jazz	3.5/4 stars

The AllMusic review by Glenn Astarita said "Jane Ira Bloom looms as one of the most important soprano saxophonists in modern jazz. Armed with a distinctive tone and a proclivity to execute serpentine lines amid various tremolo and vibrato techniques, the artist also reaps the benefits of a topnotch rhythm section on this 2001 release". On All About Jazz, Jim Santella stated "Most of the session allows for the passing of creative ideas back and forth between the four artists, keeping the mood quiet and making room for quiet contemplation. Bloom's gorgeous saxophone tone and unique method of presentation makes this and her live performances a special treat" Jeff Simon of The Buffalo News added, "With the sonorous Mark Dresser on bass and Vincent Bourgey replacing Fred Hersch on piano, this is a group that, if it played anywhere locally, would be worth braving rain, sleet, snow and dead of night to hear. They are, on record, as impressive as can be and a constant surprise."

== Track listing ==
All compositions by Jane Ira Bloom except where noted

1. "Denver Snap" – 5:08
2. "Now You See It" – 5:23
3. "Bewitched, Bothered and Bewildered" (Richard Rodgers, Lorenz Hart) – 3:03
4. "Blue Poles" – 5:45
5. "Pacific" – 4:53
6. "Truth in Timbre" – 5:28
7. "Without Words" – 4:36
8. "In Everything" – 4:20
9. "Varo" – 5:26
10. "Many Landscapes" – 4:19
11. "How Are Things in Glocca Morra?" (Burton Lane, Yip Harburg) – 3:50

== Personnel ==
- Jane Ira Bloom – soprano saxophone, live electronics
- Vincent Bourgeyx – piano
- Mark Dresser – double bass
- Bobby Previte – drums
