= Art and Aviation =

Studio album by Jane Ira Bloom
- Released: 1992
- Recorded: July 22 & 23, 1992
- Studio: Clinton Recording Studios, New York City
- Genre: Jazz
- Length: 53:55
- Label: Arabesque; AJ-0107
- Producer: Jane Ira Bloom

Jane Ira Bloom chronology
Slalom (1988)	Art and Aviation (1992)	The Nearness (1996)

Art and Aviation is an album by American saxophonist Jane Ira Bloom that was recorded in 1992 and released on the Arabesque label.

== Reception ==
Professional ratings
Review scores
Source	Rating
AllMusic	4/5 stars
The Buffalo News	4/4 stars
Tom Hull	B+
The Penguin Guide to Jazz	3.5/4 stars

The AllMusic review by David R. Adler said: "Art & Aviation is not only one of Jane Ira Bloom's finest albums, it is also a remarkably successful (and fairly early) attempt to bring electronic influences to bear on acoustic jazz. Bloom's writing is strongly infused with a straight-ahead jazz aesthetic. But she veers left on many cuts, altering her soprano sax sound with live electronics ... While most tracks still sound very much like jazz, the electronics, while never becoming obtrusive, give everything an unpredictable edge ... The complex, angular soprano/trumpet unison lines heard on many of the pieces call to mind the harmonically free sound of Ornette Coleman's early recordings with Don Cherry. ... But Bloom is not copying Coleman at all; rather, just as Coleman did, she is pushing jazz into new, similarly controversial areas, without sacrificing musicality for a second." Jeff Simon of The Buffalo News noted: " Certainly, she is among the precious few to marry jazz and the sonorities of classical new music with total lack of affectation."

== Track listing ==
All compositions by Jane Ira Bloom, except where noted

1. "Gateway to Progress" – 5:26
2. "Further into the Night" – 6:48
3. "Hawkins' Parallel Universe" – 6:51
4. "Straight, No Chaser / Miro" (Thelonious Monk / Bloom) – 5:45
5. "Oshumare" – 8:00
6. "Art & Aviation" – 7:12
7. "Most Distant Galaxy" – 8:09
8. "I Believe Anita" – 5:56
9. "Lost in the Stars" (Kurt Weill, Maxwell Anderson) – 3:51

== Personnel ==
- Jane Ira Bloom – soprano saxophone, live electronics
- Kenny Wheeler – flugelhorn, trumpet (tracks 1, 2, 4–6 & 8)
- Ron Horton – trumpet (tracks 2–4)
- Kenny Werner – piano (tracks 2 & 5)
- Michael Formanek – bass (tracks 1, 3, 6 & 8)
- Rufus Reid – bass (tracks 2, 4, 5 & 7)
- Jerry Granelli – drums, elektro-acoustic percussion (tracks 1–8)
