= Live at Jazz Standard (Nancy King album) =

Live album by Nancy King with Fred Hersch
- Released: May 9, 2006
- Recorded: October 23, 2004
- Venue: Jazz Standard, New York City
- Genre: Jazz
- Length: 1:13:21
- Label: Maxjazz
- Producer: Fred Hersch

Nancy King chronology
The Dream Lands, Vol. 2: The CBC Sessions (2002)	Live at Jazz Standard (2006)	Perennial (2011)

Fred Hersch chronology
In Amsterdam: Live at the Bimhuis (2005)	Live at Jazz Standard (2006)	Night & the Music (2007)

Live at Jazz Standard is 2006 live album by the jazz singer Nancy King accompanied by the pianist Fred Hersch.

The album was recorded without King's knowledge by Hersch; and the pair had never met before making the album. Live at the Jazz Standard was part of a series of duo performances between Hersch and various performers.

== Reception ==
Professional ratings
Review scores
Source	Rating
Allmusic	4.5/5 stars

Ken Dryden reviewed the album for Allmusic and wrote that "King and Hersch put together a wide-ranging program...frequently extending their interpretations well beyond the expectations for a vocal/piano duo" and that Hersch was "never less than brilliant throughout the evening, though the singer is equally impressive, an adventurous spirit who is unafraid of taking chances". Dryden felt that King's version of "Four" "clearly steals the show". This beautifully recorded set is a tribute to the musicianship of both artists".

Reviewing the album for the Jazz Times, Harvey Siders wrote that "There aren't enough adjectives in Roget's Thesaurus to do this album justice. It embodies everything that’s right, healthy and fun about jazz". Siders commented that King's "...amazing ability to scat covers her freakish range from alto to infinity". Siders highlighted "Ain't Misbehavin" and "Four" as featuring Hersch and King trading "unforgettable swinging choruses".

Andrew Velez reviewed Live at Jazz Standard for All About Jazz and wrote that "King's voice at times can sound like a newly created instrument, maybe a trumpsaxtrombone? On "I Fall in Love Too Easily, she spotlighted each word in "I've been well schooled in the past differently, sometimes suddenly going deep and then shifting with nary a pause to a high, light sound. The impressive thing was the rightness of her choices, those separate enunciations as emotional and musical illuminations, whether a foghorn blast on "too fast or a trombone boom on "I fall in love...." Velez highlighted the "masterful bit of give and take as Hersch responded keys in hand to each nuance of King's vocal twists and turns" on "We'll Be Together Again".

== Track listing ==
1. "There's a Small Hotel" (Lorenz Hart, Richard Rodgers) – 7:08
2. "I Fall in Love Too Easily" (Sammy Cahn, Jule Styne) – 8:11
3. "My Little Suede Shoes"/"Day by Day" (Charlie Parker)/(Cahn, Axel Stordahl, Paul Weston) – 5:34
4. "Everything Happens to Me" (Tom Adair, Matt Dennis) – 8:34
5. "Ain't Misbehavin'" (Harry Brooks, Andy Razaf, Fats Waller) – 5:43
6. "If You Never Come to Me (Inútil Paisagem)" (Ray Gilbert, Antonio Carlos Jobim) – 9:19
7. "There Will Never Be Another You" (Mack Gordon, Harry Warren) – 7:10
8. "Autumn in New York" (Vernon Duke) – 10:51
9. "Four" (Miles Davis, Jon Hendricks) – 10:51

== Personnel ==
Musicians

- Nancy King – vocals
- Fred Hersch – piano, arranger

Production

- Fred Hersch – producer, liner notes
- Martin Goodman – engineer, mixing
- Pressley Jacobs – art direction, design
- David Bartolomi – photography
- Frank Stewart – photography
