= Mighty Lights =

Studio album by Jane Ira Bloom
- Released: 1983
- Recorded: November 17–18, 1982
- Studio: Vanguard Studios, NYC
- Genre: Jazz
- Length: 39:10
- Label: Enja
- Producer: Matthias Winckelmann

Jane Ira Bloom chronology
Second Wind (1980)	Mighty Lights (1983)	As One (1985)

Professional ratings
Review scores
Source	Rating
AllMusic	3/5 stars
DownBeat	5/5 stars
Tom Hull	B+
The Penguin Guide to Jazz	3/4 stars

Mighty Lights is a studio album by American jazz saxophonist Jane Ira Bloom. The album was released in 1983 by Enja label. The album also features Fred Hersch on piano, Charlie Haden on bass, and Ed Blackwell on drums.

== Reception ==
AllMusic's Chris Kelsey wrote, " Bloom's control over the horn was occasionally dubious, but she evidenced an attractive tone and a coherent (if a bit immature and self-conscious) manner of phrasing. Her tunes were already quite sophisticated and distinctive, pointing to the even more ambitious composer into which she evolved. On the other hand, her band for this album will probably not be excelled for the rest of her career." Writers of Jazzwomen: Conversations with Twenty-one Musicians stated that the album "established her as a new voice to be reckoned with on the soprano saxophone."

== Track listing ==
All tracks are written by Jane Ira Bloom except track 2 written by Kurt Weill and Maxwell Anderson.

No.	Title	Length
1.	"2-5-1"	6:57
2.	"Lost in the Stars"	7:07
3.	"I Got Rhythm But No Melody"	5:53
4.	"The Man with Glasses"	6:10
5.	"Change Up"	7:00
6.	"Mighty Lights"	6:03
Total length:		39:10

== Personnel ==
- Jane Ira Bloom – soprano saxophone
- Fred Hersch – piano
- Charlie Haden – bass
- Ed Blackwell – drums
