= Badawi =

In Arabic onomastics (nisbah), Al-Badawi (البدوي) or simply Badawi (بدوي) denotes a relationship to or from Bedouin areas (and may consequently imply 'rustic'). It is both a given name and a surname. Notable people with the name include:

- Ahmad al-Badawi, a saint in Islam
- Al-Baydawi, philosopher and mufassir
- Jamal al-Bedawi, also written Jamal al-Badawi, a contemporary Yemeni accused and convicted of planning the USS Cole Bombing
- Jamal Badawi, Egyptian-born Canadian professor and author
- Abdel Hamid Badawi, Egyptian jurist and Foreign Minister
- Abdullah Ahmad Badawi, Malaysia's fifth prime minister
- Abdel Rahman Badawi, Egyptian existentialist philosopher
- El-Sayyid el-Badawi, Egyptian businessman and the President of Al-Wafd Party
- Fares Badawi, Palestinian judoka
- Helmy Bahgat Badawi, first chairman of the Suez Canal Authority
- Mohamed Badawi, Sudanese linguist and publisher, singer and composer
- Mohsen Badawi, Egyptian entrepreneur, political activist, and writer
- Nadia Badawi, Egyptian-born Australian medical researcher, specialising in cerebral palsy
- Raif Badawi, Saudi Arabian blogger and prisoner of conscience
- Samar Badawi, Saudi Arabian human rights activist
- Zaki Badawi, Muslim scholar
- Zeinab Badawi, British newsreader and broadcaster

Given name:

- Badawi al-Jabal, a Syrian poet

Prof Lutfullah Badawi Writer, Poet, based in Pakistan

Other:

- Stage name of Israeli composer Raz Mesinai

== See also ==
- Al-Badawi
- Bedouin
