= Alive at the Village Vanguard =

Live album by Fred Hersch, Esperanza Spalding
- Released: 6 January 2023
- Recorded: 19–21 October 2018
- Venue: Village Vanguard, NYC
- Genre: Jazz
- Length: 67:30
- Label: Palmetto
- Producer: Fred Hersch, Esperanza Spalding

Esperanza Spalding chronology
Live at the Detroit Jazz Festival (2022)	Alive at the Village Vanguard (2023)	Milton + esperanza (2024)

Professional ratings
Review scores
Source	Rating
All About Jazz	4.5/5 stars
Allmusic	4.5/5 stars
Jazzwise	3/5 stars

Alive at the Village Vanguard is a collaborative live album by pianist Fred Hersch and jazz singer Esperanza Spalding. Palmetto Records released the album on 6 January 2023.

== Background ==
The album marks Hersch's sixth release recorded in the storied venue. He explained, "This recording sounds like you’re in the best seat in the Vanguard for a very live experience. You can really feel the vitality of the room, of the audience, and of our interplay. We decided on the word Alive for the album title as you can really feel the intimacy and energy of the performances." Hersch rarely performs alongside vocalists, and his joint appearances with Esperanza Spalding have remained few and far between since their initial collaboration in 2013. Spalding does not play a bass here, performing vocal parts only.

In their interview for DownBeat, both artists underlined that their partnership feels especially natural because they treat improvisation as a kind of composition and see jazz as a broad, living language rather than a narrow style.

== Reception ==
Matt Collar of AllMusic wrote, "Alive at the Village Vanguard captures pianist Fred Hersch and vocalist Esperanza Spalding in an intimate yet inventively expressive duo performance. On first glance, the combination of Hersch (a veteran performer known for his lyrical standards work) and Spalding (a virtuoso bassist and singer known for her highly conceptual, genre-bending albums) may seem like an odd pairing." A reviewer of Jazz Trail commented, "Without major arrangements, this piano-voice duo recording captured live at New York's Village Vanguard, shows off the many musical qualities of Fred Hersch and Esperanza Spalding. The pair imbues most of the tunes with a quirky perspective and humor, but I felt this work more as an audience entertainment rather than an audio recording to be revisited."

Jeff Tamarkin writing for Relix added, "Eight numbers, most of them standards from one era or another, were recorded up close and personal, sans any embellishment, albeit with audience sounds left intact as nature intended." Jon W. Poses of Chicago Daily Tribune commented, "There are a lot of things that really make listening to and absorbing the compressed session wonderful, but what stands out to me is the overall whimsical, fanciful aesthetic — it’s omnipresent. These two are really at ease with each other’s musical quirks, twists and turns."

The album received two Grammy award nominations: Best Jazz Performance (for "But Not For Me") and Best Jazz Vocal Album.

== Track listing ==
No.	Title	Writer(s)	Length
1.	"But Not for Me"	George Gershwin, Ira Gershwin	9:32
2.	"Dream of Monk"	Fred Hersch	7:36
3.	"Little Suede Shoes"	Charlie Parker	9:03
4.	"Girl Talk"	Bobby Troup, Neal Hefti	12:03
5.	"Evidence"	Thelonious Monk	6:35
6.	"Some Other Time"	Jule Styne, Sammy Cahn	8:29
7.	"Loro"	Egberto Gismonti	9:37
8.	"A Wish"	Fred Hersch, Norma Winstone	4:35
Total length:			1:07:30

== Personnel ==
Band

- Fred Hersch – piano, producing
- Esperanza Spalding – voices, producing

Production

- Douglas Heusser – design
- Erika Kapin – photography
- Missi Callazzo – executive producer
- Geoff Countryman – assistant engineer
- James Farber – engineer
- Tyler McDiarmid – assistant engineer, mixing
- Nate Wood – mastering
