= Sixteen Sunsets =

Studio album by Jane Ira Bloom
- Released: December 15, 2013
- Recorded: May 20, June 12 & 17, 2013
- Studio: Avatar, New York City
- Genre: Jazz
- Length: 77:40
- Label: Outline Records
- Producer: Jane Ira Bloom, Jim Anderson

Jane Ira Bloom chronology
Wingwalker (2011)	Sixteen Sunsets (2013)	Early Americans (2016)

Professional ratings
Review scores
Source	Rating
All About Jazz	5/5 stars
The Buffalo News	4/4 stars
Tom Hull	B+

Sixteen Sunsets is a studio album by American jazz saxophonist Jane Ira Bloom. The album was released on December 15, 2013, by Outline Records label. This is her 15th album as a band leader. Sixteen Sunsets received a Grammy nomination for Best Surround Sound Album in 2014.

== Reception ==
The Buffalo News's Jeff Simon wrote, "Not only is this one of the best jazz discs of the year, it's, without doubt, one of the most beautiful records soprano saxophonist Jane Ira Bloom has ever made in a recording life that has been replete with the sublime... A magnificent disc—a balladic revelation for the final weeks of the year." Dan McClenaghan of All About Jazz stated, "Sixteen Sunsets is, arguably, Jane Ira Bloom's most compelling recording. It's certainly her loveliest—no argument there. And the sound quality is out of this world. An asteroid is nice, but it seems a rather small celestial body for an artist that can create something as perfect as this disc. Perhaps a star, a bright one, can be found." Lloyd Sachs of JazzTimes added, "Moving seamlessly between standards and originals, Sixteen Sunsets unfolds with a luminous intensity." NPR's Kevin Whitehead wrote, "She never sounds better than in ballads, and on Sixteen Sunsets she plays more than a dozen, including a few associated with Billie Holiday." Bill Kohlhaase writing for The Santa Fe New Mexican observed, "Sixteen Sunsets is a showcase for soprano saxophonist Jane Ira Bloom's rich tone and fluid expression. The disc's well-engineered sound and the smart program—six originals from Bloom and eight ballads—also showcase her thoughtful, deliberate way with melody. There's no rushing here. Bloom seems to dwell on each note, no matter the phrase it appears in, delivering each with a tonal fullness that resonates with warmth and color."

== Track listing ==
No.	Title	Writer(s)	Length
1.	"For All We Know"	J. Fred Coots, Sam M. Lewis	5:02
2.	"What She Wanted"	Bloom	7:48
3.	"Gershwin's Skyline / I Loves You Porgy"	Bloom	7:14
4.	"Darn That Dream"	Eddie DeLange, James Van Heusen	6:28
5.	"Good Morning Heartache"	Ervin Drake, Dan Fisher, Irene Higginbotham	5:17
6.	"Out of This World"	Harold Arlen, Johnny Mercer	6:23
7.	"Ice Dancing (For Torvill & Dean)"	Bloom	4:34
8.	"Left Alone"	Billie Holiday, Mal Waldron	7:34
9.	"The Way You Look Tonight"	Dorothy Fields, Jerome Kern	4:27
10.	"But Not For Me"	Bloom	5:42
11.	"Primary Colors"	Bloom	4:30
12.	"My Ship"	Ira Gershwin, Kurt Weill	2:43
13.	"Too Many Reasons"	Bloom	4:30
14.	"Bird Experiencing Light"	Bloom	5:28
Total length:			77:40

== Personnel ==
- Jane Ira Bloom – soprano saxophone
- Dominic Fallacaro – piano
- Cameron Brown – bass
- Matt Wilson – drums
