= Euclid's Nightmare =

Studio album by John Zorn & Bobby Previte
- Released: 1997
- Recorded: March 2, 1997
- Studio: Avatar Recording Studios, New York City
- Genre: Avant-garde
- Length: 41:03
- Label: Depth of Field
- Producer: Bobby Previte & John Zorn

John Zorn chronology
The Parachute Years (1997)	Euclid's Nightmare (1997)	Angelus Novus (1998)

Bobby Previte chronology
Too Close to the Pole (1996)	Euclid's Nightmare (1997)	My Man in Sydney (1997)

Euclid's Nightmare is an album of improvised music by Bobby Previte and John Zorn. The album was released on the Depth of Field label in 1997. The album comprises 27 untitled tracks of which several are intentionally identical - tracks (7) and (18); tracks (3) and (20); and tracks (5), (14), and (27).

== Reception ==
The Allmusic review by Thom Jurek awarded the album 3 stars stating "Here, Previte hears Zorn insistently and responds with short, crisp rim shots, rolling tom-toms, and scattershot cymbal runs that tend to stretch out the time, turn it loose from its constraints inside the work, and move forward into whatever frame Zorn chooses next. For his part, Zorn hears the thrumming of the cymbals and decides to speed up the piece in order to match Previte's double time. They both arrive in the pocket at the same time and kick the energy into an overdriven state of chaotic -- yet jubilant -- free improv, where there are no ties to gravity at all until Previte introduces a tom-tom and Zorn responds with a gorgeous angular legato. This is only one of dozens of surprises on Euclid's Nightmare. Zorn fans will be familiar with the level of histrionics employed here, while followers of Previte's more refined work may be put off by the constant atonality of the work.".

Professional ratings
Review scores
Source	Rating
Allmusic	3/5 stars

== Track listing ==
All compositions by Previte/Zorn.

1. - 1:07
2. - 1:05
3. - 1:09
4. - 1:06
5. - 2:02
6. - 1:06
7. - 1:03
8. - 2:00
9. - 1:01
10. - 1:41
11. - 1:05
12. - 0:59
13. - 1:07
14. - 2:02
15. - 2:06
16. - 2:04
17. - 1:01
18. - 1:03
19. - 3:43
20. - 1:13
21. - 2:06
22. - 2:38
23. - 1:13
24. - 1:07
25. - 1:02
26. - 1:19
27. - 4:01

== Personnel ==
- Bobby Previte – drums
- John Zorn – alto
