= Sunday Night at the Vanguard =

Studio album by Fred Hersch Trio
- Released: 2016
- Recorded: March 27, 2016
- Genre: Jazz
- Label: Palmetto

Fred Hersch Trio chronology
Solo (2015)	Sunday Night at the Vanguard (2016)	Open Book (2017)

Sunday Night at the Vanguard is an album by the Fred Hersch Trio. It earned the group a Grammy Award nomination for Best Jazz Instrumental Album.

== Personnel ==
Musicians

- Fred Hersch – piano
- John Hébert – bass
- Eric McPherson – drums
