= Slay the Suitors =

Studio album by Bobby Previte's Empty Suits
- Released: 1994
- Recorded: June 7–9, 1993
- Studio: Baby Monster Studio, New York City
- Genre: Avant-garde jazz
- Length: 54:15
- Label: Avant; 036
- Producer: Mark Helias and Bobby Previte

Bobby Previte chronology
Music of the Moscow Circus (1991)	Slay the Suitors (1994)	Hue and Cry (1994)

Slay the Suitors is an album by American drummer/composer Bobby Previte's group Empty Suits. The album was released on the Avant label in 1994.

== Reception ==
Professional ratings
Review scores
Source	Rating
Allmusic	4/5 stars

The Allmusic site awarded the album 4 stars stating "On the whole, Slay the Suitors is a shake-up, wake-up call to arms in which Bobby Previte faults classicism for not only stifling the artistic impulse, but also for running hand-in-hand with deeply entrenched, even violent forces of oppression. With this theme to guide him on Slay the Suitors, Previte is absolutely at his most uncompromising, and the resulting music -- like the CD cover -- is right on target".

== Track listing ==
All compositions by Bobby Previte.

1. "Fantasy and Nocturne" - 16:15
2. "Waltz" - 13:39
3. "Canon" - 9:41
4. "Prelude and Elegy" - 14:32

== Personnel ==
- Bobby Previte – drums
- Robin Eubanks - trombone, electronics
- Wayne Horvitz - Hammond organ, piano, synthesizer
- Steve Gaboury - piano, synthesizer, keyboard bass
- Jerome Harris - acoustic bass guitar, electric guitar
- Roger Squitero - percussion
- Production by Previte and Mark Helias, executive producer John Zorn
