= Weather Clear, Track Fast =

Studio album by Bobby Previte
- Released: 1991
- Recorded: January 7–8, 1991; New York City
- Genre: Avant-garde jazz
- Length: 41:03
- Label: Enja; 6082
- Producer: Bobby Previte

Bobby Previte chronology
Empty Suits (1990)	Weather Clear, Track Fast (1991)	Music of the Moscow Circus (1991)

Weather Clear, Track Fast is an album by Bobby Previte released on the Enja label in 1991.

== Reception ==
Professional ratings
Review scores
Source	Rating
Allmusic	4.5/5 stars
Entertainment Weekly	A

The Allmusic site awarded the album 4½ stars stating "This is easily one of the most important modern jazz outings of the decade. ...One of the reasons why this recording is so successful resides within Previte's memorably melodic compositions and near flawless arrangements. All of this is enhanced by the horn section's imaginative implications, whereby a simple chorus of extended notes might serve as a signal or time stamp amid the oscillating flows and overall sense of movement". Entertainment Weekly's Joseph Woodard said "Previte has shown a talent for creating evocative, almost picturesque music; on his new record, Weather Clear, Track Fast, he extends this approach while opening things up for freer improvisation".

== Track listing ==
All compositions by Bobby Previte.

1. "Quinella" - 9:05
2. "Weather Clear, Track Fast" - 5:34
3. "Traffic Along the Rail" - 11:43
4. "3/4 Pole" - 6:45
5. "Backstretch" - 7:23
6. "Photo Finish" - 7:18
7. "Weather Cloudy, Track Slow" - 7:12

== Personnel ==
- Bobby Previte – drums
- Graham Haynes – cornet
- Robin Eubanks – trombone
- Don Byron – clarinet, baritone saxophone
- Marty Ehrlich – clarinet, bass clarinet, alto saxophone, flute
- Anthony Davis (tracks 2–7), Steve Gaboury (track 1) – piano
- Anthony Cox – bass
