= Bobby Previte =

American drummer (born 1951)

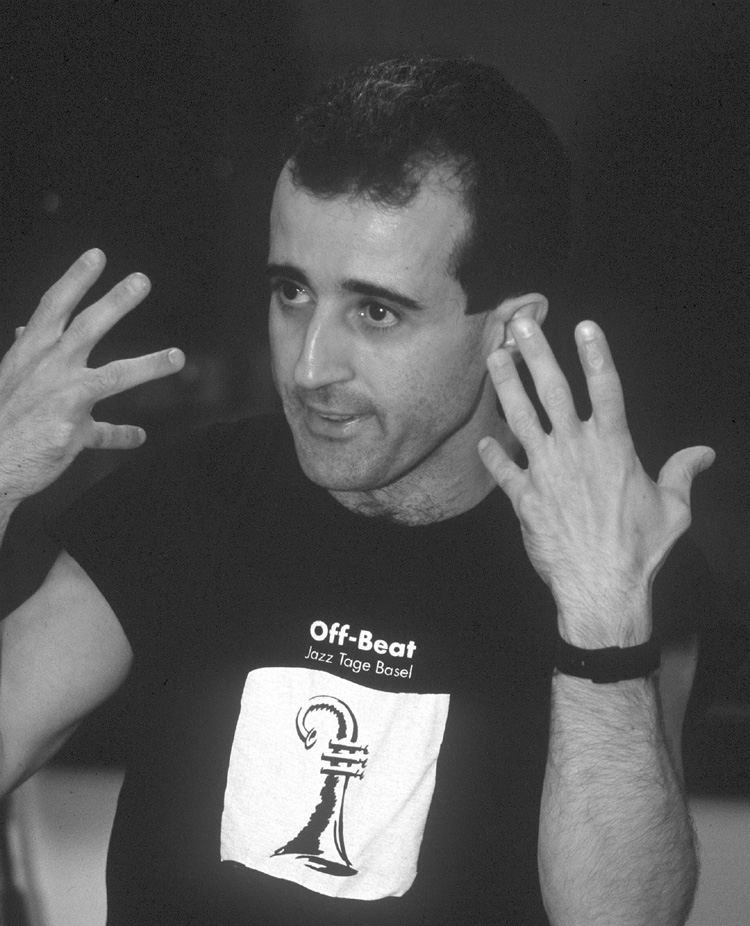
- Previte during a rehearsal in Moscow, 1991, photo by Mikhail Evstafiev

Background information
- Born: July 16, 1951 (age 75); Niagara Falls, New York, U.S.
- Genres: Jazz, rock, experimental
- Occupation: Musician
- Instrument: Drums
- Label: Palmetto
- Website: www.bobbyprevite.com

Bobby Previte (born July 16, 1951, in Niagara Falls, New York) is a drummer, composer, and bandleader. He earned a degree in economics from the University at Buffalo, where he also studied percussion. He moved to New York City in 1979 and began professional relationships with John Zorn, Wayne Horvitz, and Elliott Sharp.

== Composer ==
Previte has received critical acclaim for his "exceptional abilities as a composer and orchestrator." A review of his 1988 album Claude's Late Morning reports that "Perhaps most striking is Previte's skill in composing music that fully integrates these disparate instruments — including drums and drum machine, electric guitar and keyboards, trombone, harp, accordion, banjo, pedal steel guitar, tuba, and harmonica — while emphasizing each instrument's unique, individual sound." Another critic notes Previte's "driving and propulsive compositions, featuring both fiery jazz expressionism and layered counterpoint that suggested elements of contemporary minimalism.

In 1991, he wrote the score for "Cirk Valentin" (Moscow Circus on Stage), a stage show consisting of circus acts created by Valentin Gneushev that performed at the Gershwin Theatre on Broadway.

Recent large-scale compositional works as of Spring 2007 include:

- "The Constellations Ensemble," a chamber group touring the multi-media show, The 23 Constellations of Joan Miró.
- "The Separation", a collaboration with writer/director Andrea Kleine "dealing with the role of religion in society. Based on the 15th-century composer Guilliaume Dufay's Missa Sancti Jacobi and written for early music pioneers the Rose Ensemble with electric band."

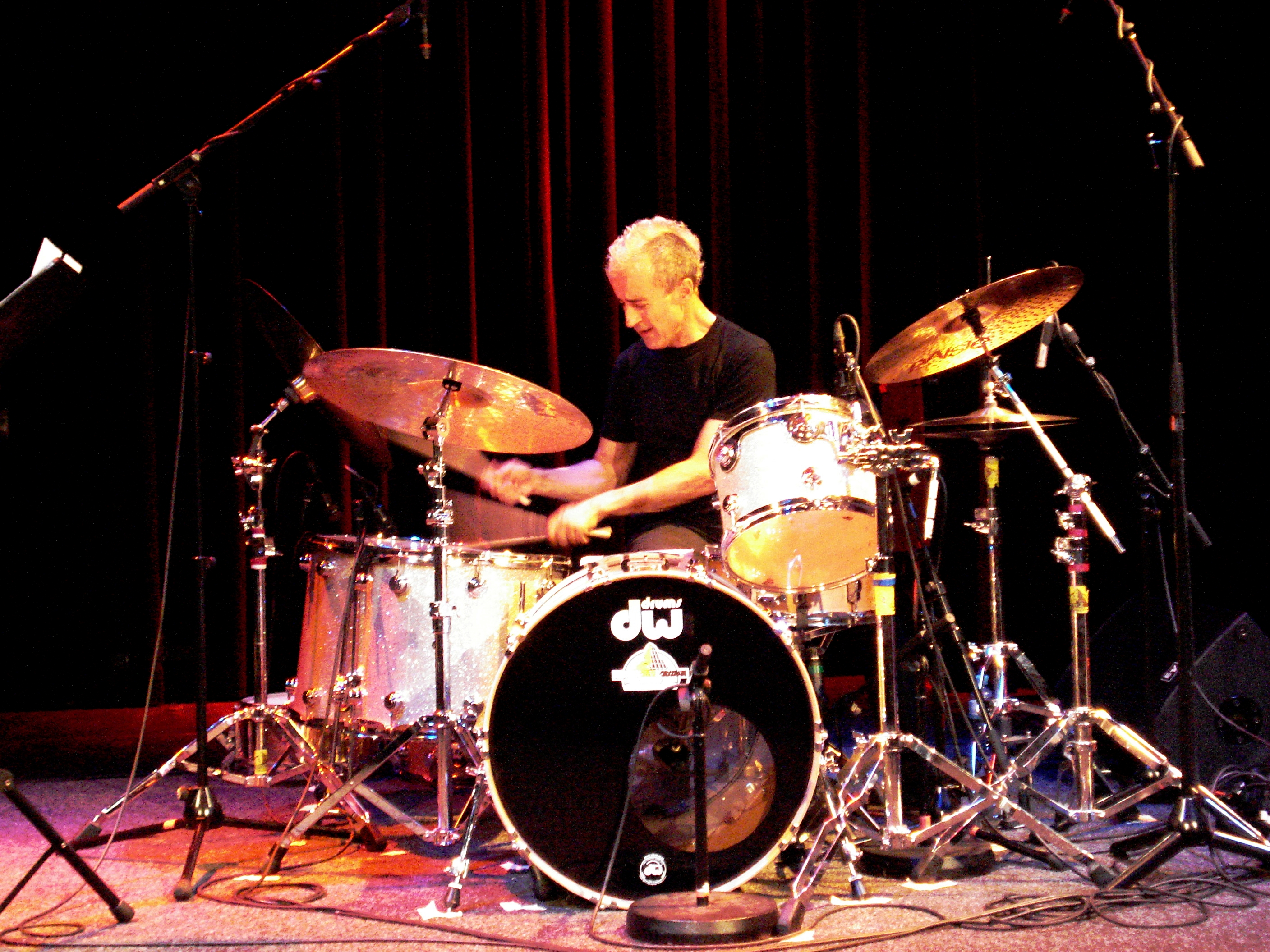
Bobby Previte live at Saalfelden 2009

== Performer ==
Previte has received excellent reviews and full articles in major newspapers such as The New York Times, The Washington Post, and The Guardian for playing a wide range of genres and venues and for qualities as diverse as his intellectual aesthetic to his ability "to groove." Recent and current projects as of Spring 2007 include :

- "Dialed In," a solo electronic drum show collaboration with video artist Benton C Bainbridge.
- The Coalition of the Willing, a guitar quartet featuring Charlie Hunter, Steven Bernstein and Jamie Saft.
- "Strike", a new quartet with organist Marco Benevento and two saxophones.
- "Groundtruther", a duo with Hunter.
- "The Beta Popes", a power trio with Skerik and Saft.
- "Swami LatePlate," a duo with Jamie Saft.

Much of Previte's work is also improvisational. One of Previte's own favorite recorded improvisational collaborations was with John Zorn, "Euclid's Nightmare" (Depth of Field 1997).

In the 1990s, he performed with the Seattle-based 100% improvisational musical collective Ponga with Wayne Horvitz, Skerik, and Dave Palmer. Previte has collaborated with Jamie Saft as "Swami Late Plate". Previte appeared in the movie Short Cuts, directed by Robert Altman.

In 1997, he founded the record company and label Depth of Field.

== Discography ==
=== As leader/co-leader ===
- 1980: Pull to Open (Zoar)
- 1985: Bump the Renaissance (Sound Aspects)
- 1987: Pushing the Envelope (Gramavision)
- 1987: Dull Bang, Gushing Sound, Human Shriek (Dossier)
- 1988: Claude's Late Morning (Gramavision)
- 1990: Empty Suits (Gramavision)
- 1991: Weather Clear, Track Fast (Enja)
- 1991: Music of the Moscow Circus (Gramavision)
- 1993: Slay the Suitors (Avant) with Empty Suits
- 1993: Hue and Cry (Enja) with Weather Clear, Track Fast
- 1996: Too Close to the Pole (Enja) with Weather Clear, Track Fast
- 1997: Euclid's Nightmare (Depth of Vision) with John Zorn
- 1997: My Man in Sydney (Enja) with Latin for Travelers
- 1998: In the Grass (Enja) with Marc Ducret
- 1998: Downtown Lullaby (Depth of Vision) with John Zorn, Wayne Horvitz and Elliott Sharp
- 1998: Dangerous Rip (Enja) with Latin for Travelers
- 2002: The 23 Constellations of Joan Miró (Tzadik)
- 2002: Just Add Water (Palmetto) with Bump
- 2002: The Prisoner's Dilemma (Church of Grob) with Elliott Sharp
- 2003: Counterclockwise (Palmetto) with Bump
- 2003: Come in Red Dog, This Is Tango Leader (Ropeadope) with Charlie Hunter
- 2004: Latitude (Thirsty Ear) as Groundtruther with Charlie Hunter and special guest Greg Osby
- 2005: Longitude (Thirsty Ear) as Groundtruther with Charlie Hunter and special guest DJ Logic
- 2006: The Coalition of the Willing (Ropeadope)
- 2007: Altitude (Thirsty Ear) as Groundtruther with Charlie Hunter and special guest John Medeski
- 2007: Doom Jazz (Veal) as Swami Lateplate with Jamie Saft
- 2008: Set the Alarm for Monday (Palmetto) with The New Bump
- 2008: White Hate (Veal) as Beta Popes with Jamie Saft and Skerik
- 2008: Live Hate (Veal) as Beta Popes with Jamie Saft and Skerik
- 2008: Big Guns (Auand) with Gianluca Petrella and Antonello Salis
- 2009: Pan Atlantic (Auand)
- 2012: Plutino (Spacebone)
- 2014: Terminals (Cantaloupe) with Sō Percussion, Zeena Parkins, Greg Osby, Nels Cline and John Medeski
- 2015: We Two Kings: Charlie Hunter and Bobby Previte Play the Great Carols (Rank Hypocrisy) with Charlie Hunter
- 2016: Mass (RareNoise) with The Rose Ensemble, Stephen O'Malley, Marco Benevento, Jamie Saft, and Reed Mathis
- 2022: Nine Tributes
- 2022: 12 Galaxies with Charlie Hunter
- 2022: Dark Current
- 2023: Doom Jazz II (Subsound) as Swami Lateplate with Jamie Saft
- 2023: Double Trouble with Ray Anderson
- 2024: Pathways for Drum Set
- 2025: Doppler with Mark Hellas
- 2025: Previte Chandler with Knox Chandler
- 2026: Visitor I: Parlor Organ
- 2026: Second Arrow

DVD

- 2006: Live in Japan 2003 (Word Public) with Jamie Saft and Skerik
- 2007: April in New York with Skerik, Zeena Parkins, Benton C Bainbridge, Elliott Sharp, and Marco Benvento
- 2007: The Separation (Rank Hypocrisy) with Andrea Kleine

=== As sideman ===
With Terry Adams

- Terrible (New World, 1995)

With Ray Anderson

- Where Home Is (Enja, 1999)
- Sweet Chicago Suite (Intuition, 2012)

With The Bang

- Omonimo (Nuevo, 1991)

With Bob Belden

- Black Dahlia (Blue Note, 2001)

With Marco Benevento

- Live at Tonic (Ropeadope, 2006)

With Tim Berne

- Pace Yourself (JMT, 1991)
- Nice View (JMT, 1994)

With Jane Ira Bloom

- The Nearness (Arabesque, 1996)
- The Red Quartets (Arabesque, 1999)
- Sometimes the Magic (Arabesque, 2001)
- Chasing Paint (Arabesque, 2003)
- Like Silver, Like Song (Arabesque, 2004)
- Wingwalker (Outline, 2011)
- Early Americans (Outline, 2016)
- Wild Lines: Improvising Emily Dickinson (Outline, 2017)

With William S. Burroughs

- Dead City Radio (Island, 1990)

With Corporate Art

- Corporate Art (JMT, 1991)

With Paul Dresher and Ned Rothenberg

- Opposites Attract (New World/CounterCurrents, 1991)

With Marty Ehrlich

- Pliant Plaint (Enja, 1988)
- The Traveller's Tale (Enja, 1990)
- Can You Hear a Motion? (Enja, 1994)
- Malinke's Dance (OmniTone, 1999)
- The Long View (Enja, 2002)

With Carol Emanuel

- Tops of Trees (Evva, 1995)

With David Fulton

- Marcos & Harry (Dossier, 1988)

With David Garland

- Togetherness: Control Songs, Vol. 2 (Ergodic, 1999)

With Jerome Harris

- Hidden in Plain View (New World)

With Robin Holcomb

- Larks, They Crazy (Sound Aspects, 1988)

With Lindsey Horner

- Don't Count On Glory (Cadence Jazz, 2005)

With Bill Horvitz

- Solo Electric Guitar Compositions for an 11-Solo Guitar & Ensemble Piece Ensemble (Ear-Rational, 1991)

With Wayne Horvitz

- Nine Below Zero (Sound Aspects, 1986)
- The President (Dossier, 1987)
- Todos Santos (Sound Aspects, 1988)
- Bring Yr Camera (Elektra/Musician, 1988)
- Miracle Mile (Elektra/Musician, 1992)
- Mylab (Terminus, 2004) with Tucker Martine

With Charlie Hunter

- Let the Bells Ring On (There, 2015)
- Everybody Has a Plan Until They Get Punched in the Mouth (GroundUP, 2016)

With Yoko Kanno

- Cowboy Bebop Vitaminless (Victor [Japan], 1998)
- Cowboy Bebop No Disc (Victor [Japan], 1998)
- Cowboy Bebop Blue (Victor [Japan], 1999)

With Guy Klucevsek

- Flying Vegetables of the Apocalypse (Experimental Intermedia Foundation, 1991)
- Polka Dots & Laser Beams (Eva, 1991)
- ?Who Stole the Polka? (Eva, 1991)

With Makigami Koichi

- Koroshi No Blues (Toshiba EMI, 1992)

With The New York Composers Orchestra

- The New York Composers Orchestra (New World, 1990)
- First Program in Standard Time (New World/CounterCurrents, 1992)

With Kirk Nurock

- Remembering Tree Friends (Koch, 1998)

With Seigen Ono

- NekonoTopia NekonoMania (Saidera, 1990)
- Bar Del Mattatoio (Saidera, 1994)
- Montreux 93/94 (Saidera, 1990)

With the Peggy Stern/Thomas Chapin Quintet

- The Fuchsia (Koch, 1997)

With Ponga

- Ponga (Loosegroove, 1999)
- The Ponga Remixes (Loosegroove, 1999)
- Psychological (P-Vine, 2000)

With Mike Pride

- Drummer's Corpse (AUM Fidelity, 2013)

With Bobby Radcliff

- Early in the Morning (A-Okay, 1985)

With Jamie Saft

- Black Shabbis (Tzadik, 2009)
- A Bag of Shells (Tzadik, 2010)
- The New Standard (RareNoise, 2014) with Steve Swallow
- Loneliness Road (RareNoise, 2017) with Steve Swallow and Iggy Pop

With Jeffrey Schanzer

- Vistas (Music Vistas, 1987)

With Elliott Sharp

- Virtual Stance (Dossier, 1985)
- Fractal (Dossier, 1986)
- Larynx (SST, 1987)
- Sili/Contemp/Tation (Ear-Rational, 1990)
- Arc 1: I/S/M 1980-1983 (Atavistic, 1996)
- Arc 2: The Seventies 1972-79 (Atavistic, 1997)

With The Sonny Clark Memorial Quartet

- Voodoo (Black Saint, 1986)

With Various Artists

- Lost in the Stars: The Music of Kurt Weill (A&M, 1985)
- Island of Sanity: New Music From New York City (No Man's Land, 1987)
- Weird Nightmare: Meditations on Mingus (Columbia, 1992)
- Music from and Inspired by the Film Short Cuts (Imago, 1992)

With Tom Varner

- Covert Action (New Note, 1989)

With Tom Waits

- Rain Dogs (Island, 1985)

With Victoria Williams

- Happy Come Home (Geffen, 1987)

With Andreas Willers

- Cityscapes (Sound Aspects, 1993)

With John Zorn

- The Big Gundown (Nonesuch/Icon, 1985)
- Cobra (Hat ART, 1987)
- Spillane (Elektra/Nonesuch, 1987)
- The Bribe (Tzadik, 1986 [1998])
- Filmworks VII: Cynical Hysterie Hour (CBS/Sony (Japan), 1989)
- Filmworks 1986–1990 (Eva, 1990)
- Filmworks III: 1990–1995 (Evva, 1995)
