= Wingwalker (album) =

Studio album by Jane Ira Bloom
- Released: January 7, 2011
- Recorded: June 5–6, 2010
- Studios: Avatar (New York, New York)
- Genre: Jazz
- Length: 57:41
- Label: Outline Records
- Producer: Jane Ira Bloom

Jane Ira Bloom chronology
Mental Weather (2008)	Wingwalker (2011)	Sixteen Sunsets (2013)

Professional ratings
Review scores
Source	Rating
All About Jazz	4/5 stars
AllMusic	4.5/5 stars
The Buffalo News	3.5/4 stars
Tom Hull	B+

Wingwalker is a studio album by jazz saxophonist Jane Ira Bloom. The album was released on January 7, 2011 by Outline Records label. This is her 14th album as a leader.

== Reception ==
Philip Booth in his review for JazzTimes wrote, "Her horn really is a thing of beauty, dancing through and around the theme and hanging in the air, as if it might be carrying the ghostly remainders of the tune, echoing down through the cavernous great hall of one of those grand hotels where the song once was regularly featured. On repeat listens, it grows even more haunting." Dan Bilawski of All About Jazz stated, "Wingwalker, with its positive energy and inspired ensemble connections, proves to be another feather in Bloom's cap and one of the best recordings to surface at the dawn of 2011." Ken dryden of AllMusic added, ""Wingwalker" is full of sudden twists in a free setting, a captivating work that sounds totally improvised, even if it isn't." Jeff Simon of The Buffalo News wrote, "It's the musical equivalent of walking in outer space -- a lonely triumph of humanity within great vastness. Not surprisingly, a beautiful disc in every way."

== Track listing ==
All tracks are written by Jane Ira Bloom except track 12 written by Alan Jay Lerner and Frederick Loewe.

No.	Title	Length
1.	"Her Exacting Light"	4:15
2.	"Life on Cloud 8"	5:39
3.	"Ending Red Songs"	5:39
4.	"Freud's Convertible"	6:33
5.	"Airspace"	3:26
6.	"Frontiers in Science"	6:36
7.	"Rooftops Speak Dreams"	5:22
8.	"Rookie"	4:49
9.	"Adjusting to Midnight"	3:52
10.	"Live Sports"	4:01
11.	"Wingwalker"	4:17
12.	"I Could Have Danced All Night"	3:06
13.	"Wingwalker Singularity"	5:49
Total length:		57:41

== Personnel ==
- Jane Ira Bloom – soprano saxophone
- Mark Helias – double bass
- Bobby Previte – drums
- Dawn Clement – piano, electric piano
