= The Nearness =

Studio album by Jane Ira Bloom
- Released: February 20, 1996
- Recorded: July 12–14, 1995
- Studio: Power Station Studio B, New York City
- Genre: Jazz
- Length: 68:07
- Label: Arabesque; AJ-0120
- Producer: Jane Ira Bloom

Jane Ira Bloom chronology
| Art and Aviation (1992) | The Nearness (1996) | The Red Quartets (1997) |

The Nearness is an album by saxophonist Jane Ira Bloom which was recorded in 1995 and released on the Arabesque label the following year.

== Reception ==
Professional ratings
Review scores
| Source | Rating |
|---|---|
| AllMusic | 3/5 stars |
| The Buffalo News | 4/4 stars |
| Tom Hull | B |
| The Penguin Guide to Jazz | 4/4 stars |

The AllMusic review by Chris Kelsey said "If forced to choose between this eminently thoughtful soprano saxophonist's writing and improvising, I'd have to say it's her original tunes that might keep me coming back. Not that there's anything wrong with her playing. Quite the contrary. She gets a full, gently-inflected, well-centered sound on her finicky horn -- the kind that only a full-time soprano player can produce with consistency. In the past I've found her improvising somewhat mannered; here, however, she's as spontaneous as one could ask. Her ballad playing is especially effective. But I think it's the sophistication of her contexts that fixes her among the modern mainstream's elite". Jeff Simon of The Buffalo News gave the record four stars out of four, calling it "a superb disc."

== Track listing ==
All compositions by Jane Ira Bloom except where noted

1. "Nearly Summertime" (George Gershwin, Ira Gershwin, DuBose Heyward) – 5:24
2. "Midnight Round/'Round Midnight" (Bloom / Thelonious Monk) – 5:39
3. "♭6 Bop" – 6:17
4. "Midnight's Measure/In the Wee Small Hours of the Morning" (Bloom / David Mann, Bob Hilliard) – 6:19
5. "Painting Over Paris" – 5:57
6. "Wing Dining" – 6:47
7. "Panosonic" – 6:35
8. "White Tower" – 4:09
9. "It's a Corrugated World" – 5:42
10. "Monk's Tale/The Nearness of You" (Bloom / Hoagy Carmichael, Ned Washington) – 3:32
11. "Lonely House" (Kurt Weill, Langston Hughes) – 6:49
12. "The All-Diesel Kitchen of Tomorrow" – 4:07
13. "Yonder" – 0:50

== Personnel ==
- Jane Ira Bloom – soprano saxophone
- Kenny Wheeler – flugelhorn, trumpet
- Julian Priester – trombone, bass trombone
- Fred Hersch – piano
- Rufus Reid – bass
- Bobby Previte – drums
