= Like Silver, Like Song =

Studio album by Jane Ira Bloom
- Released: April 15, 2005
- Recorded: July 8–9, 2004
- Studios: Avatar, New York City
- Genre: Jazz
- Length: 63:34
- Label: ArtistShare
- Producer: Jane Ira Bloom

Jane Ira Bloom chronology
Chasing Paint (2003)	Like Silver, Like Song (2005)	Mental Weather (2008)

Professional ratings
Review scores
Source	Rating
All About Jazz	4/5 stars
AllMusic	4.5/5 stars
The Buffalo News	3/4 stars
Penguin Guide to Jazz	3.5/4 stars
Tom Hull	B+

Like Silver, Like Song is a studio album by American jazz saxophonist Jane Ira Bloom, which was recorded in 2004 and released on April 15, 2005, by Artistshare label.

== Reception ==
Ken Dryden of AllMusic wrote, "Jane Ira Bloom has been one of the more adventurous soprano saxophonists who straddles the edge of straight-ahead jazz without ever losing sight of great melody. Like Silver, Like Song is a quartet session... that should appeal to mainstream fans who are usually suspicious of the presence of electronic effects." David Franklin of JazzTimes commented, "Bloom and her associates perform her thoughtful music with obvious empathy and consummate skill. The result is both captivating and refreshing." Writing for All About Jazz, Eyal Hareuveni added, "Bloom writes simple and accessible melodies, but Dresser, Previte, and Saft spark these melodies and load them with tons of kinetic energy, spontaneity, and a sense of experimentalism that bring her ideas into full articulation. Like Silver, Like Song is a captivating achievement." Jeff Simon of The Buffalo News noted, "It's a beautiful jazz quartet disc but one slightly out of balance. The snap, crackle, pop and bubble of electronic sound on it isn't nearly as forward-thinking and ear-opening as the free-form rhapsody and lyrical balladry is gorgeous and moving. The inescapable conclusion, then, is that this newest free-flowing quartet disc by Jane Ira Bloom presents great, formerly young jazz musicians only perfunctorily preserving musical freedom while truly relishing the deepest and most expressive parts of their natures."

== Track listing ==
All tracks are written by Jane Ira Bloom except for track 4 written by Jane Ira Bloom and Jamie Saft, and track 13 written by Oscar Hammerstein II and Richard Rodgers.

No.	Title	Length
1.	"Dreaming in the Present Tense"	2:47
2.	"Unconscious Forces"	6:44
3.	"Singing in Stripes"	3:59
4.	"Altair 4"	2:26
5.	"Vanishing Hat"	9:14
6.	"White Light"	3:59
7.	"No Orchestra"	5:35
8.	"Magnetic"	4:18
9.	"In an Instant"	2:44
10.	"Mercury"	7:00
11.	"Night Skywriting"	2:43
12.	"Dark Knowledge"	2:11
13.	"I Have Dreamed"	3:30
14.	"Singing in Stripes"	6:24
Total length:		63:34

== Personnel ==
- Jane Ira Bloom – saxophone (soprano), producing
- Mark Dresser – bass
- Bobby Previte – drums
- Jamie Saft – keyboards
