= Early Americans =

Studio album by Jane Ira Bloom
- Released: May 13, 2016
- Recorded: July 16–17, 2015
- Studio: Avatar, New York City
- Genre: Jazz
- Length: 52:18
- Label: Outline Records
- Producer: Jane Ira Bloom, Jim Anderson

Jane Ira Bloom chronology
Sixteen Sunsets (2013)	Early Americans (2016)	Wild Lines (2017)

Professional ratings
Review scores
Source	Rating
The Absolute Sound	3.5/5 stars
All About Jazz	4/5 stars
DownBeat	4/5 stars
Tom Hull	A−

Early Americans is a studio album by American jazz saxophonist Jane Ira Bloom. The album was released on May 13, 2016, by Outline Records label. This is her 16th album as a band leader. The album received the Grammy Award for Best Immersive Audio Album in 2018.

== Reception ==
Mark Sullivan of All About Jazz wrote, "The whole program is full of variety, beautiful and exploratory at the same time. The trio format works so well that it is surprising that Bloom hasn't used it before. I'd love to hear more from these three." Alain Drouot of DownBeat stated, "The saxophonist could not have produced such startling results if she had not first assembled such a vital trio. Helias’ strumming, arco work and plucking reveal a wealth of subtleties and an endless variety, and Previte provides irresistible propulsion, rich and vivid with color." JazzTimes 's Britt Robson commented, "Nearly 40 years and now 16 albums into her career, the soprano saxophonist has the pellucid tone and timbre that merit the sunlight and scrutiny of a spare ensemble." Duck Baker of The Absolute Sound noted, "Bloom for her part sounds relaxed and masterful on this, her first trio date, delivering one of the most convincing documents in a long and valuable career." Britt Robson of JazzTimes wrote, "Bloom again asserts her status as the preeminent soprano in jazz.

== Track listing ==
All tracks are written by Jane Ira Bloom except track 13 written by Leonard Bernstein and Stephen Sondheim.

No.	Title	Length
1.	"Song Patrol"	2:59
2.	"Dangerous Times"	4:21
3.	"Nearly (For Kenny Wheeler)"	1:52
4.	"Hips & Sticks"	5:34
5.	"Singing the Triangle"	5:23
6.	"Other Eyes"	3:06
7.	"Rhyme or Rhythm"	3:24
8.	"Mind Gray River"	5:29
9.	"Cornets of Paradise"	3:32
10.	"Say More"	3:54
11.	"Gateway to Progress"	5:48
12.	"Big Bill"	4:23
13.	"Somewhere"	2:33
Total length:		52:18

== Personnel ==
- Jane Ira Bloom – soprano saxophone
- Mark Helias – bass
- Bobby Previte – drums
