= Too Close to the Pole =

Studio album by Bobby Previte's Weather Clear, Track Fast
- Released: 1996
- Recorded: April 26–29, 1996
- Studio: Marweg EMI Studios, Cologne
- Genre: Avant-garde Jazz
- Length: 52:54
- Label: Enja; 9306
- Producer: Bobby Previte

Bobby Previte chronology
Hue and Cry (1993)	Too Close to the Pole (1996)	Euclid's Nightmare (1997)

Too Close to the Pole is an album by Bobby Previte's Weather Clear, Track Fast released on the Enja label in 1996.

== Reception ==
Professional ratings
Review scores
Source	Rating
Allmusic	4/5 stars

The Allmusic site awarded the album 4 stars stating "it is the chance-taking spirit of the musicians and their performances as a whole that make this a memorable release well worth several listens".

== Track listing ==
All compositions by Bobby Previte except where noted.

1. "Too Close to the Pole" - 4:14
2. "3 Minute Heels" - 13:00
3. "The Countess' Bedroom: from the Opera "The Queen Of Spades"" (Pyotr Ilyich Tchaikovsky) - 8:22
4. "Save the Cups" - 7:31
5. "The Eleventh Hour" - 14:16
6. "Too Close to the Pole" [Reprise] - 8:30
7. "Untitled" - 16:02

== Personnel ==
- Bobby Previte – drums, voice
- Lindsey Horner - electric bass, tin whistles, voice
- Andy Laster - baritone saxophone, clarinet, flute, voice
- Cuong Vu - trumpet, voice
- Jamie Saft - piano, Fender Rhodes piano, Hammond organ, clavinet, voice
- Curtis Hasselbring - trombone, voice
- Andrew D'Angelo - alto saxophone, bass clarinet, voice
