= Fred Hersch at Maybeck =

Live album by Fred Hersch
- Released: 1994
- Recorded: October 1993
- Venue: Maybeck Recital Hall, Berkeley, California
- Genre: Jazz
- Label: Concord

Fred Hersch at Maybeck: Maybeck Recital Hall Series Volume Thirty-One is an album of solo performances by jazz pianist Fred Hersch.

== Music and recording ==
The album was recorded at the Maybeck Recital Hall in Berkeley, California in October 1993. The material is "several well-worn pop standards, a few jazz tunes, and a couple of originals".

== Release and reception ==
Professional ratings
Review scores
Source	Rating
AllMusic	4/5 stars
The Penguin Guide to Jazz	3.5/4 stars
The Rolling Stone Jazz & Blues Album Guide	4.5/5 stars
The Virgin Encyclopedia of Jazz	4/5 stars

The Penguin Guide to Jazz concluded that the album "might not be his finest hour, but it sets up a near-perfect balance of his meditative and argumentative sides". The AllMusic reviewer described it as "another classy, technically unimpeachable, spotlessly recorded outing in the Maybeck series."

== Track listing ==
1. "Embraceable You"
2. "Haunted Heart"
3. "You Don't Know What Love Is"
4. "In Walked Bud"
5. "If I Loved You"
6. "Heartsong"
7. "Ev'rything I Love"
8. "Sarabande"
9. "The Song Is You"
10. "Ramblin'"
11. "Body and Soul"

== Personnel ==
- Fred Hersch – piano
