= Wild Lines: Improvising Emily Dickinson =

Studio album by Jane Ira Bloom
- Released: September 8, 2017
- Recorded: April 1, 2017
- Studio: Avatar, New York City
- Genre: Jazz
- Length: 1:57:17
- Label: Outline Records
- Producer: Jane Ira Bloom, Jim Anderson

Jane Ira Bloom chronology
Early Americans (2016)	Wild Lines: Improvising Emily Dickinson (2017)

Professional ratings
Review scores
Source	Rating
All About Jazz	4.5/5 stars
The Buffalo News	4/4 stars
Jazztrail	A–
Tom Hull	B+

Wild Lines: Improvising Emily Dickinson is a double studio album by American jazz saxophonist Jane Ira Bloom. The album was released on September 8, 2017 by Outline Reсords.

== Background ==
This double album contains 30 tracks that were inspired by the writings of nineteenth-century American poet Emily Dickinson. Wild Lines was made possible by a commission from Chamber Music America's 2015 New Jazz Works Program, funded through the Doris Duke Charitable Foundation. The release was premiered at Dickinson's home in Amherst, MA and then was performed at The Kennedy Center. This is her 17th album as a band leader.

== Reception ==
Britt Robson of JazzTimes wrote, "At the risk of courting gender stereotypes, there is a congruence between the way a ballerina moves and the music Jane Ira Bloom derives from her soprano saxophone on Wild Lines. To be able to blend refined grace and tensile strength into such an aesthetically pleasing flow requires both painstaking discipline and intuitive freedom. Bloom triumphs here on the straight horn because she is so doggedly enraptured, so coolly sublime." Roger Farbey writing for All About Jazz noted, "Whilst sharing identical titles and roughly the same structures, the tracks on each CD are subtly different. However, the captivating performances on both the instrumental recording and its spoken counterpart are equally enthralling." The Buffalo News 's Jeff Simon awarded the album four stars out of four, commenting, "One of the year's great jazz records by one of our greatest jazz poets and the brilliant friends who understand her completely."

== Track listing ==
All tracks are written by Jane Ira Bloom except track 15 written by Richard Rodgers and Lorenz Hart.

Disc 1
No.	Title	Length
1.	"Emily & Her Atoms"	6:43
2.	"Alone & In a Circumstance"	5:20
3.	"Other Eyes"	3:10
4.	"Singing the Triangle"	4:46
5.	"Dangerous Times"	3:53
6.	"Mind Gray River"	5:50
7.	"One Note From One Bird"	4:08
8.	"Cornets of Paradise"	3:20
9.	"A Star Not Far Enough"	2:17
10.	"You Wish You Had Eyes in Your Pages"	3:05
11.	"Wild Lines"	1:31
12.	"Say More"	3:01
13.	"Bright Wednesday"	1:23
14.	"Big Bill"	4:53
15.	"It's Easy to Remember"	2:18
Total length:		55:46

All tracks are written by Jane Ira Bloom except track 15 written by Richard Rodgers and Lorenz Hart.

Disc 2
No.	Title	Length
1.	"Wild Lines"	2:18
2.	"Emily & Her Atoms"	7:32
3.	"Alone & In a Circumstance"	5:58
4.	"One Note From One Bird"	4:25
5.	"Dangerous Times"	4:11
6.	"A Star Not Far Enough"	3:33
7.	"Singing the Triangle"	5:36
8.	"Mind Gray River"	6:13
9.	"Cornets of Paradise"	3:16
10.	"Other Eyes"	3:35
11.	"Say More"	2:56
12.	"You Wish You Had Eyes in Your Pages"	3:02
13.	"Bright Wednesday"	1:44
14.	"Big Bill"	5:04
15.	"It's Easy to Remember"	2:16
Total length:		61:48

== Personnel ==
- Jane Ira Bloom – soprano saxophone
- Dawn Clement – piano
- Mark Helias – bass
- Bobby Previte – drums
- Deborah Rush – voice
