= Live in Europe (Fred Hersch album) =

Live album by Fred Hersch Trio
- Released: May 2018
- Recorded: November 24, 2017
- Venues: Flagey_Building, Brussels, Belgium
- Genre: Jazz
- Length: 63:51

Live in Europe is an album by the Fred Hersch Trio, released in May 2018.

== Track listing ==
1. We See - 5:51
2. Snape Maltings - 7:12
3. Scuttlers - 2:50
4. Skipping - 4:48
5. Bristol Fog (For John Taylor) - 8:25
6. Newklypso (For Sonny Rollins) - 8:40
7. The Big Easy (For Tom Piazza) - 6:56
8. Miyako - 7:10
9. Black Nile - 6:43
10. Solo Encore-Bluemonk - 5:16

== Personnel ==
Musicians

- Fred Hersch – piano
- John Hébert – bass
- Eric McPherson – drums
