= Modern Drama (album) =

Studio album by Jane Ira Bloom
- Released: 1987
- Recorded: February 9–13, 1987
- Studio: RCA Studio A (New York City)
- Genre: Jazz
- Length: 44:25
- Label: Columbia Records
- Producer: Jane Ira Bloom

Jane Ira Bloom chronology
As One (1984)	Modern Drama (1987)	Slalom (1988)

Modern Drama is a studio album by American jazz saxophonist Jane Ira Bloom. The album was released in 1987 by Columbia label. This is her fourth full-size release and the first one by the major label. Koch Jazz re-released the album in 1996. The album contains nine compositions written by Bloom.

== Reception ==
Professional ratings
Review scores
Source	Rating
AllMusic	4/5 stars

Bill Shoemaker of JazzTimes stated "Modern Drama, originally issued on Columbia in ’87, was a pivotal recording for Jane Ira Bloom, as it debuted her use of live electronics to augment her sumptuous soprano saxophone sound... Her writing is strong, particularly on ballads like the poignant “More Than Sinatra,” and her playing is assured." AllMusic's Scott Yanow wrote, " In addition to her soprano and a bit of alto, Bloom makes creative use of live electronics. Key among her sidemen on these nine originals is keyboardist Fred Hersch. The music is explorative yet generally melodic and worth searching for." A reviewer of Audio noted, "This was obviously the right album for soprano saxophonist Jane Ira Bloom to make."

== Track listing ==
All tracks are written by Jane Ira Bloom.

No.	Title	Length
1.	"Overstars"	5:42
2.	"Cagney"	5:50
3.	"More Than Sinatra"	4:40
4.	"NFL"	4:31
5.	"Modern Drama"	5:09
6.	"Strange and Completely"	4:23
7.	"Varo"	5:24
8.	"The Race (For Shirley Muldowney)"	5:00
9.	"Rapture of the Flat"	3:41
Total length:		44:25

== Personnel ==
- Jane Ira Bloom – soprano saxophone & live electronics, alto saxophone
- Fred Hersch – piano, Hammond B3 organ
- Ratzo Harris – bass, electric bass
- Tom Rainey – drums
- David Friedman – vibes, marimba, percussion
- Isidro Bobadilla – percussion
- Andy Seligson – tuba (track 4)
