= Masada: Tet =

Studio album by John Zorn
- Released: 1998
- Recorded: April 21, 1997
- Genre: Jazz
- Length: 62:06
- Label: DIW
- Producer: John Zorn and Kazunori Sugiyama

Masada chronology
Masada: Het (1997)	Masada: Tet (1998)	Masada: Yod (1998)

John Zorn chronology
Angelus Novus (1998)	Masada: Tet (1998)	Filmworks VIII: 1997 (1998)

Masada: Tet, also known as ט or Masada 9, is a 1998 album by American composer and saxophonist John Zorn released on the Japanese DIW label. It is the ninth album of Masada recordings.

== Reception ==
The Allmusic review by Don Snowden awarded the album 3 stars stating "All the trademark touches – the Ornette Coleman and Middle Eastern tinges, the high-intensity sonic blitzes, the skyrocketing John Zorn/Dave Douglas exchanges – are there and sounding just fine. But deep down, this volume in the Masada saga revolves around a pretty exceptional surprise and it's all the better for it. This is probably the most democratic Masada disc, the best one for hearing the quartet with bassist Greg Cohen and drummer Joey Baron on equal terms with the front line... It's not like Zorn and Douglas are way off their game – they're in top form here and normally you expect that on a typical Masada disc. But they're the obvious front-line marquee guys and what distinguishes Nine/Tet is the ability to clearly hear and focus on what Cohen and Baron bring to the sound. It makes the music more varied, more capable of springing surprises, and an enormously valuable volume in the Masada catalog".

Professional ratings
Review scores
Source	Rating
Allmusic	3/5 stars

== Track listing ==
All compositions by John Zorn.

1. "Chayah" – 9:33
2. "Karet" – 1:56
3. "Moshav" – 6:50
4. "Leshem" – 4:36
5. "Kochot" – 5:15
6. "Meholalot" – 8:50
7. "Kedushah" – 6:18
8. "Ner Tamid" – 4:07
9. "Acharei Mot" – 9:04
10. "Jachin" – 5:37

- Recorded at Avatar, New York City on April 21, 1997

== Personnel ==
- John Zorn – alto saxophone
- Dave Douglas – trumpet
- Greg Cohen – bass
- Joey Baron – drums
