= Hue and Cry (album) =

Studio album by Bobby Previte's Weather Clear, Track Fast
- Released: 1994
- Recorded: December 1993
- Studio: RPM Studios, New York City
- Genre: Avant-garde Jazz
- Length: 57:42
- Label: Enja; 8064
- Producer: Bobby Previte

Bobby Previte chronology
Slay the Suitors (1993)	Hue and Cry (1994)	Too Close to the Pole (1996)

Hue and Cry is an album by Bobby Previte's Weather Clear, Track Fast released on the Enja label in 1994.

== Reception ==
Professional ratings
Review scores
Source	Rating
Allmusic	4/5 stars

The Allmusic site awarded the album 4 stars stating "Hue and Cry features an eight-strong, all-star version of Bobby Previte's Weather Clear, Track Fast band and results in one of his finest efforts as a leader".

== Track listing ==
All compositions by Bobby Previte.

1. "Hubbub" – 4:06
2. "Smack–dab" – 5:59
3. "Move Heaven and Earth" – 6:04
4. "700 Camels" – 14:11
5. "Valerie" – 7:04
6. "Hue and Cry" – 13:03
7. "For John Laughlan, and All That We Stood For" – 7:15

== Personnel ==
- Bobby Previte – drums
- Eddie Allen – trumpet
- Robin Eubanks – trombone
- Don Byron – clarinet, baritone saxophone
- Marty Ehrlich – clarinet, soprano saxophone, alto saxophone, flute
- Larry Goldings – Hammond organ
- Anthony Davis – piano
- Anthony Cox – bass
