= The Red Quartets =

Studio album by Jane Ira Bloom
- Released: 1999
- Recorded: May 29, 1997 and January 2–3, 1999
- Studio: Acoustic Recording, Brooklyn, NY
- Genre: Jazz
- Length: 62:08
- Label: Arabesque; AJ-0144
- Producer: Jane Ira Bloom

Jane Ira Bloom chronology
The Nearness (1995)	The Red Quartets (1999)	Sometimes the Magic (2001)

The Red Quartets is an album by saxophonist Jane Ira Bloom which was recorded in 1997 and 1999 and released on the Arabesque label.

== Reception ==
Professional ratings
Review scores
Source	Rating
AllMusic	4/5 stars
All About Jazz	5/5 stars
Tom Hull	B+
Penguin Guide to Jazz	4/4 stars

The AllMusic review by Michael G. Nastos said " Jane Ira Bloom hits a career high point with this remarkably consistent CD, The Red Quartets. The tracks operate in a flip-flop mode -- every other cut is either lush and introspective or quirky and searching. It gives a good indication that at least two of Bloom's sides are well represented, be they tender or intellectual. Touching on elements avant and mainstream, she lovingly molds music that is truly all her own ... Strong musical content, firmly rooted in thoroughly modern, contemporary, creative jazz values, sitting on a foundation thick as granite, Bloom's music should prove to be universally appealing. These Red Quartets, as spirited a music as you will find, will likely keep jazz lovers' karmic accounts on the plus side for many years to come".

On All About Jazz, Glenn Astarita stated "Jane Ira Bloom is known for her willingness to take chances, or at times taking the lesser known path while skirting the fringes of modern mainstream jazz. On The Red Quartets Ms. Bloom performs with all the graceful majesty which has become her trademark while working with an ensemble which represents the creme’ de la creme’ of modern jazz and innovation ... The Red Quartets is all about class and finesse which represents a listening experience of the highest order....Strongly Recommended", while Mike Neely observed "What a pleasure it is to hear a jazz quartet play with such joy and precision. Jane Ira Bloom has recorded a CD entitled The Red Quartets that is guaranteed to sharpen your listening. There is a snap and verve to this group, an ease of exchange in their multi-layered interaction that is incessantly creative".

In JazzTimes, Bill Bennett wrote "The quartet opens up nine Bloom compositions and a pair of standards, finding textures ranging from velvet to flint. Hersch and Bloom communicate telepathically, and Dresser and Previte have honed their sense of play in music to a very fine point. Chalk up another winner for Jane Ira Bloom".

== Track listing ==
All compositions by Jane Ira Bloom except where noted

1. "Always Hope" – 4:43
2. "Time After Time" (Jule Styne, Sammy Cahn) – 4:41
3. "Monk's Rec Room" – 5:28
4. "Tell Me Your Diamonds" – 7:37
5. "Jax Calypso" – 5:01
6. "Chagall/How Deep Is the Ocean?" (Bloom/Irving Berlin) – 9:03
7. "Five Full Fathoms" – 3:48
8. "It's a Corrugated World" – 7:09
9. "Climb Inside Her Eyes" – 5:34
10. "Emergency" – 7:45
11. "Einstein's Red/Blue Universe" – 1:15

== Personnel ==
- Jane Ira Bloom – soprano saxophone
- Fred Hersch – piano
- Mark Dresser – bass
- Bobby Previte – drums
