= Slalom (album) =

Studio album by Jane Ira Bloom
- Released: 1988
- Recorded: June 6–9, 1988
- Studio: RCA Studio A (New York City)
- Genre: Jazz
- Length: 46:36
- Label: Columbia Records
- Producer: Jane Ira Bloom

Jane Ira Bloom chronology
Modern Drama (1987)	Slalom (1988)	Art and Aviation (1992)

Professional ratings
Review scores
Source	Rating
AllMusic	4/5 stars

Slalom is a studio album by American jazz saxophonist Jane Ira Bloom. The album was released in 1988 by Columbia label. Koch Jazz re-released the album in 1996. In the liner notes Bloom mentioned, "On this Compact Disc I tried to create a setting where the line between composed material and improvisation would disappear, so that simply the playing would come through. At the sessions, part of the challenge for a player was finding a creative edge on a number of pieces that weave in and out of the jazz tradition. Part of the challenge for our group was making it all flow."

== Reception ==
Scott Yanow of AllMusic stated, "Jane Ira Bloom is teamed with pianist Fred Hersch in a quartet that explores a variety of melodic material in unexpected ways. Bloom, one of the top soprano saxophonists around and a creative user of electronics, has a fairly original tone and her improvisations are consistently full of surprises." A reviewer of The Crisis wrote, "Simplicity is her strong suit. The sound which she calls "jazz without a safety net" is so pleasant and comfortable that even non-jazz lovers are warming to it."

== Track listing ==
All tracks are written by Jane Ira Bloom except track 2 written by George Gershwin and Ira Gershwin and track 7 written by Ralph Rainger and Leo Robin.

No.	Title	Length
1.	"Mighty Lights"	4:51
2.	"Gershwin's Skyline / I Loves You Porgy"	5:28
3.	"Blues on Mars"	4:02
4.	"Slalom"	4:25
5.	"Ice Dancing (For Torvill and Dean)"	3:34
6.	"Drums Like Dancing"	4:41
7.	"If I Should Lose You"	3:45
8.	"Light Years Away"	4:19
9.	"Painting Over Paris"	4:58
10.	"Miro"	4:31
11.	"Mighty Lights II"	1:58
Total length:		46:36

== Personnel ==
- Jane Ira Bloom – soprano saxophone
- Kent McLagan – double bass, electric bass
- Tom Rainey – drums, percussion
- Fred Hersch – piano
