= Mohamed Badawi =

Sudanese linguist, writer and musician (born 1965)

- محمد بدوي
- Born: 1965 (age 60–61); Omdurman, Sudan
- Citizenship: Sudanese, German
- Education: University of Konstanz, Germany
- Occupations: Linguist, writer, musician
- Known for: Publications about Arabic language and culture
- Website: Official website

Mohamed Badawi (Arabic: محمد بدوي; born 1965 in Omdurman, Sudan) is a Sudanese linguist and publisher, writer, musician and composer, as well as founder of the "Sudan Education Project". In 2019, he was elected as member of the city council of Konstanz, Germany, where he has lived since 1997.

== Life ==
Badawi's family originates from members of the Sufi order of the Qadiriyyah. Badawi has lived in Europe since 1984. From 1984 to 1993 he studied French, Arabic Studies, theoretical linguistics and German at the universities of Lyon and Konstanz. After graduation, he received a PhD degree from the linguistics department of the University of Konstanz in 1997. Badawi works as Arabic lecturer at the Language Teaching Institute of this university. He is also a certified translator between Arabic and German.

Since 1997, he has been living with his family in Konstanz. In municipal elections of 2019, he won the highest number of votes for the Free Green List, an environmental group, and became member of the Konstanz city council until the end of his term in 2024.

== Music ==
Mohamed Badawi is the founder, composer and singer of the bands "Badawi Band", "Diwan" and "El Nour Ensemble". Besides singing, he is also an oud player. In his musical projects, he has worked with artists and musicians from several different countries.

== "Sudan Education Project" ==
Mohamed Badawi is the founder of the "Sudan Education Project". Within the framework of this project, he designed a concept for the foundation of a European university in the greater area of Khartoum, the "Nihal European University". Another part of the project consisted in aiding street children by giving them music education. Following the beginning of the war in Sudan in 2023, this project had to be abandoned.

== Publishing and journalism ==
Badawi is the author of textbooks on learning Arabic language and editor of the "As-Sabil Sammelbände für den Kulturpluralismus" series (As-Sabil anthologies for cultural pluralism), which compiles texts on culture and religion in the Arab World. He is also the owner of the "Badawi artes afro arabica" publishing company. In his publishing house Dar Badawi he has published books in Arabic on literature, philosophy and religion by Arabic authors. These include the one-act play Mind Schrödinger by Sudanese writer Abdelaziz Baraka Sakin. It was inspired by the life of physicist Erwin Schrödinger and published in the Arabic original as well as in English and German translations. Further, an edition of the Arabic translation of Goethe’s West-Eastern Divan is part of the program.

In November 2023, Badawi published an opinion piece about the Gaza war, calling for a ceasefire, international intervention that leads to negotiations, a permanent and just peace settlement and finally to a free, sovereign and independent Palestine.

== Selected publications ==
- Mohamed Badawi / Christian A. Caroli: As-Sabil. Praktisches Lehrbuch zum Erlernen der Arabischen Sprache der Gegenwart, Band 1, Konstanz 2005. ISBN 978-3-938828-01-4 (As-Sabil. Practical textbook for learning the Arabic language of today, volume 1)
- Mohamed Badawi / Christian A. Caroli: As-Sabil – Sammelbände für Kulturpluralismus, Band 1 (Europa und der Islam), Konstanz 2007. ISBN 978-3-938828-04-5 (As-Sabil – Anthologies for cultural pluralism, volume 1 (Europe and Islam))
- Mohamed Badawi / Christian A. Caroli: As-Sabil: Grundlagen der arabischen Schrift, Konstanz 2008. ISBN 978-3-938828-17-5 (As-Sabil: Basics of the Arab writing system)
- Mohamed Badawi / Christian A. Caroli: As-Sabil: Grundlagen der arabischen Verblehre, Konstanz 2008. ISBN 978-3-938828-14-4 (As-Sabil: Basics of Arabic verbs)
- Mohamed Badawi / Christian A. Caroli: As-Sabil – Sammelbände für Kulturpluralismus, Band 2 (Das Aufeinandertreffen von Kulturen), Konstanz 2009. ISBN 978-3-938828-26-7 (As-Sabil – Anthologies for cultural pluralism, volume 2 (The clash of cultures))
