= As One (Jane Ira Bloom and Fred Hersch album) =

Studio album by Jane Ira Bloom and Fred Hersch
- Released: 1985
- Recorded: September 1984
- Studio: Classic Sound, New York City
- Genre: Jazz
- Length: 40:22
- Label: JMT; JMT 850 003
- Producer: Jane Ira Bloom & Fred Hersch

Jane Ira Bloom chronology
Mighty Lights (1982)	As One (1985)	Modern Drama (1987)

Fred Hersch chronology
Horizons (1984)	As One (1985)	Sarabande (1987)

As One is an album of duets album by saxophonist Jane Ira Bloom and pianist Fred Hersch recorded in 1984 and released on the JMT label.

== Reception ==
The AllMusic review by Scott Yanow states, "The improvisations are generally melodic but unpredictable, coherent but fairly free. Worth several listens".

Professional ratings
Review scores
Source	Rating
AllMusic	3/5 stars
The Penguin Guide to Jazz	3/4 stars

== Track listing ==
All compositions by Jane Ira Bloom except as indicated

1. "Waiting for Daylight" - 9:04
2. "Desert" - 4:14
3. "A Child's Song (For Charlie Haden)" (Fred Hersch) - 6:08
4. "Miyako" (Wayne Shorter) - 6:41
5. "Inside" (Bloom, Hersch) - 3:51
6. "Winter of My Discontent" (Alec Wilder) - 4:53
7. "Janeology" (Hersch) - 5:26

== Personnel ==
- Jane Ira Bloom - soprano saxophone
- Fred Hersch - piano
