= Jane Ira Bloom =

American jazz saxophonist and composer

- Born: January 12, 1955 (age 71); Boston, Massachusetts, U.S.
- Genres: Jazz, avant-garde jazz
- Occupations: Musician, composer
- Instrument: Soprano saxophone
- Labels: Columbia, Outline, Arabesque, Enja
- Website: www.janeirabloom.com

Jane Ira Bloom (born January 12, 1955) is an American jazz soprano saxophonist and composer.

== Early years ==
Bloom was born in Boston, Massachusetts, to Joel and Evelyn Bloom. She began as a pianist and drummer, later switching to the alto saxophone, and eventually settling on the soprano saxophone as her primary instrument. She first began playing the saxophone at age 9, studying with woodwind virtuoso Joseph Viola, chair of the Berklee College of Music Woodwinds Department, from 1968 to 1979, and studying music at Yale University from which she received a liberal arts degree and a master's degree in music (1977). Following Yale, Bloom relocated to New York City. She founded Outline Records while in New Haven and released several recordings under that label.

== Career ==
She was the first musician to be commissioned by the NASA Art Program. in 1989 she created three original musical compositions: Most Distant Galaxy, for soprano saxophone and live electronics, prepared tape, bass, drums, and electroacoustic percussion; Fire & Imagination, for soprano saxophone, improvisors, and chamber orchestra; and Beyond the Sky, for wind ensemble.

In 2007, she was awarded a Guggenheim Fellowship in music composition.

Bloom is a tenured professor at The New School for Jazz and Contemporary Music in New York City's Greenwich Village.

Her 2013 release, Sixteen Sunsets, received a Grammy nomination for the 56th Grammy Awards in the Best Surround Sound category, with sound engineer Jim Anderson.

Bloom won the Chamber Music America New Jazz Works award in 2015 for a new composition inspired by the 19th-century American poet Emily Dickinson.

The resulting work, entitled "Wild Lines" premiered in 2016 to positive reviews.

Bloom won the 2017 Grammy Award for Best Surround Sound category at the 60th Annual Grammy Awards for her album “Early Americans.”

== Legacy ==
The asteroid 6083 Janeirabloom was named after her.

== Discography ==
=== As leader ===
- Second Wind (Outline, 1980)
- Mighty Lights (Enja, 1982)
- As One (JMT, 1985)
- Modern Drama (Columbia, 1987)
- Slalom (Columbia, 1988)
- Art and Aviation (Arabesque, 1992)
- The Nearness (Arabesque, 1996)
- The Red Quartets (Arabesque, 1999)
- Sometimes the Magic (Arabesque, 2001)
- Chasing Paint (Arabesque, 2003)
- Like Silver, Like Song (ArtistShare, 2005)
- Mental Weather (Outline, 2008)
- Wingwalker (Outline, 2010)
- Sixteen Sunsets (Outline, 2013)
- Early Americans (Outline, 2016)
- Wild Lines: Improvising Emily Dickenson (Outline, 2017)
- Some Kind of Tomorrow (Outline, 2021)
- Tues Days (Outline, 2021)
- Picturing the Invisible: Focus 1 (Outline, 2022)

=== As guest ===
- Sandra Boynton, Philadelphia Chickens (Rounder, 2004)
- Jay Clayton, All-Out (Anima, 1981)
- Anthony Davis, Return from Space (Gramavision, 1985)
- Giora Feidman, Klezmer Celebration (Plane 1997)
- David Friedman, Of the Wind's Eye (Enja, 1981)
- Jerry Granelli, Another Place (veraBra, 1993)
- Frederic Hand, Frederick Hand's Baroque and On the Street (CBS, 1981)
- Frederic Hand, Frederic Hand's Jazzantiqua (Musical Heritage Society, 1984)
- Frederic Hand, Jazzantiqua (Musical Heritage Society, 1985)
- Ron Horton, Genius Envy (Omnitone, 1999)
- Daniel Humair, Surrounded 1964/87 (Blue Flame, 1987)
- Cleo Laine, Jazz (RCA Victor, 1991)
- Bobby Previte, The 23 Constellations of Joan Miro (Tzadik, 2001)
- M'lumbo, Celestial Ghetto (Pursuance, 2011)
- M'lumbo, Tuning In To Tomorrow (Pursuance, 2012)
- M'lumbo, Popular Science (Pursuance, 2013)
- M'lumbo, Celestial Mechanics (Ropeadope, 2020)
