= Filmworks XI: Secret Lives =

Soundtrack album by John Zorn
- Released: 2002
- Recorded: 2002
- Genre: Avant-garde, jazz, classical
- Length: 54:18
- Label: Tzadik TZ 7339
- Producer: John Zorn

Filmworks chronology
Filmworks X: In the Mirror of Maya Deren (2001)	Filmworks XI: Secret Lives (2002)	Filmworks XII: Three Documentaries (2002)

John Zorn chronology
Hemophiliac (2002)	Filmworks XI: Secret Lives (2002)	Filmworks XII: Three Documentaries (2002)

Filmworks XI: Secret Lives features a score for film by John Zorn performed by the Masada String Trio with guest appearances from Vanessa Saft on vocals and Jamie Saft on piano. The album was released on Zorn's own label, Tzadik Records, in 2002 and contains music that Zorn wrote and recorded for Secret Lives: Hidden Children and Their Rescuers During WWII, a documentary on Jewish children hidden during the Second World War directed by Aviva Slesin. The documentary was originally to be titled Under the Wing and several sources still refer to the soundtrack under this name.

== Reception ==
Professional ratings
Review scores
Source	Rating
Allmusic	4/5 stars

The Allmusic review by Thom Jurek awarded the album 4 stars noting that "Simply put, this volume of John Zorn's ongoing series of recordings documenting his soundtrack work is stunning. Lyrical, haunting, and exquisitely composed... That a score can reflect a film's intentions so directly and remain its own entity is a testament to the strength of its composer, that a score can, outside the context of the film it was composed for, reflect a kind of nearly mythical beauty is an achievement that is virtually indescribable in its triumph".

== Track listing ==
All compositions by John Zorn

1. "Yesoma" (vocal) - 3:07
2. "Shabbes Noir" (pizz, arco) - 3:37
3. "Tension" - 0:56
4. "Hatzalah" - 4:44
5. "Brachas" (edit) - 3:16
6. "Chazal" - 1:03
7. "Ba'adinot" (pizz) - 1:22
8. "Drama" - 3:02
9. "Yesoma" (vibe) - 3:26
10. "Darkly" - 1:40
11. "Kavana" - 4:01
12. "The Trap" - 2:14
13. "Ba'adinot" (arco) - 1:05
14. "Armistice Swing" - 4:18
15. "Shabbes Noir" - 3:00
16. "Motzee" - 2:30
17. "Interlude" - 2:06
18. "Yesoma" (pizz) - 1:33
19. "Ba'adinot" (solo) - 2:28
20. "Shabbes Noir" (fast) - 2:11
21. "Yesoma" (cello) - 2:35
- Recorded at Frank Booth, Brooklyn (New York) in 2002

== Personnel ==
- Erik Friedlander - cello
- Mark Feldman - violin
- Greg Cohen - bass
- Vanesa Saft - vocals (tracks 1 & 10)
- Jamie Saft - piano (track 14)
