= And Thou Shalt Love =

- Directed by: Chaim Elbaum
- Written by: Chaim Elbaum
- Produced by: Pazit Lichtman
- Starring: Uri Lachmi; Omer Zonenshein
- Music by: Ophir Leibovitch
- Release date: 2007
- Running time: 29 minutes
- Country: Israel
- Language: Hebrew

And Thou Shalt Love (Hebrew: ואהבת, translit. V'ahavta) is an Israeli short film. It was directed by Chaim Elbaum as part of his studies at the Ma'aleh religious film school. The film tells the story of a Hesder yeshiva student dealing with being gay, based on Elbaum's own experiences.

The hero is torn between his love for his God and his desire to be a full partner in Torah and Yeshiva life, and his sexual orientation. The recognition of his attraction to men creates a difficult conflict for the hero, both with his faith and his identity. The film touches on the loaded subject carefully and does not suggest any solution to the dilemma facing the protagonist.

Along with other developments of the time, such as the establishment of organizations such as Bat Kol, Havruta and Hod, statements by rabbis such as Yuval Cherlow who deviated from the traditional position on the subject, and documentaries "Trembling Before G-d" and "Keep Not Silent", the film led to the opening of an open internal discussion within Religious Zionism on the status of gays and lesbians in the religious society, and the beginning of a change in relation to them.

It won the best drama award at the 2008 Jerusalem Film Festival and is regarded as a significant cinematic effort to bridge the gap between religious beliefs and acceptance of sexual minorities.

== Plot ==
The film examines Ohad's confrontation with himself, his God and his environment.

Ohad, the protagonist, is serving in the Israel Defense Forces as a Hesder student. He has not told anyone about his sexual orientation. He feels that his sexuality contradicts his religious identity and he turns to an anonymous religious call center called "Atzat Lev" (a name that is a variation on a real organization called "Atzat Nefesh"), which claims to treat homosexuality with the help of conversion therapy. Following the phone calls, Ohad begins by saying the "Tikkun HaKlali" and fasting for forty days and believes that if he completes the period, he will stop being attracted to men. The painful rubber band on his wrist is also supposed to help him deal with the forbidden feelings.

Towards the end of the forty days of fasting and prayers, Nir, beloved of Ohad, returns to the yeshiva from the army. The encounter overwhelms Ohad with strong feelings and difficult questions towards himself and his God. Following the meeting with Nir, Ohad realizes that he has not really changed, and the forty days of correction were of no help. When Nir finds out about Ohad's feelings, he is unsympathetic and retorts "You should leave the yeshiva". Later, Nir does not allow Ohad, who is a Cohen, to bless the blessing of priests ("Cohanim"), since "how can you pray if the Torah says that this is an abomination?". Ohad decides to remove the rubber band from his wrist and goes in to say the blessing of the priests, a step that shows he is at peace with the situation.

== Critical Responses ==
According to research, the film signifies the emergence of New Israeli Religious Queer Cinema at the beginning of the third millennium. This genre is notable for being driven by religious filmmakers who are also members of sexual minorities, aiming to foster tolerance and acceptance of homosexuality within Jewish Orthodox communities in Israel. In this sense, the film represents the dual challenges of combating negative representations of religious communities and addressing the heightened stigmatization often directed at religious LGBTQ+ individuals.

== Awards ==
The film received positive reviews immediately upon its screening and was shown at several film festivals in Israel and around the world. The film won the following awards:

- First Prize, Best Fictional Film, Ma'aleh Graduating ceremony, 2007
- First Prize, Best Drama, Jerusalem Film Festival (Wolgin) 2008
- Audience Award, International Student Film Festival, Tel Aviv, 2008
- First Prize, Best Short Film, The Jerusalem International Jewish Film Festival 2008
- Bronze Phoenix Award, Warsaw International Jewish Film Festival 2009
- First Prize, Best Israeli Short Film, FilmIsReal Amsterdam, May 2009

== Cast ==
Actor	Role
Uri Lachmi	Ohad
Omer Zonenshein	Nir
Yehonadav Perlman	The Rabbi
Itzik Haikeh	Benni
Yariv Kook	The voice of Menachem
Sigalit Ya'akobi	The voice of the woman

== See also ==
- Homosexuality and Judaism
- Trembling Before G-d (2001)
- Say Amen (2005) a documentary about a gay man coming out to his Orthodox family
- Paper Dolls (film)
- Yossi and Jagger (2002) an Israeli romantic drama film about two soldiers on the Israel – Lebanon border
