= Love the Donkey =

Studio album by Cyro Baptista
- Released: November 22, 2005
- Recorded: 2005
- Studio: Bennett Studios, Englewood, NJ
- Genre: World music
- Length: 51:47
- Label: Tzadik; 7614
- Producer: Cyro Baptista, Jamie Saft

Cyro Baptista chronology
Beat the Donkey (2002)	Love the Donkey (2005)	Banquet of the Spirits (2008)

Love the Donkey is an album by percussionist Cyro Baptista's percussion and dance ensemble Beat the Donkey, which was released on the Tzadik label in 2005. The album was privately released as Beat the Donkey Beat in 2004.

== Reception ==
Professional ratings
Review scores
Source	Rating
Allmusic	4.5/5 stars
The Penguin Guide to Jazz Recordings	3/4 stars

Thom Jurek of Allmusic said "With Love the Donkey, Baptista has done what was seemingly impossible. As urban musicians strive to learn more about roots music to incorporate into their sound, he has done the reverse: found the music of the city, of the modern, and of the postmodern, and made it serve folk music. In this wild and woolly party, where almost anything goes, the ancient is tied inseparably to the present, and creates a new and joyous future". On All About Jazz Sean Patrick Fitzell observed "A panoply of percussion erupts from Love the Donkey as Cyro Baptista and his merry troupe of percussionists and special guests unleash fourteen tracks of manic energy and irrepressible fun. It serves as an effective antidote to overly cerebral and self-consciously serious music... Baptista's music for his Beat the Donkey ensemble works because it's done honestly and with contagious enthusiasm. Love the Donkey testifies that humor does indeed belong in music".

== Track listing ==
All compositions by Cyro Baptista except as indicated

1. "American Constitution" – 2:54
2. "Anarriê" – 3:23
3. "Rio de Jamaica" (Peter Apfelbaum, Cyro Baptista) – 5:44
4. "Forró for All" – 4:54
5. "Tap on the Cajon" – 3:12
6. "Frevo de Rua" – 2:19
7. "Bottles" – 3:19
8. "Caboclinho" (Naná Vasconcelos) – 1:41
9. "Matan" (Baptista, Amir Ziv) – 3:26
10. "Immigrant Song" (Jimmy Page, Robert Plant) – 3:11
11. "Maria Teresa" (Viva DeConcini, Chikako Iwahori) – 6:07
12. "Olivia – Step on the Roach" (Trey Anastasio, Peter Apfelbaum) – 4:39
13. "Movie Screen" – 2:33
14. "Pandeirada" – 4:25
15. "Beat the Donkey" [video] – 3:05

== Personnel ==
- Cyro Baptista – percussion, vocals
- Jamie Saft – keyboards, guitar, bass (tracks 2, 3, 6 & 9–11)
- Peter Apfelbaum – keyboards, saxophone (tracks 3, 4, 7 & 12)
- Robert Curto – accordion (tracks 4, 10 & 11)
- Viva de Concini – guitar, percussion, vocals
- Amir Ziv – percussion, drums, vocals
- Chikako Iwahori, Max Pollak, Scott Kettner, Tim Keiper, Ze Mauricio – percussion, vocals
- Art Baron – trombone (tracks 3 & 12)
- Chuck MacKinnon – trumpet (tracks 3 & 12)
