= Serenity Knolls =

Studio album by Bill Brovold & Jamie Saft
- Released: 2017
- Recorded: March 31, 2017
- Studio: Potterville International Sound, Kingston, NY
- Genre: Jazz
- Length: 76:28
- Label: RareNoise RNR076
- Producer: Jamie Saft

Jamie Saft chronology
Strength & Power (2016)	Serenity Knolls (2017)	Loneliness Road (2017)

Serenity Knolls is an album by guitarists Bill Brovold and Jamie Saft released on the RareNoise label in 2017.

== Reception ==
Professional ratings
Review scores
Source	Rating
All About Jazz	3.5/5 stars

On All About Jazz, Dan Bilawsky called it "an album of front porch twang-and-strum, evoking peacefulness on the prairies and offering one American idyll after another" noting "Bill Brovold and Jamie Saft have managed to capture the heart, spirit, and sound of a country day in their duo explorations. Heartland, hearth, and home sweet home are well-represented on Serenity Knolls". Chronogram's James Keepnews wrote "Although Kingston-based Rasta polymath Jamie Saft is best known as an accomplished keyboardist and studio maven, his recorded work as a guitarist dates as far back as two decades ... His dobro and lap steel skills get a rare, ample, and ravishing workout in this new collaboration with his fellow local multi-instrumentalist, guitarist Bill Brovold. The album title references the rehab center where Jerry Garcia died, striking a fitting balance for these 12 often stark tone poems—some warm and serene, others as dark and searching as the emotions upon the loss of a loved one. Much of the darkness comes from Brovold's chimes-at-midnight, dirge-y chordal atmospheres enveloping Saft's adept, pealing slide chorales".

== Track listing ==
All compositions by Bill Brovold and Jamie Saft

1. "Sweet Grass" – 8:33
2. "Mitchimakinak" – 7:25
3. "Saddle Horn" – 4:58
4. "Wendigo" – 4:23
5. "Thermopolis" – 8:46
6. "The Great American Bison" – 6:08
7. "Bemidji" – 5:42
8. "No Horse Seen" – 5:02
9. "Splintering Wind" – 5:02
10. "Greybuli" – 6:54
11. "Serenity Knolls" – 6:35
12. "Silent Midpoint" – 7:00

== Personnel ==
- Bill Brovold – electric guitar
- Jamie Saft - dobro, lap steel guitar
