= In the Mirror of Maya Deren =

- Directed by: Martina Kudláček
- Written by: Martina Kudláček
- Produced by: Johannes Rosenberger
- Starring: Miriam Arsham; Stan Brakhage; Chao Li Chi; Rita Christiani; Maya Deren
- Cinematography: Wolfgang Lehner
- Edited by: Henry Hills
- Music by: John Zorn
- Distributed by: Sixpack Film; Zeitgeist Films
- Release date: October 2001 (Vienna International Film Festival)
- Running time: 103 min.
- Countries: Austria; Switzerland; Germany
- Languages: English; French

The documentary In the Mirror of Maya Deren (Im Spiegel der Maya Deren, 2001) is a film about avant garde filmmaker Maya Deren (1917-1961) by Austrian film maker Martina Kudláček. It is based on the biography The Legend of Maya Deren. The soundtrack to this documentary was created by the avant-garde composer John Zorn.
