= Filmworks X: In the Mirror of Maya Deren =

Soundtrack album by John Zorn
- Released: 2001
- Genre: Avant-garde, jazz, classical
- Length: 51:41
- Label: Tzadik TZ 7333
- Producer: John Zorn

Filmworks chronology
Filmworks IX: Trembling Before G-d (2000)	Filmworks X: In the Mirror of Maya Deren (2001)	Filmworks XI: Secret Lives (2002)

John Zorn chronology
Songs from the Hermetic Theatre (2001)	Filmworks X: In the Mirror of Maya Doren (2001)	Live at Tonic 2001 (2001)

Filmworks X: In the Mirror of Maya Deren features a score for film by John Zorn. The album was released on Zorn's own label, Tzadik Records, in 2001 and contains music that Zorn wrote and recorded for the documentary film In the Mirror of Maya Deren on the life and work of Maya Deren directed by Martina Kudlácek.

== Reception ==
Professional ratings
Review scores
Source	Rating
Allmusic	4.5/5 stars

The Allmusic review by Thom Jurek awarded the album 4½ stars noting that "In the Mirror of Maya Deren is Zorn's most compelling work for film yet. As a conceptualist, Zorn is not to be outdone -- he sees things in total, and this score is one piece, full of segue, room, drift, and dream. Deren would have been at the very least pleased, and that is as high a compliment as can be paid to this wonderful work by one of the most prolific, poetic, and profound composers".

== Track listing ==
All compositions by John Zorn

1. "Drifting 1" - 2:13
2. "Dancing" - 5:12
3. "Kiev 1" - 3:57
4. "Teiji's Time" - 2:16
5. "Nostalgia 1" - 3:41
6. "Filming" - 5:51
7. "Mirror Worlds" - 1:50
8. "Nightscape" - 2:27
9. "Nostalgia 2" - 4:21
10. "Haiti" - 2:34
11. "Kiev 2" - 4:42
12. "Voudoun" - 3:27
13. "Drifting 2" - 2:12
14. "Kiev 3" - 4:41
15. "Drifting 3" - 2:17

== Personnel ==
- Erik Friedlander - cello
- Jamie Saft - piano, organ, Wurlitzer
- Cyro Baptista - percussion
- John Zorn - piano, percussion (tracks 1, 4, 7, 13 & 15)
