= The Gift (John Zorn album) =

Studio album by John Zorn
- Released: March 27, 2001
- Genre: Exotica
- Length: 51:31
- Label: Tzadik TZ 7332
- Producer: John Zorn

John Zorn chronology
| Filmworks IX: Trembling Before G-d (2000) | The Gift (2001) | Madness, Love and Mysticism (2001) |

The Gift is an album by John Zorn released in 2001 on the Tzadik label as the third volume of his Music Romance Series and described as an album "for lovers only".

== Reception ==
Professional ratings
Review scores
| Source | Rating |
|---|---|
| AllMusic | 4/5 stars |
| The Penguin Guide to Jazz Recordings | 3/4 stars |

The AllMusic review by Sean Westergaard awarded the album four stars, stating, "Despite the undeniable beauty of the music, underneath the pretty pink wrapping and bows of the outer slipcase, Zorn has included several paintings of young girls in the cover art that some people might find slightly disturbing, as if to underscore the idea that beauty itself is highly subjective."

The authors of The Penguin Guide to Jazz called the album "Zorn's nod to mood-music barons such as Martin Denny" and wrote: "Douglas has most likely never sounded more lyrical than he does on 'Mao's Moon'."

Writing for One Final Note, Matt Bowden commented: "Zorn's melodic arrangements are the real stars here. Far from the freneticism he's famous for, Zorn opts instead for the languid, relying on the sepia-toned sway of Marc Ribot's guitar work through most of The Gift." He concluded: "The Gift is exactly what its title claims to be."

== Track listing ==
All compositions by John Zorn

1. "Makahaa" – 5:20
2. "The Quiet Surf" – 3:14
3. "Samarkan" – 6:41
4. "Train to Thiensan" – 3:51
5. "Snake Catcher" – 6:32
6. "Mao's Moon" (later retitled to "Moonlove") – 5:19
7. "Cutting Stone" – 7:10
8. "La Flor del Barrio" – 3:10
9. "Bridge to the Beyond" – 5:33
10. "Makahaa (reprise)" – 4:34

== Personnel ==
- Cyro Baptista – percussion
- Joey Baron – drums
- Jennifer Choi – violin
- Greg Cohen – bass (6)
- Dave Douglas – trumpet (6)
- Trevor Dunn – bass
- Mike Patton – voice (9)
- Raman Ramakishna – cello
- Marc Ribot – guitar
- Masumi Rostad – viola
- Ned Rothenberg – shakuhachi
- Jamie Saft – organ, Wurlitzer piano, piano, keyboards
- John Zorn – piano, theremin (9)
