= Breadcrumb Sins =

Studio album by Jamie Saft
- Released: May 21, 2002
- Recorded: December 2001 – January 2002, Frank Booth, Brooklyn
- Genre: Jazz
- Length: 48:01
- Label: Tzadik TZ 7162
- Producer: Jamie Saft

Jamie Saft chronology
Sovlanut (2000)	Breadcrumb Sins (2002)	The Only Juan (2002)

Breadcrumb Sins is an album by Jamie Saft which was released on the Tzadik label in 2002.

== Reception ==
Professional ratings
Review scores
Source	Rating
Allmusic	4/5 stars

In his review for Allmusic, Stephen Cook notes that "Backed by a combo featuring guitar, percussion, vocals, and turntables, Saft commands the stage here as he plays myriad instruments on this, his second Tzadik release".

== Track listing ==
All compositions by Jamie Saft

1. "Agam Haeysh" – 4:30
2. "Vesamcheynu Dub" – 4:17
3. "Fratricide" – 5:03
4. "Chet" – 4:47
5. "Blood on the Door" – 7:18
6. "Aveira Dub" – 6:12
7. "Treyf" – 4:07
8. "T'Khelet" – 6:42
9. "Peaceful World" – 5:05

== Personnel ==
- Jamie Saft – piano, Hammond organ, synthesizer, electronics, steel guitar, dumbek, saz, dubs, turntables, percussion, vocals
- Mr. Dorgon – turntables (track 7)
- Rob Haggis – percussion (track 6)
- Chris Kelly – guitar solo (track 3)
- Rick Quinones – vocals, guitar, effects (track 3 & 9)
- Vanessa Saft (tracks 7 & 8), Antony (track 5) – vocals
