= Paper Dolls (film) =

Paper Dolls (Bubot Niyar)
- Israeli-release poster
- בובות נייר
- Directed by: Tomer Heymann
- Written by: Tomer Heymann
- Produced by: Claudia Levin; Stanley Buchthal; Tomer Heymann
- Starring: see Participants
- Cinematography: Itai Raziel
- Edited by: Lavi Ben Gal
- Music by: Eli Soorani
- Distributed by: Strand Releasing
- Release dates: February 9, 2006 (Berlinale); September 6, 2006 (United States); October 26, 2006 (Israel)
- Running time: 80 minutes
- Countries: Israel; Switzerland; United States
- Languages: Hebrew; Tagalog; English
- Box office: $36,089

Paper Dolls (Hebrew: בובות נייר, Bubot Niyar) is a 2006 documentary by Israeli director Tomer Heymann, which follows the lives of transgender migrant workers from the Philippines who work as health care providers for elderly Orthodox Jewish men and perform as drag queens during their spare time. It also delves into the lives of societal outcasts who search for freedom and acceptance.

In 2013, the story was adapted as a musical and produced at the Tricycle Theatre in London.

== Story ==
The documentary followed five Filipino transsexuals, each in different stage of gender transition and often referred to by their feminine names, who have emigrated to Israel to work as health care providers for elderly Orthodox Jewish men. Religious rules forbid the Orthodox men from being touched by women, so their carers must be male. On their nights off, the transsexuals perform in Tel Aviv nightclubs as a drag group called "Paper Dolls". They are among 300,000 foreign immigrants who came to Israel in the wake of the Second Intifada to fill lowly jobs that had been handled by Palestinians. Their status is precarious because they cannot file for citizenship and their visas are revoked if they lose their jobs. Although the task of taking care of the elderly is not easy, the liberal atmosphere of their adopted country has allowed the Paper Dolls to be free, despite being viewed as outsiders, and they are able to earn enough money to send support to their families in the Philippines.

A main story told in the documentary concerns the relationship between Sally and her elderly ward Chaim, who lost his voice due to throat cancer. He urges her to learn Hebrew by having her recite a poem written by Yehuda Amichai, while he basks in Sally's warmth and wit. In contrast, when the Paper Dolls were arranged for an audition at TLV—the largest nightclub in Tel Aviv—the booker instead relegated them as geishas. They would bow by the entrance and were described by the booker, as well as other drag queens, as "unprofessional" and "fit only for a bus stop".

== Participants ==
- Salvador "Sally" Camatoy
- Chiqui Diokno
- Giorgio Diokno
- Francisco "Cheska" P. Ortiz Jr.
- Toran "Jan" Jacob Libas
- Efrenito "Nits" Manalili
- Jose "Neil" T. Datinguinoo
- Eduardo "Rika" Javar (died during production)
- Chaim Amir (died during production)
- Noa Heymann

== Production ==
The documentary, shot for a span of five years and 320 hours of videotape, was distilled from a six-part Israeli TV feature produced by Claudius Films, Ltd., Heymann Brothers Films, and Switzerland-based LM Media GmbH, in association with The Film Sales Company, through the research of Levin. Andrew Harwitz and Maja Hoffman were its associate and executive producers respectively. Additional cinematography were done by Levin, Heymann, Daniel Miran, and Gonen Glazer. Asaf Billet provided the graphic design. Alex Claudius served as the interviewer of the participants.

== Releases ==
Paper Dolls was shown around the film festival circuit, first in Berlin International Film Festival on February 9, 2006, then debuted in the United States at SILVERDOCS: AFI/Discovery Channel Documentary Festival on June 15 that same year. Its US theatrical premiere was held on September 6, 2006, in New York City's Film Forum. The documentary was also commercially released in Switzerland, 15 US states, and Tel Aviv.

Before its second release in the Philippines at the 2007 Israeli Film Festival, Paper Dolls was given an "X" rating by the country's Movie and Television Review and Classification Board, which would make it "unfit for public viewing" despite already being shown in a public cinema in Makati during the 2006 Cinemanila International Film Festival. The organizers of the Israeli Film Festival decided the film be shown in various universities around Metro Manila. The Region 1 DVD of Paper Dolls was released on March 13, 2007.

== Reception ==
=== Critical reception ===
Film critics have mostly-positive reviews on the documentary, with a 72% grade from review aggregator Rotten Tomatoes and 72% from Metacritic. Joshua Rothkopf of Time Out New York rated the documentary with 4 stars, calling it "strange and sad". Wesley Morris of The Boston Globe gave Paper Dolls 3½ out of 4 stars, lauding that the documentary does not center on drag culture but on "the discrepancy between the (subjects') self-image and their neighbors' failure to see them as more than freaks and foreigners". Ken Fox of TV Guide rated the documentary a 3 out of 4 stars, commenting that although "Heymann has a flair for drama and a way of making every scene he appears in all about him... the Paper Dolls themselves are funny and touching and their plight is relevant to any discussion about foreign workers." A.O. Scott of The New York Times stated that Paper Dolls "seeks to illuminate a subculture without allowing its curiosity to become exploitative or prurient". Michael Booth of The Denver Post gave it a 2½ star-rating out of 4, saying that the documentary underscores the subjects' role as "eternal outsiders". David Noh of Film Journal International stated that "despite Heymann's often clumsy technique and sometimes baldly opportunistic approach, a real human story emerges", and that the audience "sincerely root for these unlikely, uncomely souls". Kevin Thomas of Los Angeles Times writes that Heymann does not only bring an engaging poignancy and depth in Paper Dolls, but also a powerful universality.

Meanwhile, Russell Edwards of Variety wrote that Paper Dolls "mostly fails to transcend its ramshackle structure or penetrate the inner-lives of its subjects". Ed Gonzales of Slant Magazine gave 2 out of 4 stars, while lamenting that the documentary "only skims the surface of the Paper Dolls' personal lives, barely tapping into the dreams that motivate them on a daily basis".

=== Awards ===
Paper Dolls won three awards from independent juries in 2006 Berlin International Film Festival: Panorama Audience Award for a Feature Film; the Manfred-Salzgeber Prize; and the Siegessäule Reader's Jury Award. The documentary also received Best Cinematography and Best Music at Israeli Documentary Film Forum in 2006. That same year, it received the Audience Award at Pink Apple Film Festival held in Zürich, Switzerland, as well as the International Audience Award at Los Angeles Film Festival, and Best Documentary at Cinemanila International Film Festival held in Manila, Philippines. Paper Dolls also received the International Jury and the Audience Awards for a Documentary at 2007 Identities Queer Film Festival in Vienna, Austria, as well as the Audience Award for Best Documentary at 22nd Turin International GLBT Film Festival that same year.

== Aftermath ==
Chiqui, Giorgio, and Jan went to London. Chiqui became a head nurse at a local hospital, while Giorgio and Jan continued to provide health care for elderly Jewish men. The three formed "Paper Dolls from Israel" and staged their performances in Filipino nightclubs. Meanwhile, Cheska was deported to the Philippines and managed a bar with her mother. As of 2013, the London Evening Standard reported: "Four of the Paper Dolls now live in London as British citizens: one is a qualified nurse working closely with a surgeon performing skin grafts, while another is married to a (male) German doctor."

After Chaim's death, Sally's visa became invalid, and she returned to the Philippines to take care of her mother, but eventually went to Sharjah, United Arab Emirates and worked as a hairdresser. On November 19, 2007, just 20 days after arriving in UAE, she was found dead on a pavement near a local mall. The reason for her death is still unknown, but her family claimed that an employee at Department of Foreign Affairs asked them if Sally was "the one who got bashed in the head". Heymann was informed of Sally's death during the Israeli Film Fest held in Manila, wherein the proceeds of the screening – as well as his own allowance – were given to Sally's family in Imus, Cavite.

== Stage adaptation ==
A stage adaptation of the same name by Philip Himberg was workshopped as part of the Sundance Theatre Lab in 2011 under the direction of Mark Brokaw. The workshop cast including Telly Leung, Francis Jue, Erik Liberman, Matthew Wilkas, Joan Barber, Yusef Boulov, Ron Domingo, Ben Graney, Lauren Klein, Orville Mendoza, Jon Rua and Ariel Shafir. A full production with new music by Nigel Lilley and Ben and Max Ringham (as well as songs used by the original Paper Dolls in their act), played at the Tricycle Theatre in London from 28 February 2013 to 13 April 2013. The play was directed by the theatre's artistic director, Indhu Rubasingham, with choreography by Alistair David. The cast included New York-based actor Francis Jue as Sally. Himberg said that he adapted the documentary for the stage, responding "to the story about immigration, about crossing borders, both literal and metaphorical. ... Also the clashing of cultures. ... And the generational thing, that these younger Asian men were caring in a very beautiful way for these older men who had been, frankly, abandoned by their families." Himberg met Rubasingham at the Sundance Theatre Programme. Himberg changed the story told in the documentary by creating a character, Yossi, partly based on Tomer Heymann, a filmmaker who grows in his perspective as he becomes familiar with the Dolls. The Dolls "dream of hitting the big time, and are convinced that allowing [Yossi] to make a documentary of their lives is the route to fame and fortune." The relationship between the brothers Chiqui and Giorgio is made more antagonistic (Giorgio is depicted as a troublemaker). Another new character is Chaim's daughter Adina. Songs in the piece include numbers that the original Dolls chose for their lip-synching act, but the stage performers sing live.

The piece received mostly mixed or negative reviews, although the relationship between Jue's Sally and Harry Dickman's Chaim was praised by most reviewers. The Daily Telegraph thought that Himberg "tries to include everything, and in the process, loses focus and tension. ... The raucous performances of musical numbers ... occupy an uncomfortable hinterland between deliberately amateurish and slightly painful. Richard Kent’s designs are handsome. ... Jue gives a haunting performance as Sally ... but both play and direction are compromised by a cloying sentimentality." The London Evening Standard, observed: "It’s a curious confection: part surprising study of cultural contrasts, part affectionate portrait of the world of the drag queen, and part exploration of some knotty ideas about homeland and identity. ... [The] production is both intimate and vigorous, with lashings of campness and a few genuinely moving moments. ... But along the way it seems a bit clunky, as if straining too hard for sincerity and interest." The Stage felt that, while the play has an "episodic, plodding sincerity", "it feels as though the inner lives have been drained from these characters". The Times, however, gave the piece four stars out of a possible five, writing: "As an illustration of the fragility of global immigrants, amplified by the no man’s land between genders and set in a land itself founded by a diaspora, it is hard to better. ... [It] is both achingly intimate and rich in universal themes: the courage of exile, the security of culture and religion, the moral beauty of tolerance. At its heart is the relationship (which repeatedly made me cry) between Chaim (Harry Dickman) ... and the wonderful Francis Jue as Salvatore – 'Sally'."

== See also ==
- Homosexuality and Judaism
- Trembling Before G-d (2001)
- Keep Not Silent (2002), a documentary about lesbian Orthodox Jewish women in Jerusalem
- Say Amen (2005), a documentary about a gay man coming out to his Orthodox family
- And Thou Shalt Love (2008), an Israeli short film that examines the difficulties of being both an Orthodox Jew and gay
