= Trouble: The Jamie Saft Trio Plays Bob Dylan =

Studio album by Jamie Saft
- Released: August 22, 2006
- Recorded: February 2006, Frank Booth, Brooklyn
- Genre: Jazz
- Length: 51:19
- Label: Tzadik TZ 8111
- Producer: Jamie Saft

Jamie Saft chronology
Music from the Film Murderball (2005)	Trouble: The Jamie Saft Trio Plays Bob Dylan (2006)	Merzdub (2008)

Trouble: The Jamie Saft Trio Plays Bob Dylan is an album by Jamie Saft which was released on the Tzadik label in 2006.

== Reception ==
Professional ratings
Review scores
Source	Rating
Allmusic	4/5 stars

In his review for Allmusic, Thom Jurek notes that "Saft feels no need to really improvise on the material, given its own merits, and comes up with a compelling, mysterious recording that brings folk music, jazz, blues, and other subtleties inherent in the work out".

== Track listing ==
All compositions by Bob Dylan

1. "What Was It You Wanted" – 7:46
2. "Ballad of a Thin Man" – 8:02
3. "Dignity" – 5:34
4. "God Knows" – 6:15
5. "Trouble" – 6:33
6. "Dirge" – 6:24
7. "Living the Blues" – 5:15
8. "Disease of Conceit" – 5:30

== Personnel ==
- Jamie Saft – piano, Hammond organ
- Greg Cohen – bass
- Ben Perowsky – drums
- Mike Patton (track 2), Antony (track 7) – vocals

== See also ==
- List of songs written by Bob Dylan
- List of artists who have covered Bob Dylan songs
