= Filmworks XII: Three Documentaries =

Soundtrack album by John Zorn
- Released: 2002
- Recorded: 2002
- Genre: Avant-garde, jazz, classical
- Length: 61:14
- Label: Tzadik TZ 7340
- Producer: John Zorn

Filmworks chronology
Filmworks XI: Secret Lives (2002)	Filmworks XII: Three Documentaries (2002)	Filmworks XIII: Invitation to a Suicide (2002)

John Zorn chronology
Filmworks XI: Secret Lives (2002)	Filmworks XII: Three Documentaries (2002)	Filmworks XIII: Invitation to a Suicide (2002)

Filmworks XII: Three Documentaries is an album containing three scores by John Zorn for documentary films released on Zorn's own label, Tzadik Records, in 2002. It features music that Zorn wrote and recorded for Homecoming (2002), a tribute documentary about the dance program at Performance Space 122 in New York by Charles Dennis, Shaolin Ulysses (2002) a film by Mei-Juin Chen and Martha Burr that follows Shaolin monks living and training in the United States, and Family Found (2002), a portrait of outsider artist Morton Bartlett which was directed by Emily Harris.

== Reception ==
The Allmusic review by Thom Jurek awarded the album 4½ stars noting that "The music here is, not unexpectedly, all over the map, but Zorn's focus is not; he is a keen student of the image, and listening to the way he crafts his music for the movies is more than a little revealing of his intensely methodological approach to seeing both the image as it unfolds and the music itself as it tends carefully to the projected frame... Zorn's Film Works volumes keep on coming, with each one being more complex, asking more questions, and composed more beautifully than the last. This is among the finest recordings of his music ever released".

Professional ratings
Review scores
Source	Rating
Allmusic	4.5/5 stars

== Track listing ==
1. "Vocal Phase" - 3:49
2. "The Lips At Sway" - 5:07
3. "The Well Tuned Harmonica" - 1:35
4. "Dance Piece" - 2:10
5. "Midnight Flight" - 2:12
6. "Chippy Charm" - 1:35
7. "Shaolin Spirit" - 3:01
8. "Bamboo Forest" - 1:24
9. "Shaolin Ulysses" - 2:00
10. "Shaolin Bossa" - 3:16
11. "Travelling West" - 2:43
12. "Temple Song" (traditional) - 2:25
13. "Shaolin Family" - 1:16
14. "Nostalgia" - 0:54
15. "Shaolin Mambo" - 2:57
16. "Transition" - 1:25
17. "Shaolin Bossa" (fast) - 2:22
18. "Vegas" - 1:03
19. "Kung Fu Percussion" - 1:50
20. "Shaolin Spirit" (duo) - 5:12
21. "Shaolin Bossa Vibe" - 1:54
22. "Shaolin Dream" - 1:43
23. "Shaolin Ulysses" (end titles) - 2:10
24. "Family Found" (vocal) - 2:33
25. "Family Found" (solo arco) - 1:09
26. "Family Found" (solo pizz) - 0:46
27. "Family Found" (cello) - 2:31

All Music by John Zorn (except 12 - arranged by John Zorn)

- Produced by John Zorn
- Recorded at Frank Booth, Brooklyn (New York) in 2002

== Personnel ==
- John Zorn (1-6) - organ, glass harmonica, Wurlitzer piano
- Mark Feldman (1-6) - violin
- Jennifer Charles (1, 24-27) - voice
- Jamie Saft (2) - Wurlitzer piano
- Marc Ribot (7-23) - guitar
- Min Xiao-Fen (7-23) - pipa
- Trevor Dunn (7-23) - bass
- Roberto Juan Rodríguez (7-23) - percussion
- Cyro Baptista (7-23) - percussion
- Erik Friedlander (24-27) - cello
