= Solo a Genova =

Live album by Jamie Saft
- Released: January 26, 2018
- Recorded: March 3, 2017
- Venue: Teatro Carlo Felice, Genoa, Italy
- Genre: Jazz
- Length: 64:00
- Label: RareNoise RNR088
- Producer: Jamie Saft

Jamie Saft chronology
Loneliness Road (2017)	Solo a Genova (2018)	Blue Dream (2018)

Solo a Genova is a live solo album by keyboardist Jamie Saft recorded at the Teatro Carlo Felice in Italy and released on the RareNoise label in early 2018.

== Reception ==
Professional ratings
Review scores
Source	Rating
All About Jazz	4.5/5 stars
All About Jazz	4.5/5 stars
Tom Hull	B+

On All About Jazz, Dan McClenaghan said "Pianist Jamie Saft's Solo A Genova is a revelation ... he proves himself strikingly virtuosic, lushly harmonic, and beautifully fluid ... Solo A Genova showcases his uplifting, steeped-in-the-American-sound soul" while Doug Collete noted "Jamie Saft's first solo album in his twenty-five year career, Solo a Genova, captures this restless, daring artist interpreting a selection of songs that reflect his eclectic taste as a reflection of his customary willingness to challenge himself. The sum effect of hearing this recording from Italy in March of 2017 is an altogether glorious experience made all the more stirring by the inclusion of audience applause". Broadway World observed "Solo a Genova is Saft's highly emotive take on jazz standards and other uniquely American compositions ... The rare, emotional outpouring and transformative power of Saft's piano is in evidence throughout Solo a Genova, his brilliant solo piano debut". A Jazz Noise's Dave Foxall wrote "Jamie Saft’s first solo album is an unrestrained experience, taking an eclectic mix of material – jazz, rock, pop, blues, modernist classical, and a few Saft originals – and creating an hour’s coherent listening without sacrificing any of the variety ... Blues spirit, classical lyricism, jazz dexterity – as solo piano albums go, slot it into your collection right next to Mingus Plays Piano, Jarrett’s Köln and Monk’s Alone in San Francisco.

== Track listing ==
1. "The Makings of You" (Curtis Mayfield) – 3:37
2. "Human/Gates" (Jimmy Jam, Terry Lewis/Jamie Saft) – 4:41
3. "Naima" (John Coltrane) – 5:42
4. "Sharp Dressed Man" (Billy Gibbons, Dusty Hill, Frank Beard) – 7:10
5. "Overjoyed" (Stevie Wonder) – 4:36
6. "Po' Boy" (Bob Dylan) – 4:05
7. "The New Standard/Pinkus" (Saft) – 12:43
8. "Blue Motel Room" (Joni Mitchell) – 6:10
9. "The Houseatonic at Stockbridge" (Charles Ives) – 4:09
10. "Blue in Green" (Bill Evans, Miles Davis) – 3:33
11. "Restless Farewell" (Bob Dylan) – 7:31

== Personnel ==
- Jamie Saft - piano
