= Madness, Love and Mysticism =

Studio album by John Zorn
- Released: April 24, 2001
- Genre: Avant-garde, contemporary classical music
- Length: 52:04
- Label: Tzadik TZ 7065
- Producer: John Zorn

John Zorn chronology
The Gift (2001)	Madness, Love and Mysticism (2001)	Songs from the Hermetic Theatre (2001)

Madness, Love and Mysticism is an album of contemporary classical music by American composer John Zorn released in 2001 on the Tzadik label.

== Reception ==
Professional ratings
Review scores
Source	Rating
Allmusic	4.5/5 stars
Pitchfork Media	7.6/10 stars

The Allmusic review by Thom Jurek awarded the album 4½ stars noting that "The work is full of sad, frenetic beauty and pathos. Ultimately, Zorn has proved all the critics wrong; he is not merely "dabbling" in classical music. In fact, as this trio of selections proves, he is out to take it over for good. Let's hope he succeeds".

Writing for Pitchfork Media, Dominique Leone stated "Madness, Love and Mysticism is Zorn playing roots music. That is, after years of forging his own path (albeit one very informed by an interesting mix of influences), he's coming home, into the arms of Grandpa Messiaen and Uncle Cage... Diehard Zorn fans may find this album something of a breath of fresh air, if only to combat his recent stale surf-rock or his long line of Masada-branded products. As his classical compositions go, these are some of the most interesting, and it would seem he's slowly beginning to transcend his influences".

== Track listing ==
All compositions by John Zorn.

1. "Le Mômo" - 16:21
2. "Untitled" - 15:28
3. "Amour Fou" - 20:15

== Personnel ==
- Jennifer Choi - violin (tracks 1 & 3)
- Stephen Drury - piano (tracks 1 & 3)
- Erik Friedlander - cello (tracks 2 & 3)
