= Black Shabbis =

Studio album by Jamie Saft
- Released: 2009
- Recorded: 2008
- Studio: Electric Plant Studios, Brooklyn, NY
- Genre: Heavy metal
- Length: 59:08
- Label: Tzadik TZ 8133
- Producer: Jamie Saft

Jamie Saft chronology
Merzdub (2008)	Black Shabbis (2009)	A Bag of Shells (2010)

Black Shabbis is an album by multi-instrumentalist Jamie Saft which was released on the Tzadik label in 2009. The extreme metal album examines a number of antisemitic concepts and incidents throughout history.

== Reception ==
Professional ratings
Review scores
Source	Rating
Allmusic	4/5 stars

In his review for Allmusic, Thom Jurek notes that "Black Shabbis is not for everybody, not even some Saft fans necessarily, but it is a powerful, excellent work that uses the metal genre well – expertly even – and will convince headbangers of its essential importance as one of the voices out there that stands tall and defiant in the face of much of the anti-Semitism that is promoted by some black and death metal bands. For everyone else, it is an angry howl of both pain and resistance whose anger is carried beautifully as the artist's ultimate weapon: his imagination and creativity to provoke, to give pause and reflection". Metal Reviews stated "Black Shabbis takes in a range of styles, and taking into account the previous works of its creator it's difficult to know whether Black Shabbis is a serious attempt at making a metal record, or more a pastiche of the genre as a whole ... Black Shabbis has some good ideas, but it's an awkward, bitty album. Saft clearly has talent, but he's effectively crippled by a weird, overly dry production and a steadfast refusal to stick to any one idea. Still, there's hope here, and if Jamie Saft ever raises his game and makes a Black Shabbis II he might be on to a good thing. As it is, Black Shabbis is an interesting idea with a rather messy execution". Keith Kahn-Harris wrote that "Black Shabbis is not the product of a metal band rooted in the metal scene, but of a one-off project that sets out to explore a particular aesthetic ... Saft is clearly a genius at wielding and manipulating the musical tools available in the metal armoury. Contrary to the stereotype of metal as a stock of banal clichés played by morons, metal has diversified enormously in the last three decades, creating a sophisticated and complex panopoly of sounds and possibilities. Saft shows no loyalty to any one style and the tracks skip radically between influences and sub-genres ... Black Shabbis will provide unnerving delights for anyone like me who is as obsessed with the possibilities of distorted guitar as they are with Jewish identity".

== Track listing ==
All compositions by Jamie Saft

1. "Black Shabbis - The Trail of Libels" – 2:41
2. "Blood" – 2:55
3. "Serpent Seed" – 3:41
4. "Der Judenstein (The Jewry Stone)" – 9:05
5. "Army Girl" – 6:43
6. "King of King of Kings" – 4:52
7. "Kielce" – 13:53
8. "Remember" (Lyrics by Vanessa Saft) – 6:36
9. "The Ballad of Leo Frank" – 8:58

== Personnel ==
- Jamie Saft – guitar, bass, vocals, organ, synthesizer, Mellotron
- Trevor Dunn – bass (tracks 2–7)
- Mike Pride (tracks 2–7), Bobby Previte (track 9), Dmitriy Shnaydman (tracks 4 & 8) – drums
- Mr. Dorgon (track 7), Vanessa Saft (track 8) – vocals
