= The Only Juan =

Live album by Jerry Granelli and Jamie Saft
- Released: August 6, 2002
- Recorded: 2001
- Venue: Pequot Library, Southport, CT
- Genre: Jazz
- Length: 48:01
- Label: Love Slave Lvs 105

Jamie Saft chronology
Breadcrumb Sins (2002)	The Only Juan (2002)	Astaroth: Book of Angels Volume 1 (2005)

The Only Juan is a live album by drummer Jerry Granelli and keyboardist Jamie Saft which was recorded in Southport, Connecticut and released on the Love Slave label in 2002.

== Reception ==
Professional ratings
Review scores
Source	Rating
Allmusic	3/5 stars

In his review for Allmusic, David R. Adler notes that "Drummer/percussionist Jerry Granelli and organist/pianist Jamie Saft team up on this quirky and fairly chaotic set of duets. ... The two principals cover a lot of ground, from blistering groove and noise to extreme minimalism to faux cocktail music and '70s folk ... Even when they cross the line into kitsch, Granelli and Saft bring a unique perspective to live interaction and sound production".

== Track listing ==
All compositions by Jamie Saft and Jerry Granelli except where noted

1. "Solo Bells" – 1:03
2. "Baby San" – 4:42
3. "Short" – 0:15
4. "Gong" – 6:27
5. "Short Two" – 0:22
6. "Difficult Dread" – 5:15
7. "Boinger" – 1:26
8. "Rainy Night House" (Joni Mitchell) – 4:23
9. "Soloduet" – 5:20
10. "Club Date" – 3:02
11. "I Mean You" (Thelonious Monk) – 4:16
12. "Clear the Room" – 1:24
13. "SMD" – 2:17
14. "Don't Stop" (Steve Perry, Jonathan Cain, Neal Schon) – 3:35
15. "Jerry Jerry Woo" – 1:38

== Personnel ==
- Jerry Granelli – drums, voice
- Jamie Saft - piano, organ, voice
- Chris Kelly - bass, vocals (track 6)
- J. Anthony Granelli - bells, things, vocals (track 6)
