= Trembling Before G-d =

2001 film by Sandi Simcha DuBowski

- DVD cover
- Directed by: Sandi Simcha DuBowski
- Produced by: Sandi Simcha DuBowski; Marc Smolowitz
- Starring: Shlomo Ashkinazy; Rabbi Steven Greenberg
- Cinematography: David W. Leitner
- Edited by: Susan Korda
- Music by: John Zorn
- Production company: Cinephil
- Distributed by: New Yorker Films
- Release date: 2001
- Running time: 84 minutes
- Countries: Israel; France; United States
- Languages: English; Yiddish; Hebrew
- Box office: $788,896

Trembling Before G-d is a 2001 American documentary film about gay and lesbian Orthodox Jews trying to reconcile their sexuality with their faith. It was directed by Sandi Simcha DuBowski, an American who wanted to compare Orthodox Jewish attitudes to homosexuality with his own upbringing as a gay Conservative Jew.

The film received ten award nominations, winning seven, including Best Documentary awards at the 2001 Berlin and Chicago film festivals. However, some criticized the film as showing a one-sided view of Orthodox Judaism's response to homosexuality. These include South African Chief Rabbi Warren Goldstein as well as Agudah spokesperson Avi Shafran.

The film is mostly in English, but also has some subtitled Yiddish and Hebrew. The film follows the lives of several gay and lesbian Orthodox Jews and includes interviews with rabbis and psychotherapists about Orthodox attitudes towards homosexuality. During the film's six-year production, DuBowski met hundreds of homosexual Jews, but only a handful agreed to be filmed due to fear of being ostracized from their communities. Many people who agreed to be interviewed are shown only in silhouette or with their faces pixelized. Most participants are American Jews, with one British and one Israeli Jew also featured. The film was successful at the box office, grossing over $788,896 on eight screens by its close date.

== Background ==
While a variety of views regarding homosexuality exist within the Orthodox Jewish community, Orthodox Judaism generally prohibits homosexual conduct. While there is disagreement about which acts come under core prohibitions, all of Orthodox Judaism puts certain core homosexual acts, including male-male anal sex, in the category of yehareg ve'al ya'avor, "die rather than transgress" – the small category of Biblically prohibited acts (including apostasy, murder, idolatry, adultery, and incest) which an Orthodox Jew is obligated under Jewish laws on self-sacrifice to die rather than commit.

Familiarity with sociological and biological studies, as well as personal contact with Jewish homosexuals, has brought some Orthodox leaders to a more sympathetic viewpoint, which views homosexuals as mentally ill rather than rebellious and advocates treatment rather than ostracism or jail. In the 1974 yearbook of the Encyclopedia Judaica, Rabbi Norman Lamm, a leader in Modern Orthodox Judaism, urged sympathy and treatment: "Judaism allows for no compromise in its abhorrence of sodomy, but encourages both compassion and efforts at rehabilitation." Lamm compared homosexuals to those who attempt suicide (also a sin in Jewish law), arguing that in both cases it would be irresponsible to shun or jail the sinner, but equally wrong for society to give "open or even tacit approval".

When Orthodox rabbi Steven Greenberg publicly announced that he was homosexual, Rabbi Moshe Tendler, a leading rabbi at the Modern Orthodox Yeshiva University where Greenberg was ordained as rabbi, stated "It is very sad that an individual who attended our yeshiva sunk to the depths of what we consider a depraved society," giving his opinion that Rabbi Greenberg's announcement is "the exact same as if he said, 'I'm an Orthodox Rabbi and I eat ham sandwiches on Yom Kippur.' What you are is a Reform Rabbi."

== Synopsis ==
Trembling Before G-d interviews and follows several gay and lesbian Orthodox Jews, many only seen in silhouette, and also interviews several rabbis and psychologists regarding their views on homosexuality in Orthodox Judaism. The film repeatedly returns to several characters:

David is an observant Orthodox Jewish doctor from Los Angeles who has spent a decade trying to reconcile his homosexuality with Judaism. He has tried numerous forms of "treatment", from eating figs and praying to wearing a rubber band on his wrist to flick whenever he thinks of men, but to no avail. During the course of the film, David decides to visit the Chabad rabbi to whom he first came out.

Israel David Fishman is a 58-year-old New Yorker who decided he could not be gay and Orthodox, and turned his back on his religion, though not before his family forced him into electroshock therapy to try to cure him. Now a tour guide in the Haredi neighborhoods of New York, the film follows him as he gives a tour, psychoanalyzes himself and decides, on the 25th anniversary of being with his life partner, to call his 98-year-old father, a rabbi, whom he has not seen in over twenty years.

Michelle is another New Yorker, in her forties, who believed she was the only Hasidic lesbian in the world and as a consequence allowed herself to be pressured into marriage. However, she got divorced and was subsequently ostracized by her family and community when they discovered she was homosexual. The film shows her visiting her old neighborhood and an Orthodox fair.

Rabbi Steven Greenberg, one of the founding members of the Jerusalem Open House, a gay rights organization in Israel which provides support to gay Orthodox Jews and their families, who is sometimes called "the world’s first openly gay Orthodox rabbi", discusses parents' reactions to their children coming out, as well as traditional interpretations of the prohibitions on homosexual acts in the Torah.

Shlomo Ashkenazy is a gay psychotherapist who has run a confidential support group for Orthodox gay men for nearly 20 years. He is interviewed about the effects of Orthodox attitudes to homosexuality and the reactions of rabbis to gay Jews.

Mark is the English son of a Haredi rabbi. Coming out at 15, he was expelled from seven yeshivas for homosexual activity before becoming a drag queen, and is now dying of AIDS-related illness. He visits several yeshivas and other religious sites throughout the film. He remains upbeat, at one point saying, "Being a Jew is such a nice present to receive."

"Malka" and "Leah" are two observant Orthodox lesbians who have been together for ten years, which has destroyed Malka's relationship with her family. They speak frankly about their lives in the film and discuss their fears that they may not end up in heaven together. They are shown preparing for Shabbat, and Leah gives advice to a married Hasidic lesbian who is terrified her husband will find out and take away her children.

"Devorah" is a married Hasidic lesbian living in Israel. She only appears in silhouette with an electronically modified voice. She considered her twenty-year-long marriage a lie, and can only cope by taking antidepressants. The film follows her as she attends her first gay pride parade, where she is offended by the anti-orthodox sentiment of its speakers.

== Production ==
Sandi Simcha DuBowski was making videos about the Christian religious right when he began to examine his own upbringing as a gay Conservative Jew, and began making a personal video diary of his search for homosexuality among the Orthodox Jewish community. On the making of the film, DuBowski said, "I don't think it was until I met people who were kicked out of their families and their Yeshivas, in marriages betraying their spouses, that it became clear why I was doing this film. But then, for me it assumed an enormous level of responsibility to the people I met, to the issue, to the community." He met thousands of people, but only a few agreed to appear in the film, as most were too frightened of being expelled from their community. Even when interviewing those who did agree to appear, DuBowski had to hide his film equipment so their neighbors would not know that they had agreed to take part. As a result, the documentary took six years to complete.

There is no narration, and the film may be considered to be an example of cinéma vérité. The film is also interspersed with silhouetted tableaus of Jewish religious practices, for example Shabbat. The language is predominantly English, with passages in Yiddish and Hebrew that are subtitled. Also subtitled are passages with significant amounts of "Yeshivish", Yiddish-influenced technical terms in Judaism; for example, posek is translated as "judge on Jewish law", and daven is translated as "pray".

The title is an allusion to the word Haredi (Hebrew: חֲרֵדִי), which can be interpreted as "one who trembles" in awe of God. The spelling of the word G-d in the film's title reflects practice by Orthodox Jews of avoiding writing a name of God, even in English. By omitting the middle letter, the word is not written in full, thus eliminating the possibility of accidentally destroying the written name of God, which would violate one of the 613 Mitzvot of Judaism (number 8 on Maimonides' list).

== Soundtrack ==
Filmworks IX: Trembling Before G-d

Soundtrack album by John Zorn
- Released: December 2000
- Recorded: June 2000
- Genres: Avant-garde, jazz, classical
- Length: 65:11
- Label: Tzadik TZ 7331
- Producer: John Zorn

Filmworks chronology
Filmworks VIII: 1997 (1998)	Filmworks IX: Trembling Before G-d (2000)	Filmworks X: In the Mirror of Maya Deren (2001)

John Zorn chronology
Cartoon S/M (2000)	Filmworks IX: Trembling Before G-d (2000)	The Gift (2001)

Filmworks IX: Trembling Before G-d is the ninth album of film scores by John Zorn. The album was released on Zorn's label, Tzadik Records, in 2000 and features the music that Zorn wrote and recorded for the documentary Trembling Before G-d. Five of the tracks are pieces from Zorn's Masada songbook.

The Allmusic review by Thom Jurek awarded the album four stars noting:

Trembling Before G-D is a high-water mark. Not for John Zorn, because he sets new ones for himself each and every time he releases something, but for other composers, particularly those of film soundtracks. Without the images, Zorn has given us a work of solemn beauty, a work that uses silence and tradition even as it reinvents the places in which they inhabit. Certainly this is his most "accessible" music, whatever that means, but it is also—simultaneously—sacred music, secular music, and American classical music of the highest order.

Professional ratings
Review scores
Source	Rating
Allmusic	4/5 stars

- Recorded June 2000 at Frank Booth, Brooklyn
- Produced by John Zorn

=== Personnel ===
- Chris Speed - clarinet
- Jamie Saft - piano, organ
- Cyro Baptista (12,17) - percussion
- John Zorn (6) - voice.

== Reception ==
=== Critical ===
Trembling Before G-d was put out on general release on October 21, 2001, in New York City, where it broke Film Forum's opening day box office records, grossing more than $5,500 on the first day of release. According to Box Office Mojo, it grossed $788,896 at the box office during its release. It was very warmly received by critics, one describing it: "With its testimony of anguish and joy, Trembling is a tribute to the human spirit, if not to the institutions that seek to define it." Critical reviews compiled by Rotten Tomatoes were 89% positive, the 34th highest rating on the website's Top Movies:Best of Rotten Tomatoes 2001 rankings. On Metacritic the film received a score of 66, indicating "Generally favorable reviews".

=== Religious ===
Trembling Before G-d has had a wide impact especially within the Orthodox Jewish world, where the reception has been mixed. Several Orthodox synagogues sponsored showings of the film all over the world, including in Israel. The Chief Rabbi of South Africa, Warren Goldstein, described the film as "intellectually shallow," commenting that "its one-sided caricature of Orthodox Judaism does not stimulate meaningful intellectual debate." A rabbi interviewed by DuBowski complained that the film "makes us appear to be narrow and bigoted". Arthur A. Goldberg, co-director of the Jewish ex-gay organization JONAH, wrote a letter to the editor of The Jerusalem Post lamenting the "film's biased and faulty assumption that same-sex attraction and behavior is irreversible" and that "opposing points of view were, in the reviewer's words, left 'lying on DuBowski's cutting room floor.'" Orthodox clinical psychologist Adam Jessel commented:

The film poignantly captures the torment of those torn between their religious beliefs and their same-sex attractions (SSA). One cannot help but feel compassion for DuBowski's interviewees who desperately miss the lifestyle, community and close family ties of the Orthodox world. Unfortunately, DuBowski's film goes further. Implicit in the film is the message that homosexuality is desirable, and that the interviewees' only struggle is having their choices accepted and validated by the community.

No Haredi Orthodox group spoke out in favor of Trembling Before G-d. Rabbi Avi Shafran, the spokesperson for Agudath Israel of America, one of the largest Haredi organizations, criticized the film with an article titled "Dissembling Before G-d". In his response, he holds that gay people can be cured through therapy, and that the movie is meant to promote homosexuality:

Unfortunately, though, "Trembling" seems to have other intents as well. While it never baldly advocates the case for broader societal acceptance of homosexuality or for the abandonment of elements of the Jewish religious tradition, those causes are subtly evident in the stark, simplistic picture the film presents of sincere, conflicted and victimized men and women confronted by a largely stern and stubborn cadre of rabbis. That picture is both incomplete and distorted. For starters, the film refuses to even allow for the possibility that men and women with homosexual predilections might ― with great effort, to be sure ― achieve successful and happy marriages to members of the opposite sex.

— Avi Shafran

DuBowski maintains that there is no agenda to Trembling Before G-d "beyond alleviating an immense amount of pain that people are going through", and that Judaism is lovingly portrayed. Indeed, several audience members at screenings asked afterwards how they could convert.

=== Accolades ===
Year	Group	Award	Result
2001	Washington Jewish Film Festival	Audience Award ― Special Mention	Won
2001	Sundance Film Festival	Grand Jury Prize	Nominated
2001	Seattle Gay and Lesbian Film Festival	Audience Award ― Favorite Documentary	Won
2001	L.A. Outfest	Grand Jury Award ― Outstanding Documentary Feature	Won
2001	Chicago International Film Festival	Gold Plaque	Won
2001	Berlin International Film Festival	Don Quixote Award ― Special Mention	Won
2001	Berlin International Film Festival	Teddy ― Best Film	Won
2002	Glitter Awards	Best Documentary voted by the U.S. Gay Press	Won
2002	Independent Spirit Awards	Truer Than Fiction Award	Nominated
2003	GLAAD Media Awards	Outstanding Documentary	Won
2004	Satellite Awards	Best Documentary DVD	Nominated

== Legacy ==
The DVD was released in 2003 and contains many extra features, such as extensive interviews with DuBowski and Rabbi Steven Greenberg. There is also a mini-documentary about reactions to the film around the world and what happened to the people who were featured in the documentary. The total running time for the special features is actually over 2 hours longer than the documentary itself.

With a seed grant from Steven Spielberg, the creators of the film have set up the Trembling Before G-d Orthodox Education Project, to teach Orthodox educators and rabbis about homosexuality, as well as convening the first Orthodox Mental Health Conference on Homosexuality and training facilitators to show the film to community leaders. Over 2000 principals, educators and school counselors have attended screenings within Israel's religious school system. The film has now been seen by an estimated 8 million people worldwide. Following the success of Trembling before G-d, DuBowski produced a documentary about gay devout Muslims entitled A Jihad for Love.

== See also ==
- Homosexuality and Judaism
- Keep Not Silent (2002), a documentary about lesbian Orthodox Jewish women in Jerusalem
- Say Amen (2005), a documentary about a gay man coming out to his Orthodox family
- And Thou Shalt Love (2008), an Israeli short film that examines the difficulties of being both an Orthodox Jew and gay
- Paper Dolls
