= Fight Against Babylon =

Studio album by New Zion Trio
- Released: 2011
- Recorded: 2011
- Studio: Potterville International Studios, New York
- Genre: Jazz, reggae
- Label: Veal Veal0007
- Producer: Jamie Saft, Craig Santiago

Jamie Saft chronology
Borscht Belt Studies (2011)	Fight Against Babylon (2011)	Chaliwa (2013)

Fight Against Babylon is an album by keyboardist Jamie Saft's New Zion Trio which was released on the Veal label in 2011.

== Reception ==
Professional ratings
Review scores
Source	Rating
PopMatters	8/10 stars
All About Jazz	3.5/5 stars

In his review for PopMatters, Sean Murphy notes that "What Saft manages to do on Fight Against Babylon is create an organic ambiance and, without any in-the-studio sorcery or clever manipulation (strategies he has already showcased on the aforementioned efforts), establish a deep, utterly pleasant groove". On All About Jazz, Eyal Hareuveni, said "producer and multi-instrumentalist Jamie Saft's New Zion Trio debut recording succeeds in blowing fresh winds in the traditional piano trio with dub aesthetics, citing King Tubby, Bob Marley, Bill Evans, Pharoah Sanders and Alice Coltrane as influences".

== Track listing ==
All compositions by Jamie Saft

1. "Slow Down Furry Dub" - 6:59
2. "Niceness" - 5:44
3. "The Red Dies" - 7:15
4. "Gates" - 4:59
5. "Hear I Jah" - 9:36
6. "I Shense" - 5:22
7. "Lost Dub" - 8:45
8. "Fire Blaze" - 9:44

== Personnel ==
- Jamie Saft - piano, organ
- Larry Grenadier - bass
- Craig Santiago - drums
