= Rita Christiani =

American actress

- Born: December 22, 1917; Port of Spain, Trinidad
- Died: May 23, 2008 (aged 90); Brooklyn, New York
- Occupations: Dancer; Actress
- Years active: 1940s

Rita Christiani (1917-2008) was a Trinidad-born American dancer who appeared in American films during the 1940s.

== Biography ==
Christiani was born in Port of Spain, Trinidad on December 22, 1917.

She danced and toured with the Katherine Dunham Company in the early 1940s. In the course of touring, Christiani met the independent avant-garde filmmaker, Maya Deren, and was given a role in Deren’s film Ritual in Transfigured Time (1946). Deren was the main character in the film and Christiani danced the role of Deren’s alter ego, their images interchanging in black and white counterpoint to the dancer Frank Westbrook. Anaïs Nin was also in the film.

Footage of Christiani from this film was included in the documentary In the Mirror of Maya Deren (2002) by Martina Kudlacek.

Christiani and Deren became close friends, sharing the bond of being uprooted from their native lands as children and coming to America.

Her other film appearances include The Black Swan (1942) starring Tyrone Power and Maureen O'Hara, Road to Morocco (1942) starring Bob Hope and Bing Crosby, and the musicals Thank Your Lucky Stars (1942) and Happy Go Lucky (1943).

After working in films and as a dancer, Christiani may have been a nurse in Chicago.

Christiani died on May 23, 2008, in Brooklyn, New York.

== Filmography ==
- Tales of Manhattan (1942) - young woman (uncredited)
- Road to Morocco (1942) - dancer (uncredited)
- The Black Swan (1942) - dancer (uncredited)
- Happy Go Lucky (1943) - as herself
- Cabin in the Sky (1943) - dancer (uncredited)
- I Walked with a Zombie (1943) - friend of Melise (uncredited)
- Thank Your Lucky Stars (1943) - Ice Cold Katie
- Ritual in Transfigured Time (1946) - as herself
