= Merzdub =

Studio album by Jamie Saft & Merzbow
- Released: October 30, 2006
- Recorded: March 2005, Bedroom, Tokyo and September–October 2005, Frank Booth, Brooklyn
- Genre: Avant-garde, noise music, dub
- Length: 71:25
- Label: Caminante Recordings CAMI 003
- Producer: Jamie Saft

Jamie Saft chronology
Trouble: The Jamie Saft Trio Plays Bob Dylan (2006)	Merzdub (2006)	Black Shabbis (2009)

Merzbow chronology
Bloody Sea (2006)	Merzdub (2006)	F.I.D. (2006)

Merzdub is an album by Jamie Saft performing compositions which used source material by Japanese noise artist Merzbow.

== Reception ==
Professional ratings
Review scores
Source	Rating
Allmusic	3.5/5 stars

In his review for Allmusic, Sean Westergaard notes that "This could be the most gentle introduction to the world of Merzbow yet".

== Track listing ==
All compositions by Jamie Saft and Merzbow

1. "Conquerer" – 9:13
2. "Beware Dub" – 9:16
3. "Skinning JLO" – 8:50
4. "Kantacky Fried Dub" – 6:36
5. "Visions Of Irie" – 6:43
6. "Dangermix" – 7:44
7. "Updub" – 10:48
8. "Slow Down Furry Dub" – 12:15

== Personnel ==
- Jamie Saft – vocals, guitar, bass, drums, organ, synthesizer, dubs
- Masami Akita – computer, source material
