= The New Standard (Jamie Saft album) =

Studio album by Jamie Saft, Steve Swallow and Bobby Previte
- Released: 20 May 2014
- Recorded: 2014 at Potterville International Studios in New York
- Genre: Jazz
- Length: 58:02
- Label: RareNoise RNR041
- Producer: Jamie Saft and Bobby Previte

Jamie Saft chronology
Chaliwa (2013)	The New Standard (2014)	Red Hill (2014)

The New Standard is an album by keyboardist Jamie Saft, bassist Steve Swallow and drummer Bobby Previte which was released on the RareNoise label in 2014.

== Reception ==
Professional ratings
Review scores
Source	Rating
Allmusic	4/5 stars
All About Jazz	4/5 stars

In his review for Allmusic, Thom Jurek notes that "The New Standard delivers a series of memorable modern compositions based on older forms but doesn't revel in nostalgia or irony. It's obvious from the end result how much these three massively talented players love this music, and it's quite logical how in such an informal setting, they reveal just how much there is to be discovered and learned from in them". On All About Jazz, Glenn Astarita said "In sum, the trio projects a refreshing slant, partly due to the respective musicians' distinctive and stylistic musical personas, that seamlessly transforms into this memorable spin on the conventional piano trio format". Andy Boeckstaens in London Jazz News wrote "It is hard to believe that Saft, Swallow and Previte have not previously worked together as a unit. Much more downhome than Downtown, this CD – all first takes, by the way - is beautifully simple and simply beautiful". In JazzTimes Mike Shanley observed "Saft proves himself extremely capable in more conventional jazz settings on The New Standard. ...Things are loose, with themes taking a backseat to group interaction, and the feeling is contagious. Even when the tune is limited to three chords, Swallow keeps it fresh with some heavy walking. If Previte isn’t dropping bombs, he turns the beat into a boogaloo shuffle or a soul groove".

== Track listing ==
All compositions by Jamie Saft except as indicated

1. "Clarissa" - 4:07
2. "Minor Soul" - 6:19
3. "Step Lively" (Saft, Bobby Previte, Steve Swallow) - 6:50
4. "Clearing" (Saft, Previte, Swallow) - 4:54
5. "Trek" (Saft, Previte, Swallow) - 4:11
6. "The New Standard" - 6:40
7. "I See No Leader" - 5:40
8. "Blue Shuffle" - 6:43
9. "All Things to All People" (Saft, Previte, Swallow) - 6:11
10. "Surrender the Chaise" - 6:28

== Personnel ==
- Jamie Saft - piano, organ
- Steve Swallow - bass
- Bobby Previte - drums
