= Chaliwa =

Studio album by New Zion Trio
- Released: 2013
- Recorded: 2013 at Potterville International Studios in New York
- Genre: Jazz, reggae, dub
- Length: 66:36
- Label: Veal VEAL0009
- Producer: Jamie Saft and Craig Santiago

Jamie Saft chronology
Fight Against Babylon (2011)	Chaliwa (2013)	The New Standard (2014)

Chaliwa is an album by Jamie Saft's New Zion Trio which was released on the Veal label in 2013.

== Reception ==
Professional ratings
Review scores
Source	Rating
PopMatters	8/10 stars

In his review for PopMatters, Sean Murphy notes that "the trio manages to pull off a variety of sounds, ranging from narcotic lounge music (in a good way) to traditional piano jazz (think Bill Evans by way of Kingston) and darker-than-dread reggae meditations. On Chaliwa, the players double down on the dub, and the results are every bit as satisfying this time out".

== Track listing ==
All compositions by Jamie Saft except as indicated

1. "Twelve Tribes" – 6:21
2. "Temples" – 8:53
3. "Chant It Down" (H.R., Jamie Saft, Craig Santiago) – 6:36
4. "Negus" – 8:16
5. "Pinkus" – 5:34
6. "Zion Heights" – 7:10
7. "Cherub Dub" – 5:55
8. "Rasta Lion Dub" – 9:52
9. "King's Bread" – 7:59

== Personnel ==
- Jamie Saft – piano, Fender Rhodes
- Brad Jones – bass
- Craig Santiago – drums
- H.R. – vocals (track 3)
