= Ragged Jack =

Studio album by Jamie Saft & Cuong Vu
- Released: May 20, 1997
- Recorded: March 26, 1995, Eastside Sound, New York City
- Genre: Jazz
- Length: 63:05
- Label: Avant Avan 068
- Producer: Jamie Saft & Cuong Vu

Jamie Saft chronology
Ragged Jack (1997)	Sovlanut (2000)

Ragged Jack is an album by keyboardist Jamie Saft and trumpeter Cuong Vu which was released on the Japanese Avant label in 1997.

== Reception ==
Professional ratings
Review scores
Source	Rating
Allmusic	4/5 stars

In his review for Allmusic, Nitsuh Abebe notes that "The resulting sessions have a fractured bop feel that might be marginally influenced by the downtown scene, but tend more toward solid, "traditional" free-jazz".

== Track listing ==
All compositions by Cuong Vu except as indicated

1. "Garbo" - 5:05
2. "Mr. Mister" (Jamie Saft) - 7:10
3. "Little Vina" - 9:58
4. "The Schmucklehead" - 12:50
5. "Mahunk" (Saft) - 4:38
6. "In Hear" (Andrew D'Angelo) - 6:06
7. "Or Anything Else" (D'Angelo) - 4:18
8. "Karin" (Saft) - 8:56
9. "Jack's in the House" - 3:22

== Personnel ==
- Jamie Saft - piano
- Cuong Vu - trumpet
- Andrew D'Angelo - alto saxophone, bass clarinet
- Jim Black - drums
