= Loneliness Road =

Studio album by Jamie Saft, Steve Swallow and Bobby Previte with Iggy Pop
- Released: May 26, 2017
- Recorded: June 2016 and January 2017
- Studio: Potterville International Studios, NY and Elite Music Studios, Miami, FL
- Genre: Jazz
- Label: RareNoise RNR077
- Producer: Jamie Saft, Christian Castagno

Jamie Saft chronology
Serenity Knolls (2017)	Loneliness Road (2017)	Solo a Genova (2018)

Loneliness Road is an album by keyboardist Jamie Saft, bassist Steve Swallow and drummer Bobby Previte with vocals by Iggy Pop featured on three tracks which was released on the RareNoise label in 2017.

== Reception ==
Professional ratings
Review scores
Source	Rating
All About Jazz	4.5/5 stars

On All About Jazz, Dan McClenaghan called it "A superior piano trio outing with bonus of Iggy Pop's cool contributions". In the Colorado Springs Independent Bill Kopp wrote "The trio of Saft, bassist Steve Swallow and drummer Bobby Previte turns in some unexpectedly accessible (and not at all avant-garde) jazz. And when Pop joins them on “Don’t Lose Yourself," “Everyday" and the title track, he delivers a gravelly, wavering vocal that is more Leonard Cohen than Stooges. Because it may mystify jazz fans and Iggy acolytes in equal measure, an open mind is necessary when listening to Loneliness Road".

== Track listing ==
All compositions by Jamie Saft except where noted

1. "Ten Nights" – 5:27
2. "Little Harbour" – 4:21
3. "Bookmaking" – 4:23
4. "Don't Lose Yourself" (Jamie Saft, Iggy Pop) – 4:44
5. "Henbane" – 4:01
6. "Pinkus" – 7:41
7. "The Barrier" – 5:44
8. "Nainsook" – 4:18
9. "Loneliness Road" (Saft, Pop) – 6:35
10. "Unclouded Moon" – 7:41
11. "Gates" – 2:52
12. "Everyday" (Saft, Pop) – 3:42

== Personnel ==
- Jamie Saft – piano, organ
- Steve Swallow – bass
- Bobby Previte – drums
- Iggy Pop – vocals (tracks 4, 9 & 12)
