= Keep Not Silent =

2004 film by Ilil Alexander

Keep Not Silent / OrthoDykes את שאהבה נפשי
- Directed by: Ilil Alexander
- Written by: Ilil Alexander
- Edited by: Oron Adar
- Music by: DJ E
- Distributed by: Women Make Movies
- Release date: 2004
- Running time: 52 minutes
- Country: Israel
- Languages: Hebrew & English

Keep Not Silent (Hebrew: את שאהבה נפשי, romanized: Et Sheaava Nafshi, lit. 'The one whom my soul loves') is a 2004 Israeli documentary film directed and produced by Ilil Alexander about three lesbians in Jerusalem.

It opened the San Francisco Jewish Film Festival in 2004. It won the Israeli Academy award for Best Documentary Film 2004. Also, it won numerous international awards in film festivals in Europe, North America, and the Far East, including best director, best documentary, audience awards, and others such as the DocAviv International Documentary Film Festival Award and the Gerhald-Klein-Publikums-Preis of the 11th Jewish Film Festival of Berlin and Potsdam.

Lesbianism is generally viewed as forbidden in Orthodox Judaism (see Homosexuality and Judaism). In Jerusalem, a number of Orthodox Jewish lesbians formed a group called OrthoDykes for mutual support and to learn the relevant issues in Jewish law. The film describes lives of three of them. One is Yudit, single and trying to have her same-sex marriage follow the Orthodox rules. Another is Miriam-Ester (pseudonym), who is married to a man and has ten children. She is suppressing her lesbian feelings in order to keep her marriage for religious reasons. Ruth, another married lesbian, keeps her marriage for the same reason, while her husband agrees to her seeing her lover regularly.

== See also ==
- Trembling Before G-d (2001)
- Say Amen (2005) a documentary about a gay man coming out to his Orthodox family
- And Thou Shalt Love (2008), an Israeli short film that examines the difficulties of being both an Orthodox Jew and gay
- Paper Dolls (film)
