= Filmworks XIII: Invitation to a Suicide =

Soundtrack album by John Zorn
- Released: 2002
- Genre: Avant-garde, jazz, classical
- Length: 57:34
- Label: Tzadik TZ 7341
- Producer: John Zorn

Filmworks chronology
Filmworks XII: Three Documentaries (2002)	Filmworks XIII: Invitation to a Suicide (2002)	Filmworks XIV: Hiding and Seeking (2003)

John Zorn chronology
Filmworks XII: Three Documentaries (2002)	Filmworks XIII: Invitation to a Suicide (2002)	Talisman: Live in Nagoya (2002)

Filmworks XIII: Invitation to a Suicide is an album containing a score for film by John Zorn which was released on Zorn's own label, Tzadik Records, in 2002 and features music written and recorded for a black comedy directed by Loren Marsh.

== Reception ==
Professional ratings
Review scores
Source	Rating
Allmusic	4.5/5 stars

The Allmusic review by Thom Jurek awarded the album 4½ stars noting that "Invitation to a Suicide, is easily the most profound, musically complex, and emotionally compelling of all of Zorn's soundtrack world... It stands as one of his masterworks in and out of the series, and will hopefully endure as a shining star in his already vast compositional catalog".

== Track listing ==
All compositions by John Zorn

1. "Invitation To A Suicide" - 4:38
2. "Suicide Waltz" - 4:21
3. "Shifting Sands" - 4:12
4. "East Greenpoint Rundown" - 4:08
5. "Time Twist" - 3:39
6. "The Suicide Kid" - 4:08
7. "Billet Doux" - 1:43
8. "Suicide Blues Part 1" - 4:15
9. "Trance Dance" - 3:13
10. "Lonely Are The Dumb" - 2:45
11. "Moon Moods" - 1:58
12. "Bugsy's Jazztet" - 2:12
13. "Suicide Blues Part 2" - 3:44
14. "Roary's Waltz" - 2:56
15. "Getting Suicidal" - 1:39
16. "Final Retribution" - 2:50
17. "Aftermath" - 3:09
18. "Unjust Reward" - 1:36
- Recorded at Frank Booth, Brooklyn (New York) in 2002

== Personnel ==
- Marc Ribot – guitar
- Rob Burger – accordion
- Erik Friedlander – cello
- Trevor Dunn – bass
- Kenny Wollesen – vibes, marimba, drums
