= Happy Go Lucky (1943 film) =

1943 film by Curtis Bernhardt

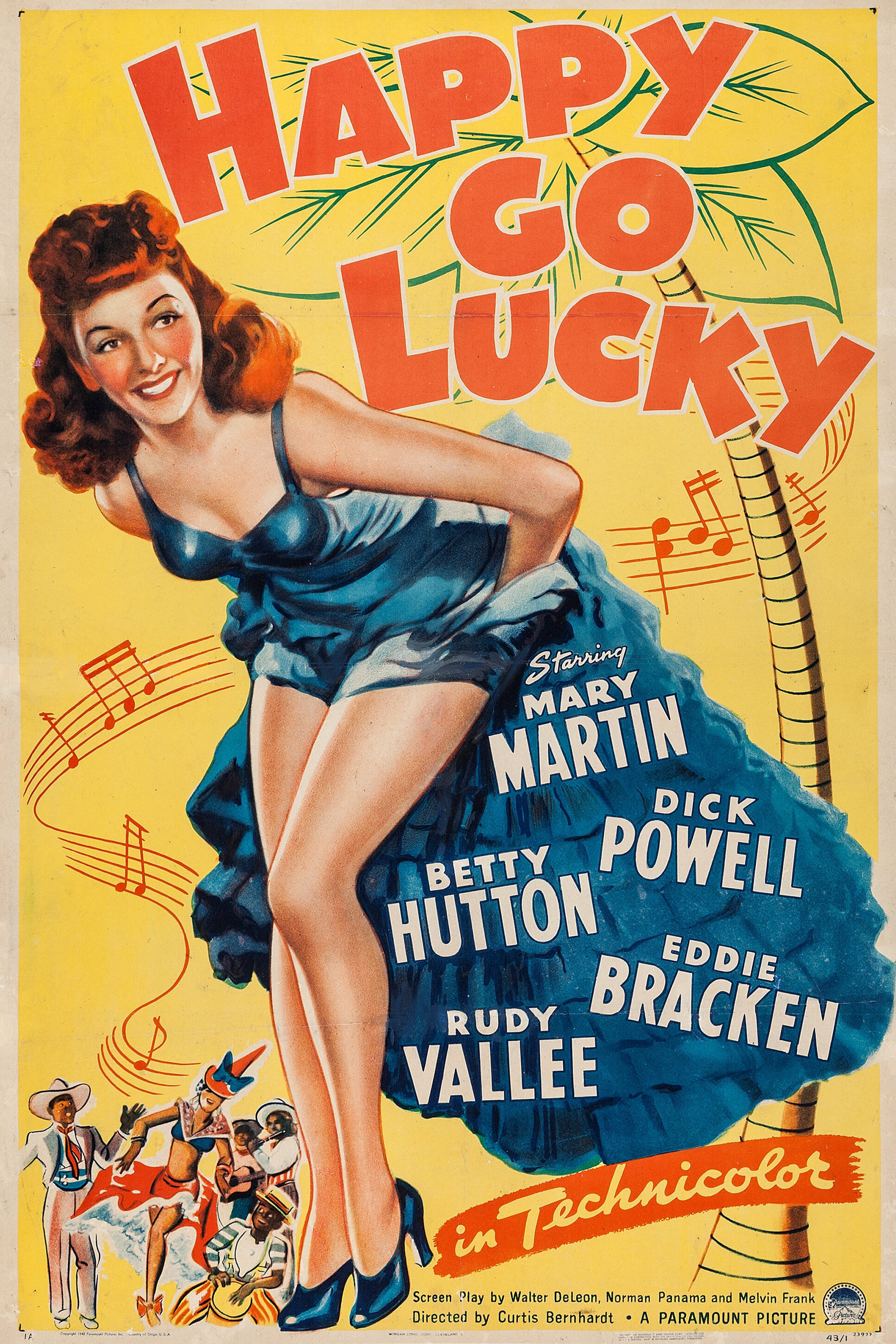
- Theatrical release poster
- Directed by: Curtis Bernhardt
- Screenplay by: Walter DeLeon; Melvin Frank; Norman Panama; John Jacoby (adaptation)
- Story by: Michael Uris
- Based on: "Cupid With A Beard" by Michael Uris
- Produced by: Harold Wilson
- Starring: Mary Martin; Dick Powell; Betty Hutton; Eddie Bracken; Rudy Vallée
- Cinematography: Wilfred M. Cline; Karl Struss
- Edited by: Ellsworth Hoagland
- Music by: Robert Emmett Dolan
- Production company: Paramount Pictures
- Distributed by: Paramount Pictures
- Release date: March 24, 1943
- Running time: 81 minutes
- Country: United States
- Language: English
- Box office: $1.8 million (US rentals)

Happy Go Lucky is a 1943 American Technicolor musical comedy film directed by Curtis Bernhardt and written by Walter DeLeon, Melvin Frank, John Jacoby and Norman Panama. The film stars Mary Martin, Dick Powell, Betty Hutton, Eddie Bracken and Rudy Vallée, with Mabel Paige, Eric Blore, Clem Bevans, Rita Christiani and Sir Lancelot. Produced and released by Paramount Pictures, the film is based on the story "Cupid With A Beard" by Michael Uris.

The film stars Martin as Marjory Stuart, a cigarette girl who travels to Trinidad, posing as an heiress to attract a wealthy husband. Pete Hamilton, played by Powell, is a scheming ne'er do well who decides to help out Marjory.

The film might now be best remembered for its songs. "Let's Get Lost", introduced by Mary Martin in the film, would go on to become a jazz standard. Betty Hutton's performance of the song "Murder, He Says", written by Frank Loesser and Jimmy McHugh, would go on to be one of her most famous songs.

== Plot ==
Marjory Stuart, an heiress, arrives in Trinidad from America on an ocean liner. Marjory deliberately drops her bracelet in the water, claiming that it is worth $25,000, thereby forcing the liner to pay for damages. Pete Hamilton and Wally Case are lounging on a boat when they spot Marjory drop the bracelet into the water. Pete dives and retrieves the bracelet, before returning to shore to have it valued.

Also on board the liner is singer Bubbles Hennesey, who enquires with locals on the whereabouts of her fiance, Wally Case, who ditched her before their elopement. Pete discovers that the bracelet is only worth $25. After Pete finds where Marjory is staying, he forces the truth out of her and she reveals her true identity, a goldigging cigarette girl. After Pete promises not to reveal the truth about Marjory, the two of them go boating together.

Pete points out to Marjory the yacht of his childhood friend, millionaire Alfred Monroe, and offers to help her seduce him. Later that night, Bubbles locates Wally’s home and sneaks in. After Bubbles wakes him, Wally guilt trips her into paying for his rent. Pete introduces Marjory to Alfred, but Alfred is uninterested in her.

Tessie, Wally’s voodoo priestess landlady, seeks shelter in his house as her husband has discovered her infidelity. Tessie keeps a volley of men around her through a love potion. When her husband arrives, Wally and Tessie spray him with the love potion, pacifying him. As thanks for helping her, Tessie gives the love potion to Wally.

To coax Alfred into caring for Marjory, Pete pretends to mug her to attract his attention. Alfred arrives and knocks Pete to the ground, but Alfred brushes off the incident and remains uninterested in Marjory. As Alfred walks off, Wally sprays him with the love potion. Alfred immediately proposes to Marjory, and she accepts, however Pete turns sour towards her out of jealousy.

Marjory joins a charity function, sponsored by Alfred, as a performer. During rehearsals, hotel guest Mr. Smith recognises Marjory as the cigarette girl at a restaurant he frequents in America, causing the hotel’s owner to suspect Marjory's true identity. He orders Marjory to either pay her bill promptly or get thrown out. Pete overhears and ropes Wally into his plan to raise the money through a raffle at the charity function. Wally steals Bubbles diamond brooch, making it the prize for the raffle.

Claiming the raffle is to raise money for orphans, Pete raises enough money for Marjory to pay her bill and orginizes that Bubbles wins the raffle, so she gets her brooch back. However, Alfred realises they’re swindling orphans and demands they give him the money. Pete convinces Alfred to lend him the money, but Alfred only agrees on the condition that Pete never speak to Marjory again.

Marjory receives the money from Pete and pays her bill. Realising she loves Pete and after Alfred makes arrangements to marry that night, Marjory confesses her true identity to Alfred and breaks off the engagement. Marjory returns to Pete, but he returns her affections coldly and demands she return to America on the boat the next day, causing Marjory to storm off.

Believing both Marjorie and Bubbles to be on the boat, after it departs, a dispirited Pete goes home with Wally. Upon their arrival, Bubbles sprays Wally with the love potion and hauls him to a minister. As Pete enters, he finds Marjory waiting for him and they kiss.

== Cast ==
- Mary Martin as Marjory Stuart
- Dick Powell as Pete Hamilton
- Betty Hutton as Bubbles Hennessy
- Eddie Bracken as Wally Case
- Rudy Vallée as Alfred Monroe
- Mabel Paige as Mrs. Smith
- Eric Blore as Betsman
- Clem Bevans as Mr. Smith
- Rita Christiani as Herself
- Sir Lancelot as Calypso Singer
- Dorothy Daindridge as Showgirl (uncredited)
- Lillian Randolph as Tessie (uncredited)

== Soundtrack ==
- "Sing A Tropical Song" — (Music by Jimmy McHugh & Lyrics by Frank Loesser) performed by Sir Lancelot, Dick Powell and Eddie Bracken
- "Happy Go Lucky" — (Music by Jimmy McHugh & Lyrics by Frank Loesser) performed by Mary Martin and Dick Powell
- "Let's Get Lost" — (Music by Jimmy McHugh & Lyrics by Frank Loesser) performed by Mary Martin
- "Murder, He Says" — (Music by Jimmy McHugh & Lyrics by Frank Loesser) performed by Betty Hutton
- "Ugly Woman" — (Music by Charles Herbet) performed by Sir Lancelot
- "Ta-ra-ra Boom-de-ay" — (Written by Henry J. Sayers) performed by Mary Martin
- "The Fuddy Duddy Watchmaker" — (Music by Jimmy McHugh & Lyrics by Frank Loesser) performed by Betty Hutton and Gene Cale

== Production ==
In February, 1941, Paramount bought the screen rights to the story, "Cupid With A Beard" by Michael Uris. Paramount also hired Uris to adapt his story into a screenplay. Initially, the film was meant be a vehicle for Bing Crosby, with Dorothy Lamour named as a possible cast member. The title of the film was, "Cupid With A Beard" before being changed to "Happy Go Lucky" in March, 1941.

Filming was slated to begin in February, 1942. Filming started on April 20, 1942 and continued until late June, 1942. Director Curtis Bernhardt was borrowed from Warner Brothers to direct the film.

== Release and reception ==
Happy Go Lucky premiered at the Paramount Theatre in New York City on March 24, 1943 and was opened by Les Brown and his Orchestra.

The New York Times wrote that, "If "Happy Go Lucky," now at the Paramount, is more slap-happy than lucky it probably will not interfere with simple enjoyment. For here is a technicolored charade on a level that is downright childish. It is chock-full of such paraphernalia as love potions and spray-guns to blow them through a la "Midsummer Night's Dream." It is more giddy than gay. But to its credit are a couple of twinkling dance turns by Mary Martin, a fatigued display of jitterbug temperament by Betty Hutton and some snappy sayings—old and new—given a wryly comic twist by Eddie Bracken. It all adds up to nonsense, which is no sin; and if it is less than inspired nonsense it is at least occasionally amusing. "Cute" was the word used the other night in the Paramount balcony."

Screenland magazine gave a mini review saying that Happy Go Lucky is a, "Gay spontaneous movie fun! It's one long, hearty laugh from the time Mary Martin and Betty Hutton arrive on a Caribbean isle and meet Dick Powell and Eddie Bracken. Mary's fortune hunt for Rudy Vallee and Betty's frank pursuit of reluctant Eddie lead to hilarious situations, accompanied by smart new songs, delightfully sung. The Hutton-Bracken team is sure-fire for explosive comedy."

The Motion Picture Herald ranked the film as "good", writing that: "The scene is set for another variation on an old theme, but with Betty Hutton and Eddie Bracken assisting Mary Martin and Dick Powell the treatment is a merry and musical one. In the course of Miss Martin's efforts to ensnare Mr. Vallee there is time for a sprightly group of songs by Frank Loesser and Jimmy McHugh, notably the title number, "Sing a Tropical Song" and two Betty Hutton specialties, "The Fuddy Duddy Watchmaker" and "Murder He Says." Eddie Bracken is also being pursued, by Paramount's "Blonde Bombshell," and finally succumbs to a voodoo love potion. Curtis Bernhardt, who directed the film, has managed to keep the natural exuberance of his performers within control, while Harold Wilson rates applause for the production end. An outstanding asset of the film, in addition to the five top cast names and the lively music, is the unusual beauty of its Technicolor effects. Subtle shadings in the ladies' costumes delight the eye, while more spectacular swaths of aquamarine water and emerald shores set the holiday mood."
