= Astaroth: Book of Angels Volume 1 =

Studio album by Jamie Saft Trio
- Released: May 24, 2005
- Recorded: February 2, 2005
- Genres: Avant-garde; contemporary classical music; jazz; klezmer
- Length: 55:12
- Label: Tzadik TZ 7348
- Producer: John Zorn

Book of Angels chronology
Astaroth: Book of Angels Volume 1 (2005)	Azazel: Book of Angels Volume 2 (2005)

Jamie Saft chronology
The Only Juan (2002)	Astaroth: Book of Angels Volume 1 (2005)	Music from the Film Murderball (2005)

Astaroth: Book of Angels Volume 1 is an album by the Jamie Saft Trio performing compositions from John Zorn's second Masada book, "The Book of Angels".

== Track listing ==
1. "Shalmiel" – 5:25
2. "Ygal" – 3:10
3. "Astaroth" – 6:11
4. "Ezeqeel" – 4:22
5. "Ariel" – 6:29
6. "Sturiel" – 5:06
7. "Baal-Peor" – 7:12
8. "Pursan" – 2:23
9. "Lela’hel" – 9:04
10. "Beleth" – 5:59

All compositions by John Zorn.

== Personnel ==
- Greg Cohen – bass
- Ben Perowsky – drums
- Jamie Saft – piano
