= The Ten-Year Lunch =

- Directed by: Aviva Slesin
- Written by: Peter Foges; Mary Jo Kaplan
- Produced by: Aviva Slesin
- Distributed by: Direct Cinema; PBS
- Release date: March 1987
- Running time: 56 minutes
- Country: United States
- Language: English

The Ten-Year Lunch: The Wit and Legend of the Algonquin Round Table is a 1987 American documentary film by Aviva Slesin.

== Summary ==
The film explores the Algonquin Round Table, a floating group of writers and actors during the Jazz Age in New York City, which included great names such as Dorothy Parker, Robert Benchley, George S. Kaufman, Edna Ferber, Marc Connelly, Harold Ross and Harpo Marx. It was produced and directed by Aviva Slesin and narrated by Heywood Hale Broun.

The title refers to how the members of the Round Table met over lunch at the Algonquin Hotel from 1919 until roughly 1929. The film shows how the group drifted apart once the 1920s ended, as Hollywood beckoned for some and as they grew older.

== Legacy ==
The film premiered on the PBS series American Masters on September 28, 1987. On April 11, 1988, it won the 1987 Academy Award for Best Documentary Feature.
