= Songs from the Hermetic Theatre =

Studio album by John Zorn
- Released: June 26, 2001
- Recorded: March 2001
- Genre: Avant-garde, contemporary classical music
- Length: 51:21
- Label: Tzadik TZ 7066
- Producer: John Zorn

John Zorn chronology
Madness, Love and Mysticism (2001)	Songs from the Hermetic Theatre (2001)	Filmworks X: In the Mirror of Maya Deren (2001)

Songs from the Hermetic Theatre is an album of contemporary classical music by American composer and saxophonist/multi-instrumentalist John Zorn.

== Reception ==
Professional ratings
Review scores
Source	Rating
Allmusic	4/5 stars
Pitchfork Media	8.6/10 stars

The Allmusic review by Thom Jurek awarded the album 4 stars stating "Songs From the Hermetic Theater may not be every Zorn fan's cup of gasoline, but almost none of his records are: he's written so much for so many different kinds of musical groupings it's difficult to have an affinity for them all -- but it is a thoroughly rewarding and enriching collection of new works. This set adds even more depth and dimension to an artist who has become unstoppable not only in his output, but in his vision for modern music".

Writing for Pitchfork Media, Brent S. Sirota stated "Hermetic Theatre is the no-hassle, easy-to-follow, four-step program for achieving that tenuous, bi-polar, paranoid, quasi-hallucinatory handle on living... The antidote to dying miserably".

== Track listing ==
All compositions by John Zorn

1. "American Magus" - 14:10
2. "In the Very Eye of Night" - 11:21
3. "The Nerve Key" - 9:36
4. "BeuysBlock" - 16:14

== Personnel ==
- Jennifer Choi - violin
- John Zorn - electronic and computer music, bass, water, drum, flute, glass bowl, metal pipes, wax paper, mud, staple gun
