= Sovlanut =

Studio album by Jamie Saft
- Released: July 25, 2000
- Recorded: November 1999 – January 2000 , Good & Evil Studios, Brooklyn
- Genre: Jazz
- Length: 48:01
- Label: Tzadik TZ 7142
- Producer: Chris Kelly & Jamie Saft

Jamie Saft chronology
Ragged Jack (1996)	Sovlanut (2000)	Breadcrumb Sins (2002)

Sovlanut is an album by Jamie Saft which was released on the Tzadik label in 2000.

== Reception ==
Professional ratings
Review scores
Source	Rating
Allmusic	4/5 stars

In his review for Allmusic, Tom Benton notes that "Despite the presence of ubiquitous downtowners Chris Speed and Jim Black, Sovlanut is not exactly a grand avant-jazz masterpiece, but instead a challenging expedition into live electronica, as Jewish and Arabic themes are arranged over a dense backdrop of dub and drum'n'bass. Though there certainly is bountiful improvising to be had, Sovlanut seems more focused on exploring similar atmospheric territory as the club music by which it was inspired".

== Track listing ==
All compositions by Jamie Saft

1. "Kasha Dub" – 6:54
2. "Sovlanut" – 12:52
3. "Mach / Hey" – 15:06
4. "Midwood Cowboy" – 3:43
5. "Tefachim" – 11:53
6. "Fresser Dub" – 2:55

== Personnel ==
- Jamie Saft – piano, Hammond organ, synthesizer, guitar, bass, saz, percussion
- Chris Speed – clarinet
- Jonathan Maron – bass
- Jim Black, Chris Kelly (tracks 1 & 6) – drums, percussion
- Rick Quinones – vocals (tracks 1 & 6)
