= Beat the Donkey =

Studio album by Cyro Baptista
- Released: October 22, 2002
- Recorded: 2002
- Genre: World music
- Length: 47:54
- Labels: Tzadik; 7608
- Producers: Cyro Baptista & Eleonora Alberto

Cyro Baptista chronology
Supergenerous (2000)	Beat the Donkey (2002)	Love the Donkey (2005)

Beat the Donkey is an album by percussionist Cyro Baptista, which marked the debut of his rotating percussion and dance ensemble that would become known as Beat the Donkey, which was released on the Tzadik label in 2002.

== Reception ==
Professional ratings
Review scores
Source	Rating
Allmusic	3.5/5 stars

Michael G. Nastos of Allmusic said "There is no real core band, but rather a Gypsy circus loose association with Baptista clearly the madcap ringleader. Brazilian music can be the center of Beat the Donkey, but also Balkan sounds, nomadic music, rock and funk, and a festive attitude that surely appeals to summertime outdoor merrymaking".

== Track listing ==
All compositions by Cyro Baptista except as indicated

1. "Caranguejo Estrela Brilhante" (Cyro Baptista, Erasto Vasconcelos) - 4:44
2. "Sapo and the Prince" - 2:29
3. "Cyrandeiro" - 4:23
4. "Sweet Cuica" - 2:15
5. "O Canto da Ema" - 3:46
6. "Parar de Fumar" - 4:19
7. "Rio de Jakarta" - 5:08
8. "Tapping the Stars" - 2:49
9. "Anastacia" - 2:38
10. "Mr. Bugaloo" - 3:23
11. "Ama" - 3:27
12. "Funk I" [video] - 8:33

== Personnel ==
- Cyro Baptista - percussion, vocals
- Amir Ziv, Cabello Rolim, Kim Tamango, Kristina Kanders, Max Pollak, Sabina Ciari, Tim Keiper, Tisza Coelho, Tomer Tzur, Viva de Concini, Ze Mauricio - percussion, vocals, Lisette Santiago-vocals and percussion
- Erik Friedlander - cello (tracks 1 & 9)
- Jamie Saft (track 1), Peter Scherer (track 9) - synthesizer
- Francisco Centeno (track 2), Nilson Matta (track 11) - bass
- Kevin Breit (track 10), Romero Lubambo (tracks 2 & 11), Marc Ribot (tracks 3 & 5) - guitar
- Vanessa Saft (track 11), Luciana Souza (track 2) - vocals
- Sergio Brandao - bass, guitar, vocals (tracks 3–6)
- Anat Cohen - clarinet, vocals (track 6)
- Jorge Alabe - percussion (tracks 9 & 10)
- Toninho Ferragutti - accordion (track 10)
- John Zorn - alto saxophone (track 10)
