= A Bag of Shells =

Soundtrack album by Jamie Saft
- Released: 2010
- Recorded: 2005–2007
- Genre: Soundtrack
- Length: 49:36
- Label: Tzadik TZ 7520
- Producer: Jamie Saft

Jamie Saft chronology
Black Shabbis (2009)	A Bag of Shells (2010)	Borscht Belt Studies (2011)

A Bag of Shells is an album of music written for film by Jamie Saft which was released on the Tzadik label in 2010. It features the music that Saft wrote and recorded for the documentaries Murderball (2005) and God Grew Tired of Us (2006), Dear Talula (2007) and Brooklyn Exile (2007).

== Reception ==
Professional ratings
Review scores
Source	Rating
Allmusic	3.5/5 stars

In his review for Allmusic, Thom Jurek notes that:

A Bag of Shells looks at another side of Saft's career, his soundtrack work. Beginning in 2005, Saft began scoring films. Here are excerpts of four scores in an eclectic arrangement not sequenced according to film origin, but programmed aesthetically... It all displays Saft's originality, diversity, and exemplary musicianship. A Bag of Shells is an album that asks as many questions as the films it illustrates do, much to the listener's delight.

— Jurke, Thom. Jamie Saft – A Bag of Shells > Review at AllMusic. Retrieved 27 November 2013.

== Track listing ==
All compositions by Jamie Saft

1. "Murderball" – 1:22
2. "My Biggest Fear" – 4:27
3. "Circle C" – 1:50
4. "Morning Music" – 7:30
5. "Social Security" – 0:50
6. "Joe's Rush" – 2:22
7. "Ninann" – 1:15
8. "Right Again" – 5:16
9. "Piano for the Masses" – 1:10
10. "Parliament" – 3:26
11. "Keith Goes Home" – 4:03
12. "Job Corps" – 1:27
13. "Dezert Blues" – 4:25
14. "Hyphen's Air" – 2:57
15. "Hermans" – 4:52
16. "Brooklyn Exile (Theme)" – 2:32
- Tracks 1, 6, 11 & 14 from Murderball (2005), tracks 5, 10 & 12 from God Grew Tired of Us (2006), tracks 2–4, 7–9, 13 & 15 from Dear Talula (2007) and track 16 from Brooklyn Exile (2007).

== Personnel ==
- Jamie Saft – piano (tracks 3, 9, 13, 15 & 16), Fender Rhodes (tracks 4, 6 & 8), Mellotron (tracks 6 & 9), organ (tracks 6, 10 & 13), Wurlitzer (track 11), synthesizer (tracks 2 & 11), guitar (tracks 1, 2, 4, 7, 8, 11 & 13), bass guitar (tracks 1, 2, 4, 6–8, 10 & 13), drums (track 8), percussion (tracks 2, 4, 7 & 14), programming (track 14)
- Bill McHenry – tenor saxophone (track 15)
- Erik Friedlander – cello (track 6)
- Yacouba Sissoko – kora (track 10)
- Shanir Ezra Blumenkranz – oud (tracks 5 & 10)
- Vin Cin – bass (track 16)
- Bobby Previte (tracks 4 & 13), Dmitriy Shnaydman (track 1 & 16) – drums
- Cyro Baptista – percussion (tracks 5 & 10)
