= Borscht Belt Studies =

Studio album by Jamie Saft
- Released: August 30, 2011
- Recorded: 2010, New York
- Genre: Jazz
- Length: 52:43
- Label: Tzadik TZ 8164
- Producer: Jamie Saft

Jamie Saft chronology
A Bag of Shells (2010)	Borscht Belt Studies (2011)	Fight Against Babylon (2011)

Borscht Belt Studies is an album by Jamie Saft which was released on the Tzadik label in 2009.

== Reception ==
Professional ratings
Review scores
Source	Rating
Allmusic	4/5 stars

In his review for Allmusic, Thom Jurek notes that "Saft divides the album into musical sections that alternate by cut. Some compositions are based on blues, jazz, and Yiddish melodies, some in modern composition and vanguard classical music, and the closing track in reggae!... It's a mysterious, labyrinthine piece that is a stunner in the end -- it reflects the rest of Borscht Belt Studies beautifully".

== Track listing ==
All compositions by Jamie Saft

1. "Issachar" - 5:15
2. "Hellenville" - 3:52
3. "Darkest Arts" - 3:30
4. "Pinkus" - 5:13
5. "The Pines" - 3:29
6. "Darash" - 4:13
7. "Solomon County" - 6:54
8. "Jews for Joseph (Maneri)" - 7:01
9. "Kutshers" - 4:34
10. "Azulai" - 3:44
11. "New Zion" - 4:58

== Personnel ==
- Jamie Saft - piano, Fender Rhodes
- Ben Goldberg - clarinet (tracks 1, 3, 4, 6, 8 & 10)
- Larry Grenadier - bass (track 11)
- Craig Santiago - drums (track 11)
