= Kristina Kanders =

German visual artist and musician (born 1962)

Kristina Kanders (born 1962 in Cologne) is a German visual artist and musician.

== Background ==
Kristina Kanders is a daughter of German soprano Agnes Giebel. During her school years she concentrated on painting. At the age of 20, she began playing drums. In 1987 she moved to New York City to study (1992- Bachelor of Fine Arts Degree, New School University, 1997- Master of Arts Degree, Queens College). She studied among others with Ron Carter, Jimmy Heath, Kenwood Dennard, Jojo Mayer, Bernard Purdie, Kenny Werner and Jim Hall. From 1994 to 2005 Kanders taught at New School University.

In her New York years 1987 – 2005 Kanders performed in numerous concerts, festivals and radio broadcasts in the US and Europe, among others with Cyro Baptista's Beat the Donkey, her own group Sambanditos, Kit McClure Big Band, Joe McGinty, Huevos Rancheiros, Boo Trundle, Maria Excommunikata.

In 2005, Kanders returned to Cologne and produced her own music then from 2006–2009, she performed frequently on drums with Frank Köllges' Missiles Orchestra. She released two solo albums "For All People" (2008) and "Say Something" (2010) and several original music videos on YouTube.

Since 2012, the emphasis of her work has shifted entirely to visual arts.

== Exhibitions and festivals ==
(C = catalog)
1988 Pori Jazz Festival with Sambanditos
1992 – 2002 Concerts with Sambanditos/NYC at Madison Square Garden, MOMA, United Nations, Lincoln Center and many more
1995 Modern Drummer Festival with Kenwood Dennard
1998 – 2002 Festivals with Cyro Baptista's Beat the Donkey, among others at Big Bang Percussion Festival in Belgium and Holland, Guimaraes Jazz Festival, Guggenheim Museum, NY Stock Exchange and many more
2000 CYRO BAPTISTA BEAT THE DONKEY – Willisau Jazz Archive Willisau Jazz Festival with Cyro Baptista's Beat the Donkey
2009 The Dome 51, Lanxess Arena Cologne, playing drums for Emiliana Torrini
2015 Frauenmuseum Bonn, 25. Art Fair, C
2016 Frauenmuseum Bonn, Work and Women, annual exhibition, C
2017 Die Künstler – NordArt NordArt Büdelsdorf, C
2018 Große Kunstausstellung NRW Düsseldorf Die Große Kunstausstellung NRW, C

== Discography ==
- Film music for "Global Vulva", a film by artist Myriam Thyes, 2009, Düsseldorf
- Kristina Kanders, Say Something (Bernd Gast Music, 2010), Cologne
- Kristina Kanders, For All People (Bernd Gast Music, 2008), Cologne
- Brian Woodbury – Variety Orchestra Brian Woodbury, "Variety Orchestra" (Some Phil Records, RER Megacorp, 2004), New York
- Cyro Baptista – Beat The Donkey Cyro Baptista, "Beat the Donkey" (Tzadik Records, 2002)], New York
- David Watson – Skirl David Watson "Skirl" (Avant Records, 1999,) with "Beat the Donkey", New York
- Filmmusic with the "Custard Kings" for the film "The Golden Ram" by Alain Cloarec, 1996, New York
- Boo Trundle, "Possible Bodies" (Big Deal Records, 1996), New York
- Baby Steps Joe McGinty, "Baby Steps" (Continuum Records, 1996), New York
- David McLary and Huevos Rancheros David McLary's "Huevos Rancheros" (Three Ring Records, 1996), New York
