= Max Pollak =

Austrian dancer (born 1970)

- Max Pollak, photo by Lois Greenfield
- Born: 1 September 1970 (age 56); Vienna, Austria
- Occupations: Choreographer, dancer, musician
- Website: www.rumbatap.com

Max Pollak (born 1 September 1970) is percussive dancer and World Music expert. He was born in Vienna, Austria and became known for his work in percussive dance, World Music, tap dance, and choreography. He created "RumbaTap", which merged American Rhythm Tap with Afro-Cuban music and dance. He is the only non-Cuban member of the Afro-Cuban Rumba and folklore ensemble Los Muñequitos de Matanzas. For the 19th and early 20th centurygraphic artist, Max Pollak.

== Early life ==
Max was born in Vienna, Austria on 1 September 1970. He has started tapping when, at the age of five, he watched Fred Astaire "finesse his way across the screen of the family television set." Tap lessons, however, were not available; in Austria, there was only classical ballet for a youth hungry to learn to dance.

"I however did some self-teaching. My parents bought me some shoes in a dance wear store. I also caught a little bit of an instructional TV show that was on just for a few months. So I would watch regularly whatever came on, whether it was Gene Kelly or Fred Astaire, and I would end up imitating whatever I saw on TV."

At eleven, he started taking official dance lessons, and at 14, he learned to play the drums and percussion. He was first exposed to the African American style of rhythm tap when he was 17 years old and met 71-year-old Carnell Lyons. Lyons, a Kansas City-born childhood friend of Charlie Parker, became Pollak's mentor.

=== Education ===
Pollak studied theater at Theater an der Wien Musical Theater School in Vienna, Austria from 1988–1990 and moved to New York in 1991 at the invitation of Heather Cornell, artistic director of the Bebop tap quartet Manhattan Tap. In the United States, he studied Jazz at The New School, graduating in May 1995. Teachers included the jazz drummers Charlie Persip and Vernell Fournier, and the pianists Ted Rosenthal, Lee Musiker, and Phil Markovitz (music theory, arrangement). To develop his versatility as a dancer, Pollak studied ballet (Jan Miller), jazz dance (Daniel Tinazzi, Phil Black), theater dance (Robert Tucker, Chris Chadman), and diverse tap styles with recognized masters (Savion Glover, Bob Audy, Lesley Lockery, Phil Black).

== Career ==
=== Musical theatre ===
Pollak began his professional career performing in musical theater in Europe. Highlights include Deutschland Lied (1989) at Sartory Theater in Köln, directed by Jürgen Flimm and choreographed by Michael Shawn. He also appeared with the original company of Eric Woolfson's musical Freudiana at Theatre an der Wien. After moving to the United States in 1991, he appeared Off Broadway in the Wings Theater production of The Nutcracker in the Land of Nuts (1991); summer stock—at Surflight Theater, NJ (1992) in Brigadoon, Chicago, Meet Me in St. Louis, and A Chorus Line; and regionally at the Downtown Cabaret Theater, Bridgeport, CT in The All Night Strut! (1995).

=== Manhattan Tap, Feet 2 the Beat, Beat the Donkey and Urban Tap ===
Pollak also used the move to New York to launch his career with a variety of Tap-based dance troupes. These included "Manhattan Tap", "Feet 2 the Beat", "Beat the Donkey", and "Urban Tap". He co-hosted a weekly tap jam session at the East Village club Deanna's, together with his close friends Tamango of Urban Tap, Roxane Butterfly of Worldbeats, and saxophonist/composer Paul Carlon. He also appeared regularly at New York City jazz club La Cave with Dr. Jimmy Slyde, Dr. Buster Brown, Chuck Green, and Lon Chaney. Performances included a collaboration at Lincoln Center with jazz bass legend Ray Brown. In 2004, he was featured on Cyro Baptista's Beat the Donkey Beat.

=== RumbaTap ===
The ideas behind RumbaTap began when Max took a class with Afro-Latin jazz icon Bobby Sanabria at the New School: "It changed my life," Pollak recalls. "We played in a big band, and I had to play different instruments and learn as much as I possibly could." The learning process included watching videos of Afro-Cuban traditional music, including performances by legends Los Muñequitos de Matanzas. "That really struck a chord. I told Bobby I was a tap dancer and that I wanted to tap dance to this music. He asked me if I wanted to tap dance to Cuban music, or tap dance Cuban music. Then he reached for the claves,"—the rhythmic base of Afro-Cuban music—"and said, ‘You have to play claves while you dance;’" a feat that sounds easier on paper than in reality.

Pollak practiced doing just that, drawing on his drummer's ability to walk and chew gum at the same time. Eventually he mastered the approach and took it to the stage at the Nuyorican Poets Café. There, he had another life-changing encounter: He met Los Muñequitos de Matanzas and one of their finest rumba dancers, Barbaro Ramos, asked Pollak to teach him to tap.

"We met in a studio, and I brought along an old pair of my tap shoes. I said 'This is how you play cascara on the side of the drum. This is how you do it with your feet.' He was immediately able to reproduce what I was doing," Pollak reflects. "I thought, 'If this guy can learn the basic gist of tap dancing so fast, this is worth my energy.' I taught him for a couple of hours, and then told him 'Keep the shoes.'" A couple months later they met up in New York and Ramos performed a "mindblowing" tap solo on stage.

RumbaTap, the music/dance ensemble created and named after Pollak's unique body percussion/tap concept, premiered in 1999. It was hailed as "... a stylistically satisfying blend of polyrhythms and percussive landscapes" and "infectiously charming ..." It was officially launched at a show in 1999 at El Taller Latino Americano, featuring Bobby Sanabria, Barbaro Ramos, and Paul Carlon's Latin jazz quartet Grupo Los Santos. The international cast of musicians and dancers now consists of marimba, a saxophone trio, vocalists and a percussion section led by six body-drumming tap dancers. Since 2010 RumbaTap also performs as an a cappella vocal ensemble.

RumbaTap has since toured throughout Europe, Japan, Cuba, Brazil, Turkey, Canada and the United States, in 2008 performing to a capacity crowd at New York City's Central Park Summer Stage.

=== Cuba ===
In 2001, Pollak received a grant from Arts International to help establish Cuba's first tap festival in Havana. Traveling with Pollak were Paul Carlon's quartet of virtuosic jazz musicians who performed with Cuban jazz musicians led by Chucho Valdez.

=== Classical music ===
In 2011, he began working to make European and South American classical music more accessible by playing with classical ensembles in prestigious venues such as Vienna's Konzerthaus and Musikverein and Havana's Teatro Nacional and Teatro Amadeo Roldan. He has since performed with members of both the Vienna Philharmonic and New York Philharmonic, and as a soloist in the Morton Gould Tap Dance Concerto with the Duluth Superior, East Texas and Plano Symphony Orchestras.

Of Pollak's performance at a 2013 concert in Orford, Canada, Steve Bergeron of Québec La Tribune wrote:

"The breathtaking Rumba Tap dancer Max Pollak, and Les Violons du Roy directed by Jean-François Rivest, electrified the 62nd Festival Orford ‘s opening concert on Saturday night at the Salle Gilles Lefebvre." (The Tchaïkovski Experience: Orford Festival, 13 May 2013)

=== Teaching ===
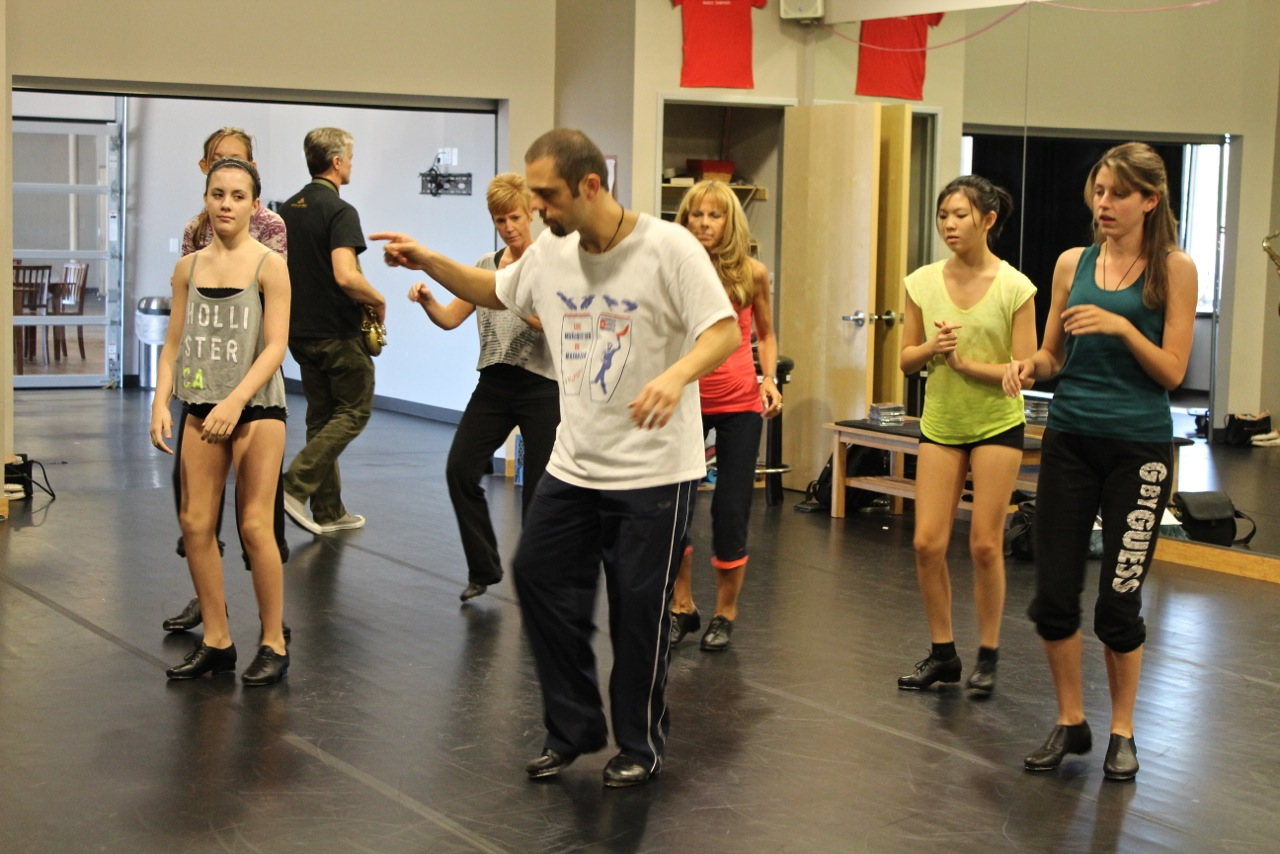
Teaching a class in percusive dance at Alice Cooper's The Rock at 32nd Street

- University of Minnesota Dance: Visiting Artist and Scholar Endowment in Dance, 2008
- Sarah Lawrence College: Faculty
- The Rock at 32nd Street, in Phoenix, AZ: Free class and Concert—with Grupo Los Santos, 5 October 2013
- American Tap Dance Foundation/Tap City (New York City Tap Festival): artist in residence, rhythm tap training and enrichment for advanced professional tap dancers—ongoing 2001–present

== As an author ==
- "Global Tap: Shuffle off to Buffalo, Bosnia, and Beyond", Dance Magazine, May 2007
- "The Real Jimmy Slyde", International Tap Association Newsletter 8, May–June 1997

== Personal life ==
In 1996, Pollak married Broadway actress Mary Illes. In 2002, their daughter Caroline was born.

== Awards and nominations ==
- 2016 Flo-Bert Award winner
- 2011 Hoofer Award winner
- 2011 Bessie Award nominee
- 2010 Individual Artist Grantee of the Northern Manhattan Arts Alliance
- 2008 Fellow in Choreography from the New York Foundation of the Arts
- 2007 Dance Magazine''s "25 to Watch"

== List of concerts ==
=== Stage performances ===
==== New York ====
- Lincoln Center – Jazz at Lincoln Center, Alice Tully Hall, Meet The Artist

- RumbaTap, Manhattan Tap, Feet 2 The Beat, Beat The Donkey (1995–2008)
- Soloist w/ Cyro Baptista; Ray Brown, Danilo Perez, John DiMartino, Yosvany Terry, Dafnis Prieto, Bobby Sanabria's Quarteto Aché

- Central Park Summer Stage

- RumbaTap (2008)
- Beat The Donkey (2000)

- Joyce Theater

- RumbaTap (2005) Urban Tap (2002)

- Joyce Soho

- RumbaTap (2007, 2006)

- Doris Duke Theater

- RumbaTap (2001–2007) Dejelaba Groove (2005) Global Jam (2004);
- Tap City (2001–2007)

- New Victory Theater
- Urban Tap (2001)
- Public Theater: Global Fest w/ Roxane Butterfly (2006)
- Symphony Space
- RumbaTap (2008, 2007) Jazz Nativity in the role of the Third King usually played by Jimmy Slyde w/ Paquito D'Rivera, Slide Hampton, Dave Valentin (2005)
- Town Hall
- Barry Harris Spring Concert w/ Jimmy Slyde (2002) Super Son Cubano w/ Jose Fajardo, J.P. Torres (1999) Manhattan Tap (1992)
- Tribeca Arts Center
- Lost Jazz Shrines featuring Phil Woods, Roxane Butterfly (2008)
- 92nd Street Y
- Kathak Ensemble (2006)
- La Mama
