= Aviva Slesin =

Lithuanian director

Aviva Slesin is a documentary film-maker.

Slesin was awarded the Academy Award for Best Feature Documentary for her film The Ten Year Lunch: The Wit and Legend of the Algonquin Round Table in 1987. She is member of the Directors Guild of America and The Academy of Motion Picture Arts and Sciences. Slesin has been a MacDowell Fellow and has had a retrospective of her work shown at the Sundance Film Festival She is a member of the faculty at NYU’s Tisch School of the Arts. Slesin is also a painter.

== Career ==
=== Documentaries ===
Slesin's career was launched in 1975 as a freelance film editor with The Other Half of the Sky: A China Memoir, produced by Shirley MacLaine and nominated that year for an Academy Award for Best Feature Documentary. Next, she edited Making Television Dance about choreographer Twyla Tharp, followed in 1977 by The Rutles, a Beatles satire directed by Monty Python's Eric Idle.

In 1980, Slesin made the transition to independent Producer/Director with nine comedy shorts for the original Saturday Night Live. In 1986, she directed and edited Directed by William Wyler, a biography of the late Hollywood director.

In 1987, Slesin won an Academy Award for Best Feature Documentary for her film The Ten Year Lunch: The Wit and Legend of the Algonquin Round Table. Then, 1990 marked a shift to dramatic films when Slesin directed and executive produced Stood Up! an ABC Afterschool Special. Then Slesin produced and directed Voices in Celebration, a documentary for the National Gallery's fiftieth anniversary. And in 1993 and 1994, she produced and directed the documentary, Hot on the Trail: Sex, Love and Romance in the Old West for TBS.

During 1995 to 1998, Slesin produced and directed a series of short segments for The Rosie O'Donnell Show, Kids Talk, John Hockenberry's Edgewise, HBO’s Real Sex, and Religion & Ethics Newsweekly.

In 2003, Slesin produced, directed, and narrated Secret Lives: Hidden Children and Their Rescuers During WWII, which was nominated for two Emmys and won a Christopher Award.

== Films ==
- Directed by William Wyler (1986)
- The Ten Year Lunch: The Wit and Legend of the Algonquin Round Table (1987)
- Stood Up (1990)
- Voices in Celebration (1980)
- Hot on The Trial: Sex, Love and Romance in the Old West (1993)
- Secret Lives: Hidden Children and Their Rescuers During WWII (2003)

== Awards ==
- Academy Award (Oscar)
- Inspirational Film Award, Hamptons International Film Festival
- Lillian Gish Award, Los Angeles Women in Film Festival
- Christopher Award

== See also ==
- Documentary film
