= Say Amen =

- David Deri with his parents
- Directed by: David Deri
- Release date: 2005
- Running time: 65 minutes
- Country: Israel
- Language: Hebrew

Say Amen (2005) is a personal documentary film by David Deri, an Orthodox Jew, who reveals his homosexuality to his parents and siblings. The documentary is named one of the best five documentaries of the year 2005 by Israeli Film Academy and appeared in many film festivals, including HOTDOCS-Toronto, the Leeds International Film Festival, the Cork Film Festival, and Inside Out Film and Video Festival.

== Summary ==
David is the youngest of ten siblings in a close-knit Moroccan-Israeli family. While the other nine have all extended the family tree by marrying and having children, David, at twenty-nine, still hasn't brought home a girlfriend, which inspires his family's constant nagging. The confessional film follows David as he takes small steps, gathering courage, and hoping to receive acceptance from his family.

Throughout the film the importance of marriage is made clear. In one scene David's mother is shown lighting candles as she prays for her children in a hushed tone: "save them from bombing accidents; let them all marry and have children."

Set in Tel Aviv, Say Amen explores the varying ideologies regarding homosexuality that are present in Israel today. Many religions interpret that the book of Leviticus from the Bible as describing homosexuality as an "abomination" that is punishable by death, although this has been debated for quite some time. Today there is a growing sympathy within Judaism towards homosexuals, spurred by some people's beliefs that homosexuality is not a chosen act of sin. Despite these progressive attitudes, Orthodox Judaism generally prohibits homosexual conduct and views it with condescension and disgust.

David is brave enough to share his struggles, but, for the most part, he's still too shy to step out from behind the camera. His family is irritated by his constant filming, but it works to the documentary's advantage. By turning the lens away from himself, David completely avoids self-indulgent emotionality, maintaining a sense of objectivity. This technique also allows the viewer to see the world through his eyes. The frustrated looks, the sad sighs, and the lectures are all addressed to the camera, making it easy for the viewer to imagine how David must feel.

Say Amen impresses the importance of family. In between their serious conversations, the documentary captures ordinary moments the Deri family spends together. The entire Dari extended family gathers to celebrate a grandchild's birthday, David dances with his mother in the kitchen, and little kids climb all over the couch where their mother is sitting and yawning. The comfort is apparent, making David's isolating secret all the more painful.

== See also ==
- Homophobia
- Homosexuality and Judaism

=== Documentaries featuring Orthodox Jews and LGBT themes ===
- Trembling Before G-d
- Keep Not Silent
- Paper Dolls
