= Jamie Saft =

American keyboardist and composer

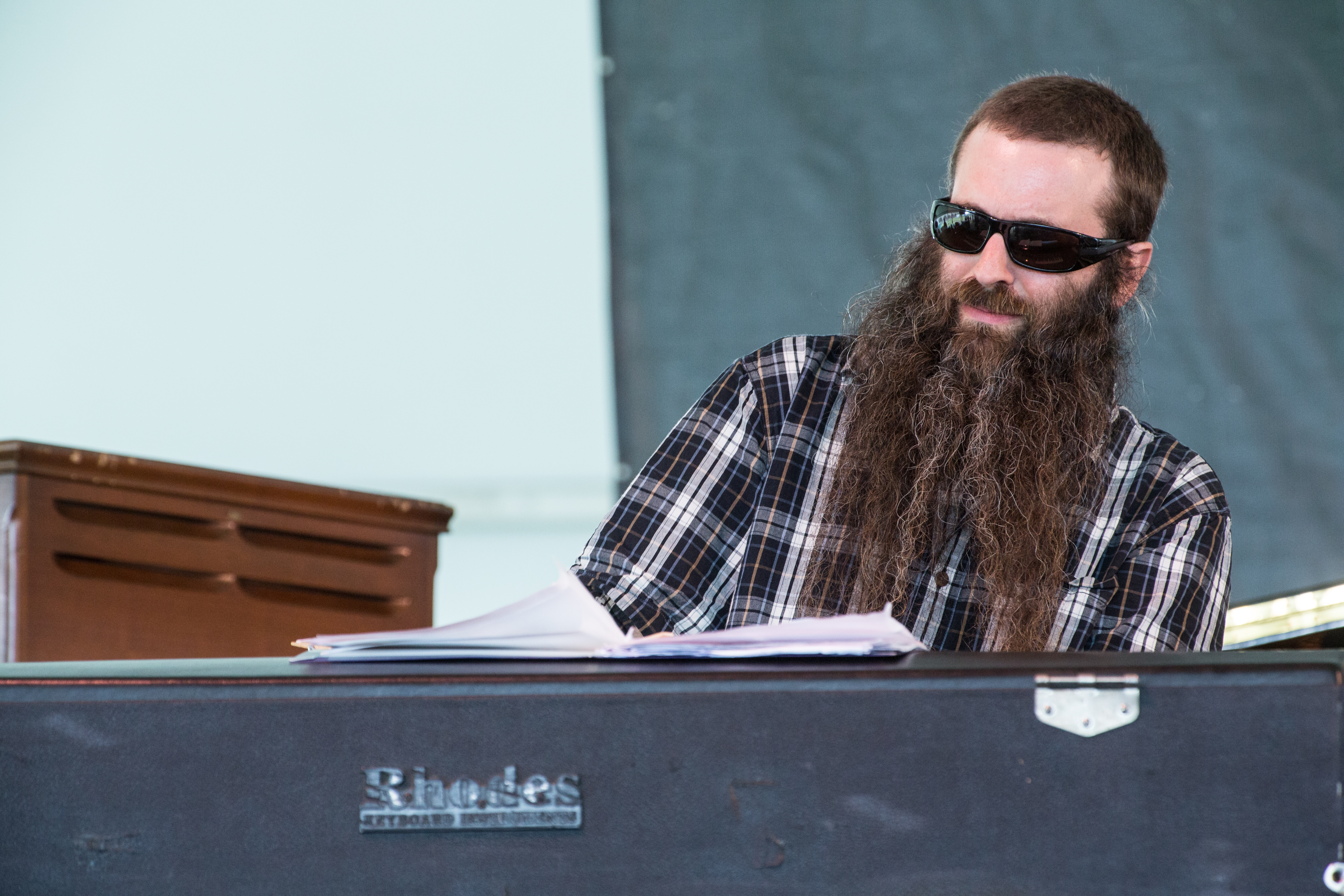
- Saft at the Newport Jazz Festival, 2014

Background information
- Born: 1971 (age 54–55)
- Genres: Rock, jazz
- Occupations: Musician, composer
- Instruments: Keyboards, organ
- Labels: Avant, Tzadik, Veal
- Website: Official website

Jamie Saft (born 1971 in New York City) is an American keyboardist and multi-instrumentalist and composer. He was raised a Conservative Jew, and studied at Tufts University and the New England Conservatory of Music.

Saft moved from Brooklyn to the Hudson Valley around 2007, and lived near Roswell Rudd. The two often played together, and Rudd passed on knowledge of some of his own music and that of Herbie Nichols.

He has performed and recorded with an eclectic variety of artists including John Zorn, Wadada Leo Smith, Iggy Pop, Steve Swallow, Bobby Previte, and Marc Ribot. He has also written several original film scores including Murderball and God Grew Tired of Us; selections from these were released by Tzadik Records as A Bag of Shells. The same label has released several of Saft's recordings. Jamie has three daughters.

== Discography ==
- Ragged Jack with Cuong Vu (Avant, 1996)
- Sovlanut (Tzadik, 2000)
- Breadcrumb Sins (Tzadik, 2002)
- Merzdub (Caminante, 2006)
- Trouble: The Jamie Saft Trio Plays Bob Dylan (Tzadik, 2006)
- Black Shabbis (Tzadik, 2009)
- A Bag of Shells (Tzadik, 2010)
- Borscht Belt Studies (Tzadik, 2011)
- Fight Against Babylon with New Zion Trio (Veal, 2011)
- Chaliwa with New Zion Trio (Veal, 2013)
- The New Standard (RareNoise, 2014)
- Sunshine Seas with New Zion Trio (RareNoise, 2016)
- Loneliness Road (RareNoise, 2017)
- Blue Dream (RareNoise, 2018)
- Solo a Genova (RareNoise, 2018)
- You Don't Know the Life (RareNoise, 2019)
- Hidden Corners (RareNoise, 2019)

=== As sideman ===
With Jerry Granelli

- Enter, A Dragon (Songlines, 1998)
- Crowd Theory (Songlines, 1999)
- Music Has Its Way with Me (Perimeter, 1999)
- El oh el ay (Love Slave, 2001)
- The Only Juan (Love Slave, 2001)
- Gigantic (Love Slave, 2003)
- The Jerry Granelli Trio Plays Vince Guaraldi & Mose Allison (RareNoise, 2020)

With Bobby Previte

- Too Close to the Pole (Enja, 1996)
- My Man in Sydney (Enja, 1997)
- Dangerous Rip (Enja, 1998)
- The 23 Constellations of Joan Miro (Tzadik, 2001)
- The Coalition of the Willing (P-Vine, 2006)
- Mass (RareNoise, 2016)
- Music from the Early 21st Century (RareNoise, 2020)

With John Zorn

- Taboo & Exile (Tzadik, 1999)
- Filmworks IX: Trembling Before G-d (Tzadik, 2000)
- The Gift (Tzadik, 2001)
- Filmworks X: In the Mirror of Maya Deren (Tzadik, 2001)
- Cobra: John Zorn's Game Pieces Volume 2 (Tzadik, 2002)
- Filmworks XI: Secret Lives (Tzadik, 2002)
- Filmworks XII: Three Documentaries (Tzadik 2002)
- IAO (Tzadik, 2002)
- Voices in the Wilderness (Tzadik, 2003)
- The Unknown Masada (Tzadik, 2003)
- 50th Birthday Celebration Volume 4 (Tzadik, 2004)
- Astaroth: Book of Angels Volume 1 (Tzadik, 2005)
- Filmworks XVI: Workingman's Death (Tzadik, 2005)
- Electric Masada: At the Mountains of Madness (Tzadik, 2005)
- The Dreamers (Tzadik, 2008)
- O'o (Tzadik, 2009)
- Ipos: Book of Angels Volume 14 (Tzadik, 2010)
- Baal: Book of Angels Volume 15 (Tzadik, 2010)
- A Dreamers Christmas (Tzadik, 2011)
- Pellucidar: A Dreamers Fantabula (Tzadik, 2015)
- Six Litanies for Heliogabalus (Tzadik, 2007)
- The Big Gundown (Tzadik, 2000)

With others

- Marshall Allen, Ceremonial Healing (RareNoise, 2019)
- Bad Brains, Build a Nation (Oscilloscope/Megaforce, 2007)
- Cyro Baptista, Beat the Donkey (Tzadik, 2002)
- Cyro Baptista, Love the Donkey (Tzadik, 2005)
- Jane Ira Bloom, Like Silver, Like Song (ArtistShare, 2005)
- Oren Bloedow & Jennifer Charles, La Mar Enfortuna (Tzadik, 2001)
- Sasha Dobson, Aquarius (Creek Valley, 2013)
- Dave Douglas, Freak In (Bluebird, 2002)
- Dave Douglas, Keystone (Greenleaf Music, 2005)
- Peter Epstein, Staring at the Sun (MA, 1997)
- Gaudi, Magnetic (RareNoise, 2017)
- Chuck Hammer, Blind On Blind (AVA, 2016)
- Hasidic New Wave, From the Belly of Abraham (Knitting Factory, 2001)
- Frank London, Scientist at Work (Tzadik, 2002)
- Mat Maneri, Pentagon (Thirsty Ear, 2005)
- Joe McPhee, Ticonderoga (Clean Feed, 2015)
- Youn Sun Nah, She Moves On (ACT, 2017)
- Orange Then Blue, Hold the Elevator (GM, 1999)
- Ruper Ordorika, Memoriaren Mapan (Elkar, 2006)
- Ruper Ordorika, Guria Ostatuan (Elkar, 2016)
- Roswell Rudd, Strength & Power (RareNoise, 2016)
- Wadada Leo Smith, Lake Biwa (Tzadik, 2004)
- Wadada Leo Smith, Red Hill (RareNoise, 2014)
- Chris Speed, Iffy (Knitting Factory, 2000)
- Cuong Vu, Bound (OmniTone, 2000)
