= Wolfgang Lehner =

German computer scientist (born 1969)

Wolfgang Martin Josef Lehner
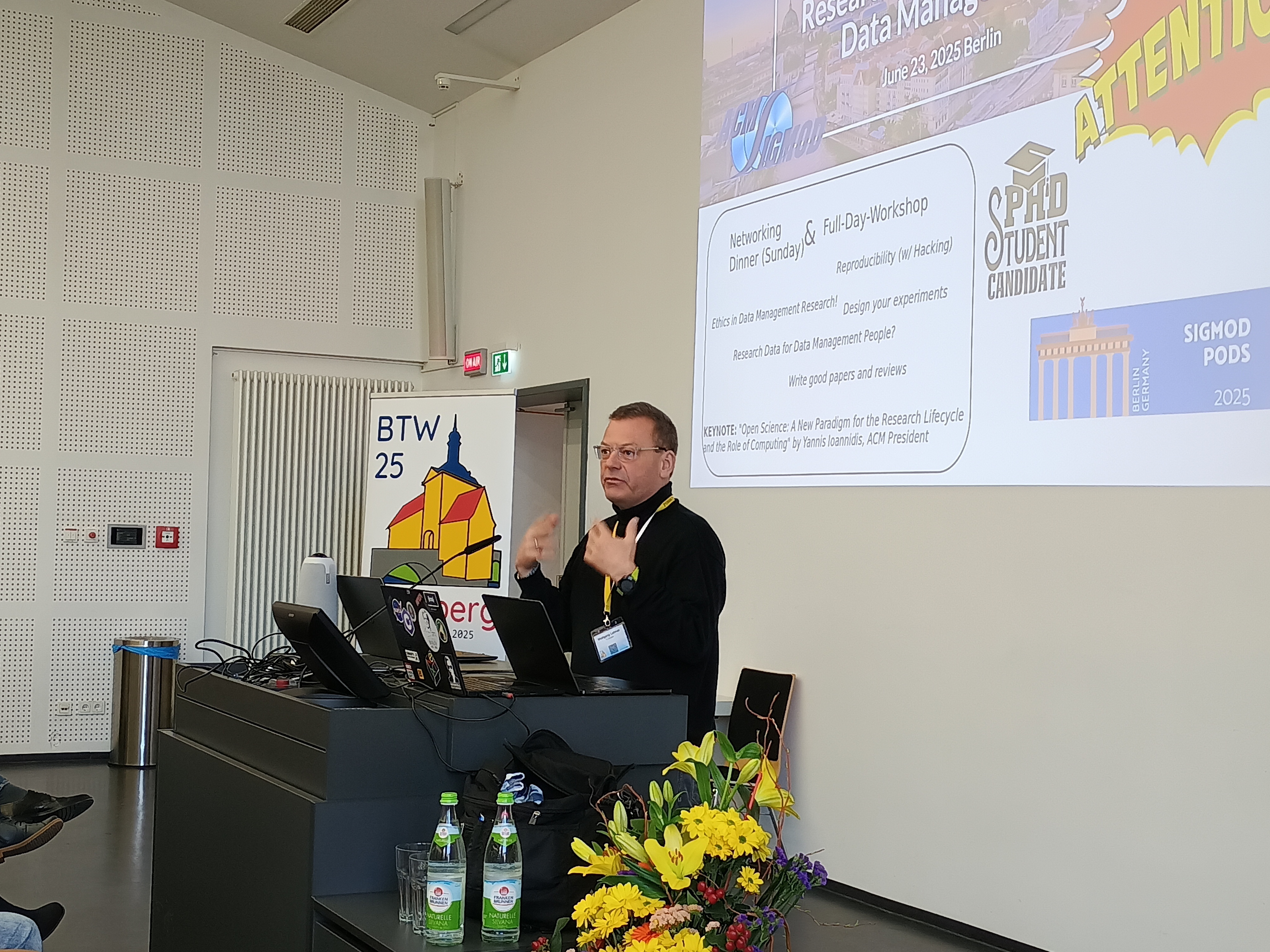
- Lehner at BTW 2025
- Born: 1969 (age 56–57)
- Citizenship: German
- Education: University of Erlangen–Nuremberg
- Awards: ACM Fellow (2025)
- Scientific career
- Fields: Computer science
- Workplaces: TU Dresden; Aalborg University
- Thesis: Anfrageverarbeitung in multidimensionalen Datenbanksystemen (1998)
- Doctoral advisor: Hartmut Wedekind

Wolfgang Martin Josef Lehner (born 1969 in Vilseck) is a German computer scientist. He is noted for his contributions to databases and data management systems.

Lehner is a university professor at the Institute for Systems Architecture and Head of the Database Research Group at TU Dresden and a professor at the Computer Science Department of Aalborg University, Denmark.

== Publications ==
Lehner has published 5 textbooks and over 500 co-authored and peer-reviewed publications in data management publication outlets. According to Google Scholar, as of September 2025, he has an H-index of 53.

== Recognition ==
Lehner is appointed member of the Scientific Commission of the German Science and Humanities Council. Also, he is Vice-President of the Endowment of Very Large Databases Inc. (VLDB). He is known for his contributions to SAP HANA. In 2025, he was named ACM Fellow "for contributions to architectures of main-memory database management systems". For his contributions to Computer Science, The German Informatics Society (GI), named him GI Fellow 2026.
