= John Zorn discography =

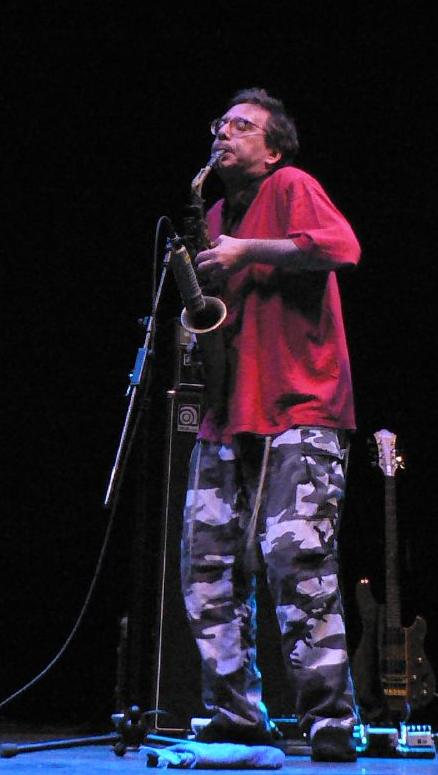
Zorn in 2006

John Zorn appears on over 400 recordings as a composer or performer. This is a selection of recordings released under his name, bands he was/is part of, collaborations with other musicians, and significant albums to which he has contributed. The year indicates when the album was first released and any subsequent years if the following release included additional material.

== John Zorn ==
- Locus Solus (1983 & 1997)
- Ganryu Island (1984 & 1998)
- The Big Gundown (1985 & 2000, remastered, with bonus tracks)
- Spillane (1987)
- Spy vs Spy: The Music of Ornette Coleman (1989)
- Elegy (1992)
- Kristallnacht (1993)
- First Recordings 1973 (1995)
- New Traditions in East Asian Bar Bands (1997)
- The Bribe (1998)
- Godard/Spillane (1999)
- IAO (2002)
- Sanatorium Under the Sign of the Hourglass: A Tribute to Bruno Schultz - The Cracow Klezmer Band Plays John Zorn (2005)
- Femina (2009)
- Dictée/Liber Novus (2010)
- The Goddess (2010)
- Interzone (2010)
- The Satyr's Play / Cerberus (2011 & 2012, deluxe edition book ltd. 66 copies)
- Mount Analogue (2012)
- Nosferatu (2012)
- The Song Project (2014)
- In The Hall of Mirrors (2014)
- The Song Project Live at Le Poisson Rouge (2015)
- Forro Zinho - Forro in the Dark Plays Zorn (2015)
- James Moore Plays The Book of Heads (2015)
- The Urmuz Epigrams (2018)
- In a Convex Mirror (2018)
- Tractatus Musico-Philosophicus (2019)
- Perchance To Dream... (2022)
- Hannigan Sings Zorn Volume One (2024)
- Hannigan Sings Zorn Volume Two (2024)
- Flatlands (2026)

== The Parachute Years ==
Recordings originally recorded or released between 1977 and 1981. Grouped in 1997 box set and then issued separately in 2000.

- Lacrosse (1977, 2000)[2CD]
- Pool (1980, 2000)
- Hockey (1980, 2002)
- Archery (1981, 2001)[3CD]

== The Classic Guide to Strategy ==
- The Classic Guide to Strategy: Volume 1 (1983)
- The Classic Guide to Strategy: Volume 2 (1985)
- The Classic Guide to Strategy (1996, collects the out of print Volumes 1 & 2)
- 50th Birthday Celebration Volume 9: The Classic Guide to Strategy Volume Three (by John Zorn, 2004)
- The Classic Guide to Strategy: Volume 4 (2016)

== Cobra performances & other game pieces ==
- Cobra (1987)
- John Zorn's Cobra: Live at the Knitting Factory (1992)
- John Zorn's Cobra: Tokyo Operations '94 (1994)
- Xu Feng: John Zorn's Game Pieces Volume 1 (2000)
- Cobra: John Zorn's Game Pieces Volume 2 (2002)

== With Naked City ==
- Naked City (1990)
- Torture Garden (1990)
- Grand Guignol (1992)
- Leng Tch'e (1992)
- Heretic (1992)
- Radio (1993)
- Absinthe (1993)
- Black Box (1996, collects Torture Garden & Leng Tch'e & 2010, 20th Anniversary Edition) 2CD
- Naked City Live, Vol. 1: The Knitting Factory 1989 (2002)
- Naked City: The Complete Studio Recordings (2005) 5CD

== With Painkiller ==
- Guts of a Virgin EP (1991)
- Buried Secrets EP (1992)
- Rituals: Live in Japan (1993)
- Execution Ground (1994)
- Collected Works (1997)[4CD] – includes Guts of a Virgin, Buried Secrets, Execution Ground, Live in Osaka and bonus material
- Guts of a Virgin/Buried Secrets (1998) – collects first two EPs
- Talisman: Live in Nagoya (2002)
- 50th Birthday Celebration Volume 12 (2005) – guest vocals by Mike Patton
- The Prophecy: Live in Europe (2013)
- Samsara (2024)
- The Equinox (2025)
- The Great God Pan (2025)

== Filmworks series ==
- Filmworks 1986–1990 (1991)
- Filmworks II: Music for an Untitled Film by Walter Hill (1995)
- Filmworks III: 1990–1995 (1995)
- Filmworks IV: S/M + More (1996)
- Filmworks V: Tears of Ecstasy (1996)
- Filmworks VI: 1996 (1997)
- Filmworks VII: Cynical Hysterie Hour (1997, originally in 1989 as "Cynical Hysterie Tour", Japan only)
- Filmworks VIII: 1997 (1998)
- Filmworks IX: Trembling Before G-d (2000)
- Filmworks X: In the Mirror of Maya Deren (2001)
- Filmworks XI: Secret Lives (2002)
- Filmworks XII: Three Documentaries (2002)
- Filmworks XIII: Invitation to a Suicide (2002)
- Filmworks XIV: Hiding and Seeking (2003)
- Filmworks XV: Protocols of Zion (2005)
- Filmworks XVI: Workingman's Death (2005)
- Filmworks Anthology: 20 Years of Soundtrack Music (2005) - compilation of tracks from first 15 Filmworks albums plus one unissued recording
- Filmworks XVII: Notes on Marie Menken/Ray Bandar: A Life with Skulls (2006)
- Filmworks XVIII: The Treatment (2006)
- Filmworks XIX: The Rain Horse (2008)
- Filmworks XX: Sholem Aleichem (2008)
- Filmworks XXI: Belle de Nature/The New Rijksmuseum (2008)
- Filmworks XXII: The Last Supper (2008)
- Filmworks XXIII: El General (2009)
- Filmworks XXIV: The Nobel Prizewinner (2010)
- Filmworks XXV: City of Slaughter/Schmatta/Beyond the Infinite (2013)

== With Masada ==
- Alef (1994)
- Beit (1994)
- Gimel (1994)
- Dalet EP (1995)
- Hei (1995)
- Vav (1995)
- Zayin (1996)
- Het (1997)
- Tet (1998)
- Yod (1998)
- Live in Taipei 1995 (1998)[2CD]
- Live in Jerusalem 1994 (1999)[2CD]
- Live in Middelheim 1999 (1999)
- Live in Sevilla 2000 (2000)
- Live at Tonic 2001 (2001)[2CD]
- First Live 1993 (2002)
- 50th Birthday Celebration Volume 7 (2004)
- Sanhedrin 1994–1997 (2005)[2CD]

== Composer Series ==
- Redbird (1995)
- The Book of Heads (1995)
- Duras: Duchamp (1997)
- Angelus Novus (1998)
- Aporias: Requia for Piano and Orchestra (1998)
- The String Quartets (1999)
- Madness, Love and Mysticism (2001)
- Songs from the Hermetic Theatre (2001)
- Chimeras (2003 & 2010, Revised Edition)
- Magick (2004)
- Rituals (2005)
- Mysterium (2005)
- From Silence to Sorcery (2007)
- What Thou Wilt (2010)
- Music and Its Double (2012)
- Lemma (2013)
- On the Torment of Saints, the Casting of Spells and the Evocation of Spirits (2013)

== 21st Century Concert Music ==
- Cartoon S/M (2000)
- Rimbaud (2012)
- Shir Hashirim (2013)
- The Alchemist (2014)
- Fragmentations, Prayers and Interjections (2014)
- Myth and Mythopoeia (2014)
- Hen to Pan (2015)
- Madrigals (2016)
- Sacred Visions (2016)
- Commedia Dell'arte (2016)
- There Is No More Firmament (2017)
- The Interpretation of Dreams (2017)
- Encomia (2019)
- Les Maudits (2020)
- Azoth (2020)
- The Turner Études (2020)
- Heaven And Earth Magick (2021)
- Song of Songs (CD book, 2022)
- The Complete String Quartets (2025)
- Fantasma (2025)
- Prolegomena (2025)

== Masada String Trio ==
- Bar Kokhba (1996)[2CD] – on 10 tracks
- The Circle Maker (1998)[2CD] – Disc 1 by Masada String Trio, Disc 2 by Bar Kokhba Sextet
- 50th Birthday Celebration Volume 1 (2004)
- Azazel: Book of Angels Volume 2 (2005)
- Haborym: Book of Angels Volume 16 (2010)

== Bar Kokhba Sextet ==
- Bar Kokhba (1996)[2CD]
- The Circle Maker (1998)[2CD] – Disc 1 by Masada String Trio, Disc 2 by Bar Kokhba Sextet
- 50th Birthday Celebration Volume 11 (2005)
- Lucifer: Book of Angels Volume 10 (2008)

== Music Romance series ==
- Music for Children (Vol 1, 1998)
- Taboo & Exile (Vol 2, 1999)
- The Gift (Vol 3, 2001)

== With Hemophiliac ==
- Hemophiliac (2002)
- 50th Birthday Celebration Volume 6 (2004)

== Masada Anniversary series ==
- Masada Anniversary Edition Vol. 1: Masada Guitars (2003)
- Masada Anniversary Edition Vol. 2: Voices in the Wilderness (2003)
- Masada Anniversary Edition Vol. 3: The Unknown Masada (2003)
- Masada Anniversary Edition Vol. 4: Masada Recital (2004)
- Masada Anniversary Edition Vol. 5: Masada Rock (2005)

== 50th Birthday Celebration series ==
- 50th Birthday Celebration Volume 1 (by Masada String Trio, 2004)
- 50th Birthday Celebration Volume 2 (by Milford Graves/John Zorn, 2004)
- 50th Birthday Celebration Volume 3 (by Locus Solus, 2004)
- 50th Birthday Celebration Volume 4 (by Electric Masada, 2004)
- 50th Birthday Celebration Volume 5 (by Fred Frith/John Zorn, 2004)
- 50th Birthday Celebration Volume 6 (by Hemophiliac, 2004)
- 50th Birthday Celebration Volume 7 (by Masada, 2004)
- 50th Birthday Celebration Volume 8 (by Wadada Leo Smith/Susie Ibarra/John Zorn, 2004)
- 50th Birthday Celebration Volume 9: The Classic Guide to Strategy Volume Three (by John Zorn, 2004)
- 50th Birthday Celebration Volume 10 (by Yamataka Eye/John Zorn, 2005)
- 50th Birthday Celebration Volume 11 (by Bar Kokhba Sextet, 2005)[3CD]
- 50th Birthday Celebration Volume 12 (by Painkiller, 2005)

== With Electric Masada ==
- 50th Birthday Celebration Volume 4 (2004)
- At the Mountains of Madness (2005)[2CD]

== Masada Book Two - The Book of Angels ==
- Astaroth: Book of Angels Volume 1 (by Jamie Saft Trio, 2005)
- Azazel: Book of Angels Volume 2 (by Masada String Trio, 2005)
- Malphas: Book of Angels Volume 3 (by Mark Feldman & Sylvie Courvoisier, 2006)
- Orobas: Book of Angels Volume 4 (by Koby Israelite, 2006)
- Balan: Book of Angels Volume 5 (by The Cracow Klezmer Band, 2006)
- Moloch: Book of Angels Volume 6 (by Uri Caine, 2006)
- Asmodeus: Book of Angels Volume 7 (by Marc Ribot, 2007)
- Volac: Book of Angels Volume 8 (by Erik Friedlander, 2007)
- Xaphan: Book of Angels Volume 9 (by Secret Chiefs 3, 2008)
- Lucifer: Book of Angels Volume 10 (by Bar Kokhba Sextet, 2008)
- Zaebos: Book of Angels Volume 11 (by Medeski, Martin and Wood, 2008)
- Stolas: Book of Angels Volume 12 (by Masada Quintet featuring Joe Lovano, 2009)
- Mycale: Book of Angels Volume 13 (by Mycale, 2010)
- Ipos: Book of Angels Volume 14 (by The Dreamers, 2010)
- Baal: Book of Angels Volume 15 (by Ben Goldberg Quartet, 2010)
- Haborym: Book of Angels Volume 16 (by Masada String Trio, 2010)
- Caym: Book of Angels Volume 17 (by Banquet of the Spirits, 2011)
- Pruflas: Book of Angels Volume 18 (by David Krakauer, 2012)
- Abraxas: Book of Angels Volume 19 (by Shanir Ezra Blumenkranz, 2012)
- Tap: Book of Angels Volume 20 (by Pat Metheny, 2013)
- Alastor: Book of Angels Volume 21 (by Eyvind Kang, 2014)
- Adramelech: Book of Angels Volume 22 (by Zion80, 2014)
- Aguares: Book of Angels Volume 23 (by Roberto Juan Rodríguez, 2014)
- Amon: Book of Angels Volume 24 (by Klezmerson, 2015)
- Gomory: Book of Angels Volume 25 (by Mycale, 2015)
- Cerberus: Book of Angels Volume 26 (by The SPIKE Orchestra, 2015)
- Flaga: Book of Angels Volume 27 (by Flaga, 2016)
- Andras: Book of Angels Volume 28 (by Nova Express Quintet, 2016)
- Flauros: Book of Angels Volume 29 (by AutorYno, 2016)
- Leonard: Book of Angels Volume 30 (by Garth Knox and The Saltarello Trio, 2017)
- Buer: Book of Angels Volume 31 (by The Brian Marsella Trio, 2017)
- Paimon: Book of Angels Volume 32 (by Mary Halvorson Quartet, 2017)

== Masada Book Three - The Book Beri'ah (2018) ==
- CD1 - Keter (by Sofia Rei & JC Maillard)
- CD2 - Chokhma (by Cleric)
- CD3 - Binah (by The Spike Orchestra)
- CD4 - Chesed (by Julian Lage & Gyan Riley)
- CD5 - Gevurah (by Abraxas)
- CD6 - Tiferet (by Klezmerson)
- CD7 - Netzach (by The Gnostic Trio)
- CD8 - Hod (by Zion80)
- CD9 - Yesod (by Banquet of the Spirits)
- CD10 - Malkhut (by Secret Chiefs 3)
- CD11 - Da'at (by Craig Taborn & Vadim Neselovskyi)

== New Masada Quartet ==
- New Masada Quartet (2021)
- New Masada Quartet, Volume Two (2023)
- New Masada Quartet, Volume Three (2024)

== Moonchild ==
- Moonchild: Songs Without Words (2006)
- Astronome (2006)
- Six Litanies for Heliogabalus (2007) with John Zorn, Jamie Saft, Ikue Mori & chorus
- The Crucible (2008) with John Zorn & Marc Ribot
- Ipsissimus (2010) - with John Zorn & Marc Ribot
- Templars: In Sacred Blood (2012) with John Medeski
- The Last Judgment (2014) with John Medeski

== The Dreamers ==
- The Dreamers (2008)
- O'o (2009)
- Ipos: Book of Angels Volume 14 (2010)
- A Dreamers Christmas (2011)
- The Christmas Song / Santa's Workshop 7" single (2011)
- Pellucidar: A Dreamers Fantabula (2015)

== Nova Express ==
- Nova Express (2011)
- At the Gates of Paradise (2011)
- A Vision in Blakelight (2012)
- The Concealed (2012)
- Dreamachines (2013)
- On Leaves of Grass (2014)
- Andras: Book of Angels Volume 28 (2016)

== The Gnostic Trio ==
- The Gnostic Preludes (2012)
- The Mysteries (2013)
- In Lambeth (2013)
- The Testament of Solomon (2014)
- Transmigration of the Magus (2014)
- The Mockingbird (2016)
- Masada Book Three - The Book Beri'ah - Netzach: Eternity (2018)
- Gnosis: The Inner Light (2021)
- Sing Me Now Asleep (2026) (featuring Ikue Mori)

== Alhambra ==
- Alhambra Love Songs (2009)
- In Search of the Miraculous (2010)
- The Goddess – Music for the Ancient of Days (2010)

== The Hermetic Organ ==
- The Hermetic Organ (2012)
- The Hermetic Organ Vol. 2 - St. Paul's Chapel (2014)
- The Hermetic Organ Vol. 3 - St. Paul's Hall, Huddersfield (2015)
- The Hermetic Organ Vol. 4 - St. Bart's (2016)
- The Hermetic Organ Vol. 5 - Philharmonie De Paris (2017)
- The Hermetic Organ Vol. 6 - For Edgar Allan Poe (2019)
- The Hermetic Organ Vol. 7 - St. John the Divine (2019)
- The Hermetic Organ Vol. 8 - For Antonin Artaud (2019)
- The Hermetic Organ Vol. 9 - Liber VII (2022)
- The Hermetic Organ Vol. 10 - Bozar, Brussels (2022)
- The Hermetic Organ Vol. 11 - For Terry Riley (2024)
- The Hermetic Organ vol. 12 - The Bosch Requiem (2024)
- The Hermetic Organ vol. 13 - Biennale Musica Venezia (2024)

== Abraxas ==
- Abraxas: Book of Angels Volume 19 (2012)
- Psychomagia (2014)
- Masada Book Three - The Book Beri'ah - Gevurah: Severity (2018)

== Enigmata ==
- Enigmata (2011)
- Valentine's Day (2014)

== Simulacrum ==
- Simulacrum (2015)
- The True Discoveries of Witches and Demons (feat. Trevor Dunn & Marc Ribot, 2015)
- Inferno (2015)
- The Painted Bird (feat. Ches Smith & Kenny Wollesen, 2016)
- 49 Acts Of Unspeakable Depravity In The Abominable Life And Times Of Gilles De Rais (2016)
- The Garden Of Earthly Delights (feat. Trevor Dunn, 2017)
- Beyond Good And Evil—Simulacrum Live (2020)
- Baphomet (2020)
- Nostradamus: The Death Of Satan (2021)
- Spinoza (feat. Bill Frisell & John Zorn, 2022)

== Insurrection ==
- Insurrection (2018)
- Salem, 1692 (2018)

== Chaos Magick ==
- Chaos Magick (Nothing Is True — Everything Is Permitted) (2021)
- The Ninth Circle (Orpheus In The Underworld) (2021)
- Multiplicities: A Repository Of Non-Existent Objects (2022)
- 444 (2023)
- Parrhesiastes (2023)
- Through The Looking Glass (2025)

== Julian Lage & Gyan Riley ==
- Midsummer Moons (2017)
- Masada Book Three - The Book Beri'ah - Chesed: Loving Kindness (2018)
- John Zorn's Bagatelles Vol. 10 (2022)
- Quatrain (2023)
- Her Melodious Lay (2024)
- Seven Sonnets (2026)

== Julian Lage / Gyan Riley / Bill Frisell ==
- Nove Cantici Per Francesco D'Assisi (2019)
- Virtue (2020)
- Teresa De Avila (2021)
- Parables (2021)
- A Garden of Forking Paths (2022)
- Nothing Is As Real As Nothing (2023)
- Lamentations (2024)

== Brian Marsella Trio ==
- Buer: Book of Angels Volume 31 (2017)
- The Hierophant (2019)
- Calculus (2020)
- Meditations on the Tarot (2021)
- John Zorn's Bagatelles Vol. 6 (2022)

== Brian Marsella / Jorge Roeder / Ches Smith ==
Main line releases:

- Suite for Piano (2022)
- Ballades (2024)
- Impromptus (2025)
- Nocturnes (2025)
- Fantasias (2026)

Parallel line releases:

- The Fourth Way (2023)
- Ou Phrontis (2024)
- Alea Icta Est (2026) (featuring Sae Hashimoto)

== Incerto ==
- Incerto (2022)
- Multiplicities II: A Repository Of Non-Existent Objects (2023)
- Full Fathom Five (2023)
- Homenaje A Remedios Varo (2023)

== John Zorn's Bagatelles ==
Set One (2021)

- Vol 1 (by Mary Halvorson Quartet)
- Vol 2 (by Erik Friedlander and Michael Nicolas)
- Vol 3 (by Trigger)
- Vol 4 (by Ikue Mori)

Set Two (2021)

- Vol 5 (by Kris Davis Quartet)
- Vol 6 (by Brian Marsella Trio)
- Vol 7 (by Brian Marsella)
- Vol 8 (by John Medeski Trio)

Set Three (2022)

- Vol 9 (by Asmodeus)
- Vol 10 (by Julian Lage & Gyan Riley)
- Vol 11 (by Jim Black Quartet)
- Vol 12 (by Cleric)

Set Four (2023)

- Vol 13 (by Speed-Irabagon Quartet with John Zorn)
- Vol 14 (by Peter Evans)
- Vol 15 (by Ben Goldberg 4)
- Vol 16 (by Sam Eastmond)

== John Zorn's Olympiad ==
- Dither Plays Zorn – Volume 1 (by Dither, 2015)
- Fencing 1978 – Volume 2 (2022)
- Pops Plays Pops-Eugene Chadbourne Plays The Book Of Heads – Volume 3 (2022)
- Curling - Volume 4 (2026)

== Album collaborations ==
- School (by Eugene Chadbourne & John Zorn, 1978)
- In Memory of Nikki Arane (by Eugene Chadbourne & John Zorn, 1980)
- Yankees (by John Zorn, Derek Bailey, & George E. Lewis, 1983)
- Deadly Weapons (by Steve Beresford, John Zorn, Tonie Marshall & David Toop, 1986)
- Voodoo (by the Sonny Clark Memorial Quartet - Zorn, Wayne Horvitz, Bobby Previte and Ray Drummond, 1986)
- News for Lulu (by John Zorn, Bill Frisell & George E. Lewis, 1988)
- More News for Lulu (by John Zorn, Bill Frisell & George E. Lewis, 1992)
- Improvised Music New York 1981 (by Bill Laswell, Sonny Sharrock, Fred Frith, Derek Bailey, Charles K. Noyes & John Zorn, 1992)
- The Art of Memory (by John Zorn & Fred Frith, 1994 - reissued in 1999)
- Zohar (by The Mystic Fugu Orchestra (John Zorn & Yamataka Eye), 1995)
- Nani Nani (by John Zorn & Yamataka Eye, 1995)
- Harras (by Derek Bailey, John Zorn, & William Parker 1996)
- Euclid's Nightmare (by John Zorn & Bobby Previte 1997)
- Weird Little Boy (by Weird Little Boy - John Zorn, Trey Spruance, William Winant, Mike Patton and Chris Cochrane, 1998)
- Downtown Lullaby (by John Zorn, Wayne Horvitz, Elliott Sharp, & Bobby Previte, 1998)
- 1977 1981 (by Eugene Chadbourne & John Zorn, 1998)
- Prelapse (by Prelapse, 1999)
- Ars Longa Dens Brevis (by Fred Frith, Onnyk & Toyozumi Yoshisaburo & John Zorn, 2000, recorded live in 1985 & 1987)
- Buck Jam Tonic (by Tatsuya Nakamura, Bill Laswell, & John Zorn, 2003)
- Naninani II (by John Zorn & Yamataka Eye, 2004)
- The Stone: Issue One (by John Zorn, Dave Douglas, Mike Patton, Bill Laswell, Rob Burger, & Ben Perowsky, 2006)
- The Stone: Issue Three (by John Zorn, Lou Reed & Laurie Anderson, 2008)
- The Art of Memory II (by John Zorn & Fred Frith, 2008)
- Late Works (by John Zorn & Fred Frith, 2010)
- The Receiving Surfaces (by John Zorn and Rova Saxophone Quartet, 2011)
- @ (by John Zorn and Thurston Moore, 2013)
- The Dream Membrane (by David Smith, Bill Laswell and John Zorn, 2014)
- Sonic Rivers (by George E. Lewis, Wadada Leo Smith and John Zorn, 2014)
- Blink (by Yoko Ono & John Zorn, single-sided 10-inch, 2015)
- Songs for Petra (John Zorn / Jesse Harris, 2020)
- Shinjuku Pit Inn (by Soup with John Zorn)
- The Cleansing (John Zorn & Bill Laswell, 2022)
- Memoria (John Zorn & Bill Laswell, 2023)
- Love Songs Live (John Zorn / Jesse Harris, 2024)
- Memories, Dreams, and Reflections (John Zorn / Dave Lombardo, 2025)
- Alchemical Theatre (John Zorn / Ikue Mori / Jim Staley, 2025)
- Those Landings (John Zorn / Evan Parker, 2026)

== Albums featured ==
- Lowe & Behold (by The Frank Lowe Orchestra featuring Joseph Bowie, Butch Morris, Arthur Williams, Billy Bang, Polly Bradfield, Eugene Chadbourne, John Lindberg, Phillip Wilson, John Zorn, Peter Kuhn, 1977)
- Environment for Sextet (by Andrea Centazzo with Eugene Chadbourne, Tom Cora, Toshinori Kondo, Polly Bradfield & John Zorn, 1979)
- The Golden Palominos (by The Golden Palominos - Anton Fier/Fred Frith/Bill Laswell/Arto Lindsay/John Zorn, 1983)
- OTB (by Jim Staley with John Zorn, 1984)
- Hallowed Ground (by The Violent Femmes, 1984)
- Berlin Djungle (by Peter Brötzmann Clarinet Project, 1984)
- That's the Way I Feel Now: A Tribute to Thelonious Monk (tribute album, 1984 - featuring John Zorn performing "Shuffle Boil" - excluded from CD reissue)
- Lost in the Stars: The Music of Kurt Weill (tribute album, 1985 - Zorn performs "Der kleine Leutnant des lieben Gottes" (The Little Lieutenant of the Loving God) from Happy End)
- Experimental Performance With John Zorn (by Jojo Takayanagi with John Zorn, 1986)
- The Godard Fans: Godard ça vous chante? (tribute album featuring 'Godard', 1986)
- Points Blank - (Meltable Snaps It, 1986 – Zorn conducts "Rugby")
- The Technology of Tears (by Fred Frith, 1988)
- Replicant Walk (by Friction, 1988)
- Comme des Garçons Vol. 1 (by Seigen Ono, 1988)
- Comme des Garçons Vol. 2 (by Seigen Ono, 1989)
- Purged Specimen (by Blind Idiot God, 1989)
- Square Dance (by The Intergalactic Maiden Ballet, 1990)
- NekonoTopia NekonoMania (by Seigen Ono, 1990) - Zorn plays sax on 6 tracks
- Live at the Knitting Factory Volume 3 (various artists, 1990) - Zorn plays alto sax on 2 tracks with Slan
- Winter Was Hard (by Kronos Quartet, 1990)
- Ignorance (by Morrie, 1990) - Zorn plays alto sax on track 2 "パラドックス"
- Attention Span (by Bob Ostertag with John Zorn & with Fred Frith, 1990)
- Lo Flux Tube (by OLD, 1991)
- Mr. Bungle (by Mr. Bungle, 1991) - produced by John Zorn & plays uncredited sax on 1 track
- Possession (by GOD, 1992)
- How I Got Over (by God Is My Co-Pilot, 1992)
- We Insist? (by Otomo Yoshihide, 1992)
- Welcome to Forbidden Paradise (by Hoppy Kamiyama, 1992)
- Early Works (by Ruins, 1992)
- Blue Planet Man (by Big John Patton, 1993)
- Speed Yr Trip (by God Is My Co-Pilot, 1993)
- Ground Zero (by Ground Zero, 1993)
- Sacrifist (by Praxis, 1994)
- Bar del Mattatoio (by Seigen Ono 1994) - Zorn plays sax on 2 tracks
- Peace on Earth (Music of John Coltrane) (by Prima Materia, 1994) - Zorn plays sax on 2 tracks
- Mais (by Marisa Monte, 1994)
- Company 91 Volume 1 (by Company, 1994) - first of three volumes documenting five-day 1991 improv collaboration with Derek Bailey, Alexander Bălănescu, Buckethead, Paul Lovens, Vanessa Mackness, Yves Robert, Paul Rogers, and Pat Thomas
- Company 91 Volume 2 (by Company, 1994)
- Company 91 Volume 3 (by Company, 1994)
- Minor Swing (by John Patton, 1995)
- Signals for Tea (by Steve Beresford, 1995)
- Hex Kitchen (by Ikue Mori, 1995) - John Zorn plays clarinet on this album
- State of the Union (by various artists, 1996)
- Hsi-Yu Chi (by David Shea, 1996)
- Vira Loucos (by Cyro Baptista, 1996) - Zorn plays alto on 2 tracks
- Cross Fire (by Music Revelation Ensemble, 1997)
- Pranzo Oltranzista (by Mike Patton, 1997)
- Great Jewish Music: Serge Gainsbourg (by various artists, 1997)
- Shoe String Symphonettes (by Marc Ribot, 1997)
- Busy Being Born (by Gary Lucas, 1998)
- Vision Volume One (by various artists, 1998)
- Hallelujah, Anyway – Remembering Tom Cora (by various artists, 1999)
- Paradiso (by Seigen Ono, 2000)
- Satlah (by Daniel Zamir, 2000) - Zorn plays alto on 3 tracks
- Street of Lost Brothers (by Gary Lucas, 2000)
- Maria & Maria (by Seigen Ono, 2001)
- Scientist at Work (by Frank London, 2002)
- Children of Israel (by Daniel Zamir, 2002)
- Beat the Donkey (by Cyro Baptista, 2002) - Zorn plays alto on 1 track
- Irving Stone Memorial Concert (by various artists, 2003)
- Cyborg Acoustics (by Raz Mesinai, 2004)
- Lake Biwa (by Wadada Leo Smith, 2004)
- Solo Works - The Lumina Recordings (by Ned Rothenberg, 2006)
- For the Moment (by Paul Brody, 2007)
- Devushki payut (by Auktyon, 2007)
- Inamorata (by Method of Defiance, 2007) - Zorn plays alto on 1 track with the Masada String Trio
- Banquet of the Spirits (by Cyro Baptista, 2008) - Zorn plays alto on 1 track
- Eretz Hakodesh (by Pissuk Rachav, 2009)
- Luminescence (by Borah Bergman Trio, 2009)
- The Ducks Palace (by The Duck Baker Project, 2009) - Zorn plays alto on 2 tracks
- Homeland (by Laurie Anderson, 2011) - Zorn plays alto on 2 tracks
- Utilitarian (by Napalm Death, 2012) - Zorn plays two sax solos on track "Everyday Pox".
- The Road to Jajouka (by The Master Musicians of Jajouka led by Bachir Attar, 2013)
- I Am the Last of All the Field That Fell: A Channel (by Current 93, 2014)
- Celebrate Ornette (by various artists, 2016) - 1 track on Ornette Coleman tribute alongside Bill Laswell, Laurie Anderson and Stewart Hurwood
- Retrocausal (by Cleric, 2017)
