= Painkiller: The Collected Works =

Collected Works

Compilation album by Painkiller
- Released: 17 February 1998
- Recorded: 1991–1994
- Genre: Avant-garde jazz, grindcore
- Length: 198:07
- Label: Tzadik
- Producer: John Zorn

Painkiller chronology
Execution Ground (1994)	Collected Works (1998)	Guts of A Virgin/Buried Secrets (1998)

Collected Works is a 1998 four disc box set by the American musical group Painkiller. The set contains the group's complete studio recordings from 1991 to 1994 (Guts of a Virgin, Buried Secrets and Execution Ground) plus a live album previously released on the Japanese edition of Execution Ground.

== Track listing ==
- Disc zero
1. "Scud Attack" – 3:07
2. "Deadly Obstacle Collage" – 0:21
3. "Damage To The Mask" – 2:43
4. "Guts of A Virgin" – 1:19
5. "Handjob" – 0:10
6. "Portent" – 4:00
7. "Hostage" – 2:24
8. "Lathe of God" – 0:56
9. "Dr. Phibes" – 3:00
10. "Purgatory of Fiery Vulvas" – 0:26
11. "Warhead" – 1:12
12. "Devil's Eye" – 4:37
13. "Tortured Souls" – 1:52
14. "One-Eyed Pessary" – 1:50
15. "Trailmaker" – 0:03
16. "Blackhole Dub" – 3:29
17. "Buried Secrets" – 6:13
18. "The Ladder" – 0:22
19. "Executioner" – 2:48
20. "Black Chamber" – 2:28
21. "Skinned" – 0:54
22. "The Toll" – 6:25
23. "Marianne" – 7:50 (bonus track)
- Disc one:
1. "Parish of Tama (Ossuary Dub)" – 16:05
2. "Morning of Balachaturdasi" – 14:45
3. "Pashupatinath" – 13:47
- Disc two:
1. "Pashupatinath (ambient)" – 20:00
2. "Parish of Tama (ambient)" – 19:19
- Disc three:
1. "Gandhamadana" – 12:58
2. "Vaidurya" – 8:58
3. "Satapitaka" – 11:15
4. "Bodkyithangga" – 13:04
5. John Zorn & Eye encore:
  - "Black Bile" – 1:45
  - "Yellow Bile" – 0:58
  - "Blue Bile" – 2:40
  - "Crimson Bile" – 1:46
  - "Ivory Bile" – 1:26

== Personnel ==
- John Zorn – alto saxophone, vocals
- Bill Laswell – bass
- Mick Harris – drums, vocals
- Justin Broadrick – guitar, drum machine, vocals on "Buried Secrets" and "The Toll"
- G.C. Green – bass on "Buried Secrets" and "The Toll"
- Yamatsuka Eye – vocals on "Bodkyithangga", "Black Bile", "Yellow Bile", "Blue Bile", "Crimson Bile", "Ivory Bile"
