= Grand Guignol (album) =

Studio album by Naked City
- Released: 1992
- Recorded: 1989−1992
- Genre: Avant-garde jazz; grindcore; avant-garde metal; chamber
- Length: 62:00
- Label: Avant
- Producer: John Zorn

Naked City chronology
Torture Garden (1990)	Grand Guignol (1992)	Heretic (1992)

John Zorn chronology
Buried Secrets (1992)	Grand Guignol (1992)	Elegy (1992)

Grand Guignol is the second full-length studio album released by John Zorn's band Naked City in 1992 on the Japanese Avant label. The album followed Torture Garden, which was a compilation of "hardcore miniatures" from Naked City and Grand Guignol. The album is notable for the inclusion of cover versions of pieces written by classical composers, the guest vocal of Bob Dorough, and also, like Torture Garden, a selection of "hardcore miniatures" (tracks 9–41) which are intense, fast-tempo, brief compositions, which feature the wailing of Zorn's alto sax, and the screams of Yamatsuka Eye. The album is titled after the infamous Grand Guignol theater in Paris, which was open from 1897 to 1962, where performances centered around extreme violence.

Grand Guignol was remastered and re-released in 2005 as part of the Tzadik box set Naked City: The Complete Studio Recordings, with the bonus track "Grand Guignol (Version Vocale)" featuring Mike Patton, and an altered track sequencing.

== Reception ==
The Allmusic review by Ted Mills awarded the album 4 stars stating "Naked City's follow up to their self-titled album is a departure from the New York noir that they had perfected... A rewarding album."

Professional ratings
Review scores
Source	Rating
Allmusic	4/5 stars

== In popular culture ==
Two of the tracks ("Bonehead" and "Hellraiser") were featured in the soundtrack to Michael Haneke's 1997 film Funny Games, and in Haneke's 2007 remake.

== Track listing ==
All compositions and arrangements by John Zorn, except where noted.

No.	Title	Writer(s)	Length
1.	"Grand Guignol"		17:41
2.	"La cathédrale engloutie"	Claude Debussy	6:24
3.	"Three Preludes Op. 74: Douloureux, déchirant"	Alexander Scriabin	1:17
4.	"Three Preludes Op. 74: Très lent, contemplatif"	Scriabin	1:43
5.	"Three Preludes Op. 74: Allegro drammatico"	Scriabin	0:49
6.	"Prophetiae Sibyllarum"	Orlande de Lassus	1:46
7.	"The Cage"	Charles Ives	2:01
8.	"Louange à l'éternité de Jésus"	Olivier Messiaen	7:08
9.	"Blood Is Thin"		1:02
10.	"Thrash Jazz Assassin"		0:47
11.	"Dead Spot"		0:33
12.	"Bonehead"		0:54
13.	"Piledriver"		0:36
14.	"Shangkuan Ling-Feng"		1:16
15.	"Numbskull"		0:31
16.	"Perfume of a Critic's Burning Flesh"		0:26
17.	"Jazz Snob: Eat Shit"		0:26
18.	"The Prestidigitator"		0:46
19.	"No Reason to Believe"		0:28
20.	"Hellraiser"		0:41
21.	"Torture Garden"		0:37
22.	"Slan"		0:24
23.	"The Ways of Pain"		0:33
24.	"The Noose"		0:13
25.	"Sack of Shit"		0:46
26.	"Blunt Instrument"		0:56
27.	"Osaka Bondage"		1:17
28.	"Shallow Grave"		0:42
29.	"Kaoru"		0:53
30.	"Dead Dread"		0:48
31.	"Billy Liar"		0:13
32.	"Victims of Torture"		0:24
33.	"Speedfreaks"		0:50
34.	"New Jersey Scum Swamp"		0:44
35.	"S/M Sniper"		0:17
36.	"Pigfucker"		0:24
37.	"Cairo Chop Shop"		0:25
38.	"Facelifter"		0:57
39.	"Whiplash"		0:22
40.	"The Blade"		0:30
41.	"Gob of Spit"		0:21

== Personnel ==
- John Zorn – alto sax, vocals
- Bill Frisell – guitar
- Wayne Horvitz – keyboards
- Fred Frith – bass
- Joey Baron – drums
- Yamatsuka Eye – vocals
- Bob Dorough – vocals (on "The Cage")
