= Garden of forking paths (disambiguation) =

"The Garden of Forking Paths" ("El jardín de senderos que se bifurcan") is a short story by Jorge Luis Borges.

Garden of forking paths may also refer to

- The garden of forking paths fallacy in statistics
- "The Garden of Forking Paths" (FlashForward), a 2010 science fiction TV episode
- "The Garden of Forking Paths" (Once Upon a Time), a 2017 fantasy adventure drama TV episode
- A Garden of Forking Paths, a 2022 album by John Zorn
