= Heretic (Naked City album) =

Soundtrack album by Naked City
- Released: 1992
- Recorded: 1991
- Studio: Shelley Palmer Studios, NYC
- Genre: Free jazz, experimental rock
- Length: 56:34
- Label: Avant
- Producer: John Zorn

Naked City chronology
Grand Guignol (1992)	Heretic (1992)	Leng Tch'e (1992)

John Zorn chronology
More News for Lulu (1992)	Heretic (1992)	Buried Secrets (1992)

Heretic is the third studio album by the band Naked City. The record was featured as the soundtrack for the underground S/M film Jeux des Dames Cruelles. The album utilises different combinations of band members in duos and trios with the entire band performing together on only one track "Fire and Ice".

According to the Knitting Factory, "Heretic is an experimental narrative in the form of an extended trailer. A very funny take on psychotherapy starring Karen Finley."

== Reception ==
The Allmusic review by Caleb Deupree awarded the album 4½ stars stating "Although this album is credited as a soundtrack for a porn movie (scenes from which decorate the sleeve art), its music will appeal to many improv-oriented listeners who have a hard time with the thrash/hardcore atmosphere that is so characteristic of the band's first album and the Torture Garden pieces."

Professional ratings
Review scores
Source	Rating
Allmusic	4.5/5 stars

== Track listing ==
All music by Naked City

1. Main Titles (Eye, Horvitz, Baron) – 1:26
2. Sex Games (Frisell, Frith, Baron) – 2:21
3. The Brood (Zorn, Horvitz, Baron) – 2:48
4. Sweat, Sperm + Blood (Eye, Zorn) – 2:03
5. Vliet (Frisell, Frith) – 0:49
6. Heretic 1 (Zorn, Frith) – 2:32
7. Submission (Horvitz, Frisell, Baron) – 4:21
8. Heretic 2 (Zorn, Frith, Baron) – 1:44
9. Catacombs (Horvitz, Frisell) – 2:46
10. Heretic 3 (Zorn, Frith, Baron) – 2:41
11. My Master, My Slave (Horvitz, Frith) – 2:23
12. Saint Jude (Frisell, Frith, Baron) – 2:12
13. The Conqueror Worm (Zorn, Horvitz) – 2:31
14. Dominatrix 5B (Horvitz, Frisell, Baron) – 2:16
15. Back Through the Looking Glass (Frisell, Frith) – 2:39
16. Here Come the 7,000 Frogs (Eye, Zorn) – 1:59
17. Slaughterhouse/Chase Sequence (Frisell, Frith, Baron) – 2:18
18. Castle Keep (Horvitz, Frisell) – 1:48
19. Mantra of Resurrected Shit (Eye, Zorn) – 1:41
20. Trypsicore (Horvitz, Baron) – 1:46
21. Fire and Ice (Club Scene) (Naked City) – 2:37
22. Crosstalk (Horvitz, Frisell, Frith) – 1:40
23. Copraphagist Rituals (Eye, Horvitz, Baron) – 0:53
24. Labyrinth (Frisell, Baron) – 5:47

== Personnel ==
- John Zorn – alto saxophone
- Bill Frisell – guitar
- Wayne Horvitz – keyboards
- Fred Frith – bass
- Joey Baron – drums
- Yamatsuka Eye – vocals
