= Xu Feng (album) =

Studio album by John Zorn
- Released: September 26, 2000
- Recorded: May 28, 2000
- Studio: Different Fur
- Genre: Avant-garde
- Length: 74:34
- Label: Tzadik
- Producer: John Zorn

John Zorn chronology
Live in Sevilla 2000 (2000)	Xu Feng (2000)	Cartoon S/M (2000)

Xu Feng: John Zorn's Game Pieces Volume 1 is a studio album by American composer John Zorn consisting of game pieces. It features improvisations performed by an ensemble of pairs of musicians using the same instruments: Chris Brown and David Slusser on electronics; Fred Frith and John Schott on guitars; and Dave Lombardo and William Winant on drums and percussion. The album is titled after Xu Feng, a Taiwanese actress featured in many martial arts films who appears on the cover art, a still of Raining in the Mountain (1979).

== Reception ==
The Allmusic review by Dean McFarlane awarded the album 4 stars calling it "One of John Zorn's many outstanding works, the composer once again goes above and beyond listeners' expectations. Hearing this astonishing work, it is little wonder that John Zorn is often considered one of the more vital and influential figures in 20th century music".

Professional ratings
Review scores
Source	Rating
Allmusic	4/5 stars

== Track listing ==
All compositions by John Zorn.

1. "The Valiant Ones" - 10:21
2. "The Fate of Lee Khan" - 9:03
3. "Legend of the Mountain" - 4:07
4. "The Assassins" - 2:38
5. "Dragon Gate Inn" - 5:34
6. "The Beauty of Yang Hui-chen" - 10:48
7. "Trouble at Spring Inn" - 6:31
8. "Hidden Fortress" - 7:55
9. "Hsia Nü" - 7:41
10. "Raining in the Mountains" - 5:38
11. "A Touch of Zen" - 4:11

== Personnel ==
- John Zorn – composer, conductor
- Fred Frith – guitars
- John Schott – guitars
- Chris Brown – electronics
- David Slusser – electronics
- Dave Lombardo – drums, percussion
- William Winant – drums, percussion
