= Pissuk Rachav =

Israeli rock band

Pissuk Rachav is an Israeli rock band. The band's first album, Eretz Hakodesh (The Holy Land), was released on John Zorn's Tzadik record label in 2009. The band's style is eclectic, ranging from Arabic music to psychedelic rock, and the Hebrew lyrics move between the religious and the sexual.

== Band members ==
- Jeremy Fogel- vocals, clarinet.
- Ravid Zigdon- marimba, ritual instruments.
- Yaron Allouche- synthesizer, theremin.
- Noa Rimer- vocals.
- Saar Yachin- flutes.
- Erez Frank- bass.
- Ariel Armoni- drums.

== Eretz Hakodesh ==
Eretz Hakodesh is the first album by Pissuk Rachav. The album features special guests John Zorn, Marc Ribot, Itamar Greenberg and Aviad Zigdon. It was recorded in 2008 and released in 2009 on Tzadik Records.

=== Track listing ===
1. "Jesus Christ the Nazarene Runs in the Streets of Tel-Aviv" - 5:22
2. "Allenby Vagina Street" - 3:56
3. "Holy Bond" - 4:24
4. "A Feeling Divine" - 5:14
5. "Taqsim" - 2:51
6. "Song of Love" - 6:26
7. "End of Thought" - 7:49
8. "The Great Shofar" - 3:48
9. "Jerusalem" - 4:45
10. "Blessing" - 2:36
11. "Sweet Death of Roses" - 3:51
12. "The Holy Land" - 5:19
