= Dreamachines =

Studio album by John Zorn
- Released: July 20, 2013
- Recorded: April 2013
- Genre: Avant-garde, Jazz, Contemporary classical music
- Length: 46:02
- Label: Tzadik TZ 8308
- Producer: John Zorn

John Zorn chronology
Tap: Book of Angels Volume 20 (2013)	Dreamachines (2013)	"@" (2013)

Dreamachines is an album by John Zorn recorded in New York City in April 2013 and released on the Tzadik label in July 2013. The album is inspired by the works of William S. Burroughs and Brion Gysin.

== Reception ==
Professional ratings
Review scores
Source	Rating
Allmusic	3.5/5 stars
Free Jazz Collective	4/5 stars

Allmusic said "Dreamachines does vary widely in terms of style -- especially for a chamber group -- but Zorn is a magician when it comes to creating compositional, dynamic, and textural balances -- when he wants to be. And here, in using multiple styles and through careful strategic sequencing, he delivers an exciting sonic tapestry". Martin Schray stated "Dreamachines picks up Burroughs’ and Gysin’s innovative style, the absence of linear stories, the cut-up technique and their fascination for so-called routines and neologisms. Especially the cut-up technique has always been a crucial element of Zorn’s music (to the extreme in Naked City) which has always given a dramatic surprise to his compositions... Great album, indeed".

== Track listing ==
All compositions by John Zorn

1. "Psychic Conspirators" - 3:18
2. "Git-le-Coeur" - 4:26
3. "The Conqueror Worm" - 6:57
4. "The Third Mind" - 6:33
5. "Light Chapels" - 5:20
6. "The Dream Machine" - 5:57
7. "Note Virus" - 3:30
8. "1001 Nights in Marrakech" - 6:29
9. "The Wild Boys" - 3:25

== Personnel ==
- John Medeski - piano
- Kenny Wollesen - vibraphone
- Trevor Dunn - bass
- Joey Baron - drums

== Production ==
- Marc Urselli - engineer, audio mixer
- John Zorn and Kazunori Sugiyama – producers
