= The Prophecy: Live in Europe =

Live album by Painkiller
- Released: November 19, 2013
- Recorded: 2004–5 in Warsaw, Poland & Berlin, Germany
- Genre: Avant-garde jazz, grindcore, avant-garde metal
- Length: 69:55
- Label: Tzadik TZ 8311
- Producer: John Zorn

Painkiller chronology
50th Birthday Celebration Volume 12 (2005)	The Prophecy: Live in Europe (2013)

John Zorn chronology
@ (2013)	The Prophecy: Live in Europe (2013)	On the Torment of Saints, the Casting of Spells and the Evocation of Spirits (2013)

The Prophecy: Live in Europe is a live album by Painkiller, a band featuring John Zorn, Bill Laswell, and Yoshida Tatsuya, performing live in Berlin, Germany and Warsaw, Poland.

== Reception ==
Professional ratings
Review scores
Source	Rating
AllMusic	4/5 stars

The AllMusic review by Mark Deming awarded the album 4 stars stating "Appearing seven years after it was recorded and over ten years after the last proper Pain Killer album, it's not difficult to read The Prophecy as a summing up of Zorn and Laswell's experiment in fusing free jazz and extreme metal, and it ultimately turns out to be more than the sum of its parts, making it compelling listening."

== Track listing ==
All compositions by John Zorn, Bill Laswell and Yoshida Tatsuya

1. "Prelude" – 2:12
2. "The Prophecy" – 64:53
3. "Postlude" – 2:50

== Personnel ==
- John Zorn – alto saxophone
- Bill Laswell – bass guitar
- Yoshida Tatsuya – drums
