= @ (album) =

2013 improvisation jazz studio album by John Zorn and Thurston Moore

Studio album by John Zorn and Thurston Moore
- Released: September 24, 2013
- Recorded: February 2013
- Genre: Free jazz
- Length: 55:12
- Label: Tzadik
- Producer: John Zorn

John Zorn chronology
| Dreamachines (2013) | @ (2013) | The Prophecy: Live in Europe (2013) |

Thurston Moore chronology
| The Only Way to Go Is Straight Through (2013) | @ (2013) |

@ is a studio album by John Zorn and Thurston Moore. It is the first collaborative album by the duo and was recorded in New York City in February 2013 and released by Tzadik Records in September 2013. The album consists of improvised music by Zorn and Moore that was recorded in the studio in real time with no edits or overdubs.

== Reception ==
Professional ratings
Review scores
| Source | Rating |
|---|---|
| AllMusic | 3.5/5 stars |
| The Free Jazz Collective | 4.5/5 stars |

AllMusic said:

@ finds two of New York City's longest-running fringe dwellers churning out sheets of collaborative sounds that conjoin their respective and distinct states of constant freak-out...These seven improvisations sound inspired without feeling at all heavy-handed or urgent. More so, "@" succeeds with the type of conversational playing that could only be achieved by two masters so deep into their craft that it probably feels a lot like breathing to them by now.

— Thomas, F.

The Free Jazz Collective's Martin Schray called the album "absolutely fantastic". Writing shortly after the death of Lou Reed, he commented: "I guess Lou Reed would have liked this music if he had heard it, its abrasiveness, its harshness, its elegance, its sound, its diversity, its beauty."

A writer for The New Yorker described the album as "a spastic, free-jazz romp worthy of both their catalogues".

== Track listing ==
All compositions by John Zorn and Thurston Moore

1. "6th Floor Walk-Up, Waiting" – 12:25
2. "Jazz Laundromat" – 4:58
3. "Dawn Escape" – 9:39
4. "Her Sheets" – 4:19
5. "Soiled, Luscious" – 6:12
6. "Strange Neighbor" – 9:45
7. "For Derek and Evan" – 7:54

== Personnel ==
- John Zorn – alto saxophone
- Thurston Moore – electric guitars

== Sound ==
- Eric Elterman – engineer
- Marc Urselli – audio mixer
- John Zorn and Kazunori Sugiyama – producers
