= Live in Middelheim 1999 =

Live in Middleheim 1999

Live album by Masada
- Released: November 16, 1999
- Recorded: August 15, 1999 in Antwerp
- Genre: Downtown music Avant-garde jazz
- Length: 78:31
- Label: Tzadik TZ 7326
- Producer: John Zorn

Masada chronology
Live in Jerusalem 1994 (1999)	Live in Middleheim 1999 (1999)	Live in Sevilla 2000 (2000)

John Zorn chronology
Taboo & Exile (1999)	Live in Middleheim 1999 (1999)	Live in Sevilla 2000 (2000)

Live in Middelheim 1999 is a live album by John Zorn's Masada recorded in Antwerp, Belgium.

== Reception ==
The Allmusic review by Steve Loewy awarded the album 4½ stars stating "Every album by John Zorn's Masada seems better than the last, and this one is no exception. By the time of this recording the group was a tightly cohesive unit, performing at an extremely high and satisfying level... With a recording time nearing 80 minutes, and substantial contributions from the entire quartet, the recording marks not so much a milestone in the life of the group as a symbol of its ability to constantly expand upon itself and draw on its not inconsequential roots".

Professional ratings
Review scores
Source	Rating
Allmusic	4.5/5 stars

== Track listing ==
All compositions by John Zorn

1. "Nevuah" – 9:48
2. "Sippur" – 3:20
3. "Hath-Arob" – 5:20
4. "Kedushah" – 6:53
5. "Ne’eman" – 13:05
6. "Karet" – 2:03
7. "Kochot" – 4:57
8. "Piram" – 12:13
9. "Paran" – 6:00
10. "Ashnah" – 7:19
11. "Tahah" – 7:26

== Personnel ==
Masada

- John Zorn – saxophone
- Dave Douglas – trumpet
- Greg Cohen – bass
- Joey Baron – drums
