= More News for Lulu =

Live album by John Zorn/George Lewis/Bill Frisell
- Released: 1992
- Recorded: January 18 & 19, 1989
- Genre: Hard bop
- Length: 77:50
- Label: Hathut
- Producer: John Zorn

John Zorn chronology
Guts of a Virgin (1991)	More News for Lulu (1992)	Heretic (1992)

More News for Lulu is the second album of hard bop compositions performed by John Zorn, George Lewis, and Bill Frisell. Like the previous News for Lulu it features tunes by Kenny Dorham, Hank Mobley, Freddie Redd and Sonny Clark but also contains with one tune each by Misha Mengelberg and Big John Patton. The album was recorded live in Paris and Basel. It was released in 1992 on the Swiss Hathut Record label.

== Reception ==
Professional ratings
Review scores
Source	Rating
AllMusic	4.5/5 stars

The AllMusic review by Scott Yanow stated, "The music swings in its own fashion and, although it tugs at the boundaries of the bop tradition, it mostly stays within its borders. Bill Frisell, operating as the entire rhythm section, is a wonder as usual. Recommended".

== Track listing ==
1. "Blue Minor I" (Clark) - 6:04
2. "Hank's Other Tune" (Mobley) - 6:21
3. "News for Lulu" (Clark) - 5:26
4. "Gare Guillemins" (Mengelberg) - 3:47
5. "Minor Swing" (Patton) - 5:40
6. "KD's Motion/Windmill" (Dorham) - 5:02
7. "Funk in Deep Freeze" (Mobley) - 4:36
8. "Eastern Incident" (Clark) - 5:58
9. "Lotus Blossom" (Dorham) - 4:15
10. "Melanie" (Redd) - 6:40
11. "Ole" (Redd) - 5:01
12. "Blue Minor II" (Clark) - 5:04
13. "Peckin' Time" (Mobley) - 3:29
14. "Blues, Blues, Blues" (Redd) - 4:42
15. "Melody for C" (Clark) - 5:46

- Tracks 1–7 recorded live by Radio France at the Maison de la Radio, Paris on January 19, 1989. Tracks 8–15 recorded live by Peter Pfister at Stadttheater Basel, Switzerland on January 18, 1989

== Personnel ==
- John Zorn - alto saxophone
- George Lewis - trombone
- Bill Frisell - guitar
