= Taboo & Exile =

Studio album by John Zorn
- Released: October 1999
- Recorded: February–June 1999
- Studios: Avatar, New York City
- Length: 60:00
- Label: Tzadik TZ 7325
- Producer: John Zorn

John Zorn chronology
The String Quartets (1999)	Taboo & Exile (1999)	Live in Middelheim 1999 (1999)

Taboo & Exile is an album by John Zorn. It is the second album to appear in Zorn's Music Romance Series following Music for Children (1998). Three of the tracks on this recording (Mayim, Zera'im, and Makkot) are from Zorn's Masada songbook.

== Reception ==
The AllMusic review by Stacia Proefrock awarded the album 3½ stars stating "This is not a piece of classical movements; rather, it is like a film with constantly changing scenes. Before the end of the album, images are evoked of slow, metered tribal ritual, escape on an open road, cabaret, desert and dance. This is one of Zorn's most complex and beautiful pieces, showing that he is still constantly evolving as a composer."

Professional ratings
Review scores
Source	Rating
AllMusic	3.5/5 stars

== Track listing ==
All compositions by John Zorn

1. "In the Temple of Hadjarim" – 5:15
2. "Sacrifist" – 4:52
3. "Mayim" – 3:28
4. "Koryojang" – 6:23
5. "Bulls Eye" – 1:12
6. "Zera'im" – 6:19
7. "Thaalapalassi" – 10:28
8. "Makkot" – 3:01
9. "A Tiki for Blue" – 7:01
10. "The Possessed" – 6:22
11. "Oracle" – 4:31
12. "Koryojang (End Credits)" – 2:26

== Personnel ==
- Cyro Baptista – percussion
- Joey Baron – drums
- Sim Cain – drums
- Greg Cohen – contrabass
- Mark Feldman – violin
- Erik Friedlander – cello
- Fred Frith – guitar
- Miho Hatori – voice
- Bill Laswell – bass
- Dave Lombardo – drums
- Mike Patton – voice
- Robert Quine – guitar
- Marc Ribot – guitar
- Roberto Rodriguez – percussion
- Jamie Saft – keyboards
- Chris Wood – bass
- John Zorn – saxophone
