= Masada: Yod =

Studio album by John Zorn
- Released: 1998
- Recorded: September 15, 1997
- Genre: Jazz
- Length: 61:32
- Label: DIW DIW 935
- Producer: John Zorn and Kazunori Sugiyama

Masada chronology
Masada: Tet (1997)	Masada: Yod (1998)	Live in Jerusalem 1994 (1999)

John Zorn chronology
Downtown Lullaby (1998)	Masada: Yod (1998)	Aporias: Requia for Piano and Orchestra (1998)

Masada: Yod, also known as י or Masada 10, is a 1998 album by American composer and saxophonist John Zorn released on the Japanese DIW label. It is the tenth album of Masada recordings.

== Reception ==
Professional ratings
Review scores
Source	Rating
Allmusic	4/5 stars

The Allmusic review by Jim Smith awarded the album 4 stars stating "From its first manic blast, it's clear that Masada, Vol. 10: Yod is going to be one of John Zorn and company's wildest, most confident works... What continues to impress in this, their tenth release, is the group's relentless energy and the sheer brilliance of their interplay".

== Track listing ==
All compositions by John Zorn.

1. "Ruach" – 4:07
2. "Kilayim" – 3:22
3. "Taltalim" – 6:46
4. "Hashmal" – 3:23
5. "Tevel" – 5:49
6. "Segulah" – 5:32
7. "Yechida" – 7:49
8. "Tzalim" – 3:21
9. "Nashim" – 4:39
10. "Abrakala" – 14:28
11. "Zevul" – 2:16
- Recorded at Avatar, New York City on September 15, 1997

== Personnel ==
- John Zorn – alto saxophone
- Dave Douglas – trumpet
- Greg Cohen – bass
- Joey Baron – drums
