= On the Torment of Saints, the Casting of Spells and the Evocation of Spirits =

Studio album by John Zorn
- Released: November 19, 2013
- Recorded: March & July 2013 at East Side Sound, NYC and the Museum of Contemporary Art, Chicago
- Genre: Avant-garde, Contemporary classical music
- Length: 35:22
- Label: Tzadik TZ 9003
- Producer: John Zorn

John Zorn chronology
The Prophecy: Live in Europe (2013)	On the Torment of Saints, the Casting of Spells and the Evocation of Spirits (2013)	Shir Hashirim (2013)

On the Torment of Saints, the Casting of Spells and the Evocation of Spirits is an album of contemporary classical music by John Zorn, written in 2012, recorded in New York City in March & July 2013, and released on the Tzadik label in November 2013. The album features compositions inspired by William Shakespeare, Halloween and Anthony the Great and the cover art features paintings by Salvador Dalí, Goya and Michelangelo.

== Track listing ==
All compositions by John Zorn

1. "The Tempest" - 11:20
2. "All Hallows Eve: i Matins" - 9:29
3. "All Hallows Eve: ii Lauds" - 4:09
4. "All Hallows Eve: iii Vespers" - 1:37
5. "The Temptations of St. Anthony" - 8:46

== Personnel ==
=== Track One ===
International Contemporary Ensemble:

- Claire Chase - flute
- Joshua Rubin - clarinet, bass clarinet
- Nathan Davis - drums, percussion

=== Tracks Two to Four ===
- Chris Otto - violin
- David Fulmer - viola
- Jay Campbell - cello

=== Track Five ===
Fifth House Ensemble:

- Melissa Snoza - flute
- Crystal Hall - English horn
- Jennifer Woodrum - clarinet
- Karl Rzasa - bassoon
- Matt Monroe - French horn
- Jani Parsons - piano
- Andrew Williams - violin
- Clark Carruth - viola
- Herine Coetzee Koschak - cello
- Eric Snoza - bass

== Production ==
- Marc Urselli (tracks 1–4), Bill Maylone (track 5) - engineer, audio mixer
- Scott Hull - mastering
- John Zorn and Kazunori Sugiyama – producers
- Caleb Burhans - session producer, The Temptations of St. Anthony
