= Live in Sevilla 2000 =

Live album by Masada
- Released: July 25, 2000
- Recorded: 2000
- Genre: Avant-garde jazz
- Length: 79:02
- Label: Tzadik
- Producer: John Zorn, Kazunori Sugiyama

Masada chronology
Live in Middleheim 1999 (1999)	Live in Sevilla 2000 (2000)	Live at Tonic 2001 (2001)

John Zorn chronology
Live in Middleheim 1999 (1999)	Live in Sevilla 2000 (2000)	Xu Feng (2001)

Live in Sevilla 2000 is a live album by Masada recorded in Seville, Spain.

== Reception ==
The AllMusic review by Sean Westergaard awarded the album 5 stars stating "This might also be the best recorded of the live Masada releases, making it a real jewel in an already glittering discography. Live in Sevilla proves that Masada is one of the most exciting jazz ensembles in the world, bar none".

Professional ratings
Review scores
Source	Rating
AllMusic	5/5 stars
The Penguin Guide to Jazz Recordings	3.5/4 stars

== Track listing ==
All compositions by John Zorn

1. "Ne’eman" – 13:00
2. "Katzatz" – 5:09
3. "Hadasha" – 11:11
4. "Beeroth" – 7:30
5. "Shamor" – 10:09 - misidentified as "Yoreh" on album sleeve
6. "Hazor" – 6:47
7. "Nashon" – 10:11
8. "Lakom" – 5:24
9. "Bith Aneth" – 9:35

- Recorded live at Teatro Central, Seville (Spain) on March 18, 2000

== Personnel ==
Masada

- John Zorn – saxophone
- Dave Douglas – trumpet
- Greg Cohen – bass
- Joey Baron – drums
