= Elegy (John Zorn album) =

Studio album by John Zorn
- Released: 1992
- Recorded: November 1991, Different Fur Studios, San Francisco
- Length: 29:22
- Label: Eva, Tzadik TZ 7302
- Producer: John Zorn

John Zorn chronology
| Grand Guignol (1992) | Elegy (1992) | Leng Tch'e (1992) |

Elegy is the sixth studio album by John Zorn, which was dedicated to Jean Genet, featuring four "file card" compositions titled after colors and arranged in the style of chamber music.

== Reception ==
Professional ratings
Review scores
| Source | Rating |
|---|---|
| Allmusic | 4.5/5 stars |
| Guy's Music Review | 6.5/10 stars |
| The Penguin Guide to Jazz | 2.5/4 stars |

The Allmusic review by Blake Butler awarded the album 4½ stars describing it as "Another smeared blossoming testament to the off-color and highly obtuse genius of John Zorn. A mostly minimalist and sparse landscape of sheer terror and spine-ripping controlled noise explosion". Guy Peters stated "some moments come close to chamber music, but others employ the cut up-techniques or seem to function as an imaginary soundtrack. Another option is that you consider it an experiment in aural terror and not because it's a very alienating, extreme or demanding album throughout, but because it skilfully uses mood and shifts to hook you up with a feeling of unease".

== Track listing ==
1. "Blue" - 7:08
2. "Yellow" - 2:48
3. "Pink" - 15:44
4. "Black" - 3:42

All compositions by John Zorn

- Recorded at Different Fur Studios, San Francisco in November 1991

== Personnel ==
- Barbara Chaffe - alto flute, bass flute
- David Abel - viola
- Scummy - guitar
- David Shea - turntables
- David Slusser - sound effects
- William Winant - percussion
- Mike Patton - vocals
