= Painkiller (band) =

American band

PainKiller
- Also known as: Pain Killer (1991)
- Origin: New York City
- Genres: Avant-garde jazz, experimental rock, grindcore, avant-garde metal
- Years active: 1991–1995, 1997–1998, 2003, 2004–2006, 2008, 2024–present
- Labels: Earache, Tzadik
- Members: John Zorn; Bill Laswell; Mick Harris
- Past members: Hamid Drake; Yoshida Tatsuya

Painkiller (stylized as PainKiller, previously known as Pain Killer) is an avant-garde jazz and grindcore band that formed in 1991. Later albums incorporated elements of ambient and dub.

The three primary members of Painkiller were John Zorn on saxophone, Bill Laswell on bass guitar and Mick Harris on drums. Zorn and Laswell work in the New York avant-garde jazz music scene. Harris was the drummer for the grindcore band Napalm Death. Harris' blast beats inspired Zorn to create his signature style, forming improvisational groups like Naked City that merged disparate genres into a unique scene. Several musicians have made guest appearances both live and in the studio, including Buckethead, Kevin Sharp of Brutal Truth, Yamatsuka Eye, Mike Patton, Koichi Makigami of Hikashu, Justin Broadrick and G. C. Green of Godflesh, Fred Frith, and Keiji Haino of Fushitsusha.

Harris left the band in 1995 to dedicate himself to electronic music. Zorn and Laswell resurrected Painkiller and played with Yoshida Tatsuya of Ruins on drums. Hamid Drake joined the band for Zorn's 50th Birthday shows at Tonic in New York City. That show (which also featured Patton as a guest) was released as a live album by Tzadik.

On June 23, 2008, Painkiller performed Their Last Show In Citè de la musique Paris, France with the original line-up of Zorn, Laswell, and Harris, along with an appearance by Fred Frith and Patton.

In early 2024 the band reunited again, though with Harris on electronics and effects rather than a conventional drum kit. They announced the release of a new album, Samsara, in November 2024.

== Band members ==
=== Current lineup ===
- John Zorn – saxophone, vocals (1991–1995, 1997–1998, 2003, 2004–2006, 2008, 2024–present)
- Bill Laswell – bass guitar (1991–1995, 1997–1998, 2003, 2004–2006, 2008, 2024–present), samples (1994)
- Mick Harris – drums, vocals (1991–1995, 1997–1998, 2008, 2024–present), electronics, effects (1994, 2024–present)

=== Former members ===
- Hamid Drake – drums (2003)
- Tatsuya Yoshida – drums, vocals (2004–2006)

=== Guest/session musicians ===
- Justin Broadrick – guitar, drum machine, vocals (1991) (on Buried Secrets (1992), tracks "Buried Secrets", "The Toll")
- G.C. Green – bass (1991) (on Buried Secrets (1992), tracks "Buried Secrets", "The Toll")
- Keiji Haino – guitar, vocals (1991) (on Rituals: Live in Japan (1993), tracks "Vapors of Phlegm and Blood", "Tetragrammaton", "Cat's Cradle", "Demonic Possession", "Tokyo Lucky Hole"; on Collected Works (1998), track "Marianne")
- Koichi Makigami – vocals (1991) (on Collected Works (1998), track "Marianne")
- Buckethead – guitar (1993)
- Kevin Sharp – vocals (1993)
- Yamatsuka Eye – vocals (1995) (on Live in Osaka (1995) (Execution Ground Japanese bonus CD), tracks "Bodkyithangga", "Black Bile / Yellow Bile / Blue Bile / Crimson Bile / Ivory Bile")
- Mike Patton – vocals (2003, 2008) (on 50th Birthday Celebration Volume 12 (2005))
- Fred Frith – guitar (2008)

== Discography ==
- Guts of a Virgin (Earache, 1991)
- Buried Secrets (Earache, 1992)
- Rituals: Live in Japan (Toy's Factory, 1993)
- Execution Ground (Subharmonic, 1994)
- Talisman: Live in Nagoya (Tzadik, 2002)
- 50th Birthday Celebration Volume 12 with Hamid Drake and Mike Patton (Tzadik, 2005)
- The Prophecy: Live in Europe with Yoshida Tatsuya (Tzadik, 2013)
- Samsara (Tzadik, 2024)
- The Equinox (Tzadik, 2025)
- The Great God Pan (Tzadik, 2025)

=== Compilations ===
- Collected Works (Tzadik, 1998)
- Guts of a Virgin & Buried Secrets (Earache, 1998)
