= Mysterium (John Zorn album) =

Studio album by John Zorn
- Released: October 18, 2005
- Genre: Avant-garde, Contemporary classical music
- Length: 32:33
- Label: Tzadik
- Producer: John Zorn

John Zorn chronology
| 50th Birthday Celebration Volume 12 (2005) | Mysterium (2005) | Electric Masada: At the Mountains of Madness (2005) |

Mysterium is an album of contemporary classical music by New York avant-garde composer John Zorn.

== Reception ==
The Allmusic review by Stewart Mason awarded the album 3½ stars calling it "A mature and often excellent collection from a man still too often thought of as merely a free jazz noisemaker, Mysterium is well worth the time it requires".

Professional ratings
Review scores
| Source | Rating |
|---|---|
| Allmusic | 3.5/5 stars |

== Track listing ==
All compositions by John Zorn.

1. "Orphée" - 9:14
2. "Frammenti del Sappho" - 13:37
3. "Walpurgisnacht: Part 1" - 2:52
4. "Walpurgisnacht: Part 2" - 5:11
5. "Walpurgisnacht: Part 3" - 1:53

== Personnel ==
- Tara O'Connor – flute
- Lois Martin – viola
- June Han – harp
- Ikue Mori – electronics
- Lisa Bielawa – voice
- Martha Cluver – voice
- Abby Fischer – voice
- Kirsten Sollek – voice
- Martha Sullivan – voice
- Jennifer Choi – violin
- Fred Sherry – cello
- Stephen Gosling – celeste, harpsichord
- Richard O'Neill – viola
- David Shively – percussion
- Brad Lubman – conductor
