= 50th Birthday Celebration Volume 12 =

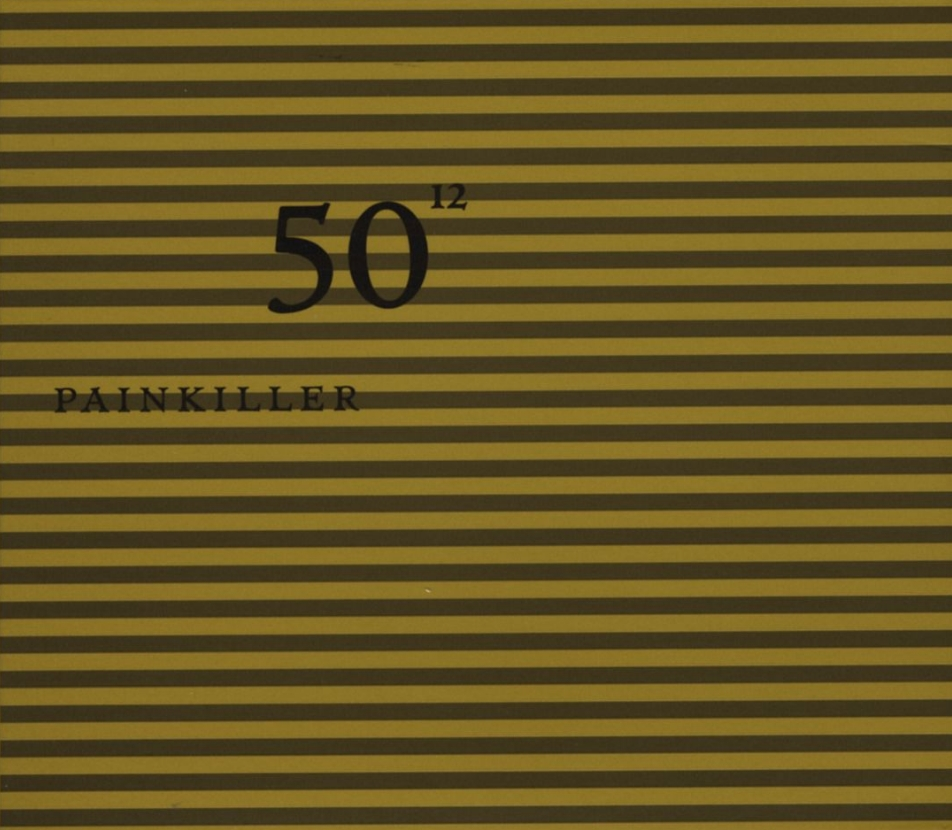

Live album by Painkiller
- Released: September 20, 2005
- Recorded: September 6, 2003
- Length: 43:16
- Label: Tzadik
- Producer: John Zorn

Painkiller chronology
Talisman: Live in Nagoya (2002)	50th Birthday Celebration Volume 12 (2005)	The Prophecy: Live in Europe (2013)

John Zorn chronology
50th Birthday Celebration Volume 11 (2005)	50th Birthday Celebration Volume 12 (2005)	Mysterium (2005)

50th Birthday Celebration Volume 12 is a live album by Painkiller documenting their performance at Tonic in September 2003 as part of John Zorn's month-long 50th Birthday Celebration concert series.

== Reception ==
The AllMusic review by Thom Jurek awarded the album 3½ stars stating "Zorn is out front playing snake-wise, melding everything from hard bop, free jazz, soul-oriented groove lines, and his own unclassifiable sonic palette. Patton's vocals are heavily treated yowls and screams combined with rhythmic breath work and moans. Tape delays are employed here as well, making the entire set a compelling, singular workout that is exciting, harsh, intense, and compelling."

Professional ratings
Review scores
Source	Rating
Allmusic	3.5/5 stars

== Track listing ==
All tracks are written by John Zorn.

No.	Title	Length
1.	"Your Inviolable Freedoms"	20:29
2.	"DPM"	16:24
3.	"Prophethood of Chaos"	6:23

== Personnel ==
- John Zorn – alto saxophone
- Bill Laswell – bass
- Hamid Drake – drums
- Mike Patton – voice
