= Aporias: Requia for Piano and Orchestra =

Studio album by John Zorn
- Released: September 15, 1998
- Genre: Avant-garde, contemporary classical music
- Length: 33:18
- Label: Tzadik TZ 7037
- Producer: John Zorn

John Zorn chronology
Masada: Yod (1998)	Aporias: Requia for Piano and Orchestra (1998)	The Bribe (1998)

Aporias: Requia for Piano and Orchestra is an album of contemporary classical music by American composer and saxophonist/multi-instrumentalist John Zorn performed by Stephen Drury, the Hungarian Radio Children's Choir and the American Composers Orchestra.

== Reception ==
Professional ratings
Review scores
Source	Rating
Allmusic	3.5/5 stars

The Allmusic review by Joslyn Layne awarded the album 3½ stars stating "the first three sections of this modern orchestral work are elusive, a crinoline fog of overtones emanating from various parts of the orchestra, be it the string section, or the boy sopranos of the Hungarian radio children's choir. The immediate opening lures you in with a few familiar quotes, but soon the composition heads into otherworldly passages, with an exploratory treatment," for, with "a range of bass drums, Eastern percussion hints, and interjections of orchestral warm-up moments," the "composition slips by in the shadows, remaining obscured even while enunciating.".

== Track listing ==
All compositions by John Zorn.

1. "Prelude" - 6:40
2. "Impetuoso" 3:31
3. "Con Mistero" - 2:58
4. "Languendo" - 2:33
5. "Risentito" - 2:50
6. "Freddamente" - 2:33
7. "Religioso" - 2:04
8. "Drammatico" - 4:52
9. "Postlude" 4:21
10. "Coda" - 0:49

== Personnel ==
- Stephen Drury – piano
- American Composers Orchestra conducted by Dennis Russell Davies
- Hungarian Radio Children's Choir
