= The String Quartets =

Studio album by John Zorn
- Released: July 20, 1999
- Recorded: December 1998; January, April and May, 1999 at Avatar in New York City
- Genres: Avant-garde, contemporary classical music
- Length: 64:26
- Label: Tzadik TZ 7047
- Producer: John Zorn

John Zorn chronology
Godard/Spillane (1999)	The String Quartets (1999)	Taboo & Exile (1999)

The String Quartets is an album of contemporary classical music by American composer and saxophonist/multi-instrumentalist John Zorn performed by Mark Feldman, Erik Friedlander, Joyce Hammann and Lois Martin. The piece Kol Nidre is a tune from Zorn's Masada songbook.

== Reception ==
The Allmusic review by Joslyn Layne awarded the album 4 stars stating "Maybe Zorn's genius isn't that he creates entirely unique music, but he certainly has an ear for great musical ideas, gleaned from his years of deep listening. And so, while these compositions may not be landmarks among string quartet works, they are exceedingly well done".

Professional ratings
Review scores
Source	Rating
Allmusic	4/5 stars

== Track listing ==
All compositions by John Zorn.

1. "Cat O'Nine Tails" – 13:44
2. "The Dead Man" – 12:27
3. "Memento Mori" – 28:57
4. "Kol Nidre" – 8:32

== Personnel ==
- Mark Feldman – violin
- Erik Friedlander – cello
- Joyce Hammann – violin
- Lois Martin – viola
