= News for Lulu =

Studio album by John Zorn/George Lewis/Bill Frisell
- Released: 1988
- Recorded: August 28 & 30, 1987
- Genre: Hard bop
- Length: 72:42
- Label: HatHut
- Producer: John Zorn

John Zorn chronology
Spillane (1987)	News for Lulu (1988)	Spy vs Spy (1989)

2008 Reissue Cover

News for Lulu is an album of hard bop compositions performed by saxophonist John Zorn, trombonist George Lewis and guitarist Bill Frisell.

Released in 1987, the album features tunes associated with the classic hard bop era of the 1950s and 1960s, written by Kenny Dorham, Hank Mobley, Freddie Redd and Sonny Clark. News for Lulu is primarily a studio recording, though live versions of three of the studio tracks are included at the end of the album. Though Zorn, Lewis and Frisell were mostly known at the time for playing experimental music, the hard bop songs are interpreted in a manner that's mostly faithful to the originals.

The original cover photograph features the actress Louise Brooks who played 'Lulu' in the silent film Pandora's Box (1929), evoking the song "News for Lulu" by Clark. It was released in 1988 on the Swiss HatHut Record label, and re-released in 1993 and again in 2008 with a new cover and additional take of "Melanie" recorded live at Jazzfestival Willisau on August 30, 1987.

The same group later released the recording More News for Lulu, which featured 1989 live performances drawn mostly from the same group of hard bop compositions.

== Reception ==
Professional ratings
Review scores
Source	Rating
AllMusic	5/5 stars
Stereo Review	sharp

Critical reception to the album was largely positive. The AllMusic review by Scott Yanow stated, "There are hints of the avant-garde here and there, but also plenty of swinging, bop-oriented solos and coherent ensembles. Very intriguing music that is highly recommended to a wide audience of jazz and general listeners".

All About Jazz reviewer Martin Longley observed, "These compositions all sound very familiar and this can’t be because they’re aired very often on the bebop stage. This has become an oft-visited disc in the collection, but its tunes surely deserve greater use as standards, either because they’re real hard bop classics or because they exist as prime distillations of archetypal bebop moves. It’s hard to tell which is which and why they sound so amazingly compulsive". Chris May of All About Jazz wrote: "It's a perfect blast on two levels—as a celebration of some great tunes and as platform for incisive collective improvisation".

Andrew Jones compared the unusual sax-guitar-trombone lineup to a group led by Jimmy Giuffre in the late 1950s, featuring the leader's sax and clarinets alongside valve trombonist Bob Brookmeyer and guitarist Jim Hall (see, e.g., Western Suite). Like Giuffre's group, Zorn's band for the Lulu sessions had no traditional rhythm section (drums, piano and/or bass), and as a result the three musicians found themselves sliding in and out of soloing and supporting roles depending on the song and arrangements, occasionally veering into experimental territory but mostly swinging and staying rooted in blues.

== Track listing ==
No.	Title	Writer(s)	Length
1.	"KD's Motion"	Dorham	3:32
2.	"Funk in Deep Freeze"	Mobley	4:31
3.	"Melanie"	Redd	4:07
4.	"Melody for C"	Clark	4:26
5.	"Lotus Blossom"	Dorham	4:08
6.	"Eastern Incident"	Clark	4:04
7.	"Peckin' Time"	Mobley	3:13
8.	"Blues Blues Blues"	Redd	4:17
9.	"Blue Minor take 1"	Clark	3:43
10.	"This I Dig of You"	Mobley	3:13
11.	"Venita's Dance l"	Dorham	3:23
12.	"News for Lulu"	Clark	4:07
13.	"Ole"	Redd	3:47
14.	"Sonny's Crib"	Clark	5:22
15.	"Hank's Other Tune"	Mobley	3:52
16.	"Blue Minor take 2"	Clark	3:26
17.	"Windmill"	Dorham	0:40
18.	"News for Lulu"	Clark	4:19
19.	"Funk in Deep Freeze"	Mobley	3:29
20.	"Windmill"	Dorham	1:03

- Tracks 1–17 recorded at Soundville Recording Studio Lucerne on August 28, 1987. Tracks 18–20 recorded live at Jazzfestival Willisau on August 30, 1987.

== Personnel ==
- John Zorn – alto saxophone
- George Lewis – trombone
- Bill Frisell – guitar
