= Filmworks 1986–1990 =

Soundtrack album by John Zorn
- Released: 1990 re-released 1997
- Recorded: June & December 1986, April 1987 and May, 1990
- Genre: avant-garde, jazz, classical
- Length: 68:37
- Label: Nonesuch Records, Tzadik
- Producer: John Zorn

John Zorn chronology
Torture Garden (1991)	Filmworks 1986–1990 (1990)	Guts of a Virgin (1991)

Filmworks chronology
Filmworks 1986-1990 (1990)	Filmworks II: Music for an Untitled Film by Walter Hill (1995)

Original Nonesuch Records Cover

Filmworks 1986–1990 features the first released film scores of John Zorn. The album was originally released on the Japanese labels Wave and Eva in 1990, on the Nonesuch Records label in 1992, and subsequently re-released on Zorn's own label, Tzadik Records, in 1997 after being out of print for several years.

"For Zorn, filmscores have always been a place to experiment, and the FilmWorks Series is in many ways a microcosm of his prodigious output. This original installment of the FilmWorks Series presents three scores ranging from punk-rockabilly (featuring the nasty guitars of Bob Quine, Bill Frisell and Arto Lindsay); a jazzy Bernard Herrmann fantasy; to a quirky classical/improv/world music amalgam for Raul Ruiz's bizarre film The Golden Boat. Zorn's infamous one-minute arrangement of Morricone's classic The Good, The Bad and The Ugly, is included as a bonus track. This is the place where it all began."

== Reception ==
Professional ratings
Review scores
Source	Rating
Allmusic	3/5 stars
Guy's Music Review	7/10 stars

The Allmusic review by Joslyn Layne awarded the album 3 stars stating "Although certainly a younger effort, there is a lot of good music on this first film works compilation. It is interesting to hear where Zorn's scores began". Guy Peters stated "With releases like this, Zorn was basically working outside the jazz-frame and experimenting with avant-garde compositions, but a lot of the music owes so much to jazz that his crossover tactics can be found at full-effect. Like all of his music that is laden with shifts, gimmicks, cut-up techniques and the complete lack of convention, this volume of Filmworks may strike one as too self-conscious and studied (as in the structured improvisation of the game pieces), but it also shows you a fearless musician and composer at work, willing to take risks and not afraid to fail once in a while. It's certainly not an easy listen".

== Track listing and liner notes ==
White and Lazy (1986) Director - Rob Schwebber

1. "Main Title" – 0:55
2. "Homecoming" - 1:15
3. "The Heist" - 3:20
4. "Meat Dream" - 1:50
5. "Phone Call" - 0:50
6. "End Title" - 1:59

Robert Quine - guitar
Arto Lindsay - guitar, vocals
Melvin Gibbs - bass
Anton Fier - drums
Carol Emanuel - harp
David Weinstein - keyboards
Ned Rothenberg - bass clarinet

Recorded and mixed June 1986 at Radio City Studios, New York City by Don Hünerberg.

The Golden Boat (1990) Director - Raúl Ruiz
07. "Fanfare" - 0:30
08. "Theme" - 2:59
09. "Jazz 1" - 2:51
10. "Horror Organ" - 1:06
11. "Mexico" - 1:56
12. "Mood" - 3:17
13. "Rockabilly" - 2:01
14. "Slow" - 2:47
15. "Jazz Oboes" - 2:33
16. "The Golden Boat (Turntable Mix)" - 2:58
17. "End Titles" - 2:53

Vicki Bodner - oboe
John Zorn - alto sax
Robert Quine - guitar
Anthony Coleman - keyboards
Carol Emanuel - harp
David Shae - turntable, vocals
Mark Dresser - bass
Ciro Baptista - Brazilian percussion
Robert Previte - drums, marimba

Recorded May 1990 at Platinum Island Studio, NY by Ricky Belt.
Mixed August 1990 at Science Lab, NYC by Jerry Gottus.

The Good, The Bad and The Ugly (1987)
18. "The Good, The Bad and The Ugly" - 1:04

Robert Quine - guitar
Bill Frisell - guitar
Fred Frith - bass
Wayne Horvitz - hammond organ
David Weinstein - keyboards
Carol Emanuel - harp
Robert Previte - drums, percussion, vocal

Recorded and mixed April 1987 at Radio City Studios, New York City by Don Hünerberg.

She Must Be Seeing Things (1986) Director - Sheila McLaughlin
19. "Main Title" - 1:04
20. "Swirling Shot" - 1:20
21. "Homecoming" - 3:22
22. "Catalina Flash" - 0:28
23. "Seduction" - 4:54
24. "Sex Shop Boogaloo" - 2:47
25. "Catalina Escapes" - 1:11
26. "Worms" - 1:04
27. "Death Waltz Fantasy" - 1:24
28. "Following Sequence" - 3:03
29. "Movie Set" - 1:20
30. "Climax" - 2:55
31. "Going To Dinner" - 2:38
32. "End Titles" - 3:27

Shelley Hirsch - voice
John Zorn - alto sax
Marty Ehrlich - tenor sax, clarinet
Tom Varner - French horn
Jim Staley - trombone
Bill Frisell - guitar
Carol Emanuel - harp
Anthony Coleman - piano, organ, celeste, harpsichord
Wayne Horvitz - hammond organ, piano, DX7
David Weinstein - mirage, CZ101 keyboards
David Hofstra - bass
Naná Vasconcelos - Brazilian percussion
Robert Previte - drums, percussion, vibes, timpani, orchestra bells

Recorded and mixed December 1986 at Radio City Studios, New York City by Don Hünerberg.

- All music composed, arranged and produced by John Zorn, except 18. "The Good, The Bad and The Ugly", composed by Ennio Morricone, and 16. "The Golden Boat (Turntable Mix)", mixed by David Shae.
- All music published by Theatre of Musical Optics (BMI), except 18. published by Unart Music (BMI).
- Executive Producer: John Zorn, Associate Producer: Kazunori Sugiyama
- Mastered by Bob Ludwig
- Design by Anthony Lee and Tanaka Tomoyo (Karath Razar)
- Notes by John Zorn
- Special thanks to Akashi Masanori, Kaoru, Azuma, Don Hünerberg, Scott MacAulay, Rob Schwebber, Sheila McLaughlin, Raul Ruiz, Bob Hurwitz and David Breskin.
- This recording is made possible in part through funding by Hip's Road.
