= Prelude, Op. 74, No. 2 (Scriabin) =

Alexander Scriabin's Prelude, Op. 74, No. 2, with marking Très lent, contemplatif (very slow, contemplating), is one of five preludes in Op. 74, composed in late 1914.

His second wife considered it his best piece. It was also his last, for Scriabin died soon after.

Leonid Sabaneyev cites the composer with the following words: "These quints are really creating a totally new sentiment, don't you think? [...] These harmonies are less resonant here, but look how highly psychologically difficult it has become. [...] Here reigns a blazing heat like in the [astral] desert. [...] and here again this longing urge [he played the chromatically descending melody line] [...] You know, this Prelude gives the impression as if it would last for centuries, even eternally, millions of years." - "The piece can be played in two ways. Either coloured by manifold nuances, or, quite the opposite, completely uniform, without the least shading. [...] in one single piece, there are multiple ones laid out, a multiplicity of the composition." - "Until now I always composed so that the interpretation of a piece was only possible in one way [...] Now I want it to be possible to be played in totally different ways, like a crystal can reflect totally different rays of light." - He said, quietly and hauntingly, "This is death! This is death as this emanation of the female which leads to unification [...] death and love [...] this is the abyss." This is not music", said [Sabaneev] to him, "this is something else..." - "This is the Mysterium," he said softly.
