= Cartoon S/M =

Cartoon/S&M

Studio album by John Zorn
- Released: October 24, 2000
- Recorded: April 8, 1998–February 22, 2000
- Genre: Avant-garde, contemporary classical music
- Length: 111:35
- Label: Tzadik TZ 7330
- Producer: John Zorn

John Zorn chronology
Xu Feng (1999)	Cartoon/S&M (2000)	Filmworks IX: Trembling Before G-d (2000)

Cartoon/S&M is a double album of contemporary classical music by American composer John Zorn. The piece Kol Nidre which appears in two versions on this recording is a tune from Zorn's Masada songbook.

== Reception ==
Professional ratings
Review scores
Source	Rating
Allmusic	4.5/5 stars

The Allmusic review by Thom Jurek awarded the album 4½ stars stating "This collection proves Zorn's astonishingly varied and sustaining contribution to late-century classical music. It should not only be owned, but studied, reflected upon for inspiration. Amazing".

== Track listing ==
All compositions by John Zorn.

- Disc One:
1. "Cat O’Nine Tails" - 15:35
2. "Carny" - 12:35
3. "For Your Eyes Only" - 15:02
4. "Kol Nidre" (string quartet) - 7:55
- Disc Two:
1. "The Dead Man" - 12:44
2. "Music for Children" - 14:29
3. "Memento Mori" - 26:28
4. "Kol Nidre" (clarinet quartet) - 6:47
- Recorded at Concertzaal, Tilburg on April 8, 1998 (Disc One track 3), and at Grasland Studios, Haarlem on November 8–13, 1999 (Disc One tracks 1 & 4, Disc Two tracks 1 & 3), February 21, 2000 (Disc One track 2), and February 22, 2000 (Disc Two tracks 2 & 4).

== Personnel ==
- Mondriaan Quartet
- Annette Bergman – viola
- Carl Fischer – score
- Ermo Hartsuiker – clarinet (Bass)
- Arnold Marinissen – percussion
- Tomoko Mukaiyama – piano
- Kazunori Sugiyama – associate producer
- Guido Tichelman – engineer
- Allan Tucker – mastering
- Jan-Erik Van Regteren Altena – violin, cello
- John Zorn – executive producer
