= Rituals: Live in Japan =

Live album by Painkiller
- Released: November 1993
- Recorded: September 26, 1991 at La Mama, Tokyo
- Genre: Avant-garde jazz, grindcore, avant-garde metal
- Length: 63:34
- Label: Toy's Factory
- Producer: Painkiller

Painkiller chronology
Buried Secrets (1992)	Rituals: Live in Japan (1993)	Execution Ground (1994)

John Zorn chronology
Kristallnacht (1993)	Rituals: Live in Japan (1993)	Radio (1993)

Rituals: Live in Japan is a live CD by Painkiller, a band featuring John Zorn, Bill Laswell, and Mick Harris, performing live in Tokyo in 1991 with guest guitar and vocals from Haino Keiji. The album was released on the Japanese label Toy's Factory in 1993.

It contains two performance "sets" by the band: "First Set" tracks 1–10 and "Second Set" tracks 11–17.

== Track listing ==
No.	Title	Length
1.	"Sound Check"	0:27
2.	"First Blood"	0:42
3.	"Five Doors"	0:37
4.	"Cinnabar"	2:40
5.	"Pestilence"	3:19
6.	"The Hex"	1:21
7.	"Snake Eyes"	3:38
8.	"Poisonous Visions"	7:13
9.	"Vapors of Phlegm and Blood"	9:22
10.	"Tetragrammaton"	6:25
11.	"Prophecy"	5:12
12.	"Tantric Bile"	0:18
13.	"The Sieve"	2:19
14.	"Abscesses"	7:29
15.	"Cat's Cradle"	6:42
16.	"Demonic Possession"	2:49
17.	"Tokyo Lucky Hole"	3:01

== Personnel ==
- John Zorn – alto saxophone, vocals
- Bill Laswell – bass
- Mick Harris – drums, vocals
- Haino Keiji – guitar, vocals (tracks 9, 10, 15, 16 and 17)

=== Technical personnel ===
- Recorded live on September 26, 1991, at La Mama, Tokyo
- Engineer – Makito Takashi
- Digital editing – Scott Hull
- Mastered by Howie Weinberg
