= Torture Garden (album) =

Compilation album by Naked City
- Released: November 1, 1990
- Recorded: 1989–1990 in Brooklyn, New York City, and Tokyo
- Genres: Jazzcore; grindcore; avant-garde metal
- Length: 25:46
- Labels: Shimmy Disc (US), Earache (UK), Toy's Factory (Japan)
- Producer: John Zorn

Naked City chronology
Naked City (1990)	Torture Garden (1990)	Grand Guignol (1992)

John Zorn chronology
Attention Span (1990)	Torture Garden (1990)	Filmworks 1986-1990 (1991)

Torture Garden is an album by John Zorn's Naked City with vocalist Yamatsuka Eye. The album collects the 42 "hardcore miniatures" recorded by the band. Nine of these short intense improvisations were spread across Naked City and the other 33 would feature on the next album, Grand Guignol. As Zorn explained in 1990:

Basically, this Naked City record (the first album on Nonesuch) came out, right. In the middle of it are about ten songs that are really short and hard. I said I wanted to do a record of 40 of those pieces, cause I was really interested in the compression and compactness of form that that music gets to. The guys at Nonesuch were not interested. If I wanted to do that, I better take it somewhere else. So what I managed to do was get them to bankroll the whole thing, and then I licensed it to Earache and Shimmy for basically no money and no royalties. So they are just putting this stuff out that Nonesuch bankrolled.

The tracks were re-released along with Leng Tch'e as Black Box in 1996 and in album sequence as part of Naked City: The Complete Studio Recordings in 2005.

The name for the collection comes from Le jardin des supplices, an 1899 Decadent novel by Octave Mirbeau.

== Reception ==
The AllMusic review by Bradley Torreano awarded the album four stars stating "Songs blur together but never get boring, no lyrics are actually sung, and few songs last longer than a minute. It also never takes itself seriously, a nice relief from Zorn's heavy-handed ambient collaborations. This would make a great introduction to the noise/jazz efforts that this group of musicians pioneered in the early 1990s."

Professional ratings
Review scores
Source	Rating
AllMusic	4/5 stars

== Track listing ==
All compositions by John Zorn and Yamatsuka Eye.

No.	Title	Length
1.	"Blood Is Thin"	1:00
2.	"Demon Sanctuary"	0:38
3.	"Thrash Jazz Assassin"	0:45
4.	"Dead Spot"	0:31
5.	"Bonehead"	0:51
6.	"Speedball"	0:17
7.	"Blood Duster"	0:13
8.	"Pile Driver"	0:33
9.	"Shangkuan Ling-Feng"	1:14
10.	"Numbskull"	0:29
11.	"Perfume of a Critic's Burning Flesh"	0:24
12.	"Jazz Snob Eat Shit"	0:24
13.	"The Prestidigitator"	0:43
14.	"No Reason to Believe"	0:26
15.	"Hellraiser"	0:39
16.	"Torture Garden"	0:35
17.	"Slan"	0:23
18.	"Hammerhead"	0:08
19.	"The Ways of Pain"	0:31
20.	"The Noose"	0:10
21.	"Sack of Shit"	0:43
22.	"Blunt Instrument"	0:54
23.	"Osaka Bondage"	1:14
24.	"Igneous Ejaculation"	0:20
25.	"Shallow Grave"	0:40
26.	"Ujaku"	0:27
27.	"Kaoru"	0:50
28.	"Dead Dread"	0:45
29.	"Billy Liar"	0:10
30.	"Victims of Torture"	0:23
31.	"Speedfreaks"	0:29
32.	"New Jersey Scum Swamp"	0:41
33.	"S & M Sniper"	0:14
34.	"Pigfucker"	0:23
35.	"Cairo Chop Shop"	0:23
36.	"Fuck the Facts"	0:11
37.	"Obeah Man"	0:17
38.	"Facelifter"	0:34
39.	"N.Y. Flat Top Box"	0:43
40.	"Whiplash"	0:19
41.	"The Blade"	0:36
42.	"Gob of Spit"	0:18

== Personnel ==
- John Zorn – alto saxophone, vocals
- Bill Frisell – guitar
- Wayne Horvitz – keyboards
- Fred Frith – bass
- Joey Baron – drums
- Yamatsuka Eye – vocals
