= Talisman: Live in Nagoya =

Live album by Painkiller
- Released: 26 November 2002
- Recorded: 24 November 1994
- Genre: Avant-garde jazz, grindcore, avant-garde metal
- Length: 48:09
- Label: Tzadik TZ 7342
- Producer: John Zorn

Painkiller chronology
Execution Ground (1994)	Talisman: Live in Nagoya (2002)	50th Birthday Celebration Volume 12 (2005)

John Zorn chronology
Filmworks XIII: Invitation to a Suicide (2002)	Talisman: Live in Nagoya (2002)	Masada Guitars (2003)

Talisman: Live in Nagoya is a live album by Painkiller, a band featuring John Zorn, Bill Laswell, and Mick Harris, performing live in Nagoya, Japan.

== Reception ==
Professional ratings
Review scores
Source	Rating
Allmusic	3/5 stars

The AllMusic review by François Couture awarded the album 3 stars stating "Pain Killer started out in 1991 as an incredibly brutal and exhilarating avant-core trio. It gradually turned into a free-dub unit with much less ideas per minute... As it is, it will appeal to fans of the Execution Ground era of the trio – and even then it makes an interesting addition but is by no means an essential item."

== Track listing ==
1. "Batrachophrenoboocosmomachia" – 31:55
2. "Transport Of Sorcerers" – 6:10
3. "Ahamkara" – 10:00

== Personnel ==
- John Zorn – alto saxophone, vocals
- Bill Laswell – bass
- Mick Harris – drums, vocals

Technical

- Oz Frith – recording engineer
- Scott Hull – mastering
- Chippy – design
- Heun-Heung Chin – design
- Tomoyo T.L. – design
