= Guts of a Virgin =

Studio album by Painkiller
- Released: October 1991
- Recorded: April 1991 at Greenpoint, Brooklyn
- Genre: Jazzcore, grindcore, avant-garde metal
- Length: 24:15
- Label: Toy's Factory; Earache
- Producer: John Zorn

Painkiller chronology
Guts of a Virgin (1991)	Buried Secrets (1992)

John Zorn chronology
Filmworks 1986-1990 (1991)	Guts of a Virgin (1991)	More News for Lulu (1992)

Professional ratings
Review scores
Source	Rating
AllMusic	3/5 stars
The Encyclopedia of Popular Music	3/5 stars
Spin Alternative Record Guide	5/10

Guts of a Virgin is the first album by American band Painkiller, a band featuring John Zorn, Bill Laswell and Mick Harris. It contains twelve tracks and was released in 1991 on Toy's Factory in Japan and Earache Records in England.

Harris later recalled the album was recorded during a three-hour session in New York City, and all the songs were entirely improvised and composed in the studio. This recording session also led to Harris's departure from Napalm Death, as working with Zorn and Laswell made him realize he wanted to explore different genres of music.

== Artwork ==
The first shipment of the album's cover art, which features a woman with her insides exposed, was censored, seized, and destroyed in the UK for violating the Obscene Publications Act.

== Critical reception ==
The Quietus called the album "intense but still something you could call 'rock.'" Trouser Press called it an "exposition of versatile thrash jazz," writing that "each instrument occupies its own sonic terrain, combining in a sprawl of unanticipated death metal."

== Track listing ==
No.	Title	Length
1.	"Scud Attack"	3:07
2.	"Deadly Obstacle Collage"	0:21
3.	"Damage to the Mask"	2:43
4.	"Guts of a Virgin"	1:19
5.	"Handjob"	0:10
6.	"Portent"	4:00
7.	"Hostage"	2:24
8.	"Lathe of God"	0:56
9.	"Dr. Phibes"	3:00
10.	"Purgatory of Fiery Vulvas"	0:26
11.	"Warhead"	1:12
12.	"Devil's Eye"	4:37

== Personnel ==
- John Zorn – alto saxophone, vocals
- Bill Laswell – bass
- Mick Harris – drums, vocals

Production

- Wes Naprstek – engineering
- Howie Weinberg – mastering
- Oz Fritz – mixing
- Lisa Wells – photography
- Tanaka Tomoyo, Anthony Lee – design

Publishing

- M.P.O – pressing
- Earache, Theater of Musical Optics, Nation Music – publishing
