= Buried Secrets (EP) =

Studio album by Painkiller
- Released: October 1992
- Recorded: August & October, 1991 at Greenpoint, Brooklyn
- Genre: Avant-garde jazz, grindcore, avant-garde metal
- Length: 26:24
- Label: Toy's Factory, Earache
- Producer: John Zorn

Painkiller chronology
Guts of a Virgin (1991)	Buried Secrets (1992)	Rituals: Live in Japan (1993)

John Zorn chronology
Heretic (1992)	Buried Secrets (1992)	Grand Guignol (1992)

Buried Secrets is the second album by American band Painkiller originally released by Toy's Factory in Japan and Earache in the UK, featuring guest appearances from Justin Broadrick and G. C. Green from Godflesh. Broadrick described the release as the result of various jams and improvisational sessions.

== Reception ==
Professional ratings
Review scores
Source	Rating
AllMusic	3/5 stars

The AllMusic review by Steve Huey states "Although this is experimental music, it works quite well — it's actually more sinister and menacing than many death metal groups. Very dark and very disturbing, 27 minutes is almost too much to handle."

== Track listing ==
No.	Title	Length
1.	"Tortured Souls"	1:52
2.	"One-Eyed Pessary"	1:50
3.	"Trailmarker"	0:03
4.	"Blackhole Dub"	3:29
5.	"Buried Secrets"	6:13
6.	"The Ladder"	0:22
7.	"Executioner"	2:48
8.	"Black Chamber"	2:28
9.	"Skinned"	0:54
10.	"The Toll"	7:26

== Personnel ==
- John Zorn – alto saxophone, vocals
- Bill Laswell – bass
- Mick Harris – drums, vocals
- Justin Broadrick – guitar, drum machine, vocals on "Buried Secrets" and "The Toll"
- G. C. Green – bass on "Buried Secrets" and "The Toll"
