= Execution Ground =

Studio album by Painkiller
- Released: November 15, 1994
- Recorded: June 1994 at Greenpoint Studio, Brooklyn, New York; November 1994
- Genre: Avant-garde jazz; avant-garde metal; dub; dark ambient
- Length: 83:56
- Label: Toy's Factory, Subharmonic
- Producer: John Zorn

Painkiller chronology
Rituals: Live in Japan (1993)	Execution Ground (1994)	Talisman: Live in Nagoya (2002)

John Zorn chronology
Absinthe (1993)	Execution Ground (1994)	Masada: Alef (1994)

Alternative cover

Professional ratings
Review scores
Source	Rating
AllMusic	4.5/5 stars
Spin Alternative Record Guide	5/10

Execution Ground is a double CD by Painkiller, a band featuring John Zorn, Bill Laswell, and Mick Harris.

== Reception ==
The AllMusic review by Maurice Rickard awarded the album 4½ stars, stating: "The first disc of this inventive and unsettling two-disc set features three long improvisations that show off the band's dub influence. The second disc, subtitled "Ambient Dub," is a rethinking/remix of the third and first improvs on the first disc. Overall less thrashy than some Painkiller excursions, the improvisations here are striking for their greater sonic space without sacrificing any of the heaviness. At times, the band rests, making way for ominous breathing and distant sustained screams, which recur throughout. The transitions from silence to groove to noise and back are relentless and dramatic. Harris proves to be an astonishingly inventive drummer, consistently varying the foundation in surprising ways. Laswell's tone varies from the brightness of flanged round-wound strings scraping the frets to a clean, menacing low-frequency pulse, and sticks mostly to elemental, non-flashy lines that keep the mood deep and dark. Zorn's playing is excellent here, varying between extremely overblown piercing tones (perhaps the best way of being heard over such a rhythm section) and nearly conventional jazzy lines that confidently ride atop the din."

The Quietus wrote that Painkiller "sought out the technics of the mixing desk to explore where they could really travel with their music. And the results are as exhilarating as they are daunting."

== Track listing ==
=== Disc 1 ===
1. "Parish of Tama (Ossuary Dub)" - 16:05
2. "Morning of Balachaturdasi" - 14:45
3. "Pashupatinath" - 13:47

=== Disc 2: Ambient ===
1. "Pashupatinath (Ambient)" - 20:00
2. "Parish of Tama (Ambient)" - 19:19

=== Japanese Bonus CD: Live in Osaka ===
1. "Gandhamanda" - 13:00
2. "Vaidurya" - 9:00
3. "Satapitaka" 11:00
4. "Bodkyithangga" - 13:00
5. "Black Bile/Yellow Bile/Blue Bile/Crimson Bile/Ivory Bile" - 8:35
- Recorded in November 1994 by Oz Fritz

== Personnel ==
- John Zorn – alto saxophone, vocals
- Bill Laswell – bass, samples
- Mick Harris – drums, samples, vocals
- Yamatsuka Eye – vocals (Tracks 4 and 5 on Live in Osaka)
