= Dave Douglas discography =

American jazz musician discography

This is the discography for American jazz musician Dave Douglas.

== As leader ==
Year	Title	Personnel		Label
1993	Parallel Worlds	String Group: Mark Feldman, Erik Friedlander, Mark Dresser, Michael Sarin		Soul Note
1994	The Tiny Bell Trio	Tiny Bell Trio: Brad Shepik and Jim Black		Songlines
1995	In Our Lifetime	Josh Roseman, Chris Speed, Uri Caine, James Genus, Joey Baron	Inspired by Booker Little	New World
1995	Constellations	Tiny Bell Trio		hatHUT
1996	Five	String Group		Soul Note
1997	Live in Europe	Tiny Bell Trio	Live album	Arabesque
1997	Sanctuary	Cuong Vu, Yuka Honda, Anthony Coleman, Mark Dresser, Hilliard Greene, Chris Speed, Dougie Bowne	Live album	Avant
1997	Stargazer	Chris Speed, Josh Roseman, Uri Caine, James Genus, Joey Baron	Inspired by Wayne Shorter	Arabesque
1998	Moving Portrait	Bill Carrothers, James Genus, Billy Hart	Inspired by Joni Mitchell	DIW
1998	Charms of the Night Sky	Charms of the Night Sky: Mark Feldman, Guy Klucevsek, Greg Cohen		Winter & Winter
1998	Magic Triangle	Chris Potter, James Genus, Ben Perowsky		Arabesque
1999	Convergence	String Group		Soul Note
1999	Songs for Wandering Souls	Tiny Bell Trio		Winter & Winter
2000	Soul on Soul	Chris Speed, Josh Roseman, Greg Tardy, Uri Caine, James Genus, Joey Baron	Inspired by Mary Lou Williams	RCA
2000	Leap of Faith	Chris Potter, James Genus, Ben Perowsky		Arabesque
2000	A Thousand Evenings	Charms of the Night Sky		RCA
2001	El Trilogy	Greg Cohen, Mark Feldman, Guy Klucevsek/Gregory Tardy, Susie Ibarra		BMG
2001	Witness	Chris Speed, Joe Daley, Mark Feldman, Erik Friedlander, Drew Gress, Bryan Carrott, Michael Sarin, Ikue Mori, Josh Roseman, Yuka Honda, Tom Waits		RCA
2002	The Infinite	Chris Potter, Uri Caine, James Genus, Clarence Penn		RCA
2003	Freak In	Seamus Blake, Chris Speed, Marc Ribot, Romero Lubambo, Jamie Saft, Craig Taborn, Brad Jones, Joey Baron, Michael Sarin Karsh Kale and Ikue Mori		Bluebird
2004	Strange Liberation	Chris Potter, Bill Frisell, Uri Caine, James Genus, Clarence Penn		RCA
2004	Bow River Falls	Louis Sclavis, Peggy Lee, Dylan van der Schyff		Koch
2005	Mountain Passages	Michael Moore, Marcus Rojas Peggy Lee, Dylan van der Schyff		Greenleaf Music
2005	Live at the Bimhuis Set 1 & 2	Rick Margitza, Uri Caine, James Genus, Clarence Penn	Live album	Greenleaf Music
2005	Keystone	Keystone: Marcus Strickland, Jamie Saft, DJ Olive, Brad Jones, Gene Lake	Inspired by Fatty Arbuckle	Greenleaf Music
2006	Meaning and Mystery	Donny McCaslin, Uri Caine, James Genus, Clarence Penn		Greenleaf Music
2006	Keystone: Live in Sweden	Keystone: omit Saft and add Adam Benjamin	Live album	Greenleaf Music
2007	Live at the Jazz Standard	Donny McCaslin, Uri Caine, James Genus, Clarence Penn	Live album also released as 12 set download	Greenleaf Music
2007	Moonshine	Keystone	Live album	Greenleaf Music
2008	Keystone: Live at Jazz Standard	Keystone	Live album released as 8 set download	Greenleaf Music
2009	Spirit Moves	Brass Ecstasy: Vincent Chancey, Luis Bonilla, Marcus Rojas, Nasheet Waits		Greenleaf Music
2009	A Single Sky	Frankfurt Radio Big Band conducted by Jim McNeely		Greenleaf Music
2010	Spark of Being	Keystone		Greenleaf Music
2011	United Front: Brass Ecstasy at Newport	Brass Ecstasy: Vincent Chancey, Luis Bonilla, Marcus Rojas, Nasheet Waits	Live album	Greenleaf Music
2011	Three Views	Brass Ecstasy; Ravi Coltrane, Vijay Iyer, Linda Oh, Marcus Gilmore; So Percussion	Compiles GPS Portable Series: Rare Metals, Orange Afternoons and Bad Mango	Greenleaf Music
2012	Be Still	Aoife O'Donovan, Jon Irabagon, Matt Mitchell, Linda May Han Oh, Rudy Royston		Greenleaf Music
2013	Time Travel	Jon Irabagon, Matt Mitchell, Linda May Han Oh, Rudy Royston		Greenleaf Music
2013	DD50: Special Edition 50th Birthday Recordings		Compiles Be Still & Time Travel with bonus album Pathways and DVD	Greenleaf Music
2014	Riverside	Co-led with Chet Doxas along with Steve Swallow, Jim Doxas	Inspired by Jimmy Guiffre	Greenleaf Music
2014	Present Joys	Duets with Uri Caine		Greenleaf Music
2015	Sound Prints	Co-led with Joe Lovano along with Lawrence Fields, Linda May Han Oh, Joey Baron	Live album	Blue Note
2015	High Risk	Shigeto, Jonathan Maron, Mark Guiliana		Greenleaf Music
2015	Brazen Heart	Jon Irabagon, Matt Mitchell, Linda May Han Oh, Rudy Royston		Greenleaf Music
2016	Dark Territory	Shigeto, Jonathan Maron, Mark Guiliana		Greenleaf Music
2016	Dada People	Frank Woeste, Matt Brewer, Clarence Penn		Greenleaf Music
2016	New Sanctuary Trio	Marc Ribot, Susie Ibarra	Subscriber-Exclusive Release	Greenleaf Music
2017	Serial Sessions 2015	Chet Doxas, Ryan Keberle, Frank Woeste, Linda May Han Oh, Rudy Royston	Subscriber-Exclusive Release	Greenleaf Music
2017	The New National Anthem	Co-led with Chet Doxas along with Steve Swallow, Jim Doxas	Inspired by Carla Bley	Greenleaf Music
2017	Brazen Heart Live at Jazz Standard - Saturday	Jon Irabagon, Matt Mitchell, Linda May Han Oh, Rudy Royston	Double live album	Greenleaf Music
2017	Little Giant Still Life	Riley Mulherkar, Zubin Hensler, Andy Clausen, Willem de Koch, Anwar Marshall		Greenleaf Music
2018	Brazen Heart Live at Jazz Standard - Friday	Jon Irabagon, Matt Mitchell, Linda May Han Oh, Rudy Royston	Double live album	Greenleaf Music
2018	Scandal	Co-led with Joe Lovano along with Lawrence Fields, Linda May Han Oh, Joey Baron		Greenleaf Music
2018	On Pebble Street	Co-led with Joe Lovano along with Lawrence Fields, Linda May Han Oh, Joey Baron	7" 45 RPM vinyl	Greenleaf Music
2018	Brazen Heart Live at Jazz Standard - Thursday	Jon Irabagon, Matt Mitchell, Linda May Han Oh, Rudy Royston	Double live album	Greenleaf Music
2018	Brazen Heart Live at Jazz Standard - Sunday	Jon Irabagon, Matt Mitchell, Linda May Han Oh, Rudy Royston	Double live album	Greenleaf Music
2018	Brazen Heart Live at Jazz Standard - Complete	Jon Irabagon, Matt Mitchell, Linda May Han Oh, Rudy Royston	Complete 8-CD set: Thursday, Friday, Saturday, Sunday	Greenleaf Music
2018	UPLIFT	Joe Lovano, Mary Halvorson, Julian Lage, Bill Laswell, Ian Chang	Subscriber-Exclusive Release	Greenleaf Music
2019	Showing Up / The Power of the Vote	Jeff Parker, Tomeka Reid, Anna Webber, Nick Dunston, Kate Gentile as well as Joe Lovano, Mary Halvorson, Julian Lage, Bill Laswell, Ian Chang	7" 33 RPM vinyl	Greenleaf Music
2019	Devotion	Trio with Uri Caine, Andrew Cyrille		Greenleaf Music
2019	ENGAGE	Jeff Parker, Tomeka Reid, Anna Webber, Nick Dunston, Kate Gentile	Subscriber-Exclusive Release	Greenleaf Music
2020	If There Are Mountains	Co-led with Elan Mehler along with Dominque Eade, John Gunther, Simón Willson, and Dayeon Seok	LP	Newvelle Records
2020	Dizzy Atmosphere: Dizzy Gillespie at Zero Gravity	Dave Adewumi, Matthew Stevens, Fabian Almazan, Carmen Rothwell, Joey Baron		Greenleaf Music
2020	Marching Music	Rafiq Bhatia, Melvin Gibbs, Sim Cain		Greenleaf Music
2020	Overcome	Fay Victor, Camila Meza, Ryan Keberle, Jorge Roeder, Rudy Royston		Greenleaf Music
2021	Other Worlds	Co-led with Joe Lovano along with Lawrence Fields, Linda May Han Oh, Joey Baron		Greenleaf Music
2026	Four Freedoms	Quartet with Marta Warelis (piano), Nick Dunston (bass), Joey Baron (drums)		Greenleaf Music

== As sidemusician ==
Album artist	Title	Year	Label
Second Sight	Flying With The Comet	1988	Sunjump
Second Sight	Tiger Tracks	2020	Sunjump
Jose Chalas	Living On Avenue F	1988	Sunjump
Vincent Herring	American Experience	1989	MusicMasters
New and Used	Souvenir	1991	Knitting Factory
Orange Then Blue	While You Were Out	1992	GM Recordings
The Band	Jericho	1993	Pyramid/Rhino
Don Byron	Don Byron Plays the Music of Mickey Katz	1993	Nonesuch
Franklin Kiermyer	In the House of My Fathers	1993	Konnex
Mark Dresser	Force Green	1994	Soul Note
Masada	Masada, Vol. 1: Alef	1994	DIW
Mosaic Sextet	Today, This Moment	1994	Konnex
Mark Dresser	The Cabinet of Dr. Caligari	1995	Knitting Factory
New and Used	Consensus	1995	Knitting Factory
Masada	Masada, Vol. 2: Beit	1995	DIW
Masada	Masada, Vol. 3: Gimel	1995	DIW
Steve Beresford	Signals for Tea	1995	Avant
Masada	Masada, Vol. 5: Hei	1995	DIW
Masada	Masada, Vol. 6: Vav	1995	DIW
Fontella Bass	No Ways Tired	1995	Nonesuch
Myra Melford	Even the Sounds Shine	1995	Hat ART
Fred Hersch	Point in Time	1995	Enja
Anthony Braxton & Mario Pavone	Seven Standards 1995	1995	Knitting Factory
John Zorn	Bar Kokhba	1996	Tzadik
Suzanne Vega	Nine Objects of Desire	1996	A&M
Myra Melford	The Same River, Twice	1996	Gramavision
Dave Douglas and Han Bennink	Serpentine	1996	Songlines
Sheryl Crow	Sheryl Crow	1996	A&M
Uri Caine	Toys	1996	Winter & Winter
John Zorn	Filmworks III: 1990-1995	1997	Tzadik
Marc Ribot	Shoe String Symphonettes	1997	Tzadik
Uri Caine	Urlicht / Primal Light	1997	Winter & Winter
François Houle & Dave Douglas	In the Vernacular: The Music of John Carter	1998	Songlines
Sean Lennon	Into the Sun	1998	Capitol
Masada	Masada, Vol. 7: Zayin	1998	DIW
Masada	Masada, Vol. 8: Het	1998	DIW
Masada	Masada, Vol. 9: Tet	1998	DIW
Masada	Masada, Vol. 10: Yod	1998	DIW
Patricia Barber	Modern Cool	1998	Premonition
What We Live	Quintet for a Day	1998	New World
Greg Cohen	Way Low	1998	DIW
Cibo Matto	Stereo ★ Type A	1999	Warner Bros.
Myra Melford	Above Blue	1999	Arabesque
Sean Lennon	Half Horse, Half Musician	1999	EMI
Masada	Masada, Vol. 4: Dalet	1999	DIW
Masada	Masada, Vol. 7: Zayin	1999	DIW
Masada	Live in Jerusalem 1994	1999	Tzadik
Masada	Live in Middleheim 1999	1999	Tzadik
Masada	Live in Taipei 1995	1999	Tzadik
Uri Caine	The Sidewalks of New York: Tin Pan Alley	1999	Winter & Winter
Masada	Live in Sevilla 2000	1999	Tzadik
What We Live	Trumpets	2000	Black Saint
Joe Lovano	Flights of Fancy: Trio Fascination Edition Two	2001	Blue Note
Misha Mengelberg Quartet	Four in One	2001	Blue Note
John Zorn	The Gift	2001	Tzadik
Masada	Live at Tonic 2001	2001	Tzadik
Mosaic Sextet	Mosaic Sextet	2001	GM Recordings
Brad Shepik Trio	Short Trip	2001	Knitting Factory
Masada	First Live 1993	2002	Tzadik
Patricia Barber	Verse	2002	Premonition
John Zorn	The Unknown Masada	2003	Tzadik
Masada	50th Birthday Celebration Volume 7	2004	Tzadik
Masada	Sanhedrin 1994-1997	2005	Tzadik
Martial Solal & Dave Douglas	Rue de Seine	2006	Sunnyside
Anthony Braxton	Six Standards (Quintet) 1996	2006	Splasc(h)
Kenny Werner	Lawn Chair Society	2007	Blue Note
Masada with Joe Lovano	Stolas: Book of Angels Volume 12	2009	Tzadik
