= Bar Kokhba Sextet =

New York jazz band

Bar Kokhba Sextet brings together six core members of Masada under the leadership of John Zorn. An improvisational group of New York's downtown artists, the sextet includes Cyro Baptista on percussion, Marc Ribot on guitar, Greg Cohen on bass, Joey Baron on drums, Mark Feldman on violin, and Erik Friedlander on cello. According to Tzadik, Zorn's music label, the band's music is "Sephardic exotica for young moderns".

The Bar Kokhba album, recorded from 1994 to 1996, started Zorn's transition into his second Masada Book, The Book of Angels.

== Discography ==
- Bar Kokhba (1996) 2CD
- The Circle Maker (1998, Disc 1 by Masada String Trio, Disc 2 by Bar Kokhba Sextet) 2CD
- 50th Birthday Celebration Volume 11 (2005)
- Lucifer: Book of Angels Volume 10 (2008)
