= 50th Birthday Celebration Volume 11 =

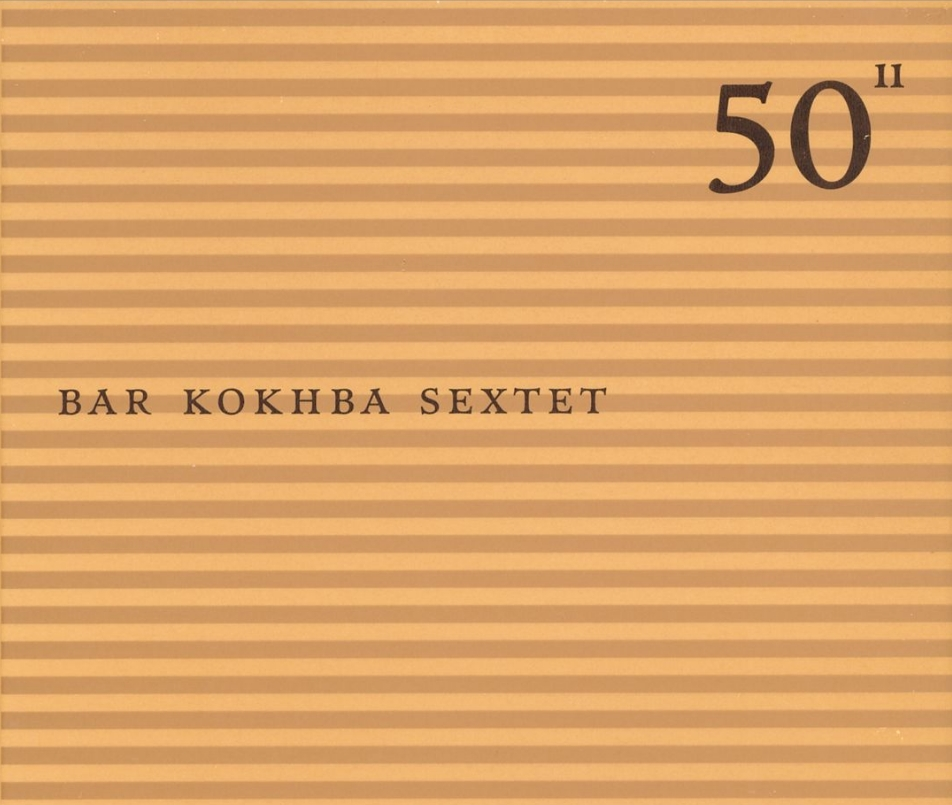

Live album by Electric Masada
- Released: July 26, 2005
- Recorded: September 12–13, 2003
- Genres: Downtown music Avant-garde jazz
- Length: 192:11
- Label: Tzadik
- Producer: John Zorn

Bar Kokhba Sextet chronology
The Circle Maker (1998)	50th Birthday Celebration Volume 11 (2005)	Lucifer: Book of Angels Volume 10 (2008)

John Zorn chronology
Masada Rock (2005)	50th Birthday Celebration Volume 11 (2005)	50th Birthday Celebration Volume 12 (2005)

50th Birthday Celebration Volume 11 is a triple live album by the Bar Kokhba Sextet documenting their performance at Tonic in September 2003 as part of John Zorn's month-long 50th Birthday Celebration.

== Reception ==
The Allmusic review awarded the album 3.5 stars.

Professional ratings
Review scores
Source	Rating
Allmusic	3.5/5 stars

== Track listing ==
All tracks are written by John Zorn.

Disc One (September 12, 2003: first set)
No.	Title	Length
1.	"Intro"	0:59
2.	"Lilin"	12:34
3.	"Ner Tamid"	4:42
4.	"Karet"	3:20
5.	"Yatzar"	9:59
6.	"Khebar"	5:43
7.	"Eitan"	2:01
8.	"Kivah"	9:52
9.	"Teli"	9:54

Disc Two (September 13, 2003: third set [first set of the second night])
No.	Title	Length
1.	"Intro"	0:49
2.	"Khebar"	5:22
3.	"Lachish"	3:12
4.	"Kisofim"	9:55
5.	"Jachin"	11:43
6.	"Kochot"	5:06
7.	"Hazor"	9:03
8.	"Avelut"	6:36
9.	"Lilin"	12:45

Disc Three (September 13, 2003: last set [second set of the second night])
No.	Title	Length
1.	"Intro"	0:52
2.	"Khebar"	6:14
3.	"Hadasha"	13:01
4.	"Hazor"	10:11
5.	"Eitan"	1:31
6.	"Karet"	3:37
7.	"Idalah Abal"	14:39
8.	"Teli"	9:06
9.	"Avelut"	7:02
10.	"Bith Aneth"	10:44

== Personnel ==
- Cyro Baptista – percussion
- Joey Baron – drums
- Greg Cohen – bass
- Erik Friedlander – cello
- Marc Ribot – guitar
- Mark Feldman – violin
- John Zorn – conductor
