= Masada (band) =

American jazz group

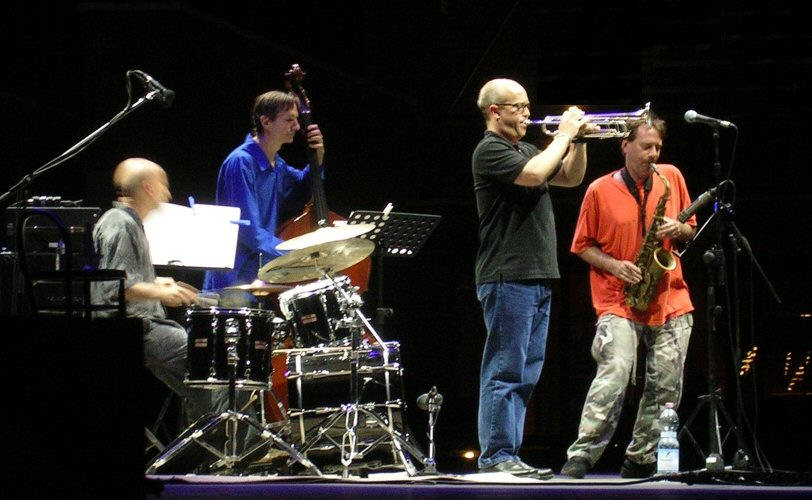
- Masada performing, c2005; L.-R. Joey Baron (dr), Greg Cohen (b), Dave Douglas (tr), John Zorn (sax)

Background information
- Genres: Klezmer experimental jazz
- Label: Tzadik
- Past members: John Zorn; Joey Baron; Greg Cohen; Dave Douglas

Masada is a musical group with rotating personnel led by American saxophonist and composer John Zorn since the early 1990s.

Masada was the first ensemble to perform Zorn's compositions inspired by Radical Jewish Culture and written to be performed by small groups of musicians. Initially envisioned as a set of 100 "songs" notated within a limited number of staves and confined to specific modes or scales, Zorn's Masada project would eventually total 613 compositions divided into three specific "books".

Zorn used Hebrew titles for these compositions along with melodic themes and musical structures reminiscent of klezmer music, and Jewish imagery on album covers to explore Jewish identity within the Masada songbook and groups. He stated: "The idea with Masada is to produce a sort of radical Jewish music, a new Jewish music which is not the traditional one in a different arrangement, but music for the Jews of today. The idea is to put Ornette Coleman and the Jewish scales together."

== History ==
In 1993 Zorn first worked with Dave Douglas (trumpet), Greg Cohen (double bass), and Joey Baron (drums) to provide musical cues for Joe Chappelle's first film Thieves Quartet (later collected on Filmworks III: 1990–1995) and established them as Masada to perform his recent compositions using the instrumental lineup and improvisational approach of Ornette Coleman's pioneering free jazz quartet.

From 1994 the group released ten studio albums on the Japanese DIW label, each titled after a letter of the Hebrew alphabet. Further releases by Masada on Tzadik highlighted live performances recorded in Jerusalem (1994), Taipei (1995), Middelheim (1999), Seville (2000) and in New York at the Knitting Factory (1993) and at Tonic (2001). The quartet released a live DVD in 1999, another recording from Zorn's 50th Birthday Celebration Series and a double CD of unreleased studio recordings, Sanhedrin 1994–1997 in 2005.

By the end of 2004, Zorn had composed over 300 new tunes for the "second" Masada songbook. Some of the new tunes were debuted at Tonic in December 2004, as a mini festival. Tzadik has released a series of CDs of these songs played by various ensembles, including the Masada String Trio, Marc Ribot, Koby Israelite, Erik Friedlander and others as the "Masada Book 2: The Book of Angels" collection.

As of early 2007, according to the Tzadik website, "Together for close to fifteen years, John Zorn's Masada Quartet is officially breaking up and will be performing two of their last live concerts ever at Lincoln Center March 9th and 10th on a double bill with Cecil Taylor's New AHA 3." Nevertheless, they were scheduled to perform as the original quartet on a concert in Antwerp in Cultural Center Luchtbal on June 22, 2008 - the bill later changed with the addition of pianist Uri Caine, who performed with them the entire set, except for one song. Baron, Cohen and Douglas also joined the duo of Mike Patton and John Zorn the evening before, at the same venue, and the quartet also performed one song as an encore.

The quartet performed together at Yoshi's San Francisco jazz club on March 12, 2008. The 8pm show featured music from the original Masada songbook and the 10pm performance featured songs from Masada Book 2: The Book of Angels.

== Related projects ==
Since the mid-1990s a number of new projects have arisen under the Masada banner.

=== Masada String Trio ===
The Masada String Trio performs selections from the Masada songbook in a classical-chamber jazz form. Personnel include Mark Feldman (violin), Erik Friedlander (cello), and Cohen (bass). With the addition of Marc Ribot (guitar), Cyro Baptista (percussion) and Joey Baron (drums), this same group has performed as the "Bar Kokhba Sextet".

The performing style of both groups is characterised by the use of improvisation (sometimes conducted by Zorn himself) and its use of the inflections of Jewish music that are part of the compositional language of Zorn's "Masada" themes.

=== Bar Kokhba ===
Two different projects in the Masada family share this name. Prior to the creation of the Bar Kokhba Sextet, the Bar Kokhba album was released, featuring a cast of regular Zorn collaborators performing Masada material in a variety of different small ensemble configurations.

=== Electric Masada ===
One of Zorn's most active Masada projects of recent years is Electric Masada. Drawing on Zorn's wide-ranging stylistic influences, the band takes the Masada songbook into a whole new direction, reminiscent of jazz fusion and noise rock. The group, which includes Baron, Ribot, Wollesen, and Cyro Baptista, from previous Masada groups, as well as Trevor Dunn on bass, Jamie Saft on keyboards and Ikue Mori on laptop/electronics, continue to take the Masada themes and transform them into something entirely new.

Zorn uses hand signals to conduct the band, allowing for him to make up different arrangements on the spot. During Zorn's 50th Birthday Celebration at Tonic in September 2003, Electric Masada was recorded live. Released in May 2004, 50th Birthday Celebration Volume 4 became the group's first official recording. This was followed by At the Mountains of Madness recorded in 2004 in Moscow and Ljubljana.

=== New Masada Quartet ===
In 2019, Zorn formed the New Masada Quartet with Julian Lage (guitar), Jorge Roeder (bass), and Kenny Wollesen (drums).

== 10th Anniversary ==
2003 saw the 10th Anniversary of Masada and Tzadik released five new CD sets in commemoration. The first release, Masada Guitars, has three guitarists, Bill Frisell, Marc Ribot and Tim Sparks, playing the tunes, mainly acoustically. Volume 2, Voices in the Wilderness, has a huge range of groups and individuals playing and Volume 3, The Unknown Masada, has yet more new groups, together with some familiar faces playing Masada tunes never before performed in public. A fourth volume, Masada Recital, performed by Sylvie Courvoisier on piano and Mark Feldman on violin, followed in 2004. The fifth and final volume Masada Rock features the band Rashanim and was released in August 2005.

== Masada Book 2: The Book of Angels ==
From 2003 Zorn has written a range of new Masada compositions which have been released on a series of albums under the banner of Masada Book 2: The Book of Angels. Musicians contributing to the series include Jamie Saft, Masada String Trio, Mark Feldman and Sylvie Courvoisier, Koby Israelite, The Cracow Klezmer Band, Uri Caine, Marc Ribot, Erik Friedlander, the Secret Chiefs 3 the Bar Kokhba Sextet, Medeski Martin & Wood, Pat Metheny, 'The Spike Orchestra' (a big band) arranged by Sam Eastmond & Nikki Franklin, and most recently in 2016, Flaga (a piano trio)

== Masada Book 3: The Book Beriah ==
On March 19, 2014, the first 20 compositions of a third Masada book were performed live at The Town Hall in New York. The total number of compositions in the third book is 92, which brings the total number of Masada compositions at 613, the same as the number of mitsvah or commandments in the Torah. Musical group compositions range from loud avant-garde rock to string quartet.

== Discography ==
=== Masada ===
Studio Recordings

- Masada: Alef (DIW, 1994)
- Masada: Beit (DIW, 1994)
- Masada: Gimel (DIW, 1994)
- Masada: Dalet (DIW, 1994)
- Masada: Hei (DIW, 1995)
- Masada: Vav (DIW, 1995)
- Masada: Zayin (DIW, 1996)
- Masada: Het (DIW, 1996)
- Masada: Tet (DIW, 1997)
- Masada: Yod (DIW, 1997)
- Sanhedrin 1994-1997 (Unreleased Studio Recordings) (Tzadik, 2005)

Live Recordings

- First Live 1993 (Tzadik, 2002)
- Live in Jerusalem 1994 (Tzadik, 1997)
- Live in Taipei 1995 (Tzadik, 1997)
- Live in Middelheim 1999 (Tzadik, 1999)
- Live in Sevilla 2000 (Tzadik, 2000)
- Live at Tonic 2001 (Tzadik, 2001)
- 50th Birthday Celebration Volume 7 (Tzadik, 2004)

=== Masada String Trio ===
- John Zorn, Bar Kokhba (Tzadik, 1996)
- John Zorn, The Circle Maker - Disc 1: "Issachar" (Tzadik, 1998)
- John Zorn, Filmworks XI: Secret Lives (Tzadik, 2002)
- Masada String Trio, 50th Birthday Celebration Volume 1 (Tzadik, 2004)
- Masada String Trio, Azazel: Book of Angels Volume 2 (Tzadik, 2005)
- John Zorn, Filmworks XX: Sholem Aleichem - with Rob Burger and Carol Emmanuel (Tzadik, 2008)
- Masada String Trio, Haborym: Book of Angels Volume 16 (Tzadik, 2010)

=== Bar Kokbha ===
- John Zorn, Bar Kokhba (Tzadik, 1996)
- John Zorn, The Circle Maker - Disc 2: "Zevulun" (Tzadik, 1998)
- Bar Kokhba Sextet, 50th Birthday Celebration Volume 11: (Tzadik, 2005)
- Bar Kokhba Sextet, Lucifer: Book of Angels Volume 10 (Tzadik, 2008)

=== Electric Masada ===
- 50th Birthday Celebration Volume 4 (Tzadik, 2004)
- Electric Masada: At the Mountains of Madness (Tzadik, 2005)

=== New Masada Quartet ===
- New Masada Quartet (Tzadik, 2021)

=== Anniversary Series ===
- Masada Anniversary Edition Vol. 1: Masada Guitars (Tzadik, 2003)
- Masada Anniversary Edition Vol. 2: Voices in the Wilderness (Tzadik, 2003)
- Masada Anniversary Edition Vol. 3: The Unknown Masada (Tzadik, 2003)
- Masada Anniversary Edition Vol. 4: Masada Recital (Tzadik, 2004)
- Masada Anniversary Edition Vol. 5: Masada Rock (Tzadik, 2005)

=== Book 2: The Book of Angels ===
- Astaroth: Book of Angels Volume 1 by The Jamie Saft Trio (Tzadik, 2005)
- Azazel: Book of Angels Volume 2 by Masada String Trio (Tzadik, 2005)
- Malphas: Book of Angels Volume 3 by Mark Feldman and Sylvie Courvoisier (Tzadik, 2006)
- Orobas: Book of Angels Volume 4 by Koby Israelite (Tzadik, 2006)
- Balan: Book of Angels Volume 5 by The Cracow Klezmer Band (Tzadik, 2006)
- Moloch: Book of Angels Volume 6 by Uri Caine (Tzadik, 2006)
- Asmodeus: Book of Angels Volume 7 by Marc Ribot (Tzadik, 2007)
- Volac: Book of Angels Volume 8 by Erik Friedlander (Tzadik, 2007)
- Xaphan: Book of Angels Volume 9 by Secret Chiefs 3 (Tzadik, 2008)
- Lucifer: Book of Angels Volume 10 by Bar Kokhba (Tzadik, 2008)
- Zaebos: Book of Angels Volume 11 by Medeski Martin & Wood (Tzadik, 2008)
- Stolas: Book of Angels Volume 12 by Masada Quintet featuring Joe Lovano (Tzadik, 2009)
- Mycale: Book of Angels Volume 13 by Mycale (Tzadik, 2010)
- Ipos: Book of Angels Volume 14 by The Dreamers (Tzadik, 2010)
- Baal: Book of Angels Volume 15 by The Ben Goldberg Quartet (Tzadik, 2010)
- Haborym: Book of Angels Volume 16 by Masada String Trio (Tzadik, 2010)
- Caym: Book of Angels Volume 17 by Banquet of the Spirits (Tzadik, 2011)
- Pruflas: Book of Angels Volume 18 by David Krakauer (Tzadik, 2011)
- Abraxas: Book of Angels Volume 19 by Shanir Ezra Blumenkranz (Tzadik, 2012)
- Tap: Book of Angels Volume 20 by Pat Metheny (Tzadik/Nonesuch, 2013)
- Alastor: Book of Angels Volume 21 by Eyvind Kang (Tzadik, 2014)
- Adramelech: Book of Angels Volume 22 by Zion80 (Tzadik, 2014)
- Aguares: Book Of Angels Volume 23 by Roberto Rodriguez (Tzadik, 2014)
- Amon: Book Of Angels Volume 24 by Klezmerson (Tzadik, 2015)
- Gomory: Book Of Angels Volume 25 by Mycale (Tzadik, 2015)
- Cerberus: Book of Angels Volume 26 by The Spike Orchestra (Tzadik, 2015)
- Flaga: Book of Angels Volume 27 by Flaga (Tzadik, 2016)
- Andras: Book of Angels Volume 28 by Nova Express Quintet (Tzadik, 2016)
- Flauros: Book of Angels Volume 29 by AutorYno (Tzadik, 2016)
- Leonard: Book of Angels Volume 30 by Garth Knox & the Saltarello Trio (Tzadik, 2016)
- Buer: Book of Angels Volume 31 by Brian Marsella Trio (Tzadik, 2017)
- Paimon: Book of Angels Volume 32 by Mary Halvorson (Tzadik, 2017)
