= Live in Taipei 1995 =

Live album by Masada
- Released: October 1998
- Recorded: 1995
- Genre: Downtown music Avant-garde jazz
- Length: 146:36
- Label: Tzadik TZ 7323
- Producer: John Zorn

Masada chronology
Live in Jerusalem 1994 (1999)	Live in Taipei 1995 (1998)	Live in Middelheim 1999 (1999)

John Zorn chronology
The Bribe (1998)	Live in Taipai 1995 (1998)	Music for Children (1998)

Live in Taipei is a double live album by John Zorn's Masada recorded at the Crown Theatre in Taiwan's capital city Taipei. The album is mistakenly dated 1995, while the performance actually took place in 1996.

== Reception ==
The Allmusic review by Joclyn Layne awarded the album 3½ stars stating "With so many exceptional recordings available of the Masada quartet, this one may be considered less necessary, but it's still necessary for most fans ".

Professional ratings
Review scores
Source	Rating
Allmusic	3.5/5 stars
The Penguin Guide to Jazz	3.5/4 stars

== Track listing ==
- Disc one
1. "Gevurah" – 12:38
2. "Achshaph" – 2:41
3. "Mahshav" – 7:09
4. "Shebuah" – 12:06
5. "Shilhim" – 2:45
6. "Idalah-Abal" – 8:24
7. "Mikreh" – 10:45
8. "Yoreh" – 7:42
9. "Tekufah" – 9:16
- Disc two
1. "Debir" – 9:17
2. "Sheloshim" – 8:11
3. "Katzatz" – 2:47
4. "Hadasha" – 11:21
5. "Lachish" – 2:25
6. "Midbar" – 9:08
7. "Evel" – 5:45
8. "Hafla-ah" – 6:34
9. "Racheb" – 7:08
10. "Ziphim" – 10:20

== Personnel ==
- John Zorn – saxophone
- Dave Douglas – trumpet
- Greg Cohen – bass
- Joey Baron – drums
