= The Unknown Masada =

Studio album by John Zorn
- Released: June 22, 2003
- Recorded: January–May, 2003
- Genre: Jazz, klezmer
- Length: 59:30
- Label: Tzadik TZ 7181
- Producer: John Zorn

John Zorn chronology
Voices in the Wilderness (2003)	The Unknown Masada (2003)	Buck Jam Tonic (2003)

Masada Anniversary chronology
Voices in the Wilderness (2003)	The Unknown Masada (2003)	Masada Recital (2004)

Masada Anniversary Edition Volume 3: The Unknown Masada is the third album in a series of five releases celebrating the 10th anniversary of John Zorn's Masada songbook project. It features twelve previously unreleased Masada compositions performed by Erik Friedlander's Quake (1), Rashanim (2), Dave Douglas (3), Tatsuya Yoshida (4), Naftule's Dream (5), Jamie Saft (6), Zahava Seewald (7), Koby Israelite (8), Julian Kytasty (9); Fantômas (10), Wadada Leo Smith and Ikue Mori (11), and Eyvind Kang (12).

== Reception ==
Professional ratings
Review scores
Source	Rating
Allmusic	3/5 stars
Pitchfork Media	7.4/10 stars
The Penguin Guide to Jazz Recordings	3/4 stars

Allmusic critic Sean Westergaard wrote "... there is a tremendous amount of stylistic diversity here, from the very traditional sound of Julian Kytasty to the very untraditional sounds of Fantômas. In fact, listeners more familiar with The Circle Maker or Bar Kokhba might not be prepared for some of the hard rock treatments of some of these tunes... The Zorn crowd tends to follow his every move and usually know what to expect; the uninitiated should probably approach this one with some caution."

Dominique Leone was positive about the disc as a whole, writing: "...for the most part Zorn's music has yet again proved to withstand the test of time and interpretation. If Masada does indeed go down as his greatest moment, it will be in part because other musicians have run with his ideas and been able to make their own artistic marks with his music. In that sense, The Unknown Masada and the other anniversary series albums are as significant as any release in his canon."

== Track listing ==
1. "Kinyan" (arr. Erik Friedlander) – 4:50
2. "Olamim" (arr. Rashanim) – 3:48
3. "Vehuel" (arr. Dave Douglas) – 5:32
4. "Shofetim" (arr. Yoshida Tatsuya) – 3:02
5. "Partzuf" (arr. Michael McLaughlin) – 4:22
6. "Zarach" (arr. Jamie Saft) – 6:57
7. "Shagal" (arr. by Seewald, Grebil, Florizoone) – 6:46
8. "Herem" (arr. Koby Israelite) – 5:06
9. "Kadmut" (arr. by Julian Kytasty) – 4:44
10. "Zemaraim" (arr. Trevor Dunn) – 3:34
11. "Demai" (arr. by Smith, Mori) – 6:22
12. "Belimah" (arr. Eyvind Kang) – 4:09

== Personnel ==
- Erik Friedlander (1) – cello, mandolin
- Andy Laster (1) – saxophone, clarinet
- Satoshi Takeishi (1) – percussion
- Stomu Takeishi (1) – bass
- Jon Madof (2) – guitar
- Shanir Ezra Blumenkranz (2) – bass
- Mathias Kunzli (2) – drums, percussion
- Dave Douglas (3) – trumpet, Fender Rhodes
- Greg Tardy (3) – tenor
- John Zorn (3) – alto
- Greg Cohen (3) – bass
- Ben Perowsky (3) – drums
- Yoshida Tatsuya (4) – all instruments, voice
- Glenn Dickson (5) – clarinet
- Gary Bohan (5) – trumpet
- Brandon Seabrook (5) – guitar
- Michael McLaughlin (5) – piano
- Jim Gray (5) – tuba
- Eric Rosenthal (5) – drums
- Jamie Saft (6) – all instruments
- Zahava Seewald (7) – vocals
- Micjael Grebil (7) – oud, medieval fiddle, ceterina d'amore
- Tuur Florizoone (7) – accordion
- Solomon ibn Gabirol (7) – text
- Koby Israelite (8) – drums, percussion, accordion, guitars, keys, clarinet, vocals
- Yaron Stavi (8) – bass, guitar
- Sid Gauld (8) – flugelhorn
- John Telfer (8) – baritone saxophone
- Julian Kytasty (9) – bandura
- Mike Patton (10) – voice, electronics
- Buzz Osborne (10) – guitar
- Trevor Dunn (10) – bass
- Dave Lombardo (10) – drums
- Wadada Leo Smith (11) – trumpet
- Ikue Mori (11) – laptop electronics
- Eyvind Kang (12) – all instruments
