= Music for Children (album) =

Studio album by John Zorn
- Released: October 1998
- Genre: Avant-garde
- Length: 49:11
- Label: Tzadik TZ 7321
- Producer: John Zorn

John Zorn chronology
The Bribe (1998)	Music for Children (1998)	Live in Jerusalem 1994 (1999)

Music for Children is the first release in John Zorn's Music Romance Series and features three Naked City compositions (written at the time of Torture Garden) performed by Zorn with the band Prelapse; a 20-minute composition for wind machines and controlled feedback systems dedicated to Edgard Varèse, and a classical chamber music piece for violin, percussion, and piano performed by the Abel-Steinberg-Winant Trio framed by a poly-rhythmic etude for percussion and celeste and a lullaby for music box.

== Reception ==
Professional ratings
Review scores
Source	Rating
AllMusic	4/5 stars

The AllMusic review by Stacia Proefrock awarded the album 4 stars out of 5, stating, "The adventurous parents who actually play this music for their child may be horrified to discover how much the little baby genius actually likes it. For those who are childless or simply less brave, this volume provides fascinating candy for adult ears."

== Track listing ==
All compositions by John Zorn

1. "Fils des Etoiles" – 2:16
2. "This Way Out" – 1:10
3. "Music for Children" – 14:17
4. "Bikini Atoll" – 0:46
5. "Bone Crusher" – 0:38
6. "Dreamer of Dreams" – 5:48
7. "Cycles du Nord" – 20:54
8. "Sooki’s Lullaby" – 3:17

== Personnel ==
- Prelapse
- David Abel – violin
- Cyro Baptista – percussion, vocals
- Greg Cohen – bass
- Anthony Coleman – celeste, music box
- Erik Friedlander – cello
- Jeff Hudgins – alto saxophone
- Dane Johnson – guitar
- Alex Lacamoire – keyboards
- Lou Reed – guitar (only in 10th anniversary edition)
- Marc Ribot – guitar
- Andy Sanesi – drums
- Julie Steinberg – piano
- Gwendolyn Wendell – bass, vocals
- William Winant – percussion
- John Zorn – alto saxophone, wind machines, acoustic feedback systems
