= 50th Birthday Celebration Volume One =

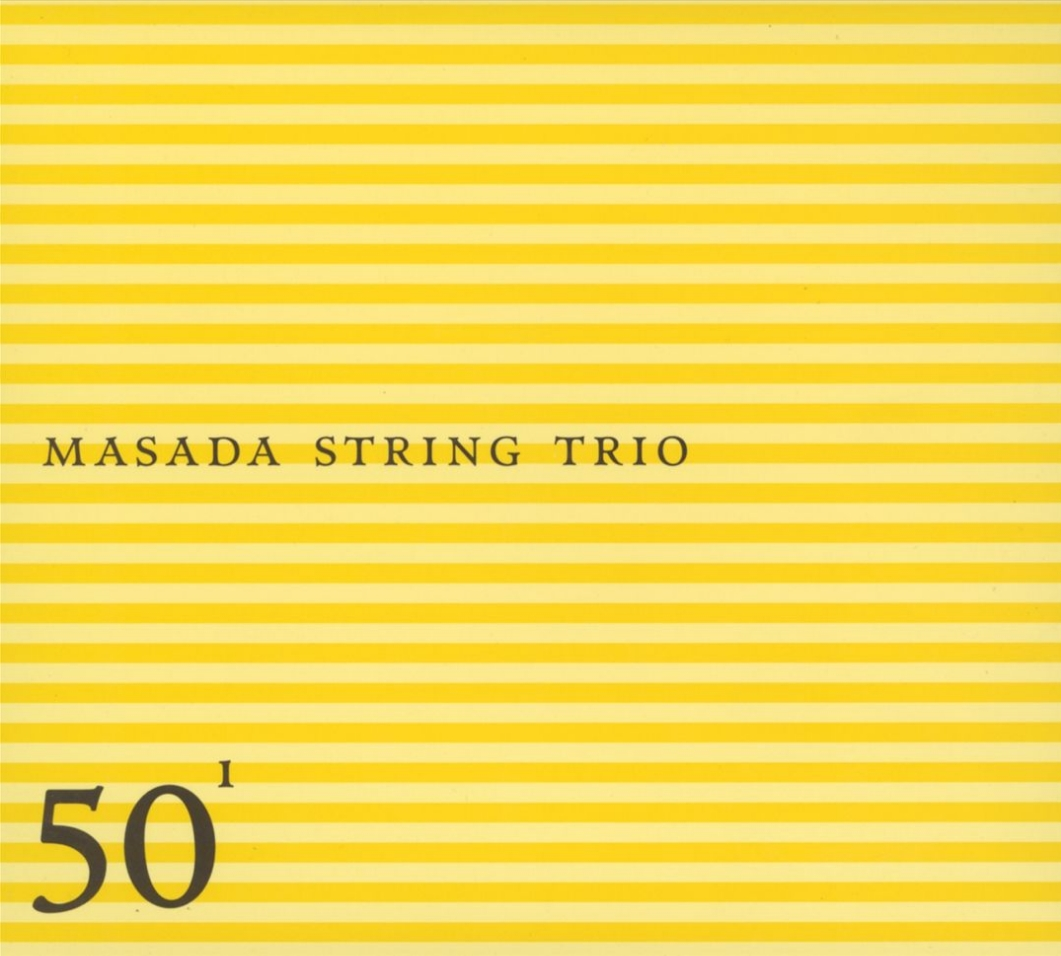

Live album by Masada String Trio
- Released: February 24, 2004
- Recorded: September 3, 2003
- Genres: Downtown music, avant-garde jazz, klezmer
- Length: 63:03
- Labels: Tzadik; TZ 5001
- Producer: John Zorn

Masada String Trio chronology
Filmworks XI: Secret Lives (2002)	50th Birthday Celebration Volume One (2004)	Azazel: Book of Angels Volume 2 (2005)

John Zorn chronology
Filmworks XIV: Hiding and Seeking (2003)	50th Birthday Celebration Volume One (2004)	50th Birthday Celebration Volume 2 (2004)

50th Birthday Celebration Volume One is a live album by the Masada String Trio documenting their performance at Tonic in September 2003 as part of John Zorn's month-long 50th Birthday Celebration concert series.

== Critical reception ==
Professional ratings
Review scores
Source	Rating
AllMusic	4.5/5 stars

The AllMusic review by Sean Westergaard awarded the album 4.5 stars stating "From soloing to comping, bowing to pizzicato techniques, the set is dazzling from start to finish. Only "Malkut" and "Karet" are anything but beautiful, sounding like pieces left more open to free improvisation than the others, and allowing other facets of the players' abilities to come out. The Masada songbook has elicited a rather large number of truly excellent recordings from its various ensembles. Add this one to the list. Recommended."

== Track listing ==
All tracks are written by John Zorn.

No.	Title	Length
1.	"Tahah"	7:53
2.	"Abidan"	5:25
3.	"Lachish"	3:29
4.	"Sippur"	3:27
5.	"Malkhut*"	5:02
6.	"Meholalot"	6:30
7.	"Kedushah"	8:31
8.	"Ner Tamid"	3:37
9.	"Karet"	4:12
10.	"Moshav"	8:07
11.	"Khebar"	6:50

- *misspelled as "Malkut" on album sleeve

== Personnel ==
=== Masada String Trio ===
- John Zorn – conductor
  - Mark Feldman – violin
  - Erik Friedlander – cello
  - Greg Cohen – bass

=== Technical personnel ===
- John Zorn – producer
  - Kazunori Sugiyama – co-producer
- Daniel Goldaracena – recording engineer
- Scott Hull – mastering engineer
- Chippy, Heung-Heung Chin – design
