= A Bookshelf on Top of the Sky: 12 Stories About John Zorn =

- Directed by: Claudia Heuermann
- Produced by: Claudia Heuermann
- Starring: John Zorn
- Music by: John Zorn
- Release date: April 6, 2004
- Language: English

A Bookshelf on Top of the Sky: 12 Stories About John Zorn is a documentary film on avant garde composer and musician John Zorn directed by Claudia Heuermann. It features performances of a range of Zorn's music and includes appearances by Joey Baron, Greg Cohen, Dave Douglas, Fred Frith, Ikue Mori, Mike Patton, and Marc Ribot. It won the Bavarian Documentary Award in 2002.
