= 50th Birthday Celebration Volume Two =

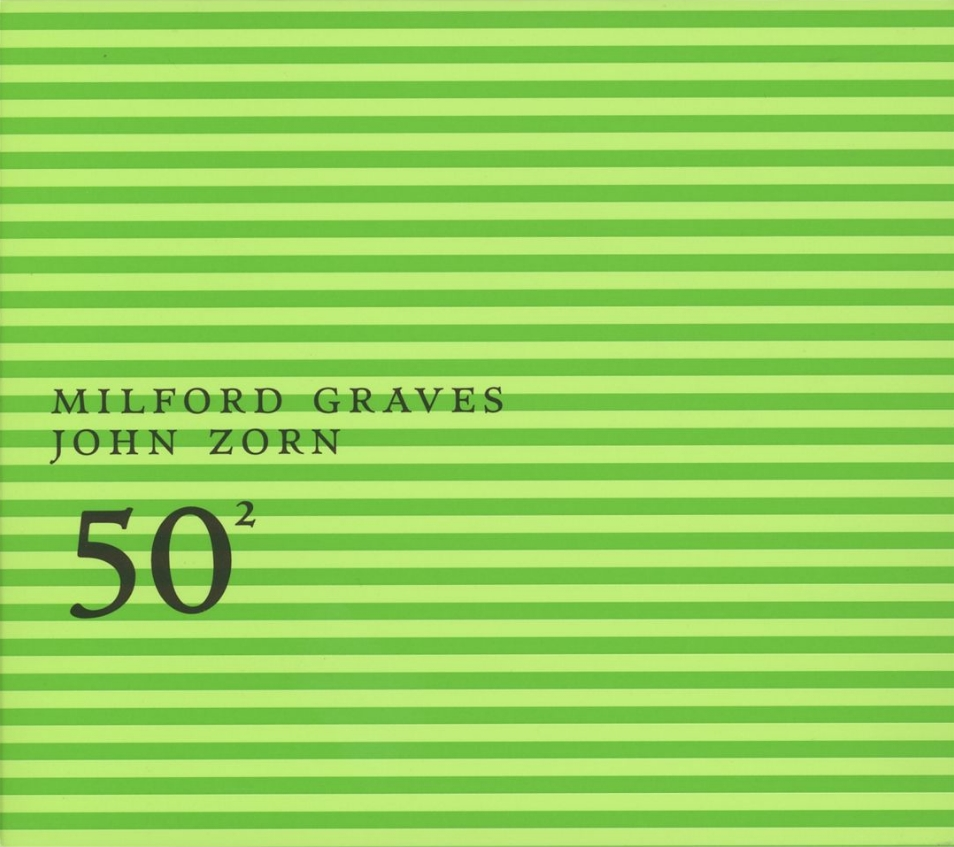

Live album by Milford Graves & John Zorn
- Released: March 23, 2004
- Recorded: October 8, 2003
- Genre: Downtown music, avant-garde jazz
- Length: 54:17
- Label: Tzadik; TZ 5002
- Producer: John Zorn

Milford Graves & John Zorn chronology
50th Birthday Celebration Volume One (2004)	50th Birthday Celebration Volume Two (2004)	50th Birthday Celebration Volume 3 (2003)

50th Birthday Celebration Volume Two is a live album of improvised music by Milford Graves and John Zorn documenting their performance at Tonic in September 2003 as part of Zorn's month-long 50th Birthday Celebration concert series.

== Critical reception ==
Professional ratings
Review scores
Source	Rating
AllMusic	4/5 stars
The Penguin Guide to Jazz Recordings	3.5/4 stars

AllMusic awarded the album 4 stars.

The authors of The Penguin Guide to Jazz called the album "a delightfully old-fashioned free-jazz blowout", and wrote: "Zorn reasserts himself as a player in this context with insouciant ease, and Graves is as magisterial as ever."

== Track listing ==
All tracks are written by John Zorn.

No.	Title	Length
1.	"Inserted Space"	8:00
2.	"Looping Journeys"	6:54
3.	"Calling in Proceed"	11:15
4.	"Deep Within"	10:46
5.	"Smooth Interaction"	6:47
6.	"Talk"	2:51
7.	"Synchronicity"	7:39

== Personnel ==
- John Zorn – alto saxophone
- Milford Graves – drums, percussion
