= Haborym: Book of Angels Volume 16 =

Studio album by Masada String Trio
- Released: July 2010
- Recorded: 2010
- Genres: Avant-garde, jazz, Contemporary classical music
- Length: 46:30
- Labels: Tzadik; 7384
- Producer: John Zorn

Masada String Trio chronology
Azazel: Book of Angels Volume 2 (2005)	Haborym: Book of Angels Volume 16 (2010)

Book of Angels chronology
Baal: Book of Angels Volume 15 (2010)	Haborym: Book of Angels Volume 16 (2010)	Caym: Book of Angels Volume 17 (2010)

Haborym: Book of Angels Volume 16 is an album by the Masada String Trio performing compositions from John Zorn's second Masada book, "The Book of Angels".

== Reception ==
Professional ratings
Review scores
Source	Rating
Free Jazz Collective	4.5/5 stars

Stef Gijssels stated "Knowing that Zorn composes albums like this one in a few hours, you wonder how much of the music is the result of the musicians' contribution to some sketchy tunes and harmonic directions. Whatever the reality is, the interplay between all three virtusosi is stunning, bringing their incredibly broad bag of musical genres and styles together into a great mixture that can shift as easily from the classical over jazz to folk music and boundary-breaking new music, sometimes all in one track".

== Track listing ==
All compositions by John Zorn

1. "Turel" – 6:20
2. "Tychagara" – 3:39
3. "Carniel" – 4:42
4. "Bat Qol" – 2:55
5. "Gamrial" – 6:40
6. "Elimiel" – 3:04
7. "Techial" – 2:05
8. "Umikol" – 2:30
9. "Malkiel" – 4:23
10. "Raamiel" – 6:24
11. "Gergot" – 3:48

== Personnel ==
- Mark Feldman – violin
- Erik Friedlander – cello
- Greg Cohen – bass
