= Live in Jerusalem 1994 =

Live album by Masada
- Released: April 20, 1999
- Recorded: 1994
- Genre: Downtown music Avant-garde jazz
- Length: 112:04
- Label: Tzadik TZ 7322
- Producer: John Zorn

Masada chronology
Masada: Yod (1998)	Live in Jerusalem 1994 (1999)	Live in Taipei 1995 (1999)

John Zorn chronology
Music for Children (1998)	Live in Jerusalem 1994 (1999)	Godard/Spillane (1999)

Live in Jerusalem 1994 is a live album by John Zorn's Masada recorded at the Jerusalem Festival in 1994.

== Reception ==
The Allmusic review by Heather Phares awarded the album 4½ stars stating "Masada: Live in Jerusalem features versions of "Zebdi," "Jair," "Kanah," and "Netivot" that showcase Masada's intensity".

Professional ratings
Review scores
Source	Rating
Allmusic	4.5/5 stars
The Penguin Guide to Jazz	4/4 stars

== Track listing ==
All compositions by John Zorn

- Disc one
1. "Piram" - 9:52
2. "Bith Aneth" - 11:57
3. "Lachish" - 3:35
4. "Peliyot" - 7:11
5. "Hadasha" - 10:53
6. "Ravayah" - 3:35
7. "Zebdi" - 1:53
8. "Tirzah" - 8:07
9. "Hekhal" - 3:31
- Disc two
1. "Kanah" - 6:12
2. "Shilhim" - 2:39
3. "Ziphim" - 9:09
4. "Abidan" - 6:24
5. "Netivot" - 4:50
6. "Zelah" - 4:54
7. "Idalah-Abal" - 5:04
8. "Jair" - 5:15
9. "Ashnah" - 6:10

- Recorded live at the Jerusalem Festival

== Personnel ==
- John Zorn – saxophone
- Dave Douglas – trumpet
- Greg Cohen – bass
- Joey Baron – drums
