= Lucifer: Book of Angels Volume 10 =

Studio album by John Zorn
- Released: March 18, 2008
- Recorded: December 9, 2007
- Genres: Avant-garde, contemporary classical music, chamber jazz
- Length: 54:37
- Labels: Tzadik; TZ 7367
- Producer: John Zorn

Book of Angels chronology
Xaphan: Book of Angels Volume 9 (2008)	Lucifer: Book of Angels Volume 10 (2008)	Zaebos: Book of Angels Volume 11 (2008)

John Zorn chronology
The Dreamers (2008)	Lucifer: Book of Angels Volume 10 (2008)	The Stone: Issue Three (2008)

Lucifer: Book of Angels Volume 10 is an album by the Bar Kokhba Sextet performing compositions from John Zorn's second Masada book, "The Book of Angels".

== Reception ==
The Allmusic review by Sean Westergaard awarded the album 4½ stars stating "Honestly, with this material and these players, you just can't go wrong. There are highlights aplenty, starting with Ribot and Baptista on the opening track. Friedlander and Feldman shine on both "Dalquiel" and "Quelamia." Joey Baron tears it up on "Gediel" and does some great brushwork on "Azbugah." The playing all the way around is just fantastic. You could even play this album for your grandmother, something you can't say about much of the rest of the Zorn catalog. Whether you like all his projects or not, John Zorn's output has been of consistently high quality. Lucifer: Book of Angels, Vol. 10 is among the finest offerings in his discography, and a very accessible one at that".

Professional ratings
Review scores
Source	Rating
Allmusic	4.5/5 stars

== Track listing ==
1. Sother – 5:58
2. Dalqiel – 6:07 – misspelled as "Dalquiel" on album sleeve
3. Zazel – 3:22
4. Gediel – 6:12
5. Ramal – 3:49 – misspelled as "Rahal" on album sleeve
6. Zechriel – 7:54
7. Azbugah – 3:02
8. Mehalalel – 9:53
9. Quelamia – 4:59
10. Abdiel – 3:24

All compositions by John Zorn.

== Personnel ==
- Cyro Baptista – percussion
- Joey Baron – drums
- Greg Cohen – bass
- Mark Feldman – violin
- Erik Friedlander – cello
- Marc Ribot – guitar
