= Filmworks III: 1990–1995 =

Soundtrack album by John Zorn
- Released: 1995 re-released 1997
- Recorded: 1990–1995
- Genre: avant-garde, jazz, classical
- Length: 60:17
- Label: Toys Factory, Evva, Tzadik
- Producer: John Zorn

Filmworks chronology
Filmworks II: Music for an Untitled Film by Walter Hill (1995)	Filmworks III: 1990–1995 (1995)	Filmworks IV: S&M + More (1996)

John Zorn chronology
John Zorn's Cobra: Tokyo Operations '94 (1995)	Filmworks III: 1990–1995 (1995)	Bar Kokhba (1996)

Filmworks III: 1990–1995 features the scores for film and advertisements by John Zorn. The album was originally released on the Japanese labels Evva in 1995 and Toys Factory in 1996 and subsequently re-released on Zorn's own label, Tzadik Records, in 1997. It features the music that Zorn wrote and recorded for Thieves Quartet (1993), directed by Joe Chappelle, which was performed by the group that would become Masada; nine cues for Kiriko Kubo's Music For Tsunta (1988); eleven tracks for Hollywood Hotel (1994), directed by Mei-Juin Chen; and thirty-two pieces for advertisements by Wieden & Kennedy.

== Reception ==
The Allmusic review by Joslyn Layne awarded the album 4 stars noting that "The third volume cataloguing John Zorn's film scores is a quality release that offers the scores from two films, a rare piece of music cues that would lead to Cynical Hysterie Hour, and music spots for commercials... The musicianship and stylistic range found here is commendable".

Professional ratings
Review scores
Source	Rating
Allmusic	4/5 stars

== Track listing ==
Thieves Quartet (1993), directed by Joe Chappelle
01/ "Main Title" - 1:00
02/ "The Caper" - 0:57
03/ "Cadence" - 0:15
04/ "Kidnapping" - 2:15
05/ "Doubt" - 0:19
06/ "Nocturne 1" - 0:26
07/ "Nocturne 2" - 0:55
08/ "Bag Man" - 2:00
09/ "The Cop" - 0:27
10/ "Nocturne 3" - 0:55
11/ "Juke Box" - 2:45
12/ "End Titles" - 4:28

- Recorded in New York City in July 1993
- John Zorn - alto saxophone, piano on (12)
- Dave Douglas - trumpet
- Greg Cohen - bass
- Joey Baron - drums
- Robert Quine (11) - guitar

Music for Tsunta (1988), directed by Kiriko Kubo
13/ Music For Tsunta (nine cues) - 3:31

- Recorded in New York City in February 1988
- Bill Frisell - guitar, banjo
- Peter Scherer - keyboards
- Carol Emanuel - harp
- Christian Marclay - turntables
- David Hofstra - bass, tuba
- Cyro Baptista - percussion, voice
- Bobby Previte - drums, percussion

Hollywood Hotel (1994), directed by Mei-Juin Chen
14/ "Main Titles" - 1:36
15/ "Washing Machine a" - 0:26
16/ "Washing Machine b" - 0:39
17/ "Night Hotel" - 1:17
18/ "Japanese Tourists" - 1:54
19/ "Night Hotel 2" - 1:18
20/ "Objects" - 3:16
21/ "Night Hotel 3" - 1:00
22/ "Rooftop Death Rattle" - 0:59
23/ "Taiwan" - 3:48
24/ "End Titles" - 1:50

- Recorded in New York City on April 21, 1994
- John Zorn - alto saxophone
- Marc Ribot - guitars

Music for Weiden and Kennedy (1990–1995)
25/ "Holland" - 0:16
26/ "Canada" - 0:31
27/ "France" - 0:16
28/ "Germany" - 0:33
29/ "Sweden" - 0:30
30/ "USA" - 0:28
31/ "Canada 2" - 0:15
32/ "Sweden 2" - 0:15
33/ "Italy" - 0:14
34/ "Great Lobby" - 0:33
35/ "Wheelchair Races" - 0:42
36/ "Logo" - 0:14
37/ "Secret Code" - 0:34
38/ "Secret Code 2" - 1:04
39/ "Don't Break" - 0:40
40/ "Don't Break 2" - 1:09
41/ "Footnotes" - 0:35
42/ "Footnotes 2" - 1:10
43/ "Retraction" - 0:41
44/ "Retraction 2" - 1:15
45/ "Protest" - 0:39
46/ "Protest 2" - 1:13
47/ "Launch" - 0:42
48/ "Launch 2" - 1:14
49/ "Elevator" - 0:40
50/ "Elevator 2" - 1:09
51/ "Fiance" - 0:39
52/ "Fiance 2" - 1:13
53/ "Around the World" - 1:06
54/ "Batman" - 0:32
55/ "Abstract Woman" - 0:35
56/ "Mystic Woman" - 0:39

- (25-33) recorded in New York City in November 1990
- (34) recorded in New York City in March 1992
- (35,36) recorded in New York City on August 25, 1993
- (37-52) recorded in New York City on May 13, 1994
- (53) recorded in New York City on November 3, 1994
- (54-56) recorded in New York City on January 24, 1990
- Carol Emanuel - harp
- Marc Ribot - banjo, guitar
- Cyro Baptista - percussion;
- Kermit Driscoll - bass
- Peter Scherer - keyboards
- David Shea - samples
- Arto Lindsay - guitar, voice
- Bill Laswell - bass
- Ikue Mori - drum machines
- Keith Underwood - flute
- Jill Jaffee - viola
- Miguel Frasconi - glass harmonica
- Robert Quine - guitar
- Guy Klucevsek - accordion
- Anthony Coleman - organ, keyboards
- Greg Cohen - bass
- Joey Baron - drums
- Chris Wood - bass
- Sim Cain - drums
- Eric Friedlander - cello
- John Zorn - alto saxophone

All Music by John Zorn

- Produced by John Zorn
