= Vira Loucos =

Studio album by Cyro Baptista
- Released: August 19, 1997
- Recorded: September–November 1996, Hillside Sound, Englewood, NJ
- Genre: Jazz
- Length: 45:08
- Label: Avant Avan 061
- Producer: John Zorn & Kazunori Sugiyama

Cyro Baptista chronology
Cyro (1988)	Vira Loucos (1997)	Supergenerous (2000)

Vira Loucos (subtitled Cyro Baptista Plays the Music of Villa-Lobos) is an album by percussionist Cyro Baptista performing the compositions by or inspired by Heitor Villa-Lobos which was released on the Japanese Avant label in 1997.

== Reception ==
Professional ratings
Review scores
Source	Rating
Allmusic	4/5 stars

In his review for Allmusic, Brian Olewnick notes that "Baptista has a assembled a group both light on its feet and capable of negotiating the trickiest of rhythmic passages and deliriously romantic melodies with wit, enthusiasm, and grace. Highly recommended".

== Track listing ==
All compositions by Heitor Villa-Lobos except as indicated

1. "Dansa" – 3:33
2. "Passion in the Basement" (Cyro Baptista, Naná Vasconcelos) – 3:31
3. "Cantiga" – 5:47
4. "Ama/Teresinha de Jesus" (Baptista) – 4:52
5. "Complaint/Sabia" (Baptista/Hervé Cordovil) – 3:15
6. "Choro/Trrenzinho Caipira" – 6:40
7. "Choros Number 8" – 3:51
8. "Dansa Do Indio Branco" – 3:31
9. "Ciranda" (Baptista) – 5:09
10. "Sapo Cururu" (Baptista) – 5:02

== Personnel ==
- Cyro Baptista – percussion, vocals
- Greg Cohen – bass
- Romero Lubambo – cavaquinho acoustic guitar
- Marc Ribot – electric guitar acoustic guitar, banjo
- John Zorn – alto saxophone (tracks 1 & 10)
- Vanessa Fallabella (tracks 1 & 5), Naná Vasconcelos (track 2) – vocals
- Chango Spasiuk – cantiga accordion (track 3)
- Akiko Matsumoto, Alessandro Ciari, Carolina Teizeria, Healey Gabison, Kaleb Moreau, Lauren Melquiond, Lira Teizeria, Moran Broza, Roman Broza, Sabina Ciari, Stepanie Teixeira, Tessa Fernandes – children's choir (track 10)
