= Azazel: Book of Angels Volume 2 =

Studio album by Masada String Trio
- Released: October 18, 2005
- Recorded: June 14, 2005
- Genres: Avant-garde, contemporary classical music
- Length: 53:48
- Label: Tzadik
- Producer: John Zorn

Book of Angels chronology
Astaroth: Book of Angels Volume 1 (2005)	Azazel: Book of Angels Volume 2 (2005)	Malphas: Book of Angels Volume 3 (2005)

Masada String Trio chronology
50th Birthday Celebration Volume 1 (2004)	Azazel: Book of Angels Volume 2 (2005)	Haborym: Book of Angels Volume 16 (2010)

Azazel: Book of Angels Volume 2 is an album by the Masada String Trio performing compositions from John Zorn's second Masada book, "Book of Angels". All of the tracks were composed by John Zorn and conducted by him.

== Reception ==
The Allmusic review awarded the album 3½ stars.

Professional ratings
Review scores
Source	Rating
Allmusic	3.5/5 stars

== Track listing ==
All compositions by John Zorn.

1. "Tufiel" – 6:22
2. "Mibi" – 1:53
3. "Tabaet" – 6:46
4. "Symnay" – 5:23
5. "Mastema" – 6:39
6. "Bethor" – 5:25
7. "Uriel" – 4:37
8. "Gurid" – 1:52
9. "Gazriel" – 4:04
10. "Azazel" – 5:26
11. "Rsassiel" – 2:38 – misspelled as "Rssasiel" on album sleeve
12. "Garzanal" – 5:21
13. "Ahiel" – 3:47
  - Recorded at Pilot Recording in New York City on June 14, 2005

== Personnel ==
- Greg Cohen – bass
- Mark Feldman – violin
- Erik Friedlander – cello
