= 50th Birthday Celebration Volume Seven =

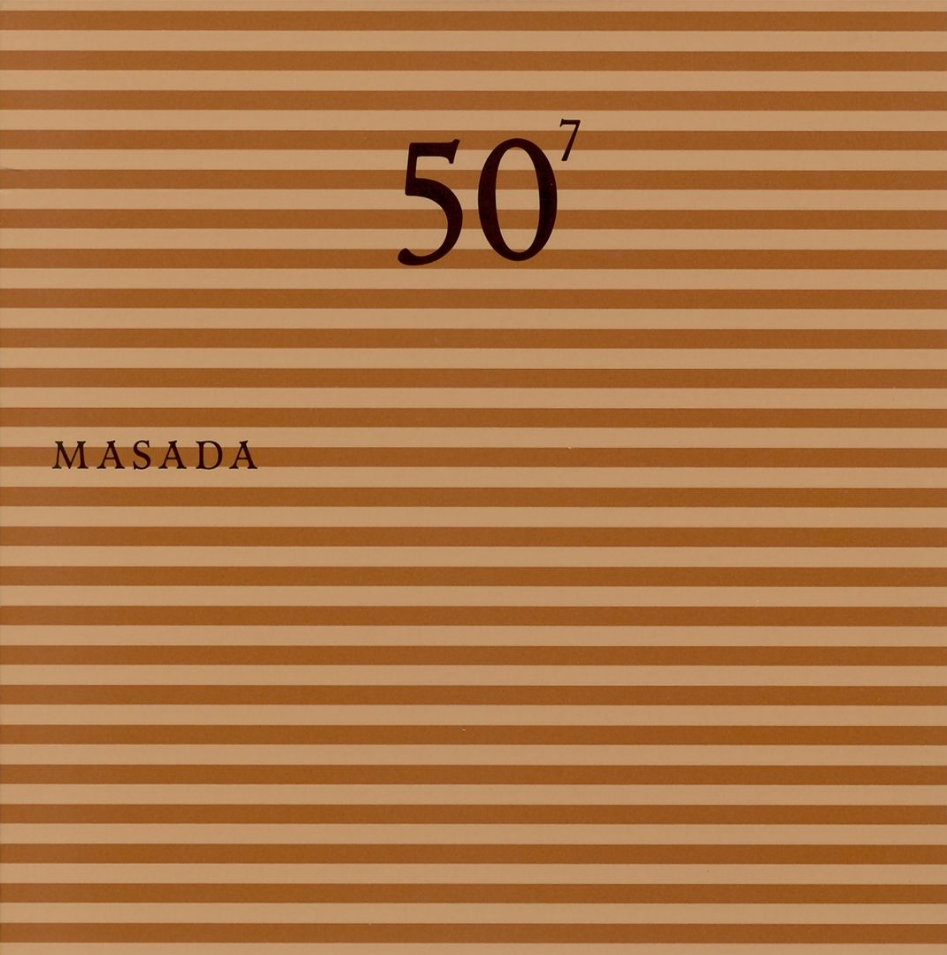

Live album by Masada
- Released: September 21, 2004
- Recorded: September, 2003
- Venues: Tonic, NYC
- Genres: Downtown music Avant-garde jazz
- Length: 67:28
- Labels: Tzadik; TZ 5007
- Producer: John Zorn

John Zorn chronology
| 50th Birthday Celebration Volume Six (2004) | 50th Birthday Celebration Volume Seven (2004) | Magick (2004) |

Masada chronology
| First Live 1993 (2002) | 50th Birthday Celebration Volume Seven (2004) | Sanhedrin 1994-1997 (2005) |

50th Birthday Celebration Volume Seven is a live album by Masada documenting their performance at Tonic in September 2003 as part of John Zorn's month-long 50th Birthday Celebration.

== Critical reception ==
The AllMusic review awarded the album 3½ stars.

Professional ratings
Review scores
| Source | Rating |
|---|---|
| AllMusic | 3.5/5 stars |

== Track listing ==
All tracks are written by John Zorn.

| No. | Title | Length |
|---|---|---|
| 1. | "Karaim" | 14:28 |
| 2. | "Hath-Arob" | 5:18 |
| 3. | "Sippur" | 3:57 |
| 4. | "Acharei Mot" | 9:12 |
| 5. | "Kedushah" | 9:16 |
| 6. | "Ravayah" | 4:32 |
| 7. | "Piram" | 12:19 |
| 8. | "Ashnah" | 8:19 |

== Personnel ==
=== Masada ===
- John Zorn – saxophone
- Dave Douglas – trumpet
- Greg Cohen – bass
- Joey Baron – drums
