= At the Mountains of Madness (Electric Masada album) =

Live album by Electric Masada
- Released: November 22, 2005
- Recorded: April 29 and May 4, 2004
- Length: 156:44
- Label: Tzadik
- Producers: John Zorn and Kazunori Sugiyama

Electric Masada chronology
50th Birthday Celebration Volume 4 (2004)	At the Mountains of Madness (2005)

John Zorn chronology
Mysterium (2005)	At the Mountains of Madness (2005)	Filmworks XVII: Notes on Marie Menken/Ray Bandar: A Life with Skulls (2006)

At the Mountains of Madness is a 2005 double live album by American composer and saxophonist John Zorn's Electric Masada featuring performances recorded in Moscow and Ljubljana. It is the second release by Electric Masada.

== Reception ==
The Allmusic review by Sean Westergaard awarded the album 4 stars noting that "the band is at the top of their game after all the touring, and everyone seems to have kicked up the energy a notch or two. There's a lot more conducted improvisation than on the previous Electric Masada release... Thanks to their improvisational skills, you hardly notice that the program is much the same on both discs. Score another one for John Zorn and company. At the Mountains of Madness is a winner."

Professional ratings
Review scores
Source	Rating
Allmusic	4/5 stars
Rolling Stone	4/5 stars

== Track listing ==
- Disc one
1. "Lilin" – 16:14
2. "Metal Tov" – 5:35
3. "Karaim" – 16:15
4. "Hath-Arob" – 5:17
5. "Abidan" – 8:09
6. "Idalah-Abal" – 6:33
7. "Kedem" – 15:41
8. "Yatzar" – 6:05
- Disc two
1. "Tekufah" – 17:59
2. "Hath-Arob" – 6:55
3. "Abidan" – 9:59
4. "Metal Tov" – 5:52
5. "Karaim" – 15:15
6. "Idalah-Abal" – 6:08
7. "Kedem" – 14:47

All compositions by John Zorn.

- Disc 1 recorded by Daniel Goldaracena in Moscow, 2004. Disc 2 recorded by Daniel Goldaracena in Ljubljana, 2004.

== Personnel ==
- John Zorn – alto saxophone
- Marc Ribot – guitar
- Jamie Saft – keyboards
- Ikue Mori – electronics
- Trevor Dunn – bass
- Joey Baron – drums
- Kenny Wollesen – drums
- Cyro Baptista – percussion
