= Signals for Tea =

Studio album by Steve Beresford
- Released: 25 April 1995
- Recorded: July 1994; Baby Monster Studios, New York City
- Genre: Avant-garde, Jazz
- Length: 66:33
- Label: Avant AVAN 039
- Producer: John Zorn and Steve Beresford

Steve Beresford chronology
Fish of the Week (1993)	Signals for Tea (1995)	Short in the U.K. (1996)

Signals for Tea is a 1995 album by composer, musician and arranger Steve Beresford which was released on the Japanese Avant label.

== Reception ==
Professional ratings
Review scores
Source	Rating
Allmusic	3.5/5 stars

The Allmusic review by Brian Olewnick stated "While generally enjoyable, a bit of sameness sets in after a while; the lyrics maintain interest, but the themes begin to blend into one another. The disc is worth hearing, however, if only to hear a side of the jazz avant-garde normally kept under wraps".

== Track listing ==
All compositions by Steve Beresford and lyrics by Andrew Brenner

1. "All My Fibres" – 4:01
2. "Rent" – 4:17
3. "Unremarkable" – 5:44
4. "Signals for Tea" – 4:16
5. "Approximate Song" – 3:31
6. "Let's Get Cynical" – 3:43
7. "Good Morning" – 6:50
8. "The 3 Doors" – 6:06
9. "Elephants" – 4:05
10. "Little Window" – 4:30
11. "The Agony of You" – 3:40
12. "Good Morning (Solo Version)" – 3:15
13. "Speed Limit" – 8:33
14. "Unremarkable (Solo Version)" – 3:43

== Personnel ==
- Steve Beresford – piano, vocals
- John Zorn – alto saxophone backing vocals
- Dave Douglas – trumpet, backing vocals
- Greg Cohen – bass, backing vocals
- Kenny Wollesen – drums, backing vocals
