= Bar Kokhba (album) =

Studio album by John Zorn
- Released: 1996
- Recorded: August 1994, December 1995, & March 1996
- Studios: Baby Monster Studios, New York City
- Genres: Avant-garde jazz, klezmer, chamber jazz
- Length: 128:09
- Label: Tzadik
- Producer: John Zorn

John Zorn chronology
Filmworks III: 1990–1995 (1996)	Bar Kokhba (1996)	In Memory of Nikki Arane (1996)

Bar Kokhba is a double album by John Zorn, recorded between 1994 and 1996. It features music from Zorn's Masada project, rearranged for small ensembles. It also features the original soundtrack from The Art of Remembrance – Simon Wiesenthal, a film by Johanna Heer and Werner Schmiedel (1994–95).

== Reception ==
The AllMusic review by Marc Gilman noted: "While some compositions retain their original structure and sound, some are expanded and probed by Zorn's arrangements, and resemble avant-garde classical music more than jazz. But this is the beauty of the album; the ensembles provide a forum for Zorn to expand his compositions. The album consistently impresses."

Professional ratings
Review scores
Source	Rating
AllMusic	4.5/5 stars
The Penguin Guide to Jazz Recordings	3.5/4 stars

== Track listing ==
All compositions by John Zorn

Disc One

1. "Gevurah" – 6:55
2. "Nezikin" – 1:51
3. "Mahshav" – 4:33
4. "Rokhev" – 3:10
5. "Abidan" – 5:19
6. "Sheloshim" – 5:03
7. "Hath-Arob" – 2:25
8. "Paran" – 4:48
9. "Mahlah" – 7:48
10. "Socoh" – 4:07
11. "Yechida" – 8:24
12. "Bikkurim" – 3:25
13. "Idalah-Abal" – 5:04

Disc Two

1. "Tannaim" – 4:38
2. "Nefesh" – 3:33
3. "Abidan" – 3:13
4. "Mo'ed" – 4:59
5. "Maskil" – 4:41
6. "Mishpatim" – 6:46
7. "Sansanah" – 6:56
8. "Shear-Jashub" – 2:06
9. "Mahshav" – 4:50
10. "Sheloshim" – 6:45
11. "Mochin" – 13:11
12. "Karaim" – 3:39

== Personnel ==
- John Zorn – Producer
- Mark Feldman (2,4,6,10,12,14,16,20,21,25) – violin
- Erik Friedlander (2,4,6,10,12,14,16,21,25) – cello
- Greg Cohen (2,4,6,9,10,12,14,16,18,21,25) – bass
- Marc Ribot (9,18,24) – guitar
- Anthony Coleman (1,3,11,17,19) – piano
- David Krakauer (3,8) – clarinets
- John Medeski (5,7,8,13,15,17,20,22,23) – organ, piano
- Mark Dresser (1,15,19) – bass
- Kenny Wollesen (1,2,15,19,23) – drums
- Chris Speed (5,13,20,23) – clarinet
- Dave Douglas (23) – trumpet
