= Sanhedrin 1994–1997 =

Studio album by John Zorn
- Released: March 22, 2005
- Recorded: 1994−1997
- Genre: Jazz
- Length: 153:07
- Label: Tzadik
- Producer: John Zorn

Masada chronology
50th Birthday Celebration Volume 7 (2004)	Sanhedrin 1994–1997 (2005)

John Zorn chronology
Naked City: The Complete Studio Recordings (2005)	Sanhedrin 1994–1997 (2005)	Filmworks XVI: Workingman's Death (2005)

Sanhedrin 1994–1997 is a 2005 double album by John Zorn's Masada featuring previously unreleased studio recordings.

== Reception ==
The Allmusic review by Sean Westergaard awarded the album 4 stars stating "This band has become one of the finest jazz ensembles of the last several decades, and there will probably come a time when folks will be drooling over any previously unreleased scraps the same way they do today over lost Monk and Coltrane recordings. The improvisations and interactions -- not to mention the dynamics -- can change from one performance to the next, and it's interesting to hear how these players approach the tunes on different takes. The package is lovely, with liner notes from all the bandmembers, and, of course, the playing is phenomenal".

Professional ratings
Review scores
Source	Rating
Allmusic	4/5 stars

== Track listing ==
All compositions by John Zorn.

- Disc One
1. "Piram" – 6:22
2. "Lebaoth" – 6:08
3. "Idalah Abal" – 7:38
4. "Midbar" – 5:06
5. "Zelah" – 4:27
6. "Katzatz" – 2:20
7. "Abidan" – 6:53
8. "Hekhal" – 3:07
9. "Tannaim" – 8:34
10. "Nefesh" – 5:40
11. "Neshamah" – 7:15
12. "Lakom" – 3:46
13. "Tiferet" – 5:33
14. "Evel" – 5:42
- Disc Two
1. "Hath Arob" – 3:33
2. "Mahshav" – 6:06
3. "Zemer" – 2:36
4. "Ne'Eman" – 8:46
5. "Meholalot" – 7:11
6. "Kochot" – 5:19
7. "Jachin" – 4:46
8. "Moshav" – 7:26
9. "Acharei Mot" – 8:50
10. "Kilayim" – 3:08
11. "Otiot" – 3:44
12. "Nashim" – 3:50
13. "Karet" – 1:25
14. "Hashmal" – 3:21
15. "Ruach" – 5:28
- Disc 1, Tracks 1–5 Recorded Feb. 20, 1994
- Disc 1, Tracks 6–10 Recorded Jun. 22, 1994
- Disc 1, Tracks 11–13 Recorded Jul. 16–17, 1995
- Disc 1, Track 14 and Disc 2, Tracks 1–3 Recorded Apr. 16, 1996
- Disc 2, Track 4 Recorded Aug. 1, 1996
- Disc 2, Tracks 5–9 Recorded Apr. 21, 1997
- Disc 2, Tracks 10–15 Recorded Sep. 15, 1997
- Produced by John Zorn and Kazunori Sugiyama

== Personnel ==
- John Zorn – alto saxophone
- Dave Douglas – trumpet
- Greg Cohen – bass
- Joey Baron – drums
