= The Bribe (album) =

Studio album by John Zorn
- Released: 1998
- Recorded: 1986
- Studio: Radio City Studio, New York City
- Genre: Avant-garde, Jazz
- Length: 76:01
- Label: Tzadik TZ 7320
- Producer: John Zorn

John Zorn chronology
Aporias: Requia for Piano and Orchestra (1998)	The Bribe (1998)	Music for Children (1998)

The Bribe: variations and extensions on Spillane is the ninth studio album by American composer and saxophonist/multi-instrumentalist John Zorn, consisting of music created for three half-hour radio plays produced by Mabou Mines theater company in 1986. It utilizes compositional techniques, source material, and personnel that are similar to Zorn's Spillane.

The album shares its title with The Bribe, a 1949 American film noir directed by Robert Z. Leonard.

== Reception ==
Professional ratings
Review scores
Source	Rating
Allmusic	4/5 stars

The Allmusic review by Joslyn Layne awarded the album 4 stars stating "A nicer mood pervades this release, yet given its kaleidoscopic and slightly demented tone, it certainly can't be described as relaxed. Then again, maybe "relaxed" isn't too far off, after all—perhaps by playing a supporting role to the production's cast instead of driving the concept, the musicians were able to enjoy themselves a little more.".

== Track listing ==
- Part 1: Sliding On The Ice
1. "Gill's Theme" - 2:07
2. "Hydrant Of The Vogue" - 0:41
3. "The Big Freeze" - 1:01
4. "Meters" - 2:24
5. "The Bridge/Cocktails" - 4:06
6. "The Willies" - 1:01
7. "The Taxman Cometh" - 1:16
8. "Night Walk" - 1:09
9. "Skit Rhesus" - 2:43
10. "The Boxer" - 0:59
11. "Trick Or Treat" - 3:22
12. "The Latin Trip/Gill's Theme" - 3:30
- Part 2: The Arrest
1. "A Taste Of Voodoo" - 3:20
2. "Inhaling The Image" - 1:49
3. "City Chase" - 3:27
4. "Dreams Of The Red Chamber" - 11:38
5. "Rash Acts" - 1:30
6. "Chippewa" - 1:24
7. "The Hour Of Thirteen" - 0:47
8. "Radio Mouth/Gill's Theme" - 2:57
- Part 3: The Art Bar
1. "Midnight Streets" - 3:58
2. "Victoria Lake" - 3:12
3. "Strip Central" - 5:26
4. "Pink Limousine" - 9:18
5. "Skyline" - 3:19
6. "Ordinary Lies/Gill's Theme" - 2:04

All compositions by John Zorn
- Recorded at Radio City Studio, New York City in 1986.

== Personnel ==
- John Zorn - alto saxophone
- Anthony Coleman - piano
- Marty Ehrlich - reeds
- Carol Emanuel - harp
- David Hofstra - double bass
- Wayne Horvitz - organ
- Christian Marclay - turntables
- Ikue Mori - drum machines
- Zeena Parkins - harp
- Bobby Previte - percussion
- Robert Quine - guitar
- Reck - rhythm guitar
- Jim Staley - trombone
