= Greg Cohen =

American jazz bassist (born 1953)

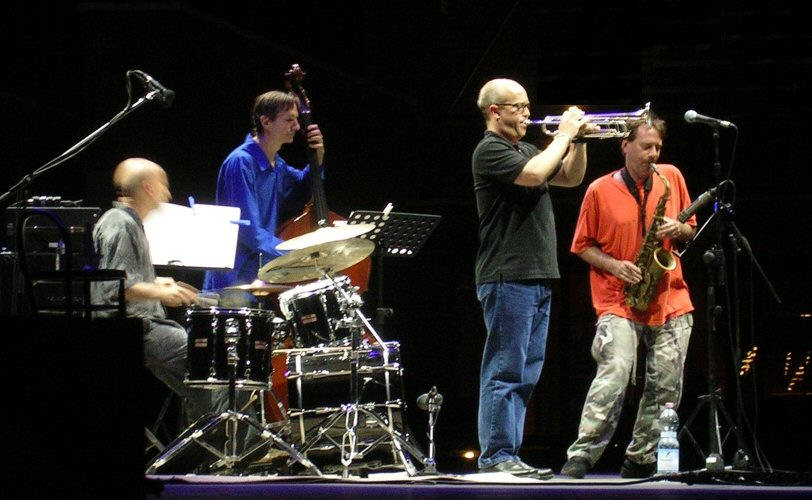
- Masada in concert: Joey Baron (drums), Cohen (bass), Dave Douglas (trumpet), John Zorn (saxophone)

Background information
- Born: July 13, 1953 (age 73); Los Angeles, California, U.S.
- Genres: Jazz, jazz fusion
- Occupation: Musician
- Instruments: Bass guitar, double bass
- Member of: Masada

Greg Cohen (born July 13, 1953) is an American jazz bassist who has been a member of John Zorn's Masada quartet and worked with numerous other noted musicians for over four decades.

== Career ==
Cohen plays traditional jazz and other styles, including work with Ken Peplowski, Kenny Davern, Marty Grosz, and Woody Allen. He has also worked with Tom Waits, David Byrne, Elvis Costello, Dagmar Krause, David Sanborn, Susana Baca, Gal Costa, Marisa Monte, Laurie Anderson, Willie Nelson, Bill Frisell, Norah Jones, Dave Douglas, Tricky, Jesse Harris, Keith Richards and Charlie Watts, Joey Baron, Donovan, Crystal Gayle, Nina Nastasia, Alan Watts, Lee Konitz, Richie Havens, Dino Saluzzi, Lou Reed, Marianne Faithfull, Odetta, Vesna Pisarović, Danny Barker, Christina Courtin, Tim Sparks, and Antony and the Johnsons.

In August 2006 he was musical director of the Century of Song series at the German arts festival RuhrTriennale. He invited songwriters and performers such as David Byrne, Holly Cole and Laurie Anderson.

He has been a regular member of Woody Allen and his New Orleans Jazz Band, which played at the Carlyle Hotel in Manhattan. He appeared in the documentary Wild Man Blues (directed by Barbara Kopple) about a 1996 European tour by Allen and his band. Cohen appears in Robert Altman's 1993 film Short Cuts.

Cohen is a bass professor and the head of string department at the Jazz Institute Berlin. He is also an honorary professor in contemporary rhythmic music at SDMK - Danish National Academy of Music.

== Discography ==
=== As leader ===
- Way Low (DIW, 1996)
- Moment to Moment (DIW, 1998)
- Golden State (Relative Pitch, 2014)

=== As sideman ===
With Terry Adams

- Terrible (New World Records, 1995)

With Laurie Anderson

- Bright Red (Warner Bros., 1994)
- Life on a String (Elektra Nonesuch, 2001)

With Elvis Costello

- Painted from Memory (Mercury Records, 1998)

With Christina Courtin

- Christina Courtin (Nonesuch Records, 2009)
- Situation Station (In A Circle, 2020)

With A. J. Croce

- Twelve Tales (Compass, 2013)

With Dave Douglas

- Charms of the Night Sky (Winter & Winter, 1997)
- A Thousand Evenings (RCA, 2000)
- El Trilogy (BMG, 2001)

With Marty Grosz

- (The Orphan Newsboys) Extra! (Jazzology, 1989)
- Unsaturated Fats (Stomp Off, 1990)
- (The Orphan Newsboys) Laughing at Life (Stomp Off, 1990)
- Donaldson Redux (Stomp Off, 1991)
- Songs I Learned at My Mother's Knee and Other Low Joints (Jazzology, 1992)
- (The Orphan Newsboys) Live at the L.A. Classic (Jazzology, 1992)
- Thanks (J&M, 1993)
- (The Orphan Newsboys) Rhythm for Sale! (Jazzology, 1993, 1995, 1996)
- Just Imagine … Songs of DeSylva, Brown & Henderson (Stomp Off, 1994)
- Keep a Song in Your Soul (Jazzology, 1994)
- Ring Dem Bells (Nagel Heyer, 1995)
- Going Hollywood (Stomp Off, 1996)
- Left to His Own Devices (Jazzology, 1999)
- Marty Grosz and His Hot Combination (Arbors, 2005)

With Tim Sparks

- At the Rebbe's Table (Tzadik, 2002)
- Little Princess (Tzadik, 2009)

With Tom Waits

- Heartattack and Vine (Asylum, 1980)
- Swordfishtrombones (Island, 1983)
- Rain Dogs (Island, 1985)
- Franks Wild Years (Island, 1987)
- The Black Rider (Island, 1993)
- Mule Variations (Anti, 1999)

With Victoria Williams

- Happy Come Home (Geffen, 1987)
- Loose (Atlantic, 1994)
- Musings of a Creek Dipper (Atlantic, 1998)

With John Zorn

- Masada: Alef (DIW, 1994) with Masada
- Masada: Beit (DIW, 1994) with Masada
- Masada: Gimel (DIW, 1994) with Masada
- Masada: Dalet (DIW, 1994) with Masada
- Masada: Hei (DIW, 1995) with Masada
- Masada: Vav (DIW, 1995) with Masada
- Masada: Zayin (DIW, 1996) with Masada
- Bar Kokhba (Tzadik, 1996) with Bar Kokhba
- Masada: Het (DIW, 1996) with Masada
- Masada: Tet (DIW, 1997) with Masada
- Live in Jerusalem 1994 (Tzadik, 1997) with Masada
- Live in Taipei 1995 (Tzadik, 1997) with Masada
- Masada: Yod (DIW, 1997) with Masada
- The Circle Maker (Tzadik, 1998) with Bar Kokhba and Masada String Trio
- Live in Middleheim 1999 (Tzadik, 1999) with Masada
- Live in Sevilla 2000 (Tzadik, 2000) with Masada
- Live at Tonic 2001 (Tzadik., 2000) with Masada
- First Live 1993 (Tzadik, 2002) with Masada
- Filmworks XI: Secret Lives (Tzadik, 2002) with Masada String Trio
- The Unknown Masada (Tzadik, 2003)
- 50th Birthday Celebration Volume 1 (Tzadik, 2003) with Masada String Trio
- 50th Birthday Celebration Volume 7 (Tzadik, 2003) with Masada
- 50th Birthday Celebration Volume 11 (Tzadik, 2003) with Masada String Trio
- Astaroth: Book of Angels Volume 1 (Tzadik, 2004) with the Jamie Saft Trio
- Sanhedrin 1994–1997 (Tzadik, 2005) with Masada
- Azazel: Book of Angels Volume 2 (Tzadik, 2005) with Masada String Trio
- Filmworks XX: Sholem Aleichem (Tzadik, 2008)
- Lucifer: Book of Angels Volume 10 (Tzadik, 2008) with Bar Kokhba
- Stolas: Book of Angels Volume 12 (Tzadik, 2009) with Masada Quintet
- Alhambra Love Songs (Tzadik, 2009)
- Baal: Book of Angels Volume 15 (Tzadik, 2010) with Ben Goldberg Quartet
- Haborym: Book of Angels Volume 16 (Tzadik, 2010) with Masada String Trio
- In Search of the Miraculous (Tzadik, 2010)

With others

- Fiona Apple, When the Pawn... (Epic, 1999)
- Cyro Baptista, Vira Loucos (Avant, 1997)
- Steve Beresford, Signals for Tea (Avant, 1995)
- David Byrne, Feelings (Warner Bros., 1997)
- David Byrne, Look into the Eyeball (Virgin, 2001)
- Marc Cohn, Join the Parade (Decca, 2007)
- Holly Cole, Holly Cole (Alert, 2006)
- Anthony Coleman, Sephardic Tinge (Tzadik, 1995)
- Kenny Davern and Ken Peplowski, The Jazz KENnection (Arbors, 2001)
- Peter Ecklund, Ecklund at Elkhart (Jazzology, 1994)
- Marianne Faithfull, Easy Come, Easy Go (Naive, 2008)
- Mark Feldman, Secrets with Uri Caine and Joey Baron (Tzadik, 2009)
- Michael Franks, Time Together (Shanachie, 2011)
- Keiji Haino, An Unclear Trial (Avant, 1998)
- Joe Jackson, Fast Forward (Caroline, 2015)
- Natalie Merchant, Leave Your Sleep (Nonesuch, 2010)
- Randy Newman, Bad Love (DreamWorks, 1999)
- Randy Newman, Harps and Angels (Nonesuch, 2008)
- Ken Peplowski, Grenadilla (Concord, 1997)
- Madeleine Peyroux, Dreamland (Atlantic, 1996)
- Marc Ribot, Shoe String Symphonettes (Tzadik, 1997)
- Jamie Saft, Trouble: The Jamie Saft Trio Plays Bob Dylan (Tzadik, 2006)
- Ron Sexsmith, Other Songs (Interscope, 1997)
- Julian Siegel, Live at The Vortex (Basho, 2008)
- Loudon Wainwright III, Social Studies (Hannibal, 1999)
