= Joey Baron =

American avant-garde jazz drummer (born 1955)

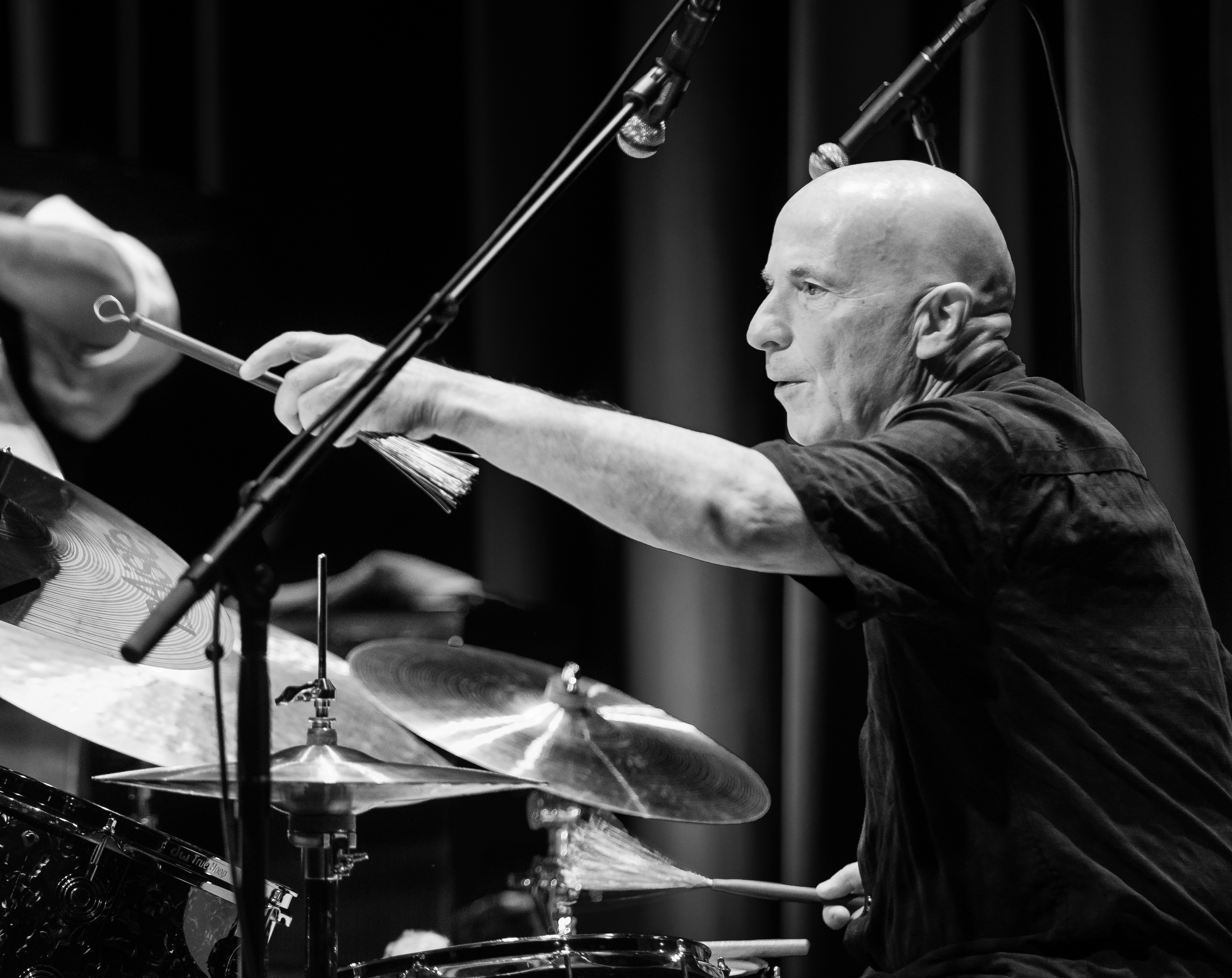
- Joey Baron performing in Munch, Oslo 2023; Photo: Tore Sætre

Background information
- Born: Bernard Joseph Baron; June 26, 1955 (age 70); Richmond, Virginia, U.S.
- Genres: Jazz, avant-garde jazz
- Occupation: Musician
- Instrument: Drums
- Years active: 1975–present
- Labels: JMT, Intuition, ECM, Tzadik, Elektra Nonesuch, CAM Jazz, DIW

Bernard Joseph Baron (born June 26, 1955 in Richmond, Virginia) is an American drummer best-known for working in avant-garde jazz with Bill Frisell and John Zorn.

== Music career ==
Baron, who is of Jewish heritage, was born on June 26, 1955, in Richmond, Virginia. When he was nine, he taught himself how to play the drums. As a teenager, he played in rock bands and dixieland jazz groups and was given his first gig opportunity at the age of 13 when pianist BJ Doyle's regular drummer took ill and she knew he was a keeper after just minutes. After high school, he spent a year at the Berklee College of Music. He moved to Los Angeles in the early 1970s and embarked on a professional career, playing with Carmen McRae and Al Jarreau. He worked as a freelance drummer and session musician with Chet Baker, Stan Getz, Dizzy Gillespie, and Hampton Hawes.

In 1982 he moved to New York City and joined guitarist Bill Frisell, with whom he would play often throughout his career. He also played in groups with Red Rodney, Fred Hersch, Enrico Pieranunzi, and Marc Johnson. Starting in the late 1980s, he became a bigger part of the avant-garde jazz scene when he played regularly at the Knitting Factory, recorded with singer Laurie Anderson, and began a long association with John Zorn. For several years he participated in Zorn's projects Naked City and Masada.

Baron contributed to David Bowie's Outside (1995). Bowie would later praise Baron, stating: "Metronomes shake in fear, he's so steady."

== Discography ==
=== As leader/co-leader ===
- Tongue in Groove (JMT, 1992)
- RAIsedpleasuredot (New World, 1993)
- Crackshot (Avant, 1995)
- Down Home (Intuition, 1997)
- We'll Soon Find Out (Intuition, 1999)
- Killer Joey (Goo-Head, 2000)
- Beyond (Auditorium, 2001)
- Venice, Dal Vivo (D'Autres Cordes, 2010)
- Just Listen (Relative Pitch, 2013)
- Live! (Intakt, 2017) with Irène Schweizer
- Now You Hear Me (Intakt, 2018) with Robyn Schulkowsky

=== As sideman ===
With John Abercrombie

- Cat 'n' Mouse (ECM, 2000)
- Class Trip (ECM, 2003)
- The Third Quartet (ECM, 2006)
- Wait Till You See Her (ECM, 2008)
- Within a Song (ECM, 2012)
- 39 Steps (ECM, 2013)
- Up and Coming (ECM, 2017)

With the Toshiko Akiyoshi

- Tuttie Flutie (Discomate, 1980)
- European Memoirs (Victor, 1982)
- Toshiko Akiyoshi Trio (Eastworld, 1983)

With Laurie Anderson

- Strange Angels (Warner Bros., 1989)
- Bright Red (Warner Bros., 1994)
- The Ugly One with the Jewels (Warner Bros., 1995)
- Life on a String (Elektra Nonesuch, 2001)

With Tim Berne

- Miniature (JMT, 1988)
- Tim Berne's Fractured Fairy Tales (JMT, 1989)
- I Can't Put My Finger on It (JMT, 1991)
- Diminutive Mysteries (Mostly Hemphill) (JMT, 1993)

With David Bowie

- Outside (Arista/BMG, 1995)

With Jakob Bro

- Streams (ECM, 2016)

With Uri Caine

- Urlicht / Primal Light (Winter & Winter, 1997)

With James Carter

- Chasin' the Gypsy (Atlantic, 2000)
- Heaven on Earth (Half Note, 2009)

With Anthony Coleman

- Sephardic Tinge (Tzadik, 1995)

With Dave Douglas

- In Our Lifetime (New World, 1994)
- Stargazer (Arabesque, 1996)
- Soul on Soul (RCA, 2000)
- Freak In (RCA Bluebird, 2003)

With Eliane Elias

- Something for You: Eliane Elias Sings & Plays Bill Evans (Bluenote, 2007)

With Mark Feldman

- Secrets (Tzadik, 2009)

With Bill Frisell

- Lookout for Hope (ECM, 1988)
- Before We Were Born (Elektra/Musician, 1989)
- Is That You? (Elektra Nonesuch, 1990)
- Where in the World? (Elektra Nonesuch, 1991)
- Have a Little Faith (Elektra Nonesuch, 1992)
- This Land (Elektra Nonesuch, 1993)
- Go West: Music for the Films of Buster Keaton (Elektra Nonesuch, 1995)
- The High Sign/One Week (Elektra Nonesuch, 1995)
- Live (Gramavision, 1995)

With Fred Frith

- Allies (RecRec, 1996)

With Richard Galliano

- Laurita (Dreyfus, 1999)

With Jim Hall

- These Rooms (Denon, 1988)
- Hemispheres (ArtistShare, 2008) with Bill Frisell
- Conversations (ArtistShare, 2009)

With Fred Hersch

- Horizons (Concord Jazz, 1985)
- Sarabande (Sunnyside, 1987)
- The French Collection (EMI, 1989)
- The Surrounding Green (ECM, 2025)

With Haino Keiji

- An Unclear Trial: More Than This (Avant, 1998)

With Marc Johnson

- The Sound of Summer Running (Verve, 1998)
- Shades of Jade (ECM, 2005)
- Swept Away (ECM, 2012)

With Lee Konitz

- Sound of Surprise (RCA Victor, 1999)

With Steve Kuhn

- Remembering Tomorrow (ECM, 1995)
- Mostly Coltrane (ECM, 2008)
- Wisteria (ECM, 2012) with Steve Swallow

With Joe Lovano

- Flights of Fancy: Trio Fascination Edition Two (Blue Note 2000)
- Sound Prints (Blue Note, 2013 [2015])

With Pat Martino

- The Return (Muse, 1987)

With Carmen McRae

- Live at Ronnie Scott's (Pye, 1977)
- At the Great American Music Hall (Blue Note, 1977)

With Mark Murphy

- Beauty and the Beast (Muse, 1986)

With Gary Peacock

- Now This (ECM, 2015)
- Tangents (ECM, 2017)

With Enrico Pieranunzi

- New Lands (Timeless, 1984)
- Deep Down (Soul Note, 1986)
- Play Morricone (CAM Jazz, 2001)
- Current Conditions (CAM Jazz, 2003)
- Play Morricone 2 (CAM Jazz, 2003)
- Ballads (CAM Jazz, 2006)
- Live in Japan (CAM Jazz, 2007)
- As Never Before (CAM Jazz, 2008)

With Hank Roberts

- Black Pastels (JMT, 1988)

With Herb Robertson

- Transparency (JMT, 1985)
- X-Cerpts: Live at Willisau (JMT, 1987)
- Shades of Bud Powell (JMT, 1988)

With John Scofield

- Grace Under Pressure (Blue Note, 1992)

With Julian Siegel

- Live at the Vortex (Basho Records, 2008)

With John Taylor

- Rosslyn (ECM, 2003)

With Toots Thielemans

- Only Trust Your Heart (Concord, 1988)
- Do Not Leave Me (Stash, 1989)

With Roseanna Vitro

- The Time of My Life: Roseanna Vitro Sings the Songs of Steve Allen (Sea Breeze, 1999; recorded 1986)

With John Zorn

- The Big Gundown (Icon, 1985)
- Spy vs Spy (Elektra/Musician, 1989)
- Naked City (Elektra Nonesuch, 1989) with Naked City
- Torture Garden (Shimmy Disc, 1990) with Naked City
- Grand Guignol (Avant, 1992) with Naked City
- Heretic (Avant, 1992) with Naked City
- Leng Tch'e (Toy's Factory, 1992) with Naked City
- Radio (Avant, 1993) with Naked City
- Absinthe (Avant, 1993) with Naked City
- Masada: Alef (DIW, 1994) with Masada
- Masada: Beit (DIW, 1994) with Masada
- Masada: Gimel (DIW, 1994) with Masada
- Masada: Dalet (DIW, 1995) with Masada
- Masada: Hei (DIW, 1995) with Masada
- Masada: Vav (DIW, 1995) with Masada
- Filmworks III: 1990–1995 (Toys Factory, 1996)
- Masada: Zayin (DIW, 1996) with Masada
- Masada: Het (DIW, 1997) with Masada
- Masada: Tet (DIW, 1997) with Masada
- Masada: Yod (DIW, 1997) with Masada
- Filmworks IV: S&M + More (Tzadik, 1997)
- New Traditions in East Asian Bar Bands (Tzadik, 1997)
- The Circle Maker (Tzadik, 1997)
- Black Box (Tzadik, 1997) with Naked City
- Taboo & Exile (Tzadik, 1999)
- Live in Jerusalem 1994 (Tzadik, 1999) with Masada
- Live in Taipei 1995 (Tzadik, 1999) with Masada
- Live in Middelheim 1999 (Tzadik, 1999) with Masada
- Live in Sevilla 2000 (Tzadik, 2000)
- The Gift (Tzadik, 2001)
- Live at Tonic 2001 (Tzadik, 2001) with Masada
- Naked City Live, Vol. 1: The Knitting Factory 1989 (Tzadik, 2002) with Naked City
- First Live 1993 (Tzadik, 2002) with Masada
- 50th Birthday Celebration Volume 4 (Tzadik, 2004) with Electric Masada
- 50th Birthday Celebration Volume 7 (Tzadik, 2004) with Masada
- Naked City: The Complete Studio Recordings (Tzadik, 2005) with Naked City
- Electric Masada: At the Mountains of Madness (Tzadik, 2005) with Electric Masada
- 50th Birthday Celebration Volume 11 (Tzadik, 2005) with Bar Kokhba Sextet
- Sanhedrin 1994–1997 (Tzadik, 2005) with Masada
- Moonchild: Songs Without Words (Tzadik, 2005) with Moonchild Trio
- Astronome (Tzadik, 2006) with Moonchild Trio
- Six Litanies for Heliogabalus (Tzadik, 2007) with Moonchild Trio
- The Crucible (Tzadik, 2008) with Moonchild Trio
- Lucifer: Book of Angels Volume 10 (Tzadik, 2008) with Bar Kokhba Sextet
- The Dreamers (Tzadik, 2008) with The Dreamers
- Stolas: Book of Angels Volume 12 (Tzadik, 2009) with Masada Quintet
- O'o (Tzadik, 2009) with The Dreamers
- Ipsissimus (Tzadik, 2010) with Moonchild
- Ipos: Book of Angels Volume 14 (Tzadik, 2010) with The Dreamers
- Nova Express (Tzadik, 2011) with the Nova Quartet
- At the Gates of Paradise (Tzadik, 2011)
- A Dreamers Christmas (Tzadik, 2011) with The Dreamers
- Templars: In Sacred Blood (Tzadik, 2012) with Moonchild
- A Vision in Blakelight (Tzadik, 2012)
- The Concealed (Tzadik, 2012)
- Dreamachines (Tzadik, 2013) with the Nova Quartet
- The Last Judgement (Tzadik, 2014) with Moonchild
- On Leaves of Grass (Tzadik, 2014) with the Nova Quartet
- Pellucidar: A Dreamers Fantabula (Tzadik, 2015) with The Dreamers
- Andras: The Book Of Angels Volume 28 (Tzadik, 2016) with Nova Express Quintet

== Filmography ==
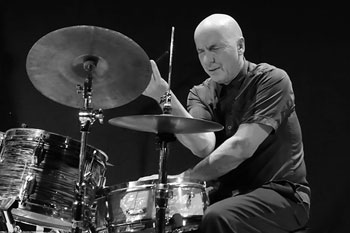
Joey Baron in Aarhus, Denmark (2014)

- Step Across the Border (RecRec, 1990) with Fred Frith
- Masada Live at Tonic 1999 (Tzadik, 2004) with Masada
- A Bookshelf on Top of the Sky: 12 Stories About John Zorn (Tzadik, 2004) with Masada
- Bill Frisell: A Portrait (Emma Franz Films, 2017)
