= The Circle Maker =

The Circle Maker: Issachar

Studio album by John Zorn
- Released: 1998
- Recorded: 1997
- Genre: Avant-garde jazz Downtown music Chamber music
- Length: 122:13
- Label: Tzadik TZ 7122
- Producer: John Zorn

John Zorn chronology
Weird Little Boy (1998)	The Circle Maker: Issachar (1998)	Downtown Lullaby (1998)

The Circle Maker: Zevulun

The Circle Maker is a double album by John Zorn featuring Zorn's Masada compositions performed by the Masada String Trio (on Disc One: Issachar) and the Bar Kokhba Sextet (on Disc Two: Zevulun) which was released in 1998 on the Tzadik label.

== Reception ==
Professional ratings
Review scores
Source	Rating
Allmusic	5/5 stars

The Allmusic review by Joslyn Layne awarded the album 5 stars stating "Zorn skeptics will find the superb and elegant music on The Circle Maker surprisingly stable and accessible... All of these musicians are accomplished in jazz and improvised music, and have performed extensively in world and/or classical settings as well. The Circle Maker is a very necessary recording for all appreciators of chamber jazz, new Jewish music, or any of these stellar musicians."

== Track listing ==
All compositions by John Zorn

- Disc One: Issachar
1. "Tahah" – 2:30
2. "Sippur" – 3:21
3. "Karet" – 1:21
4. "Hadasha" – 5:36
5. "Taharah" – 3:51
6. "Mispar" – 2:47
7. "Ratzah" – 4:36
8. "Zebdi" – 1:51
9. "Yatzar" – 8:14 - misspelled as "Yatzah" on album sleeve
10. "Malkhut" – 1:57
11. "Hodaah" – 3:49
12. "Elilah" – 3:21
13. "Meholalot" – 4:54
14. "Kochot" – 4:58
15. "Lachish" – 1:30
16. "Shidim" – 4:32
17. "Aravot" – 2:58
18. "Moshav" – 5:06
- Disc Two: Zevulun
1. "Lilin" – 6:58
2. "Hazor" – 4:45
3. "Kisofim" – 7:23
4. "Khebar" – 4:54
5. "Laylah" – 2:57
6. "Teli" – 4:14
7. "Tevel" – 4:27
8. "Eitan" – 2:02
9. "Ner Tamid" – 2:38
10. "Idalah-Abal" – 7:41
11. "Gevurah" – 6:51
- Disc One: Issachar – Recorded December 6, 1997, at Avatar Studio, New York City
- Disc Two: Zevulun – Recorded December 7, 1997, at Avatar Studio, New York City

== Personnel ==
- Disc One: Issachar – All tracks performed by the Masada String Trio
- Mark Feldman – violin
- Erik Friedlander – cello
- Greg Cohen – bass
- Disc Two: Zevulun – All tracks performed by the Bar Kokhba Sextet
- Marc Ribot – guitar
- Cyro Baptista – percussion
- Joey Baron – drums
- Mark Feldman – violin
- Erik Friedlander – cello
- Greg Cohen – bass

=== Production ===
- Produced by John Zorn
- Kazunori Sugiyama: Associate Producer
- Jim Anderson: Sound Engineer
