= Chamber jazz =

Genre of jazz

- Stylistic origins: Jazz; classical music; Celtic music; world music; folk music; Latin American music
- Cultural origins: 1960s, Germany and United States
- Typical instruments: Violins and other string instruments; saxophones; trumpets and other brass instruments; rhythm sections; guitars typically (electric guitars); oboes; double basses; pianos; mandolins; hammered dulcimers; cymbals; tablas; drums

Regional scenes
- United States and Germany

Chamber jazz is a genre of jazz involving small, acoustic-based ensembles where group interplay is important. It is influenced aesthetically by the small ensembles of chamber music in musical neoclassicism and is often influenced by classical forms of Western music, non-Western music and culture, and various folk genres such as Celtic music, Central European, or Latin American music.

American bassist John Kirby (1908-1952) is arguably the first chamber jazz musician with a sextet he led in the 1930s and '40s. However, many other early exponents originated in Europe so significant neoclassical composers of Europe, like Igor Stravinsky, are important. The German ECM Records also played a role in popularizing the genre beginning in the late 1960s. It is also noted for using instruments not normally associated with jazz. For example, chamber jazz will make use of the oboe, mandolin, cymbalum, or the tabla.

The non-Western influences or instrumentation make chamber jazz at times listed as a kind of world music. At other times the fusion of neoclassical with jazz is deemed to be new age and several albums of chamber jazz were released by Windham Hill Records. Windham Hill itself was co-founded by a musician linked to chamber jazz and was initially known for folk or world music.

The term is also used, on occasion, to simply mean the fusion of chamber music with jazz. In this case, it means something similar to third stream but without the orchestral aspect third stream leans toward. Jazz is not traditionally considered chamber music. According to the definition of "chamber music", which is defined by Chamber Music America (CMA), chamber music is "works for small ensembles of 2–10 members, playing one to a part and generally performing without a conductor." Although the term "chamber jazz" might not be accepted by all, there are still musicians who play jazz in the tradition of chamber music. There are also chamber music groups that play chamber music in a style that can be considered "jazz".

Musician Ahmad Jamal performed "Chamber Music of the New Jazz", which can be a representative music piece of chamber jazz. During recent years, chamber jazz is performed more and accepted by a larger audience.

== Notable musicians linked to chamber jazz music ==
The following have sources describing them as musicians who have performed chamber jazz. In some cases it is unclear if they agree with that description. Further many or most of these musicians are primarily known for other genres of jazz or other genres of music.

- Billy Childs
- Eddie Daniels
- Dave Douglas
- Mark Feldman
- Erik Friedlander
- Jimmy Giuffre
- Chico Hamilton – An early proponent.
- Mark Isham
- John Kirby - perhaps the first chamber jazz musician.
- Brad Mehldau
- Modern Jazz Quartet
- Meg Okura – She has been dubbed "The Queen of Chamber Jazz."
- Peter Sprague
- Russel Walder
