= New World Records =

American record label

- Parent company: Anthology of Recorded Music
- Founded: 1975
- Distributor: Albany Music Distributors
- Genre: Jazz, classical, experimental, improvised, traditional
- Country of origin: U.S.
- Location: New York City
- Official website: www.newworldrecords.org

New World Records is a record label that was established in 1975 through a Rockefeller Foundation grant to celebrate the United States Bicentennial in 1976 by producing a 100-LP anthology of American music from many genres.

In addition to this project, after 1978 New World produced new jazz by artists including Roy Eldridge, Ricky Ford, Earl Hines, Steve Kuhn, Jay McShann, Jimmy Rushing, Buddy Tate, and Cecil Taylor.

New World has released over 400 albums by a variety of artists with diverse musical backgrounds, including jazz, classical music, experimental, popular song, and traditional music. Notable releases in the label's catalogue include the Grammy Award-winning releases of Samuel Barber's opera Antony and Cleopatra in 1984; Leonard Bernstein's operetta Candide in 1986; and Ned Rorem's String Symphony/Sunday Morning/Eagles in 1989.

New World acquired and digitized the catalog of Composers Recordings, Inc. after that label folded.
