= Erik Friedlander =

American cellist and composer (born 1960)

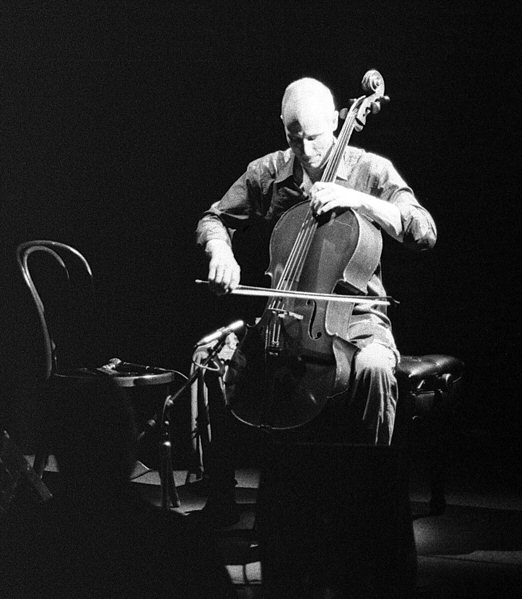
- Friedlander performing in 2007

Background information
- Born: July 1, 1960 (age 66)
- Origin: New York City, New York, U.S.
- Genres: Avant-garde jazz, classical, chamber jazz
- Occupations: Musician, composer
- Instrument: Cello
- Years active: 1980s–present
- Label: Brassland
- Website: erikfriedlander.com

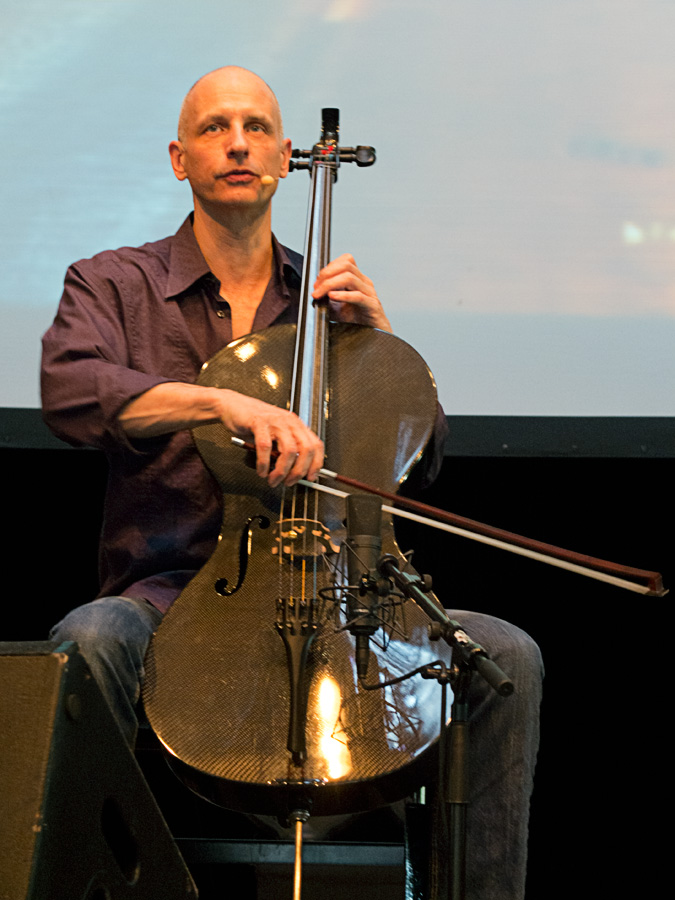
Friedlander, Moers Festival, 2012

Erik Friedlander (born July 1, 1960) is an American cellist and composer based in New York City.

A veteran of New York City's experimental downtown scene, Friedlander has worked in many contexts, but is perhaps best known for his frequent collaborations with saxophonist John Zorn.

Friedlander grew up in a home filled with art and music: his father is photographer Lee Friedlander, noted for the cover photographs he took for Atlantic Records. He is of Jewish descent from his father and of Finnish descent through his paternal grandmother. His father's fondness for R&B and jazz helped shape Friedlander's taste in music. He graduated from Columbia University in 1982.

Friedlander started playing guitar at age six and added cello two years later. Apart from his work with Zorn, Friedlander has worked with Laurie Anderson, Courtney Love, the Mountain Goats, and Alanis Morissette, and is a member of the jazz/fusion quartet Topaz.

He created the original music for the historical documentary Kingdom of David: The Saga of the Israelites.

== Discography ==
- Chimera (with Chimera) (Avant, 1995)
- The Watchman (with Chimera) (Tzadik, 1996)
- Topaz (with Topaz) (SIAM, 1999)
- Skin (with Topaz) (SIAM, 2000) also released on DVD
- Grains of Paradise (Tzadik, 2002)
- Quake (with Topaz) (Cryptogramophone, 2003)
- Maldoror (Brassland, 2003)
- Eiger (SkipStone, 2006)
- Prowl (with Topaz) (Cryptogramophone, 2006)
- Schio Duomilaquatro (Stella Nera, 2006)
- Giorni Rubati (Bip-Hop, 2006)
- Block Ice & Propane (SkipStone, 2007)
- Volac: Book of Angels Volume 8 (Tzadik, 2007) composed by John Zorn
- Broken Arm Trio (SkipStone, 2008)
- Vanishing Point (A Road Journal DVD)
- Alchemy (SkipStone, 2010)
- 50 Miniatures for Improvising Quintet (SkipStone, 2010)
- Chamber Quintet (with Marcin Oles and Bartlomiej Oles)
- Bonebridge (SkipStone, 2011)
- American Power (SkipStone, 2012)
- Claws and Wings (SkipStone, 2013)
- Nothing on Earth (SkipStone, 2014)
- Nighthawks (SkipStone, 2014)
- Illuminations (SkipStone, 2015)
- Oscalypso (SkipStone, 2015)
- Rings (SkipStone, 2016)
- Artemisia (with Throw A Glass) (SkipStone, 2018)

With John Zorn

- Redbird (Tzadik, 1995)
- Filmworks IV: S&M + More (Tzadik, 1997)
- Filmworks VI: 1996 (Tzadik, 1997)
- Filmworks VIII: 1997 (Tzadik, 1998)
- Music for Children (Tzadik, 1998)
- The String Quartets (Tzadik, 1999)
- The Big Gundown: 15th Anniversary Special Edition (Tzadik, 2000)
- Madness, Love and Mysticism (Tzadik, 2001)
- Filmworks X: In the Mirror of Maya Deren (Tzadik, 2001)
- Cobra: John Zorn's Game Pieces Volume 2 (Tzadik, 2002)
- Filmworks XII: Three Documentaries (Tzadik, 2002)
- Filmworks XIII: Invitation to a Suicide (Tzadik, 2002)
- Filmworks XIX: The Rain Horse (Tzadik, 2008)
- Filmworks XX: Sholem Aleichem (Tzadik, 2008)
- What Thou Wilt (Tzadik, 2010)
- The Concealed (Tzadik, 2012)
- Fragmentations, Prayers and Interjections (Tzadik, 2014)

As a member of Bar Kokhba

- 1998 The Circle Maker (Tzadik)
- 2005 50th Birthday Celebration Volume 11 (Tzadik)
- 2008 Lucifer: Book of Angels Volume 10 (Tzadik)

As a member of Masada String Trio

- 1998 The Circle Maker (Tzadik)
- 2002 Filmworks XI: Secret Lives (Tzadik)
- 2003 50th Birthday Celebration Volume 1 (Tzadik)
- 2005 Azazel: Book of Angels Volume 2 (Tzadik)
- 2010 Haborym: Book of Angels Volume 16 (Tzadik)

=== As sideman ===
With Laurie Anderson

- Life on a String (Nonesuch, 2001)

With Cyro Baptista

- Beat the Donkey (Tzadik, 2002)
- Banquet of the Spirits (Tzadik, 2008)
- Infinito (Tzadik, 2009)

With Uri Caine

- Wagner e Venezia (Winter & Winter, 1997)

With Nels Cline

- Lovers (Blue Note, 2016)

With Sylvie Courvoisier

- Abaton (ECM, 2003)

With Dave Douglas

- Five (Soul Note, 1996)
- Convergence (Soul Note, 1999)

With Mark Feldman

- Book of Tells (Enja, 2001)

With Benny Golson

- One Day, Forever (Arkadia Jazz, 1999 [2001])

With Myra Melford

- The Same River, Twice (Gramavision, 1996)
- Above Blue (Arabesque, 1999)

With Mike Patton

- Pranzo Oltranzista (Tzadik, 1997)

With Jamie Saft

- A Bag of Shells (Tzadik, 2010)

With Wadada Leo Smith

- Lake Biwa (Tzadik, 2004)

With Dar Williams

- Mortal City (Razor & Tie, 1996)

== Filmography ==
- Kingdom of David: The Saga of the Israelites (2003)
- Spade (2014)
- Thoroughbreds (2017)
- Oh Lucy! (2017)
