= Cyro Baptista =

Brazilian-born percussionist (born 1950)

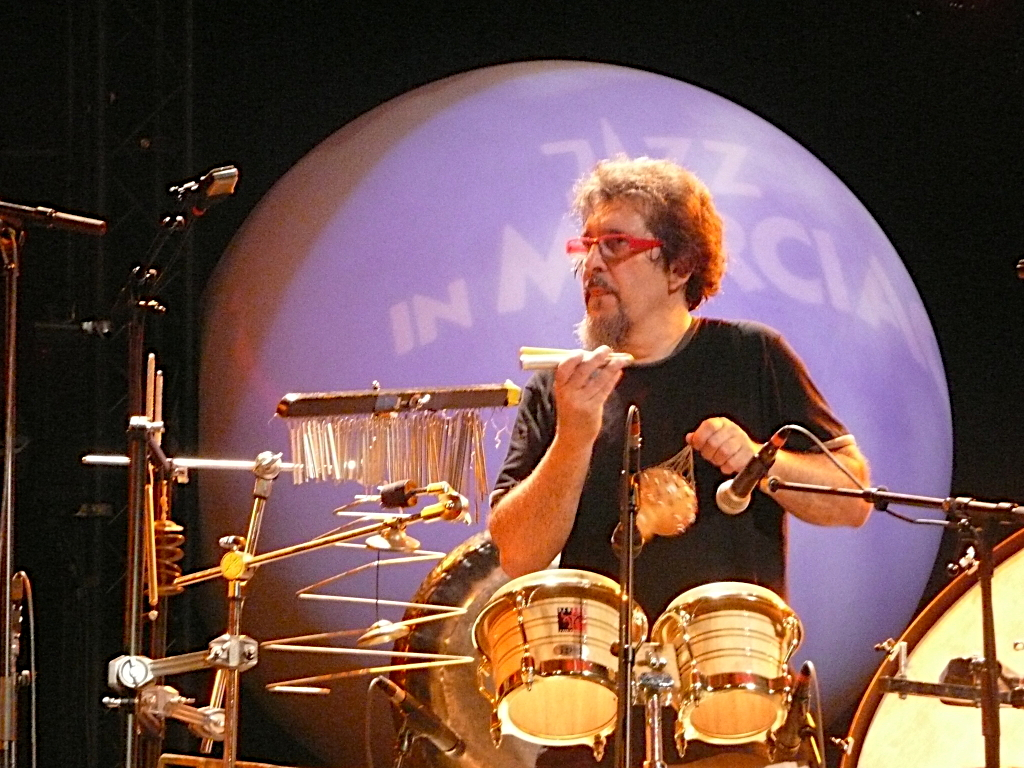
- Baptista performing in 2008

Background information
- Born: Cyro Baptiste Ciari; December 23, 1950 (age 75); São Paulo, Brazil
- Genres: Jazz, jazz fusion, world music
- Occupation: Musician
- Instrument: Percussion
- Years active: 1970s–present
- Labels: Avant, Tzadik
- Website: www.cyrobaptista.com

Cyro Baptista (born December 23, 1950) is a Brazilian-born percussionist in jazz and world music. He creates many of the percussion instruments he plays.

== Career ==
Born in São Paulo, Brazil, Baptista arrived in the U.S. in 1980 with a scholarship to Creative Music Studio in Woodstock, New York.

During the 1980s, he worked on films with John Zorn and appeared on Zorn's albums in the 1990s. Also in the '90s, he appeared on albums by Marisa Monte, Holly Cole, and Cassandra Wilson. In 1997 he released his first solo album, Vira Loucos, with cover versions of music by Heitor Villa-Lobos. The album was recorded with Marc Ribot and Nana Vasconcelos and released by Avant, a label owned by Zorn. He was a member of Zorn's band Dreamers.

He recorded with pianist Herbie Hancock on his album Possibilities. He recorded and performed worldwide with Hancock's Grammy award-winning Gershwin's World. He toured with Yo-Yo Ma's Brazil Project and appeared on the Obrigado Brazil, which won two Grammy awards. He collaborated with Wynton Marsalis and the Lincoln Center Jazz Orchestra for a Brazilian Carnival modern jazz concert. For over two years, he toured with Paul Simon and appeared on his Concert in Central Park album. He has toured worldwide with Sting.

Baptista has also worked with Paul Simon, Trey Anastasio, Laurie Anderson, Badi Assad, Derek Bailey, Gato Barbieri, Daniel Barenboim, Kathleen Battle, David Byrne, Dr. John, Brian Eno, Melissa Etheridge, Stephen Kent, Ivan Lins, Bobby McFerrin, Medeski Martin & Wood, Milton Nascimento, Robert Palmer, Carlos Santana, Tim Sparks, Spyro Gyra, James Taylor, Michael Tilson Thomas, and Caetano Veloso

Baptista formed Beat the Donkey, a percussion and dance ensemble. The name comes from a Portuguese expression for "let's do it" or "let's go". The band's personnel and genre are in flux. Sometimes it includes Ribot and Zorn. The music can be rock, funk, Brazilian, or Balkan.

== Other work ==
Baptista appeared in Nicolas Humbert and Werner Penzel's 1990 documentary film Step Across the Border about Fred Frith, He composed music for programs for the children's television network Nickelodeon.

Baptista conducts educational rhythm workshops in a variety of formats. He has provided presentations for elementary school children and professional musicians. He has conducted workshops and master classes at Berklee College of Music, The New School. Mannes College of Music (New York City), New World Symphony Orchestra (Miami) and Rimon School of Music (Tel-Aviv, Israel).

== Awards and honors ==
The album Beat the Donkey was picked by Jon Pareles of The New York Times as one of the ten best alternative albums of 2002. Readers of JAZZIZ magazine and DRUM magazine voted it Best Brazilian CD of the Year and named Baptista Best Percussionist of 2002. Down Beat magazine's 51st annual Critics' Poll selected Baptista as 'Rising Star' in percussion. A documentary about Beat the Donkey that was a recorded WGBH-TV in Boston program won three New England EMMY Awards in 2002.

Baptista has performed on five Grammy award-winning albums: Yo-Yo Ma's Obrigado Brazil, Cassandra Wilson's Blue Light 'Til Dawn, The Chieftains' Santiago, Ivan Lins' A Love Affair, and Herbie Hancock's Gershwin's World.

In 2009 Baptista won a Fellow Award in Music from United States Artists.

== Instruments ==
Baptista plays alfaia, agogo bells, apito, bandora, bass drum, bell tree, berimbau, bongos, bottles, Chinese bells, cabasa, caja, caxixi, clay drum, conga, cowbell, cuica, cymbals, drums, finger cymbals, gong, kalimba, maracas, mark tree, pandeiro, rototom, repinique, shaker, shekere, snare drum, surdo, triangle, tabla, talking drum, tamborim, tambourine, temple block, timbales, tom-toms, udu, washboard, water gong, waterphone, whistle, and wood block.

== Discography ==
=== As leader ===
- Vira Loucos (Avant, 1997)
- Beat the Donkey (Tzadik, 2002)
- Love the Donkey (Tzadik, 2005)
- Banquet of the Spirits (Tzadik, 2008)
- Infinito (Tzadik, 2009)
- Sunshine Seas (RareNoise, 2016)
- Caym: Book of Angels Volume 17 (Tzadik, 2011)
- Bluefly (Tzadik, 2016)

=== As guest ===
With Trey Anastasio

- Alive Again (Elektra, 2002)
- Plasma (Elektra, 2003)
- Shine (Elektra, 2005)
- Bar 17 (Rubber Jungle, 2006)

With Gabrielle Roth

- Tongues (Raven, 1995)
- Zone Unknown (Raven, 1997)
- Tribe (Raven, 2000)

With Cassandra Wilson

- Blue Light 'Til Dawn (Blue Note, 1993)
- New Moon Daughter (Blue Note, 1995)
- Belly of the Sun (Blue Note, 2002)

With John Zorn

- The Big Gundown (Nonesuch, 1986)
- Filmworks III: 1990–1995 (Nonesuch, 1992)
- Filmworks 1986–1990 (Tzadik, 1996)
- Filmworks II: Music for an Untitled Film by Walter Hill (Tzadik, 1996)
- Filmworks V: Tears of Ecstasy (Tzadik, 1996)
- Filmworks VI: 1996 (Tzadik, 1996)
- Filmworks IV: S&M + More (Tzadik, 1997)
- Filmworks VII: Cynical Hysterie Hour (Tzadik, 1997)
- The Circle Maker (Tzadik, 1998)
- Taboo & Exile (Tzadik, 2000)
- Filmworks IX: Trembling Before G-d (Tzadik, 2000)
- The Gift (Tzadik, 2001)
- Filmworks X: In the Mirror of Maya Deren (Tzadik, 2001)
- Filmworks XII: Three Documentaries (Tzadik, 2002)
- Cobra: John Zorn's Game Pieces Volume 2 (Tzadik, 2002)
- The Satyr's Play / Cerberus (Tzadik, 2011)
- A Vision in Blakelight (Tzadik, 2012)
- Mount Analogue (Tzadik, 2012)
- Pellucidar: A Dreamers Fantabula (Tzadik, 2015)

With others

- Geri Allen – Eyes in the Back of Your Head (Blue Note, 1997)
- Gabriela Anders – Wanting (Warner Brothers, 1998)
- Laurie Anderson – Bright Red (Warner, 1994)
- Laurie Anderson – Strange Angels (Warner, 1994)
- Peter Apfelbaum – It Is Written (ACT, 2005)
- Joseph Arthur – Our Shadows Will Remain (Vector, 2004)
- Badi Assad – Rhythms (Chesky, 1995)
- Derek Bailey – Cyro (Incus, 1987)
- Derek Bailey & Cyro Baptista – Derek (Amulet, 2006)
- Bar Kokhba Sextet – Bar Kokhba (Tzadik, 2005)
- Gato Barbieri – Qué Pasa (Sony, 1997)
- Daniel Barenboim – Brazilian Rhapsody (Teldec, 2000)
- Kathleen Battle – So Many Stars (Sony, 1995)
- Tony Bennett – Duets: An American Classic (Columbia, 2006)
- Ronnie Bird – One World (PEM, 1992)
- Chris Botti – First Wish (Verve, 1995)
- Edie Brickell – Picture Perfect Morning (Geffen, 1994)
- Dee Dee Bridgewater – Prelude to a Kiss: The Duke Ellington Album (Phillips, 1996)
- David Byrne – Rei Momo (Warner Bros., 1989)
- James Carter – Chasin' the Gypsy (Atlantic, 2000)
- Tommy Cecil – Samba for Felix (Slider, 1999)
- Tony Cedras – Vision Over People (Gorilla, 1994)
- Nels Cline – Macroscope (Mack Avenue, 2014)
- Holly Cole – Temptation (Metro Blue, 1995)
- Eliane Elias and Randy Brecker – Amanda (Passport Jazz, 1985)
- Criara – Behind the Sky (EMI, 1997)
- Corin Curschellas – Voices of Romantsch (MGB, 1997)
- Susana Baca – Eco de Sombras (Luaka Bop, 2000)
- The Chieftains – Santiago (BMG Classics, 1996)
- Dominique Dalcan – Ostinato (Island, 1998)
- Dip in the Pool – The Sea of Serenity (Epic, 1993)
- Dr. John – Duke Elegant (Blue Note, 2000)
- The Dreamers – A Dreamers Christmas (Tzadik, 2011)
- The Dreamers – Ipos: Book of Angels Volume 14 (Tzadik, 2010)
- Electric Masada – 50th Birthday Celebration Volume 4 (Tzadik, 2004)
- Electric Masada – Electric Masada: At the Mountains of Madness (Tzadik, 2005)
- Manfredo Fest – Oferenda (Concord, 1993)
- Fobia – Leche (BMG Mexico, 1993)
- Serge Gainsbourg – Great Jewish Music: Serge Gainsbourg (Tzadik, 1998)
- Gibran – Dialogos Intestinales (Urukungolo, 2001)
- Len & Vani Greene – Luminosity (2011)
- Janet Grice – The Muse (Optimism, 1989)
- Andy Haas – Arnhem Land (Avant, 1997)
- Herbie Hancock – Gershwin's World (Verve, 1998)
- Herbie Hancock – Possibilities (Starbucks, 2005)
- Janis Ian – Revenge (Boomerang, 1995)
- Janis Ian – Janis Ian (Windham Hill, 1997)
- Javon Jackson – For One Who Knows (Blue Note, 1995)
- Javon Jackson – Good People (Blue Note, 1997)
- Bob James – Playin' Hooky (Warner, 1998)
- Richard Leo Johnson – Language (Blue Note, 2000)
- Geoff Keezer – Turn Up the Quiet (Sony, 1997)
- Arto Lindsay – Mundo Civilizado (None, 1996)
- Ivan Lins – A Love Affair (Telarc International Corporation, 2000)
- Frank London – Science at Work (Tzadik, 2002)
- Lionel Loueke – Virgin Forest (ObliqSound, 2006)
- Lionel Loueke – The Journey (Aparte, 2018)
- Romero Lubambo – Brazilian Nights (Q Records, 2001)
- Jon Madof's Zion80 – Zion80 (Tzadik, 2013)
- Chuck Mangione – The Hat's Back (Gates Music, 1994)
- Harold Mabern – To Love and Be Loved (Smoke Sessions, 2017)
- Herbie Mann – Opalescence (Kokopelli, 1994)
- Billy Martin – Drop the Needle/ Illy B Eats (Amulet, 2002)
- Billy Martin – Socket (Amulet, 2005)
- Nilson Matta – Walking With My Bass (Blue Toucan Music, 2006)
- Bobby McFerrin – Beyond Words (Blue Note, 2002)
- Maureen McGovern – Out of This World (Sterling, 1996)
- Hendrik Meurkens – In a Sentimental Mood (A Records, 1999)
- Jason Miles – Music of Weather Report (Telarc, 2000)
- Jason Miles – Miles to Miles (Narada, 2005)
- Jacky Terrasson – Push (Concord, 2010)
- Marisa Monte – Mais (EMI, 1994)
- Jean-Louis Murat – Mustang (Virgin, 1999)
- New York Voices – NYV Sings Paul Simon (BMG, 1997)
- Ojoyo – Forward Motion (Ojoyo, 1996)
- Ojoyo – Ojoyo Plays SafroJazz (Ojoyo, 2002)
- Robert Palmer – Don't Explain (EMI, 1990)
- Robert Palmer – Robert Palmer (EMI, 1992)
- Clara Ponty – The Embrace (Phillips, 1999)
- Howard Prince – Double Take (Cat's Paw, 1997)
- Paul Rebhan – Colors (Carmel, 1991)
- Paula Robison – Brasileirinho (Omega, 1993)
- Paula Robison – Rio Days, Rio Night (Arabesque, 1998)
- Philippe Saisse – Next Voyage (Verve, 1997)
- Peter Scherer – Very Neon Pet (Metro Blue, 1995)
- Peter Scherer – Cronologia (Tzadik, 1996)
- Paul Shaffer – The World's Most Dangerous Party (SBK, 1993)
- Paul Simon – Concert in the Park (Warner, 1991)
- Phoebe Snow – I Can't Complain (House of Blues, 1998)
- Richard Stoltzman – Danza Latina (BMG, 1998)
- Richard Stoltzman – World Beat Bach (BMG, 2000)
- Sisters of Glory – Good News in Hard Times (Warner, 1995)
- Tim Sparks – At the Rebbe's Table (Tzadik, 2002)
- Tim Sparks – Tanz (Tzadik, 2000)
- Spyro Gyra – Dreams Beyond Control (GRP Records, 1996)
- Spyro Gyra – The Deep End (Heads Up International, 2004)
- Bob Telson – Calling You (Warner, 1993)
- Bob Telson – La Vida Segun Muriel (VCC Polygram, 1998)
- Trio da Paz – Black Orpheus (Kokopelli, 1994)
- Trilogia – Wheels Within Wheels (TDK, 1992)
- Nana Vasconcelos – Rain Dance (Island, 1989)
- Nana Vasconcelos – Fragments – Modern Tradition (Tzadik, 1997)
- Roseanna Vitro – The Time of My Life (Sea Breeze, 1999)
- Grover Washington Jr. – Soulful Strut (Columbia, 1996))
- Grover Washington Jr. – To Grover with Love (Atlantic, 2001)
- Kazumi Watanabe – Mo' Bop III (Hybrid Records, 2006)
- David Watson with Beat the Donkey – Skirl (Avant, 1999)
- Yo-Yo Ma – Obrigado Brazil (Sony Classical, 2003)
- Yo-Yo Ma – Obrigado Brazil Live in Concert (Sony, 2004)
- Tom Ze – The Hips of Tradition (Luaka Bop, 1992)
