= Downtown music =

Style of music developed in the 1960s in downtown Manhattan

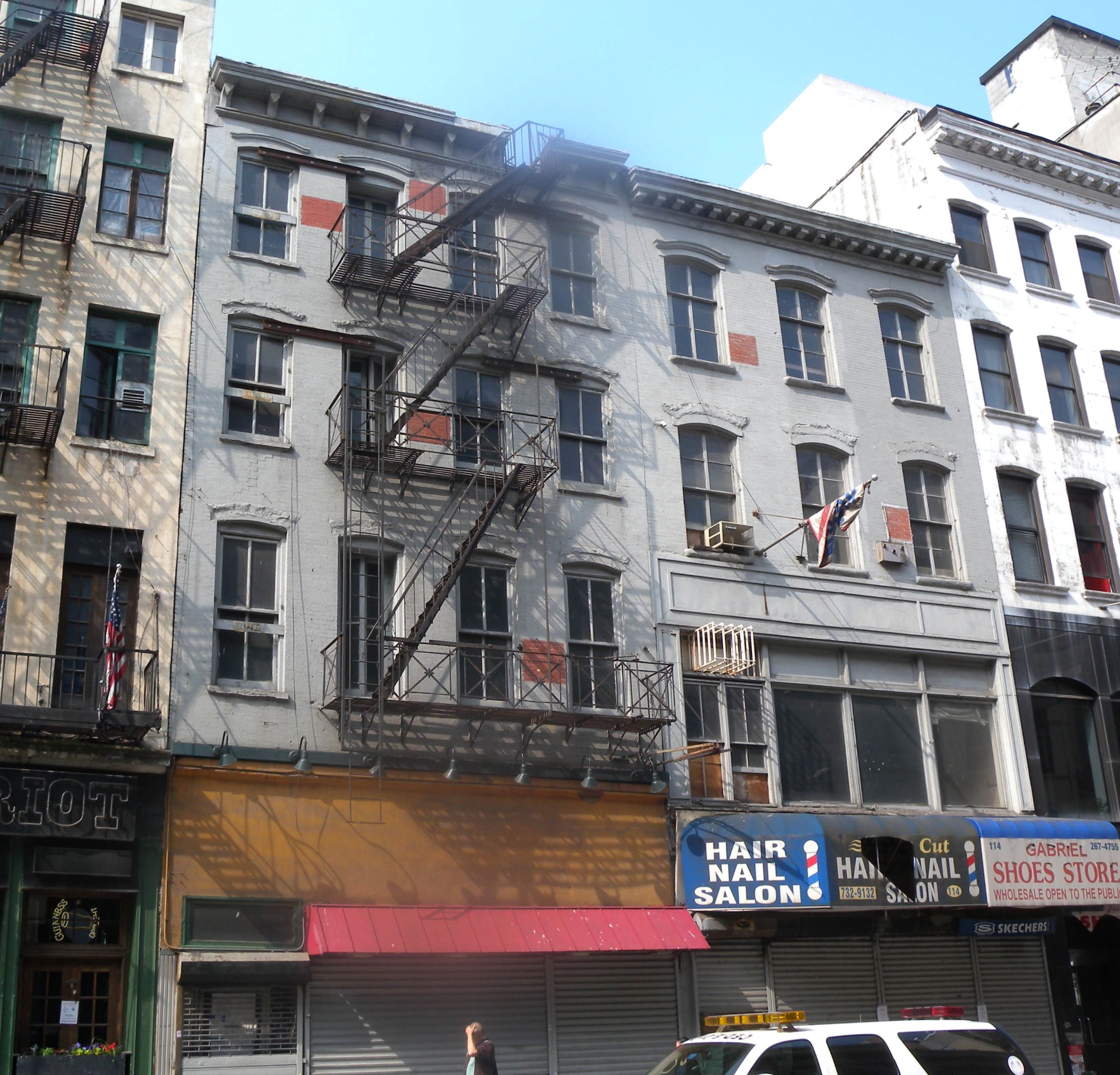
112 Chambers Street

Downtown music is a subdivision of American music, closely related to experimental music, which developed in downtown Manhattan in the 1960s.

== History ==
The scene the term describes began in 1960, when Yoko Ono, one of the early Fluxus artists, opened her loft at 112 Chambers Street, in a part of Lower Manhattan later named Tribeca, to be used as a performance space for a series curated by La Monte Young and Richard Maxfield. Prior to this, most classical music performances in New York City occurred "uptown" around the areas that the Juilliard School at Lincoln Center and Columbia University would soon occupy. Ono's gesture led to a new performance tradition of informal performances in nontraditional venues such as lofts and converted industrial spaces, involving music much more experimental than that of the more conventional modern classical series Uptown. Spaces in Manhattan that have supported Downtown music from the 1960s on include the Judson Memorial Church, The Kitchen, Phill Niblock's Experimental Intermedia Foundation, La Monte Young and Marian Zazeela's MELA Foundation, Dia Art Foundation, Harvestworks, Roulette, the Knitting Factory, ABC No Rio, Dance Theater Workshop, Tonic, the Gas Station, Tellus Audio Cassette Magazine, the Paula Cooper Gallery, John Zorn's Downtown Music Gallery and The Stone (music space), among others. Brooklyn Academy of Music has also shown a predilection for composers from the Downtown scene.

== Character ==
Downtown music is not distinguished by any particular principle, but rather by what it does not do: it does not confine itself to the ensembles, performance tradition, and musical rhetoric of European classical music, nor to the commercially defined conventions of pop music. The only thing that all Downtown music might be said to have in common is that, at least at the time of its original appearance, it was too unusual – by dint of excessive length, excessive stasis, excessive simplicity, excessive extemporaneity, consonance, noisiness, vernacular reference, or other purported excessive infractions – to have been considered "serious" modern music by proponents of "uptown" music. Another generalization one could point to is an embrace of the creative attitudes of John Cage, though this is not universal. Some Downtown music, particularly that of Philip Glass, Steve Reich, John Zorn, and Morton Feldman, has subsequently become widely acknowledged within the more mainstream history of music.

== Varieties ==
More than a continuous scene, Downtown music has resembled a battlefield on which, from time to time, various groups have reigned ascendant. In chronological order of dominance, the following movements have been prominent Downtown:

- Conceptualism – starting with the Fluxus artists, who made pieces from brief instructions ("the short form") or concepts. For instance, La Monte Young's "Draw a straight line and follow it"; Robert Watts' Trace, in which the musicians set fire to the music on their music stands; Yoko Ono's Wall Piece, in which performers bang their heads against the wall; or Nam June Paik's classic "Creep into the vagina of a living whale".
- Minimalism – a style of music that began with the repetition of short motifs, sometimes going out of phase due to slight differences of speed, and crescendoed into a movement of simple diatonic music of clearly defined linear processes. Steve Reich and Philip Glass became the public face of the movement, but the original minimalists (La Monte Young, Tony Conrad, John Cale, Charlemagne Palestine, Phill Niblock) were less characterized by their music's prettiness and accessibility than by its tremendous length, volume, and attention-challenging stasis.
- Performance art – starting with the enigmatic solo text/music pieces of Laurie Anderson, which often made innovative (even subversive) use of electronic technology, many Downtown artists developed an often humorous or thought-provoking style of solo performance with conceptualist overtones. This scene coexisted with minimalism, and due to the dearth of funding opportunities for Downtown composers, many of them still pursue genres of solo performance.
- Art rock or experimental rock – this is a term with several different meanings, depending on one's milieu, but two are most relevant to Downtown music: 1. originally, music made by visual artists, presumably musical amateurs, often tending toward surreal theater, as in the early performances of Glenn Branca and Jeffrey Lohn; and 2. subsequent to Rhys Chatham's influence, a transferral of minimalism to "rock" instruments, resulting in static pieces played on electric guitars, generally with a backbeat. Groups like DNA, Sonic Youth, Live Skull and Swans arose from this (and the no wave) movement.
- Free improvisation – originating with Terry Riley and Pauline Oliveros, this scene took over Downtown in the early 1980s, under the leadership of John Zorn and Elliott Sharp. This music, celebrating extemporaneity, flourished in a city in which rehearsal space was expensive and difficult to come by, and provided an outlet for many jazz-trained/-centered musicians tired of jazz performance conventions.
- Postminimalism – a style of music based on a steady beat and diatonic harmony, less linear or obvious than minimalism but taking over its ensemble concept of amplified chamber groups. Postminimalism was more a far-flung national movement than anything specific to Manhattan, but William Duckworth and Elodie Lauten are examples of New York-based postminimalists.
- Totalism – another style emerging from minimalism but taking it in the direction of rhythmic complexity and rock-inspired beat momentum. Postminimalism and totalism were both bolstered by the emergence, starting in 1987, of the Bang on a Can festival, curated by Julia Wolfe, David Lang, and Michael Gordon.

The above list of movements and idioms is far from exhaustive – in particular, it omits the continuous history of electronics in Downtown music, which have tended toward process-oriented and interactive music rather than fixed compositions. The history of sound installations should be taken into account, along with the more recent advent of DJing as an art form. Likewise, despite its origin in New York musical politics, "Downtown" music is not solely specific to Manhattan; many major cities such as Chicago, San Francisco, even Birmingham, Alabama have alternative, Downtown music scenes.

== Related terms ==
There is a considerable overlap between Downtown music and what is more generally called experimental music, especially as that term was defined at length by composer Michael Nyman in his influential book Experimental Music: Cage and Beyond. Nyman opposes the term to avant-garde, as generally being American/British versus Continental, experimental music being more open to process, surprises, and accidents and less focused on the artistic personality. In this respect, as a general descriptive, and without reference to any particular scene, experimental and Downtown have sometimes been used synonymously. Another, even more coextensive term is new music, which took on currency following the "New Music New York" festival presented by The Kitchen in 1979, which visibly showcased the music referred to as Downtown; the term remained in widespread use during the years of the New Music America festival (1979–1990). Due to its obvious and inconvenient applicability to many types of music, use of "new music" as describing a specific type of contemporary composition has fallen off in recent years.

== See also ==
- Mudd Club
- Tellus Audio Cassette Magazine
- Tier 3
- No wave
- Noise Fest
- Minimalism (music)
- Noise music
- Post-punk
