= Mike Patton discography =

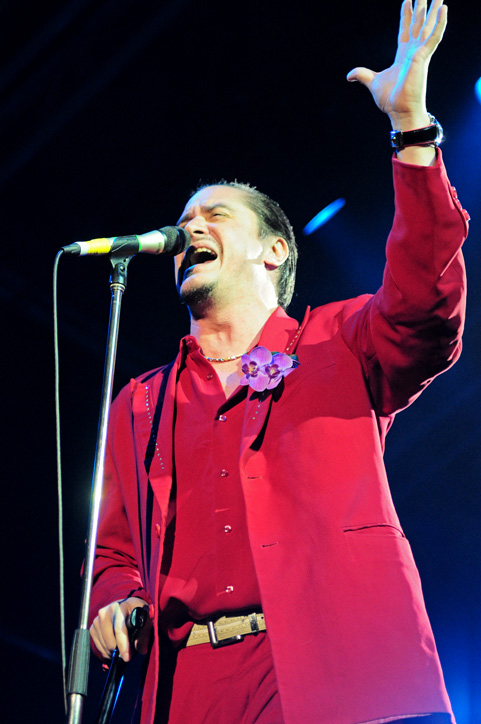
- Patton performing with Faith No More in 2010
- Studio albums: 32
- Extended plays: 1
- Soundtrack albums: 4
- Live albums: 2
- Compilation albums: 7
- Tribute albums: 0
- Singles: 15
- Video albums: 15
- Music videos: 19
- Other appearances: 60+
- Official demos: 4

Mike Patton is an American singer, best known for providing lead vocals for Faith No More along with Mr. Bungle, Fantômas, Peeping Tom, Tomahawk, Lovage and more. In addition to recording and working with these bands, he has also been involved in many side projects and collaborations. Patton is most frequently known as a vocalist, but has also produced, played various musical instruments, has composed soundtracks, done voice over work and has done some acting.

Patton's first recordings were demo tapes made while in high school as part of his band Mr. Bungle; the first, The Raging Wrath of the Easter Bunny was released in 1986. On the strength of these demo tapes, Patton was invited to sing vocals for rock band Faith No More. His first album for Faith No More, The Real Thing, was nominated for a Grammy Award and it contained the band's most successful single to date, "Epic".

Having gained fame with Faith No More, Mr. Bungle were signed to Warner Bros. Records. Their self-titled debut, although focusing on heavy metal, featured an eclectic mix of funk, free jazz, circus music and various other genres mixed with numerous samples, was released in 1991. The following year saw the release of Faith No More's next album, Angel Dust, the first Patton had musical influence on. It is Faith No More's most successful album to date and is widely considered to be the band's magnum opus.

In 1995, Patton released three albums—King for a Day... Fool for a Lifetime with Faith No More, which also saw the release of three singles; Disco Volante with Mr. Bungle; and Elegy with John Zorn, performing vocals all three. He has since released music under different projects and in a variety of different styles such as crooning, falsetto, death growls, rapping, chanting, mouth music, beatboxing and scatting, among others; leading critic Greg Prato call Patton "one of the most versatile and talented singers in rock music".

On April 1, 1999, Patton co-founded the independent record label Ipecac Recordings with Greg Werckman. He has released most of his subsequent output on that label. His directorial debut was in 1993, with an abstract film titled Video Macumba. His first solo album, Adult Themes for Voice, was released in 1996. His first role as actor was in the 2004 film Firecracker. He has released 32 studio albums, 1 EPs, 2 live albums, 15 video albums, composed 4 soundtracks and has made more than 60 other appearances, providing vocals for single tracks. He has worked with such artists as Sepultura, Dan the Automator, John Zorn, The Dillinger Escape Plan, The X-Ecutioners, Merzbow, John Kaada, The Melvins, Dub Trio, Björk, Zu and many more.

== Faith No More ==
=== Studio albums ===
Year	Title	Peak chart positions												Certifications (sales thresholds)
Year	Title	US	AUS	AUT	FIN	FRA	GER	NLD	NOR	NZ	SWE	SWI	UK	Certifications (sales thresholds)
1989	The Real Thing: Released: July 3, 1989; Label: Slash (#9 25878-2)	11	2	—	16	—	—	—	—	48	38	—	30	US: Platinum; UK: Silver; CAN: Platinum
1992	Angel Dust: Released: June 8, 1992; Label: Slash (#9 26785-2)	10	4	4	5	4	8	22	7	6	18	9	2	US: Gold; UK: Silver; CAN: Platinum
1995	King for a Day... Fool for a Lifetime: Released: March 25, 1995; Label: Slash (#9 45723-2)	31	2	9	2	5	8	8	6	3	5	7	5	UK: Gold
1997	Album of the Year: Released: June 3, 1997; Label: Slash (#9 46629-2)	41	1	5	4	17	2	31	5	1	11	16	7	AUS: Platinum
2015	Sol Invictus: Released: May 19, 2015; Label: Reclamation! Records, Ipecac	15	2	—	—	10	4	7	—	6	—	—	6	
"—" denotes albums that were released but did not chart.

=== Live albums ===
Year	Title	Peak chart positions	
Year	Title	AUS	UK
1991	Live at the Brixton Academy: Released: February 4, 1991; Label: Slash (#828 238-2)	93	20

=== Singles ===
Year	Title	Peak chart positions													Album
Year	Title	US	US ^{Main}	US ^{Mod}	AUS	AUT	FIN	FRA	NLD	NOR	NZ	SWE	SWI	UK	Album
1989	"From Out of Nowhere"	—	—	—	83	—	—	—	—	—	—	—	—	23	The Real Thing
1990	"Epic" (US:Gold)	9	25	2	1	—	—	—	—	—	2	—	—	25	The Real Thing
1990	"Falling to Pieces"	92	28	12	26	—	—	—	—	—	16	—	—	41	The Real Thing
1992	"Midlife Crisis"	—	32	1	31	9	—	—	—	—	32	—	—	10	Angel Dust
1992	"A Small Victory"	—	—	11	84	—	—	—	—	—	—	—	—	29	Angel Dust
1992	"Everything's Ruined"	—	—	—	63	—	—	—	—	—	—	—	—	28	Angel Dust
1993	"Easy"	58	—	—	1	—	—	—	10	2	6	11	9	3	Angel Dust
1993	"Another Body Murdered" (Note: Collaboration with Boo-Yaa T.R.I.B.E.; guitar by Billy Gould)	—	—	—	—	—	—	—	—	—	41	—	—	26	Judgment Night
1995	"Digging the Grave"	—	—	—	12	—	—	23	—	11	16	39	—	16	King for a Day... Fool for a Lifetime
1995	"Ricochet"	—	—	—	58	—	—	—	—	—	—	—	—	27	King for a Day... Fool for a Lifetime
1995	"Evidence"	—	—	—	27	—	—	—	42	—	38	—	—	32	King for a Day... Fool for a Lifetime
1997	"Ashes to Ashes"	—	23	—	8	—	7	—	—	14	39	—	50	15	Album of the Year
1997	"Last Cup of Sorrow"	—	14	—	66	—	—	—	—	—	32	—	—	51	Album of the Year
1997	"Stripsearch"	—	—	—	83	—	—	—	—	—	—	—	—	—	Album of the Year
1998	"This Town Ain't Big Enough for Both of Us" (Note: Collaboration with Sparks)	—	—	—	69	—	—	—	—	—	—	—	7	40	Plagiarism
1998	"I Started a Joke"	—	—	—	58	—	—	—	—	—	38	—	—	49	Who Cares a Lot? The Greatest Hits
2014	"Motherfucker"	—	—	—	—	—	—	—	—	—	—	—	—		Sol Invictus
2015	"Superhero"	—	—	—	—	—	—	—	—	—	—	—	—		Sol Invictus
2015	"Sunny Side Up"	—	—	—	—	—	—	—	—	—	—	—	—	—	Sol Invictus
2016	"Cone of Shame"	—	—	—	—	—	—	—	—	—	—	—	—	—	Sol Invictus
"—" denotes singles that were released but did not chart.

=== Music videos ===
Year	Title	Director
1989	"From Out of Nowhere" (Note: Video appears on Video Croissant (1993); Who Cares a Lot? The Greatest Videos (1998) and Double Feature: Live at the Brixton Academy, London (You Fat Bastards) / Who Cares a Lot? The Greatest Videos (2006))	Doug Freel
1990	"Epic"	Ralph Ziman
1990	"Falling to Pieces"	Ralph Ziman
1990	"Surprise! You're Dead!"	Billy Gould
1992	"Midlife Crisis"	Kevin Kerslake
1992	"A Small Victory"	Marcus Nispel
1992	"Everything's Ruined"	Kevin Kerslake
1992	"Easy"	Barry McGuire
1993	"Another Body Murdered" (Note: Video has not appeared in any official release.)	Marcus Raboy
1995	"Digging the Grave" (Note: Video appears on Who Cares a Lot? The Greatest Videos (1998) and Double Feature: Live at the Brixton Academy, London (You Fat Bastards) / Who Cares a Lot? The Greatest Videos (2006))	Marcus Raboy
1995	"Ricochet"	Alex Hemming
1995	"Evidence"	Walter A. Stern
1997	"Ashes to Ashes"	Tim Royes
1997	"Last Cup of Sorrow"	Joseph Kahn
1997	"Stripsearch"	Philipp Stölzl
1998	"I Started a Joke"	Vito Rocco
2015	"Sunny Side Up"	Joe Lynch
2015	"Separation Anxiety"	finchlynch
2016	"Cone Of Shame"	Goce Cvetanovski

=== Compilations ===
Year	Title	Peak chart positions					Certifications
Year	Title	AUS	AUT	NOR	NZ	UK	Certifications
1998	Who Cares a Lot? The Greatest Hits: Released: November 24, 1998; Label: Slash, London (#556 052-2) (#556057-2); Label: Slash, Reprise (#9 47149-2)	4	46	26	10	37	AUS: Platinum; UK: Silver
2003	This Is It: The Best of Faith No More: Released: January 28, 2003; Label: Rhino, WEA (#R2 76099)	—	—	—	—	—	
2005	Epic and Other Hits: Released: 2005; Label: Warner Bros. (#73245)	—	—	—	—	—	
2006	The Platinum Collection: Released: January 10, 2006; Label: Warner Bros. (#5101-11734-2)	—	—	—	—	38	
2008	The Works: Released: March 31, 2008; Label: Rhino (#5144-27750-2)	—	—	—	—	—	
2009	The Very Best Definitive Ultimate Greatest Hits Collection: Released: June 8, 2009; Label: Rhino	—	—	—	37	—	
2010	Midlife Crisis: The Very Best of Faith No More: Released: September 20, 2010; Label: Music Club Deluxe	—	—	—	—	—	
"—" denotes albums that were released but did not chart.

=== Other appearances ===
Year	Title	Format	Notes
1991	Bill & Ted's Bogus Journey: Music from the Motion Picture	Soundtrack	Features "The Perfect Crime"
1993	Judgment Night	Soundtrack	Features "Another Body Murdered" (collaboration with Boo-Yaa T.R.I.B.E.)
1995	Metallurgy, Vol. 1	Misc. compilation	Features "Engove (Caffeine)"
1998	Plagiarism	Album by Sparks	Featured on "This Town Ain't Big Enough for Both of Us" and "Something for the Girl with Everything"
1998	Du riechst so gut '98	EP by Rammstein	Features a Faith No More remix of "Du Riechst So Gut"

=== Videography ===
Year	Title
1990	You Fat Bastards: Live at the Brixton Academy: Released: August 20, 1990; Label: Slash; US certification: Gold
1993	Video Croissant: Released: February 2, 1993; Label: Slash, Warner Bros.
1999	Who Cares a Lot? The Greatest Videos: Released: February 23, 1999; Label: Slash, Reprise, Rhino
2006	Double Feature: Live at the Brixton Academy, London (You Fat Bastards) / Who Cares a Lot? The Greatest Videos: Released: May 23, 2006; Label: Slash, Reprise, Rhino

== Mr. Bungle ==
=== Studio albums ===
Year	Album details	Peak chart positions					
Year	Album details	US	US Heat.	US Ind.	AUS	NOR	UK
1991	Mr. Bungle: Released: August 13, 1991; Label: Warner Bros.; Format: CD	—	—	—	—	—	—
1995	Disco Volante: Released: October 15, 1995; Label: Warner Bros.; Format: CD	113	4	—	40	—	—
1999	California: Released: July 13, 1999; Label: Warner Bros.; Format: CD	144	7	—	—	—	—
2020	The Raging Wrath of the Easter Bunny Demo: Released: October 30, 2020; Label: Ipecac; Format: CD; Digital download; streaming	30	—	6	6	—	53
"—" denotes a release that did not chart.

=== Live albums ===
Year	Album details
2021	The Night They Came Home: Released: June 11, 2021; Label: Ipecac; Format: CD; Digital download; streaming

=== Single ===
Year	Title	Album
1991	"Quote Unquote"	Mr. Bungle
1995	"Platypus"	Disco Volante
2020	"USA"	USA – Single
2020	"Raping Your Mind"	The Raging Wrath of the Easter Bunny Demo
2020	"Eracist"	The Raging Wrath of the Easter Bunny Demo
2020	"Sudden Death"	The Raging Wrath of the Easter Bunny Demo

=== Music videos ===
Year	Title	Album	Notes
1991	"Quote Unquote"	Mr. Bungle	Video directed by Kevin Kerslake
2020	"Raping Your Mind"	The Raging Wrath of the Easter Bunny Demo	Video directed by Eric Livingston
2020	"Eracist"	The Raging Wrath of the Easter Bunny Demo	Video directed by Derrick Scocchera
2020	"Sudden Death"	The Raging Wrath of the Easter Bunny Demo	Video directed by Derek Cianfrance

=== Demos ===
Year	Title	Notes
1986	The Raging Wrath of the Easter Bunny	
1987	Bowel of Chiley	unofficially re-released in 1991 and 1997 as Bowl of Chiley.
1988	Goddammit I Love America!	
1989	OU818	unofficially re-released as "Excrement (The Lost Demos)".

=== Compilations/other ===
Year	Title	Format	Notes
1992	Mi Stroke Il Cigaretto	Live EP	Vinyl 7-inch featuring "The Stroke" and a collage of "Dead Goon" and "The Thing Strikes" from a show in Chicago, Illinois on March 26, 1992. Semi-bootleg limited to 500 copies. Sold at the 1995 shows.
1992	Soil X Samples 6	Warner Bros. Records promo 7" vinyl	Features Sudden Death.
1994	Trademark Of Quality	Warner Bros. Records promo CD	Features Raping Your Mind.
2002	D.R.I. Tribute - We Don't Need Society!	Dirty Rotten Imbeciles tribute album	Features a cover of I Don't Need Society
2021	Disco Volante Era Improv at The Bomb Factory	Limited edition of 4 lathe cut vinyl	

== Fantômas ==
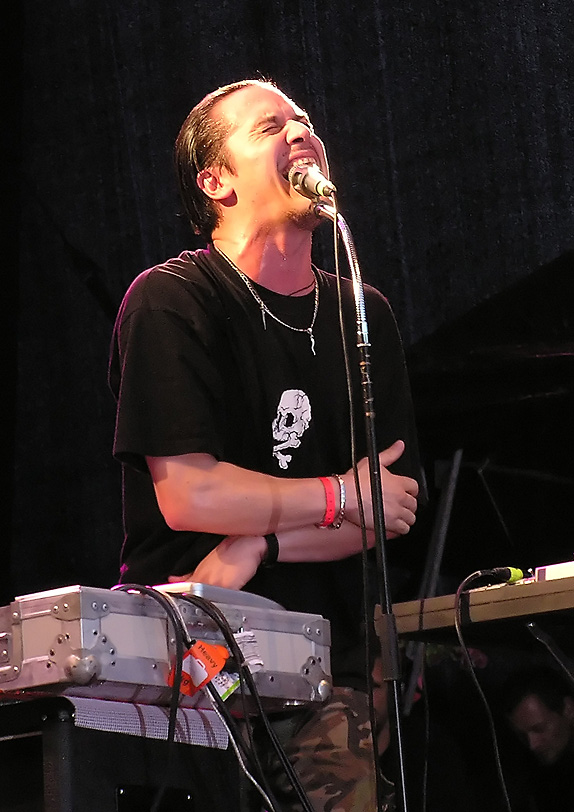
Mike Patton performing with Fantômas in Norway (2005)

=== Studio albums ===
Year	Album details	Peak chart positions					
Year	Album details	US	US Heat.	US Ind.	AUS	FRA	SWE
1999	Fantômas: Released: April 27, 1999; Label: Ipecac (1); Format: CD	—	—	—	—	—	—
2001	The Director's Cut: Released: July 10, 2001; Label: Ipecac (17); Format: CD	—	—	30	18	—	—
2004	Delìrium Còrdia: Released: January 27, 2004; Label: Ipecac (45); Format: CD	183	7	7	—	118	—
2005	Suspended Animation: Released: April 5, 2005; Label: Ipecac (65); Format: CD	153	7	12	49	129	43
"—" denotes a release that did not chart.

=== Live albums ===
Year	Album details	US Heat.	US Ind.
2002	Millennium Monsterwork 2000 (Note: Collaboration with The Melvins, credited as The Fantômas/Melvins Big Band.): Released: April 1, 2002; Label: Ipecac (19); Format: CD	45	21
2011	The Director's Cut: A New Year's Revolution: Released: September 6, 2011; Label: Ipecac (129); Format: digital download	—	—

=== Split albums ===
Year	Album details
2005	Animali in Calore Surriscaldati con Ipertermia Genitale/Cat in Red (with Melt-Banana): Released: August 2005; Label: Unhip (5); Format: Picture mini-CD, LP
2013	Sugar Daddy Live Split Series (with Melvins): Released: December 2013; Label: Amphetamine Reptile Records; Format: Vinyl, 12", Limited Edition

=== Box set ===
Year	Album details	Notes
2014	Wunderkammer: Released: 16 December 2014; Label: Ipecac; Format: 5xLP+Cassette	Includes the following albums on vinyl: Fantômas; The Director's Cut; Delìrium Còrdia; Suspended Animation; Includes the following on cassette: A copy of Mike Patton's Fantômas demo tape.

=== Videography ===
Year	Album details
2008	Live from London 2006: Released: August 26, 2008; Label: Ipecac (102); Format: DVD
2011	The Director's Cut Live: A New Year's Revolution: Released: September 6, 2011; Label: Ipecac (129); Format: DVD

=== Other appearances ===
Year	Title	Format	Notes
1998	Great Jewish Music: Marc Bolan	Misc. Compilation	Features Chariot Choogle
2002	Wanna Buy a Monkey?	Album by Dan the Automator	Features Fantômas music on Intro
2003	The Unknown Masada	Misc. Compilation	Features Zemaraim
2005	Who Is It/Where Is The Line Mixes 12" Vinyl	Single by Björk	Features a Fantômas remix of Where Is The Line

== Tomahawk ==
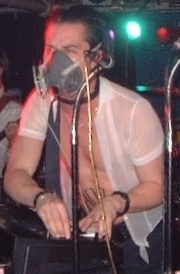
Mike Patton performing with Tomahawk

=== Studio albums ===
Year	Album details	Peak chart positions					
Year	Album details	US	US Heat.	US Ind.	AUS	NOR	UK
2001	Tomahawk: Released: October 30, 2001; Label: Ipecac (18); Format: CD	—	31	20	37	—	—
2003	Mit Gas: Released: May 6, 2003; Label: Ipecac (40); Format: CD	137	3	7	28	17	98
2007	Anonymous: Released: June 19, 2007; Label: Ipecac (89); Format: CD	158	2	12	32	31	—
2013	Oddfellows: Released: January 29, 2013; Label: Ipecac	69	—	9	—	—	—
2021	Tonic Immobility: Released: March 26, 2021; Label: Ipecac	—	—	—	—	—	—
"—" denotes a release that did not chart.

=== Singles ===
Year	Title	Album
2003	"Rape This Day"	Mit Gas
2007	"Sun Dance"	Anonymous
2012	"Stone Letter"	Oddfellows
2014	"M.E.A.T."	Unreleased tracks from Oddfellows
2021	"Business Casual"	Tonic Immobility
2021	"Dog Eat Dog"	Tonic Immobility
2021	"Predators and Scavengers	Tonic Immobility

=== Box set ===
Year	Set details
2012	Eponymous To Anonymous: Released: April 21, 2012; Label: Ipecac (135); Format: 3XLP; Contains a 4th empty spot to receive the vinyl version of Oddfellows

=== Music videos ===
Year	Title	Album	Director
2003	"Rape This Day"	Mit Gas	Gary Smithson
2012	"Stone Letter"	Oddfellows	Vince Forcier
2013	"Oddfellows"	Oddfellows	Vince Forcier
2014	"South Paw"	Oddfellows	Vince Forcier
2021	"Dog Eat Dog"	Tonic Immobility	Eric Livingston
2021	"Predators and Scavengers	Tonic Immobility	Diego Cumplido

== tētēma ==
=== Studio albums ===
Year	Album details
2014	Geocidal: Released: December 9, 2014; Label: Ipecac
2020	Necroscape: Released: April 3, 2020; Label: Ipecac

== Peeping Tom ==
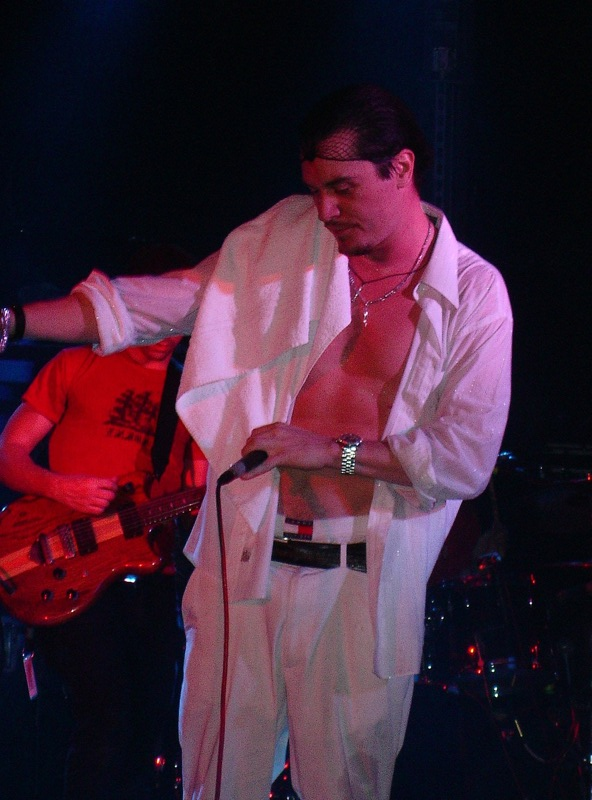
Mike Patton performing with Peeping Tom in Milan

=== Studio albums ===
Year	Album details	Peak chart positions									
Year	Album details	US	US Heat.	US Ind.	AUS	BEL (FL)	BEL (WA)	FIN	FRA	NOR	UK
2006	Peeping Tom: Released: May 30, 2006; Label: Ipecac (77); Format: CD, LP	103	1	3	12	34	86	31	115	22	136

=== Singles ===
Year	Single	US Alt.	Album
2006	"Mojo"	40	Peeping Tom
2007	"We're Not Alone"	—	Peeping Tom
"—" denotes a release that did not chart.

=== Music video ===
Year	Title	Album	Director
2006	Mojo	Peeping Tom	Matt McDermitt

== Dead Cross ==
=== Studio albums ===
Year	Album details
2017	Dead Cross: Released: August 4, 2017; Label: Ipecac, Three One G; Format: CD, LP
2018	Dead Cross (EP): Released: May 2, 2018; Label: Ipecac; Format: EP
2022	II: Released: October 28, 2022; Label: Ipecac, Three One G; Format: CD, LP, Cassette Tape

=== Music videos ===
Year	Title	Album	Notes
2017	Seizure And Desist	Dead Cross (album)	Video by Eric Livingston
2017	Obedience School	Dead Cross (album)	Video by Dennis Bersales
2017	Church Of The Motherfuckers	Dead Cross (album)	Video by Michael Panduro
2018	My Perfect Prisoner	Dead Cross (EP)	Video by Eric Livingston
2018	Shillelagh (Panicker Remix)	Dead Cross (EP)	Video by Eric Livingston
2020	Rise Above (Black Flag (band) cover)		Video by Paula Lombardo, the Lonely Rager and Becky DiGiglio
2020	Skin Of A Redneck	Dead Cross (EP)	Video by Kay Otto
2022	Reign Of Error	II (album)	Video by Displaced/Replaced, Band members drawn by Stomp The Holy Bones
2022	Heart Reformer	II (album)	Video by Dark Details
2022	Christian Missile Crisis	II (album)	Video by Displaced/Replaced

=== Other appearances ===
Year	Title	Format	Notes
2019	Blast B/W Uncrushable - EP	EP by Kool Keith	Features Uncrushable (Dead Cross Mashup)

== With John Zorn ==
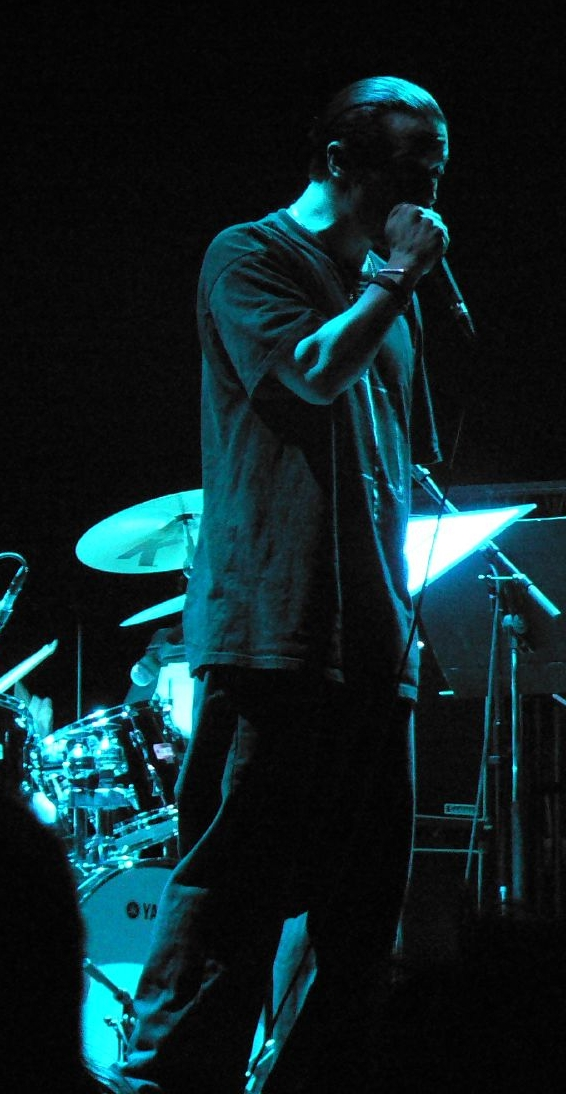
Mike Patton performing as part of the Moonchild Trio.

=== Studio albums ===
Year	Title	Format	Notes
1992	Elegy	Studio album by John Zorn	Features Patton on vocals
1999	Taboo & Exile	Studio album by John Zorn	Features Patton on "Bulls-Eye"
2000	The Big Gundown (15th Anniversary Edition)	Studio album by John Zorn	Features Patton on "The Ballad of Hank McCain"
2001	The Gift	Studio album by John Zorn	Features Patton on "Bridge to the Beyond"
2002	IAO	Studio album by John Zorn	Features Patton on "Leviathan"
2005	The Stone: Issue One	Live album by Zorn/Douglas/Patton/Laswell/Burger/Perowsky	Features Patton on vocals
2011	A Dreamers Christmas	Studio album by John Zorn	Features Patton on "The Christmas Song"
2014	The Song Project Vinyl Singles Edition	Limited edition vinyl box-set by John Zorn	Features Patton's vocals on "Flying Blind", "Perfect Crime", "Para Borrar Tu Andar", "Do Not Let Us Forget", "Burn", "The Man In The Blue Mask", "Assassin's Bay"
2015	The Song Project Live at Le Poisson Rouge	Live album of The Song Project	Features Patton's vocals on "Flying Blind", "Perfect Crime", "Para Borrar Tu Andar", "Do Not Let Us Forget", "Burn", "The Man In The Blue Mask", "Assassin's Bay"

=== Hemophiliac ===
Year	Title	Format
2002	Hemophiliac	Studio album by Hemophiliac (Limited Edition of 2500 copies)
2004	50th Birthday Celebration Volume 6	Live album by Hemophiliac

=== Moonchild Trio ===
Year	Title	Format	Notes
2006	Moonchild: Songs Without Words	Album composed by John Zorn	Features Patton, Joey Baron and Trevor Dunn
2006	Astronome	Album composed by John Zorn	Features Patton, Baron and Dunn
2007	Six Litanies for Heliogabalus	Album composed by John Zorn	Features Patton, Baron, Dunn and additional performers
2008	The Crucible	Album composed by John Zorn	Features Patton, Baron, Dunn and additional performers
2010	Ipsissimus	Album composed by John Zorn	Features Patton, Baron, Dunn and additional performers
2012	Templars: In Sacred Blood	Album composed by John Zorn	Features Patton, Baron, Dunn, John Medeski and additional performers
2014	The Last Judgment	Album composed by John Zorn	Features Patton, Baron, Dunn and John Medeski

=== Other ===
Year	Title	Format	Notes
1998	Weird Little Boy	Studio album by Weird Little Boy	Featuring Patton on drums and vocals
2003	Voices in the Wilderness	Tribute album to Masada	Features Patton on "Kochot"
2005	50th Birthday Celebration Volume 12	Live album by Painkiller	Features Patton on vocals
2005	Naked City: The Complete Studio Recordings	Compilation album by Naked City	Features Patton on "Grand Guignol (version vocale)"

== Solo ==
=== Studio albums ===
Year	Title
1996	Adult Themes for Voice
1997	Pranzo Oltranzista
2010	Mondo Cane

=== Film scores ===
Year	Title
2008	A Perfect Place
2009	Crank: High Voltage
2011	The Solitude of Prime Numbers
2013	The Place Beyond the Pines
2018	1922

== Collaborations ==
=== Albums ===
Year	Title	Artist	Notes
1999	She	Maldoror	Collaboration album between Patton and Masami Akita (Merzbow)
2001	Music to Make Love to Your Old Lady By	Lovage	Dan the Automator-led project and featuring Jennifer Charles among others.
2002	Irony Is a Dead Scene	The Dillinger Escape Plan with Mike Patton	This EP features Patton on main vocals, as well as percussion and samples.
2004	Romances	Kaada/Patton	Collaboration album with John Erik Kaada.
2005	General Patton vs. The X-Ecutioners	General Patton vs. The X-Ecutioners	Collaboration album with Patton and The X-Ecutioners
2012	Laborintus II	Mike Patton / Ictus Ensemble	Collaboration album with Patton and Ictus Ensemble, composed by Luciano Berio
2014	Geocidal	tētēma	Collaboration album with Anthony Pateras
2016	Nevermen	Nevermen	Collaboration album between Patton, Tunde Adebimpe and Doseone
2016	Bacteria Cult	Kaada/Patton	Collaboration album with John Erik Kaada
2019	Corpse Flower	Mike Patton / Jean-Claude Vannier	Collaboration album with Jean-Claude Vannier.
2020	Necroscape	tētēma	Collaboration album with Anthony Pateras
2025	AVTT/PTTN	AVTT/PTTN	Collaboration album with The Avett Brothers

=== Videography ===
Year	Title	Artist	Notes
2007	Live	Kaada/Patton	Performance by Patton and John Erik Kaada at the Roskilde Festival 2005

=== Music videos ===
Year	Title	Artist	Notes
2001	Book of the Month	Lovage	"Stroker Ace" also had a video, but did not feature Patton.
2014	Tenz	tētēma	Video by Sabina Maselli
2016	Mr Mistake	Nevermen	Video created and hand drawn by Sarina Nihei
2016	Imodium	Kaada/Patton	Contains footage from the short film "Isac Is Still Sleeping" directed by Alexandru Ponoran.
2019	Chansons D'Amour	Mike Patton / Jean-Claude Vannier	Video by Eric Livingston
2019	A Schoolgirl's Day Watch	Mike Patton / Jean-Claude Vannier	Video by Nino Del Padre, features footage from the 1962 low-budget classic film Carnival of Souls.
2020	Haunted On The Uptake	tētēma	Visualizer createdy Oleg Rooz, Sculptures by Talitha Kennedy
2020	Wait Till Mornin	tētēma	Video by Sabina Maselli
2020	Human Fly (The Cramps Cover)	Zeus! featuring Mike Patton	Video by Displaced/Replaced
2020	Speak Spanish Or Die	Mike Patton / Scott Ian / Charlie Benante / Dan Lilker	Video by Piero Medone, Audio by Mathias Cugat
2025	Eternal Love	AVTT/PTTN	Video by Neighborhoods Apart
2025	Heaven's Breath	AVTT/PTTN	Video by Neighborhoods Apart
2025	Dark Night Of My Soul	AVTT/PTTN	Video by Neighborhoods Apart
2026	Look At Me	Jehnny Beth featuring Mike Patton	Video by Jehnny Beth

== Filmography ==
=== As a musician ===
Year	Title	Artist	Notes
2002	A Bookshelf on Top of the Sky: 12 Stories About John Zorn	Claudia Heuermann	Contains footage of Patton performing in a project with (or for) John Zorn
2004	The Inner or Deep Part of an Animal or Plant Structure	Björk	Shows the making of Medúlla, including parts which Patton worked on.

=== As talent ===
Year	Title	Role	Notes
1993	Video Macumba	Director/Editor	Short film compiled by Mike Patton containing abstract and extreme footage
2004	Wamego: Making Movies Anywhere	Himself/David & Frank	Documentary on the making of Firecracker
2005	Firecracker	Actor (David & Frank)	Feature film starring Patton in dual roles as an alcoholic brother and freak show ringleader.
2007	I Am Legend	Voice Actor (Creature Vocals)	
2008	Metalocalypse: Snakes 'n' Barrels II	Voice Actor (Rikki Kixx)	
2010	Bunraku	Voice Actor (The Narrator)	
2016	The Absence of Eddy Table	Voice Actor (Eddy Table)	
2020	Word Of The Day	The Lonely Rager	Mike Patton's quarantine alter ego giving 30 Spanish lessons after his lockdown performance of Speak Spanish Or Die with members of Stormtroopers Of Death.

=== As composer ===
These releases are Patton's work solely as composer. Soundtracks featuring Patton as a part of other bands are listed in those bands' respective categories.

Year	Soundtrack	Film / Series	Notes
2008	A Perfect Place: Original Motion Picture Soundtrack	A Perfect Place	
2009	Crank: High Voltage: Original Motion Picture Soundtrack	Crank: High Voltage	
2011	The Solitude of Prime Numbers	The Solitude of Prime Numbers	
2013	The Place Beyond the Pines	The Place Beyond the Pines	
2018	1922 (Original Motion Picture Soundtrack)	1922	
2019		NOS4A2 (TV series)	Music for the main title sequence and the first episode

== Video games ==
Year	Title	Role
2007	Portal (video game)	Anger Core vocals
2007	The Darkness (video game)	The Darkness character voice
2008	Left 4 Dead	Zombie vocals
2009	Bionic Commando (2009 video game)	Nathan Spencer character voice
2009	Left 4 Dead 2	Zombie vocals
2012	The Darkness 2	The Darkness character voice
2016	Edge of Twilight – Return to Glory	Vocals for Lithern and Creatures

2022 Teenage Mutant Ninja Turtles: Shredder's Revenge Vocals for 'TMNT Theme Song'

== Other appearances ==
Year	Track	With	Original Release	Notes
1988	Alien Mother	Kevyn Dymond, Mark Shafer	Play Something Else	Vocals. Also features Trey Spruance, Trevor Dunn and Danny Heifetz of Mr. Bungle on various tracks.
1994	Psychoanalytwist	Milk Cult	"Burn or Bury"	Vocals
1996	All tracks	Plainfield	"She's Not My Daughter, She's My Wife!"	Producer
1996	Lookaway	Sepultura	"Roots"	Vocals
1997	She's Gone Away	Trey Spruance, Michael Peloquin, William Winant, David Slusser	"Great Jewish Music: Burt Bacharach"	Vocals and keyboards.
1997	Ford Mustang	Solo	"Great Jewish Music: Serge Gainsbourg"	Vocals and all instruments
1997	The Man in the Blue Slip, Not Your Girl	Bob Ostertag	"Fear No Love"	Vocals
1997	Mine, Lookaway (Master Vibe Mix)	Sepultura	"Blood-Rooted"	Vocals
1997	The Art Of Fist Fucking I	House of Discipline	"AngelicA 97"	Vocals, Electronics
1997	The Art Of Fist Fucking II	House of Discipline	"AngelicA 97"	Vocals, Electronics
1997	Romance For A Choking Man/Woman	Marie Goyette	"AngelicA 97"	Vocals, Electronics
1997	Cudegokalalumosospasashatetéwaot	Collaboration with various artists	"AngelicA 97"	Vocals, Electronics
1998	Area 877 [Phoenix Mix]	Melt-Banana	"Charlie"	Patton's vocals for this track have been re-sampled by Melt-Banana in other tracks. See album page for more info.
1998	The Waste	Sepultura	"Against" (single)	Vocals. A reworked version of "Kamaitachi" from the Against album. Later appeared on the 1999 "Tribus" EP
1999	Infinito	Tin Hat Trio	"Memory Is An Elephant"	Vocals
1999	Procura O Cara	Sepultura	"No Coração dos Deuses" soundtrack	Vocals
1999	Song Drape 7 "I Come"	Jerry Hunt	"Song Drapes"	Vocals
2000	G.I. Joe	Melvins	"The Crybaby"	Vocals, samples, guitar and percussion
2000	Music of the Night	Neil Hamburger	"Great Phone Calls"	Vocals
2000	Secrets 4 Sale	Kid 606	"Down with the Scene"	Vocals
2002	Six Pack	Mother Superior	"Rise Above: 24 Black Flag Songs to Benefit the West Memphis Three"	Vocals
2004	I Am The Dead, Doorway To The Sun, Innocent Eye, Crystal See, Marriage Of Days	Eyvind Kang	"Virginal Co Ordinates"	Vocals, electronics
2004	Pleasure Is All Mine, Where Is The Line	Björk	"Medúlla"	Vocals.
2004	Are You Down With It?	Handsome Boy Modeling School	"White People"	Vocals
2004	Circle A	Kid606	"The End of the Fear of God"	Vocals
2005	Where Is The Line (Fantômas Mix)	Björk	"Who is It/Where is the Line" cancelled single	Remixer as Fantômas
2005	All tracks	Ennio Morricone	"Crime and Dissonance"	Associate Producer, Ennio Morricone compilation album
2005	Toto Angelica, It's Not My Fault	Alvin Curran	"Toto Angelica"	Uses excerpts of Patton's Angelica Festival 1997 performance
2005	Maritime (Mike Patton remix)	Isis	"Oceanic Remixes/Reinterpretations"	Remixer
2005	11th Ave Freakout Pt 2	Odd Nosdam	"Burner"	Vocals
2005	Tutto Diventerà Rosso	Corleone	"Wei-Wu-Wei"	Vocals
2005	Mine (Andy Wallace Mix)	Sepultura	"Roots (25th Anniversary Reissue)"	Vocals
2006	Long Vein of the Voice	Subtle	"Wishingbone"	Vocals
2006	Not Alone	Dub Trio	"New Heavy"	Vocals. Re-titled We're Not Alone as a remix on the Peeping Tom album.
2006	Ballad of a Thin Man	Jamie Saft Trio	"Trouble – The Jamie Saft Trio Plays Bob Dylan"	Vocals
2006	Julia	Carla Hassett	"Quero Saber"	Vocals. Cover of The Beatles' song of the same name
2007	Andegavanses, Rabianara, Inquisitio, Lamentatio, Aquilas	Eyvind Kang	"Athlantis"	Vocals
2007	How to Vibrate (Mike Patton Remix)	Foetus	"Vein"	Remixer
2008	No Flag	Dub Trio	"Another Sound Is Dying"	Vocals
2008	Larynx	Praxis	"Profanation (Preparation for a Coming Darkness)"	Vocals
2008	Dracula Cha Cha	The Tango Saloon	"Transylvania"	Vocals
2008	Fire - Ikuma	Tagaq	"Auk/Blood"	Vocals
2008	Bird's Eye	Serj Tankian and Marc Streitenfeld	"Bird's Eye (single)"	Vocals. Recorded for the film Body of Lies. Released as a single, but does not appear on the soundtrack.
2009	Soulympics, Orc	Zu	"Carboniferous"	Vocals
2009	Lost Weekend	Qemists	"Join The Q"	Vocals. Remixes include "Hot Pink Delorean Remix", "Killer on the Dancefloor Remix", "The Qemists Got Your Money Remix" and a radio edit.
2009	Atlas Face	Umläut	"Umläut"	Vocals
2009	Unbalanced Pieces	Soulsavers	"Broken"	Backing Vocals
2010	Unknown tracks	Alan Moore & Mitch Jenkins	"Unearthing Box Set"	Patton contributes to the score
2010	Did You Miss Me (live), September Song (live)	The Young Gods with the Lausanne Sinfonietta	"20th Anniversary Show - Montreux Jazz Festival"	Vocals
2011	Catch My Heart	Bohren & der Club of Gore	"Beileid"	Vocals
2011	Planemo	The Book of Knots	"Garden of Fainting Stars"	Vocals
2011	Helium Reprise	Tin Hat Trio	"360" (soundtrack)	Vocals
2011	Putting On The Blitz	Ben Watkins	unreleased	Vocals. Featured in the closing credits of the film Bunraku.
2012	La Chanson de Jacky	Secret Chiefs 3	"La Chanson de Jacky/The Western Exile 7"	Vocals
2012	Prairie Fire	Guano Padano	"2"	Vocals
2012	Used To Think	Pillowfight	"Pillowfight"	Vocals
2013	City Rising From the Ashes	Deltron 3030	"Deltron 3030: Event II"	Vocals
2013	La Chanson de Jacky	Secret Chiefs 3	"Book Of Souls: Folio A"	Vocals. Same recording as "La Chanson de Jacky/The Western Exile 7", released digitally
2013	Kostnice	The Orchestra Of Futurist Noise Intoners	"The Orchestra Of Futurist Noise Intoners (A Performa Commission)"	Composition
2013	Variations of Julia	Carla Hassett	"Variations of Julia" single	Vocals. Remix of the 2006 release. Cover of The Beatles' song of the same name.
2013	Lookin' For The Man	André Moraes	3.33	Vocals. Vocal recording reused from the song "Procura O Cara" from the "No Coração dos Deuses" Soundtrack with different instrumentation.
2014	Put Your Head Down	Got a Girl	"I Love You But I Must Drive Off This Cliff Now"	Vocals
2015	I Could Be	Vincent & Mr. Green	"Smash Up"	Vocals
2016	Suicide Is Painless, His Arm Was Her Leg, Dioxide Is Painless	Void Manes and hepa.Titus	"Suicide Is Painless"	Vocals. Cover of The M*A*S*H movie theme song.
2016	Win, I'm Not In Love	Mark Kozelek	"Mark Kozelek Sings Favorites"	Backing Vocals
2016	City Rising From the Ashes	Deltron 3030	"Deltron 3030: Live"	Vocals
2017	How Sad How Lovely	Alain Johannes	"Vanity of Vanities - A Tribute to Connie Converse"	Vocals. Cover of the Connie Converse song of the same name.
2018	Luna A Sol	Alain Johannes Trio	"Luna A Sol"	Vocals
2019	Everything's Alright	Neil Hamburger	"Still Dwelling"	Vocals
2020	Human Fly	Zeus	"Really Bad Music for Really Bad People: The Cramps as Heard Through the Meat Grinder of Three One G"	Vocals. Cover of The Cramps song of the same name.
2021	Hydrocephalus Epilogue	Stian Carstensen	"Musical Sanatorium"	Vocals
2022	Teenage Mutant Ninja Turtles Theme	Jb Hanak, Cedric Hanak	"Teenage Mutant Ninja Turtles: Shredder's Revenge" Soundtrack	Vocals. Song was originally revealed in 2021 as part of a promotional trailer
2024	Kool Aide	Team Sleep	"Team Sleep" Record Store Day vinyl re-release	Vocals. Previously titled Kool-Aid Party; recorded in 2005 for the album's original release, but was initially not included.
2026	Look At Me	Jehnny Beth	"Look At Me"	Vocals
2026	Paradise Island, Superfun! TV Spot, Total Recall	The Avalanches	"No Bad Memories"	Vocals, spoken word.
