= The Place Beyond the Pines (soundtrack) =

The Place Beyond the Pines (Original Motion Picture Soundtrack)

Soundtrack album by Mike Patton and various artists
- Released: March 26, 2013
- Recorded: 2012–2013
- Genre: Film soundtrack; film score; classical
- Length: 56:06
- Label: Milan
- Producer: Mike Patton

Mike Patton chronology
Laborintus II (2012)	The Place Beyond the Pines (2013)	Corpse Flower (2019)

The Place Beyond the Pines (Original Motion Picture Soundtrack) is the soundtrack to the 2013 film of the same name directed by Derek Cianfrance. It consisted of an original score composed by Mike Patton, and contributions from The Cryin' Shames, Arvo Pärt, Ennio Morricone and Bon Iver.

== Development ==
In January 2012, it was reported that Mike Patton has been roped in as the composer for The Place Beyond the Pines. Cianfrance had been a fan of Patton's work since the 1990s and described his work as "cinematic". When he gave the script to Patton, the latter "understood the haunted qualities of the story" and eventually gave him freedom for specific scene. Patton did not see the whole film before and after writing the score. He would write a cue that runs for 5–10 minutes for a 30 second scene, so that he could explore the film in a musical way. Eventually for visual cues, Patton briefed on costumes and locations to decipher the images and complement them. Patton described writing an underscore as a challenge due to his works on film soundtracks and albums, which were music in the foreground that demands attention. Cianfrance recalled Patton's music as the soul of the film, which was instantly part of the world where the characters were in.

== Release ==
The original soundtrack to The Place Beyond the Pines featured Patton's score as well as contributions from Arvo Pärt, Ennio Morricone, Vladimir Ivanoff along with The Cryin' Shames and Bon Iver. Milan Records released the soundtrack digitally March 26, 2013, three days prior to the film's release and in CDs on April 16. The score was further issued in vinyl LPs and released on May 7.

== Reception ==
Patrick W. Delaney of Mxdwn Music wrote "Film soundtracks are always an intriguing listen, especially when handled with the special care shown here. Patton might have the reputation of someone who stretches himself like putty, but his work suggests an auteur aesthetic which demands your respect and attention. This album is no exception and, without reinventing the wheel, gives an affecting inner working to the tone of the film it represents and serves to orchestrate and collect sounds which resemble little else out there on the musical landscape." David Rooney of The Hollywood Reporter described Patton's score as "haunting", and A. O. Scott of The New York Times called it as "effective". Tara Brady of The Irish Times called it as tremendous. Laura Kenny of The Skinny wrote "Like the movie, the music won’t let you off so easily." Ed Gonzalez of Slant Magazine reviewed that Patton's "[Angelo] Badalamenti-by-way-of-Samsara score accommodates everything from Gregorian chants to Lisa Simpson-grade jazz solos." Justin Craig of Fox News wrote that Patton's "intoxicating" score "burrows beneath the murky layers of grime and deftly guides the characters and the audience toward that final place beyond the pines."

== Track listing ==
The Place Beyond the Pines (Original Motion Picture Soundtrack)
No.	Title	Music	Length
1.	"Schenectady"	Mike Patton	2:43
2.	"Family Trees"	Mike Patton	2:03
3.	"Bromance"	Mike Patton	4:04
4.	"Forest of Conscience"	Mike Patton	3:22
5.	"Beyond the Pines"	Mike Patton	1:20
6.	"Evergreen"	Mike Patton	2:16
7.	"Misremembering"	Mike Patton	3:54
8.	"Sonday"	Mike Patton	2:25
9.	"Coniferae"	Mike Patton	1:16
10.	"Eclipse of the Sun"	Mike Patton	1:53
11.	"The Snow Angel"	Mike Patton	1:45
12.	"Handsome Luke"	Mike Patton	4:13
13.	"Please Stay"	Mike Patton ft. The Cryin' Shames	3:16
14.	"Miserere Mei"	Vladimir Ivanoff	5:29
15.	"Fratres, For Strings and Percussion"	Arvo Pärt	10:18
16.	"Ninna Nanna per Adulteri"	Ennio Morricone	3:07
17.	"The Wolves, Acts I & II"	Bon Iver	5:22
Total length:			56.06

== Release history ==
Release dates and formats for The Place Beyond the Pines (Original Motion Picture Soundtrack)
Region	Date	Format(s)	Label	Ref.
Various	March 26, 2013	Digital download; streaming	Milan	
Various	April 16, 2013	CD	Milan	
Various	May 7, 2013	vinyl	Milan	

== Release history ==
Chart (2013)	Peak position
UK Soundtrack Albums (OCC)	27
