= Ipsissimus =

Studio album by John Zorn
- Released: September 28, 2010
- Recorded: February and July 2010 (recorded and mixed)
- Length: 49:20
- Label: Tzadik
- Producer: John Zorn

Moonchild Trio chronology
The Crucible (2008)	Ipsissimus (2010)	Templars: In Sacred Blood (2012)

John Zorn chronology
Filmworks XXIV: The Nobel Prizewinner (2009)	Ipsissimus (2010)	What Thou Wilt (2010)

Professional ratings
Review scores
Source	Rating
AllMusic	3.5/5 stars

Ipsissimus is an album by American composer John Zorn. It is the fifth album to feature the "Moonchild Trio" of Mike Patton, Joey Baron and Trevor Dunn, following Astronome (2006), Moonchild: Songs Without Words (2006), Six Litanies for Heliogabalus (2007) and The Crucible (2008).

== Description from the label ==
Weaving sonic dramas around the legacies of Magick and Alchemy, Moonchild is one of Zorn's most intense and powerful projects. Active since 2006, Moonchild has released four CDs speaking directly to young, open minded and curious music lovers around the world, and their newest recording is the most varied and driving to date. Nine new duos, trios and quartets swirling with melodic and rhythmic invention featuring the searing guitar of Marc Ribot, the magical vocals of Mike Patton and Zorn's manic sax with the astounding Dunn-Baron rhythm section. Ipsissimus is the fifth surprising installment in the remarkable Moonchild legacy.

== Reception ==
Paul Serralheiro of The Squid's Ear stated "The most striking aspect of John Zorn's recent music is the vein of mystic bipolarity it may be said to exhibit. Thus Ipsissimus navigates between heavy-metal demonic invocation and redemption music." Thom Jurek of AllMusic commented "This is an eclectic offering even by Moonchild's standards; one that feels far less focused and looser than anything else they've released. It bears many of Zorn's signature traits from the past without pointing a direct way forward. This is not a complaint, necessarily, but merely a new way to encounter the familiar."

== Track listing ==
1. Seven Sigils
2. The Book of Los
3. Apparitions I
4. Supplicant
5. Tabula Smaragdina
6. Apparitions II
7. The Changeling
8. Warlock
9. Apparitions III

== Personnel ==
- John Zorn – alto sax, piano, composer
- Joey Baron – drums
- Trevor Dunn – bass
- Mike Patton – voice
- Marc Ribot – guitar
