= Corpse flower =

Corpse flower can refer to:

- Carrion flowers or stinking flowers, any flower that emits an odor that smells like rotting flesh
  - Amorphophallus titanum, species, also known as the Titan arum, which has the largest unbranched inflorescence in the world
  - Rafflesia, plant genus containing the species Rafflesia arnoldii, the largest single flower on Earth
- Corpse Flower (album), collaboration album by Mike Patton and Jean-Claude Vannier
- Lycoris radiata, also known as Red Spider Lillies, are sometimes referred to as corpse flowers.
