= The Crucible (John Zorn album) =

Studio album by John Zorn
- Released: November 25, 2008
- Length: 44:22
- Label: Tzadik TZ 7372
- Producer: John Zorn

John Zorn chronology
Filmworks XXII: The Last Supper (2008)	The Crucible (2008)	Filmworks XXIII: El General (2008)

Moonchild chronology
Six Litanies for Heliogabalus (2007)	The Crucible (2008)	Ipsissimus (2010)

The Crucible is an album by John Zorn. It is the fourth album to feature the "Moonchild Trio" of Mike Patton, Joey Baron and Trevor Dunn, following Moonchild: Songs Without Words (2005), Astronome (2006) and Six Litanies for Heliogabalus (2007). It also features Marc Ribot on guitar and Zorn on alto saxophone.

== Reception ==
Professional ratings
Review scores
Source	Rating
Allmusic	4/5 stars
Consequence of Sound	5/5 stars

Allmusic called it "a mad mélange of modern classical music, doom-laden metal, power chord-driven rock, and freely improvised jazz." All About Jazz reviewer Mark Corroto noted "The exchanges are crisp and the musicianship (no surprise here) is top rate. The band displays a gentle beauty in the excess that is this music." Consequence of Sound stated "No matter how far Zorn experiments out into the ether, he always keeps grounded in the same place. And that place is always breathtaking, full of weird wonderment, amazing power and lithe musicianship."

== Track listing ==
All compositions by John Zorn

1. "Almadel" – 7:10
2. "Shapeshifting" – 3:19
3. "Maleficia" – 8:13
4. "9x9" – 5:37
5. "Hobgoblin" – 2:54
6. "Incubi" – 7:44
7. "Witchfinder" – 3:44
8. "The Initiate" – 5:41

== Personnel ==
- Mike Patton – voice
- John Zorn – alto saxophone
- Trevor Dunn – bass
- Joey Baron – drums
- Marc Ribot – guitar (track 4)
