= King Papaya =

Studio album by Koby Israelite
- Released: November 15, 2009
- Recorded: 2007
- Genre: Avant-garde, electronic, world, country, klezmer, jazz, rock
- Length: 48:00
- Label: Circus Mayhem Records
- Producer: Koby Israelite

Koby Israelite chronology
Is He Listening? (2009)	King Papaya (2009)

Professional ratings
Review scores
Source	Rating
Fly Global Music	(favourable)

King Papaya is the fifth album by Koby Israelite, recorded and mixed in Bamba Studios, London (2007) and released independently through Circus Mayhem Records. The album comes with a 28-page story by Ofir Touche Gafla. The album is dedicated to Koby's friend Ophir Star who died shortly after mixing the album.

== Track listing ==
1. Overture - 2:43
2. The King's Laughter - 4:37
3. Peardition Girls - 4:23
4. Word Travels Fast - 2:26
5. The Moroser - 4:08
6. Still Laughing - 0:27
7. Circus Mayhem - 4:28
8. Bald Patch - 2:42
9. A Band of Gypsies - 4:16
10. Hell's Kitchen - 1:26
11. Arrival of the Telepather - 2:15
12. Into the Subconscious - 1:43
13. Meeting an Angel - 3:58
14. Jacky Jones - 1:24
15. Last Laugh - 0:53
16. Molly's Sacrifice - 4:07
17. The Saddest Joke Ever - 5:24

== Personnel ==
- Koby Israelite: Drums, Percussion, Accordion, Keyboards, Guitar, Bouzouki, Indian Banjo, Vocals, Flute, Electric Bass, Cajon, Arrangements and Producer
- Yaron Stavi: Bass
- Sebastian Merrick: Executive Producer
- Yoad Nevo: Mastering
- Ophir Star: Mixing
