= Sanatorium Under the Sign of the Hourglass (album) =

Studio album by Cracow Klezmer Band
- Released: 21 June 2005
- Genre: Avant-garde, contemporary classical music, jazz, kletzmer
- Length: 65:36
- Label: Tzadik
- Producer: John Zorn

Cracow Klezmer Band chronology
Bereshit (2003)	Sanatorium Under the Sign of the Hourglass (2005)	Balan: Book of Angels Volume 5 (2006)

Sanatorium Under the Sign of the Hourglass is an album by the Cracow Klezmer Band performing compositions written by John Zorn in tribute to the Polish writer Bruno Schultz.

== Track listing ==
1. "Meshakh" – 4:55
2. "Galgalim" – 5:14
3. "Tirzah" – 10:40
4. "Yesod" – 4:45
5. "Pagiel" – 7:34
6. "Adithaim" – 6:45
7. "Hamadah" – 6:17
8. "Regalim" – 4:45
9. "Demai" – 9:08
10. "Meholalot" – 5:39

All compositions by John Zorn.

== Personnel ==
- Jaroslaw Bester – bayan
- Oleg Dyyak – bayan, clarinet, percussion
- Wojciech Front – double bass
- Jaroslaw Tyrala – violin
- Grazyna Auguscik – vocals
