= Filmworks XXIII: El General =

Soundtrack album by John Zorn
- Released: February 2008
- Recorded: October 2007
- Genre: avant-garde, jazz, classical
- Length: 49:35
- Label: Tzadik TZ 7373
- Producer: John Zorn

John Zorn chronology
The Crucible (2009)	Filmworks XXIII: El General (2008)	Alhambra Love Songs (2009)

Filmworks chronology
Filmworks XXII: The Last Supper (2008)	Filmworks XXIII: El General (2008)	Filmworks XXIV: The Nobel Prizewinner (2010)

Filmworks XXIII: El General is a film score by American composer John Zorn for Natalia Almada's documentary El General which depicts Mexican politician Plutarco Elías Calles. It is the twenty-third album of Zorn's Filmworks series.

== Reception ==
Professional ratings
Review scores
Source	Rating
Allmusic	4.5/5 stars
Free Jazz Collective	3.5/5 stars

The Allmusic review by Anthony Tognazzini stated "Working with instrumentation that includes accordion, bass, marimba, and guitar, the score folds traditional Mexican folk into an avant-chamber context, creating an evocative soundtrack that is atmospheric and, in keeping with Zorn’s aesthetic, thoroughly creative". All About Jazz reviewer Warren Allen noted "Within these cues, Zorn's distinct and wonderful touch is at work, pulling the different sounds, feelings, colors, etc... into something that exists unto itself, without needing a genre or a film to give it clarity, perspective, and meaning". The Free Jazz Collective stated "It's always a pleasure to hear these four musicians play, and regardless of the subgenre, they usually have something new to bring as they do here. Nice, but not essential".

== Track listing ==
All compositions by John Zorn

No.	Title	Length
1.	"Los Cristeros"	4:26
2.	"El General"	4:56
3.	"Besos De Sangre"	7:25
4.	"Maximato"	2:51
5.	"Soviet Mexico"	3:42
6.	"Lagrimas Para Ti"	2:58
7.	"Mala Suerte"	5:44
8.	"Exilio"	3:21
9.	"Recuerdos"	2:58
10.	"Besos De Sangre (Piano Trio)"	5:45
11.	"Exactamente Eso"	5:29

== Personnel ==
- Rob Burger − piano, accordion
- Greg Cohen − double bass
- Marc Ribot − electric guitar, acoustic guitar
- Kenny Wollesen − drums, vibraphone, bass marimba
