= Filmworks XXIV: The Nobel Prizewinner =

Soundtrack album by John Zorn
- Released: August 24, 2010
- Recorded: March–April 2010
- Genre: avant-garde, jazz, classical
- Length: 58:16
- Label: Tzadik TZ 7385
- Producer: John Zorn

John Zorn chronology
Haborym: Book of Angels Volume 16 (2010)	Filmworks XXIV: The Nobel Prizewinner (2010)	Ipsissimus (2010)

Filmworks chronology
Filmworks XXIII: El General (2010)	Filmworks XXIV: The Nobel Prizewinner (2010)	Filmworks XXV: City of Slaughter/Schmatta/Beyond the Infinite (2013)

Filmworks XXIV: The Nobel Prizewinner is a soundtrack album by American composer John Zorn released on Zorn's own label, Tzadik, in 2010 featuring music written and recorded for Dutch film director Timo Veltkamp's's De Nobelprijswinnaar (2010).

== Reception ==
Professional ratings
Review scores
Source	Rating
Allmusic	4/5 stars

The Allmusic review by Thom Jurek awarded the album 4 stars stating "Perhaps the highest compliment to pay a recording like this is not only to claim that it stands on its own as a piece of music -- because, as in all of Zorn's scores, it does -- but moreover that it is so utterly, cleverly and aesthetically engaging, it creates in the listener the desire to see the film and experience how this music functions within it".

== Track listing ==
All compositions by John Zorn

1. "The Nobel Prize Winner" - 4:15
2. "Writer's Block (Ilse's Theme)" - 4:17
3. "The Depraved City" - 5:09
4. "Annabel" - 3:31
5. "Our In-House Dostoevsky" - 4:37
6. "The Search" - 1:56
7. "Dénouement" - 3:24
8. "Door to Door" - 5:04
9. "Suicidal Tendency" - 1:56
10. "Fyodor and Annabel" - 5:10
11. "Plagiarism" - 2:52
12. "Moral and Immoral (take 1)" - 3:08
13. "Ghost of a Guilty Conscience" - 4:40
14. "Joachim West" - 5:02
15. "Moral and Immoral (take 2)" - 3:06

== Personnel ==
- Rob Burger - piano
- Trevor Dunn - bass
- Kenny Wollesen - drums, vibraphone
