= Filmworks XXI: Belle de Nature/The New Rijksmuseum =

Soundtrack album by John Zorn
- Released: October 28, 2008
- Recorded: 2008
- Genre: avant-garde, jazz, classical
- Length: 60:21
- Label: Tzadik TZ 7370
- Producer: John Zorn

John Zorn chronology
Filmworks XX: Sholem Aleichem (2008)	Filmworks XXI: Belle de Nature/The New Rijksmuseum (2008)	Filmworks XXII: The Last Supper (2008)

Filmworks chronology
Filmworks XX: Sholem Aleichem (2008)	Filmworks XXI: Belle de Nature/The New Rijksmuseum (2008)	Filmworks XXII: The Last Supper (2008)

Filmworks XXI: Belle de Nature/Rijksmuseum features a score for film by John Zorn. The album was released on Zorn's own label, Tzadik Records, in 2008 and contains music that Zorn wrote and recorded for film director Maria Beatty's Belle de Nature (2008) and a documentary on the renovation of the Rijksmuseum Amsterdam.

== Reception ==
Professional ratings
Review scores
Source	Rating
Allmusic	4/5 stars

The Allmusic review by Thom Jurek awarded the album 4 stars stating "first seven cues as riveting as they are beautiful. The sheer exotic nature of these strings all played together in woven layers of counterpoint and rhythmic and melodic invention creates a soundscape that sounds much more lush than it actually is. While each cue is a truly expansive small journey in its own right, when taken together they have the capacity to transport the listener to another place" and the Rijksmuseum pieces as "wonderfully strange... the fabric created by specially made glass percussion instruments by Baptista and Wollesen's vibes takes the music into completely different realms".

== Track listing ==
All compositions by John Zorn

1. "Masque en Sole" - 5:09
2. "Un Rose" - 2:05
3. "L 'Air et les Songes" - 2:39
4. "Fouet d'Épines" - 5:08
5. "Elle Vient" - 3:52
6. "Orties Cuisantes" - 4:31
7. "Belle de Nature" - 4:52
8. "Storage" - 2:08
9. "Conservation" - 3:57
10. "Rendering" - 4:20
11. "Meeting" - 3:02
12. "Restoration" - 1:35
13. "Construction" - 3:17
14. "Architecture" - 4:19
15. "Design" - 1:55
16. "Planning" - 3:06
17. "Completion" - 4:17

== Personnel ==
- Marc Ribot - guitar, electric guitar (tracks 1–7)
- Carol Emanuel - harp (tracks 1–7)
- Shanir Ezra Blumenkranz - bass (tracks 1–7)
- Cyro Baptista - percussion (tracks 8–17)
- Uri Caine - harpsichord, piano (tracks 8–17)
- Kenny Wollesen - vibraphone, chimes, percussion (tracks 8–17)
- John Zorn - harpsichord, glass percussion (tracks 8–17)
