= Is He Listening? =

Studio album by Koby Israelite
- Released: March 3, 2009
- Genre: Avant-garde, folk, world, country, jazz, rock
- Length: 51:01
- Label: Tzadik
- Producer: Koby Israelite

Koby Israelite chronology
Orobas: Book of Angels Volume 4 (2006)	Is He Listening? (2009)	King Papaya (2009)

Professional ratings
Review scores
Source	Rating
Squidsear	(favorable)

Is He Listening? is the fourth album by Koby Israelite, the last under the Tzadik label. It was recorded and mixed at Bamba Studios in London in 2008.

== Track listing ==
1. Joy - 5:48
2. Papa Don´t Trill - 5:30
3. Easy Listening - 5:34
4. Out to Lounge - 5:31
5. Shmekeria - 4:31
6. Adon Haselichot - 3:42
7. Almost There but Not Quite - 3:00
8. Under the Apricot Tree - 4:48
9. Self Hating Blues - 2:53
10. Two Stone Down - 2:15
11. Paulina In the Skype - 3:54
12. Just Like Everybody Else - 6:15

== Personnel ==
- Koby Israelite

Accordion, Drums, Percussion, Cajón, Guitar, Piano, Keyboards, Mandolin, Bouzouki, Clarinet, Flute, Saxophone Soprano, Bass, Vocals

- Yaron Stavi
  Bass, Vocals
- Tigran Aleksanyan
  Duduk, Clarinet (tracks 2, 3, 8, 10)
- Michael Israelite
  Bass, Dumbek, Vocals (tracks 3, 6)
- Marius Manole
  Accordion (tracks 5, 12)
- Ofir Gal
  Guitar (tracks 1, 11)
- Joe Taylor
  Oud (track 6)
- Mor Karbasi
  Vocals (track 6)
- John Telfer
  Baritone Saxophone (track 10)
- Roy Shabat
  Trumpet (track 11)
- Koby Israelite
  Composition, Production, recording, Mix
- John Zorn
  Executive Producer
- Scott Hull
  Mastering (2)
