= The Cracow Klezmer Band =

Polish jazz quartet

Cracow Klezmer Band (The Bester Quartet)
- Music ensemble
- Founded: 1997
- Location: Kraków, Tzadik Records, US
- Website: www.ckb.cracow.pl

The Cracow Klezmer Band was a Polish klezmer quartet formed by accordionist and composer Jarosław Bester in 1997 in the city of Kraków, and recorded for Tzadik Records. The group performed at Jewish Culture festivals in Hungary, Finland, Poland, Prague, and the Czech Republic. Its sound was different from what most people would consider to be traditional klezmer music — instead of danceable versions of traditional Yiddish songs, and free-form fantasies, and laments, The Cracow Klezmer Band played often dark and brooding but soulful and dynamic original virtuoso compositions instead in the klezmer form. Some songs could be considered dance pieces, but there were none of the traditional Bulgars, Freylekhs or Horas.

They also imitated non-musical sounds using their instruments, for example the sound of a creaking ship or a distant crying bird; this actually has a long tradition in klezmer music.

In January 2007, the band changed its name to the Bester Quartet, with the same line-up.

== Members ==
The Cracow Klezmer Band consisted of four members:

- Jarosław Bester – accordion
- Jarosław Tyrala – violin
- Oleg Dyyak – accordion, clarinet and percussion
- Wojciech Front – double bass

== Discography ==
The Band released albums on John Zorn's Tzadik record label, with its mandate of "Radical Jewish Culture."

=== The Cracow Klezmer Band ===
- De Profundis (2000)
- The Warriors (2001)
- Voices in the Wilderness (2003) - Crakow Klezmer Band perform one track
- Bereshit (2003)
- Sanatorium Under the Sign of the Hourglass (2005)
- Balan: Book of Angels Volume 5 (2006)
- Remembrance (2007)

=== Bester Quartet ===
- Metamorphoses (2012)
- The Golden Land (2013)
- Krakoff (2013)

== See also ==
- Culture of Kraków
