= Mood Swings (Koby Israelite album) =

Studio album by Koby Israelite
- Released: May 2005
- Genre: Avant-garde, electronic, world, country, klezmer, jazz, rock
- Length: 51:55
- Label: Tzadik
- Producer: Koby Israelite

Koby Israelite chronology
Dance of the Idiots (2003)	Mood Swings (2005)	Orobas: Book of Angels Volume 4 (2006)

Professional ratings
Review scores
Source	Rating
Rainlore's World of Music	(favorable)
Allmusic Rating -	3.5/5 stars

Mood Swings is an album by Koby Israelite released in 2005 on Tzadik.

== Track listing ==
1. "Dror Ikra" - 3:03
2. "Return of the Idiots" - 2:19
3. "It Is Not a War Here" - 7:05
4. "Ethnometalogy" - 5:08
5. "Europa?" - 2:49
6. "Hiriya On My Mind" - 4:53
7. "12 Bar (Mitzvah) Blues" - 4:34
8. "For Emily" - 6:23
9. "No Room for Anarchy" - 3:26
10. "Goodbye Unit 26" - 3:32
11. "Mood Swings / Smile" - 5:12
12. "Psychosemitic" - 4:32

== Personnel ==
- Banjo - Koby Israelite (tracks: 1, 2, 4, 9, 10)
- Bass - Yaron Stavi (tracks: 1, 3, 4, 5, 7, 8, 10 to 12)
- Clarinet - Gilad Atzmon (tracks: 4, 6, 7, 10, 11), Koby Israelite (tracks: 1 to 3, 5, 7 to 9), Tigran Aleksanyan (tracks: 4)
- Guitar - Koby Israelite (tracks: 1, 3 to 9, 12)
- Keyboards - Koby Israelite (tracks: 3, 4, 6 to 9, 11, 12)
- Mastered by - Scott Hull (2)
- Mixed by - Bill Laswell (tracks: 10 to 12), Koby Israelite (tracks: 1 to 9), Ophir Star (tracks: 1, 2, 4, 6, 7)
- Producer, Composed By, Arranged By, Recorded By, Accordion, Drums, Percussion - Koby Israelite
- Recorder [Duduk] - Tigran Aleksanyan (tracks: 1, 3, 8)
- Saxophone - Gilad Atzmon (tracks: 7, 8, 11)
- Tuba - Oren Marshall (tracks: 2, 7)
- Viola - David Lasserson (tracks: 1, 9, 10)
- Violin - Marcel Mamaliga (tracks: 3, 12)
- Vocals - Koby Israelite (tracks: 1, 5, 8, 12)
