= Moloch: Book of Angels Volume 6 =

Studio album by Uri Caine
- Released: November 21, 2006
- Recorded: September 6, 2006
- Genres: Avant-garde, contemporary classical music, jazz, klezmer
- Length: 72:18
- Label: Tzadik
- Producer: John Zorn

Book of Angels chronology
Balan: Book of Angels Volume 5 (2006)	Moloch: Book of Angels Volume 6 (2006)	Asmodeus: Book of Angels Volume 7 (2007)

John Zorn chronology
Astronome (2006)	Moloch: Book of Angels Volume 6 (2006)	Six Litanies for Heliogabalus (2007)

Moloch: Book of Angels Volume 6 is an album by Uri Caine performing compositions from John Zorn's second Masada book, "The Book of Angels".

== Reception ==
The Allmusic review by Thom Jurek awarded the album 4 stars

Professional ratings
Review scores
Source	Rating
Allmusic	4/5 stars
The Penguin Guide to Jazz	3/4 stars

== Track listing ==
All compositions by John Zorn.

1. Rimmon – 4:45
2. Domiel – 3:56 – misspelled as "Lomiel" on album sleeve
3. Mehriel – 4:32 – misspelled as "Kebriel" on album sleeve
4. Savliel – 2:25
5. Tufrial – 4:04
6. Jerazol – 3:41
7. Harshiel – 3:34
8. Dumah – 3:14 – misspelled as "Lumah" on album sleeve
9. Harviel – 5:01
10. Segef – 1:59
11. Sahriel – 4:59
12. Shokad – 2:56
13. Zophiel – 5:01
14. Hayyoth – 2:31
15. Nuriel – 5:51
16. Ubaviel – 5:17
17. Hadrial – 4:41
18. Cassiel – 2:37
19. Rimmon – 6:14

- Recorded at Avatar Studios in New York City on September 6, 2006

== Personnel ==
- Uri Caine – piano
