= Filmworks XX: Sholem Aleichem =

Soundtrack album by John Zorn
- Released: September 16, 2008
- Recorded: 2008
- Genre: avant-garde, jazz, classical
- Length: 44:32
- Label: Tzadik TZ 7369
- Producer: John Zorn

John Zorn chronology
The Art of Memory II (2008)	Filmworks XX: Sholem Aleichem (2008)	Filmworks XXI: Belle de Nature/The New Rijksmuseum (2008)

Filmworks chronology
Filmworks XIX: The Rain Horse (2008)	Filmworks XX: Sholem Aleichem (2008)	Filmworks XXI: Belle de Nature/The New Rijksmuseum (2008)

Filmworks XX: Sholem Aleichem features a score for film by John Zorn. The album was released on Zorn's own label, Tzadik Records, in 2008 and contains music that Zorn wrote and recorded for a documentary on the 19th century Jewish writer Sholem Aleichem.

== Reception ==
Professional ratings
Review scores
Source	Rating
Allmusic	4/5 stars

The Allmusic review by Thom Jurek awarded the album 4 stars stating "Musically, this project, for being centered on the folk themes from Eastern European Jewry, dating as early as the 18th century, is also wonderfully modern and diverse... The music here is accessible, evocative, and yes, as is almost always the case for Zorn, thoroughly engaging".

== Track listing ==
All compositions by John Zorn

1. "Shalom, Sholem!" - 2:11
2. "Luminous Visions" - 4:12
3. "Mamme Loshen" - 3:18
4. "Beyond the Pale" - 2:25
5. "Mekubolim" - 4:36
6. "Portable Homeland" - 4:06
7. "Wandering Star" - 3:19
8. "Jewish Revolutionaries" - 4:59
9. "Shtetls" - 3:02
10. "Lucky Me, I'm an Orphan!" - 3:47
11. "Nicht Gefährlich" - 3:42
12. "Talking Through Oblivion" - 4:46

== Personnel ==
- Mark Feldman - violin
- Carol Emanuel - harp
- Rob Burger - accordion
- Erik Friedlander - cello
- Greg Cohen - bass
