= Filmworks XIX: The Rain Horse =

Soundtrack album by John Zorn
- Released: January 22, 2008
- Recorded: 2007
- Genre: avant-garde, jazz, classical
- Length: 40:42
- Label: Tzadik
- Producer: John Zorn

Filmworks chronology
Filmworks XVIII: The Treatment (2006)	Filmworks XIX: The Rain Horse (2008)	Filmworks XX: Sholem Aleichem (2008)

John Zorn chronology
Volac: Book of Angels Volume 8 (2007)	Filmworks XIX: The Rain Horse (2008)	The Dreamers (2008)

Filmworks XIX: The Rain Horse features a score for film by John Zorn. The album was released on Zorn's own label, Tzadik Records, in 2008 and contains music that Zorn wrote and recorded for the animated short film The Rain Horse (2008), directed by Russian animator Dmitry Geller.

== Reception ==
The Allmusic review by Thom Jurek awarded the album 4½ stars, stating: "One could cite every track here as extraordinary in some way, but taken as a whole, this soundtrack throws down the gauntlet to almost anyone composing film music – especially for a chamber ensemble – today. Morricone is still the king, but one can envision him applauding the elegance, taste, and slow-burning fire in this score".

Professional ratings
Review scores
Source	Rating
Allmusic	4.5/5 stars

== Track listing ==
All compositions by John Zorn

1. "Tears of Morning" – 4:32
2. "The Stallion" – 2:42
3. "Tree of Life" – 3:01
4. "Wedding of Wild Horses" – 4:21
5. "Forests in the Mist" – 6:09
6. "Dance Exotique" – 2:59
7. "Bird in the Mist" – 4:01
8. "Parable of Job" – 4:17
9. "Encounter" – 2:10
10. "The Rain Horse" – 4:16
11. "End Credits" – 2:04

== Personnel ==
- Greg Cohen – bass
- Rob Burger – piano
- Erik Friedlander – cello
