= Mondo Cane (album) =

Studio album by Mike Patton
- Released: May 4, 2010
- Genres: Italian popular music, Baroque pop, easy listening, world Music
- Length: 36:49
- Labels: Ipecac Recordings (IPC-119) (CD)
- Producers: Mike Patton, Daniele Luppi

Mike Patton chronology
Crank: High Voltage soundtrack (2009)	Mondo Cane (2010)	The Solitude of Prime Numbers (soundtrack) (2011)

Mondo Cane is a 2010 album by Mike Patton. Featuring a forty-member orchestra and fifteen-piece backing band, the album contains a series of cover versions of 1950s and 1960s Italian pop music. Patton conceived of the album while living in Bologna, and became attracted to music he heard on the radio featuring pop singers backed by orchestras.

Released on May 4, 2010, through Patton's record label Ipecac Recordings, Mondo Cane has been met with favorable responses from music critics. Reviewers have drawn comparisons to California, an earlier album by Patton's first group Mr. Bungle. Mondo Cane peaked at number 2 in the United States' Classical Albums chart, briefly charting in Switzerland and Finland as well.

== Production ==
=== Gestation ===
Mondo Cane consists of Mike Patton's arrangements and performances of 1950s and 1960s Italian pop songs. Patton had heard these songs while living in Bologna. He had adopted the city as a second home after marrying Italian artist Titi Zuccatosta, and had become a fluent speaker of Italian. Patton began exploring Italian popular music; although initially wishing to listen to contemporary music, he found nothing that interested him. However, he became drawn to pop music from the 1950s and 1960s, intrigued by singers using orchestras for backing rather than pop bands. Having considered making an album covering these songs for some time, Patton initially believed he would approach the project with a small band, but was offered the chance to compose music for an orchestra. Patton then opted to use this opportunity to record Mondo Cane instead.

Patton had also been inspired by the music of Italian composer Ennio Morricone. Patton's record label Ipecac Recordings had previously released Crime and Dissonance, a two-disc retrospective of Morricone's work. The singer has described his admiration for Morricone's writing, feeling that the composer turned "what could be banal, surface-style pop into really deep, orchestrated, tense and compelling music". Several of the album's songs had been written by Morricone, including "Deep Down", written for the 1968 Mario Bava film Danger: Diabolik. Patton had been aware of the song for some time, having been a fan of the film and Morricone's score; however, the two musicians never actually met or worked together.

=== Recording ===
Mondo Cane was recorded with the backing of a forty-strong orchestra, a fifteen-piece band, and a choir. Recordings were made on a live tour, with the album's tracks assembled as composites from the first three dates of the Italian leg of the tour. Each song contains elements taken from different recordings, with Patton describing the process as "a giant Rubiks Cube [sic]", noting that individual bars of one instrument's music might be lifted from one concert and layered with bars of another instrument's parts from another concert.

Stylistically, the album has been described by Allrovi's Jason Lymangrover as ranging "from Frank Sinatra pop to psychedelic garage rock"; while The Boston Globe's James Reed has noted the "spare" sound of "Scalinatella" and the "furious and rocking" pace of "Urlo Negro". Although wanting to remain faithful to the original versions of the songs covered, Patton wished to avoid simply mimicking the original recordings, stating "this is a record of covers, and I believe firmly that you have to make them your own. There is a very fine line to tread. You have to treat a song with respect, yet twist it up, fuck it up and somehow make it a part of your own voice". When assembling the cut for "Deep Down", Patton was able to get in touch with the original vocalist, a woman named Christy, though mutual friend Daniele Luppi. However, she declined to take part in the project.

One song on the record, "Scalinatella", is sung in Neapolitan, rather than Italian, which required Patton to re-learn the correct inflections and pronunciations in that language. However, the conductor of the orchestra Patton used on tour was a native of Naples and would frequently correct the singer during rehearsal until he was able to perform it correctly. Describing this collaboration, Patton noted "I had a lot of great people around me. I wouldn’t have been able to do any of this shit without them".

== Track listing ==
No.	Title	Writer(s)	Length
1.	"Il cielo in una stanza"	Gino Paoli	3:55
2.	"Che notte!"	Fred Buscaglione, Leo Chiosso	3:18
3.	"Ore d'amore"	Bert Kaempfert, Carl Sigman, Franco Migliacci, Herbert Rehbein	2:52
4.	"Deep Down"	Ennio Morricone, Audrey Nohra Stainton	3:21
5.	"Quello che conta"	Ennio Morricone, Luciano Salce	4:03
6.	"Urlo Negro"	Angelo Galletti Leo Ceroni	2:49
7.	"Scalinatella"	Enzo Bonagura, Giuseppe Cioffi	3:15
8.	"L'uomo che non sapeva amare"	Elmer Bernstein, Mogol, Vito Pallavicini	3:17
9.	"20 km al giorno"	Mogol, Pino Massara	2:55
10.	"Ti offro da bere"	Gianni Meccia	2:27
11.	"Senza fine"	Gino Paoli	4:37
Total length:			36:49

== Release and reception ==
Professional ratings
Aggregate scores
Source	Rating
Metacritic	74/100
Review scores
Source	Rating
AllMusic	4/5 stars
The A.V. Club	B+
Drowned in Sound	7/10 stars
PopMatters	7/10 stars
Slant Magazine	3/5 stars
Sputnikmusic	3.5/5 stars

Although initially intended for release in 2009, Mondo Cane was released on May 4, 2010 through Patton's record label, Ipecac Recordings. The album was released on both compact disc and vinyl record. The album's cover features a die-cut design based on poster artwork created to advertise one of the early Mondo Cane concerts.

Mondo Cane has been met with generally favorable reviews. Review aggregation website Metacritic lists the album as having an average rating of 74 out of 100, based on seventeen reviews. Writing for Allrovi, Jason Lymangrover rated the album four stars out of five, calling it Patton's "most elaborate endeavor to date". Lymangrover singled out "Deep Down" as a highlight, and felt that the covers were treated with due deference to the original recordings while still featuring Patton's idiosyncratic take on them. Philip Bloomfield of Drowned in Sound awarded Mondo Cane a score of seven out of ten, describing it as "yet more proof that his talent and his breadth are perhaps indeed 'senza fine'". Bloomfield compared the sound of the album to California, a 1999 release by Patton's first band Mr. Bungle; and also felt that although the album's covers were faithful to the original versions, they still showcased a degree of Patton's versatility. Slant Magazine's Jesse Cataldo rated Mondo Cane three stars out of five, describing Patton as "less a musician than a kind of gonzo multi-specialty clearinghouse". Cataldo felt that album was "actually simpler and less interesting than it sounds", finding it to be well-made but slightly incohesive.

Chris Martins of The A.V. Club awarded the album a B+ rating, feeling that it "offers a new window into the obfuscated Patton oeuvre". Martins also compared the record to California and felt that it would be greatly enjoyed by fans of Patton's various side projects. Writing for The Boston Globe, James Reed described Mondo Cane as "offbeat for sure but not off-putting", adding that "language is no barrier with music this lovely". Sputnikmusic's Tyler Monro rated the album three-and-a-half out of five, feeling that it would be, in theory, a bad idea. However, Monro felt that, on listening to the album, it was "his best work in close to a decade", describing it as "a summer-time staple and a faithful reminder that Mike Patton can sing but sadly little else". Writing for PopMatters, John Garratt rated the album seven out of ten, writing "even if this album is a genre exercise, it’s still a very fine one". Garrat felt that "Deep Down" was the album's best song, adding that it "feels like it was written just for Mike Patton to sing".

== Chart performance ==
In the United States, Mondo Cane reached a peak position of #2 on the Billboard Classical Albums chart, spending forty-two weeks in the chart in total. The album also spent one week in the Independent Albums chart, at #41, and two weeks in the Top Heatseekers album chart, peaking at #7. Mondo Cane spent one week in the Swiss Music Charts, at #81, and one week in The Official Finnish Charts, at #44.

Country	Chart	Peak position	Ref
Finland	The Official Finnish Charts	44	
Switzerland	Swiss Music Charts	81	
United States	Classical Albums	2	
United States	Independent Albums	41	
United States	Top Heatseekers	7	
