= Koby Israelite =

Israeli musical artist

Koby Israelite קובי ישראלי
- Born: November 23, 1966 (age 59); Tel Aviv
- Genres: Gypsy, punk rock, jazz, middle-eastern, balkan, metal, drum and bass, klezmer
- Instruments: Accordion, percussion, piano, drums, guitar, bass, clarinet, saxophone, flute, bouzouki, mandolin

Koby Israelite (Hebrew: קובי ישראלי) is a multi-instrumentalist composer, producer, songwriter and band leader. He released four albums through John Zorn's Tzadik Records label: Dance of the Idiots (2003), Mood Swings (2005), Orobas: Book of Angels Volume 4 (2006), and Is He Listening? (2009). King Papaya was independently released in 2009 to positive reviews.

As well as producing solo material, Israelite has established a career producing for a range of artists, touring stages around the world and co-operating with a number of film, theatre and television companies.

== Biography ==
=== Early life ===
At the age of six, Koby Israelite started taking classical piano lessons at the Tel Aviv conservatory of music. At the age of 15, he started to play the drum kit and studied jazz at the David Rich School of Drumming in Tel Aviv. Self-taught on his brother’s left handed right handed guitar, he joined several rock, punk and heavy metal bands.

Whilst living and studying in Israel he became exposed to a range of different styles and genres from a variety of locations around the world, which has rounded his style.

After finishing studies in Israel he turned down the chance to study at Berklee College of Music and instead moved to London to further his career.

=== Early career ===
After moving to London a number of new opportunities arose in Koby's career. He joined a rock group and also became a professional session drummer, mastering numerous musical styles from jazz to metal to drum and bass to West African funk.

After his band failed to agree on the terms of a proposed record contract he decided to part ways and become more independent as an artist, which led to the start of composition and recording of his own solo material.

After seeing the Romanian Gypsy outfit Taraf de Haïdouks play live in London, Koby became immediately endeared to the accordion. The acquisition of an accordion was a milestone in Koby's musical direction.

Israelite began gigging and recording with a number of Taraf De Haidouks members as well as having his music covered by Fanfare Ciocărlia.

After building Bamba Studios at his home in London, Israelite began producing, writing and arranging for himself and others.

Koby sent a demo recording to idol and major influence John Zorn, which was another milestone in Koby Israelite's career.

=== Signing to Tzadik ===
Koby Israelite was offered a recording contract with New York Label Tzadik Records in April 2003, owned by John Zorn himself. He released four albums through the established Tzadik Records imprint, Dance of the Idiots (2003), Mood Swings (2005) Orobas: Book of Angels Volume 4 (2006) and Is He Listening? (2009).

Koby Israelite also contributed to a number of albums written by John Zorn under the Masada Book 2: The Book of Angels series.

=== Becoming an independent artist ===
After success through the Tzadik label, Koby managed to establish himself as an independent artist. He independently released King Papaya. He is continuing the recording and production of his own solo work as well as studio and touring projects with a range of other artists and musicians.

=== Music for movies, television and radio ===
Koby's music has appeared on the BBC and Channel 4.

He produced an original score for Israeli Academy Award winning TV programme “The Ten Commandments”.

He was selected to appear in Madonna’s directorial debut film Filth and Wisdom.

He has written an original score for the film Jerusalem Syndrome.

== Discography ==
- 1999 - Tequila Girls
- 2001 - I Think Therefore I'm Not Sure
- 2003 - Dance of the Idiots
- 2005 - Mood Swings
- 2006 - Orobas: Book of Angels Volume 4
- 2009 - King Papaya
- 2009 - Is He Listening?
- 2013 - Blues From Elsewhere

== Appearances ==
- 2003 - Gilad Atzmon & the orient house ensemble / Enja records
- 2003 - Masada Anniversary Edition Vol. 3: The Unknown Masada
- 2006 - Artie Fishel and the promise band
- 2006 - Giulio Risi / Deep down where the heart beats no more.
- 2007 - Daphna Sadeh and the voyagers / Walking a thin line /33 records
- 2007 - international akkordeon festival. Wien Live, vol ... 2/extraplatte
- 2008 - Madonna debut film -- Filth and Wisdom. Soundtrack (one track: Saints & Dates)
- 2008 - Jerusalem syndrome. Scored original soundtrack.
- 2008 - Malcolm bruce, youth music.
