= Alhambra Love Songs =

Studio album by John Zorn
- Released: April 21, 2009
- Recorded: October 27, 2008
- Genre: Avant-Garde experimental music
- Length: 44:35
- Label: Tzadik TZ 7374
- Producer: John Zorn

John Zorn chronology
Filmworks XXIII: El General (2009)	Alhambra Love Songs (2009)	Stolas: Book of Angels Volume 12 (2009)

Alhambra Love Songs is an album composed by John Zorn which features eleven compositions performed by Rob Burger, Greg Cohen and Ben Perowsky. It includes musical tributes to Vince Guaraldi, Clint Eastwood, David Lynch, Mike Patton and Harry Smith.

== Reception ==
Professional ratings
Review scores
Source	Rating
Allmusic	4/5 stars
Record Collector	4/5 stars

The Allmusic review by Thom Jurek describes it as "an eclectic homage of sorts to the San Francisco Bay area and the musicians who have and continue to make it their home". The North Coast Journal stated "Alhambra Love Songs is yet another John Zorn record executed with grace, musical excellence, a sense of play and intensity. And, oddly, it just may be one of the great summer records of this year". Writing in Record Collector, reviewer Spencer Grady noted "This set captures a group in total togetherness, both with each other and also the wishes of their composer. In a decidedly vast and varied canon, Alhambra Love Songs may just prove to be one of John Zorn’s most rewarding and enduring works".

== Track listing ==
All compositions by John Zorn

1. "Mountain View" – 5:08
2. "Novato" – 3:52
3. "Pacifica" – 3:58
4. "Benicia" – 3:48
5. "Half Moon Bay" – 4:38
6. "Moraga" – 4:17
7. "Tamalpais" – 4:08
8. "Larkspur" – 3:36
9. "Alhambra Blues" – 4:26
10. "Miramar" – 1:19
11. "Tiburon" – 5:19

== Personnel ==
- Rob Burger: piano
- Greg Cohen: bass, electric bass
- Ben Perowsky: drums
