= Stolas: Book of Angels Volume 12 =

Studio album by Masada Quintet with Joe Lovano
- Released: June 2009
- Recorded: 22 February 2009
- Genre: Avant-garde, contemporary classical music
- Length: 62:59
- Label: Tzadik TZ 7375
- Producer: John Zorn and Kazunori Sugiyama

Book of Angels chronology
Zaebos: Book of Angels Volume 11 (2008)	Stolas: Book of Angels Volume 12 (2009)	Mycale: Book of Angels Volume 13 (2010)

John Zorn chronology
Alhambra Love Songs (2009)	Stolas: Book of Angels Volume 12 (2009)	O'o (2009)

Stolas: Book of Angels Volume 12 is an album by the Masada Quintet featuring Joe Lovano performing compositions from John Zorn's Masada Book Two. This is the first known recording by the Masada Quintet.

== Reception ==
Professional ratings
Review scores
Source	Rating
Allmusic	4/5 stars

The Allmusic review by Thom Jurek states: "Zorn has become a prolific composer of film scores and string quartets, and he writes for any number of other configurations as one of the most in-demand composers in the world. All of that is born out on Stolas, the single most beautiful album in the Book of Angels series so far – and, one might argue, in the entirety of the Masada catalog". On All About Jazz George Kanzler noted "this is a group with more than a passing resemblance to the classic '50s quintets of Miles Davis, Shorty Rogers, Horace Silver and Clifford Brown/Max Roach. Like those ensembles, the material is approached with a composer/arranger or leader's sensibility, each tune evoking and sustaining a particular mood, one often set by the tempo and rhythm, although seemingly dominated by improvised solos".

== Track listing ==
All compositions by John Zorn.

1. "Haamiah" – 4:20
2. "Rikbiel" – 5:48
3. "Psisya" – 8:26
4. "Sartael" – 4:51
5. "Tashriel" – 4:03
6. "Rahtiel" – 7:56
7. "Tagriel" – 13:30
8. "Serakel" – 5:09
9. "Rigal" – 8:59
- Recorded at Avatar Studios in New York City on 22 February 2009

== Personnel ==
- Dave Douglas – trumpet
- Joe Lovano – tenor saxophone
- Uri Caine – piano
- Greg Cohen – bass
- Joey Baron - drums
- John Zorn – alto saxophone (on track 6)
