= Filmworks XXII: The Last Supper =

Soundtrack album by John Zorn
- Released: November 2008
- Recorded: 2008
- Genre: exotica avant-garde psychedelic ambient retro
- Length: 46:38
- Label: Tzadik TZ 7371
- Producer: John Zorn

John Zorn chronology
Filmworks XXI: Belle de Nature/The New Rijksmuseum (2008)	Filmworks XXII: The Last Supper (2008)	The Crucible (2008)

Filmworks chronology
Filmworks XXI: Belle de Nature/The New Rijksmuseum (2008)	Filmworks XXII: The Last Supper (2008)	Filmworks XXIII: El General (2009)

Filmworks XXII: The Last Supper is a score by American composer John Zorn for Arno Bouchard's 2009 short science fiction/art film The Last Supper.

== Reception ==
Professional ratings
Review scores
Source	Rating
Allmusic	4.5/5 stars

Allmusic said "Using what are likely the very first instruments used by human beings--that is, voices and percussion--Zorn weaves a spell that evokes medieval music, ethnic ritual, and avant-garde explorations of pure sound".

== Track listing ==
All compositions by John Zorn

1. "Somnambulisme" - 2:12
2. "Opening Invocation" - 2:13
3. "Virgin Sacrifice" - 3:25
4. "Vespers" - 3:37
5. "Spiral" - 3:17
6. "The Last Supper" - 1:55
7. "The Colors of Blood" - 2:47
8. "Sexaltation" - 2:35
9. "Dance for the Vernal Equinox" - 1:35
10. "Tarot" - 1:43
11. "Time Travel" - 2:27
12. "Le Diable" - 2:01
13. "Exhaltation" - 2:01
14. "Futur Primitif" - 5:34
15. "Blood Ritual" - 2:39
16. "In Alium" - 6:29

All compositions by John Zorn

== Personnel ==
- Cyro Baptista: percussion
- Lisa Bielawa, Caleb Burhans, Martha Cluver, Abby Fischer, Kirsten Sollek: voices
- John Zorn: percussion
