= Dmitry Geller =

Russian animator and film director (born 1970)

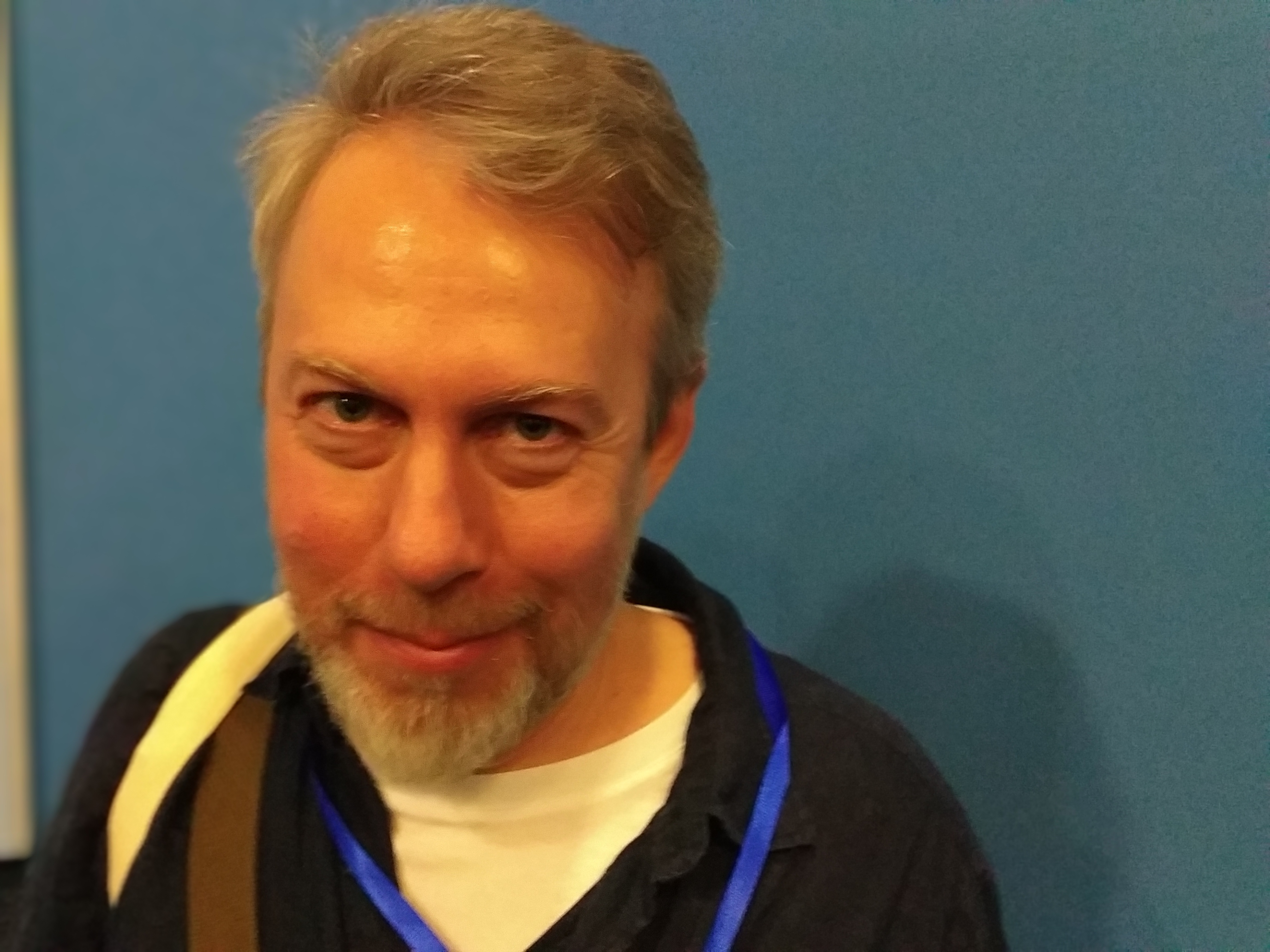
- Born: Dmitry Alexandrovich Geller; 12 October 1970 (age 55); Sverdlovsk, Soviet Union
- Occupations: Animator and director

Dmitry Alexandrovich Geller (Russian: Дмитрий Александрович Геллер; born 12 October 1970) is a Russian animator and film director.

== Biography ==
Geller began his creative activity as an independent artist, participating in art exhibitions in St. Petersburg, Copenhagen, Washington and Sofia. In his native city Yekaterinburg he participated in exhibitions in several civic centres. In 1985, together with a group of architects, he participated in creation of happenings at disco parties in a civic centre.

In the 1990s he began working as an artist at the studio "A-Film" at the Sverdlovsk Film Studio. He studied at the High Courses for Scriptwriters and Film Directors in Moscow (workshop of Fyodor Khitruk, Yuriy Norshteyn, Eduard Nazarov, and Andrei Khrzhanovsky), and graduated in the year 1997. In the same year, he made a one-minute film for the animation project Optimus Mundus.

Geller directed and animated sequences in feature and documentary films. He created graphic design for a series of documentaries about the small nations in Africa, Asia and the north of Russia, as well as opening night posters for movies.

Invited by Jilin Animation Institute in 2011–2020 he created together with students four animated films, one of which received the Chinese National Award for the best short film in 2012, and the Grand Prix of the Hiroshima Film Festival.

Films of Geller have participated in musical performances in France and the Netherlands as his film Filmworks XIX: The Rain Horse ("Boy") was shown in the jubilee presentations celebrating the 60th anniversary of John Zorn in Paris and on his jubilee concert in Mexico City.

Retrospectives of Geller’s films have taken part at film festivals in Moscow, St. Petersburg, Yekaterinburg, ANIMATOR (festival), Nikozi, Kraków, and Sofia, and selected films were shown in Amsterdam on the ship Azart ("The ship of fools"). Geller's films are shown in the collections of the Hiroshima Film Festival museum, Victoria and Albert Museum in London, and Cinematheque in New York.

== Filmography ==
- The Mistress of the Copper Mountain, 2020
- Fishes swimmers boats, 2017
- Man meets woman, 2014
- The little pond by the great wall, 2012
- I saw mice burying a cat, 2011
- The sparrow who kept his word, 2010
- Boy. The Rain Horse, 2008
- Declaration of love, 2006
- Handicraft, 2004
- The little night symphony, 2003
- Hello from Kislovodsk, 2001
- Mystery - it’s you, 1998

== Awards ==
Man meets woman

- Grand Prix. Best animation film. Festival "Window to Europe" Vyborg, 2014
- The Best Film for Adults "Tindirindis" Vilnius, Lithuania, 2014
- Prize of the Guild of Film Critics and Cinema Journalists Russia. "Suzdal", 2014
- 2nd place in professional rating. Open Russian Festival of Animated Film, 2014
- Best art director (Anna Karpova). National Animation Award "Ikar", 2015
- Best composer (Artem Fadeev). National Animation Award "Ikar", 2015
- Best sound director (Artem Fadeev). National Animation Award "Ikar", 2015
- Best producer (Lyubov Gaidukova). National Animation Award "Ikar", 2015
- "Special mention jury" WFAF. Varna, Bulgaria, 2014
- Prize "the Best director". Tofuzi. Batumi, Georgia, 2014
- "Special mention jury". Festival "Insomnia", 2014

I saw mice burying a cat

- Grand Prix. Hiroshima International Animation Festival 2012
- Best Short Film in 2011. National Award of China Association of animators "Golden monkey" China, 2012
- Special Jury prize. Open Russian Festival of Animated Film, 2012
- Special Jury prize. Festival "Window to Europe" Vyborg, 2012

The sparrow who kept his word

- Best film for children. Open Russian Festival of Animated Film, 2011
- First Prize. Festival "Orlenok". Russia, 2011
- Best animation film for children. Festival "Golden Fish". Russia, 2011
- Best animation film. Festival "Radiant Angel". Russia, 2011
- Best animation film. Festival "Siyazhar". Russia, 2011
- 2nd place. Professional Jury award. Anima Mundi (event) 2011
- 3rd place. Children Jury award. Festival "Radiant Angel". Russia, 2011
- Diploma. For the good clever fairy tale for children and not only. Festival "Film - children". Russia, 2011

Boy. The Rain Horse

- Grand Prix. Best animation film. Festival "Kinofest" Romania, 2008
- Grand Prix. Best animation film. Festival "Window to Europe" Vyborg, 2008
- Prize of the Guild of Film Critics and Cinema Journalists Russia "White elephant" in the nomination "The best animated film of the year.", 2008
- Diplome of Guild of film critics. Festival "Window to Europe" Vyborg, 2008
- Prize "Bright Impression". Festival "Golden fish" Russia, 2008
- 2nd place. A professional rating. Open Russian Festival of Animated Film, 2008

Declaration of love

- Prize of Guild of film critics. Festival "Suzdal". Russia, 2006
- 2nd place. A professional rating. Open Russian Festival of Animated Film 2006
- 2nd place. Festival "Multivision". St. Petersburg, Russia, 2006
- Special prize. KROK International Animated Films Festival. Ukraine, 2007

The little night symphony

- Grand Prix. KROK International Animated Films Festival 2004
- prize Grand. Open Russian Festival of Animated Film 2004
- Prize of alliance of designers. "Window to Europe" Vyborg, Russia, 2004
- Prize "Best experimental film". "Animayevka". Belarus, 2004
- Prize "Best sound". Fantoche, 2005
- Prize. Festival "Gato de luna". Espana, 2007

Hello from Kislovodsk

- Grand Prix. Open Russian Festival of Animated Film 2001
- Grand Prix. KROK International Animated Films Festival 2001
- Grand Prix. Festival. "Cinanima". Portugal, 2001
- Prize for best debut. Annecy International Animated Film Festival 2001
- Prize for best debut. Seoul International Cartoon and Animation Festival 2001
- Special prize. Festival Stuttgart, Germany, 2002
- Prize "Saint Anna Second Class". Festival of student films. Russia, 2001
- Prize of magazine Premier. "Window to Europe" Vyborg, 2001

Mystery - it’s you

- Prize of the festival of "Extra short film festival". Novosibirsk, Russia
