= The Solitude of Prime Numbers (soundtrack) =

2011 soundtrack album by Mike Patton

Soundtrack album by Mike Patton
- Released: November 1, 2011
- Genre: Film soundtrack, ambient music, modern classical
- Length: 35:39
- Label: Ipecac Recordings

Mike Patton chronology
Mondo Cane (2010)	The Solitude of Prime Numbers (soundtrack) (2011)	Laborintus II (2012)

Professional ratings
Review scores
Source	Rating
AllMusic	3.5/5 stars
Classic Rock	8/10 stars

The Solitude of Prime Numbers (2011) is a soundtrack album by Mike Patton for the film The Solitude of Prime Numbers, directed by Saverio Costanzo. The album contains all the music used in the film, along with additional pieces that the director rejected. It also includes music inspired by Patton's reading of the novel in both the original Italian and English translation.

The track "The Snow Angel" was later featured in The Place Beyond the Pines (2012), Patton's next film score. An edited, slowed-down version was also used in that film's trailer.

== Track listing ==
The track listing numbers each track by chronological prime numbers, referencing the film's title.

No.	Title	Length
2.	"Twin Primes"	1:56
3.	"Identity Matrix"	0:56
5.	"Method of Infinite Descent"	2:17
7.	"Contrapositive"	3:04
11.	"Cicatrix"	2:02
13.	"Abscissa"	1:41
17.	"Isolated Primes"	1:42
19.	"Radius of Convergence"	4:24
23.	"Separatrix"	1:00
29.	"The Snow Angel"	1:42
31.	"Apnoea"	1:29
37.	"Supersingular Primes"	0:54
41.	"Quadratrix"	1:01
43.	"Calculus of Finite Differences"	3:05
47.	"Zeroth"	1:26
53.	"Weight of Consequences (Quod Erat Demonstrandum)"	7:05

== Personnel ==
- Mike Patton – composer, performer, recording, mixing, production
- S. Husky Hoskulds – mastering
- Martin Kvamme – packaging design
- Observatoriet – photography
