= The Raging Wrath of the Easter Bunny Demo =

Studio album by Mr. Bungle
- Released: October 30, 2020
- Studio: Studio 606
- Genres: Crossover thrash; thrash metal; hardcore punk; death metal
- Length: 56:27
- Label: Ipecac
- Producer: Mr. Bungle

Mr. Bungle chronology
California (1999)	The Raging Wrath of the Easter Bunny Demo (2020)

Singles from The Raging Wrath of the Easter Bunny Demo
- 1. "Raping Your Mind" Released: August 13, 2020; 2. "Eracist" Released: September 24, 2020; 3. "Sudden Death" Released: October 23, 2020

The Raging Wrath of the Easter Bunny Demo is the fourth full length studio album by American experimental rock band Mr. Bungle, released on October 30, 2020, through Ipecac Recordings. It serves as their first album after a 20-year hiatus and subsequent reunion in February that year, while also marking their first release through Ipecac, which was co-founded by lead vocalist Mike Patton.

== Background ==
This is a re-recording of the band's first self-released demo tape of the same name from 1986. It is their first album to be released in over 20 years. Along with founding members Mike Patton, Trey Spruance and Trevor Dunn, it features Anthrax guitarist Scott Ian and former Slayer drummer Dave Lombardo.

== Promotion ==
The band announced shortly after the reunion tour, they would be in the studio working on a re-recording of the demo that was performed in its entirety (with the exception of "Evil Satan" and most of "Hypocrites", which was shortened and filled out with a Stormtroopers of Death cover) along with three unrecorded songs in an interview with Revolver Magazine.

On August 13, 2020, the band revealed the album and the first single "Raping Your Mind" with a music video posted on YouTube. This was followed by the release of a second single, and music video, for the song "Eracist" on September 24, 2020.

On October 23, 2020, the band released the third single and closing track "Sudden Death" for streaming.

== Critical reception ==
Professional ratings
Aggregate scores
Source	Rating
Metacritic	81/100
Review scores
Source	Rating
AllMusic	4/5 stars
Clash	7/10
Classic Rock	4/5 stars
Consequence of Sound	A−
Exclaim!	8/10
Glide	4/5 stars
Kerrang!	4/5 stars
Metal Hammer	4/5 stars
Metal Injection	9/10
The Music	3.5/5 stars

According to the review aggregator Metacritic, The Raging Wrath of the Easter Bunny Demo received "universal acclaim" based on a weighted average score of 81 out of 100 from nine critic scores.

Consequence of Sound rated the album A−, stating, "The album could stand to be 10 minutes shorter, but who's to complain about having too much of a good thing? Recorded pre-pandemic, the joy and enthusiasm of the reunion tour is captured here and the results are immensely entertaining. If you like thrash, then the Raging Wrath of the Easter Bunny Demo is mandatory listening."

Clash gave the album 7/10, writing, "There's a school of thought that argues Bungle's talents are wasted in this context. There are no audacious genre- surfers like 'Goodbye Sober Day' or 'Desert Search For Techno Allah'. For believers, it's great to have them back."

== Track listing ==
The Raging Wrath of the Easter Bunny Demo track listing
No.	Title	Writer(s)	Length
1.	"Grizzly Adams"	Trey Spruance	2:55
2.	"Anarchy Up Your Anus"	Spruance	2:15
3.	"Raping Your Mind"	Trevor Dunn	5:53
4.	"Hypocrites / Habla Español O Muere" (Stormtroopers of Death cover)	Mike Patton; Dunn; Stormtroopers of Death	3:43
5.	"Bungle Grind"	Spruance	6:30
6.	"Methematics"	Patton; Dunn	8:45
7.	"Eracist"	Patton	3:52
8.	"Spreading the Thighs of Death"	Dunn	5:59
9.	"Loss for Words" (Corrosion of Conformity cover)	Mike Dean; Woody Weatherman; Reed Mullin	4:16
10.	"Glutton for Punishment"	Dunn	4:49
11.	"Sudden Death"	Patton	7:30
Total length:			56:27

== Personnel ==
Mr. Bungle

- Mike Patton – vocals
- Trey Spruance – lead guitar
- Trevor Dunn – bass
- Scott Ian – rhythm guitar
- Dave Lombardo – drums

Additional personnel

- Rhea Perlman – narration on "Anarchy Up Your Anus"

Production

- Husky Hoskulds – recording engineer
- Jay Ruston – mixing and mastering
- John Douglass – assistant
- Maor Appelbaum – mastering preparation for manufacturing

== Charts ==
Chart performance for The Raging Wrath of the Easter Bunny Demo
Chart (2020)	Peak position
Australian Albums (ARIA)	6
Austrian Albums (Ö3 Austria)	31
Belgian Albums (Ultratop Flanders)	75
Belgian Albums (Ultratop Wallonia)	44
Dutch Albums (Album Top 100)	96
Finnish Albums (Suomen virallinen lista)	15
French Albums (SNEP)	110
German Albums (Offizielle Top 100)	29
New Zealand Albums (RMNZ)	24
Scottish Albums (Official Charts)	18
Spanish Albums (PROMUSICAE)	85
Swiss Albums (Schweizer Hitparade)	25
UK Albums (Official Charts)	53
US Billboard 200	30
