= California (Mr. Bungle album) =

Studio album by Mr. Bungle
- Released: July 13, 1999
- Recorded: Late 1998
- Studio: Various studios across San Francisco
- Genres: Experimental rock; doo-wop; noise rock
- Length: 44:16
- Label: Warner Bros.
- Producer: Mr. Bungle

Mr. Bungle chronology
Disco Volante (1995)	California (1999)	The Raging Wrath of the Easter Bunny Demo (2020)

California is the third studio album by the American experimental rock band Mr. Bungle. It was released on July 13, 1999, through Warner Bros.

== Musical style and writing ==
The album's 1999 press kit by Warner Bros. Records states:

California explores an ambiance new to the band, conjuring up the surly dance moves of Cyd Charisse and Fred Astaire; digging through the graveyard of riffs to find English pop, Elvis, Neil Diamond and Michael Jackson. The album is sure to alienate those expecting weird meter-changes and heartless vulgarities. To be sure, this is Western music, chockful of backbeats, strings and vocal harmonies. But like the original 49ers, the listener is headed into a desert land of drought and famine — the dark side of the California Dream.

The songwriting process for California was much less collaborative than the band's previous albums. Despite having a more accessible sound than prior releases, saxophonist Clinton McKinnon has stated that this "wasn't some conscious attempt to normalise our music or make it all the more palatable." On the album's writing and sound, Trevor Dunn stated in a 2017 interview that "[we] never discussed our projected direction. We never sat down and said, 'ok the last record was like that so now let's attempt this.' Instead we individually brought things to the collective table that somehow coalesced without premeditation."

Dunn recalled that "the recording of California was a bit of a nightmare. We attempted frugality by recording a lot in our rehearsal space which Trey [Spruance] had partially turned into a recording studio. But we also spread the work out over various outside studios with a number of engineers as well as additional musicians. In the end we had two 24-track tape machines and two ADAT machines linked. That record would have been much easier to manage had Pro Tools come along a bit sooner."

Regarding the album's title, drummer Danny Heifetz said in 1999, "More than anything, that title really sums up sonically what's going on on the record. It's very pleasant at times, and then there are a lot of little disasters that come up and present themselves, then blow over and go away like a storm. I would tend to explain it more like that, rather than, 'Oh, California is this very deceptive place; it's bright on the outside and a really dark place on the inside.' I mean, let's let the Chili Peppers do that." Trey Spruance, who had recently covered the Beach Boys' "Good Vibrations" with his Secret Chiefs 3 project for the Beach Boys tribute album Smiling Pets, said that the work of the Beach Boys' Brian Wilson was "definitely" an influence, "especially when it comes to the Faustian scale of it."

== Promotion and touring ==
To support the album, Mr. Bungle toured North America, Europe and Australia. They also notably appeared on the 2000 edition of the SnoCore Tour, which also featured Incubus, Puya, and System of a Down. The members of Incubus and System of a Down have cited both Mr. Bungle and Patton's other band Faith No More as major influences. According to Dunn, Mr. Bungle were "completely out of place" on the tour: "We were sort of the grandpas of the tour, so we started really messing with the audiences. We dressed up like the Village People and acted super gay which really pissed off the metal kids." According to Spruance, "some of us were going, 'Well ... I guess ... this’ll be an ... adventure?' And that was the whole spirit we went into it with. You know, there's this thing of, 'Yeah, man, we'll reach all these other people! We can expand the audience!' I didn't fucking believe that for a second. That kind of logic—it doesn't get you anywhere; it doesn't work. It's a recipe for failure and disaster." When asked about the hostile audiences the band were subject to during the SnoCore shows, Spruance said, "those can be just magic moments. That's definitely when Mike is at his best."

Dunn recalls that at one Snocore show in Myrtle Beach, South Carolina, the crowd were so angry towards Mr. Bungle that he thought they "might actually kill us." At the Myrtle Beach show, Patton simulated performing fellatio on his microphone in order to tease the crowd, which angered them so much that they started throwing coins and other objects at the band. The members of Incubus and System of a Down were supportive of Mr. Bungle when they were met with harsh audiences, and cheered on Patton when he got into confrontations with crowds.

=== Red Hot Chili Peppers conflict ===
A controversy with the Red Hot Chili Peppers developed during the album's release, reigniting Patton's feud with Red Hot Chili Peppers lead singer Anthony Kiedis. California was scheduled to be released on June 8, 1999, but Warner Bros. Records, the record label of both bands, pushed the release date back to July 13 as not to coincide with the Red Hot Chili Peppers' Californication, which was to be released on the same day. Following the album release date conflict, Kiedis had Mr. Bungle removed from a series of summer festivals in Europe that were due to feature both bands. The reasoning behind his actions has never been explained, although he had been involved in a public dispute with Patton and Faith No More a decade prior after claiming that Patton was imitating him. According to Mr. Bungle themselves, Kiedis did not personally know any member of the band besides Patton. Patton himself stated that "the rest of the band doesn't care. It's something to do with Anthony."

As a result of the concert removals, Mr. Bungle parodied the Red Hot Chili Peppers at a show on Halloween 1999 in Pontiac, Michigan. Patton introduced each Mr. Bungle member with the name of one of the Red Hot Chili Peppers (including Spruance as the ghost of the late Red Hot Chili Peppers guitarist Hillel Slovak), before covering the songs "Give It Away", "Around the World", "Under the Bridge" and "Scar Tissue", with Patton deliberately using incorrect lyrics poking fun at the band's image and drug use. Patton impersonated Kiedis by wearing a blonde wig and speaking with a lisp, and while pretending to be Kiedis, mockingly said to the crowd: "Don't you call me Mike, my name is Anthony. How dare you make that mistake. Mike has been ripping me off for many years." The other members of Mr. Bungle satirized many of the mannerisms of the band, including pretending to inject drugs during the performance, as well as mocking deceased friend of the band River Phoenix.

Regarding the Halloween show, Trey Spruance said, "It was pretty weird, having been fans of the first two RHCP albums, realizing that somehow something personal had gone amiss somewhere. So amiss that a decade and a half after we'd liked this now hugely popular band's music (and hadn't thought much about since), we'd be dealing with the fact that they were unmistakably trying to bury us. Why keep quiet? I remember drawing everybody's tattoos. James Rotundi [sic] our touring keyboardist knew the band's more recent music, and he's a great guitarist, so he did those duties." Dunn reflected: "We had a member of the tour crew buy the most recent album of them (Californication) and then we proceeded to learn it in the back of the stage before the show. It wasn't hard. The hardest part was copying his tattoos with a permanent marker. I remember it was very funny to ridicule them without thinking about whether they would be aware or not. We were pretty pissed off for all the financial and personal damage that they caused to us based on their egos and freaks of power. We should probably have sued them."

Kiedis responded to the Halloween show by having Mr. Bungle removed from the 2000 Big Day Out festival in Australia and New Zealand: “I would not have given fucking two fucks if they fucking played there with us. But after I fucking heard about [the] fucking Halloween show where they mocked us, fuck [Patton] and fuck the whole fucking band. I hope they all die”. Patton claimed that Kiedis' actions had "ruined" Mr. Bungle's career in a 2001 interview following the band's breakup, while Dunn remarked that "It really screwed us up. It screwed up my life in a personal way." Mr. Bungle officially split in 2004, although they had been on hiatus since playing their final concert on September 9, 2000 in Nottingham, England.

Trevor Dunn performing in his California attire during a 2000 show in Germany.

On his personal website, Dunn later wrote that "Everything you've ever heard about the Red Hot Chile Poppers [sic] screwing us is true. I'm not sure why they did it other than a non-singer's jealousy...Ultimately they screwed ME [sic] out of a lot of money for which I will forever harbor anger. The best part is they had full support from their record label."

=== Live performances ===
On previous tours, Mr. Bungle were known for their unconventional stage shows, where the band members would dress up in costumes and masks. The 1999-2000 shows in support of California often featured Dunn dressed as a blonde girl resembling Goldilocks or the St. Pauli Girl, although for the other members this period was largely devoid of elaborate masks and outfits due to the increased demands of the music.

As with the band's previous tour, songs from the group's self-titled debut and independent demos were largely absent, with the exceptions of "Travolta", a new arrangement of "My Ass Is on Fire", and several songs from the band's 1986 demo tape The Raging Wrath of the Easter Bunny which were interpolated during the Disco Volante track "Merry Go Bye Bye".

== Critical reception and legacy ==
Professional ratings
Review scores
Source	Rating
AllMusic	4/5 stars
Alternative Press	4/5 stars
NME	6/10
Pitchfork	7.3/10
Spin	7/10

California was well-received by critics. A positive review came from Pitchfork, who called it "one of those albums that you can't believe a major label had anything to do with" and quipped that "Mike Patton is really the devil on holiday." Steve Huey of AllMusic similarly remarked that the album "[will] make you marvel at the fact that such a defiantly odd, uncommercial band recorded for Warner Bros." In 2017, Exclaim! cited it as an essential album in the Mike Patton discography which "maintained the strange stylings that Mr. Bungle fans had come to love by that point, but remains beautiful and melodic to this day."

Experimental artist Igorrr was greatly influenced by the album, especially "Ars Moriendi". The 2005 song "Unretrofied" (from the album Miss Machine) by the Dillinger Escape Plan, who opened for Mr. Bungle on their 1999 North American tour in support of California, was inspired by the feelings that "Retrovertigo" evoked in guitarist and bandleader Ben Weinman. In June 2017, Avenged Sevenfold released a cover version of "Retrovertigo".

=== Accolades ===
Year	Publication	Country	Accolade	Rank
1999	Rolling Stone	Germany	"Albums of the Year"	15

== Track listing ==
All lyrics are written by Mike Patton, except where noted.

No.	Title	Lyrics	Music	Length
1.	"Sweet Charity"		Patton	5:05
2.	"None of Them Knew They Were Robots"	Trey Spruance	Spruance, Patton, Danny Heifetz	6:03
3.	"Retrovertigo"	Trevor Dunn	Dunn	4:59
4.	"The Air-Conditioned Nightmare"		Patton, Clinton "Bär" McKinnon	3:55
5.	"Ars Moriendi"		Patton	4:10
6.	"Pink Cigarette"		Spruance, Patton	4:55
7.	"Golem II: The Bionic Vapour Boy"	Spruance	Spruance	3:34
8.	"The Holy Filament"	Dunn	Dunn	4:04
9.	"Vanity Fair"		Dunn, Patton	2:58
10.	"Goodbye Sober Day"		Patton, McKinnon	4:29
Total length:				44:16

== Personnel ==
=== Mr. Bungle ===
- Trevor Dunn – bass guitar, artwork concept, production
- Danny Heifetz – percussion, drums, keyboards, production
- Clinton "Bär" McKinnon – saxophone, keyboards, French horn, production
- Mike Patton – vocals, keyboards, artwork concept, production
- Trey Spruance – guitar, engineering, "production strategy", production

=== Additional personnel ===
- Bill Banovetz – cor anglais
- Sam Bass – cello
- Ben Barnes – violin, viola
- Henri Ducharme – accordion
- Timba Harris – trumpet
- Marika Hughes – cello
- Eyvind Kang – violin, viola
- Carla Kihlstedt – violin, viola
- Michael Peloquin – harmonica
- David Phillips – pedal steel guitar
- Larry Ragent – French horn
- Jay Stebley – cimbalom
- Aaron Seeman – piano
- William Winant – timpani, mallets, tam-tam, bass drum

=== Technical personnel ===
- Billy Anderson – engineering
- Gibbs Chapman – mixing
- Ryan Cooper – publicity
- Elizabeth Gregory – legal representation
- Josh Heller – engineering
- Malcom Hillier – sleeve photography
- George Horn – mastering
- Adam Muñoz – engineering, mixing and editing
- Mackie Osborne – sleeve layout and graphic design
- Justin Phelps – engineering
- Rob Worthington – mixing
