= Six Litanies for Heliogabalus =

Studio album by John Zorn
- Released: March 27, 2007
- Genre: Avant-garde jazz; avant-garde metal; noise rock; free jazz; a cappella
- Length: 44:34
- Label: Tzadik TZ 7361
- Producer: John Zorn

Moonchild Trio chronology
Astronome (2006)	Six Litanies for Heliogabalus (2007)	The Crucible (2008)

John Zorn chronology
Moloch: Book of Angels Volume 6 (2006)	Six Litanies for Heliogabals (2007)	From Silence to Sorcery (2007)

Professional ratings
Review scores
Source	Rating
Allmusic	4.5/5 stars

Six Litanies for Heliogabalus is an album by John Zorn. It is the third album to feature the "Moonchild Trio" of Mike Patton, Joey Baron and Trevor Dunn, following Moonchild: Songs Without Words (2005) and Astronome (2006) and the first to feature additional performers. The promotional notes that accompany the US CD Release indicate that the concept for the recording was inspired by the Roman Emperor Heliogabalus.

== Track listing ==
No.	Title	Length
1.	"Litany I"	7:53
2.	"Litany II"	7:06
3.	"Litany III"	10:36
4.	"Litany IV"	8:13
5.	"Litany V"	4:30
6.	"Litany VI"	6:16
Total length:		44:34

All compositions by John Zorn

== Personnel ==
- John Zorn – alto sax, composer, conductor
- Joey Baron – drums
- Trevor Dunn – bass
- Ikue Mori – electronics
- Mike Patton – voice
- Jamie Saft – organ
- Martha Cluver – voice
- Abby Fischer – voice
- Kirsten Sollek – voice
