= A Perfect Place =

- Directed by: Derrick Scocchera
- Written by: Derrick Scocchera
- Produced by: Derrick Scocchera, Ian Hendrie, Ben Nichols, Phil Parmet, Ellen Martin, Alex Rockwell
- Starring: Mark Boone Junior, Bill Moseley
- Cinematography: Hiro Narita
- Edited by: Derrick Scocchera
- Music by: Mike Patton
- Distributed by: Fantoma Films, Ipecac Recordings
- Release date: February 2, 2008
- Running time: 25 minutes
- Country: United States
- Language: English
- Budget: $50,000 (estimated)

A Perfect Place is a black-and-white tragic comedy short directed, produced, and written by Derrick Scocchera starring Mark Boone Junior and Bill Moseley, first released on 2 February 2008 at the Lake County Film Festival. It was filmed in entirely in Alameda, Oakland and San Francisco, California under a budget of $50,000.

== Cast ==
- Mark Boone Junior – Tom
- Bill Moseley – Eddie
- Todd Lookinland – The Cheat
- Isabelle Maynard – Mrs. Newburg
- Tom Miller – Dennis
- Peter De Luca – Mr. Newburg

== Soundtrack ==
A Perfect Place

Soundtrack album by Mike Patton
- Released: March 11, 2008
- Recorded: Vulcan Lab, San Francisco
- Genre: Experimental
- Length: 35:20
- Label: Ipecac Recordings
- Producer: Mike Patton

Mike Patton chronology
Pranzo Oltranzista (1997)	A Perfect Place (2008)	Crank: High Voltage (2009)

Soundtrack
Review scores
Source	Rating
Allmusic	link

The soundtrack comprises the third non-aliased solo release by Mike Patton, who wrote, produced and performed all tracks (with the exception of some percussion parts), released on March 11, 2008 under his own Ipecac Recordings with special edition copies of the album being released with a bonus DVD containing the film. The score itself is 10 minutes longer than the film because Patton "got excited" and has been well received by critics with allmusic giving it a four out of five star rating and crediting Patton for the "depth of his orchestral arrangements" calling them "surprisingly mature".

=== Track listing ===
All tracks written by Mike Patton except some percussion parts as noted here.

1. "Main Title" – 3:15
2. "A Perfect Place" – 3:30
3. "Car Radio (AM)" – 1:01
4. "A Perfect Twist (Vocal)" – 2:44
5. "A Little Poker Tomorrow Night?" – 3:10
6. "Seriously Disturbed" – 1:18
7. "A Dream of Roses" – 2:34
8. "A Perfect Place/Main Title (Reprise)" – 2:45
9. "Batucada" – 2:18
10. "Another Perfect Place" – 1:42
11. "Car Radio (FM)" – 1:55
12. "Swinging the Body" – 1:57
13. "Catholic Tribe" – 2:28
14. "Il Cupo Dolore" – 2:06
15. "A Perfect End" – 2:46

=== Personnel ===
- Mike Patton – percussion, producer, mixing, musician
- Danny Heifetz, William Winant – percussion on tracks 1 and 9
- Gavin Lurssen – mastering
