= Crank: High Voltage (soundtrack) =

Crank: High Voltage Original Motion Picture Soundtrack

Soundtrack album by Mike Patton
- Released: 2009
- Length: 54:58

Mike Patton chronology
A Perfect Place (2008)	Crank: High Voltage Original Motion Picture Soundtrack (2009)	Mondo Cane (2010)

Professional ratings
Review scores
Source	Rating
Allmusic	3.5/5 stars
IGN	(9.5/10)

Crank: High Voltage is the soundtrack for the 2009 film of the same name, composed and mostly performed by Mike Patton. It is similar to his work with Fantômas, as both this soundtrack and the band's studio album Suspended Animation feature the same mix of intense noise with a wide variety of musical genres. with most songs under two minutes.

== Track listing ==
1. "Kickin’"
2. "Chelios"
3. "Sweet Cream (Redux)"
4. "Organ Donor"
5. "Chickenscratch"
6. "Tourettes Romance"
7. "Doc Miles"
8. "El Huron"
9. "Tourettes Breakdance"
10. "Juice Me"
11. "Hallucination"
12. "Porn Strike"
13. "Surgery"
14. "Social Club"
15. "Chocolate Theme"
16. "Ball Torture"
17. "Chevzilla"
18. "The Hammer Drops"
19. "Triad Limo"
20. "Shock & Shootout"
21. "Pixelvision"
22. "Spring Loaded"
23. "Verona"
24. "Car Park Throwdown"
25. "Noticias"
26. "Catalina Island"
27. "Supercharged"
28. "Massage Parlor"
29. "Full Body Tourettes"
30. "Epilogue – In My Dreams"
31. "Friction"
32. "Epiphany"
