= Orobas: Book of Angels Volume 4 =

Studio album by Koby Israelite
- Released: March 21, 2006
- Recorded: November–December, 2005
- Genre: Avant-garde, contemporary classical music, jazz, klezmer
- Length: 48:18
- Label: Tzadik
- Producer: John Zorn

Book of Angels chronology
Malphas: Book of Angels Volume 3 (2006)	Orobas: Book of Angels Volume 4 (2006)	Balan: Book of Angels Volume 5 (2006)

Koby Israelite chronology
Mood Swings (2005)	Orobas: Book of Angels Volume 4 (2006)	Is He Listening? (2009)

Orobas: Book of Angels Volume 4 is an album by Koby Israelite performing compositions from John Zorn's second Masada book, "The Book of Angels".

== Reception ==
The Allmusic review by Thom Jurek awarded the album 4 stars stating "Orobas: Book of Angels, Vol. 4 is another essential Four-for-four and counting. This is the most exhilarating set of recordings Tzadik has offered in quite some time. For those who haven't yet checkout Israelite, this is a fantastic opportunity".

Professional ratings
Review scores
Source	Rating
Allmusic	4/5 stars
All About Jazz	(favorable)

== Track listing ==
All compositions by John Zorn.

1. "Rampel" - 6:31
2. "Zafiel" - 4:40
3. "Ezgadi" - 5:16
4. "Nisroc" - 4:56
5. "Negef" - 5:54
6. "Khabiel" - 6:28
7. "Chayo" - 6:27
8. "Rachmiel" - 8:08

- Recorded in London, UK in November–December 2005

== Personnel ==
- Koby Israelite – drums, percussion, accordion, keyboards, guitar, bouzouki, Indian banjo, vocals, flute, electric bass, cajón, arrangements
- Sid Gauld – trumpet
- Yaron Stavi – basses, vocals
- Stewart Curtis – recorder, piccolo, clarinet
