= Moonchild: Songs Without Words =

Studio album by John Zorn
- Released: April 18, 2006
- Genre: Free improvisation; avant-garde jazz; avant-garde metal; experimental rock; post-rock; noise
- Length: 45:14
- Label: Tzadik

Moonchild Trio chronology
Moonchild: Songs Without Words (2006)	Astronome (2006)

John Zorn chronology
Orobas: Book of Angels Volume 4 (2006)	Moonchild: Songs Without Words (2006)	Balan: Book of Angels Volume 5 (2006)

Professional ratings
Review scores
Source	Rating
Allmusic	4/5 stars

Moonchild: Songs Without Words is a 2006 album by John Zorn featuring performances by Joey Baron, Mike Patton, and Trevor Dunn (sometimes referred to as the "Moonchild Trio"). It was inspired in part by Aleister Crowley, who wrote the novel Moonchild, Antonin Artaud, and Edgard Varèse. Moonchild: Songs Without Words has been performed internationally by the trio, conducted by John Zorn.

== Track listing ==
No.	Title	Length
1.	"Hellfire"	4:07
2.	"Ghosts of Thelema"	4:32
3.	"Abraxas"	3:13
4.	"Possession"	5:21
5.	"Caligula"	1:47
6.	"616"	5:20
7.	"Equinox"	4:07
8.	"Moonchild"	6:51
9.	"Le Part Maudit"	2:49
10.	"The Summoning"	2:30
11.	"Sorceress"	4:37

== Personnel ==
- John Zorn – producer, conductor
- Trevor Dunn – bass
- Joey Baron – drums
- Mike Patton – voice
