= Balan: Book of Angels Volume 5 =

Studio album by Cracow Klezmer Band
- Released: 23 May 2006
- Recorded: February 13 and March 1, 2006
- Genre: Avant-garde, contemporary classical music, jazz, klezmer
- Length: 40:00
- Label: Tzadik
- Producer: Cracow Klezmer Band

Book of Angels chronology
Orobas: Book of Angels Volume 4 (2006)	Balan: Book of Angels Volume 5 (2006)	Moloch: Book of Angels Volume 6 (2006)

Cracow Klezmer Band chronology
Sanatorium Under the Sign of the Hourglass (2005)	Balan: Book of Angels Volume 5 (2006)	Remembrance (2007)

Balan: Book of Angels Volume 5 is an album by the Cracow Klezmer Band performing compositions from John Zorn's second Masada book, The Book of Angels.

== Reception ==
The Allmusic review by Thom Jurek awarded the album 4 stars, calling it an "entrancing, ingenious, and by all means exotic recording".

Professional ratings
Review scores
Source	Rating
Allmusic	4/5 stars

== Track listing ==
All compositions by John Zorn.

1. "Zuriel" - 4:18
2. "Suria" - 7:56
3. "Lirael" - 6:07
4. "Kadosh" - 2:43
5. "Haniel" - 5:02
6. "Jehoel" - 5:17
7. "Asbeel" - 5:05
8. "Aniel" - 3:48
- Recorded at Studio 2002 in Kraków on February 13, February 19 and March 1, 2006

== Personnel ==
- Jaroslaw Bester – bayan
- Oleg Dyyak – percussion
- Wojciech Front – double bass
- Jaroslaw Tyrala – violin
- Jorgos Skolias – vocal
- Ireneusz Socha – computer instruments
- Special Guests - the DAFO string quartet
- Anna Armatys – cello
- Danuta Augustyn – violin
- Justyna Duda – violin
- Aneta Dumanowska – viola
