= Astronome =

Studio album by John Zorn
- Released: October 17, 2006
- Genre: Experimental rock; avant-garde metal; avant-prog; avant-garde jazz; noise rock; free jazz
- Length: 44:30
- Label: Tzadik TZ 7359

Moonchild chronology
Moonchild: Songs Without Words (2006)	Astronome (2006)	Six Litanies for Heliogabalus (2007)

John Zorn chronology
Balan: Book of Angels Volume 5 (2006)	Astronome (2006)	Moloch: Book of Angels Volume 6 (2006)

Professional ratings
Review scores
Source	Rating
AllMusic	4/5 stars

Astronome is an album by American musician John Zorn featuring the "Moonchild Trio" of Joey Baron, Mike Patton and Trevor Dunn. It is the second album by the trio, following Moonchild: Songs Without Words.

Theater director Richard Foreman staged an opera Astronome: A Night at the Opera: An Initiation based on this album which premiered at the Ontological-Hysteric Theater on February 5, 2009, and ran through April 5, 2009.

== Track listing ==
No.	Title	Length
1.	"Act One: A Secluded Clearing in the Woods; A Single Bed in a Small Room; The Innermost Chapel of a Secret Temple"	14:34
2.	"Act Two: A Medieval Laboratory; In the Magick Circle"	17:02
3.	"Act Three: A Barren Plain at Midnight; An Unnamed Location"	12:44
Total length:		44:30

== Musicians ==
- Joey Baron – drums
- Mike Patton – voice
- Trevor Dunn – bass
