= Laborintus II (album) =

- Album cover

Live album by Mike Patton, Ictus Ensemble and Nederlands Kamerkoor
- Released: July 10, 2012
- Recorded: June 18, 2010
- Length: 32:09
- Language: Italian, English
- Label: Ipecac Recordings (IPC-133)
- Producer: Mike Patton, Greg Werckman, Lieven Bertels, Jean-Luc Plouvier

Mike Patton chronology
The Solitude of Prime Numbers (2011)	Laborintus II (2012)	The Place Beyond the Pines (2013)

Laborintus II is an album by the Belgian orchestra Ictus Ensemble, the vocal group Nederlands Kamerkoor, and the American vocalist Mike Patton, which was recorded live at the 2010 Holland Festival. It was released on July 10, 2012, by Ipecac Recordings, and debuted at number 23 on the American Billboard Classical Albums Chart. It was not well received by critics.

The album is a recording of the 1965 work of the same name by Italian composer Luciano Berio, whose composition employs elements of jazz and electronic music. The libretto by Edoardo Sanguineti borrows ideas from the works of Dante Alighieri, T. S. Eliot and Ezra Pound, and his own 1956 poem "Laborintus". Berio named "memory, death and usury" as the work's main concerns, believing these themes to be present in Dante's work.

== Production ==
Laborintus II is a recording of a 1965 composition by Luciano Berio, written to celebrate the 700th anniversary of Dante Alighieri's birth. The libretto, or lyric book, was provided by Edoardo Sanguineti, who included elements of his 1956 poem Laborintus in it. AllMusic's Thom Jurek described the original poem as speaking of "the timelessness of love and mourning, while acting as a critique of the commoditization of all things". In addition to Sanguineti's own poetry, which is based on themes found in Dante's Divina Commedia, Convivio and La Vita Nuova, the work uses excerpts from the Bible and the writings of poets T. S. Eliot and Ezra Pound. Musically, Laborintus II incorporates elements of jazz and electronic music while sometimes evoking the style of 17th-century Italian composer Claudio Monteverdi.

Berio described the main structure as a "catalogue, in its medieval meaning" (exemplified by Isidore of Seville's seventh century encyclopaedia Etymologiae), using Dante's themes of "memory, death and usury", and wrote: "Individual words and sentences are sometimes to be regarded as autonomous entities, and sometimes to be perceived as part of the sound structure as a whole." Members of the Dutch choir Nederlands Kamerkoor, who performed on the recording, have also cited usury as a key theme in the work, and described the composition as "an indictment against the practice". (Note: Original text—"Het libretto kan gelezen worden als een aanklacht tegen de praktijk van woekeraars") The instrumentation for Laborintus II was written as an "extension" of the vocal material; its electronic section is likewise an extension of the instrumental music. Berio used car tyres and a blow-up doll on stage in a performance of the work at the Holland Festival in 1973.

The album was recorded live at Amsterdam's Holland Festival on June 18, 2010, in the Muziekgebouw aan 't IJ. It was performed by Mike Patton and the Belgian Ictus Ensemble conducted by Georges-Elie Octors. Solos were performed by Ictus Ensemble clarinetist Dirk Descheemaeker, trumpeter Loïc Dumoulin, trombonist Michel Massot, double bass player Géry Cambier and percussionists Michael Weilacher and Gerrit Nulens. Nederlands Kamerkoor provided the choral accompaniments. The album marks only the third recording of the composition to have been released since it was first broadcast on French radio by Office de Radiodiffusion Télévision Française.

== Composition ==
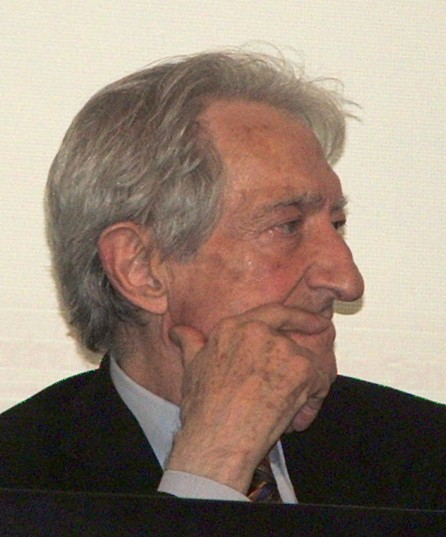
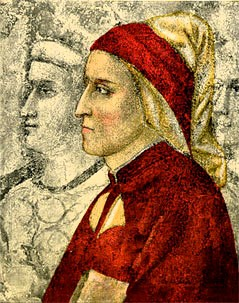
Laborintus II features a libretto by Edoardo Sanguineti (left), based on the work of Dante Alighieri (right, portrait by Giotto).

Laborintus II combines orchestral, choral and spoken elements within its three parts. Patton's narration is in Italian, although taped samples feature Sanguineti speaking in English. Patton uses a range of vocal techniques—including whispering, singing and shouting—throughout the work. The choral parts respond to the narration with both unified chanting and disjointed arguing; the overall effect was described by AllMusic as one of "dramatic tension". Three female vocalists accompany Patton's narration.

The music incorporates elements of jazz and avant-garde. The orchestra's instruments frequently interrupt both each other and the female voices; some sections of the composition seem as though they are improvised. Laborintus II uses both traditional percussion instruments and electronic sounds, and their interplay serves, according to Jurek, to "erect musical and textural architectures, then disassemble them quickly". Critic Max Feldman has compared the style to that of Raymond Scott. Patton said, regarding the composition, "I can go to Berio or Luigi Nono to listen just like Ennio Morricone. But like all modern music from Italy: it is marginalised elsewhere in the world. Perhaps because of the language barrier, perhaps because it is not easy enough to classify. Berio, who was teaching in California when he wrote this piece, was listening to jazz, to pop, to folk music, and incorporated all of that into his work. Without hierarchy." (Note: Original text—"Ik kan naar Berio of Luigi Nono luisteren zoals naar Ennio Morricone. Maar zoals voor alle modernere muziek uit Italië geldt: het wordt elders in de wereld gemarginaliseerd. Misschien vanwege de taalbarrière, misschien omdat het niet eenvoudig genoeg in te delen is. Berio, die in Californië lesgaf toen hij dit stuk schreef, luisterde naar jazz, naar pop, naar volksmuziek, en incorporeerde dat allemaal in zijn werk. Zonder hiërarchie.")

Untitled
A sample of Patton's narration over the free-form orchestral composition

The first part of the composition features the three female voices creating a mournful tone while the orchestra plays recurring musical passages. The second part is a discordant crescendo as Patton's narration becomes increasingly shouted and the orchestral accompaniment more hyperactive. The third and final part returns to a calmer tone, focusing on drums and jazz woodwind instruments.

== Release and reception ==
Professional ratings
Aggregate scores
Source	Rating
Metacritic	58
Review scores
Source	Rating
AllMusic	3.5/5 stars
The A.V. Club	B−
Consequence of Sound	3/5 stars
PopMatters	7/10 stars
Spin	7/10 stars

Laborintus II was released on July 10, 2012, through Patton's record label Ipecac Recordings. In the United States, the album spent one week on the Billboard Classical Albums Chart at number 23.

The album was not well received by critics. Review aggregation website Metacritic awarded it an average score of 58 out of 100 based on eight reviews, indicating "mixed or average reviews" by their metric. For the most part, reviewers have considered the album to be challenging and difficult; some believe it to be an acquired taste after repeated listens, while others deemed it impenetrable. The A.V. Club considered the recording to be "challenging, uncompromising, and bordering on inaccessible", but credited it with "hidden payoffs" to reward repeated hearings, including "haunting" and "wraithlike" arrangements. AllMusic—while highlighting that Laborintus II was difficult to grasp at first, by virtue of being a recording of theatrical music—described the album as "a very nearly dazzling endeavor that rewards patience mightily". Consequence of Sound's Carson O'Shoney called it "unlike anything else you’ve ever heard", noting that the music may need more than one hearing to be appreciated, and that it "runs the gauntlet from quiet, jazzy atmospherics to brazen, unsettling primal noise".

A review from PopMatters stressed the "challenging" and "exhausting" nature of Berio's composition, adding that the music "constantly emphasises its own unpredictability". It compared the album to the 1970 Miles Davis free jazz album Bitches Brew. Spin magazine's review described it as being "narrated by a rock star prone to screaming", while a reviewer for Q magazine, as quoted by Metacritic, called it "both disorienting and immensely tedious". The complex nature of the piece was summarised by Magnet magazine, whose reviewer felt that it was "hard not to respect Patton's creative adventurousness, but sweet Jesus, the gulf between admiration and enjoyment of one of his projects has never been so wide".

Ictus Ensemble's performance was singled out for praise by AllMusic, who wrote about their "bracing freshness and mischievous glee". Likewise, Patton's voice frequently attracted comments by critics who variously described it as "grim, medieval, almost priestly", "alternately authoritative and declarative, reflective, romantic, priestly, and nearly apocalyptic", and "a unique tool that he can shape into whatever he needs it to be".

== Track listing ==
All lyrics are written by Edoardo Sanguineti; all music is composed by Luciano Berio.

No.	Title		Length
1.	Untitled	(Note: The three tracks are not titled on the album itself, and have variously been given as "untitled" or "Part One", "Part Two" and "Part Three" respectively.)	11:38
2.	Untitled		15:03
3.	Untitled		5:28
Total length:			32:09

== Personnel ==
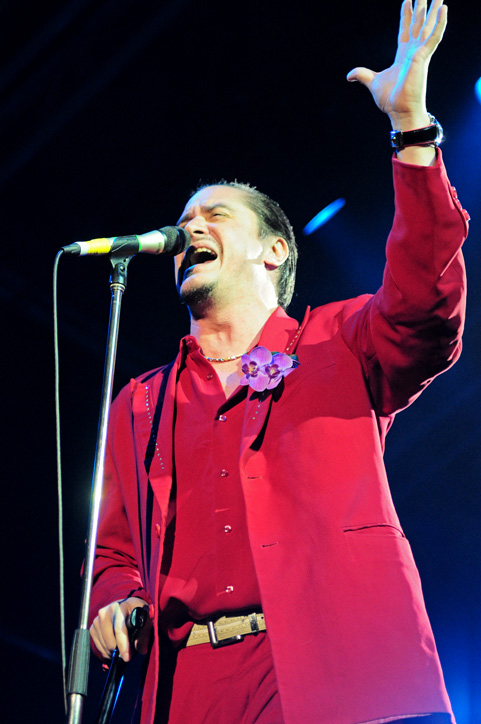
Patton (pictured) and Ictus Ensemble performed Laborintus II live in 2010.

Credits adapted from AllMusic.

- Luciano Berio – composer
- Edoardo Sanguineti – libretto
- Georges-Elie Octors – conductor
- Mike Patton – narrator
- Nederlands Kamerkoor – choir
- Annet Lans – voice
- Margriet Stok – voice
- Karin van der Poel – voice
- Klaas Stok – chorus master
- Michael Schmid – flute
- Dirk Descheemaeker – clarinet
- Carlos Galvez – clarinet
- Dries Tack – clarinet
- Samia Bousbaïne – harp
- Jutta Troch – harp
- Philippe Ranallo – trumpet
- Michaël Tambour – trumpet
- Loïc Dumoulin – trumpet
- Alain Pirre – trombone
- Michael Massot – trombone
- Nicholas Villers – trombone
- Geert De Bièvre – cello
- Françoise Deppe – cello
- Géry Cambier – double bass
- Michael Weillacher – percussion and drums
- Gerrit Nulens – percussion and drums

== Footnotes ==
=== Bibliography ===
- Rossi, Melissa; Bertels, Lieven; Plouvier, Jean-Luc (2012). Laborintus II (booklet). Mike Patton and Ictus Ensemble. Alameda, California: Ipecac Recordings. IPC-133.
