= Corpse Flower (album) =

Studio album by Mike Patton and Jean-Claude Vannier
- Released: September 13, 2019
- Genre: Art pop; lounge
- Length: 43:11
- Label: Ipecac
- Producer: Mike Patton

Mike Patton and Jean-Claude Vannier chronology
The Place Beyond the Pines (2013)	Corpse Flower (2019)

Corpse Flower is a collaborative album by American singer Mike Patton and French composer Jean-Claude Vannier, released on September 13, 2019, through Ipecac Recordings. The album consists of Patton singing a selection of Vannier's songs, with Patton backed by a band in Los Angeles and Vannier by an orchestra in Paris.

== Background ==
Patton and Vannier met in 2011 while working on a Serge Gainsbourg tribute event at the Hollywood Bowl, with Patton saying they "bonded immediately". Vannier described Patton as a "formidable vocalist" and stated that they "created a strong, beautiful and sincere collection of music, as well as a friendship".

== Critical reception ==
Professional ratings
Aggregate scores
Source	Rating
Metacritic	79/100
Review scores
Source	Rating
AllMusic	4/5 stars
Exclaim!	8/10
Loud and Quiet	8/10
Record Collector	5/5 stars

Corpse Flower received a score of 79 out of 100 on review aggregator Metacritic based on six critics' reviews, indicating "generally favorable" reception. Kerrang! called it "an album for completists", while Uncut felt that Patton "rises to the occasion throughout" and the "swooping strings and Escher-like melodic structures of "Camion" and "Yard Bull" are reassuringly familiar to Vannier enthusiasts". Alun Hamnett of Record Collector wrote, "That Mike Patton and Jean-Claude Vannier should get together to make an album was not necessarily implausible, but neither was it expected. The results are likely to delight fans of either artist. For fans of both, Corpse Flower is, quite simply, exquisite".

Thom Jurek of AllMusic stated that the "set crisscrosses many genres" and "is ultimately rooted in exploration and adventure yet grounded in sleazy chanson, lounge tropes, blues, cinema music, and sound library tropes", remarking that it is "a dark jewel from two remarkable musical iconoclasts" and "a high-water mark for both men, albeit one born from the belly of hell itself". Reviewing the album for Exclaim!, Joe Smith-Engelhardt wrote that it "dives into western-styled lounge music with a wide range of instruments and weirdness to keep listeners on their toes for each and every track" and that as "the record carries on, the intensity of the songs seemingly increases with every passing track", concluding that it contains a "dynamic sound that is interesting for anyone".

Jeremy Allen, reviewing the album for The Quietus, selected it as "Album of the Week" and wrote that "the power struggle between American and European sensibilities feels a little inevitable", although Patton "has wisely taken a step back, allowing Vannier to present ideas and arrangements and then bend them towards his will as producer". Allen also found that the "surrealism is also manifest in the title track" and the album as a whole "presents a very strong case for working together alone". Dafydd Jenkins of Loud and Quiet called it both "questionable tripe from creepy old men raging against the dying of the light" as well as "a pornographic text of premeditated, nothing-left-to-lose hideousness, openly goading the listener to hate it. To listen feels somehow masochistic, which is to say, gratifying on some deep, primal level", summarizing that it is not "the worst album of all time; it just delights in seeming that way".

== Track listing ==
All lyrics are written by Mike Patton, except where noted; all music is composed by Jean-Claude Vannier.

Corpse Flower track listing
No.	Title	Length
1.	"Ballade C.3.3." (lyrics by Oscar Wilde)	3:21
2.	"Camion"	3:23
3.	"Chansons d'amour"	4:22
4.	"Cold Sun Warm Beer"	3:40
5.	"Browning"	3:14
6.	"Hungry Ghost"	3:48
7.	"Corpse Flower"	2:53
8.	"Insolubles" (lyrics by Ariane Bomsel and Vannier)	4:08
9.	"On Top of the World"	3:20
10.	"Yard Bull"	4:21
11.	"A Schoolgirl's Day"	3:27
12.	"Pink and Bleue"	3:14
Total length:		43:11

== Charts ==
Chart performance for Corpse Flower
Chart (2019)	Peak position
Belgian Albums (Ultratop Flanders)	163
Belgian Albums (Ultratop Wallonia)	110
French Albums (SNEP)	180
German Albums (Offizielle Top 100)	99
Scottish Albums (OCC)	79
UK Independent Albums (OCC)	29
