= The Parachute Years: 1977–1980 =

Box set by John Zorn
- Released: 1997
- Recorded: June 1977–September 1981
- Genre: Avant-garde
- Length: 366:19
- Label: Tzadik; TZ 7316
- Producer: John Zorn

John Zorn chronology
Masada: Het (1997)	The Parachute Years: 1977–1980 (1997)	Euclid's Nightmare (1997)

The Parachute Years: 1977–1980 is a 7-CD box set by John Zorn. It compiles recordings of Zorn's game pieces originally released as self-produced albums on the Parachute label as well as previously unreleased performances. All of the discs in this box set have been subsequently given their own releases on Zorn's Tzadik label.

The first two discs feature Zorn's 1977 composition Lacrosse. The first disc was recorded at WKCR in June 1978 and features Mark Abbott, Polly Bradfield, Eugene Chadbourne, and LaDonna Smith and Zorn on 6 different takes of "Lacrosse". Takes 3, 4 and 6 were originally released on the Parachute Records double LP School (1978). The second disc is the original recording of "Lacrosse" which was made by Eugene Chadbourne, Henry Kaiser, Bruce Ackley, and Zorn (dubbed "Twins") in San Francisco, California in June 1977. The third disc features 17 takes (four electric and thirteen acoustic) of the composition Hockey. Five of these takes were first released on vinyl on Parachute Records in 1980, (tracks 4–9), along with Pool which features on disc four. The final three discs feature Zorn's Archery composition in previously unreleased rehearsal takes and versions released on Parachute Records in 1982.

== Critical reception ==
Professional ratings
Review scores
Source	Rating
AllMusic	4/5 stars
The Penguin Guide to Jazz Recordings	3.5/4 stars

The AllMusic review by Joslyn Layne awarded the album 4 stars stating "This box set is for dedicated fans already intrigued by the early annals of Zorn and his musical game theories. However, Zorn skeptics and listeners with less patience for theory (or history) should definitely avoid The Parachute Years. This set will not win anyone over; nor will the theories become more clear upon listening. The recordings in The Parachute Years helped the participants -- inspired and creative musicians, all -- to grow, but they also have more historical value than listening interest.".

The Penguin Guide to Jazz said "Historically this is arguably as important a set as any Blue Note or Prestige milestone... one can often hear things in this collection which echo more vividly than much of Zorn's more obvious 'outrageous' work".

In Jazziz Bruce Carnevale wrote "This is not "music" in terms of traditional rhythm, tonal centres, or anything of that sort. It's hardly even free jazz. Formed by Zorn's formal instructions or moves chosen by the player, the recordings collected here present a discontinuous world of discrete sounds. Zorn's signature jump-cut aesthetic s on display throughout the box. Here, however, a rawness takes form. This music bristles with energy that turns on and off as easily as a light switch".

== Track listing ==
- Disc one
1. "Lacrosse Take 3" – 23:06
2. "Lacrosse Take 4" – 19:06
3. "Lacrosse Take 6" – 6:20
4. "Lacrosse Take 1" – 7:01
5. "Lacrosse Take 2" – 8:08
6. "Lacrosse Take 5" – 8:16
- Disc two
1. "Lacrosse Twins Version" – 29:56
- Disc three
1. "Hockey (Electric Version): Take 1" - 1:13
2. "Hockey (Electric Version): Take 2" - 3:13
3. "Hockey (Electric Version): Take 3" - 11:32
4. "Hockey (Electric Version): Take 4" - 11:23
5. "Hockey (Acoustic Version): Take 2" - 3:43
6. "Hockey (Acoustic Version): Take 4" - 2:14
7. "Hockey (Acoustic Version): Take 11" - 0:55
8. "Hockey (Acoustic Version): Take 13" - 1:02
9. "Hockey (Acoustic Version): Take 1" - 3:10
10. "Hockey (Acoustic Version): Take 3" - 3:16
11. "Hockey (Acoustic Version): Take 5" - 1:08
12. "Hockey (Acoustic Version): Take 6" -1:00
13. "Hockey (Acoustic Version): Take 7" - 1:07
14. "Hockey (Acoustic Version): Take 8" - 0:45
15. "Hockey (Acoustic Version): Take 9" - 1:02
16. "Hockey (Acoustic Version): Take 10" - 1:07
17. "Hockey (Acoustic Version): Take 12" - 1:17
- Disc four
1. "Pool" - 50:45
- Disc five
1. "Archery Rehearsal: Pt. 1" - 32:11
2. "Archery Rehearsal: Pt. 2" - 16:14
3. "Archery Rehearsal: Pt. 3" - 28:33
- Disc six
1. "Archery: A1-D2" - 20:35
2. "Archery: D3-G1" - 20:08
- Disc seven
1. "Archery: G2-L4" - 23:52
2. "Archery: L5-O14" - 23:30

All compositions by John Zorn

== Personnel ==
- Disc One and Two
- John Zorn – alto saxophone, clarinet, soprano saxophone, liner notes
- Mark Abbott – electronics
- Bruce Ackley – soprano saxophone, liner notes
- Allen Asaf – engineer
- Polly Bradfield – violin, viola, electric violin
- Eugene Chadbourne – acoustic guitar, dobro, electric guitar, twelve string guitar, liner notes, tiple, six string bass, twelve string acoustic guitar
- Henry Kaiser – electric guitar
- LaDonna Smith – violin, viola
- Davey Williams – banjo, electric guitar, hollow body guitar

Disc One recorded at WKCR in June 1978 and Disc Two recorded in San Francisco, California in June 1977.

- Disc Three
- Polly Bradfield - Violin
- Mark E. Miller - percussion, Contact Microphones, Vibraphone
- Eugene Chadbourne - Electric guitar, Personal Effects
- Wayne Horvitz - Amplified Piano
- Bob Ostertag - Electronics
- John Zorn - Duck, Goose and Crow Calls, Clarinet, Mouthpiece

Recorded at Sorcerer Sound Studio, New York City on March 1, 1980

- Disc Four
- Polly Bradfield - Violin
- Mark E. Miller - percussion, Contact Microphones, Vibraphone
- Charles K. Noyes - percussion, Saw, Knene
- Bob Ostertag - Electronics
- John Zorn - Alto And Soprano Saxophones, Bb Clarinet, Game Calls, E-flat Clarinet

Recorded at Sorcerer Sound Studio, New York City on March 1, 1980

- Disc Five, Six and Seven
- Polly Bradfield - Violin
- Eugene Chadbourne - Guitars, Dobro
- Anthony Coleman - keyboards
- Tom Cora - Cello
- Robert Dick - Flute, Bass Flute, Piccolo, Game Calls
- Wayne Horvitz - keyboards, Harmonica, Tape, Electronics
- Bill Horvitz - Electric guitar
- Kramer - keyboards
- Bill Laswell - Electric Bass
- George Lewis - Trombone
- David Moss - drums, Voice, Water, Hammered dulcimer, cymbals, Zither, etc.
- John Zorn - Alto And Soprano Saxophones, Bb Clarinet, Game Calls, E-flat Clarinet

Recorded at the OAO Studio in Brooklyn, New York on September 12 and 13, 1981
