= Cobra: John Zorn's Game Pieces Volume 2 =

Studio album by John Zorn
- Released: March 26, 2002
- Studio: Avatar, New York City
- Genre: Avant-garde jazz
- Length: 70:44
- Label: Tzadik
- Producer: John Zorn

John Zorn chronology
Live at Tonic 2001 (2001)	Cobra: John Zorn's Game Pieces Volume 2 (2002)	Hockey (2002)

Cobra: John Zorn's Game Pieces Volume 2 is an album by John Zorn that includes his game piece, Cobra. The piece was recorded in previous versions by the labels HatHut (Cobra in 1985), Knitting Factory (Live at the Knitting Factory in 1992), and Avant (Tokyo Operations '94 in 1994) but this was the first time by Zorn's label Tzadik.

== Reception ==
The Allmusic review by Steve Loewy awarded the album four stars, stating, "Cobra is a fun-filled, mystical, blindfolded ride down a dark alley that circles back every few yards... Almost like a Talmudic tapestry, the intricate complexities are in full flower here, with constantly changing snippets, twisted sounds, swirls of ornate and not-so-ornate clusters, and shimmering beauty."

Professional ratings
Review scores
Source	Rating
Allmusic	4/5 stars

== Track listing ==
All compositions by John Zorn

1. "Pendet" – 4:49
2. "Tabana" – 10:47
3. "Uluwati" – 7:27
4. "Tamangiri" – 7:50
5. "Paras" – 6:07
6. "Sangeh" – 11:26
7. "Penganggahan" – 10:44
8. "Raksasa" – 4:44
9. "Goa Gajah" – 6:50

== Personnel ==
- John Zorn – prompter
- Josh Roseman – trombone
- Marcus Rojas – tuba
- Jennifer Choi – violin
- Mark Feldman – violin
- Erik Friedlander – cello
- Sylvie Courvoisier – piano
- Jamie Saft – keyboards
- Derek Bailey – guitar
- Trevor Dunn – bass
- Mark Dresser – bass
- Susie Ibarra – drums
- Cyro Baptista – percussion
- Annie Gosfield – sampler
- Ikue Mori – laptop computer
