= Naked City =

Naked City may refer to:

== Literature ==
- Naked City, a 1945 book of photographs by Weegee

== Entertainment ==
- The Naked City, a 1948 film noir inspired by Weegee's book
- Naked City (TV series), a television series inspired by the film, first broadcast in 1958
- Naked City: Justice with a Bullet, a 1998 crime film intended as a reboot of the TV series

== Music ==
- Naked City (band), an avant-garde group fronted by John Zorn
  - Naked City (album), a 1990 album by Zorn featuring the band
  - Naked City: The Complete Studio Recordings, a box set by the band
- Naked City, an album by Jeff Golub and Avenue Blue
- "Naked City", a song by Kiss from Unmasked

== Travel ==
- Naked City, a naturist resort now known as Sun Aura, near Roselawn, Indiana, U.S.
- Village Naturiste or "Naked City", a naturist resort in Cap d'Agde, France
- Naked City, Las Vegas, a neighborhood in Las Vegas known for crime and drugs
