= Cobra (album) =

Studio album by John Zorn
- Released: 1987
- Recorded: October 21, 1985 & May 9, 1986
- Genre: Avant-garde
- Length: 112:44
- Label: Hathut
- Producer: John Zorn

John Zorn chronology
The Big Gundown (1986)	Cobra (1987)	Spillane (1987)

2002 Reissue Cover

Cobra is a double album featuring a live and studio performance of John Zorn's improvisational game piece, Cobra recorded in 1985 and 1986 and released on the Hathut label in 1987. Subsequent recordings of the piece were released on Knitting Factory (John Zorn's Cobra: Live at the Knitting Factory (1992)), Avant (John Zorn's Cobra: Tokyo Operations '94 (1994)) and Zorn's own label Tzadik Records, (Cobra: John Zorn's Game Pieces Volume 2)) in 2002.

== Reception ==
AllMusic contains two disparate reviews of the album. The first, by Brian Olewnick, stated that "one is left with the nagging (and correct) sense of something crucial being missed. As a document in Zorn's career, Cobra is essential. As a purely musical experience, it is, quite unfortunately, less so".

The review by Steve Loewy of the 2002 CD reissue called Cobra "a masterpiece of eclecticism... all presented in Zorn's wickedly demented style, which tends toward pastiche but fascinates with its energy and variety. For Zorn enthusiasts, this is a must-have release."

Professional ratings
Review scores
Source	Rating
AllMusic	3/5 stars
AllMusic	4.5/5 stars
Spin Alternative Record Guide	9/10

== Track listing ==
- Disc one (Studio Version)

No.	Title	Length
1.	"Opening"	0:59
2.	"Allegro"	4:32
3.	"Largo"	6:13
4.	"Moderato"	7:41
5.	"Fantasia"	3:44
6.	"Presto"	1:39
7.	"Adagio Maestoso"	2:39
8.	"Violento"	4:16
9.	"Allegro Scorrevole"	2:35
10.	"Capriccio Congusto"	4:40
11.	"False Start/Giocoso"	0:52
12.	"Scherzo"	5:46
13.	"Maestoso Meccanico"	1:21
14.	"Variations/Furioso"	8:40
15.	"Epilogue"	3:43

- Disc two (Live Version)

No.	Title	Length
1.	"Prologue/Maestoso"	6:05
2.	"Capriccio"	13:23
3.	"Prestissimo"	14:03
4.	"Lento/Mysterioso"	9:29
5.	"Allegro"	10:24

All compositions by John Zorn

- Note: Disc one: 1, 9, 11, 13, 14 and Disc two: 3 are extra tracks not available on the original vinyl edition.

== Personnel ==
- Disc one (Studio Version)
- Jim Staley – trombone
- Carol Emanuel – harp
- Zeena Parkins – harp
- Bill Frisell – guitar
- Elliott Sharp – doubleneck guitar/bass, soprano, voice
- Arto Lindsay – guitar, voice
- Anthony Coleman – piano, harpsichord, celeste, Yamaha organ
- Wayne Horvitz – piano, Hammond organ, celeste, DX7
- David Weinstein – Mirage sampling keyboards, celeste
- Guy Klucevsek – accordion
- Bob James – tapes
- Christian Marclay – turntables
- Bobby Previte – percussion
- John Zorn – prompter
- Recorded at Radio City Studios, New York City on May 9, 1986
- Disc two (Live Version)
- J.A. Deane – trombone synthesizer, electronics
- Bill Frisell – guitar
- Elliott Sharp – doubleneck guitar/bass, voice
- Anthony Coleman – piano, pipe organ, Yamaha organ
- Wayne Horvitz – piano, DX7
- David Weinstein – Mirage sampling keyboards
- Guy Klucevsek – accordion
- Bob James – tapes
- Christian Marclay – turntables
- Bobby Previte – drum machine
- John Zorn – prompter
- Recorded live at Rensselaer Polytechnic Institute on October 21, 1985 by WRPI
