= Black Box (Naked City album) =

Compilation album by Naked City
- Released: 1997
- Recorded: 1989–1990, 1992
- Genre: Avant-garde jazz Free jazz Experimental rock Jazzcore; Grindcore; Avant-garde metal
- Length: 58:42
- Label: Tzadik
- Producer: John Zorn

Naked City chronology
Absinthe (1993)	Black Box (1997)	Naked City Live, Vol. 1: The Knitting Factory 1989 (2002)

Professional ratings
Review scores
Source	Rating
Allmusic	4/5 stars

Black Box is a compilation album by John Zorn's band Naked City featuring Yamatsuka Eye on vocals. The album is a collection of the "hardcore miniatures" from Naked City and Grand Guignol that were originally released on Torture Garden in 1990 and the extended piece Leng Tch'e which was only released in Japan in 1992. This compilation was released on Tzadik Records in 1996.

== Track listing ==
Disc One:

1. "Blood is Thin" – 1:00
2. "Demon Sanctuary" – 0:38
3. "Thrash Jazz Assassin" – 0:45
4. "Dead Spot" – 0:31
5. "Bonehead" – 0:51
6. "Speedball" – 0:37
7. "Blood Duster" – 0:13
8. "Pile Driver" – 0:33
9. "Shangkuan Ling-Feng" – 1:14
10. "Numbskull" – 0:29
11. "Perfume Of A Critic's Burning Flesh" – 0:24
12. "Jazz Snob Eat Shit" – 0:24
13. "The Prestidigitator" – 0:43
14. "No Reason To Believe" – 0:26
15. "Hellraiser" – 0:39
16. "Torture Garden" – 0:35
17. "Slan" – 0:23
18. "Hammerhead" – 0:08
19. "The Ways Of Pain" – 0:31
20. "The Noose" – 0:10
21. "Sack Of Shit" – 0:43
22. "Blunt Instrument" – 0:53
23. "Osaka Bondage" – 1:14
24. "Igneous Ejaculation" – 0:20
25. "Shallow Grave" – 0:40
26. "Ujaku" – 0:27
27. "Kaoru" – 0:50
28. "Dead Dread" – 0:45
29. "Billy Liar" – 0:10
30. "Victims Of Torture" – 0:22
31. "Speedfreaks" – 0:29
32. "New Jersey Scum Swamp" – 0:41
33. "S & M Sniper" – 0:14
34. "Pigfucker" – 0:23
35. "Cairo Chop Shop" – 0:22
36. "Fuck The Facts" – 0:11
37. "Obeah Man" – 0:17
38. "Facelifter" – 0:34
39. "N.Y. Flat Top Box" – 0:43
40. "Whiplash" – 0:19
41. "The Blade" – 0:36
42. "Gob Of Spit" – 0:18

Disc Two:

1. "Leng Tch'e" – 31:39

All compositions by Naked City

- Recorded in Brooklyn, New York City, and Tokyo 1989–1990 except for 'Leng Tch'e' Recorded on January 11, 1992

== Personnel ==
- Joey Baron – drums
- Yamatsuka Eye – vocals
- Bill Frisell – guitar
- Fred Frith – bass
- Wayne Horvitz – keyboards
- John Zorn – alto saxophone, vocals, producer, executive producer
- Martin Bisi – engineer
- Anthony Lee – design
- Bob Ludwig – mastering
- Macioce – rephotography
- Roger Moutenot – engineer, mixing
- David Newgarden – associate producer
- Seigen Ono – engineer
- Maruo Suehiro – illustrations
- Kazunori Sugiyama – associate producer
- Kimsu Theiler – cover design
- Arai Yasunori – cover design
