= John Zorn's Cobra: Tokyo Operations '94 =

Live album by John Zorn
- Released: 1994
- Recorded: November 25, 1994
- Genre: Avant-garde
- Length: 50:35
- Label: Avant Avan 049
- Producer: Makigami Koichi

John Zorn chronology
| Harras (1995) | John Zorn's Cobra: Tokyo Operations '94 (1994) | Filmworks III: 1990–1995 (1995) |

John Zorn's Cobra: Tokyo Operations '94 is a live performance of John Zorn's improvisational game piece Cobra, recorded in Tokyo in 1994 featuring Japanese musicians and instruments. The piece had been released in two previous versions on Hathut (Cobra in 1985) and the Knitting Factory (John Zorn's Cobra: Live at the Knitting Factory in 1992) and was subsequently released on Zorn's own label Tzadik Records in 2002.

== Reception ==
The Allmusic review by Stephen Thomas Erlewine awarded the album 4 stars, stating that "it's the traditional Japanese instruments that make this a version of Cobra to remember."

Professional ratings
Review scores
| Source | Rating |
|---|---|
| Allmusic | 4/5 stars |

== Track listing ==
All compositions by John Zorn

1. "Sensyo" – 6:07
2. "Tomobiki" – 9:27
3. "Senbu" – 8:08
4. "Butsumetsu" – 8:54
5. "Taian" – 8:05
6. "Shakko" – 9:54

- Recorded at Shibuya La Mama in Tokyo, Japan, on November 25, 1994

== Personnel ==
- Isso Yukihiro – nokan, dengakubue
- Uemura Masahiro – percussion
- Uchihashi Kazuhisa – guitar
- Kinoshita Shinichi – shamisen
- Senba Kiyohiko – percussion
- Takei Makoto – shakuhachi
- Tanaka Yumiko – gidayu
- Nakamura Hitomi – hichiriki
- Maruta Miki – koto
- Mekken – bass
- Yamamoto Kyoko – vocal
- Ito Taeko – ortin doo
- Makigami Koichi – prompter
