= John Zorn's Cobra: Live at the Knitting Factory =

Live album by John Zorn
- Released: 1995
- Recorded: 1992
- Genre: Avant-garde Improvised music
- Length: 60:50
- Label: Knitting Factory KFW 124
- Producer: Anthony Coleman; Norman Yamada

John Zorn chronology
Masada: Dalet (1995)	John Zorn's Cobra: Live at the Knitting Factory (1995)	Zohar (1995)

John Zorn's Cobra: Live at the Knitting Factory is an album of a performance of John Zorn's improvisational game piece, Cobra, performed at the Knitting Factory in 1992. The album resembles the missing link between John Zorn's work with Masada and Naked City. It also had a major impact on the electronic scene of New York.

== Reception ==
Professional ratings
Review scores
Source	Rating
Allmusic	1.5/5 stars
Guy's Music Review	2/10 stars

The Allmusic review by Scott Yanow awarded the album 1½ stars stating "There are some colorful segments, but in general, these self-indulgent performances would be much more interesting to see in person than to hear on record. Taken purely as a listening experience, one is surprised that this material has even been released." Guy Peters stated "If this is your first acquaintance with Zorn’s multifaceted universe, chances are you’ll never visit it again and therefore it only can serve as a treat for those who were there, seriously dedicated fans."

== Track listing ==
All compositions by John Zorn

1. "Hemachatus Haemachatus" – 2:11
2. "Naja Naja Atra" (Organized by David Shea) – 8:43
3. "Many-Banded Krait" – 10:53
4. "Taipan" – 1:30
5. "D. Popylepis" – 3:20
6. "Lampropeltis Doliata Syspila" (Organized by Joe Gallant) – 2:19
7. "Boomslang" – 11:07
8. "Maticora Intestinalis" – 6:13
9. "Acanthopis Antarcticus" – 4:00
10. "Hydrophiidae" – 5:42
11. "Ngu Sam Liem" – 0:53
12. "Ophiophagus Hannah" – 1:25
13. "Boulengerina" – 5:23
14. "Laticaudia Laticaudia" (Organized by Steven Bernstein) – 3:03

Note: All songs are named after subspecies of Cobra snakes

- All tracks recorded live at the Knitting Factory, New York City
- Track 1 – recorded in January 1992
- Track 2 – recorded in February 1992
- Track 3 – recorded in March 1992
- Tracks 4 & 5 – recorded in April 1992
- Track 6 – recorded in May 1992
- Track 7 – recorded in June 1992
- Track 8 – recorded in July 1992
- Track 9 – recorded in August 1992
- Track 10 – recorded in September 1992
- Tracks 11 & 12 – recorded in October 1992
- Track 13 – recorded in November 1992
- Track 14 – recorded in December 1992

=== Performers ===
- Christine Bard (1,3,7) – drums
- Anthony Coleman (1,2,3,7,9) – sampler
- Mark Degliantoni (1,2,3,9) – sampler
- Curtis Fowlkes (1,3) – trombone
- Evan Gallagher (1,2,6,8,10) – keyboards, sampler, trombone, cornet
- Gisburg (1,4,5,7) – voice (soprano), mouth organ, tin whistle
- Roy Nathanson (1,3,7,9) – soprano, alto, tenor
- James Pugliese (1,2,7,9) – drums, sampler, percussion
- Marcus Rojas (1,13) – tuba
- David Shea (1,2,9) – sampler
- Doug Wieselman (1) – clarinet
- Michelle Kinney (2,13) – cello, electronics
- Tim Spelios (2) – CD players
- David Weinstein (2) – sampler
- Brad Jones (3) – string bass
- Myra Melford (3) – synthesizer
- Zeena Parkins (3,7) – electric harp
- Marc Ribot (3,7) – electric guitar
- Jay Rodrigues (3) – alto
- E.J. Rodriguez (3,14) – drums, percussion
- Bill Ware (3) – vibraphone
- Jeff Buckley (4,5) – voice (tenor)
- M. Doughty (4,5) – voice (tenor)
- Judy Dunaway (4,5,8) – voice (mezzo-soprano), electric guitar, balloons
- Mark Ettinger (4,5) – voice (tenor)
- Cassie Hoffman (4,5) – voice (soprano)
- Nina Mankin (4,5) – voice (mezzo-soprano)
- Chris Nelson (4,5) – voice (baritone)
- Juliet Palmer (4,5) – voice (alto)
- Wilbur Pauley (4,5) – voice (bass)
- Rick Porterfield (4,5) – voice (baritone)
- Eric Qin (4,5) – voice (baritone)
- Kevin Sharp (4,5) – voice (throat)
- Louie Belogenis (6) – drums
- Steven Bernstein (6,10,13,14) – sampler, trumpet, slide trumpet
- Dawn Buckholz (6) – sampler
- Joe Gallant (6,10) – string bass, 6-string contrabass guitar
- Randy Hutton (6) – synthesizer
- Margaret Lancaster (6) – soprano, alto
- Fred Lonberg-Holm (6,8,11,12) – electric harp, tape recorder, CD players, noisemakers, cornet
- Vito Ricci (6) – electric guitar
- Walter Thompson (6,10) – alto, baritone, flute
- Ed Broms (7) – string bass
- Tamela Glenn (7) – voice (soprano)
- Lee Hyla (7) – sampler
- Tim Smith (7) – bass clarinet
- Chris Wood (7,9) – string bass
- Bob Lipman (8) – electric guitar, bongos, percussion
- Leslie Ross (8,11,12) – bassoon, electric bassoon, shawm, various reeds
- Blaise Siwula (8) – alto, trumpet
- Kiku Wada (8) – electric guitar
- David Watson (8,11,12) – electric guitar, trumpet
- Steve Waxman (8) – electric bass, pocket trumpet, percussion
- Michael Evans (9,10) – drums, percussion
- Craig Flanagin (9) – electric guitar
- K.J. Grant (9,11,12) – electric bass, voice (alto)
- John King (9) – dobro
- Sharon Topper (9) – voice (soprano), noisemakers
- John Zorn (9) – alto
- David Cast Castigilione (10,14) – tenor, bass clarinet, baritone saxophone
- Allan Chase (10) – soprano, alto
- Hollis Headrick (10) – drums
- Rolf Sturm (10) – electric guitar
- Steve Swell (10) – trombone
- Thomas Ulrich (10) – cello
- Nick Balaban (11,12) – synthesizers
- April Chung (11,12) – violin
- Paul Hoskin (11,12) – baritone
- Donna Jewell (11,12) – voice (soprano)
- James Lo (11,12) – drums
- Makigami Koichi (11,12) – voice (tenor)
- Matthew Ostrowski (11,12) – analog synthesizer
- Greg Anderson (13) – acoustic, string instruments
- David Krakauer (13) – clarinet, bass clarinet
- Frank London (13) – trumpet, percussion
- Paul Morrissett (13) – kaval, gaida, violin
- Andrea Parkins (13) – accordion
- Sebastian Steinberg (13) – electric bass
- Alicia Svigals (13) – violin
- Jane Tomkiewicz (13) – percussion
- Billy Martin (14) – percussion, talking drum
- Ben Perowsky (14) – drums
- Adam Rogers (14) – electric guitar
- Dan Rosengard (14) – synthesizers
- Danny Sedownik (14) – percussion
- Paul Shapiro (14) – soprano, tenor, flute
- David Tronzo (14) – slide guitar
