= Leng Tche =

Leng Tche can refer to:

- Slow slicing, a form of torture
- Leng Tch'e, a Belgian grindcore band
- Leng Tch'e (album), an album by Naked City
- Lingzhi mushroom, a Chinese medicinal mushroom
