= Cobra (Zorn) =

Musical composition by John Zorn

Cobra is an unpublished but recorded and frequently performed musical composition by John Zorn. Cobra was conceived as a system with very detailed rules but with no pre-conceived sequence of events (a "game piece") for a group of musical improvisors and a prompter. Zorn completed Cobra on October 9, 1984. The composition consists of a set of cues notated on cards, and rules corresponding to the cues that direct the players what to do in response to the cards. The number of players, instrumentation, and length of the piece is indeterminate, but a "prompter" is essential to the piece, holding the cards at his or her discretion and issuing other cues. Because there is no traditional musical notation and the players improvise, the piece may sound radically different from performance to performance. The title was inspired by a table-top war game published by TSR.

As was commented upon in some length in a 2004 interview, Zorn has, with his own words, "deliberately chosen not to publish (or even write down) the rules" to his game pieces, being concerned with the importance of personal instruction. Despite this, photocopies circulate among musicians internationally, and there is even a clean printing of all the cue categories in a CD booklet (see recordings). A card marked "XP", for example, orders the musicians to "sub crossfade" (i.e., those who are playing must stop, while those who were not playing must begin). Other cards can order players to form sub-groupings, to mimic or elaborate on what another musician was improvising, and so forth. Players can make requests of the prompter via hand gestures or wearing headgear, including forming "guerrilla units" that are temporarily allowed to ignore the prompter and have options unavailable to other musicians (e.g., forming an "Ivesiean Trio" that plays in recognizable genres that overlap and contrast in the style of composer Charles Ives). The BBC documentary series On the Edge: Improvisation in Music (1992) includes a short segment of Zorn explaining and conducting two versions of Cobra. His goal with Cobra, Zorn said, was to "harness" the creative developments in improvisation and extended techniques by New York City's downtown scene musicians in a semi-structured way, but "without hindering" their performances; he was interested in telling the musicians when to play, and with whom, but without telling them what to play. Plus-Minus (1963, 1974) by German composer Karlheinz Stockhausen was a key inspiration for Zorn, inspiring him to develop methods play with or against each other and in response to his cues but without dictating specific notes, sounds, or other formal structures. Though Cobra can be performed by any number of musicians plus a prompter who handles the cards, Zorn has stated that at least ten musicians are ideal, with care taken in selecting the musicians based on their improvisational skills and personalities.

Cobra was first performed at the original TriBeCa location of Roulette Intermedium in 1984.

== Recordings ==
- Radio City Studios, NYC (1986) and WRPI (1985), released as a double CD entitled "John Zorn - Cobra" on the Hatology Label of Basel, Switzerland (2nd ed, 2002)
- Cobra (1987)- includes a large table of the cues in color.
- John Zorn's Cobra: Live at the Knitting Factory (1992)
- John Zorn's Cobra: Tokyo Operations '94 (1994)
- Cobra: John Zorn's Game Pieces Volume 2 (2002) — includes a copy of the cues
