= Radio (Naked City album) =

Studio album by Naked City
- Released: 1993
- Recorded: April 1992
- Genre: Experimental; jazzcore; avant-garde
- Length: 57:50
- Label: Avant Avan 003
- Producer: John Zorn

Naked City chronology
Leng Tch'e (1992)	Radio (1993)	Absinthe (1993)

John Zorn chronology
Rituals: Live in Japan (1993)	Radio (1993)	Absinthe (1993)

Radio is the fourth studio album by the band Naked City, and their first to be composed entirely by bandleader John Zorn. The album was also released as part of Naked City: The Complete Studio Recordings on Tzadik Records in 2005.

Radio marked a return to the eclectic, "jump cut" style of the band's 1989 debut album, making drastic shifts from one musical style to another often every few seconds. The liner notes cite a wide range of musical influences, including Frank Sinatra, Igor Stravinsky, Led Zeppelin, Bernard Herrmann, Santana, and Quincy Jones, in addition to Zorn's previously identified touchstones.

== Reception ==
In his 4 star review for the Allmusic website, Maurice Rickard states "Several genres and bands are skillfully evoked... and helpfully listed in the liner notes in order of occurrence. Jazz, surf, R&B, death metal, funk, acid rock, and serialism are grafted together in this collection, often into the same song, and the band shifts genres, tempos, and arrangements on a dime. Supposedly, Radio was conceived as a set for a college radio program, making it a kind of "Young Person's Guide to Naked City," beginning with accessible tunes, gradually building up listener tolerance to dissonance, and finally sandbagging the listener with evil blasts of dissonant metallic noise and convincing perpetrator-and-victim screaming."

Professional ratings
Review scores
Source	Rating
Allmusic	4/5 stars

== Track listing ==
All music composed and arranged by John Zorn.

No.	Title	Length
1.	"Asylum"	1:56
2.	"Sunset Surfer"	3:23
3.	"Party Girl"	2:33
4.	"The Outsider"	2:28
5.	"Triggerfingers"	3:31
6.	"Terkmani Teepee"	3:57
7.	"Sex Fiend"	3:31
8.	"Razorwire"	5:28
9.	"The Bitter and the Sweet"	4:48
10.	"Krazy Kat"	1:51
11.	"The Vault"	4:44
12.	"Metaltov"	2:07
13.	"Poisonhead"	1:10
14.	"Bone Orchard"	3:59
15.	"I Die Screaming"	2:20
16.	"Pistol Whipping"	0:57
17.	"Skatekey"	1:25
18.	"Shock Corridor"	1:05
19.	"American Psycho"	6:09

== Personnel ==
- John Zorn – alto saxophone
- Bill Frisell – guitar
- Wayne Horvitz – keyboards
- Fred Frith – bass
- Joey Baron – drums
- Yamatsuka Eye – vocals

== Credits ==
- Published by Theatre of Musical Optics, BMI
- Executive Producer: Disk Union
- Associate Producer: Kazunori Sugiyama
- Recorded April 1992 by Alec Head
- Mixed September 1992 by Roger Moutenot
- Assistant Engineer: Hoover Le
- Mastered by Bob Ludwig
- Digital Editing by Scott Hull
- Cover photos: Man Ray
- Design: Tomoyo T.L. (Karath=Razar)
