= Archery (album) =

Studio album by John Zorn
- Released: 1982
- Recorded: September 12–13, 1981
- Studio: OAO Studio, Brooklyn, New York
- Genre: Avant-garde
- Length: 165:11
- Label: Parachute
- Producer: John Zorn

John Zorn chronology
Pool (1980)	Archery (1982)	Locus Solus (1983)

Tzadik Edition

Archery is an album by John Zorn featuring his early "game piece" composition of the same name. The album was released by Parachute Records in 1982.

== Reception ==
The AllMusic review by Thom Jurek gave the album four stars, stating: "The package, as with all Tzadik releases, is stellar, full of three inserts, production notes, and a replica of the original score. If you allow it to, it will change the way you listen to music—and maybe watch TV, too."

Professional ratings
Review scores
Source	Rating
AllMusic	4/5 stars
The Encyclopedia of Popular Music	3/5 stars
Spin Alternative Record Guide	8/10

== Track listing ==
All tracks are written by John Zorn.

No.	Title	Length
1.	"Archery Rehearsal: Pt. 1"	32:11
2.	"Archery Rehearsal: Pt. 2"	16:14
3.	"Archery Rehearsal: Pt. 3"	28:33
4.	"A1-D2"	20:35
5.	"D3-G1"	20:08
6.	"G2-L4"	23:52
7.	"L5-O14"	23:30

== Personnel ==
- John Zorn – alto and soprano saxophone, B♭ clarinet, game calls, E♭ clarinet
- Robert Dick – flute, bass flute, piccolo, game calls
- George Lewis – trombone
- Anthony Coleman – keyboards
- Wayne Horvitz – keyboards, harmonica, tape, electronics
- Mark Kramer – keyboards
- Eugene Chadbourne – guitar, Dobro
- Bill Horvitz – guitar
- Bill Laswell – bass guitar
- Polly Bradfield – violin
- Tom Cora – cello
- David Moss – drums, voice, hammered dulcimer, zither
