= Through Acceptance of the Mystery Peace =

Studio album by William Parker
- Released: 1980
- Recorded: 1974–1979
- Genre: Free jazz
- Label: Centering Records; 1001; Eremite Records; MTE012
- Producer: William Parker (original producer); Michael Ehlers (reissue producer)

William Parker chronology
Through Acceptance of the Mystery Peace (1980)	Flowers Grow in My Room (1994)

Through Acceptance of the Mystery Peace is an album by bassist William Parker, his debut as a leader. It was recorded during 1974–1979, and was initially released on LP in limited quantities by Parker's Centering label in 1980. In 1998, the album was reissued on CD by Eremite Records in expanded form. The recording features Parker in ensembles of varying size.

According to Parker's liner notes accompanying the 1998 reissue, the album title is from a line of poetry by Kenneth Patchen: "through acceptance of the mystery peace & only through peace can come acceptance of the mystery." The composition of the same name is dedicated to and inspired by Patchen. "Desert Flower" is for "those human beings who flower within the desert, whether that desert is the Sahara, or the streets of Watts or Capetown." "Rattles and Bells and the Light of the Sun" is dedicated to John Coltrane. "Commitment" is "a prayer that echoes the words 'thank you God for the gift of life'," while "Face Still Hands Folded" was written for Parker's father, and is part of a ballet titled "Dawn Voice."

== Reception ==
Professional ratings
Review scores
Source	Rating
AllMusic	4/5 stars
The Penguin Guide to Jazz	3/4 stars
Tom Hull – on the Web	B+

In a review for AllMusic, Steve Loewy wrote: "The sound quality is slightly subpar, but the raw, 1960s feel of this album should appeal to those who appreciate the unassuming brilliance of this giant of the string bass... there is plenty here to satisfy those who enjoy the bassist's style of new music."

The authors of the Penguin Guide to Jazz Recordings stated: "The smaller groups favour strings and could almost be playing classical pieces. The bigger ensembles, though, are the surest indication of what was to come."

Tom Hull awarded the album a grade of "B+", and commented: "These five early pieces... make for a good introduction to where Parker comes from and how he got his shit together."

Jon Dale, writing for Fact, called the recording "an assured, brilliantly articulated album," and noted "the sheer heft of the musicians that appear on it."

== Track listings ==
All compositions by William Parker.

=== 1980 LP release ===
Track timings not provided.

1. "Desert Flower"
2. "Rattles and Bells and the Light of the Sun"
3. "Commitment"
4. "Face Still Hands Folded"

=== 1998 CD reissue ===
1. "Desert Flower" – 19:42
2. "Through Acceptance of the Mystery Peace" – 9:43
3. "Rattles and Bells and the Light of the Sun" – 12:12
4. "Commitment" – 18:36
5. "Face Still Hands Folded" – 8:03

"Desert Flower" and "Through Acceptance of the Mystery Peace" were recorded on January 21, 1979. "Rattles and Bells and the Light of the Sun" was recorded in February 1974. "Commitment" was recorded in August 1977. "Face Still Hands Folded" was recorded on October 24, 1976.

== Personnel ==
"Desert Flower"

- William Connell, Jr – alto saxophone
- Daniel Carter – alto saxophone, tenor saxophone, flute, trumpet
- Rozanne Levine – clarinet
- Peter Kuhn – bass clarinet
- Arthur Williams – trumpet
- Toshinori Kondo – alto horn
- William Parker – bass
- Denis Charles – drums

"Through Acceptance of the Mystery Peace"

- William Connell, Jr – flute
- Jason Kao Hwang – violin
- Polly Bradfield – violin
- Tristan Honsinger – cello

"Rattles and Bells and the Light of the Sun"

- Jemeel Moondoc – alto saxophone
- Charles Brackeen – tenor saxophone
- Henry Warner – clarinet
- Arthur Williams – trumpet
- Billy Bang – violin
- William Parker – bass
- Roger Baird – percussion

"Commitment"

- John Hagen – tenor saxophone
- Arthur Williams – trumpet
- William Parker – bass

"Face Still Hands Folded"

- William Parker – recitation
- Ramsey Ameen – violin
- Billy Bang – violin
