= Hockey (album) =

Studio album by John Zorn
- Released: 1980, 1997 & 2002
- Recorded: March 1, 1980
- Studio: Sorcerer Sound Studio, New York City
- Genre: Avant-garde
- Length: 50:03
- Label: Tzadik TZ 7316
- Producer: John Zorn

John Zorn chronology
Cobra: John Zorn's Game Pieces Volume 2 (2002)	Hockey (1980)	First Live 1993 (2002)

Hockey is an album by John Zorn featuring his early "game piece" composition of the same name which first appeared on the Parachute Records edition of Pool in 1980. The full recordings of the piece were first released on CD on Tzadik Records as part of The Parachute Years Box Set in 1997 and as a single CD in 2002.

== Reception ==
The Allmusic review by François Couture awarded the album 2½ stars stating "Hockey belongs to John Zorn's early works. The piece dates from 1978 and is shorter (in principle) than Lacrosse or Pool, also from the same period... The inner workings of the piece are left to the listener's imagination, but the composer suggests a likeness to entertainer Jack Benny (and to a lesser extent Buster Keaton)."

Professional ratings
Review scores
Source	Rating
Allmusic	2.5/5 stars

== Track listing ==
1. "Hockey (Electric Version): Take 1" – 1.13
2. "Hockey (Electric Version): Take 2" – 3.13
3. "Hockey (Electric Version): Take 3" – 11.32
4. "Hockey (Electric Version): Take 4" – 11.23 originally released on Pool
5. "Hockey (Acoustic Version): Take 2" – 3.43 originally released on Pool
6. "Hockey (Acoustic Version): Take 4" – 2.14 originally released on Pool
7. "Hockey (Acoustic Version): Take 11" – 0.55 originally released on Pool
8. "Hockey (Acoustic Version): Take 13" – 1.02 originally released on Pool
9. "Hockey (Acoustic Version): Take 1" – 3.10 originally released on Pool
10. "Hockey (Acoustic Version): Take 3" – 3.16
11. "Hockey (Acoustic Version): Take 5" – 1.08
12. "Hockey (Acoustic Version): Take 6" –1.00
13. "Hockey (Acoustic Version): Take 7" – 1.07
14. "Hockey (Acoustic Version): Take 8" – 0.45
15. "Hockey (Acoustic Version): Take 9" – 1.02
16. "Hockey (Acoustic Version): Take 10" – 1.07
17. "Hockey (Acoustic Version): Take 12" – 1.17

All compositions by John Zorn
- Recorded at Sorcerer Sound, New York on March 1, 1980

== Personnel ==
- Polly Bradfield – violin
- Mark E. Miller – percussion, contact microphones, vibraphone
- Eugene Chadbourne – electric guitar, personal effects
- Wayne Horvitz – amplified piano
- Bob Ostertag – electronics
- John Zorn – duck, goose and crow calls, clarinet, mouthpiece
