= Naked City: The Complete Studio Recordings =

Compilation album by Naked City
- Released: 2005
- Recorded: 1989–1993
- Length: 327:37
- Label: Tzadik TZ 7344-5
- Producer: John Zorn

Naked City chronology
Naked City Live, Vol. 1: The Knitting Factory 1989 (2002)	Naked City: The Complete Studio Recordings (2005)

John Zorn chronology
Filmworks XV: Protocols of Zion (2005)	Naked City: The Complete Studio Recordings (2005)	Sanhedrin 1994–1997 (2005)

Naked City: The Complete Studio Recordings is a five disc box set that contains all of the studio albums released by Naked City during their five-year history.

The five discs are accompanied by a book, Eight Million Stories: Naked City Ephemera, which contains a wealth of photos and art as well as testimonials from all five band members and numerous acquaintances, friends, fans and contributors such as Mike Patton, Yamatsuka Eye, Sean Lennon, Mick Harris and Eyvind Kang.

== Reception ==
Professional ratings
Review scores
Source	Rating
Allmusic	4/5 stars
All About Jazz	favorable

The Allmusic listing awarded the compilation 4 stars. Writing for Pitchfork Media, Chris Dalen stated "Naked City will always be Zorn's "coolest" project, the best vehicle for his early ideas, and one of the most intriguing ensembles its members ever joined. And now, Zorn can inter it in a single box and once again set it aside." All About Jazz correspondent, Mark Corroto, labelled it "Probably as dangerous a music as has ever been produced."

== Track listing ==
All tracks by John Zorn, except where noted.

=== Disc One (Naked City) ===
1. "Batman" – 2:04
2. "The Sicilian Clan" (Ennio Morricone) – 3:32
3. "You Will Be Shot" – 1:31
4. "Latin Quarter" – 4:11
5. "A Shot in the Dark" (Henry Mancini) – 3:13
6. "Reanimator" – 1:43
7. "Snagglepuss" – 2:20
8. "I Want to Live" (Johnny Mandel) – 2:12
9. "Lonely Woman" (Ornette Coleman) – 2:45
10. "Igneous Ejaculation" – 0:24
11. "Blood Duster" – 0:16
12. "Hammerhead" – 0:11
13. "Demon Sanctuary" – 0:41
14. "Obeah Man" – 0:20
15. "Ujaku" – 0:30
16. "Fuck the Facts" – 0:14
17. "Speedball" – 0:43
18. "Chinatown" (Jerry Goldsmith) – 4:28
19. "Punk China Doll" – 3:04
20. "N.Y. Flat Top Box" – 0:45
21. "Saigon Pickup" – 4:50
22. "The James Bond Theme" (John Barry) – 3:06
23. "Den of Sins" – 1:15
24. "Contempt" (Georges Delerue) – 2:54
25. "Graveyard Shift" – 3:32
26. "Inside Straight" – 4:16

=== Disc Two (Grand Guignol) ===
1. "Grand Guignol" – 17:49
2. "Blood Is Thin" – 1:03
3. "Thrash Jazz Assassin" – 0:48
4. "Dead Spot" – 0:35
5. "Bonehead" – 0:56
6. "Piledriver" – 0:37
7. "Shangkuan Ling-Feng" – 1:18
8. "Numbskull" – 0:32
9. "Perfume of a Critic's Burning Flesh" – 0:28
10. "Jazz Snob Eat Shit" – 0:27
11. "The Prestidigitator" – 0:47
12. "No Reason to Believe" – 0:27
13. "Hellraiser" – 0:42
14. "Torture Garden" – 0:39
15. "Slan" – 0:26
16. "The Ways of Pain" – 0:35
17. "The Noose" – 0:12
18. "Sack of Shit" – 0:48
19. "Blunt Instrument" – 0:56
20. "Osaka Bondage" – 1:16
21. "Shallow Grave" – 0:43
22. "Kaoru" – 0:54
23. "Dead Dread" – 0:49
24. "Billy Liar" – 0:15
25. "Victims of Torture" – 0:26
26. "Speedfreaks" – 0:51
27. "New Jersey Scum Swamp" – 0:44
28. "S&M Sniper" – 0:16
29. "Pig Fucker" – 0:27
30. "Cairo Chop Shop" – 0:24
31. "Facelifter" – 0:57
32. "Whiplash" – 0:23
33. "The Blade" – 0:43
34. "Gob of Spit" – 0:28
35. "La Cathedrale Engloutie" – 6:24 (Claude Debussy)
36. "Three Preludes Op. 74: Douloureux, Déchirant" – 1:17 (Alexander Scriabin)
37. "Three Preludes Op. 74: Très Lent, Contemplatif" – 1:43 (Scriabin)
38. "Three Preludes Op. 74: Allegro Drammatico" – 0:49 (Scriabin)
39. "Prophetiae Sybillarum" – 1:46 (Orlande de Lassus)
40. "The Cage" – 2:01 (Charles Ives)
  - Vocals by Bob Dorough
41. "Louange à L'Éternité de Jésus" – 7:08 (Olivier Messiaen)
42. "Grand Guignol (Version Vocale)" – 17:40
  - Vocals by Mike Patton

=== Disc Three (Heretic) ===
All tracks by Naked City.

1. "Main Titles" – 1:28
2. "Sex Games" – 2:23
3. "The Brood" – 2:49
4. "Sweat, Sperm + Blood" – 2:04
5. "Vliet" – 0:50
6. "Heretic 1" – 2:33
7. "Submission" – 4:23
8. "Heretic 2" – 1:46
9. "Catacombs" – 2:46
10. "Heretic 3" – 2:43
11. "My Master, My Slave" – 2:23
12. "Saint Jude" – 2:13
13. "The Conqueror Worm" – 2:32
14. "Dominatrix 2B" – 2:15
15. "Back Through the Looking Glass" – 2:40
16. "Here Come the 7,000 Frogs" – 1:59
17. "Slaughterhouse/Chase Sequence" – 2:19
18. "Castle Keep" – 1:49
19. "Mantra of Resurrected Shit" – 1:43
20. "Trypsicore" – 1:47
21. "Fire and Ice (Club Scene)" – 2:37
22. "Crosstalk" – 1:41
23. "Copraphagist Rituals" – 0:53
24. "Labyrinth" – 5:49

=== Disc Four (Radio) ===
1. "Asylum" – 1:55
2. "Sunset Surfer" – 3:24
3. "Party Girl" – 2:33
4. "The Outsider" – 2:28
5. "Triggerfingers" – 3:31
6. "Terkmani Teepee" – 3:59
7. "Sex Fiend" – 3:32
8. "Razorwire" – 5:31
9. "The Bitter and the Sweet" – 4:52
10. "Krazy Kat" – 1:54
11. "The Vault" – 4:44
12. "Metal Tov" – 2:07
13. "Poisonhead" – 1:09
14. "Bone Orchard" – 3:54
15. "I Die Screaming" – 2:29
16. "Pistol Whipping" – 0:57
17. "Skatekey" – 1:24
18. "Shock Corridor" – 1:08
19. "American Psycho" – 6:09

=== Disc Five (Absinthe & Leng Tch'e) ===
1. "Val de Travers" – 6:19
2. "Une Correspondance" – 5:09
3. "La Feé Verte" – 5:12
4. "Fleurs du Mal" – 4:08
5. "Artemisia Absinthium" – 4:34
6. "Notre Dame de l'Oubli" (for Olivier Messiaen) – 4:51
7. "Verlaine Part One: Un Midi Moins Dix" – 4:28
8. "Verlaine Part Two: La Bleue" – 6:03
9. "...Rend Fou" – 6:16
10. "Leng Tch'e" – 31:38

== Personnel ==
=== Performance ===
- Joey Baron – drums
- Bob Dorough – vocals
- Yamataka Eye – vocals
- John Zorn – alto saxophone, vocals, arrangements
- Bill Frisell – guitar
- Fred Frith – bass
- Wayne Horvitz – keyboards
- Mike Patton – vocals

=== Production ===
- Scott Ansell – engineer
- Jason Baker – engineer
- Scott Bellmer – mastering
- Martin Bisi – engineer
- Oliver Di Cicco – engineer
- Alec Head – engineer
- Scott Hull – digital editing, mastering
- Bob Hurwitz – executive producer
- Hoover Le – assistant engineer
- Bob Ludwig – mastering
- Man Ray – cover photo
- Roger Moutenot – engineer, mixing
- Seigen Ono – engineer
- Mike Patton – author
- Maruo Suehiro – illustrations
- Kazunori Sugiyama – associate producer
- Tanaka Tomoyo – design
- Lisa Wells – typesetting
- Takahashi Yukihiro – photo typesetting
- John Zorn – production, liner notes
