= Judy Dunaway =

American classical composer

- Born: 1964 (age 61–62); Mississippi
- Occupation: Sound artist
- Known for: Sound works for latex balloons

Judy Dunaway (born 1964, in Mississippi) is a conceptual sound artist, avant-garde composer, free improvisor and creator of sound installations who is primarily known for her sound works for latex balloons. Since 1990 she has created over thirty works for balloons as sound conduits and has also made this her main instrument for improvisation.

== Background ==
Judy Dunaway has presented her compositions, improvisations and installations for balloons throughout North America and Europe at many venues including Lincoln Center Out-of-Doors, REDCAT, the SoHo Arts Festival, the Alternative Museum, the Knitting Factory, Performance Space 122, Roulette, Experimental Intermedia, Soundlab, the New Museum of Contemporary Art, the Bang on a Can Festival, the Guelph Jazz Festival, Podewil, Diapason, Galerie Rachel Haferkamp and ZKM. She has performed as a balloon player in compositions by John Zorn and Roscoe Mitchell, and in improvisations and/or collaborations with the FLUX Quartet, performance artist Annie Sprinkle, Fluxus artist Yasunao Tone, video artist Zev Robinson, visual artists Nancy Davidson and Ken Butler, percussionists John Hollenbeck and Matt Moran, the Illuminati big band, DJ Singe (Beth Coleman), and numerous others. Her works for balloons include electronic and multi-media works, sound installations, and works that incorporate more traditional instrumentation such as string quartet, chorus and Japanese koto.

Awards include a recording grant from the Aaron Copland Fund of the American Music Center, a commission from the American Composers Forum's Composers Commissioning Fund, an artist/researcher-in-residency at Zentrum für Kunst und Medientechnologie, a recording residency at Harvestworks/Studio Pass, and grants from the National Endowment for the Arts, Meet the Composer and the Kalliste Foundation. Ms. Dunaway has published two articles in Musicworks magazine about her work with balloons: A History of the Balloon as a Sound Producer in Experimental Music (Fall 2001), and, Orchestration and Playing Techniques for Balloons as Sound Producers (Spring 2002). Ms. Dunaway's scores are published by Material Press (Frankfurt).

Dunaway has a Ph.D. in Music Composition from State University of New York at Stony Brook, where she studied with analog electronic music composer Daria Semegen and multi-media artist Christa Erickson, and a M.A. in Experimental Music from Wesleyan University (Connecticut) where she studied with composer Alvin Lucier. She also holds a B.S. in Music Education from Hunter College (New York City). In academic year 2004-2005 she was full-time Visiting Faculty in Sound at the School of the Museum of Fine Arts Boston. She is currently a Visiting Lecturer in the Art History Department at Massachusetts College of Art and Design.

Dunaway has also created other works, often to do with social activism or cultural critique. In late 2006 Dunaway founded "S.W.I.R.L." a not-for-profit educational website for audio art and activism concerning the rights of sex workers. Other works by Ms. Dunaway include Affirmative Action, a political multi-media piece utilizing sensor-activated projections as visual music, commissioned by percussionist Russell Greenberg; Sensation, a composition for audience presented at the Mixed Messages Festival where it was conducted by Jackie 60 Award-winner Baby Dee; Duo for Radio Stations, simulcast on WFMU (New Jersey) and WKCR (New York); and the score for Diane Torr's performance art piece Crossing the River Styx, the "high decibel music" that instigated the closing of the Franklin Furnace performance space in 1990.

== Discography ==
- Mother of Balloon Music (Innova Recordings 2006) - Compositions and improvisations for balloons by Judy Dunaway. Featuring performances by the FLUX Quartet, Ryuko Mizutani, Damian Catera and Judy Dunaway.
- Shar: Pop Music (Outer Realm Records 2001). Avant-noise-rock with balloons (Judy Dunaway), bass (Ilja Komarov) and drums (Trixa Arnold).
- Judy Dunaway: Balloon Music (Composers Recordings, Inc./CRI (now part of New World Records) 1998) - Compositions and improvisations for balloons, including collaborations with Yasunao Tone and Dan Evans Farkas.
- “The Alt.coffee Tapes” (Katahdin Recordings) - Balloon improvisation with Matt Moran and John Hollenbeck.
- “New York Guitars” compilation (Composers Recordings, Inc./CRI,1995) - “Fifty 210” (for electric guitar and Yamaha Fifty 210 amplifier) - Electric guitar composition.
- John Zorn's Cobra: Live at the Knitting Factory (Knitting Factory Works 1994) - Balloon, guitar and vocal improvisations in the context of the John Zorn composition “Cobra.”
- “Judy Dunaway and the Evan Gallagher Little Band” (AMF 1993/Lilly Myrtle Music 2002) - Art-rock compositions.
- “Judy Dunaway” (Lost 1991) - Avant-garde folk songs and free-improvisations.
