= Naked City Live, Vol. 1: The Knitting Factory 1989 =

Naked City Live, Vol 1, Knitting Factory 1989

Live album by Naked City
- Released: 2002
- Recorded: 1989, Knitting Factory, NYC
- Genre: Avant-garde jazz; free jazz; experimental rock
- Length: 51:57
- Label: Tzadik TZ 7336
- Producer: John Zorn

Naked City chronology
| Black Box (1996) | Naked City Live, Vol 1, Knitting Factory 1989 (2002) | Naked City: The Complete Studio Recordings (2005) |

John Zorn chronology
| First Live 1993 (2002) | Naked City Live, Vol 1: The Knitting Factory 1989 (2002) | IAO (2002) |

Naked City Live (subtitled Vol. 1: The Knitting Factory 1989) is a live album recorded by Naked City in 1989 and released on John Zorn's Tzadik label in 2002. All of the songs, with the exception of "Erotico", "The Way I Feel" and "Skate Key", were later recorded in the studio for the band's debut album. To date it is the only official live release by the band.

== Reception ==
Professional ratings
Review scores
| Source | Rating |
|---|---|
| Allmusic | 4/5 stars |
| Guy's Music Review | 8.5/10 stars |

The Allmusic review by Thom Jurek awarded the album 3½ stars noting that "This wonderfully recorded document from the dawn of the Knitting Factory provides ample evidence that Naked City was even more astonishing live than on their albums... This is not only essential for fans, but proves to be an accessible and wondrous introduction to a truly awesome, if short-lived, band." Guy Peters stated "Convoluted, tortuous, bizarre and demanding, Naked City's music feels like a rollercoaster-ride in an amusement park for perverse minds that are fed-up with Disney, spoon-fed revisions of the same old and other prefab excursions in predictability. It was not only an outlet for Zorn's outrage and frustration – he's often said that the in-your-face-brutality of the band was a way of dealing with certain personal matters and venting anger – but also the postmodern ethic of genre-bending and cut 'n' paste tactics taken to an extreme. It all wouldn't have been half as interesting if the band hadn't been such a gathering of jazz monsters."

== Track listing ==
All tracks composed by John Zorn except as indicated.

1. "Batman" – 2:07
2. "Latin Quarter" – 4:06
3. "You Will Be Shot" – 1:24
4. "Shot in the Dark" (Henry Mancini) – 3:32
5. "Skate Key" – 1:06
6. "Erotico" (Ennio Morricone) – 5:24
7. "Snagglepuss" – 2:09
8. "I Want to Live" (Johnny Mandel) – 1:58
9. "New York Flattop Box" – 0:44
10. "Inside Straight" – 8:13
11. "Chinatown" (Jerry Goldsmith) – 6:04
12. "Igneous Ejaculation" – 0:22
13. "Ujaku" – 0:31
14. "Blood Duster" – 0:17
15. "Hammerhead" – 0:12
16. "Speedball" – 0:44
17. "Obeah Man" – 0:19
18. "Den of Sins" – 1:19
19. "Demon Sanctuary" – 0:56
20. "The Way I Feel" (John Patton) – 10:37

== Musicians ==
- John Zorn – alto saxophone
- Bill Frisell – guitar
- Wayne Horvitz – keyboards
- Fred Frith – bass
- Joey Baron – drums
