= First Live 1993 =

Live album by Masada
- Released: April 23, 2002
- Recorded: September 12, 1993
- Genre: Downtown music Avant-garde jazz
- Length: 47:09
- Label: Tzadik TZ 7337
- Producer: John Zorn

Masada chronology
Live at Tonic 2001 (2001)	First Live 1993 (2002)	50th Birthday Celebration Volume 7 (2004)

John Zorn chronology
Hockey (2002)	First Live 1993 (2002)	Naked City Live, Vol. 1: The Knitting Factory 1989 (2002)

First Live 1993 is a live album by John Zorn's Masada documenting their premier live appearance at the Knitting Factory in September, 1993.

== Reception ==
The Allmusic review by Thom Jurek awarded the album 3 stars, stating, "For the fanatics who have everything Masada, this is no exception in its necessity. For the curious and cautious, this is a wonderfully accessible place to begin an odyssey".

Professional ratings
Review scores
Source	Rating
Allmusic	3/5 stars

== Track listing ==
All compositions by John Zorn

1. "Piram" – 5:55
2. "Sansanah" – 7:10
3. "Ziphim" – 7:16
4. "Zebdi" – 5:00
5. "Hadasha" – 7:38
6. "Rachab/Lebaoth" – 7:04
7. "Hazor" – 7:02
- Recorded live at the Knitting Factory on September 12, 1993

== Personnel ==
Masada

- John Zorn – saxophone
- Dave Douglas – trumpet
- Greg Cohen – bass
- Joey Baron – drums
