= Absinthe (Naked City album) =

Studio album by Naked City
- Released: December 10, 1993
- Recorded: December 1992
- Studios: Electric Lady Studio, New York City
- Genres: Ambient; noise; Experimental
- Length: 46:17
- Label: Avant Avan 004
- Producer: John Zorn

Naked City chronology
| Radio (1993) | Absinthe (1993) | Naked City Live, Vol. 1: The Knitting Factory 1989 (2002) |

John Zorn chronology
| Radio (1993) | Absinthe (1993) | Execution Ground (1994) |

Absinthe is the fifth and final studio album by the band Naked City. Unlike the band's other genre-mixing releases, the music on Absinthe is consistently in an ambient and noise style.

The titles of many of its tracks refer to the works of Paul Verlaine, Charles Baudelaire and other figures in the fin de siècle Decadent movement, and to the drink after which the album is named. The album's cover and liner notes feature photographs by the German Surrealist Hans Bellmer. The official description on the Forced Exposure website states that "Joey Baron plays bags of dry leaves, fishing reels and buckshot. Bill Frisell solos on a microtonal guitar. Wayne Horvitz samples everything from crickets to Giacinto Scelsi. Fred Frith does what he does best. Zorn doesn't even touch the saxophone."

The final track, "...Rend Fou", is a six-minute recording of Frisell and Frith running their guitar jacks over the inputs of their guitars.

The album was also released as part of Naked City: The Complete Studio Recordings on Tzadik Records.

== Reception ==
Professional ratings
Review scores
| Source | Rating |
|---|---|
| Allmusic | 2.5/5 stars |

The Allmusic review by Caleb Deupree states "Naked City's final album is by far its most puzzling and enigmatic... Nothing in Naked City's previous oeuvre prepares the listener for this collection, a complete reversal from the hardcore and thrash metal, but looking forward to Zorn's interest in minimalist pieces like Redbird and Duras."

== Track listing ==
All compositions by John Zorn

| No. | Title | Length |
|---|---|---|
| 1. | "Val de Travers" | 6:19 |
| 2. | "Une Correspondance" | 5:09 |
| 3. | "La Fée Verte" | 5:12 |
| 4. | "Fleurs Du Mal" | 4:06 |
| 5. | "Artemisia Absinthium" | 4:31 |
| 6. | "Notre Dame De L'oubli (For Olivier Messiaen)" | 4:48 |
| 7. | "Verlaine: Part I: Un Midi Moins Dix" | 4:24 |
| 8. | "Verlaine: Part II: La Bleue" | 6:01 |
| 9. | "...Rend Fou" | 6:03 |

== Personnel ==
- John Zorn – vocals, synthesizer, sampler
- Bill Frisell – guitar
- Fred Frith – bass guitar
- Wayne Horvitz – keyboards, synthesizer, sampler
- Joey Baron – percussion

== Liner Notes ==
- Published by Theatre of Musical Optics, BMI
- Produced by John Zorn
- Executive Producer: Disk Union
- Recorded at Electric Lady, NYC December 1992
- Mixed at Platinum Island, NYC January 1993
- Engineered by Joe Ferla
- Assistant Engineer: Hoover Le
- Mastered by Scott Hull
- Cover photo: Hans Bellmer "Les Jeux de la Poupée"
- Design: Tomoyo T.L. (Karath=Razar)
- Photo typesetting: Lisa Wells
- Special thanks to: Fujieda Mamoru, Giacinto Scelsi, Mick Harris
