= Eric Qin =

American composer

- Born: Eric Lee Qin; 1967; New York City, New York, U.S.
- Died: April 19, 1993 (aged 25); Manhattan, New York, U.S.
- Occupation: Composer

Eric Lee Chin, also known as Eric Qin (1967 – April 19, 1993), was an American composer of experimental music. While studying at the Mannes College of Music in New York City in the early 1990s, Qin founded the Rough Assemblage composers' collective, along with Mark Degli Antoni and Norman Yamada.

Born and raised in New York City, Qin was killed in a bicycle accident on the Upper West Side of Manhattan on April 19, 1993, at the age of 25. His music was performed posthumously at the 1993 Bang on a Can Festival, and a CD of his music entitled Photographs was released in 2002.

== Discography ==
- Qin, Eric. Photographs (2002). New York, New York: Tzadik.
- Rough Assemblage (1995). Construction and Demolition. Japan: Avant.
