= Mark Ettinger =

American singer-songwriter

Mark Ettinger is an American singer, songwriter, conductor, multi-instrumentalist, and juggler from New York City. From 1998 to 2016 he performed regularly as a member of the Flying Karamazov Brothers under the stage name Alexei Karamazov.

== Background ==
Born in Manhattan, Ettinger started his musical life after taking piano lessons as a child. During his teens, he played keyboards and bass for a variety of local bands, including Joey Miserable and the Worms, The Special Guests, The Hues Blues Band, and David Peel and the Lower East Side. After studying music, philosophy, and literature at Columbia University, he received his master's degree in composition and conducting from Mannes College of Music. He stayed at Mannes for several years as a professor, until he was offered a job as a performer with the Flying Karamazov Brothers.

== Alexei Karamazov ==
In 1998, Ettinger joined the Flying Karamazov Brothers, the world-famous juggling troupe. Selected for his musical talents and theatrical experience, he was dubbed Alexei Karamazov. His first show as a Karamazov was the technology-based L'Universe. He has since performed in Catch!, Life: A Guide For The Perplexed, and the Orchestra Shows, in which he has acted as conductor for various orchestras, including the Seattle Symphony, the Cincinnati Symphony Orchestra, and the Dallas Symphony.

== In This World ==
In 2005, Ettinger released his debut CD, In This World, a collection of original songs featuring a variety of guest artists. The style ranges from folk to rock to blues.

Track Listing

1. Excerpt – the Victrola Mix
2. Come Back Home
3. Into an Hourglass
4. Chester Town
5. Hey Darling
6. Do You Know the Way Home?
7. In the Shallows
8. How Can I Be Sad?
9. Flickering Flame
10. Strange Emotions
11. Caroline
12. Teacup
13. Feed Us All (Papa Ray)
14. Lay Your Cares Aside
15. No More Sorrow
16. In This World

In This World is co-produced by David Seitz (Dar Williams, Richard Shindell, Christine Lavin, Bruce Springsteen). Many renowned musicians join him on these recordings, including Steven Bernstein (Lou Reed), Kenny Wollesen (Norah Jones) and Doug Wieselman (Lucinda Williams).
