= Live at Tonic 2001 =

Live album by Masada
- Released: September 2001
- Recorded: June 16, 2001
- Genre: Downtown music Avant-garde jazz
- Length: 141:44
- Label: Tzadik TZ 7334
- Producer: John Zorn

Masada chronology
Live in Sevilla 2000 (2000)	Live at Tonic 2001 (2001)	First Live 1993 (2002)

John Zorn chronology
Filmworks X: In the Mirror of Maya Deren (2001)	Live at Tonic 2001 (2001)	First Live 1993 (2002)

Live at Tonic 2001 is a double album by Masada featuring two sets recorded live at Tonic during one evening in New York's Lower East Side.

== Reception ==
The Allmusic review by Thom Jurek awarded the album 4½ stars, stating:

Live at Tonic is perhaps the most revealing and astonishing record yet by Masada, because it was recorded before a very discriminating audience of enthusiasts not only in the band's hometown, but also in its home club.

Professional ratings
Review scores
Source	Rating
Allmusic	4.5/5 stars
The Penguin Guide to Jazz Recordings	3.5/4 stars

== Track listing ==
All compositions by John Zorn

- Disc one
1. "Intro" - 1:23
2. "Karaim" - 17:50
3. "Ner Tamid" - 5:07
4. "Acharei Mot" - 11:07
5. "Kisofim" - 7:12
6. "Jachin" - 6:30
7. "Malkhut" - 4:52
8. "Nashim" - 6:38
- Disc two
1. "Intro" - 0:30
2. "Lilin" - 14:43
3. "Khebar" - 5:59
4. "Galshan" - 5:35
5. "Malkhut" - 4:49
6. "Shevet" - 8:08
7. "Shamor" - 7:40
8. "Acharei Mot" - 10:27
9. "Kisofim" - 8:35
10. "Shechem" - 14:06

- Recorded live at Tonic, New York City on June 16, 2001

== Personnel ==
Masada

- John Zorn - saxophone
- Dave Douglas - trumpet
- Greg Cohen - bass
- Joey Baron - drums

== Notes ==
- Produced by John Zorn in association with Kazunori Sugiyama
- Published by THEATER OF MUSICAL OPTICS
- Mastered by Allan Tucker
- Designed by Heung-Heung Chin
