= Naked City, Las Vegas =

Naked City
- Neighborhood of Las Vegas
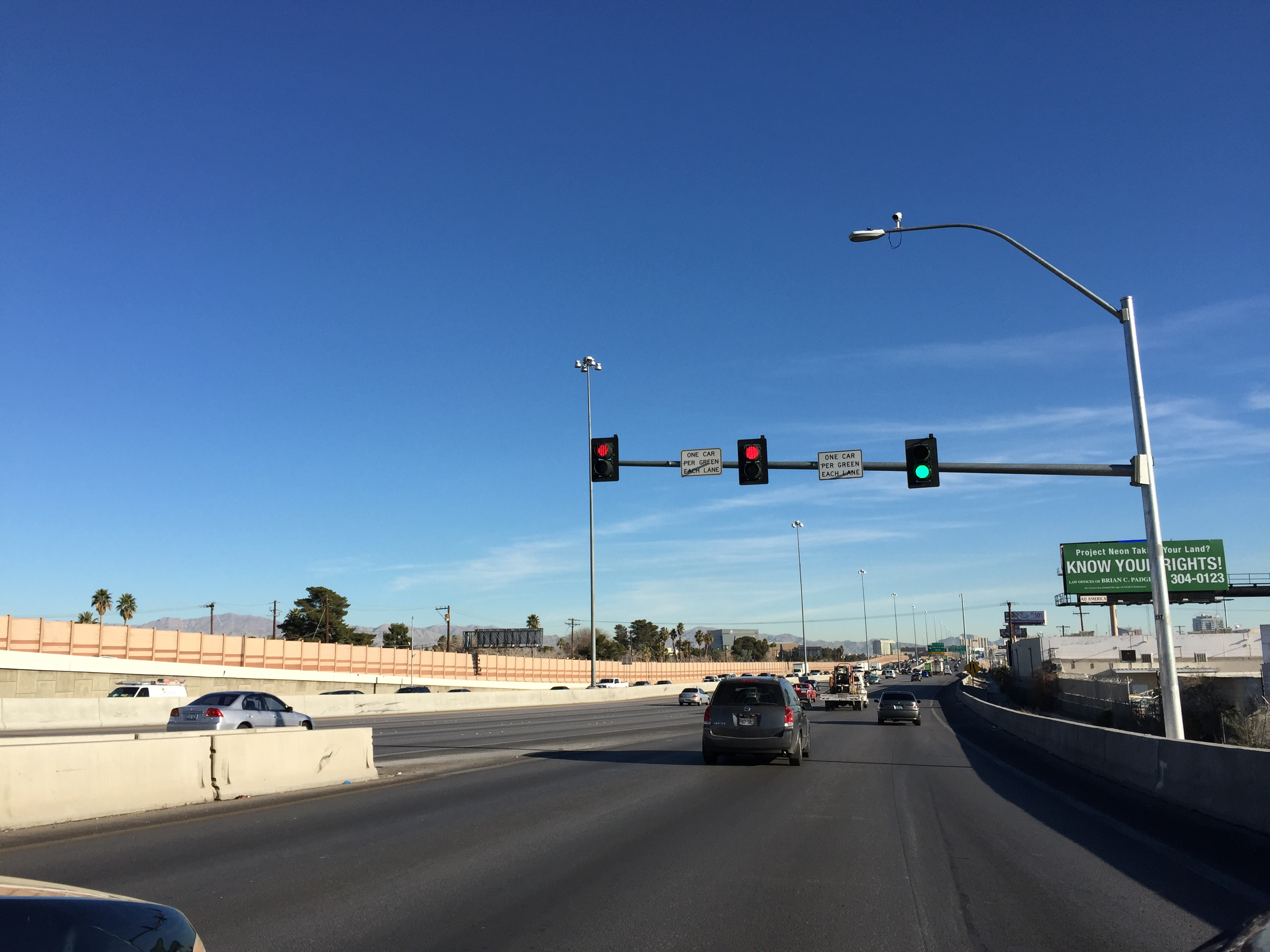
- Sahara Avenue in Las Vegas, the border road of Naked City
- Interactive map of Naked City
- Country: United States
- State: Nevada
- County: Clark County
- City: Las Vegas
- Founded: 1920s
- Named for: Southern Downtown Gateway District

Area
  - Total: 0.15625 sq mi (0.4047 km^{2})

Population (2017)
  - Total: 35,759
  - Density: 228,860/sq mi (88,362/km^{2})

Economics
- ZIP Code: 89102
- Area code: 702

Naked City is the nickname for a neighborhood located in Las Vegas, Nevada, a sub-section of the Gateway District. The neighborhood is located at the northern end of the Las Vegas Strip, near the intersection of Las Vegas Boulevard and Sahara Avenue, bordered to the west by Tam Drive, and to the north by New York Avenue.

The neighborhood was originally known as Meadows Addition. The term "Naked City" was applied to the area in the early 1980s by Metro police and newspapers during a spike in gang-related crime. A legend popularized later claims the area was dubbed Naked City for its population of suntanning showgirls in the 1950s; however, there are no verified references to the neighborhood as Naked City before the early 1980s.

The most prominent development in the neighborhood is The Strat hotel and tower. In May 2018, the apartment complexes in Naked City were renovated in an effort to reduce crime.
