= Lacrosse (album) =

Studio album by John Zorn
- Released: January 25, 2000
- Recorded: June 1977 – June 10, 1978
- Genre: Avant-garde
- Length: 101:53
- Label: Tzadik

John Zorn chronology
Lacrosse (2000)	Hockey (2002)

School Cover

Lacrosse is a double album by John Zorn. It is made up of different takes of his early game piece, "Lacrosse". The first disc is from WKCR in June 1978 where Mark Abbott, Polly Bradfield, Eugene Chadbourne, and LaDonna Smith and Zorn recorded six different takes. Takes 3, 4 and 6 were originally released on the Parachute Records double LP School (1978). The second disc is the original recording of "Lacrosse" which was made by Eugene Chadbourne, Henry Kaiser, Bruce Ackley, and Zorn (dubbed "Twins") in San Francisco, California in June 1977.

Lacrosse was originally released in 1997 as a part of The Parachute Years box set and then released on its own in 2000.

== Reception ==
The Allmusic review by Joslyn Layne awarded the album two stars, stating "The release consists of a number of takes, or outcomes, of two different groups of musicians performing this structure for improvisation."

Professional ratings
Review scores
Source	Rating
Allmusic	2/5 stars

== Track listing ==
- Disc one
1. "Take 3" – 23:06
2. "Take 4" – 19:06
3. "Take 6" – 6:20
4. "Take 1" – 7:01
5. "Take 2" – 8:08
6. "Take 5" – 8:16
- Disc two
1. "Twins Version" – 29:56

All compositions by John Zorn.
- Disc two recorded June 1977 in San Francisco, Disc one recorded at WKCR, New York on June 10, 1978

== Personnel ==
- John Zorn – alto saxophone, clarinet, soprano saxophone, liner notes
- Mark Abbott – electronics
- Bruce Ackley – soprano saxophone, liner notes
- Allen Asaf – engineer
- Polly Bradfield – violin, viola, electric violin
- Eugene Chadbourne – acoustic guitar, dobro, electric guitar, twelve string guitar, liner notes, tiple, six string bass, twelve string acoustic guitar
- Henry Kaiser – electric guitar
- LaDonna Smith – violin, viola
- Davey Williams – banjo, electric guitar, hollow body guitar
