= WRPI =

- Troy, New York; United States
- Broadcast area: Capital District
- Frequency: 91.5 MHz
- Branding: The Upstate Underground

Programming
- Format: College Radio
- Affiliations: Pacifica Radio Network

Ownership
- Owner: Rensselaer Polytechnic Institute Board of Trustees

History
- First air date: 1957; 69 years ago
- Call sign meaning: Rensselaer Polytechnic Institute

Technical information
- Licensing authority: FCC
- Facility ID: 55742
- Class: B1
- ERP: 10,000 watts
- HAAT: 113 meters (371 feet)
- Transmitter coordinates: 42.687°N 73.706°W

Links
- Public license information: Public file; LMS
- Webcast: Listen live (320 kbps); Listen live (256 kbps); Listen live (128 kbps); Listen live (64 kbps); Listen live (16 kbps)
- Website: www.wrpi.org

WRPI (91.5 FM) is a non-commercial free-form college radio station, run entirely by students attending Rensselaer Polytechnic Institute, and staffed by community members and students. WRPI broadcasts every day with an effective radiated power of 10,000 watts, serving listeners in New York's Capital District, and online via live streaming. The station's studios are located in the basement of the Darrin Communications Center and the FM signal is broadcast from North Greenbush. Programming includes a wide range of music, cultural and public affairs programs, live bands, special events, and sports simulcasts, particularly of RPI hockey, football, and baseball. WRPI has a large record library dating to the origins of the station, estimated at 43,800 albums, and a large CD library, dating to the start of the medium.

== History ==
=== Founding ===
The predecessor to WRPI was an RPI-owned AM broadcasting radio station known as WHAZ. WHAZ began broadcasting in 1922, and was among the first radio stations to broadcast within the United States. First issued to Rensselaer Polytechnic Institute on July 18, 1922, the school extended their license for many years thereafter. This ended with the transfer of the license to WPOW in 1967. While under the ownership of the school, WHAZ found itself under the stewardship of several groups throughout the years. In 1924, the founding of Campus Review, an entertainment broadcasting group, began the focus of the radio station in broadcasting college-centered entertainment and radio for the Troy, New York area. Twenty-three years later, in the spring of 1947, Carl J. Kunz Jr. founded the "Rensselaer Broadcasting Association", which took charge of managing broadcasting time slots not used by Campus Review. The Association would completely employ the service of students from RPI to run activities. In that same year, the school's radio club began broadcasting their own AM radio station under the call sign W2SZ. The most popular and active station broadcasting on campus at the time, this station was informally referred to by students as WRPI.

=== Unification ===
At this point, three different clubs across the university's campus were managing radio broadcasts. The RPI Student Union proceeded to consolidate the clubs into one, the Radio Counsel, by the end of 1948. Only three years later, in 1951, the Radio Counsel was disbanded and divided into two groups: an amateur radio group, and a broadcast group. The amateur radio group still exists under the old banner of W2SZ. As for the broadcast group, WRPI continued to function on AM channels, where it captured the majority of the campus listener audience at the time.

=== Move to FM ===
Without a broadcast tower or industry-grade equipment, WRPI had a meager broadcast range. In many cases, signals could not reach some parts of the college campus. In 1956, the station proposed a move to FM broadcasting, to take advantage of its high-fidelity capability. On December 4, 1957, the FCC approved WRPI to begin broadcasting on 91.5 FM, where it continues to broadcast today. This accompanied the construction of a 30-foot (9.1 m) tower, extending the range of the station to nearly all of Troy, Albany, and Schenectady.

=== Growth and evolution ===
Differing from FM radio stations of the time, WRPI found itself the sole broadcaster of popular music in the area. In 1967, the station switched to a progressive rock-themed station, abandoning its former free-form radio status. In addition, WTEN-TV donated a 606-foot (185 m) radio tower in North Greenbush, New York, which is still used by the station today. This move increased broadcast strength from 750 watts to 10,000 watts. WRPI abandoned use of AM signals and extended range to cover large swaths of New York as well as some areas in Vermont and Massachusetts.

=== The station today ===
During the mid-1970s, as other FM rock-and-roll radio stations began to form, WRPI made the decision to revert to their former free-form radio format. In addition, the station established their studio in the basement of RPI's Darren Communications Center, where it has remained ever since. The station continues to be completely student-run, allowing virtually anyone to receive training, and potentially broadcast on a time slot. In addition to broadcasting on 91.5 FM, the station may also be listened to over the internet.

== Outage 2024 ==
WRPI (91.5 FM) went off the air in April 2024 due to storm damage to their transmitter tower. As of August 30, 2024, the station was broadcasting again at a lower power. This returned to full power on November 6, 2024.

WRPI's webstream was offline February through June 2024.

When the website returned, it served as a minimal homepage with a webcast player. The website only responded to http; old https links and shortcuts to it were broken. As of February 6, 2024, https links returned, and the website was updated with a new look.
