= Naked City (band) =

American band

- Clockwise from left: Wayne Horvitz, John Zorn, Bill Frisell, Fred Frith, Joey Baron.

Background information
- Origin: New York City, U.S.
- Genres: Avant-garde; grindcore; avant-garde metal; free jazz; experimental
- Years active: 1988–1993 (brief 2003 reunion)
- Labels: Elektra Nonesuch, Avant, Earache, Tzadik
- Past members: John Zorn; Bill Frisell; Fred Frith; Wayne Horvitz; Joey Baron; Yamatsuka Eye

Naked City was an avant-garde music group led by saxophonist and composer John Zorn. Active primarily in New York City from 1988 to 1993, Naked City was initiated by Zorn as a "composition workshop" to test the limits of composition (and improvisation) in a traditional rock band lineup. Their music incorporated elements of jazz, surf, progressive rock, classical, heavy metal, grindcore, punk rock, and other genres.

== History ==
Named after a 1945 book of graphic black and white photographs by Weegee, the band performed an aggressive mix of "soundtrack themes, bluesy hard bop, speedy hardcore rock, squealing free jazz [and] metallic funk". In Naked City's characteristic early style, songs were often performed at astonishingly fast tempos, drawing on thrash metal and hardcore punk's emphasis on extreme speed. Many songs were quite brief, and typically switched musical genres every few measures. One critic described the band's music as "jump-cutting micro-collages of hardcore, country, sleazy jazz, covers of John Barry and Ornette Coleman, brief abstract tussles—a whole city crammed into two or three minute bursts". This fast-change tendency was inspired in part by Carl Stalling—a Zorn favorite—who wrote music for many Warner Bros. cartoons, that featured frequent shifts in tempo, theme and style.

Naked City's first album was distributed under Zorn's name by Nonesuch Records and featured a Weegee photograph of a dead gangster on its cover, along with macabre illustrations by Maruo Suehiro. Zorn stated that "Naked City started with rhythm and blues/Spillane type things then went into this hard-core thing ... because I was living in Japan and experiencing a lot of alienation and rejection ... My interest in hard-core also spurred the urge to write shorter and shorter pieces." There was disagreement between Zorn and the label over cover art on subsequent albums. Zorn wanted to use explicit S&M pictures, images from 19th century medical archives, and execution photographs, most notoriously of a Leng Tch'e victim; Nonesuch refused. Zorn ended his relationship with the label, releasing subsequent Naked City albums on Shimmy Disc and his own Avant and Tzadik labels.

The album Torture Garden (1989) featured "hardcore miniatures", intense brief compositions often lasting less than a minute. Some of these tracks had also featured on the band's debut and others would resurface on the band's next full-length release, Grand Guignol (1992), which also included performances of works by Claude Debussy, Alexander Scriabin, Orlande de Lassus, Charles Ives, and Olivier Messiaen.

The band's third album, Heretic (1992), featured more of these short improvisations produced for the soundtrack of an underground S/M film Jeux des Dames Cruelles. The band released Leng Tch'e, in 1992 featuring a single composition which lasted just over half an hour. Radio, released in 1993, was the first Naked City album composed solely by Zorn, and featured tracks crediting a wide range of musical influences.

The final recording from the band, Absinthe (1993), featured a blend of ambient noise-styled compositions with tracks titled after the works of Paul Verlaine, Charles Baudelaire and other figures in the fin de siècle Decadent movement, and a dedication to Olivier Messiaen.

Zorn discontinued Naked City when he felt "the need to write music for other ensembles, in other contexts, with new ideas". A brief 15th anniversary reunion occurred in 2003 for two shows in Amsterdam and Warsaw respectively.

== Cinematic connections ==
The group covered numerous film soundtrack cuts, including work by Georges Delerue. Heretic was intended as the soundtrack for a film starring Karen Finley.

The tracks "Bonehead" and "Hellraiser", from Torture Garden, are featured in the opening sequence of Michael Haneke's film Funny Games and its 2007 remake.

== Band members ==
- John Zorn – alto saxophone
- Bill Frisell – electric guitar
- Fred Frith – bass guitar
- Wayne Horvitz – keyboards
- Joey Baron – drums
- Yamatsuka Eye – vocals

Live members

- Mike Patton – vocals (1991 and 2003)
- Cyro Baptista – percussion (1989)
- Carol Emanuel – harp (1989)
- Kermit Driscoll - bass (1988)

== Discography ==
Studio albums

- Naked City (1990)
- Grand Guignol (1992)
- Heretic (1992)
- Leng Tch'e (1992)
- Radio (1993)
- Absinthe (1993)

Live albums

- Naked City Live, Vol. 1: The Knitting Factory 1989 (2002)

Compilation albums

- Torture Garden (contains the "hardcore miniatures" that were also released on the albums Naked City and Grand Guignol) (1990)
- Black Box (contains the albums Torture Garden and Leng Tch'e, originally released only in Japan) (1996)
- Naked City: The Complete Studio Recordings (Box Set) (2005)
