= Polly Bradfield =

American violinist

- Genres: Free improvisation
- Instrument: Violin
- Years active: 1977–1986
- Label: Parachute

Polly Bradfield is an American violinist from the New York City free improvisation scene of the late 1970s and early 1980s. Her closest musical associates were Eugene Chadbourne and John Zorn. She also played on records by William Parker and Frank Lowe. Her music career ended when she moved to California sometime in the 1980s. Her last appearance on record was on Zorn's The Big Gundown in 1986.

== Biography ==
"I began playing music when I was 8 or 9. First piano, then violin. I preferred to play classical literature, but I started improvising by playing piano in a high school stage band. I studied jazz in college after hearing Cecil Taylor I started developing a style of improvisation on the piano, playing with many different musicians and performing occasionally. When I met Eugene Chadbourne and John Zorn on moving to New York, I quit playing the piano and concentrated on the violin. My playing really changed and so did my attitudes about music and improvising..." (from Bradfield's own liner notes on the back of her Solo Violin Improvisations LP)

== Influences & Influenced ==
In the same liner notes, she lists her musical inspirations: Paganini, Bartók, Ives, Ligeti, Django Reinhardt, Stuff Smith, Eddie South, Joe Venuti, The Sacred Guitar and Violin music of the Modern Aztecs, Jean Carignan, Swedish fiddle music, and Cajun string bands. (She also thanks Zorn and Chadbourne for their effect on her music.)

A song named after Polly Bradfield was released by Two Of Substance in early 2019.

== Solo music ==
In 1979 she released an LP on Chadbourne's Parachute label called Solo Violin Improvisations. The cover shows a photo of a young girl, presumably Bradfield as a child, sawing a branch off a tree, a pun on violin playing described as "sawing". The album contains more silence than sawing, though; her scrapes, scratches, plunks, and occasional notes on the violin are often separated by long stretches of it. Her radically still, non-discursive, Cageian style on this little known LP foreshadows later trends in free improvisation.

Eugene Chadbourne describes the album as "a controlled masterwork of severely intense playing" .

In her liner notes, Bradfield writes "The music on this record is all acoustic violin. Usually I use an amplifier when performing, but I wanted my first solo recording to be acoustic. I felt it was a small way to pay homage to the instrument's long and diverse history which began long before electricity was discovered."

== Remarks from other musicians ==
=== Kevin Drumm ===
"Whatever happened to Polly? Amazing and unique solo LP released on Eugene Chadbourne’s Parachute label. Best solo improv record ever." (from Dusted Magazine )

=== Eugene Chadbourne ===
"...violinist Polly Bradfield... whatever happened to her? She's still playing. She had a lot of children and went out to California. She was never that driven to have a musical career. She was a really interesting musician though, I really liked her. Very extreme. I think her solo violin album is one of the best things I've ever heard. Do you know that? I have to send you a copy. I've got lots of copies, because when she left New York, in a big hurry, she piled her records out in the street, so I kept them; every now and then I meet somebody who wants one or who I think ought to have one. We did a couple of concerts together in England and Belgium that came out on a record, Torture Time--that was another nice album."

(from an interview by Dan Warburton )

=== Fred Frith ===
"Polly Bradfield’s solo playing was quite different -- harder, less lyrical and treading a tightrope between controlled and contrived. I thought she had a lot of bottle actually, because she’s chosen a difficult path; her playing is austere and uncompromising, a little stiff; she takes chances; her use of silence is similar to John Zorn’s, though her humour’s dryer (it’s there though). After she’d played I felt mentally excited but earthbound."

=== John Zorn ===
"About seven and a half minutes into the fourth take of "Lacrosse", Polly Bradfield plucks the C natural... this note was one of the great musical experiences of my life... notes like this C natural... are what music is all about for me, but they are too rare." (from his liner notes to School)

=== John Corbett ===
"Boxes of this brilliant fiddle outing, one of the best records of its kind, were reputedly discarded by Bradfield, having gone unsold for years. Knotty, intense, nuanced little sounds by an important early associate of John Zorn and Eugene Chadbourne." (from Vinyl Freak: Love Letters to a Dying Medium, Duke University Press (2017), page 178)

== Discography ==
- The Frank Lowe Orchestra, Lowe and Behold (Musicworks, 1978; recorded 1977)
- Eugene Chadbourne & John Zorn, School (Parachute, 1978)
- William Parker, Through Acceptance of the Mystery Peace (Centering, 1979)
- Polly Bradfield, Solo Violin Improvisations (Parachute, 1979)
- Eugene Chadbourne, 2000 Statues/The English Channel (Parachute, 1979)
- Lesli Dalaba, Trumpet Songs and Dances (Solos & Duets) LP (Parachute, 1979)
- Andrea Centazzo, Environment for Sextet (Ictus, 1979)
- Andrea Centazzo, USA Concerts (Ictus, 1979)
- John Zorn, Pool (Parachute, 1980)
- Eugene Chadbourne & Polly Bradfield, Torture Time (Parachute, 1981)
- John Zorn, Archery (Parachute, 1982)
- Curlew, North America (Moers, 1986; recorded 1984–85)
- John Zorn, The Big Gundown (Nonesuch, 1986)
- Eugene Chadbourne & John Zorn, Sonora (1977–1981) (Materiali Sonori, 1998)
- John Zorn, The Parachute Years (Tzadik, 1997)
- John Zorn, Lacrosse (Tzadik, 2000; recorded 1978)
- Eugene Chadbourne, Vision-Ease (House of Chadula, 2000; recorded 1978)
- John Zorn, Hockey (Tzadik, 2002)
