= Pool (John Zorn album) =

Studio album by John Zorn
- Released: 1980, 1997 & 2000
- Recorded: March 1, 1980
- Genre: Avant-garde
- Length: 55:15
- Label: Parachute P011/12; Tzadik TZ 7316
- Producer: John Zorn

John Zorn chronology
| Pool (1980) | Archery (1982) |

Tzadik Edition

Pool is an album by John Zorn featuring his early "game piece" composition of the same name which was first released on vinyl on Parachute Records in 1980 as a double album including the composition "Hockey". The album was released on CD on Tzadik Records with an additional bonus track featuring a test recording of Archery as part of The Parachute Years Box Set in 1997 and as a single CD in 2000. The album was the first released solely under Zorn's name following his collaboration with Eugene Chadbourne, School (1978).

== Reception ==
The AllMusic review by Joclyn Layne stated: "Dedicated fans should check this out, as it is part of the early annals of Zorn. Listeners with less patience for music theory -- and Zorn skeptics -- should save Pool for later, because it will not win anyone over; nor will the compositional theories become more clear upon listening. Essentially, Pool has more historical value than listening interest."

Professional ratings
Review scores
| Source | Rating |
|---|---|
| AllMusic | 3/5 stars |
| Spin Alternative Record Guide | 7/10 |

== Track listing ==
All compositions by John Zorn

Original Vinyl Release

Side One
| No. | Title | Length |
|---|---|---|
| 1. | "Pool" | 17:12 |

Side Two
| No. | Title | Length |
|---|---|---|
| 1. | "Pool (continued)" | 16:40 |

Side Three
| No. | Title | Length |
|---|---|---|
| 1. | "Pool (conclusion)" | 17:20 |

Side Four
| No. | Title | Length |
|---|---|---|
| 1. | "Hockey (first version)" | 11:16 |
| 2. | "Hockey (second version, take 2)" | 3:42 |
| 3. | "Hockey (second version, take 5)" | 2:43 |
| 4. | "Hockey (second version, take 8)" | 0:50 |
| 5. | "Hockey (second version, take 10)" | 0:59 |

CD Release

1. "Pool" - 50:45
2. "Archery (test and false start)" - 3:30 Bonus track on CD release
- Recorded at Sorcerer Sound Studio, New York City on March 1, 1980

== Personnel ==
- Polly Bradfield - Violin
- Mark E. Miller - Percussion, Contact Microphones, Vibraphone
- Charles K. Noyes - Percussion, Saw, Knene
- Bob Ostertag - Electronics
- John Zorn - Alto and Soprano Saxophones, Bb Clarinet, Game Calls, E-flat Clarinet
