= Leng Tch'e (album) =

Studio album by Naked City
- Released: November 1, 1992
- Recorded: January 11, 1992
- Genre: Avant-garde; drone metal; avant-garde metal
- Length: 31:38
- Label: Toy's Factory
- Producer: John Zorn

Naked City chronology
Heretic (1992)	Leng Tch'e (1992)	Radio (1993)

John Zorn chronology
Elegy (1992)	Leng Tch'e (1992)	Kristallnacht (1993)

Leng Tch'e is the fourth release from John Zorn's band Naked City. It consists of a single track, running at just over half an hour. It was first released on the Japanese Toys Factory label in 1992. Unlike Naked City's previously material, which was known for its fast tempo and rapid transitions between a variety of heterogeneous styles, Leng Tch'e is a more avant-garde take on sludge metal. It was reissued in 1997 along with Torture Garden in the double-disc collection Black Box.

The cover photograph features a Chinese man being subjected to the Leng Tch'e method of torture, the overarching theme of the piece.

== Bataille quote ==
From the liner notes:

Research into the relationship between violence and the sacred led Zorn to the writings of Georges Bataille. The historical photographs used in Leng Tch'e (found in Tears of Eros) were taken circa 1905 in Beijing to document the last public execution utilizing leng tch'e (hundred pieces) which dates from the Manchu dynasty. Given opium to extend the victim's life during the arduous process, the look of ecstasy on the man's face haunted Bataille:

"This photograph had a decisive role in my life. I have never stopped being obsessed by this image of pain, at once ecstatic and intolerable. I wonder what the Marquis de Sade would have thought of this image, Sade who dreamed of torture, (which was inaccessible to him) but who never witnessed an actual torture session. In one way or another this image was incessantly before his eyes. But Sade would have wanted to see it in solitude, at least in relative solitude, without which the ecstatic and voluptuous effect is inconceivable. What I suddenly saw, and what imprisoned me in anguish — but which at the same time delivered me from it — was the identity of these perfect contraries, divine ecstasy and its opposite, extreme horror. And this is my inevitable conclusion to a history of eroticism."
— Georges Bataille, liner notes

The liner notes present an abridgment of Bataille's remarks on p. 206–207 of Tears of Eros.

Bataille also wrote about the photograph in Inner Experience: "In particular, I would gaze at the photographic image – or sometimes the memory which I have of it – of a Chinese man who must have been tortured in my lifetime. Of this torture, I had had in the past a series of successive representations. In the end, the patient writhed, his chest flayed, arms and legs cut off at the elbows and at the knees. His hair standing on end, hideous, hagard, striped with blood, beautiful as a wasp."

== Track listing ==
Composition by John Zorn

1. "Leng Tch'e" – 31:37

== Personnel ==
- John Zorn – alto sax, vocals
- Bill Frisell – guitar
- Wayne Horvitz – keyboards
- Fred Frith – bass
- Joey Baron – drums
- Yamatsuka Eye – vocals

== Liner notes ==
- Published by Theatre of Musical Optics, BMI
- Produced by John Zorn
- Recorded by Alec Head
- Mastered by Bob Ludwig
- Design: Tomoyo T.L.
- Thanks: Patton, the Melvins
