= Naked City (album) =

Studio album by John Zorn
- Released: February 16, 1990
- Recorded: 1989
- Genres: Avant-garde jazz; no wave; grindcore; avant-garde metal
- Length: 55:14
- Label: Elektra Nonesuch
- Producer: John Zorn

John Zorn chronology
Filmworks VII: Cynical Hysterie Hour (1989)	Naked City (1990)	Attention Span (1990)

Naked City is an album by John Zorn, released on Elektra Nonesuch in February 1990. The band assembled by Zorn for the album would later become Naked City. The album is characterized by its covers of movie themes and its fusion of various musical genres.

== Content ==
The group Zorn assembled for the material recorded on Naked City would later become a band in its own right known under the same name; the lineup was Zorn on alto saxophone with Bill Frisell on guitar, Wayne Horvitz on keyboards, Fred Frith on bass, Joey Baron on drums, and Yamatsuka Eye on vocals. The group was established in 1988 as a "compositional workshop" to test the limitations of a rock band format.

The album consists of several covers of movie themes, one jazz standard, and original compositions by Zorn, including several "hardcore miniatures" which would later be compiled on the album Torture Garden. The project, especially on this album, was noted for wildly juxtaposing various musical genres in rapid succession.

The album's cover art features Weegee's 1940 photograph "Corpse With Revolver"; Weegee's 1945 book gave the band its name. Also featured are macabre illustrations by manga artist Maruo Suehiro.

== Release ==
The album was released by Elektra Nonesuch, which Zorn had previously released albums for; the subsequent releases of the Naked City group would be released on smaller labels like Shimmy Disc, and Zorn's own Tzadik and Avant labels.

The album was later rereleased as part of the box set Naked City: The Complete Studio Recordings on Tzadik Records in 2005.

== Reception ==
Professional ratings
Review scores
Source	Rating
AllMusic	5/5 stars
Rolling Stone	4/5 stars

The AllMusic review by Scott Yanow awarded the album 5 stars stating "The stimulating music rewards repeated listenings by more open-minded listeners."

Jon Pareles observed in The New York Times that "Mr. Zorn doesn't bother with transitions. While he and his musicians create every sudden textural shift themselves, without technological assistance, his guides are the splice, the jump cut, the video edit - not to mention the jack-in-the-box and its more sinister relatives in funhouses and horror movies. In his music, coherence is barely more than propinquity; one sound or style simply doesn't predict the next."

Christopher Thelen noted "While Naked City is certainly groundbreaking, it hardly is for everybody. The faint-hearted will be running for the exits before Zorn and crew can really get warmed up; purists of jazz, rock, and possibly even grindcore might consider the marriage of several styles of music sacrilegious. Possibly. But for the rest of us, Naked City represents unbridled energy, passion and possibly even anger channeled into music. The resulting noise is sheer joy to those who get it, and sheer madness to those who don't."

Pitchfork ranked this album at 47 on their Top 100 Albums of the 1980s list. Their review of The Complete Studio Recordings stated "On Naked City, Zorn introduced an amped-up surf/lounge/punk band featuring downtown New York's biggest talents, who blast and din through the 'James Bond' theme song, the theme to Chinatown, and a sound portrait of New Orleans' Latin Quarter – and then right when they slip into a groove, out of nowhere, the band launches punishing blasts of noise and catastrophe, flaming wreckage that blows up and collapses on a dime."

== Track listing ==
All compositions by John Zorn, unless otherwise noted.

No.	Title	Writer(s)	Length
1.	"Batman"		1:58
2.	"The Sicilian Clan"	Ennio Morricone	3:27
3.	"You Will Be Shot"		1:29
4.	"Latin Quarter"		4:05
5.	"A Shot in the Dark"	Henry Mancini	3:09
6.	"Reanimator"		1:34
7.	"Snagglepuss"		2:20
8.	"I Want to Live"	Johnny Mandel	2:08
9.	"Lonely Woman"	Ornette Coleman	2:38
10.	"Igneous Ejaculation"		0:20
11.	"Blood Duster"		0:13
12.	"Hammerhead"		0:08
13.	"Demon Sanctuary"		0:38
14.	"Obeah Man"		0:17
15.	"Ujaku"		0:27
16.	"Fuck the Facts"		0:11
17.	"Speedball"		0:37
18.	"Chinatown"	Jerry Goldsmith	4:23
19.	"Punk China Doll"		3:01
20.	"N.Y. Flat Top Box"		0:43
21.	"Saigon Pickup"		4:46
22.	"The James Bond Theme"	John Barry	3:02
23.	"Den of Sins"		1:08
24.	"Contempt"	Georges Delerue	2:49
25.	"Graveyard Shift"		3:25
26.	"Inside Straight"		4:10
Total length:			55:14

== Personnel ==
- John Zorn – alto saxophone
- Bill Frisell – guitar
- Fred Frith – bass
- Joey Baron – drums
- Wayne Horvitz – keyboards
- Yamatsuka Eye – vocals
