= Game piece (music) =

Concept in experimental music

Game piece is a concept of experimental music having its roots with composers Iannis Xenakis, Christian Wolff and John Zorn. Game pieces may be considered controlled improvisation. An essential characteristic is that there is no pre-arranged sequence of events. They unfold freely according to certain rules, like in a sports game. Therefore, game pieces have elements of improvisation. A number of methods can be used to determine the direction and evolution of the music, including hand gestures. Zorn's game piece "Cobra", which has been recorded several times for various labels, uses a combination of cards and gestures and can be performed by an ensemble of any size and composition. Zorn's game pieces, written in the late 1970s and mid-1980s, include Cobra, Hockey, Lacrosse, and Xu Feng.

As well as a sports game, a game piece may also be considered analogous to language: The performance is directed by a well-defined set of rules (a grammar) but by no means fixed or predetermined (just as all sentences generated by the same grammar are not the same). The length of a piece may be arbitrary, just as a sentence can be of any imaginable length while still conforming to a strictly defined syntax.

In Formalized Music (2001), Iannis Xenakis mentions two pieces in his oeuvre that utilize game theory: Duel (1959) and Stratégie (1962). The first of these, Duel, involves an orchestra that is broken into two groups, each with a separate conductor. Each conductor chooses from a palette of six modules, and points are assigned to each conductor based on the combinations of modules that occurred. Stratégie expands this process to a larger orchestra, and it simplifies the rules to make performance easier.

German experimental group Einsturzende Neubauten developed a 600 card game piece named Dave. Vocalist Blixa Bargeld describes the card game as "not too much of an aleatoric thing as it is a navigation system". Dave is used as an improvisational spur in live performance and was used extensively in the composing and recording of Alles in Allem.

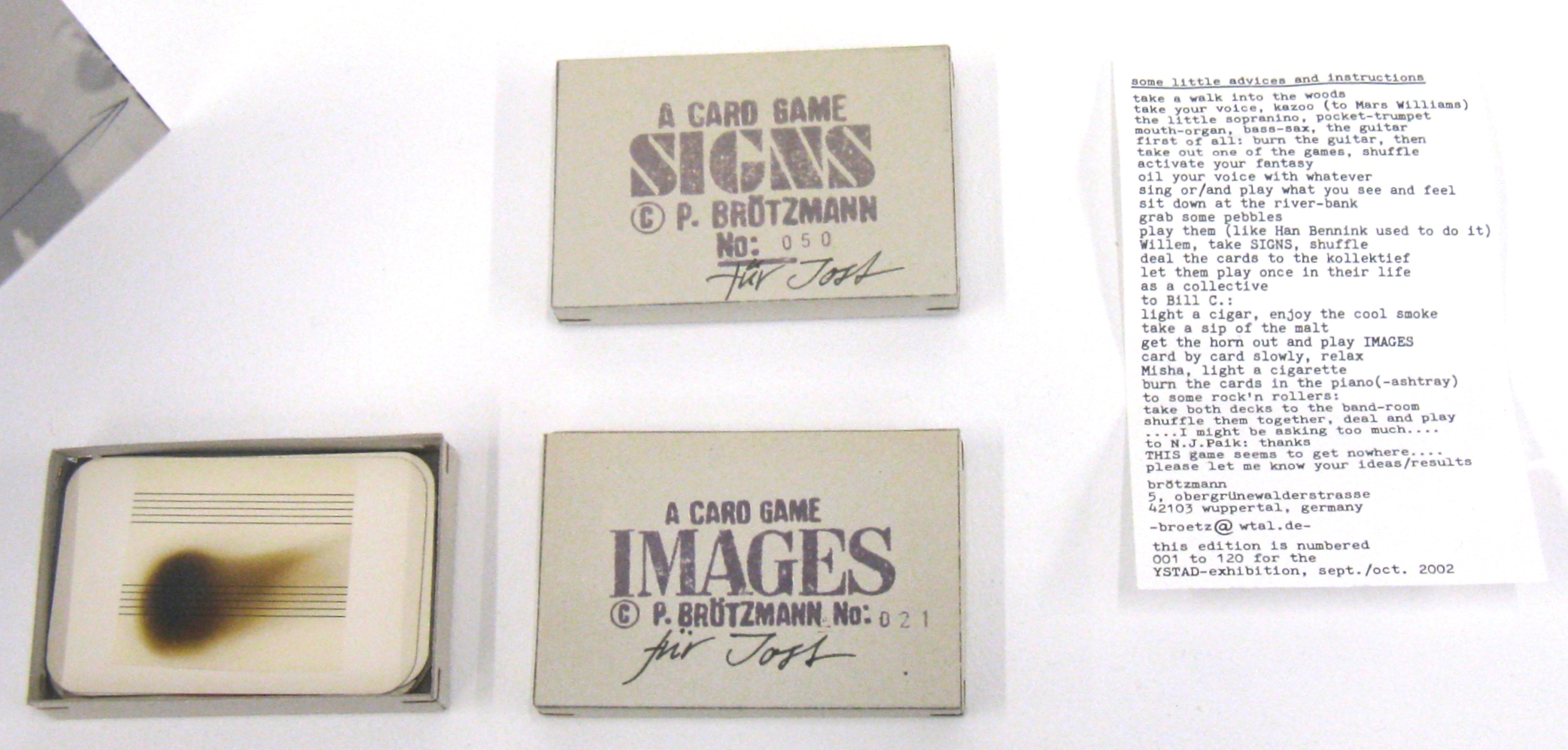
Brotzman's Signs and Images

Free jazz saxophonist Peter Brotzmann devised, designed and illustrated two card games, Signs and Images, in the early 2000s to be used by the Chicago Tentet. Signs consists of twenty-five cards and Images fifteen. The games were released by Brotzmann as a limited edition in 2002.
