= Marc Ribot discography =

This is a discography for guitarist Marc Ribot, including both his own albums and significant recordings to which he has contributed. The year in brackets indicates the date of first release.

== Albums ==
Year released	Title	Label	Notes
1990	Rootless Cosmopolitans	Island	
1992	Requiem for What's His Name	Les Disques du Crépuscule	with the Rootless Cosmopolitans
1993	Marc Ribot Plays Solo Guitar Works of Frantz Casseus	Les Disques du Crépuscule	solo guitar
1994	Shrek	Avant	
1994	Subsonic 1: Sounds of a Distant Episode	Sub Rosa/Subsonic	with Shrek
1995	The Book of Heads	Tzadik	composed by John Zorn
1995	Don't Blame Me	DIW	solo guitar
1997	Shoe String Symphonettes	Tzadik	film music (a.k.a. Soundtracks, Vol. 1)
1998	The Prosthetic Cubans	Atlantic	with Los Cubanos Postizos
1999	Yo! I Killed Your God	Tzadik	with Shrek
2000	Muy Divertido!	Atlantic	with Los Cubanos Postizos
2001	Saints	Atlantic	solo guitar
2001	Inasmuch as Life Is Borrowed	Ultima Vez	limited edition
2003	Scelsi Morning	Tzadik	
2003	Soundtracks Volume 2	Tzadik	film music
2005	Spiritual Unity	Pi	
2007	Asmodeus: Book of Angels Volume 7	Tzadik	composed by John Zorn
2008	Exercises in Futility	Tzadik	solo guitar
2008	Party Intellectuals	Pi	with Ceramic Dog
2010	Silent Movies	Pi	solo guitar
2013	Your Turn	Northern Spy	with Ceramic Dog
2014	Live at the Village Vanguard	Pi	with Henry Grimes and Chad Taylor
2015	The Young Philadelphians: Live in Tokyo	Yellowbird	with The Young Philadelphians
2018	YRU Still Here?	Northern Spy	with Ceramic Dog
2018	Songs of Resistance 1942-2018	Epitaph / Ada	
2020	What I Did on My Long Vacation	Northern Spy	with Ceramic Dog
2021	Hope	Northern Spy	with Ceramic Dog
2023	Connection	Yellowbird	with Ceramic Dog

== As sideman ==
With Noël Akchoté

- Lust Corner (Winter & Winter, 1997)

With Ambitious Lovers

- Lust (Elektra, 1991)

With the Anarchist Republic of Bzzz

- Anarchist Republic of Bzzz (Sub Rosa, 2009)

With Trey Anastasio

- Surrender to the Air (Elektra, 1996)

With Laurie Anderson

- Bright Red (Warner, 1994)
- Amelia (Nonesuch, 2024)

With Dick Annegarn

- Adieu Verdure (Tôt ou Tard/Warner, 1999)

With Aterciopelados

- Caribe Atómico (RCA International, 1998)

With Auktyon

- Girls Sing (2007)

With Susana Baca

- Eco de Sombras (Luaka Bop, 2000)
- Espíritu Vivo (Luaka Bop, 2002)
- Travesias (Luaka Bop, 2006)

With Eszter Balint

- Flicker (Scratchie/East West, 1999)

With Cyro Baptista

- Vira Loucos (Avant, 1997)
- Beat the Donkey (Tzadik, 2002)

With Sara Bareilles

- Amidst the Chaos (Epic, 2019)

With Barkmarket

- Easy Listening (Purge Sound League, 1989)
- Vegas Throat (Def American, 1992)

With Alain Bashung

- Chatterton (Barclay, 1994)
- L'Imprudence (Barclay, 2002)
- Bleu pétrole (Barclay, 2008)

With Badawi

- Safe (Asphodel, 2006)

With the Black Keys

- Attack & Release (Nonesuch/V2, 2008)

With Claus Boesser-Ferrari

- How We Became Americans (Acoustic Music, 2009)

With Richard Buckner

- Devotion + Doubt (MCA, 1997)

With Solomon Burke

- Soul Alive (Rounder, 1984)

With Robert Burger

- City of Strangers (Tzadik, 2008)

With T Bone Burnett

- The Criminal Under My Own Hat (Columbia, 1992)
- The True False Identity (Columbia, 2006)
- Tooth of Crime (Nonesuch, 2008)

With Andrés Calamaro

- Alta Suciedad (Gasa/Warner, 1997)
- Honestidad Brutal (WEA, 1999)

With Vinicius Cantuária

- Vinicius (Transparent Music, 2001)
- Cymbals (Naïve, 2007)

With Vinicio Capossela

- Il Ballo di San Vito (CDG/East West, 1996)
- Canzoni a manovella (2000)
- Ovunque proteggi (2006)
- La nave sta arrivando (2011)
- Marinai, profeti e balene (2011)
- Rebetiko gymnastas (2012)

With Marco Cappelli

- IDR (Italian Doc Remix) (Itinera, 2008)

With Lori Carson

- Shelter (DGC, 1990) produced by Hal Willner

With James Carter

- Layin' the Cut (Atlantic, 2000)

With Charming Hostess

- The Bowls Project (Tzadik, 2009)

With Chocolate Genius

- Black Music (V2, 1998)
- GodMusic (V2, 2001)
- Black Yankee Rock (Commotion, 2005)

With Shemekia Copeland

- Never Going Back (Telarc, 2008)

With Cibo Matto

- Viva! La Woman (Warner, 1996)
- Super Relax (Warner, 1997)
- Stereo * Type A (Warner, 1999)

With Club d'Elf

- Live at Tonic (Kufala, 2005)

With Paula Cole

- Ithaca (Decca, 2010)

With Anthony Coleman

- With Every Breath: The Music of Shabbat at BJ (Knitting Factory, 1999)

With Gal Costa

- O Sorriso do Gato de Alice (BMG/RCA, 1993)

With Elvis Costello

- Spike (Warner, 1989)
- Mighty Like a Rose (Warner, 1991)
- Kojak Variety (Warner, 1995)

With Corin Curschellas

- Valdun Voices of Rumantsch (Migros Genossenschaftsbund, 1997)

With Dead Combo

- Lisboa Mulata (Dead & Company, 2011)

With Devine & Stratton

- Cardiffians (Les Disques du Crepuscule (Belgium), 1990)

With DJ Logic

- Project Logic (Ropeadope, 1999)

With Dave Douglas

- Freak In (Bluebird/RCA Victor, 2003)

With the Lucien Dubuis Trio

- Ultime Cosmos (Enja, 2009)

With Marty Ehrlich's Dark Woods Ensemble

- Sojourn (Tzadik, 1999)

With Elysian Fields

- Elysian Fields (Radioactive, 1996)

With Carol Emanuel

- Tops of Trees (Evva, 1995)

With Mikel Erentxun

- El Abrazo del Erizo (WEA Latina, 1996)

With Ellery Eskelin

- The Sun Died (Soul Note, 1996)
- Ten (Hat Hut, 2004)

With Evan and Jaron

- Evan and Jaron (Columbia, 2000)

With Marianne Faithfull

- Blazing Away (Island, 1990) produced by Hal Willner
- Easy Come, Easy Go (Naïve, 2008) produced by Hal Willner

With Jeff Finlin

- Original Fin (NBFNY, 1999)

With Flaming Hoops

- Flaming Hoops (Newsic (Japan), 1989)

With Foetus

- Gash (Sony/Columbia, 1995)
- Null/Void (Cleopatra, 1997)

With Gavin Friday & The Man Seezer

- Each Man Kills the Thing He Loves (Island, 1989) produced by Hal Willner

With Richard Hell & The Voidoids

- Destiny Street Repaired (Insound, 2009)

With Sue Garner

- Shadyside (Thrill Jockey, 2002)

With Allen Ginsberg

- The Lion for Real (Great Jones/Island, 1989) produced by Hal Willner
- The Ballad of the Skeletons (Mercury, 1996) produced by Hal Willner
- Wichita Vortex Sutra (Artemis, 2004)

With Ely Guerra

- Lotofire (Higher Octave, 2002)

With Joe Henry

- "Guilty by Association" on Sweet Relief II: Gravity of the Situation (The Songs of Vic Chesnutt) with Madonna (Columbia, 1996)
- Scar (Mammoth, 2001)
- Blood from Stars (Anti-, 2009)
- Reverie (Anti-, 2011)

With Naif Herin

- Faites du bruit (2010)

With Yuka Honda

- Eucademix (Tzadik, 2004)

With The Jazz Passengers

- Broken Night, Red Light (Les Disques du Crepuscule, 1987)
- Deranged and Decomposed (Crepuscule, 1988)
- Live at the Knitting Factory Vol. 1 (A&M, 1989) - 2 tracks
- Implement Yourself (New World/CounterCurrents, 1990)
- In Love (High Street, 1994)
- Cross the Street (Crepuscule, 1995)
- Individually Twisted (32, 1996)

With Elton John and Leon Russell

- The Union (Decca/Mercury, 2010) produced by T Bone Burnett

With Freedy Johnston

- This Perfect World (Elektra, 1994)

With Norah Jones

- The Fall (Blue Note, 2009)

With Hoppy Kamiyama

- King of Music (Toshiba-EMI (Japan), 1991)
- Welcome to Forbidden Paridise (Toshiba-EMI (Japan), 1992)
- Optical*8 (God Mountain (Japan), 1992)
- Groovallegience (Toshiba-EMI (Japan), 1996)

With Mory Kanté

- Nongo Village (Barclay (France), 1993)

With The Klezmatics

- Jews with Horns (Xenophile, 1995)

With Makigami Koichi

- Koroshi No Blues (Toshiba-EMI Japan, 1993)

With Diana Krall

- Glad Rag Doll (Verve, 2012)
- Turn Up the Quiet (Verve, 2017)
- This Dream of You (Verve, 2020)

With Mary La Rose

- The Blue Guitar (Little Music, 2006)

With The Latebirds

- Fortune Cookies (Grandpop, 2003)

With Gina Leishman

- Bed Time (GCQ, 2004)
- In My Skin (GCQ, 2007)

With Arto Lindsay

- O Corpo Sutil (The Subtle Body) (Rykodisc, 1996)
- Mundo Civilizado (Rykodisc, 1996)

With David Linx

- L'Instant d'après (Polygram International, 2001)

With Frank London

- The Shvitz (Knitting Factory, 1993)

With the Lounge Lizards

- Big Heart: Live in Tokyo (Antilles, 1986)
- No Pain for Cakes (Antilles, 1987)
- Voice of Chunk (Lagarto, 1989)

With Allen Lowe

- Jews in Hell (Spaceout, 2007)

With Evan Lurie

- Kizu (CBS/Sony, 1988) with Yoshitada Minami
- Pieces for Bandoneon (Les Disques du Crepuscule, 1989)
- Selling Water by the Side of the River (Antilles, 1990)
- Il Piccolo Diavolo (Ciak (Italy), 1991)
- How I Spent My Vacation (Tzadik, 1998)

With John Lurie

- Down by Law Soundtrack (Crammed Discs, 1987)
- African Swim and Mannie & Lo (Strange & Beautiful Music, 1998)

With Giovanni Maier

- Giovanni Maier Technicolor/A Turtle Soup (Long Song, 2008)

With Kirsty McGee

- Those Old Demons (Hobopop, 2014)

With Maria McKee

- Maria McKee (Geffen Goldline, 1989)

With Medeski Martin & Wood

- It's a Jungle in Here (Gramavision, 1993)
- The Dropper (Blue Note, 2000)
- End of the World Party (Just in Case) (Blue Note, 2004)

With John Mellencamp

- No Better Than This (Rounder, 2010)

With Tift Merritt

- Traveling Alone (Yep, 2012)
- Stitch of the World (Yep, 2017)

With Jun Miyake

- Hoshi No Tama No O (Entropathy) (Sony (Japan), 1993)

With Marisa Monte

- Mais (World Pacific, 1991)
- Memórias, Crônicas, e Declaracões de Amor (EMI, 2000)

With Ikue Mori

- Painted Desert (Avant, 1995)

With Sarah Jane Morris

- Fallen Angel (Irma, 1998)
- August (Fallen Angel/Indigo, 2002)

With Jean-Louis Murat

- Mustango (Labels/Virgin, 1999)

With Youn Sun Nah

- She Moves On (ACT, 2017)

With Roy Nathanson

- Lobster & Friend (Knitting Factory, 1993) with Anthony Coleman
- I Could've Been a Drum (Tzadik, 1997) with Anthony Coleman
- Fire at Keaton's Bar & Grill (Six Degrees, 2000)

With Steve Nieve

- Welcome to the Voice (Deutsche Grammophon, 2007)

With Sean Noonan Brewed by Noon

- Stoies to Tell (Songlines, 2007)
- Live from New York and Beyond... (Innova, 2008)
- Boxing Dreams (Songlines, 2008)

With Seigen Ono

- Comme des Garcons, Vol. 2 (Venture/Virgin, 1989)
- Forty Days and Forty Nights (Kitty/Saidera, 1991)
- Maria & Maria (Saidera, 2001)

With Yoko Ono

- Warzone (Sony, 2018)

With Beth Orton

- Sugaring Season (Anti-, 2012)

With Mike Patton

- Pranzo Oltranzista (Tzadik, 1997)

With Madeleine Peyroux

- Dreamland (Atlantic, 1996)
- Standing on the Rooftop (Decca, 2011)

With Philadelphy's Paint

- Paint: Tap the Ethereal (Extraplatte, 2005)

With Sam Phillips

- Cruel Inventions (Virgin, 1991)
- Martinis and Bikinis (Virgin, 1994), produced by T Bone Burnett
- Omnipop (It's Only a Flesh Wound Lambchop) (Virgin, 1996)
- Fan Dance (Nonesuch, 2001)
- A Boot and a Shoe (Nonesuch, 2004)

With Pissuk Rachav

- Eretz Hakodesh (Tzadik, 2009)

With Robert Plant & Alison Krauss

- Raising Sand (Rounder, 2007)

With David Poe

- David Poe (ulfTone Music, 2001)

With Jim Pugliese

- Jim Pugliese's Save III: Live @ Issue Project Room NYC (Improvvisatore Involontario, 2008)

With Greg Ribot and The International Conspiracy

- Cumbia del Norte (Cathexis, 1999)

With Stan Ridgway

- Mosquitos (Geffen, 1989)

With Jon Rose

- Techno mit Störungen (Plag Dich Nicht, 1998)

With Rough Assemblage

- Construction & Demolition (Avant (Japan), 1995)

With David Sanborn

- Another Hand (Elektra, 1991) produced by Hal Willner

With Boris Savoldelli

- Insanology (BTF, 2008)

With 17 Hippies

- 17 Hippies Play Guitar (Hipster, 2006)

With David Shea

- Prisoner (Sub Rosa, 1994)
- Hsi-Yu Chi (Tzadik, 1995)

With Harry Shearer

- It Must Have Been Something I Said (Rhino, 1994)

With Howard Shore

- The Departed (Original Score) (Watertower, 2006)

With Sion

- Spring, Summer, Fall and Winter (1987)
- I Don't Like Myself (Baidis (Japan), 1993)

With Slut

- Slut (God Mountain (Japan), 1993)

With Wadada Leo Smith

- Lake Biwa (Tzadik, 2004)

With Luísa Sobral

- Luísa (Universal Portugal, 2016), produced by Joe Henry

With Tim Sparks

- At the Rebbe's Table (Tzadik, 2002)

With Shelby Starner

- From in the Shadows (Warner Bros., 1999)

With Syd Straw

- Surprise (Virgin, 1989)

With The Surfers

- Songs from the Pipe (Epic, 1998)

With David Sylvian

- Dead Bees on a Cake (Virgin, 1999)

With Third Person

- The Bends (Knitting Factory, 1991)
- Hallelujah, Anyway – Remembering Tom Cora (Tzadik, 1999)

With Teddy Thompson

- Upfront & Down Low (Verve, 2007)

With Tanita Tikaram

- Ancient Heart (Warner Bros., 1988)

With Marco Tiraboschi

- In a new world (Da Vinci Publishing 2024)

With Allen Toussaint

- The Bright Mississippi (Nonesuch, 2009)

With Tricky

- Angels with Dirty Faces (Island, 1998)

With McCoy Tyner

- Guitars (McCoy Tyner/Half Note, 2008)

With Kazutoki Umezu

- Eclecticism (Knitting Factory, 1994)
- First Deserter (Knitting Factory, 1997)

With Silvain Vanot

- Sur des Arbres (Virgin (France), 1995)

With Caetano Veloso

- Estrangeiro (Elektra/Musician, 1989)

With Tom Waits

- Rain Dogs (Island, 1985)
- Franks Wild Years (Island, 1987)
- Mule Variations (Anti-/Epitaph, 1999)
- Real Gone (Anti-/Epitaph, 2004)
- Bad as Me (Anti-, 2011)

With Bill Ware

- This Is No Time (Eightball, 1997) with Groove Thing
- Sir Duke (Knitting Factory, 2001)

With Rob Wasserman

- Trios (MCA/GRP, 1994)

With Sanda Weigl

- Gypsy Killer (Knitting Factory, 2002)

With Hal Willner

- Weird Nightmare (Meditations on Mingus) (Columbia, 1992)
- AngelHeaded Hipster: The Songs of Marc Bolan & T. Rex (BMG, 2020) with Joan Jett, Lucinda Williams, Beth Orton, King Khan, Sean Lennon & Charlotte Kemp Muhl and David Johansen

With Cassandra Wilson

- Thunderbird (Blue Note, 2006)

With Norman Yamada

- Being and Time (Tzadik, 1998)

With Akiko Yano

- Akiko (Tabi, 2009)

With Zakarya

- 413 A (Tzadik, 2006)

With Hector Zazou

- Chansons des mers froides (Columbia, 1994)
- Made on Earth (Crammed Disc, 1997) with Barbara Gogan
- Las Vegas Is Cursed (First World, 2001) with Sandy Dillon

With Amir Ziv's Kotkot

- Alive at Tonic (Mai Nya Neem, 2008)

With John Zorn

- Filmworks VII: Cynical Hysterie Hour (CBS/Sony (Japan), 1989)
- Kristallnacht (Eva, 1993)
- John Zorn's Cobra: Live at the Knitting Factory (Knitting Factory, 1995)
- Filmworks II: Music for an Untitled Film by Walter Hill (Toy's Factory, 1995)
- Filmworks III: 1990-1995 (Toy's Factory, 1996)
- Bar Kokhba (Tzadik, 1996)
- Filmworks V: Tears of Ecstasy (Tzadik, 1996)
- Filmworks VI: 1996 (Tzadik, 1996)
- Filmworks IV: S&M + More (Tzadik, 1997)
- Filmworks VIII: 1997 (Tzadik, 1998)
- The Circle Maker (Tzadik, 1997) with Bar Kokhba
- Music for Children (Tzadik, 1998)
- Taboo & Exile (Tzadik, 1999)
- The Big Gundown 15th Anniversary Edition (Tzadik, 2000)
- The Gift (Tzadik, 2000)
- Filmworks XII: Three Documentaries (Tzadik, 2002)
- Filmworks XIII: Invitation to a Suicide (Tzadik, 2002)
- Filmworks XIV: Hiding and Seeking (2003)
- Masada Guitars (Tzadik, 2003) solo performances by Marc Ribot, Tim Sparks and Bill Frisell
- 50th Birthday Celebration Volume 4 (Tzadik, 2004) with Electric Masada
- 50th Birthday Celebration Volume 11 (Tzadik, 2005) with Bar Kokhba Sextet
- Masada Rock (Tzadik, 2005) with Rashanim
- Electric Masada: At the Mountains of Madness (Tzadik, 2005) with Electric Masada
- Filmworks XVIII: The Treatment (Tzadik, 2006)
- The Dreamers (Tzadik, 2008) with The Dreamers
- The Crucible (Tzadik, 2008) with Moonchild
- O'o (Tzadik, 2009) with The Dreamers
- Ipos: Book of Angels Volume 14 (Tzadik, 2010) with The Dreamers
- Enigmata (2011) with Trevor Dunn
- A Dreamers Christmas (Tzadik, 2011) with The Dreamers
- Valentine’s Day (Tzadik, 2014) with Trevor Dunn and Tyshawn Sorey
- Pellucidar: A Dreamers Fantabula (Tzadik, 2015) with The Dreamers
- The True Discoveries of Witches and Demons (Tzadik, 2015) with Simulacrum and Trevor Dunn
