= Redbird (John Zorn album) =

Studio album by John Zorn
- Released: September 19, 1995
- Recorded: 1995
- Genre: Avant-garde, contemporary classical music
- Length: 49:52
- Label: Tzadik TZ 7008
- Producer: John Zorn

John Zorn chronology
First Recordings 1973 (1995)	Redbird (1995)	Nani Nani (1995)

Redbird is an album of contemporary classical music by American composer and saxophonist/multi-instrumentalist John Zorn consisting of two tribute compositions for artist Agnes Martin.

== Reception ==
The Allmusic review by Satcia Proefrock awarded the album 4 stars stating "Redbird captures that sense in music and, in its continuity, becomes one of Zorn's most effective tributes. As always, Zorn has managed to collect a group of extremely talented musicians, and their execution of this album makes it even more perfect".

Professional ratings
Review scores
Source	Rating
Allmusic	4/5 stars

== Track listing ==
All compositions by John Zorn

1. "Dark River" - 8:51
2. "Redbird" - 41:01

== Personnel ==
- Jim Pugliese – bass drums, percussion
- Carol Emanuel – harp (track 2)
- Erik Friedlander – cello (track 2)
- Jill Jaffe – viola (track 2)
- John Zorn – conductor
