= Locus Solus (album) =

Studio album by John Zorn
- Released: 1983 (re-released 1990 and 1997)
- Recorded: 1983
- Genre: Avant-garde, jazz, classical
- Length: 68:37
- Label: Rift, Eva/Wave, Tzadik
- Producer: John Zorn

John Zorn chronology
Archery (1982)	Locus Solus (1983)	Yankees (1983)

Original Rift Records Cover

Locus Solus is an album of improvisations by John Zorn and other musicians. Originally released as a double vinyl album on Rift records in 1983 it was re-released as a CD with additional tracks on Eva/Wave in 1990 and on Zorn's Tzadik Records label in 1997.

== Reception ==
Professional ratings
Review scores
Source	Rating
AllMusic	3/5 stars
The Penguin Guide to Jazz	3.5/4 stars
Spin Alternative Record Guide	8/10

The AllMusic review by Joslyn Layne stated: "This captures over an hour's worth of John Zorn's search for the improvised song form.... Overall, an album of short, angular, experimental energy tracks."

The Penguin Guide to Jazz observed: "This is one of the sacred texts of '80s New York improv, a fierce scrabbly set of associations that draw heavily on the power trio aesthetic of bands like Husker Dü... It's impressively compact but sometime rather abrupt".

== Track listing ==
No.	Title	Length
1.	"Bass and the Treble"	2:57
2.	"Acquisition and Control of Fire"	1:33
3.	"Honey-Cab"	2:33
4.	"Switch"	2:15
5.	"Juan Talks It Out of His System"	2:11
6.	"The Wish"	2:02
7.	"A Case Arose"	2:00
8.	"The Elf"	1:41
9.	"Getting Curly"	1:51
10.	"Don't Switch"	1:50
11.	"Smooth Cheeks of a Big Ego"	1:51
12.	"Add Water"	2:15
13.	"Cold"	1:31
14.	"Friar T."	0:58
15.	"Too Me"	2:16
16.	"You Rang?"	1:17
17.	"Self-Satisfied"	1:22
18.	"Agora"	1:10
19.	"Dot, Dot, Dot"	1:14
20.	"Moi Non Plus"	1:43
21.	"Liver"	1:49
22.	"The Footman's Eyes Get Crossed"	1:04
23.	"Heike Cipher Mystery"	1:47
24.	"Jedi Mind Trick"	1:06
25.	"Mysterious Island"	2:11
26.	"You Only Live Twice, Mr. Bond"	1:59
27.	"When Arrows Meet"	1:38
28.	"Never Say Never Again"	1:45
29.	"Sign of the Four"	2:13
30.	"Locus Solus, Pt. 1–2"	2:11
31.	"Where Are My Victims?"	2:06
32.	"Disco Volante"	2:06
33.	"Kaiser in Borneo"	1:48
34.	"The Saint"	1:40
35.	"The Violent Death of Dutch Schultz"	1:23
36.	"Thunderball"	1:43
37.	"White Zombie"	1:30
38.	"The Slaves of Vesuvius"	2:05

Note: (16,18,20,22) are extra tracks not available on the LP pressing.

== Personnel ==
- John Zorn – alto and soprano saxophones, game calls, B♭ clarinet
- Christian Marclay – turntables (tracks 1–9)
- Peter Blegvad – vocals (tracks 1–9)
- Arto Lindsay – guitar, vocals (tracks 10–22)
- Anton Fier – drums (tracks 10–15)
- M. E. Miller – drums (tracks 16–22, 31–38)
- Ikue Mori – drums (tracks 23–30)
- Wayne Horvitz – keyboards (tracks 23–30)
- Whiz Kid – turntables (tracks 31–38)
