= The Prosthetic Cubans =

Studio album by Marc Ribot
- Released: June 16, 1998
- Recorded: 1998
- Studio: Water Music, Hoboken, New Jersey
- Genre: Latin jazz, jazz fusion, world fusion
- Length: 46:41
- Label: Atlantic
- Producer: JD Foster

Marc Ribot chronology
Shoe String Symphonettes (1997)	The Prosthetic Cubans (1998)	Yo! I Killed Your God (1999)

The Prosthetic Cubans is a studio album recorded in New York City by Marc Ribot with Los Cubanos Postizos and features compositions by Arsenio Rodríguez. It was the first album by The Prosthetic Cubans and was followed by ¡Muy Divertido! in 2000.

== Reception ==
Professional ratings
Review scores
Source	Rating
Allmusic	4/5 stars

The Allmusic review by Marc Gilman awarded the album 4 stars, stating, "The mastery and vision of the enduring Marc Ribot shine through on this release... it is an excellent album".

The Miami New Times' Michael Roberts noted, "Postizos doesn't so much reproduce Rodriguez's music as it reimagines it from a decidedly avant-garde perspective".

On The A.V. Club Joshua Klein wrote, "The record is about as authentic as any of Ribot's other stylistic excursions, but it's far more straight-faced and therefore decidedly respectable".

Variety's Phil Gallo said, "Atlantic stands to do well with the disc as Cuban styles, particularly the son, are being embraced on these shores. 'Cubanos Postizos,' which translates to 'Prosthetic Cubans', is more homage than reproduction, embraceable for listeners regardless of which side of the Latin-American fence they're coming from. More so than his other albums, the disc is accessible from start to finish".

== Track listing ==
1. "Aurora en Pekín" (Alfredo Boloña) – 5:31
2. "Aquí Como Allá" (Arsenio Rodríguez) – 4:51
3. "Como Se Goza en el Barrio" (Rodríguez) – 3:29
4. "Postizo" (Marc Ribot) – 4:55
5. "No Me Llores Más" (Luis Martinez Griñán) – 5:39
6. "Los Teenagers Bailan Changui" (Rodríguez) – 4:49
7. "Fiesta en el Solar" (Rodríguez) – 5:05
8. "La Vida Es un Sueño" (Rodríguez) – 3:30
9. "Esclavo Tristé" (Rodríguez) – 6:06
10. "Choserito Plena" (Inacio Ríos) – 2:46

== Personnel ==
- Marc Ribot – guitar, trumpet, vocals
- Brad Jones (all but (10)) – bass
- EJ Rodriguez – percussion, vocals
- Robert J. Rodriguez (all but (6)) – claves, drums, percussion, vocals
- John Medeski (2,4,5,8) – organ, Mellotron
- Anthony Coleman (3,6) – organ
- Madeline Hunt-Ehrlich (4) – vocals
- Mattan Ingram (4) – vocals
- Miles Ingram (4) – vocals
- Gregory Ribot (10) – baritone saxophone
- JD Foster- producer
