= Nani Nani =

Studio album by John Zorn & Yamantaka Eye
- Released: October 1995
- Recorded: April 17–18, 1995
- Genre: Avant-garde
- Length: 41:38
- Label: Tzadik TZ 7206
- Producer: John Zorn

John Zorn chronology
| Redbird (1995) | Nani Nani (1995) | The Book of Heads (1995) |

John Zorn and Yamataka Eye chronology
| Nani Nani (1995) | Zohar (1995) |

Nani Nani is an album of improvised music by American composer and saxophonist/multi-instrumentalist John Zorn (as Dekoboko Hajime) and Yamataka Eye. A sequel album Naninani II was released in 2004.

== Reception ==
The Allmusic review by Stacia Proefrock awarded the album 4 stars stating "This album is not for Sunday afternoon relaxation, but its obvious playfulness make its more discordant elements eminently tolerable, even amusing in their cleverness".

Professional ratings
Review scores
| Source | Rating |
|---|---|
| Allmusic | 4/5 stars |

== Track listing ==
1. "Eep Man" - 1:07
2. "Test Tube" - 3:11
3. "Thank You For Not Thinking" - 2:36
4. "Pulp Wars" - 2:57
5. "Sticky Beethoven's Pipeline" - 1:15
6. "Laughing Eskimo" - 1:28
7. "Damascus" - 1:11
8. "Yoga Dollar" - 5:17
9. "Propolution" - 1:36
10. "My Rainbow Life" - 1:44
11. "Bad Hawkwind" - 18:13
12. "We Live" - 0:56
- All compositions by John Zorn & Yamataka Eye

== Personnel ==
- Yamataka Eye - Vocals, Drums, Toys
- John Zorn - Saxophone, Harmonica, Guitar, Sitar, Sampler
