= Asmodeus: Book of Angels Volume 7 =

Studio album by Marc Ribot
- Released: June 26, 2007
- Genre: Avant-garde jazz, klezmer, hard rock
- Length: 38:30
- Label: Tzadik
- Producer: John Zorn

Book of Angels chronology
Moloch: Book of Angels Volume 6 (2006)	Asmodeus: Book of Angels Volume 7 (2007)	Volac: Book of Angels Volume 8 (2007)

Marc Ribot chronology
Spiritual Unity (2005)	Asmodeus: Book of Angels Volume 7 (2007)	Exercises in Futility (2008)

Asmodeus: Book of Angels Volume 7 is an album by Marc Ribot performing compositions from John Zorn's second Masada book, The Book of Angels.

== Reception ==
Professional ratings
Review scores
Source	Rating
Allmusic	4.5/5 stars

The Allmusic review by awarded the album 4½ stars, stating, "On this thrilling, amped-up outing, six-string wizard Marc Ribot plays the compositions of John Zorn with beautiful intensity... The ghosts of Jimi Hendrix and Sonny Sharrock hover in Ribot's playing here: this is ensemble avant-rock made for and by the courageous".

Writing for All About Jazz, Troy Collins commented, "Asmodeus: The Book of Angels, Volume 7 is the most visceral exploration of the Masada songbook yet... A high water mark in a developing series, Asmodeus sets the bar higher for future interpretations of this rich body of work".

== Track listing ==
All compositions by John Zorn

1. "Kalmiya" – 4:41
2. "Yezriel" – 7:26
3. "Kezef" – 2:32
4. "Mufgar" – 2:58
5. "Armaros" – 4:52
6. "Cabriel" – 2:00
7. "Zakun" – 3:38
8. "Raziel" – 2:24
9. "Dagiel" – 3:22
10. "Sensenya" – 4:37

== Personnel ==
- Marc Ribot – guitar
- Trevor Dunn – bass
- G. Calvin Weston – drums
- John Zorn – composer, conductor
