= The Classic Guide to Strategy =

Compilation album by John Zorn
- Released: 1983 (Vol. 1); 1986 (Vol. 2); 1996 (Compilation)
- Recorded: Recorded at the OAO Studio in Brooklyn, New York on February 27, 1983 (Vol. 1); Radio City Studios, New York City on July 30 & September 9, 1985
- Genre: Avant-garde
- Length: 77:57
- Label: Lumina; Tzadik (Compilation)
- Producer: John Zorn, Ned Rothenberg (Vol. 2)

John Zorn chronology
Yankees (1983)	The Classic Guide to Strategy (1983)	Ganryu Island (1985)

Original Volume 2 Cover

The Classic Guide to Strategy is a compilation album by John Zorn featuring his two early solo records The Classic Guide to Strategy Volume One (1983), (tracks 1–2) and the Classic Guide to Strategy Volume Two (1986), (tracks 3–8). The albums were first released on vinyl on Lumina Records in and later re-released on Tzadik Records in 1996 as a single CD. The second track is inspired by the work of Carl Stalling and tracks 3–8 are named after avant-garde Japanese artists. The Classic Guide to Strategy Volume Two also contained the track "Yano Akiko" (5:20) which does not appear on the CD re-release.

The cover art from Volumes One and Two are the kanji characters for "earth" and "water", respectively, which relate to the first volumes of The Book of Five Rings written by Miyamoto Musashi.

The third volume of The Classic Guide to Strategy was released as part of Zorn's Birthday Celebration Series subtitled The Fire Book in 2003 and fourth, The Wind Book in 2016.

== Reception ==
Professional ratings
Review scores
Source	Rating
Allmusic	3/5 stars
The Penguin Guide to Jazz	3/4 stars

The Allmusic review by Stacia Proefrock states "when a line is drawn through Zorn's previous work, it ends up here -- the playfulness of sound, the variety of textures, the use of silence and space as part of the composition -- if the listener approaches this album expecting to find musical genius, he or she will not have to look too far".

The Penguin Guide to Jazz observed "This surviving torso of a much larger project serves notice of what an inventive saxophone player Zorn is... This is emphatically a jazz record".

== Track listing ==
All compositions by John Zorn

1. "Part 1" a.k.a. "Senki (War Spirit)" - 19:36
2. "Part 2 (Cartoon Music)" a.k.a. "The Moon In The Cold Stream Like A Mirror" - 19:32
3. "Aoyanian Michi" - 11:15
4. "Enoken" - 3:21
5. "Katsumi Shigeru" - 6:34
6. "Kondo Toshinori" - 6:04
7. "Togawa Jun" - 8:54
8. "Mori Ikue" - 2:38

- Recorded at the OAO Studio in Brooklyn, New York on February 27, 1983 (tracks 1 & 2), and at Radio City Studios, New York City on July 30, 1985 (tracks 3–5) and September 19, 1985 (tracks 6–8)

== Personnel ==
- John Zorn - Alto and Soprano Saxophones, Bb Clarinet, Olt, Weems and Greenhead Game Calls, E-flat Clarinet
- Martin Bisi - Recording Engineer (1–2)
- Don Hünerberg - Recording Engineer (3–8)
