= 50th Birthday Celebration Volume 10 =

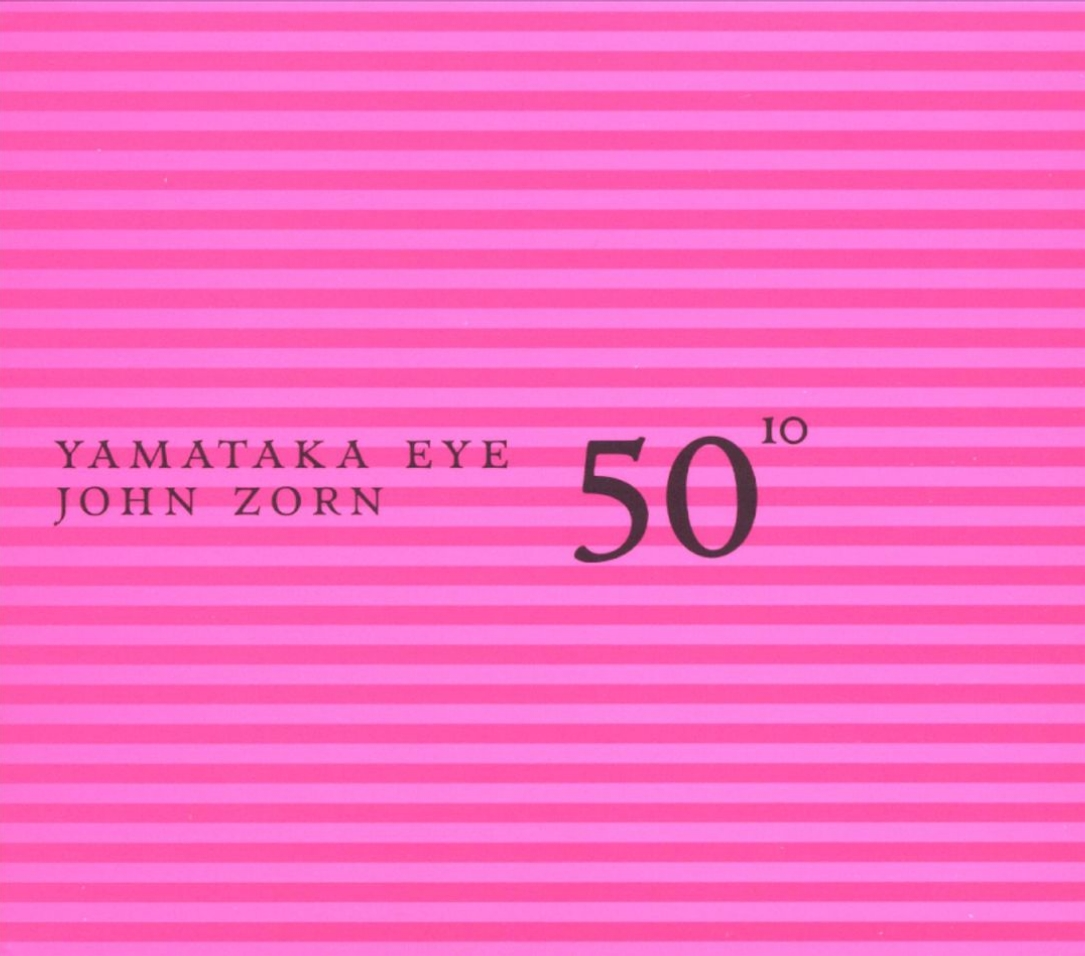

Live album by John Zorn and Yamataka Eye
- Released: January 25, 2005
- Recorded: September 15, 2003
- Genre: Downtown music Avant-garde jazz
- Length: 44:21
- Label: Tzadik TZ 5010
- Producer: John Zorn

John Zorn chronology
50th Birthday Celebration Volume 9 (2004)	50th Birthday Celebration Volume 10 (2005)	Rituals (2005)

John Zorn and Yamataka Eye chronology
Naninani II (2004)	50th Birthday Celebration Volume 10 (2005)

Professional ratings
Review scores
Source	Rating
Allmusic	3.5/5 stars
Pitchfork Media	7.1/10
The Penguin Guide to Jazz Recordings	3.5/4 stars

50th Birthday Celebration Volume 10 is a live album of improvised music by Yamataka Eye and John Zorn documenting their performance at Tonic in September 2003 as part of John Zorn's month-long 50th Birthday Celebration concert series. Guitarist Fred Frith also appears on one track.

== Reception ==
The Allmusic listing rated the album 3½ stars. Pitchfork reviewer Cameron Macdonald gave the album 7.1 out of 10 stating "Listening to their new work was masochistic for me. High-pitched tones disturb me, and Zorn cleared my sinuses with one of the more horrific squeals caught live on tape in the 50th Birthday closer."

The authors of The Penguin Guide to Jazz called the album "mysterious", and wrote: "credit should be given to technician Sawai Taeji, who does quite extraordinary things with Eye's electronics: we have never heard a performance quite like it, and it is nothing like the screamfest which might have been expected."

== Track listing ==
All tracks are written by John Zorn/Yamataka Eye.

No.	Title	Length
1.	"Postiviva"	9:30
2.	"M.S.T.G.L. (Moneysextripgodlove)"	6:44
3.	"Big Muff Dive"	8:28
4.	"Microwaveable Empty Highway"	5:13
5.	"Sun See Soon"	9:21
6.	"Choronzone"	7:36

== Personnel ==
- John Zorn – alto saxophone
- Yamataka Eye – voice, electronics
- Fred Frith – guitar (track 5)
- Sawai Taeji – technician
