= Yankees (album) =

Studio album by Derek Bailey, John Zorn & George Lewis
- Released: 1983
- Venues: OAO Studio, Brooklyn
- Genre: Avant-garde jazz
- Length: 44:21
- Label: Celluloid
- Producers: Derek Bailey, John Zorn

John Zorn chronology
| Locus Solus (1983) | Yankees (1983) | The Classic Guide to Strategy (1983) |

Yankees is an album of improvised music by Derek Bailey, John Zorn, and George Lewis. The album was released as an LP by Celluloid in 1983 and was reissued on CD by Celluloid (from a vinyl source) and Charly (from the original master tape). It was the first recorded meeting of John Zorn and Derek Bailey. The two men would later release the album, Harras, with William Parker in 1993. Zorn and Lewis would collaborate further on News for Lulu (1988) and More News for Lulu (1993) with Bill Frisell.

== Reception ==
Professional ratings
Review scores
| Source | Rating |
|---|---|
| AllMusic | 4/5 stars |
| The Penguin Guide to Jazz | 3.5/4 stars |

The AllMusic review by "Blue" Gene Tyranny awarded the album four stars, calling it "Subtle, droll, hilarious takes on the trivia of baseball sounds".

The Penguin Guide to Jazz observed: "Though a collaborative effort, this more and more feels like a Zorn project. It is one of the great improvisation records of the decade and is a key item in what turned out to be a vintage year... A record to cherish".

== Track listing ==
All compositions by Bailey/Lewis/Zorn

1. "City, City, City" – 8:29
2. "The Legend of Enos Slaughter" – 9:27
3. "Who's on First?" – 3:15
4. "On Golden Pond" – 17:49
5. "The Warning Track" – 5:47

== Personnel ==
- Derek Bailey – guitar
- George Lewis – trombone
- John Zorn – alto saxophone
