= The Lost String =

- Directed by: Anaïs Prosaïc
- Starring: Marc Ribot
- Music by: Marc Ribot
- Distributed by: La Huit
- Release date: 2007
- Language: English with French Subtitles

The Lost String (also known as La Corde Perdue) is a documentary film on American alternative guitarist Marc Ribot directed by French film maker Anaïs Prosaïc.

== Synopsis ==
Drawing from performance and conversation, the film explores Marc's multifaceted New York City art soul and his commitment to downtown music as he travels from one place to the other. It features performances of a range of Ribot's music and appearances by Anthony Coleman, Brad Jones, EJ Rodriguez, Los Cubanos Postizos, Catherine Janiaux, The Lounge Lizards, Shrek, Christine Bard, Ted Reichman, John Zorn, Ned Rothenberg, Sim Caine, Bruce Cox, Dave Hofstra and Arto Lindsay.

Partly via the documentary, Ribot was considered, "...one of the most inventive guitarists of his generation."
