= Yo! I Killed Your God =

Live album by Marc Ribot
- Released: May 18, 1999
- Recorded: 1992–1994
- Genre: Avant-garde jazz
- Length: 72:47
- Label: Tzadik
- Producer: John Zorn, Marc Ribot

Marc Ribot chronology
The Prosthetic Cubans (1998)	Yo! I Killed Your God (1999)	Muy Divertido! (2000)

Yo! I Killed Your God is a live album by American musician Marc Ribot, recorded live between 1992 and 1994 and featuring his experimental punk rock group Shrek. It was released May 18, 1999 on Tzadik Records.

== Reception ==
The Allmusic review by David Freedlander awarded the album 4 stars, stating, "All in all, another fine effort from a virtuoso guitarist. Difficult listening, but worth the effort".

Professional ratings
Review scores
Source	Rating
Allmusic	4/5 stars

== Track listing ==
All compositions by Marc Ribot, except where noted.

1. "I Fall to Pieces" – 0:47
2. "Yo! I Killed Your God" – 2:58
3. "Human Sacrifice" – 10:03
4. "The Wind Cries Mary" (Jimi Hendrix) – 6:36
5. "Softly as in a Morning Sunrise" (Oscar Hammerstein II, Sigmund Romberg) – 5:34
6. "Fourth World" – 8:18
7. "Requiem for What’s His Name" – 5:09
8. "Somebody In My House" – 3:10
9. "Clever White Youths with Attitude" – 2:31
10. "Expressionless" – 1:49
11. "Jamon Con Yucca" – 4:12
12. "Pulse" – 8:08
13. "Change Has Come" – 9:07
14. "Mon Petit Punk" – 4:16

== Personnel ==
- Tracks 1–7 were recorded live at CBGB, New York City (November 1992).
  - Marc Ribot – guitar, vocals
  - Chris Wood – guitar
  - Sebastian Steinberg – bass
  - Dougie Bowne – drums
- Tracks 8–9 were recorded live at CBGB, New York (December 1992).
  - Marc Ribot – guitar, vocals
  - Roger Kleier – guitar
  - Sebastian Steinberg – bass
  - Jim Pugliese – drums
- Track 10 was recorded live at Rote Fabrik, Zurich (1994).
  - Marc Ribot – guitar, vocals
  - JD Foster – guitar
  - Chris Wood – bass
  - Jim Pugliese – drums
  - Christine Bard– drums
- Track 11 was recorded live in Tokyo (1994).
  - Marc Ribot – guitar, vocals
  - JD Foster – guitar
  - Sebastian Steinberg – bass
  - Jim Pugliese – drums
  - Christine Bard – drums
- Tracks 12–13 were recorded live in Nagoya (1994).
  - Marc Ribot – guitar, vocals
  - JD Foster – guitar
  - Sebastian Steinberg – bass
  - Jim Pugliese – drums
  - Christine Bard – drums
- Track 14 was recorded at Low Blood Studio, New York (1994).
  - Marc Ribot – guitar, vocals
  - Mark Anthony Thompson – bass, sequencer
  - Francois Lardeau – drum programming

== Personnel ==
- John Zorn – producer
- Marc Ribot – producer
- Kazunori Sugiyama – associate producer
- Mark Anthony Thompson – producer (track 14)
- Allan Tucker – mastering engineer
- Shoichi – photographer
- Danny C – photographer
- Bert Detant – photographer
- Ikue Mori – design
