= Shoe String Symphonettes =

Soundtrack album by Marc Ribot
- Released: March 18, 1997
- Genre: Avant-garde jazz, experimental music
- Length: 45:13
- Label: Tzadik
- Producer: JD Foster

Marc Ribot chronology
Don't Blame Me (1995)	Shoe String Symphonettes (1997)	The Prosthetic Cubans (1998)

Shoe String Symphonettes is a 1997 album of film music by Marc Ribot released on Tzadik Records.

== Recording ==
The album contains soundtracks for five short films; the earliest being Landlord Blues directed by Jacob Burkardt (1987), followed by Death by Unnatural Causes directed by Karen Bellone and Lisa Rinzler (1991); one track for Summer Salt directed By Charles Levi (1993); Ribot's music for the silent film Aelita Queen of Mars directed by Yakov Protazanov (1928) was a mixture of live recordings from the 1995 Meltdown Festival mixed with backing tracks recorded in London and a live recording from The Knitting Factory; and Pieces from an Incomplete Project directed by Joe Brewster (1996).

Ribot stated "A lot of what I wrote was source music. In films, you write the score, but there's also source music. For example, if a scene takes place in a disco and the filmmaker doesn't want to shell out for rights to a disco hit, you write some disco. “Montuno” is a salsa tune. Jacob Burkhardt, the director, needed something that established a backyard on the Lower East Side. ... I gave it to the producer, J.D. Foster, to sequence, but I'm happy with the way he did it. I think it made the record as a whole more listenable. “Aelita” is pretty rough going; I chopped up the score into three suites. I don't mind mixing things up in that way. It's like making a salad, things rub off on each other".

== Reception ==
Professional ratings
Review scores
Source	Rating
Allmusic	3/5 stars

Allmusic awarded the album 3 stars with reviewer Sean Cooper stating, "Symphonettes features some of Ribot's most compelling work to date, both creatively augmenting the originals and sketching out cinematic spaces more or less autonomous from the films they were inspired by".

== Track listing ==
All compositions are by Marc Ribot except where noted.

1. "Looks Like Hell" – 2:17
2. "Hitman" – 2:07
3. "Aelita Suite I: Martian/Lost in Space/More Martians/Harping and Burning/Prepare for Landing" – 6:46
4. "Montuno" – 3:28
5. "Bells" (Albert Ayler) – 1:07
6. "Aelita Suite II: Martian Telescope/Men of Science" – 3:05
7. "Before the Prison Riot" – 3:28
8. "You Kill Him" – 5:01
9. "Surf's Down" – 1:27
10. "Paul's There" – 2:22
11. "Did You?" – 2:05
12. "Aelita Suite III: A Message from Mars/Martian Battle/Avante Popolo" – 6:54
13. "End Credits (Landlord Blues)" – 2:12
14. "End Credits (Death By Unnatural Causes)" – 2:54
- Tracks 1, 5 and 14 were recorded at Bear Track, New York City for the short film Death By Unnatural Causes (1991).
- Tracks 2, 4 and 13 were recorded at Studio Crisp, New York City for the film Landlord Blues.
- Tracks 3, 6 and 12 were recorded live at the Meltdown Festival, Royal Festival Hall, London in 1995 and used in the film Aelita, Queen of Mars. The end of track 12 was recorded live at the Knitting Factory, New York City.
- Tracks 7, 8, 10 and 11 were recorded at Studio 900, New York City in 1996 for the film Pieces from an Incomplete Project.
- Track 9 was recorded at Splash Studios, New York City in 1993 for the film Summer Salt.

== Personnel ==
- Marc Ribot – guitars, sampler, trumpet, banjo, E-flat horn
- Greg Cohen (1, 14) – bass
- Jill Jaffe (1, 7, 8, 10, 11, 14) – violin, viola
- Brad Jones (2, 4, 13) – bass
- Bill Ware (2, 4, 13) – vibraphone
- Curtis Fowlkes (2, 4, 13) – trombone
- Jim Nolet (2, 4, 13) – violin
- Roy Nathanson (2, 4, 13) – saxophone
- E.J. Rodriguez (2, 4, 13) – drums, percussion
- Gregory Ribot (2, 4, 13) – flute
- Paul Clarvis (3, 6, 12) – drums, percussion
- Dave Maric (3, 6, 12) – keyboards
- Phil Boyden (3, 6, 12) – violin
- Helen Thomas (3, 6, 12) – cello
- Mike Kearsey (3, 6, 12) – trombone
- Anthony Coleman (12b) – organ
- Ikue Mori (12b) – percussion
- Jim Staley (12b) – trombone
- Dave Douglas (7, 8, 10, 11) – trumpet
- Vicki Bodner (7, 8, 10, 11) – oboe
- Charlie Giordano (7, 8, 10, 11) – piano, keyboards
- Mauro Refosco (7, 8, 10, 11) – percussion
- Maxine Neuman (7, 8, 10, 11) – cello
- Tony Garnier (7, 8, 10, 11) – bass
- John Zorn (9) – saxophone
- Andy Haas (9) – saxophone
- Cyro Baptista (9) – drums
