= 50th Birthday Celebration Volume 9 =

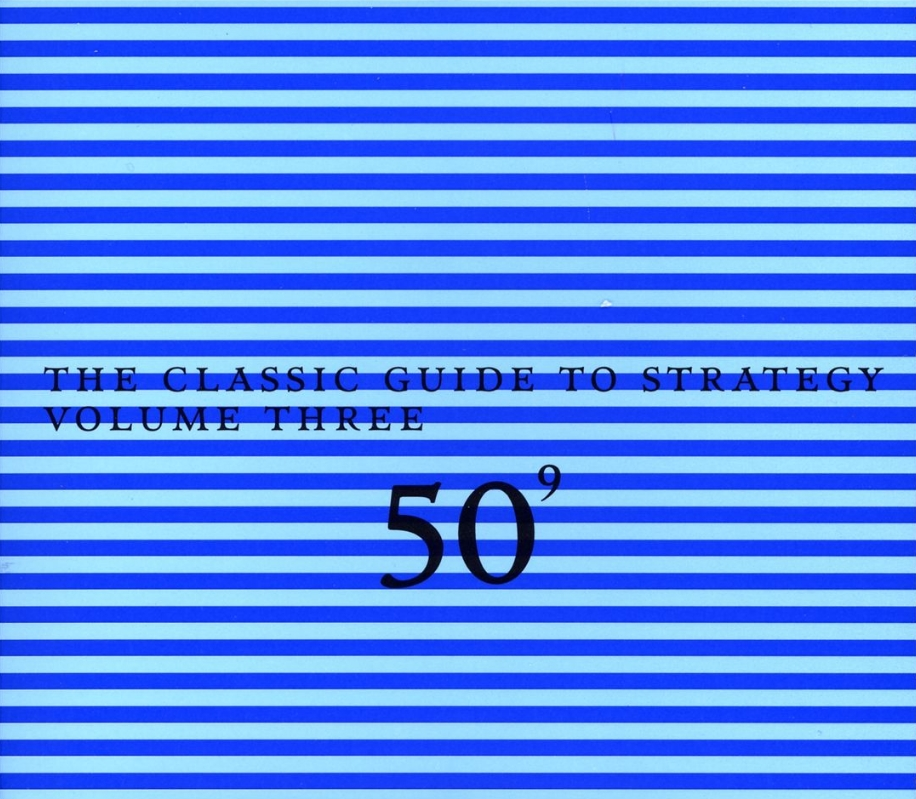

Live album by John Zorn
- Released: November 23, 2004
- Recorded: September 8, 2003
- Genre: Downtown music Avant-garde jazz
- Length: 44:10
- Label: Tzadik TZ 5009
- Producer: John Zorn

John Zorn chronology
Naninani II (2004)	50th Birthday Celebration Volume 9 (2004)	50th Birthday Celebration Volume 10 (2004)

50th Birthday Celebration Volume 9 (also referred to as The Classic Guide to Strategy Volume 3: The Fire Book) is a live album by John Zorn featuring a solo performance at Tonic in September 2003 that was part of his month-long 50th Birthday Celebration concert series. It is a continuation of his solo work documented on The Classic Guide to Strategy Volumes 1 & 2.

== Reception ==
Professional ratings
Review scores
Source	Rating
Allmusic	4/5 stars

The Allmusic review by Sean Westergaard stated "Any fan of free improvisation or any student of the alto saxophone would do well to check out The Classic Guide to Strategy, Vol. 3: The Fire Book. It demonstrates in yet another way that John Zorn is truly one of the masters of his instrument."

== Track listing ==
All tracks are written by John Zorn.

No.	Title	Length
1.	"The Fire Book: One"	15:59
2.	"The Fire Book: Two"	8:11
3.	"The Fire Book: Three"	3:27
4.	"The Fire Book: Four"	8:42
5.	"The Fire Book: Five"	7:19

== Personnel ==
- John Zorn – alto saxophone
