= ¡Muy Divertido! =

Muy Divertido!

Studio album by Marc Ribot
- Released: April 25, 2000
- Recorded: 2000
- Studio: The Magic Shop, New York, New York, U.S.
- Genre: Latin jazz, jazz fusion, world fusion
- Length: 43:00
- Label: Atlantic
- Producer: JD Foster

Marc Ribot chronology
Yo! I Killed Your God (1999)	Muy Divertido! (2000)	Saints (2001)

¡Muy Divertido! (Very Entertaining!) is a studio album recorded in New York City by American guitarist and composer Marc Ribot with Los Cubanos Postizos. It was released on April 25, 2000, on Atlantic Records.

== Reception ==
Professional ratings
Review scores
Source	Rating
AllMusic	3/5 stars

AllMusic awarded the album 3 stars and the review by Steve Huey states, "Regrouping his Latin backing band Los Cubanos Postizos, Marc Ribot offers a sequel to his 1998 Arsenio Rodríguez tribute The Prosthetic Cubans in Muy Divertido! ("very entertaining"). While there are once again a few songs penned by Rodríguez, there's also a greater variety of composers represented, including three Ribot originals... Overall, it's a worthy follow-up for anyone who enjoyed the first installment".

On All About Jazz Douglas Payne wrote "eccentric downtown guitarist Marc Ribot has made a career out of being unpredictable - and never less than totally interesting ... Restless Ribot varies the menu with all sorts of spicy flavors on ¡Muy Divertido! (Very Entertaining!), never settling in one place for longer than the fun will last. He crafts interesting uses of vocals and, most appealingly, organ to keep the whole party a little off kilter too. The first time it's a fiesta. But each time you come back - and this listener found it hard to resist - Ribot reveals some magical musical gifts here that go well beyond Cuban territories".

== Track listing ==
No.	Title	Writer(s)	Length
1.	"Dame un cachito pa' huele"	Arsenio Rodríguez	3:15
2.	"Las lomas de New Jersey"	Marc Ribot	4:37
3.	"El gaucho rojo"	Ribot	5:55
4.	"Obsesión"	Pedro Flores	4:20
5.	"El divorcio"	Rodriguez	3:44
6.	"Se formó el bochinche"	Rodriguez	4:30
7.	"Baile baile baile"	Ribot	4:04
8.	"No puedo frenar"	Flores	4:30
9.	"Jaguey"	Rodriguez	4:33
10.	"Carmela dame la llave"	A.L. Torruellas	3:14

== Personnel ==
- Marc Ribot – guitars, vocals
- Anthony Coleman – keyboards
- Brad Jones – bass, twelve string guitar
- E.J. Rodriguez – congas, percussion, vocals
- Roberto Rodriguez – drums, timbales, timpani, percussion
- Marcus Rojas − tuba (track 4)
- Steve Nieve (track 1), Riley Osborne (tracks 8 & 10) − organ
- JD Foster- bass (track 7), producer
- Andy Taub − keyboards (track 4)
- Frankie Vasquez - vocals, percussion, backing vocals (tracks 2, 6 & 10)
- Eszter Balint − vocals, backing vocals (tracks 1, 6 & 7)
