= Anna Coogan =

American singer-songwriter

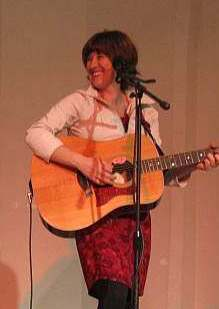
- Anna Coogan in 2012

Background information
- Born: Boston, Massachusetts, United States
- Genres: Alternative country, rock
- Occupations: Musician, songwriter
- Instrument: Guitar

Anna Coogan is an American singer, guitarist and songwriter.

== Biography ==
After studying opera at the Mozarteum University of Salzburg for a year, Coogan went to Seattle to work as a limnologist. In 2012 she moved to Ithaca, New York, where she is a visiting lecturer in music at Cornell University. In 2020 she moved to The Netherlands. Coogan now also works as a physical therapist and coaches people around the world in the connection between music and physiology.

== Recordings ==
Anna Coogan started her musical career in Seattle, and formed the band North 19 in 2004 with Travis Beard and Kevin Burkett. She developed her "bittersweet Americana" style in this band, which released two albums and was reviewed in No Depression.

JD Foster produced her first solo album, The Nocturnal Among Us, released in 2010. The songs on her next album, The Wasted Ocean, were inspired by haunting tales of shipwrecks and isolation. Musicians contributing to the 2011 album (produced by Evan Brubacker) include singer Edie Cary, violist Eyvind Kang and electric guitarist Daniele Fiaschi. Coogan and Fiaschi released The Nowhere, Rome Sessions in 2012.

Coogan renewed her collaboration with JD Foster in 2013 and co-wrote a collection of new songs with the producer and multi-instrumentalist for their album The Birth of the Stars, recorded in October 2014 at Electric Wilburland studio in Newfield, New York. Her next album, The Lonely Cry Of Space & Time, was released in early 2017 and subsequently issued on vinyl. Coogan contributed vocals to three Johnny Dowd albums, That's Your Wife on the Back of My Horse (2015), Execute American Folklore (2016) and Twinkle, Twinkle (2018).

== Touring ==
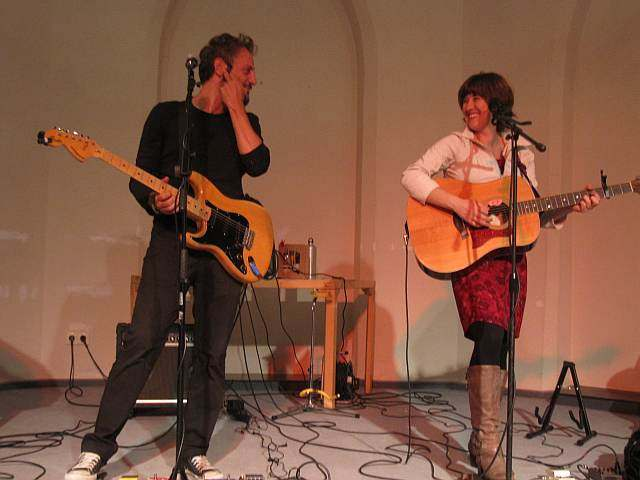
Anna Coogan with Daniele Fiaschi, 2012

Coogan tours regularly in the United States and Europe, including venues in Great Britain, the Netherlands and Germany with Daniele Fiaschi; and performs at international festivals such as the Blue Ball Festival in Luzern, The Maverick Festival in Suffolk, United Kingdom; the Glasgow Americana Festival and Celtic Connections. She has also performed on Daytrotter and on major European radio stations including BBC 2 and WDR, Cologne. A 2012 European tour was joined by Seattle-based songwriter Joy Mills. In 2014, Coogan formed a trio with JD Foster and drummer Brian Wilson, aka Willie B., (whose credits include playing with Johnny Dowd and Neko Case), for a tour of the Netherlands and Germany. Coogan and Willie B. toured Europe again in 2015 and 2017. She toured the U.K. in January 2018 and performed as a member of the Johnny Dowd Band on a European tour in February 2018.

== Film scores ==
In 2015, Coogan wrote a score for Jean Epstein and Luis Buñuel's silent horror film The Fall of the House of Usher to perform with Tzar (Willie B. and Michael Stark) at the Ithaca Fantastik Film Festival (IFFF). In March 2016, Coogan and Tzar performed an original score for the 1924 Soviet film Aelita, Queen of Mars at Cornell Cinema. Coogan wrote and performed a solo electric guitar score for Jean Cocteau's The Blood of a Poet for the 2017 IFFF, for a screening Nov. 10 at Cinemapolis in Ithaca. She accompanied the Cocteau film with performances of the score on a tour of the United Kingdom in January 2018. Coogan wrote and performs a silent score for an episode of the detective serie Beatrice Fairfax from 1916 (A name fore the baby OR The Curse of Eve).

== Critics ==
"Her voice is sweet and engaging but has enough salt in it to bring out some of the melancholy and brooding beauty of her lyrics." – The Telegraph (UK)

"She sings about science and outerspace, environmental issues, family and love. While most artists would fall flat on their face when they tried to cover that much ground Coogan never loses focus. She is a poet, a singer and an ace guitarist, alternating between Chris Isaac and Ry Cooder, rowdy garage rock, mainstream pop, vocal pyrotechnics, and intricate soundscapes." – Here Comes The Flood (NL)

== Discography ==
- Cowboys Lullaby, 2004
- Glory (with North 19), Tarnished Records, 2004
- Sleepwalker (with North 19), 2007
- The Nocturnal Among Us, 2010
- The Wasted Ocean, 2012
- The Nowhere, Rome Sessions (with Daniele Fiaschi), 2012
- Live at Little Rabbit Barn (with Daniele Fiaschi), 2013
- The Birth of the Stars (with JD Foster), Elevate, 2014
- Live at the Triple Door (with Willie B.), 2015
- The Lonely Cry Of Space & Time (with Willie B.), 2017
