= First Recordings 1973 =

Compilation album by John Zorn
- Released: 1995
- Recorded: 1973
- Genres: Avant-garde, collage
- Length: 77:41
- Label: Tzadik TZ 7304
- Producer: John Zorn

John Zorn chronology
Zohar (1995)	First Recordings 1973 (1995)	Redbird (1995)

First Recordings 1973 is a compilation album by American jazz saxophonist John Zorn featuring recordings that he made while still a student between 1973 and 1974 which was released on the Tzadik label in 1995.

== Reception ==
Professional ratings
Review scores
Source	Rating
AllMusic	3.5/5 stars
The Penguin Guide to Jazz	3/4 stars

The AllMusic review by Stacia Proefrock noted: "Zorn calls this collection "the craziest stuff I've ever done" and he could be right, with the possible exception of the Painkiller albums, which are perhaps just louder rather than crazier. That said, this work is, predictably, not Zorn's best, but it holds value for fans as an embryonic example of his innovation and style".

The Penguin Guide to Jazz observed: "The debut recordings see him navigating a solitary course through the shattered columns of avant-garde jazz ... suggests where Zorn was artistically at the age of nineteen ... [and] offer useful pointers to the years ahead and their obsessions".

== Track listing ==
1. "Mikhail Zoetrope" (1974): Act I - 22:13
2. "Mikhail Zoetrope" (1974): Act II - 13:30
3. "Mikhail Zoetrope" (1974): Act III - 11:00
4. "Conquest of Mexico" (1973): Part 1 Warning Signs - 7:45
5. "Conquest of Mexico (1973): Part 2 Confession - 3:39
6. "Conquest of Mexico" (1973): Part 3 Convulsions/Abdication - 3:56
7. "Wind Ko/La" (1973) - 3:04
8. "Automata of Al-Jazari" (1974) - 1:16
9. "Variations on a Theme by Albert Ayler" (1973) - 11:14

== Personnel ==
- John Zorn – all instruments and sounds
