= Saints (Marc Ribot album) =

Studio album by Marc Ribot
- Released: September 18, 2001
- Recorded: 2001
- Studio: Sperry Sound & Picture, New York, NY
- Genre: Avant-garde jazz
- Length: 42:34
- Label: Atlantic
- Producer: JD Foster

Marc Ribot chronology
Muy Divertido! (2000)	Saints (2001)	Inasmuch as Life is Borrowed (2001)

Saints is a 2001 album of solo guitar recorded by Marc Ribot. It features several interpretations of compositions by Albert Ayler, as well as traditional spirituals, jazz standards, showtunes, and a song by The Beatles.

== Reception ==
Professional ratings
Review scores
Source	Rating
Allmusic	4/5 stars

The Allmusic review by Alex Henderson states, "Ribot approaches avant-garde jazz in a very different way. Saints is full of discernible melodies; typically, Ribot will warmly embrace a melody before he ventures outside. And that inside/outside contrast serves him well throughout this excellent and very unpredictable CD".

In The New York Times Adam Shatz said the album "provides a fine opportunity to hear Mr. Ribot in an uncluttered solo performance" noting "Saints is a curious follow-up to his last two records, which featured Los Cubanos Postizos ... On Saints, Mr. Ribot, 47, has gone back to the understated, contemplative style of his 1995 release Don't Blame Me. It's the kind of record that should be heard by no more than one person at a time".

JazzTimes's Aaron Steinberg wrote "you have to think the guy’s Atlantic days are numbered. Saints delivers Ribot in all his pre-Postizos glory. This creaky, unrushed, all-solo guitar recital finds Ribot scratching his strings ragged, beating out blunt and wobbly notes with his bludgeon/pick, strangling the holy hell out of pop and jazz tunes alike, and making tremendously delicate music in the process. Once again, Ribot revisits the work of Albert Ayler ... Much like Ayler, Ribot is a noisy radical who keeps melody close to his heart. He may warp it, pound it or twist it until it’s practically worried through, but with each tune on Saints, the melody survives".

On All About Jazz David Adler said "Perhaps the most interesting facet of Marc Ribot's solo guitar exposition is its focus on Albert Ayler ... Ribot, who of course has never been a mainstream jazzer, makes a bold move toward a different model entirely—one in which rigorous knowledge of harmony and melody bumps up against an Aylerian outlaw sensibility, resulting in a sonic landscape that could only have been dreamed up by Ribot himself".

BBC Music reviewer Dan Hill stated that "Recorded in honest, naked detail, warts and all, Ribot reveals once again just how good a guitarist he is - an instantly recognisable character on this most-overplayed of instruments, largely thanks to his instincts for pushing the guitar around a bit ... Ribot touches all the right buttons, plotting a wonderfully wayward course between Rain Dogs and the Knitting Factory; intensely frivolous faux-Cuban and serious avant-radicalism. Ribot has his cake, and eats it too, every time".

== Track listing ==
1. "Saints" (Albert Ayler) – 4:39
2. "Book of Heads #13" (John Zorn) – 3:33
3. "I'm Getting Sentimental Over You" (George Bassman, Ned Washington) – 4:13
4. "Empty" (Marc Ribot, Francois Lardeau) – 2:21
5. "Happiness Is a Warm Gun" (John Lennon, Paul McCartney) – 4:32
6. "I'm Confessin' (That I Love You)" (Doc Daughtery, Al Neiburg, Ellis Reynolds) – 4:01
7. "Go Down Moses" (Traditional; arranged by Ribot) – 4:04
8. "St. James Infirmary" (Traditional; arranged by Ribot) – 3:42
9. "Somewhere" (Leonard Bernstein, Stephen Sondheim) – 2:41
10. "Holy Holy Holy" (Traditional; arranged by Ribot) – 4:38
11. "It Could Have Been Very Beautiful" (John Lurie) – 4:10
12. "Witches and Devils" (Albert Ayler) – 4:24

== Personnel ==
- Marc Ribot – guitars
- JD Foster - producer
