= Zohar (album) =

Studio album by Mystic Fugu Orchestra (John Zorn & Yamantaka Eye)
- Released: 1995
- Genre: Avant-garde
- Length: 23:38
- Label: Tzadik TZ 7106
- Producer: John Zorn

John Zorn chronology
John Zorn's Cobra: Live at the Knitting Factory (1995)	Zohar (1995)	First Recordings 1973 (1995)

John Zorn and Yamataka Eye chronology
Nani Nani (1994)	Zohar (1995)	Naninani II (2004)

Zohar is an album by the Mystic Fugu Orchestra (John Zorn (as Rav Tzizit) and Yamataka Eye (as Rav Yechida) who perform a range of music inspired by historical recordings of ancient Judaica. To simulate the "antiquity" of these recordings, a heavy layer of surface noise was overlaid on the music to represent the playing quality of a 78 rpm gramophone record.

== Reception ==
The Allmusic review by Joslyn Layne awarded the album 1.5 stars stating "Just under half an hour's worth of old record spin-and-crackle sounds in the foreground, with a faint background of John Zorn adding small amounts of harmonium and Yamantaka Eye voicing occasional hums and tones. Most of what you hear, however, is record surface static and the revolutions of the vinyl. Zohar could only be of use to completists, or as a layer for mixing".

Professional ratings
Review scores
Source	Rating
Allmusic	1.5/5 stars

== Track listing ==
1. "Alef" – 0:40
2. "Book Of Splendors" – 3:48
3. "Frog Doina" – 2:02
4. "The Dybbuk" – 2:28
5. "2000 Years" – 0:59
6. "Goniff Dance" – 2:17
7. "Rav Nova" – 7:44
8. "Zayin" – 3:37
- All compositions by John Zorn/Yamataka Eye

== Personnel ==
- Rav Tzizit (John Zorn) – harmonium
- Rav Yechida (Yamataka Eye) – voice
