= 50th Birthday Celebration Volume 8 =

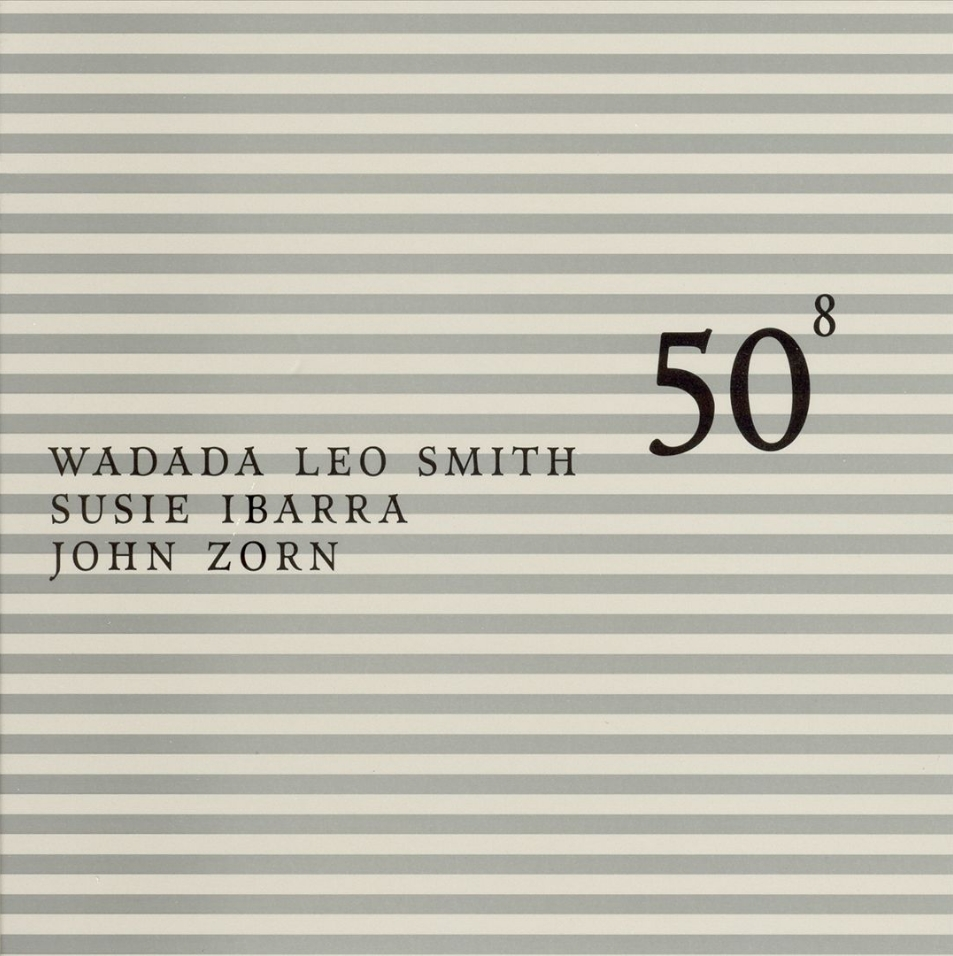

Live album by John Zorn, Wadada Leo Smith, Susie Ibarra
- Released: October 19, 2004
- Recorded: September 22, 2003
- Genre: Downtown music Avant-garde jazz
- Length: 76:00
- Label: Tzadik TZ 5008
- Producer: John Zorn

John Zorn chronology
Magick (2004)	50th Birthday Celebration Volume 8 (2004)	Naninani II (2004)

50th Birthday Celebration Volume 8 is a live album of improvised music by Susie Ibarra, Wadada Leo Smith and John Zorn documenting their performance at Tonic in September 2003 as part of Zorn's month-long 50th Birthday Celebration concert series.

== Reception ==
The Allmusic review by Thom Jurek awarded the album 4 stars stating "This is one volume in this series not to miss."

Professional ratings
Review scores
Source	Rating
Allmusic	4/5 stars

== Track listing ==
No.	Title	Writer(s)	Length
1.	"Meridian"	John Zorn, Susie Ibarra	4:19
2.	"Rising Sign"	Zorn, Ibarra	7:01
3.	"Spirit Writing"	Zorn, Ibarra	6:09
4.	"By the Mark, Eight"	Zorn, Ibarra	7:06
5.	"Visitation"	Zorn, Ibarra	8:33
6.	"Ipsissimi"	Zorn, Ibarra, Wadada Leo Smith	15:59
7.	"Ghost Writing"	Zorn, Ibarra, Smith	11:59
8.	"The Ascending Arc"	Zorn, Smith	8:02
9.	"Full Fathom Five"	Zorn, Ibarra, Smith	6:50

== Personnel ==
- John Zorn – alto saxophone
- Susie Ibarra – drums (Tracks 1–7 & 9)
- Wadada Leo Smith – trumpet (Tracks 6–9)
