= Soundtracks Volume 2 =

Soundtrack album by Marc Ribot
- Released: September 23, 2003
- Genre: Avant-garde jazz, experimental music
- Length: 52:33
- Label: Tzadik
- Producer: Marc Ribot

Marc Ribot chronology
Scelsi Morning (2003)	Soundtracks Volume 2 (2003)	Spiritual Unity (2005)

Soundtracks Volume 2 is a 2003 album of film music by Marc Ribot released on Tzadik Records.

== Reception ==
The Allmusic review by Sean Westergaard states, "The already eclectic Marc Ribot may have released his widest-reaching album to date with Soundtracks, Vol. 2. From neo-Dixieland to spooky electronica to solo shakuhachi, Ribot turns in a head-spinning program of disparate genres that hang together surprisingly well as an album... Ribot's guitar credentials have never been in doubt, but his recent works for Tzadik is showing him to be an impressive composer with a broad palette as well".

Professional ratings
Review scores
Source	Rating
Allmusic	4/5 stars

== Track listing ==
All compositions are by Marc Ribot.

1. "Small Consolation" – 0:52
2. "Prowler" – 2:57
3. "House of Mirrors" – 1:48
4. "Urbanight" – 2:38
5. "Shockuhachi" – 1:23
6. "Blue Party" – 1:07
7. "The Beast in the Jungle" – 2:27
8. "Nausea" – 2:57
9. "Savannah" – 2:15
10. "Miles to Go" – 1:01
11. "The Dream of the Other" – 1:02
12. "Green Party" – 0:52
13. "Pensando" – 3:52
14. "Blurry in Brooklyn" – 1:48
15. "The Killing Zone" – 5:07
16. "Flatbush Eye" – 1:27
17. "Miles Behind" – 0:57
18. "Requiem for Eitan" – 3:03
19. "Penitant Skyline" – 0:40
20. "The Persistence of Memory" – 7:35
21. "Lost Children" – 5:18
22. "Green Party (Radio Mix)" – 0:50
- Tracks 1, 3, 6, 8, 10, 12, 17, 19 and 22 were recorded at Sperry Sound, New York City and written for Gregory Feldman's Joe Schmo (1999).
- Tracks 2, 5, 13, 15, 16, 20 and 21 were recorded at Ribosound Studios, New York City and written for Michele Stephenson's The Killing Zone (2003), except track 20, which was written for Jennifer Reeves' The Time We Killed (2004).
- Tracks 4, 7, 9, 11, 14 and 18 were recorded at The Magic Shop, New York City and written for Michele Stephenson's The Killing Zone (2003).

== Personnel ==
- Marc Ribot – guitars, trumpet, Eb horn, sequencer
- Anthony Coleman (3, 6, 8, 10, 12, 22) – sampler, piano, organ
- Matt Darriau (1, 3) – clarinet
- Alex Foster (3, 6, 10, 12, 17, 19, 22) – clarinet, saxophone
- JD Foster (1, 3, 6, 10, 12, 17, 19, 22) – bass
- Roberto Rodriguez (1, 3, 6, 10, 12, 17, 22) – drums
- Steven Bernstein (7, 18) – trumpet
- Mark Feldman (4, 7, 11, 14, 18) – violin
- Jill Jaffe (4, 7, 11, 14, 18) – viola
- Francois Lardeau (16, 20) – drum sequencing
- Frank London (2, 5, 7, 9, 11, 13–16, 18, 21) – trumpet
- Jay Rodriguez (14) – saxophone
- E.J. Rodriguez (4, 7, 14) – percussion
- Ned Rothenberg (5, 15, 20) – shakuhachi flute, flute, alto
- Peter Scherer (4, 7, 11, 14, 18) – sampler, piano, synthesizer
- Sebastian Steinberg (4, 7, 9, 11,14–16) – bass
