= Naninani II =

Studio album by John Zorn & Yamantaka Eye
- Released: October 19, 2004
- Recorded: September 7, 2003
- Genre: Avant-garde
- Length: 46:54
- Label: Tzadik TZ 7250
- Producer: John Zorn

John Zorn chronology
50th Birthday Celebration Volume 8 (2004)	Naninani II (2004)	50th Birthday Celebration Volume 9 (2004)

John Zorn and Yamataka Eye chronology
Zohar (1995)	Naninani II (2004)	50th Birthday Celebration Volume 10 (2005)

Naninani II is an album of improvised music by American composer and saxophonist/multi-instrumentalist John Zorn and Yamataka Eye. It is a sequel to their previous album Nani Nani which was released in 1995.

== Reception ==
Professional ratings
Review scores
Source	Rating
Allmusic	3.5/5 stars
Pitchfork Media	7.7/10 stars

The Allmusic review by Wade Kergan awarded the album 3½ stars stating "Choosing to turn inward rather than freaking out makes this the most satisfying meeting of Eye and Zorn yet". Pitchfork reviewer Cameron Macdonald gave the album 7.7 out of 10 stating "I don't want to know the sight or smell of whoever produced those noises".

== Track listing ==
All compositions by John Zorn and Yamataka Eye

1. "Fuckxotica" - 4:18
2. "Hilo Himo" - 3:14
3. "Shiso Baba" - 8:24
4. "UFOFF" - 7:34
5. "Bar Time with Eno" - 3:44
6. "Kiri Taki" - 3:44
7. "4AB" - 1:54
8. "Fat Anarchy on Airtube" - 9:37
9. "Espimo" - 2:12
10. "Macabro Delicato" - 2:13

== Personnel ==
- Yamataka Eye - voice, electronics, organ, banjo, steel guitar, electric fan, objects, percussion
- John Zorn - alto saxophone, piano, tabla machine, Tibetan bells, percussion
