= Block Ice & Propane =

Studio album by Erik Friedlander
- Released: August 14, 2007
- Recorded: August 22 & 23, 2005; Pueblo Street, San Francisco
- Genre: Avant-garde, jazz, Americana, contemporary classical music
- Length: 45:19
- Label: Skipstone 001
- Producer: Erik Friedlander

Erik Friedlander chronology
Volac: Book of Angels Volume 8 (2007)	Block Ice & Propane (2007)	Broken Arm Trio (2008)

Block Ice & Propane is a solo album by cellist Erik Friedlander performing compositions inspired by memories of childhood camping trips across the United States.

== Reception ==
Professional ratings
Review scores
Source	Rating
Allmusic	4/5 stars
Pitchfork	7.7/10 stars
The Penguin Guide to Jazz Recordings	3/4 stars

The Allmusic review by Jo-Ann Greene awarded the album 4 stars stating "It's a picture of Americana at once familiar, yet unlike anything heard before, as the musician coaxes his cello into the aural shape of banjos and fingerpicked guitars; a truly astounding set".

Pitchfork rated the album 7.7 out of 10 observing that "Friedlander wields not only unfathomable technical ability but also uncommon inquisitiveness tailed by imagination. Block Ice, more personal than his previous solo work, is the product of such breadth: In his hands, the cello is capable of long, daunting tones, hanging, impressionistic pizzicato phrases, and short, furious hybrid bursts of both".

The New York Times review by Ben Sisario called it "the avant-cello album of the summer". Writing for All About Jazz, John Kelman commented "Block Ice & Propane supports his reputation as the most innovative, imaginative and stylistically unbound cellist in improvised music". Michael J. West stated in JazzTimes that "Friedlander is both a virtuoso and a stirring melodist; with those combined attributes, the tracks sound simple and hummable (more so than they actually are), and haunt from the moment they’re heard. The harmonies also give great pleasure, and suggest that Friedlander’s studied British folk".

== Track listing ==
All compositions by Erik Friedlander

1. "King Rig" - 2:52
2. "Dream Song" - 6:22
3. "Airstream Envy" - 3:25
4. "Road Weary" - 1:55
5. "Night White" - 4:07
6. "Block Ice & Propane" - 3:23
7. "A Thousand Unpieced Suns" - 2:18
8. "Rushmore" - 4:40
9. "Rusting in Honeysuckle" - 3:10
10. "Cold Chicken" - 0:59
11. "Yakima" - 4:17
12. "Pressure Cooking" - 3:04
13. "Valley of Fire" - 4:47

== Personnel ==
- Erik Friedlander – cello
