= Volac: Book of Angels Volume 8 =

Studio album by Erik Friedlander
- Released: September 25, 2007
- Genres: Avant-garde, contemporary classical music, jazz, kletzmer
- Length: 41:24
- Label: Tzadik
- Producer: John Zorn

Book of Angels chronology
Asmodeus: Book of Angels Volume 7 (2007)	Volac: Book of Angels Volume 8 (2007)	Xaphan: Book of Angels Volume 9 (2008)

Erik Friedlander chronology
Eiger (2006)	Volac: Book of Angels Volume 8 (2007)	Block Ice & Propane (2007)

Professional ratings
Review scores
Source	Rating
The Penguin Guide to Jazz Recordings	3.5/4 stars

Volac: Book of Angels Volume 8 is an album by Erik Friedlander performing compositions from John Zorn's second Masada book, "The Book of Angels".

== Track listing ==
All compositions by John Zorn

1. "Harhazial" - 4:36
2. "Rachsiel" - 2:39
3. "Zumiel" - 1:40
4. "Yeruel" - 3:24
5. "Sannul" - 1:19
6. "Haseha" - 4:36
7. "Kadal" - 3:53
8. "Ahaniel" - 5:45
9. "Ylrng" - 1:37
10. "Anahel" - 4:18
11. "Sidriel" - 3:03
12. "Zawar" - 4:38

== Personnel ==
- Erik Friedlander – cello
