= Filmworks II: Music for an Untitled Film by Walter Hill =

Soundtrack album by John Zorn
- Released: 1995
- Recorded: 1992
- Genre: avant-garde, jazz, classical
- Length: 34:00
- Label: Toys Factory TFCK-88753; Tzadik TZ 7306
- Producer: John Zorn

Filmworks chronology
| Filmworks 1986–1990 (1991) | Filmworks II: Music for an Untitled Film by Walter Hill (1995) | Filmworks III: 1990–1995 (1995) |

John Zorn chronology
| The Book of Heads (1995) | Filmworks II: Music for an Untitled Film by Walter Hill (1995) | Masada: Hei (1995) |

Filmworks II: Music for an Untitled Film by Walter Hill features the second release of scores for film by American composer John Zorn. The album was originally released on the Japanese Toys Factory label in 1995 and subsequently re-released on Zorn's own label, Tzadik Records, in 1996. It features the music that Zorn wrote and recorded for Trespass which director Walter Hill rejected in favour of a score by Ry Cooder.

== Reception ==
Professional ratings
Review scores
| Source | Rating |
|---|---|
| AllMusic | 2.5/5 stars |

The AllMusic review by Joslyn Layne notes that "Overall, it is very atmospheric, with sections of drawn-out tones that slowly build theater mists in the background of a deserted sense of waiting. Balancing stretches of this kind are sections of bent, mellow country... Lacking contrast, this one is definite background music, and although well done, it is also probably the least interesting of Zorn's film scores".

== Track listing ==
1. "Intro" - 3:07
2. "I Stole From Jesus Christ" - 0:49
3. "Gold" - 0:48
4. "Main Title" - 1:55
5. "The Building" - 0:56
6. "Meatlocker" - 0:55
7. "Pigeons" - 0:52
8. "Scuffle" - 0:19
9. "Exploring" - 0:58
10. "Rattlesnakes (for Sergio Leone)" - 1:43
11. "Two Interiors" - 0:38
12. "Stealth" - 0:42
13. "Action" - 0:48
14. "Dumping The Body" - 0:34
15. "The Trunk" - 0:06
16. "Escape Attempt" - 1:39
17. "Arrival" - 0:43
18. "Prying At The Windows" - 0:35
19. "Arsenal" - 0:54
20. "King James" - 1:04
21. "Powerline" - 0:19
22. "The Magic Of Gold" - 2:25
23. "Chimney" - 0:23
24. "Dilemma" - 1:12
25. "Conspiracy" - 0:45
26. "The Plot (part one)" - 1:32
27. "The Plot (part two)" - 0:43
28. "Heroin Fix" - 2:40
29. "Lucky Run" - 0:58
30. "Vengeance Is Mine" - 2:03
31. "Escape" - 2:00
32. "Kill Fever" - 1:15
33. "Outside" - 0:21
34. "Ending" - 0:50
35. "Alternate Ending/End Title" - 2:32
36. "Arsenal Dance Mix" - 3:57

All compositions by John Zorn

- Recorded and mixed May/June 1992 at Shelley Palmer Studios, New York City

== Personnel ==
- Cyro Baptista: Brazilian percussion
- Anthony Coleman: prepared piano, keyboards
- Carol Emanuel: harp
- Andy Haas: didjeridu
- Jim Pugliese: percussion
- Marc Ribot: guitar, banjo
- David Shea: turntables, sampler
