= Magick (album) =

Studio album by John Zorn
- Released: September 21, 2004
- Genre: Avant-garde, contemporary classical music
- Length: 30:08
- Label: Tzadik TZ 8006
- Producer: John Zorn

John Zorn chronology
50th Birthday Celebration Volume 7 (2004)	Magick (2004)	50th Birthday Celebration Volume 8 (2004)

Magick is an album of contemporary classical music by American avant-garde composer John Zorn.

== Reception ==
The Allmusic review awarded the album 3½ stars.

Professional ratings
Review scores
Source	Rating
Allmusic	3.5/5 stars

== Track listing ==
All compositions by John Zorn.

1. "Necronomicon: Conjurations" - 2:45
2. "Necronomicon: The Magus" - 6:24
3. "Necronomicon: Thought Forms" - 3:07
4. "Necronomicon: Incunabula" - 7:13
5. "Necronomicon: Asmodeus" - 3:02
6. "Sortilège" - 8:53

- Recorded at Hit Factory, New York City

== Personnel ==
- Tracks 1–5 performed by the Crowley Quartet:
- Jennifer Choi: Violin
- Fred Sherry: Cello
- Jesse Mills: Violin
- Richard O'Neill: Viola
- Track 6 performed by:
- Tim Smith: Bass Clarinet
- Mike Lowenstern: Bass Clarinet
