= Marc Ribot Plays Solo Guitar Works of Frantz Casseus =

Studio album by Marc Ribot
- Released: 1993
- Recorded: 1989, 1993
- Genre: Classical music, Haitian music
- Length: 47:30
- Label: Les Disques du Crepuscule
- Producer: Ilana Pelzig Cellum

Marc Ribot chronology
Requiem for What's His Name (1992)	Marc Ribot Plays Solo Guitar Works of Frantz Casseus (1993)	Shrek (1994)

Marc Ribot Plays Solo Guitar Works of Frantz Casseus is a 1993 album of solo guitar works by Haitian-American composer Frantz Casseus recorded by Marc Ribot and released on the Belgian label, Les Disques du Crepuscule. Ribot studied classical guitar under Casseus who fused jazz and the European classical tradition with folk music of his native Haiti. The album was recorded in New York City in 1989 and 1993, and was supervised and approved by an ailing Casséus who died the year it was released.

== Track listing ==
All compositions are by Frantz Casseus.

1. "Simbi" – 3:33
2. "Rara" – 1:45
3. "Prelude #2" – 1:08
4. "Haitian Suite: Petro" – 4:08
5. "Haitian Suite: Yanvalloux" – 3:05
6. "Haitian Suite: Mascaron" – 3:49
7. "Haitian Suite: Coumbite (Merci Bon Dieu)" – 3:18
8. "Prelude #1" – 1:04
9. "Merengue" – 1:32
10. "Improvisation" – 1:36
11. "Chanson" – 1:53
12. "Congo" – 3:15
13. "Dance (On Sunday)" – 3:17
14. "Serenade Lointaine" – 2:27
15. "Valse" – 4:13
16. "Untitled" – 1:40
17. "Romance" – 2:05
18. "Dance of the Hounsies" – 2:51
19. "Romance 1978" – 1:43

== Personnel ==
- Marc Ribot – acoustic guitar
