= Your Turn =

Studio album by Marc Ribot
- Released: April 30, 2013
- Genre: Rock, Jazz
- Length: 51:56
- Label: Northern Spy
- Producer: Greg Saunier

Marc Ribot chronology
Silent Movies (2010)	Your Turn (2013)	Live at the Village Vanguard (2014)

Your Turn is a studio album by American guitarist Marc Ribot's Ceramic Dog which was released in April 2013 on Northern Spy Records.

== Reception ==
Professional ratings
Aggregate scores
Source	Rating
Metacritic	88/100
Review scores
Source	Rating
Allmusic	4.5/5 stars
PopMatters	8/10 stars

Metacritic assigned album an aggregate score of 88 out of 100 based on 5 critical reviews. The Allmusic review by Sean Westergaard awarded the album 4½ stars out of 5, stating, "The whole album is a blast. Ribot's vocals have never been anything to write home about, but they suit this material perfectly. Instrumentally, this band can do nearly anything. Party Intellectuals may have set the bar high, but Your Turn is definitely a worthy follow-up". PopMatters' John Garratt rated the album 8 out of 10, saying, "Your Turn is the result of more than one stab at nailing down the band’s true sound. This could explain why the album, even in its “fun” instrumental moments, comes out sounding so punchy and cynical. With caustic properties that could rival your favorite punk record, Your Turn will leave you exhausted". Writing for All About Jazz, Troy Collins stated, "An uneven, but engaging record, Your Turn inadvertently suggests rhetorical connotations. In this age of ephemeral downloading and selective listening, Ribot has offered up a mixed release that begs to be cherry-picked, unintentionally nullifying some of his most salient arguments in the process".

== Track listing ==
No.	Title	Writer(s)	Length
1.	"Lies My Body Told Me"	Marc Ribot	5:30
2.	"Your Turn"	Shahzad Ismaily, Marc Ribot, Ches Smith	3:58
3.	"Masters of the Internet"	Marc Ribot	4:04
4.	"Ritual Slaughter"	Shahzad Ismaily, Marc Ribot, Ches Smith	4:04
5.	"Avanti Popolo"	Carlo Tuzzi/traditional	0:57
6.	"Ain't Gonna Let Them Turn Us Around"	Marc Ribot	3:53
7.	"Bread and Roses"	James Oppenheim	5:17
8.	"Prayer"	Marc Ribot	5:39
9.	"Mr. Pants Goes to Hollywood"	Marc Ribot	4:31
10.	"The Kid is Back"	Marc Ribot	3:06
11.	"Take 5"	Paul Desmond	5:25
12.	"We Are the Professionals"	Shahzad Ismaily, Marc Ribot, Ches Smith	3:53
13.	"Special Snowflake"	Ches Smith	1:39

== Personnel ==
Ceramic Dog

- Marc Ribot – guitar, vocals, banjo on track 3, bass and melodica on track 5, horn on tracks 3, 5, 11 and 12, trumpet on tracks 3 and 12
- Shahzad Ismaily – bass, synthesizer, vocals, additional guitar on track 1, keyboards on tracks 3 and 13, sampling on track 3, Moog synthesizer on track 5
- Ches Smith – drums, percussion, electronics, vocals, keyboards on track 13

Additional musicians

- Eszter Balint – vocals on tracks 1, 6 and 10, melodica on track 9, organ on track 10, violin on track 13
- Dan Willis – Oboe and zurna on track 3
- Keefus Ciancia – sampling on tracks 3, 7, 8 and 12
- Arto Lindsay – guitar on track 10

Production

- Greg Saunier – production and mixing
