= Exercises in Futility (Marc Ribot album) =

Studio album by Marc Ribot
- Released: February 25, 2008
- Genre: Avant-garde jazz
- Length: 61:30
- Label: Tzadik
- Producer: Marc Ribot

Marc Ribot chronology
Asmodeus: Book of Angels Volume 7 (2007)	Exercises in Futility (2008)	Party Intellectuals (2008)

Exercises in Futility is a 2008 album of solo guitar recorded by Marc Ribot and released on Tzadik Records' Composer Series. It features compositions that Ribot wrote as "setups for improvising" that "teach guitarists how to play with and in spite of futility".

== Track listing ==
All compositions are by Marc Ribot.

1. "Etude No. 1. Five Gestures" – 5:47
2. "Etude No. 2. Morton 1" – 4:59
3. "Etude No. 3. Elvis" – 4:04
4. "Etude No. 4. Bombasto" – 2:53
5. "Etude No. 5. Lame" – 3:47
6. "Etude No. 6. Cowboy" – 1:46
7. "Etude No. 7. Ballad" – 2:53
8. "Etude No. 8. Groove?" – 3:14
9. "Etude No. 9. Morton 2" – 3:20
10. "Etude No. 10. Min" – 1:23
11. "Etude No. 11. Ascending" – 2:03
12. "Etude No. 12. Mirror" – 4:21
13. "Etude No. 13. Wank" – 4:20
14. "Etude No. 14. Event on 10th Avenue" – 1:18
15. "The Joy of Repetition" – 9:49

== Personnel ==
- Marc Ribot – guitars
