= The Book of Heads =

Studio album by John Zorn/Marc Ribot
- Released: Oct 1995
- Recorded: 1995
- Genre: Avant-garde
- Length: 56:00
- Label: Tzadik TZ 7009
- Producer: John Zorn

John Zorn chronology
Nani Nani (1995)	The Book of Heads (1995)	Filmworks II: Music for an Untitled Film by Walter Hill (1995)

Marc Ribot chronology
Subsonic 1: Sounds of a Distant Episode (1994)	The Book of Heads (1995)	Don't Blame Me (1995)

The Book of Heads (1978), composed by John Zorn, is a set of 35 etudes for solo guitar. It was recorded and released in 1995, and featured Marc Ribot. The pieces use multiple extended techniques.

Condensed from roughly 80 other compositions, the work was originally composed for Eugene Chadbourne. Zorn learned the extended techniques from Chadbourne, and used them to create a piece that would push Chadbourne's virtuosity to new levels. Zorn incorporated new techniques, such as rubbing balloons on the guitar strings until they pop, holding talking dolls up to the microphone, pulling the guitar strings out of the bridge notch, hitting the strings with pencils, and playing with rice. He also used classical guitar techniques, such as hitting the body of the guitar and multiple harmonics.

A second complete recording of all 35 etudes by German guitarist Christoph Funabashi was released on the Berlin-based label schraum in 2012. Ten of the pieces are also featured on Marco Capelli’s YUN MU from 2002. In 2015 another complete edition was released on Tzadik by New York guitarist James Moore who worked with Zorn on the pieces. This one also contains a DVD with a film by Stephen Taylor. In recent years there has been growing interest in The Book of Heads with performances by adventurous guitarists throughout the world – notably Alessandra Novaga in Italy and Kobe Van Cauwenberghe in France.

== Score ==
The score of The Book of Heads is published by Theatre of Musical Optics (BMI) and is available through Hips Road Edition. It consists of a set of 35 small cards with graphical and standard notation including written instructions – which are in some cases very detailed and precise and in others quite associative which leaves a good deal of the realization up to the performer. A general note prefacing the score says: “These ‘heads’ are meant to be played as written and serve as the basis for improvisation. The improv may occur before, after, both before and after, in between two different heads or the same head twice, or not at all during your performance.”

== Reception ==
The Allmusic review by Satcia Proefrock awarded the Ribot album 3 stars stating "Ribot is obviously having fun on this release, and he has been praised by Zorn for the care he took in its execution. Such erratic work could be tossed off as mere noodling, but Ribot puts his heart into this performance and it shows". Chain D.L.K. described Funabashi’s record as “a wonderfully schizophrenic music box” and stated that “Funabashi lays down a finely crafted and creatively virtuosic interpretation of one of Zorn's most demanding works.”

Professional ratings
Review scores
Source	Rating
Allmusic	3/5 stars
Chain D.L.K.	4.5/5 stars

== Track listing ==
All compositions by John Zorn

1. "Etude 1" – 2:44
2. "Etude 2" – 0:32
3. "Etude 3" – 0:39
4. "Etude 4" – 2:04
5. "Etude 5" – 2:46
6. "Etude 6" – 1:02
7. "Etude 7" – 2:36
8. "Etude 8" – 1:25
9. "Etude 9" – 1:10
10. "Etude 10" – 0:31
11. "Etude 11" – 2:04
12. "Etude 12" – 1:51
13. "Etude 13" – 2:18
14. "Etude 14" – 0:38
15. "Etude 15" – 1:58
16. "Etude 16" – 1:27
17. "Etude 17" – 0:46
18. "Etude 18" – 0:27
19. "Etude 19" – 0:42
20. "Etude 20" – 1:20
21. "Etude 21" – 2:20
22. "Etude 22" – 1:51
23. "Etude 23" – 3:08
24. "Etude 24" – 1:52
25. "Etude 25" – 0:58
26. "Etude 26" – 0:37
27. "Etude 27" – 1:29
28. "Etude 28" – 3:08
29. "Etude 29" – 2:11
30. "Etude 30" – 2:50
31. "Etude 31" – 1:09
32. "Etude 32" – 1:30
33. "Etude 33" – 1:22
34. "Etude 34" – 1:18
35. "Etude 35" – 1:24

- Recorded at Shelley Palmer Studio in New York City on March 19, 1995

== Personnel ==
- Jason Baker – engineer
- Ikue Mori – cover design
- David Newgarden – producer
- Allan Tucker – mastering
- John Zorn – collage, producer
