= Scelsi Morning =

Studio album by Marc Ribot
- Released: August 26, 2003
- Recorded: January–April, 2000
- Genre: Avant-garde jazz, experimental music
- Length: 53:10
- Label: Tzadik
- Producer: Marc Ribot

Marc Ribot chronology
Masada Guitars (2003)	Scelsi Morning (2003)	Soundtracks Volume 2 (2003)

Scelsi Morning is a 2003 album by Marc Ribot released on Tzadik Records.

== Reception ==
The Allmusic review by Sean Westergaard states, "Taken as a whole, Scelsi Morning is not really an easy listen (although a couple of the tracks are wonderful), but it certainly is impressive".

Professional ratings
Review scores
Source	Rating
Allmusic	3/5 stars

== Track listing ==
All compositions by Marc Ribot.

1. "Bataille" – 4:56
2. "Scelsi Morning" - 6:25
3. "And Then She Fell..." – 1:26
4. "Earth" – 4:01
5. "Pennies from Hell" – 4:59
6. "Geese" – 12:14
7. "Our Daily Bread" – 3:27
8. "Identity I-Shmentity" – 6:47
9. "The Youth Brigade Triumphs Again (And Again)" – 5:14
10. "Kabukitsch" – 3:23
- Tracks 1–3, 5, and 6 were recorded at Sorcerer Sound, New York City in April 2000.
- Track 4 was recorded at Sperry Sound, New York City in April 2000.
- Tracks 7–10 were recorded at Sorcerer Sound, New York City in January 2000.

== Personnel ==
- Marc Ribot – guitar
- Christine Bard (1, 7–10) – percussion, drums
- Roberto Rodriguez (1, 4) – percussion, drums
- Ned Rothenberg (1, 2, 5, 6) – bass clarinet, clarinet
- Jill Jaffe (1, 2, 6) – violin, viola
- Chris Wood (1, 2, 5) – bass
- Anthony Coleman (1, 5, 7–10) – pump organ, piano, sampler, trombone
- Ted Reichman (2, 6) – pump organ, accordion
- Eddie Sperry (4) – sampler
- Rob Thomas (7–10) – violin, bass
