= YRU Still Here? =

Studio album by Marc Ribot's Ceramic Dog
- Released: April 27, 2018
- Studio: Brooklyn Recording, Figure 8 Recording and Studio G, Brooklyn, NY
- Genre: Rock, Jazz
- Length: 53:41
- Label: Northern Spy
- Producer: Marc Ribot

Marc Ribot chronology
The Young Philadelphians: Live in Tokyo (2015)	YRU Still Here? (2018)	Songs of Resistance 1942-2018 (2018)

YRU Still Here? is a studio album by American guitarist Marc Ribot's Ceramic Dog which was released in April 2018 on Northern Spy Records.

== Reception ==
Professional ratings
Review scores
Source	Rating
Allmusic	4.5/5 stars
PopMatters	8/10 stars

The Allmusic review awarded the album 4½ stars out of 5 with Matt Collar stating, "the pugilistic, stylistically expansive third album from Ceramic Dog, guitarist/singer Ribot's punk-infused trio with bassist/singer Shahzad Ismaily and drummer/singer Ches Smith. Grounded by Ribot's mutative, buzzy guitar lines and the band's taut, often humorous lyrics piping with literate rage, YRU Still Here? has the feel of an '80s hardcore punk 7" recorded on a four-track over an intense few hours. While the band's dissonant, MC5-esque brand of punk, improvisational jazz, and avant-garde rock has always evinced a kind of leftist artistic ire, it's never been as overtly politically and socially minded as it is here".

PopMatters' John Garratt rated the album 8 out of 10, saying, "Ceramic Dog slammed their collective hand onto a truly volatile moment to capture some appropriately volatile music. In a time when nationalism seems to be far too en vouge for comfort, you can always count on certain voices being raised (shouted?). Ribot was one of those voices before, and there's no way he's going to shut up now. ... the album's undercurrent muddies the water just enough to remind the listener that Marc Ribot and Ceramic Dog will never take the easy way out, even during the best of times. Sometimes, that's how you stumble upon a future classic".

== Track listing ==
No.	Title	Writer(s)	Length
1.	"Personal Nancy"	Marc Ribot, Ches Smith	2:58
2.	"Pennsylvania 6 6666"	Shahzad Ismaily, Marc Ribot	6:15
3.	"Agnes"	Marc Ribot, Ches Smith	3:22
4.	"Oral Sidney With a "U""	Marc Ribot	4:05
5.	"YRU Still Here?"	Marc Ribot	4:44
6.	"Muslim Jewish Resistance"	Marc Ribot	5:07
7.	"Shut That Kid Up"	Marc Ribot	8:22
8.	"Fuck la Migra"	Marc Ribot	2:54
9.	"Orthodoxy"	Marc Ribot	5:11
10.	"Freak Freak Freak on the Peripherique"	Marc Ribot, Shahzad Ismaily	4:51
11.	"Rawhide"	Marc Ribot	5:52

== Personnel ==
Ceramic Dog

- Marc Ribot – guitar, Requinto guitar, Farfisa organ, bass, horn, vocoder, vocals
- Shahzad Ismaily – bass, Moog synthesizer, percussion, vocals
- Ches Smith – drums, percussion, electronics, vocals

Additional musicians

- Curtis Fowlkes – trombone (tracks 2 & 7)
- Doug Wieselman – saxophone, flute (tracks 2 & 8)
- Briggan Krauss – saxophone (track 6)
- Neel Murgai – sitar (track 9)
- Mauricio Herrera – congas (track 2)
- Lukas Rutzen (tracks 2 & 8), Rea Dubach (tracks 2, 6 & 8) – backing vocals

Production

- Ron Saint Germain – mixing
- Scott Hull – mastering
