= Shrek (album) =

Studio album by Marc Ribot
- Released: 1994
- Recorded: 1994
- Studios: Low Blood Studios, Ludlow Street, New York City
- Genre: Avant-garde jazz
- Length: 58:53
- Label: Avant
- Producers: Marc Anthony Thompson, Marc Ribot

Marc Ribot chronology
Subsonic 1: Sounds of a Distant Episode (1994)	Shrek (1994)	Don't Blame Me (1995)

Shrek is a 1994 album by Marc Ribot recorded and released by the Japanese Avant label in 1994.

== Recording ==
The album was recorded in New York City at Low Blood Studios. Ribot stated "I made Shrek, which was finally a hit. It was the most purely compositional record I had made. It’s quasi-unlistenable. ... I never knew how many Shrek fans there were till I did Cubanos. They’re coming out of the woodwork."

== Reception ==
Professional ratings
Review scores
Source	Rating
AllMusic	3/5 stars

AllMusic awarded the album 3 stars with reviewer Sean Cooper stating, "The group's debut shifts restlessly among animated jazz, rock, punk, and warped blues themes, filling the inevitable cracks with instrumental textures, minimal vignettes, and formless noise, similar in some respects to John Zorn's Naked City (though with considerably more focus...hell, with focus period!). The group is joined on three tracks by sampler collage artist David Shea. ".

In JazzTimes Tom Terrell said "Shrek is firmly in the avant garde camp. Over ten tracks, Ribot and Shrek the band cause wreck, eschewing identifiably standard song structures for a blurry continuum of multi-layered sounds, skewed rhythms and extraterrestrial transmissions. An intense exercise in wild gravity, Shrek careens madly from the pointillistic Frippertronics of 'Forth World' to the grim claustrophobia of 'Romance.' Well worth the listen-just don't look for a melody".

== Track listing ==
All tracks are written by Marc Ribot, except where it is noted.

No.	Title	Writer(s)	Length
1.	"Prelude"	Frantz Casseus	1:17
2.	"Spigot"		2:57
3.	"Forth World"		7:53
4.	"Romance"		6:29
5.	"Hoist the Bloody Icon High"		4:40
6.	"Half Ass Whole"	Marc Anthony Thompson, Marc Ribot	3:44
7.	"Big Money"		4:45
8.	"Shrek"		6:17
9.	"Human Sacrifice"		10:43
10.	"Bells"	Albert Ayler	10:08
Total length:			58:53

== Personnel ==
- Marc Ribot – guitars, banjo, Eb horn, drums, pump organ
- Chris Wood – guitar on all tracks except "Prelude" and "Half Ass Whole"
- David Shea – sampler on "Spigot", "Half Ass Whole" and "Human Sacrifice"
- Sebastian Steinberg – bass on all tracks except "Prelude" and "Half Ass Whole"
- Jim Pugliese – drums on all tracks except "Prelude" and "Half Ass Whole"
- Christine Bard – drums on all tracks except "Prelude", "Spigot" and "Half Ass Whole"
- Marc Anthony Thompson – autoharp on "Half Ass Whole"
