= Spiritual Unity (Marc Ribot album) =

Studio album by Marc Ribot
- Released: May 3, 2005
- Recorded: October 27–28, 2004
- Genre: Avant-garde jazz, free jazz, experimental music
- Length: 52:47
- Label: Pi Recordings
- Producer: Marc Ribot

Marc Ribot chronology
Soundtracks Volume 2 (2003)	Spiritual Unity (2005)	Asmodeus: Book of Angels Volume 7 (2007)

Spiritual Unity is a 2005 album by guitarist Marc Ribot released on Pi Recordings. The album features compositions by saxophonist Albert Ayler who Ribot identifies as a significant influence. Bassist Henry Grimes who plays on the album had earlier recorded with Ayler. It was recorded at Orange Music Sound Studio, West Orange, New Jersey on October 28, 2004, except "Bells", which was recorded live at Tonic in New York City on October 27, 2004.

== Reception ==
The Allmusic review by Sean Westergaard awarded the album 4 stars, stating, "Ayler's time on earth was far too short, but Ribot and company show that this music still lives on in the present moment, not simply as a relic of the past. Spiritual Unity isn't for the timid, but Ayler fans will find a lot to enjoy".

Professional ratings
Review scores
Source	Rating
Allmusic	4/5 stars

== Track listing ==
All compositions are by Albert Ayler, except where noted.

1. "Invocation" (Ribot) – 9:17
2. "Spirits" – 8:25
3. "Truth Is Marching In" – 12:50
4. "Saints" – 6:43
5. "Bells" – 15:32

== Personnel ==
- Roy Campbell – trumpet, pocket trumpet
- Marc Ribot – guitar
- Henry Grimes – bass
- Chad Taylor – drums

== See also ==
Spiritual Unity
