= Silent Movies =

Studio album by Marc Ribot
- Released: September 28, 2010
- Length: 60:32
- Label: Pi
- Producer: JD Foster

Marc Ribot chronology
Party Intellectuals (2008)	Silent Movies (2010)	Your Turn (2013)

Silent Movies are 13 solo guitar compositions by Marc Ribot released September 28, 2010 on Pi Recordings.

== Reception ==
Professional ratings
Aggregate scores
Source	Rating
Metacritic	87/100
Review scores
Source	Rating
AllMusic	4/5 stars
The Boston Phoenix	4/4 stars
Los Angeles Times	3/4 stars
PopMatters	9/10
Rolling Stone	4/5 stars
Tom Hull	B+
DownBeat	3.5/5 stars

The album received universal acclaim, with Metacritic giving it a score of 87% from 7 reviews. The AllMusic review by Thom Jurek awarded the album 4 stars, stating, "For those interested in one of the more compelling and quietly provocative and graceful guitar records of 2010, Silent Movies is well worth seeking out". PopMatters correspondent Will Layman said, "Marc Ribot really ought to have the opportunity to score films more often, because the results can be breathtaking". Rolling Stone's Will Hermes observed, "he indulges the yearning melodic sensibility that hides hooks in even his noisiest recordings, and increasingly defines his playing". Bob Gendron gave the album 3.5 stars in his review for DownBeat. Gendron wrote, "Ribot’s use of space and quiet pauses complements the meditative progressions".

== Track listing ==
All compositions by Marc Ribot, aside from track 13 written by Hubert Giraud.

1. "Variation 1" – 1:51
2. "Delancey Waltz" – 3:18
3. "Flicker" – 5:22
4. "Empty" – 2:04
5. "Natalia in E-Flat Major" – 5:16
6. "Solaris" – 3:47
7. "Requiem for a Revolution" – 5:31
8. "Fat Man Blues" – 4:49
9. "Bateau" – 4:59
10. "Radio" – 4:05
11. "Postcards from N.Y." – 8:31
12. "The Kid" – 4:16
13. "Sous le Ciel de Paris" – 6:46

== Personnel ==
- Marc Ribot – guitar, vibraphone (12)
- Keefus Ciancia – soundscapes (1, 3, 7, 11, 13)
- JD Foster – producer
