= Requiem for What's His Name =

Studio album by Marc Ribot
- Released: 1992
- Recorded: 1992
- Genre: Experimental music
- Length: 50:51
- Label: Les Disques du Crepuscule
- Producer: Marc Ribot

Marc Ribot chronology
Rootless Cosmopolitans (1990)	Requiem for What's His Name (1992)	Marc Ribot Plays Solo Guitar Works of Frantz Casseus (1993)

Requiem for What's His Name is the second album by Marc Ribot & The Rootless Cosmopolitans which was released by the Belgian label Les Disques du Crepuscule in 1992.

== Recording ==
The album was recorded in New York City at Sound on Sound Recording except "Commit a Crime" which was recorded live at Desi Stadtteilzentrum in Nuremberg, Germany. Ribot stated "On the next record, Requiem for What’s His Name, the focus moved towards composition. It’s almost impossible to get hold of it. I was interested in Balkan music at the time, certain ritual music ... in finding stuff I could do without ironic distance. For example, on Requiem for What’s His Name, I covered “Sometimes I Feel like a Motherless Child,” one of the sadder songs in the world. I couldn’t do it without distance, but I wanted to make that distance painful, bring it to some kind of breaking point".

== Reception ==
The Allmusic review by Brian Beatty awarded the album 4 stars, stating, "On his second release as a bandleader, guitarist Marc Ribot is joined by players familiar from his gigs as a hired sideman, including saxophonist Roy Nathanson of the Lounge Lizards and the Jazz Passengers and multi-reed player Ralph Carney from Tom Waits' touring band. Though less swinging and fresh than 1990's Rootless Cosmopolitans, this album's original compositions and renditions of Duke Ellington and Howlin' Wolf tunes still leave plenty of room for Ribot's discordant guitar stylings".

Professional ratings
Review scores
Source	Rating
Allmusic	4/5 stars

== Track listing ==
All compositions are by Marc Ribot, except where indicated otherwise.

1. "Requiem for What's His Name" – 4:29
2. "Disposable Head" – 2:50
3. "Clever White Youths" – 4:30
4. "First Time Every Time" – 2:01
5. "Motherless Child" (Anonymous) – 1:06
6. "New" – 4:18
7. "Reveille" – 1:08
8. "Lamonte's Nightmare" (Anthony Coleman) – 5:56
9. "March" – 2:00
10. "Pony" (Ribot, Coleman) – 2:14
11. "Yo, I Killed Your God" – 2:39
12. "Commit A Crime" (Chester Burnett) – 3:19
13. "Caravan" (Juan Tizol, Duke Ellington, Irving Mills) – 3:48
14. "Blues" – 3:11
15. "1 Adolph 12" (Ribot, Jones) – 6:57

== Personnel ==
- Marc Ribot – guitars, vocals, E-flat horn, piano, drum sequencing
- Wilbo Wright (1, 2, 7–8, 11, 13) – detuned guitar (on (1)), bass
- Roy Nathanson (1, 2, 4, 6, 9, 13, 15) – soprano, chermia, alto, tenor
- Ralph Carney (1–4, 6–9, 11–12, 14) – alto, sona, tenor, clarinet, assorted duck calls
- Anthony Coleman (1–3, 6–8, 10–14) – pump organ, sampler, piano, organ
- Simeon Cain (1–4, 6–9, 11, 13, 15) – drums, percussion, drum overdubs
- Syd Straw (3, 10) – background vocals, vocals
- Zeena Parkins (6) – electric harp
- Brad Jones (6, 15) – bass
- Greg Jones (12, 14) – bass
- Rock Savage (12, 14) – drums
- J.D. Parran (15) – clarinet
