= Live at the Village Vanguard (Marc Ribot album) =

Live album by Marc Ribot Trio
- Released: May 13, 2014
- Recorded: June 30, 2012
- Venue: Village Vanguard, New York City
- Genre: Jazz
- Length: 1:34:18
- Label: Pi; Pi 53
- Producer: Chad Taylor

Marc Ribot chronology
Your Turn (2013)	Live at the Village Vanguard (2014)	The Young Philadelphians: Live in Tokyo (2015)

Live at the Village Vanguard is a live album by Marc Ribot's Trio which was released in May 2014 on the Pi label.

== Reception ==
Professional ratings
Review scores
Source	Rating
AllMusic	4/5 stars
All About Jazz	4.5/5 stars
All About Jazz	4.5/5 stars
PopMatters	8/10

The Allmusic review by Mark Deming states, "the communication between the players is total, with each in full flight as individuals and as a group, honoring the masters and finding a voice of their own at the same time". Writing for All About Jazz, Dan Bilawsaky said, "It would be overstating things to say that Ribot's engagement at the Village Vanguard, and this album documenting it, signal mass acceptance of his work. It wouldn't, however, be unfair to say that they indicate a growing audience for his magnificent and multifaceted artistry," while Mark Corroto stated, "Ribot's guitar work is unapologetically unrefined and original". PopMatters' Will Layman stated, "The guitar sound isn’t warm and bell-like in the manner of Wes Montgomery, but rather something more like an earlier jazz player’s scratch and scrape. When the trio plays the melody slowly and loping, it sounds like real emotion. And that’s as good a summary as I can find of all of this music: really emotional. Some is raucous and some is tender, but it’s all about what’s real and feeling".

== Track listing ==
1. "Dearly Beloved" (John Coltrane) - 15:06
2. "The Wizard" (Albert Ayler) - 7:59
3. "Ol' Man River" (Oscar Hammerstein II, Jerome Kern) - 6:37
4. "Bells" (Ayler) - 19:09
5. "I'm Confessin' (That I Love You)" (Doc Daugherty, Al J. Neiburg, Ellis Reynolds) - 8:12
6. "Sun Ship" (Coltrane) - 7:15
7. "Amen" (Marc Ribot) - 12:20
8. "Fat Man Blues" (Marc Ribot) - 9:44
9. "Saints" (Marc Ribot) - 8:02

== Personnel ==
- Marc Ribot – guitar
- Henry Grimes - bass
- Chad Taylor - drums
