= The Young Philadelphians: Live in Tokyo =

Live album by Marc Ribot and The Young Philadelphians
- Released: November 27, 2015
- Recorded: July 28, 2014
- Venue: Club Quattro, Tokyo, Japan
- Genre: Harmolodic disco
- Length: 53:54
- Label: Yellowbird

Marc Ribot chronology
Live at the Village Vanguard (2014)	The Young Philadelphians: Live in Tokyo (2015)	YRU Still Here? (2018)

The Young Philadelphians: Live in Tokyo is a live album by Marc Ribot's Young Philadelphians which was recorded in Japan in 2014 and released on the Enja Records Yellowbird label.

== Reception ==
Professional ratings
Review scores
Source	Rating
All About Jazz	4.5/5 stars
The Irish Times	4/5 stars

Writing for All About Jazz, Mark Corroto stated, "The left turn here is Ribot's logical mish-mash (not an oxymoron) of classic Philly soul with elements of Ornette Coleman's electric Prime Time band. ... The disc is packed full of rump shaking steak and cheese party sounds". The Irish Times' Cormac Larkin stated, "The result is a boisterous romp of an album, like a disco recording from some dystopian, alternative universe".

== Track listing ==
1. "Love Epidemic" (The Trammps) – 5:21
2. "Love TKO" (Teddy Pendergrass) – 6:47
3. "Fly, Robin, Fly" (Silver Convention) – 9:05
4. "TSOP (The Sound of Philadelphia)" (MFSB) – 9:22
5. "Love Rollercoaster" (Ohio Players) – 7:22
6. "Do It Anyway You Wanna" (People's Choice) – 6:46
7. "The Hustle" (Van McCoy) – 9:14

== Personnel ==
- Marc Ribot, Mary Halvorson – guitar
- Jamaaladeen Tacuma – bass
- G. Calvin Weston – drums
- Yoshie Kajiwara – violin
- Takako Siba – viola
- China Azuma – cello
