= Roberto Juan Rodríguez =

Cuban-American jazz musician

Roberto Juan Rodríguez (Havana) is a Cuban-American jazz musician who is known for fusion of Latin music and Jewish Klezmer elements. Although not Jewish his father's Latin band regularly played at Jewish theatre, weddings and bar mitzvahs in Miami, giving the young percussionist an interest in Jewish music. In the 1980s he moved to New York, recording with Marc Ribot, as the drummer for Ribot's Los Cubanos Postizos, and John Zorn.

== Discography ==
- El Danzon de Moises (Tzadik, 2002)
- Baila! Gitano Baila! (Tzadik, 2004)
- with Irving Fields - Oy Vey!!!...Olé!!! (Tzadik, 2006)
- with Maurice El Médioni - Descarga Oriental (Piranha, 2006)
- The First Basket (Tzadik, 2009)
- Aguares: Book of Angels Volume 23 (Tzadik, 2014)
