= Rootless Cosmopolitans =

Studio album by Marc Ribot
- Released: 1990
- Recorded: 1990
- Studio: Sound On Sound Recording and Harold Dessau, New York, and Port-A-Studio
- Genre: Experimental, alternative, avant garde, electronic, hardcore punk, no wave, classical, free jazz
- Length: 46:27
- Label: Antilles; AN 8749
- Producer: Arthur Moorehead

Marc Ribot chronology
Rootless Cosmopolitans (1990)	Requiem for What's His Name (1992)

Rootless Cosmopolitans is the debut solo album by American guitarist Marc Ribot, released by Antilles in 1990.

== Background ==
From 1979 Ribot was gaining recognition as a sideman working with pick-up bands for R&B artists like Brother Jack McDuff, Wilson Pickett, Carla and Rufus Thomas, and Chuck Berry. In 1984 he became a member of John Lurie's Lounge Lizards and shortly after contributed strongly to Tom Waits's Rain Dogs (1985). Ribot worked with Waits on subsequent albums and tours and contributed to recordings by Elvis Costello and the Jazz Passengers, and John Zorn before recording his first album.

== Recording ==
The album was recorded in New York City at Sound on Sound Recording except "I Should Care", which was recorded at Harold Desau, and "While My Guitar Gently Weeps", recorded by Ribot on a cassette-tape Port-A-Studio. Ribot stated "Rootless Cosmopolitans was the first record I had real control over. It's a walking tour through all these different styles that had meant something to me emotionally as a side musician".

== Reception ==
Professional ratings
Review scores
Source	Rating
AllMusic	3/5 stars
The Penguin Guide to Jazz	3/4 stars

Critic Robert Christgau identified Ribot's version of "While My Guitar Gently Weeps" as "A Choice Cut" – a good song on an album that isn't worth your time or money.

In The Village Voice, Gary Giddins called it "a notable record" observing that "his key associates are Don Byron and Anthony Coleman and the repertory covers Hendrix and George Harrison as well as two songs – 'I Should Care' and 'Mood Indigo' – that are known not least for brooding interpretations by Monk. Rootless Cosmopolitans offers mostly originals that shriek and rumble and clatter with unexpected amiability, but in the pause-and-conquer strategy of those two songs, especially the 77-second 'I Should Care', Ribot suggested a new potential in his playing."

The AllMusic review by Brian Olewnick stated: "There is a decent amount of enjoyable music here, but it's hit and miss, very much a grab-bag affair. All of the musicians involved went on to do finer work later in their careers, though, so what value Rootless Cosmopolitans retains tends toward the historical." Elsewhere's Graham Reid noted, "None of the interpretations will appeal to jazz or rock listeners at a guess. They are sometimes disturbingly aggressive decon/reconstructions of the source material, their version of 'Mood Indigo' the most respectful ... for a while. ... Perhaps that's why you're better to undertake this post-modern stuff without reference to the titles and just listen to the wit, ingenuity and challenge the album offers." The Penguin Guide to Jazz commented that "much of the record is given over to pseudo-rock productions that wouldn't pass as demos in Chartsville".

== Track listing ==
All tracks are written by Marc Ribot except where noted.

No.	Title	Writer(s)	Length
1.	"I Should Care"	Sammy Cahn, Axel Stordahl, Paul Weston	1:17
2.	"Shortly After Takeoff"		4:14
3.	"The Wind Cries Mary"	Jimi Hendrix	5:01
4.	"Friendly Ghosts"		5:20
5.	"The Cocktail Party"	Brad Jones, Ribot, Richie Schwarz	4:59
6.	"New Sad"		3:01
7.	"A Mind Is a Terrible Thing to Waste"		1:13
8.	"Beak Lunch Manifesto"	Jones, Ribot	6:31
9.	"While My Guitar Gently Weeps"	George Harrison	1:57
10.	"Nature Abhors a Vacuum Cleaner"		4:31
11.	"Mood Indigo"	Barney Bigard, Duke Ellington, Irving Mills	4:40
12.	"Have a Nice Day"		3:43

- Track 12 does not appear on the original LP.

== Personnel ==
- Marc Ribot – guitars, harmonica, vocal
- Curtis Fowlkes (5, 10) – trombone
- Roy Nathanson (5, 8, 10, 12) – saxophone
- Don Byron (2, 4, 6, 7, 10, 11, 12) – bass clarinet, clarinet, turkey calls
- Anthony Coleman (2, 3, 4, 7, 10, 11, 12) – keyboards, piano, organ, sampler
- Arto Lindsay (3, 8) – guitar
- David Sardi (10) – guitar
- Brad Jones (4, 5, 7, 8, 10, 11, 12) – bass, guitar on (11)
- Melvin Gibbs (2, 3, 6) – bass, guitar
- Richie Schwarz (2, 3, 4, 5, 7, 8, 10, 11, 12) – drums, sampled percussion
- Michael Blair (3, 5) – drums, backwards vocal
- Ralph Carney (3) – sona
