= Party Intellectuals =

Studio album by Marc Ribot's Ceramic Dog
- Released: 24 June 2008
- Recorded: October 2007
- Genre: Rock, jazz
- Label: Pi Recordings
- Producer: Joel Hamilton

Marc Ribot chronology
Exercises in Futility (2008)	Party Intellectuals (2008)	Silent Movies (2010)

Party Intellectuals is the debut album by jazz fusion trio Marc Ribot's Ceramic Dog. It was produced by Joel Hamilton and released June 24, 2008 on Pi Recordings.

== Reception ==
Professional ratings
Aggregate scores
Source	Rating
Metacritic	80/100
Review scores
Source	Rating
Allmusic	4.5/5 stars
PopMatters	7/10 stars

Response was generally positive, with Metacritic assigning the album an aggregate score of 80 out of 100 based on 10 critical reviews indicating "Generally favorable reviews".

The Allmusic review by Sean Westergaard awarded the album 4½ stars out of 5, stating, "Although Ribot has always displayed a great sense of humor, it's on full display here in a way it hasn't really been before. Party Intellectuals is easily Ribot's most fun album to date and one of his best".

PopMatters' Zeth Lundy rated the album 7 out of 10, saying,

Ceramic Dog is Ribot's first true rock band to call his own, but it’s also an experiment in accessible dissonance—a rock band that spikes the rudimentary nature of the form with aggressive improvisation and noodly turbulence ... The more challenging tracks on Party Intellectuals are the epic mood pieces that freak out in frame-by-frame slow motion ... While a lot of the tracks on Party Intellectuals delight in ripping conventions apart (or, in the case of those epic tracks, deliriously attempt to discover some new ones), most also allow for some truly batshit crazy guitar solos by Ribot.

== Track listing ==
All compositions are by Marc Ribot, except where noted.

1. "Break On Through" (John Densmore, Robbie Krieger, Ray Manzarek, Jim Morrison) – 3:44
2. "Party Intellectuals" (Shahzad Ismaily, Ribot, Ches Smith) – 5:50
3. "Todo el Mundo es Kitsch" – 5:11
4. "When We Were Young and We Were Freaks" (Emilio Cubierto, Ismaily, Ribot, Smith) – 8:18
5. "Digital Handshake" (Ismaily, Ribot, Smith, Alessandro Stefana) – 10:15
6. "Bateau" – 4:15
7. "For Malena" – 3:20
8. "Pinch" (Ismaily, Ribot, Smith) – 4:43
9. "Girlfriend" (Ismaily, Ribot, Smith) – 3:35
10. "Midost" – 10:04
11. "Shsh Shsh" (Ismaily, Ribot, Jenni Quilter) – 5:49
12. "Never Better" – 3:29

== Personnel ==
- Marc Ribot – guitar, vocals
- Shahzad Ismaily – bass guitar, vocals, Moog synthesizer
- Ches Smith – drum kit, percussion, vocals, electronics
- Janice Cruz – vocals
- Jenni Quilter – vocals
- Martín Verajano – percussion
