= J. D. Foster =

American singer-songwriter

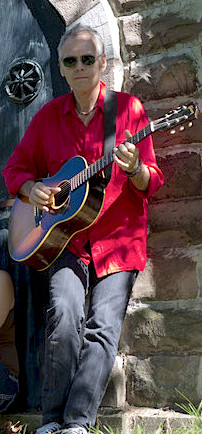
- JD Foster in Ithaca NY 2013

Background information
- Born: August 7, 1953 (age 72); Indiana, United States
- Genres: Rock, alternative country
- Occupations: Musician, songwriter, producer
- Instruments: Bass, guitar, bass clarinet
- Years active: 1986–present

J. D. Foster is an American record producer, bassist, multi-instrumentalist, composer and songwriter. He is known for working with country and Americana performers including Dwight Yoakam and Patty Griffin.

== Producer, performer and recording artist ==
J. D. Foster has produced albums and songs for a wide variety of artists and contributed as a bassist and multi-instrumentalist on many alternative, rock, and country albums. His list of collaborations includes Marc Ribot, Patty Griffin, Calexico, Ronnie Lane, Richard Buckner, Lucinda Williams, Vinicio Capossela, Anna Coogan, 17 Hippies, Il Pan Del Diavolo, Eszter Balint and many more. As well as being a producer, Foster is also a songwriter, musician, and recording artist.

=== From Florida to L.A. ===
J. D. Foster started his career in Central Florida, playing bass with numerous Orlando, Gainesville, and Saint Augustine musicians. He lived in Los Angeles throughout most of the 1980s playing with Dwight Yoakam,Jim Lauderdale, Rosie Flores, Pete Anderson and many other country artists. He started his major label recording career as bassist in L.A. with Dwight Yoakam in 1986. His work with Yoakam earned three platinum albums, saw tours all across America and Europe, as well as appearances on Austin City Limits, Solid Gold, The Tonight Show with Johnny Carson, The Grammys, and various music videos.

During these years Foster also appeared "sidelining" in several TV shows and feature films. In this capacity he worked with artists including: T. G. Sheppard, Ben Vereen, Janie Fricke, Robert Blake, Drew Barrymore, and Madonna in the film Vision Quest.

=== Texas ===
Foster relocated to Austin, Texas in 1988. There he joined The True Believers with Alejandro Escovedo. He also worked with Escovedo & Jon Dee Graham in the Make Believers. Foster played with Ronnie Lane in his Texas version of Slim Chance and appeared in Rupert Williams' documentary The Passing Show: The Life and Music of Ronnie Lane (2006), where he is interviewed about this association. During his Austin tenure, Foster started a band with Danny Barnes and Rich Brotherton, The Barnburners, releasing one recording. He and Brotherton also played regularly with songwriter David Halley. Foster and Halley performed together in different productions of Bad Girls Upset By the Truth, a musical play by Jo Carol Pierce. During this time he worked on recordings with The Silos and tour dates with Lucinda Williams, among others.

=== New York ===
Foster moved to New York City in 1991 and began working with artists in the improvisational scene and has worked closely with Marc Ribot on many projects through the years. He toured the US, Europe, and Japan with Ribot's noise combo Shrek, appearing at events such as the Saalfelden Jazz Festival. Foster again toured Europe and Japan with Green on Red in the early 1990s. They performed on European television, at major venues and rock festivals, including the London Fleadh, Glastonbury Festival, and Roskilde Festival.

In 2004–2005, Foster toured and recorded with Patty Griffin joining her on the Sweet Harmony Traveling Revue tour alongside Emmylou Harris, Buddy Miller, Gillian Welch, and David Rawlings. He also performed with Griffin on Austin City Limits and Late Night with David Letterman. Foster worked on Laura Cantrells' 2005 release before he joined Calexico in the following year. In 2006, he produced the Calexico album Garden Ruin. For the album, his choices for production were "very adventurous in details — using unusual percussion, or wanting to bring in instruments like banjo ukuleles, bass melodica, electric mandolin, and tenor guitar." Foster played bass on T-Bone Burnett's album Tooth of Crime (2008) as well as appearing in the Signature Theatre production of the play in the 1996–1997 season at the Lucille Lortel Theatre.

In 2010, Foster formed The Slummers with Dan Stuart, Antonio Gramentieri, and Diego Sapignoli. They released their debut album Love of the Amateur and toured Europe a year later. In the second half of 2013, Foster worked with the Ithaca-based songwriter Anna Coogan to record a co-written collection of songs for a new album. Foster had produced Coogan's first solo album The Nocturnal Among Us in 2009. The duo performed dates in Germany, Netherlands, London, and New York City in 2014. They were joined by drummer Brian Wilson a.k.a. Willie B. (Johnny Dowd) on several dates. In October 2014, Foster and Coogan released the album Birth of the Stars on Elevate Records.

Foster often performs in the house band of the Radio Free Song Club with David Mansfield and Dave Schramm.

=== Other international collaborations ===
J. D. Foster joined the 17 Hippies in Berlin to take part in the production of Phantom Songs (2011).

In recent years Foster has been working extensively with Italian musicians and is strongly associated with the up-and-coming "Palermo Sound." An Italian record review states: "Tra l'altro Storia Di Una Corsa denota chiaramente un sound moderno ma non per questo in linea con quello prevedibile e gettonato dai progetti musicali più pacchiani e quotati del momento. Determinanti, in tal senso, sono stati i gusti, le scelte, di chi questo disco l'ha prodotto a livello artistico senza tralasciare alcunché: JD Foster, appunto. "

== Awards ==
Foster won the Austin Chronicle Music Awards for producer and bassist of the year for 1989–1990

== Quotes ==
Describing his role as a producer, Foster says:

"I try to speak the same language as the artist. When you're chasing down the overall vibe of a recording, you know, the arrangement, instrumentation, tempo, sound, feel...probably the biggest factor is communication. It's exciting to figure out with the artist and engineer the direct technical way to record the sounds they're hearing in their head. " (2003)

The Australian songwriter Simon Bonney said about Foster in an interview from 1993 :

"J.D. was my tour guide (...). J.D. has a country background, but not exclusively, and he can contribute many other ideas as well. If I'd shown these songs to a purely traditional country musician, that person wouldn't have got it."

Joey Burns (Calexico):

"JD is wonderful. Great to work, hang, listen, talk, go out and be with. He has a lot of experience and at the same time loves the sense of discovery that music can be. He knows how to breathe and reassure people of just how much a gift this whole ball of wax is."

== Partial discography ==
- Guitars, Cadillacs, Etc., Etc., Dwight Yoakam (Reprise Records, 1986)
- Hillbilly Deluxe, Dwight Yoakam (Reprise Records, 1987)
- Surprise, Syd Straw (Virgin Records, 1989)
- Too Much Fun, Green on Red (Off Beat, 1992)
- Please Panic, The Vulgar Boatmen (1992)
- Horseshoes and Hand Grenades, Chris Mars (Smash Records, 1992)
- 75% Less Fat, Chris Mars (Smash Records, 1993)
- Can O'Worms, Dan Stuart (Monkey Hill Records, 1995)
- Opposite Sex, The Vulgar Boatmen (1995)
- Devotion + Doubt, Richard Buckner (MCA Records, 1997)
- Y Los Cubanos Postizos, Marc Ribot (Atlantic Records, 1998)
- Since, Richard Buckner (MCA Records, 1998)
- Flicker, Eszter Balint (1998)
- ¡Muy Divertido!, Marc Ribot (Atlantic Records, 2000)
- The Hill, Richard Buckner (Six Shooter Records, 2000)
- Live in Austin, Ronnie Lane (2000)
- 100 Questions, The Schramms (Blue Rose Records, 2000)
- Saints, Marc Ribot (Atlantic Records, 2001)
- Impossible Dream, Patty Griffin (ATO, 2004)
- Post to Wire, Richmond Fontaine (2004)
- Mud, Eszter Balint (2004)
- Humming by the Flowered Vine, Laura Cantrell (Matador, 2005)
- The Fitzgerald, Richmond Fontaine (2005)
- Garden Ruin, Calexico (Quarterstick, 2006)
- Meadow, Richard Buckner (Merge Records, 2006)
- Thunderbird, Cassandra Wilson, producer of the track "Lost" (Blue Note Records, 2006)
- Children Running Through, Patty Griffin (ATO, 2007)
- Thirteen Cities, Richmond Fontaine (2007)
- Cast Iron Soul, Danny & Dusty (2007)
- Da Solo, Vinicio Capossela (WEA Records, 2008)
- We Used to Think the Freeway Sounded Like a River, Richmond Fontaine (2009)
- Silent Movies, Marc Ribot (PI Records, 2010)
- Sono all'osso, Il Pan del Diavolo (La Tempesta, 2010)
- Love of the Amateur, The Slummers (Blue Rose Records, 2010)
- Rebetiko Gymnastas, Vinicio Capossela (2012)
- Piombo, polvere e carbone, Il Pan del Diavolo (La Tempesta, 2012)
- Birth of the Stars, Anna Coogan & J. D. Foster (Elevate, 2014)
- Airless Midnight, Eszter Balint (2015)
- Marlowe's Revenge, Dan Stuart (Fluff and Gravy Records, 2016)
