= Don't Blame Me (album) =

Studio album by Marc Ribot
- Released: November 21, 1995
- Recorded: 1994–1995
- Studio: New York City
- Genre: Avant-garde jazz
- Length: 47:30
- Label: DIW
- Producer: Marc Ribot

Marc Ribot chronology
The Book of Heads (1995)	Don't Blame Me (1995)	Shoe String Symphonettes (1997)

Don't Blame Me is a 1995 solo guitar album Marc Ribot and released on the Japanese DIW label.

== Recording ==
The album was recorded in New York City and features several interpretations of jazz standards, showtunes, and modern jazz compositions as well as three improvisations by Ribot. Ribot stated "That’s my favorite out of the batch. First, I like doing cover tunes. But those are standards with a secret agenda: they were all covered before me by Thelonius Monk or Albert Ayler. “Old Man River” was covered by Albert Ayler, “Don’t Blame Me” and Ellington's “In My Solitude” were recorded by Thelonius Monk on his solo records. What every musician does, whether they know it or not, is arrange their own history. So I'm a rock musician, but in my history of rock I would include, not all jazz musicians per se, but Monk and Ayler, and Ornette Coleman's Prime Time".

== Reception ==
Professional ratings
Review scores
Source	Rating
AllMusic	3/5 stars

The AllMusic review by Brian Beatty stated: "Though probably a must-have for completists and ardent fans of New York City's downtown avant-garde, Don't Blame Me isn't the place for the uninitiated to begin".

Writing in The Village Voice, Gary Giddins wrote: "Ribot suggested a new potential in his playing. Don't Blame Me delivers on it. Here is a disc that consists chiefly of standards, and actually mines them for something beyond their usual glibness of theme and variations. Ribot maintains a respect for their songfulness that shuns wanton irony. He plays them as though the lead sheets were painted over a long wall in oversize notes, each note to be tested and accepted or rejected before moving on to the next".

== Track listing ==
1. "I'm in the Mood for Love" (Dorothy Fields, Jimmy McHugh) – 2:50
2. "Noise 1" (Marc Ribot) – 2:22
3. "Don't Blame Me" (Fields, McHugh) – 5:51
4. "Ghosts" (Albert Ayler) – 4:54
5. "Spigot" (Ribot) – 4:10
6. "Body and Soul" (Johnny Green, Edward Heyman, Robert Sour, Frank Eyton) – 3:04
7. "Bouncin' Around" (Gus Deloof) – 3:18
8. "Solitude" (Eddie DeLange, Duke Ellington, Irving Mills) – 4:35
9. "Dinah" (Harry Akst, Sam M. Lewis, Joe Young) – 3:09
10. "Song for Ché" (Charlie Haden) – 4:44
11. "These Foolish Things" (Harry Link, Holt Marvell, Jack Strachey) – 2:20
12. "Noise 2" (Ribot) – 2:06
13. "Ol' Man River" (Oscar Hammerstein II, Jerome Kern) – 4:11

== Personnel ==
- Marc Ribot – guitars
