= Marc Ribot =

American guitarist and composer (born 1954)

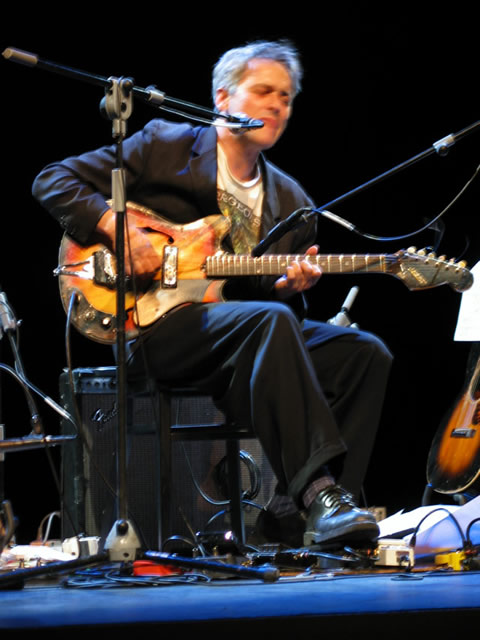
- Ribot performing in 2007

Background information
- Born: May 21, 1954 (age 72); Newark, New Jersey, United States
- Genres: Experimental, alternative, avant garde, electronic, hardcore punk, no wave, classical, free jazz
- Occupation: Musician
- Instrument: Guitar
- Years active: 1970s–present
- Labels: Antilles, Avant, DIW, Atlantic, Tzadik, Pi, Anti-, Northern Spy
- Website: www.marcribot.com

Marc Ribot (/ˈriːboʊ/; born May 21, 1954) is an American guitarist and composer.

His work has touched on many styles, including no wave, free jazz, rock, and Cuban music. Ribot is also known for collaborating with other musicians, most notably Tom Waits, Elvis Costello, Vinicio Capossela and John Zorn.

== Biography ==
Marc Ribot, who is of Jewish heritage, was born in Newark, New Jersey. He grew up in the Montrose section of South Orange, New Jersey.

He has worked extensively as a session guitarist. He has performed and recorded with Tom Waits, Caetano Veloso, John Zorn, David Sylvian, Jack McDuff, Wilson Pickett, Arto Lindsay, T Bone Burnett, Medeski, Martin and Wood, Cibo Matto, Sam Phillips, Elvis Costello, Tift Merritt, Allen Ginsberg, Foetus, Robert Plant and Alison Krauss, Susana Baca, The Black Keys, Vinicio Capossela, Alain Bashung, McCoy Tyner, Elton John, Trey Anastasio, Jon Fishman, John Medeski, Oteil Burbridge, Madeleine Peyroux, Marianne Faithfull, Diana Krall, Natalia Lafourcade, Mike Patton, Stormin’ Norman and Suzy Williams, Neko Case, Joe Henry, Allen Toussaint, Robert Quine, Ikue Mori, and others. Ribot was a member of The Lounge Lizards for several years in the late 1980s. Band leader John Lurie later wrote: "Marc is a musical genius. So many ideas are coming out of that guy that it is actually often a problem."

Ribot's earliest work as a session musician was featured on Tom Waits's Rain Dogs (1985) and helped define Waits's new musical direction. Ribot worked with Waits on many of his following albums including Franks Wild Years (1987), Big Time (1988), Mule Variations (1999), Real Gone (2004), Orphans: Brawlers, Bawlers & Bastards (2006) and Bad as Me (2011). He has appeared on Elvis Costello's Spike (1989), Mighty Like a Rose (1991), and Kojak Variety (1995). Ribot has appeared on numerous recordings by John Zorn, including many of Zorn's Filmworks recordings, solo performances on Zorn's Masada Guitars (also featuring Bill Frisell and Tim Sparks), and is a member of Zorn's Bar Kokhba Sextet and Electric Masada.

Ribot's first two albums featured the Rootless Cosmopolitans, followed by an album of works by Frantz Casseus for solo guitar. Further releases found him working in a variety of band and solo contexts including two albums with his self-described "dance band", Marc Ribot y Los Cubanos Postizos (Prosthetic Cubans), featuring compositions by Arsenio Rodríguez.

Ribot admitted to Guitar Player a relatively limited technical facility due to learning to play right-handed despite being left-handed: "That's a real limit, one that caused me a lot of grief when I was working with Jack McDuff and realising I wasn't following in George Benson's footsteps. I couldn't be a straight-ahead jazz contender if you held a gun to my head."

He currently performs and records with his groups Marc Ribot's Ceramic Dog with bassist Shahzad Ismaily and drummer Ches Smith of the avant-garde band Secret Chiefs 3, Marc Ribot Trio with bassist Henry Grimes and drummer Chad Taylor of Chicago Underground, Marc Ribot y Los Cubanos Postizos with Horacio “El Negro” Hernandez on drums and original members pianist Anthony Coleman, bassist Brad Jones and percussionist EJ Rodriquez, and The Young Philadelphians, covering 1970s Philadelphia soul music with Philadelphia-based musicians bassist Jamaaladeen Tacuma and drummer G. Calvin Weston with guitarist Mary Halvorson plus a three-piece string section.

A biographical documentary film about Ribot was made, called The Lost String.

Ribot was also a judge for the sixth annual Independent Music Awards.

== Discography ==
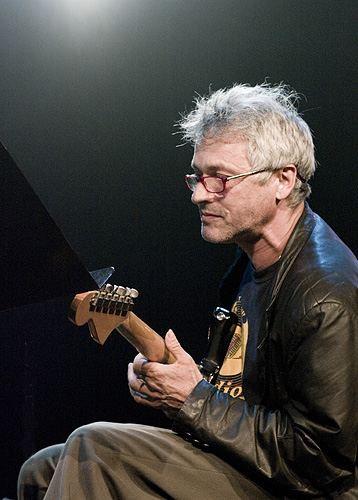
Marc Ribot in Saalfelden, Austria 2010

- Rootless Cosmopolitans (Antilles, 1990)
- Requiem for What's His Name (Les Disques du Crépuscule, 1992)
- Marc Ribot Plays Solo Guitar Works of Frantz Casseus (Les Disques du Crépuscule, 1993)
- Shrek (Avant, 1994)
- Subsonic 1: Sounds of a Distant Episode with Shrek (Sub Rosa/Subsonic 1994, split album with Fred Frith)
- The Book of Heads (Tzadik, 1995) composed by John Zorn
- Don't Blame Me (DIW, 1995)
- Surrender to the Air (1996)
- Shoe String Symphonettes (Tzadik, 1997)
- The Prosthetic Cubans (Atlantic, 1998) with Los Cubanos Postizos
- Yo! I Killed Your God (Tzadik, 1999)
- ¡Muy Divertido! (Atlantic, 2000) with Los Cubanos Postizos
- Saints (Atlantic, 2001)
- Inasmuch as Life is Borrowed (Ultima Vez, 2001) limited edition
- Scelsi Morning (Tzadik, 2003)
- Soundtracks Volume 2 (Tzadik, 2003)
- Spiritual Unity (Pi, 2005)
- Exercises in Futility (Tzadik, 2008)
- Party Intellectuals (Pi, 2008) with Ceramic Dog
- Silent Movies (Pi, 2010)
- Your Turn (Northern Spy, 2013) with Ceramic Dog
- Live at the Village Vanguard (Pi, 2014) with Henry Grimes and Chad Taylor
- The Young Philadelphians: Live in Tokyo (Yellowbird, 2016) with the Young Philadelphians
- YRU Still Here? (Northern Spy, 2018) with Ceramic Dog
- Songs of Resistance: 1942–2018 (Anti-, 2018)
- What I Did On My Long Vacation (Northern Spy (exclusively on Bandcamp), 2020) with Ceramic Dog
- Hope (Northern Spy / Yellowbird / P-Vine, 2021) with Ceramic Dog
- Connection (Knockwurst, 2023) with Ceramic Dog
- Map Of A Blue City (New West Records 2025)

== Filmography ==
- The Tune (1992)
- Sabbath in Paradise (1998)
- The Soul of a Man (directed by Wim Wenders) (2003)
- A Bookshelf on Top of the Sky: 12 Stories About John Zorn (2004)
- The Lost String (directed by Anais Prosaic) (2007)
- Gare du Nord (2013)
- In the Land of Arto (2025)
