= Gene Watson discography =

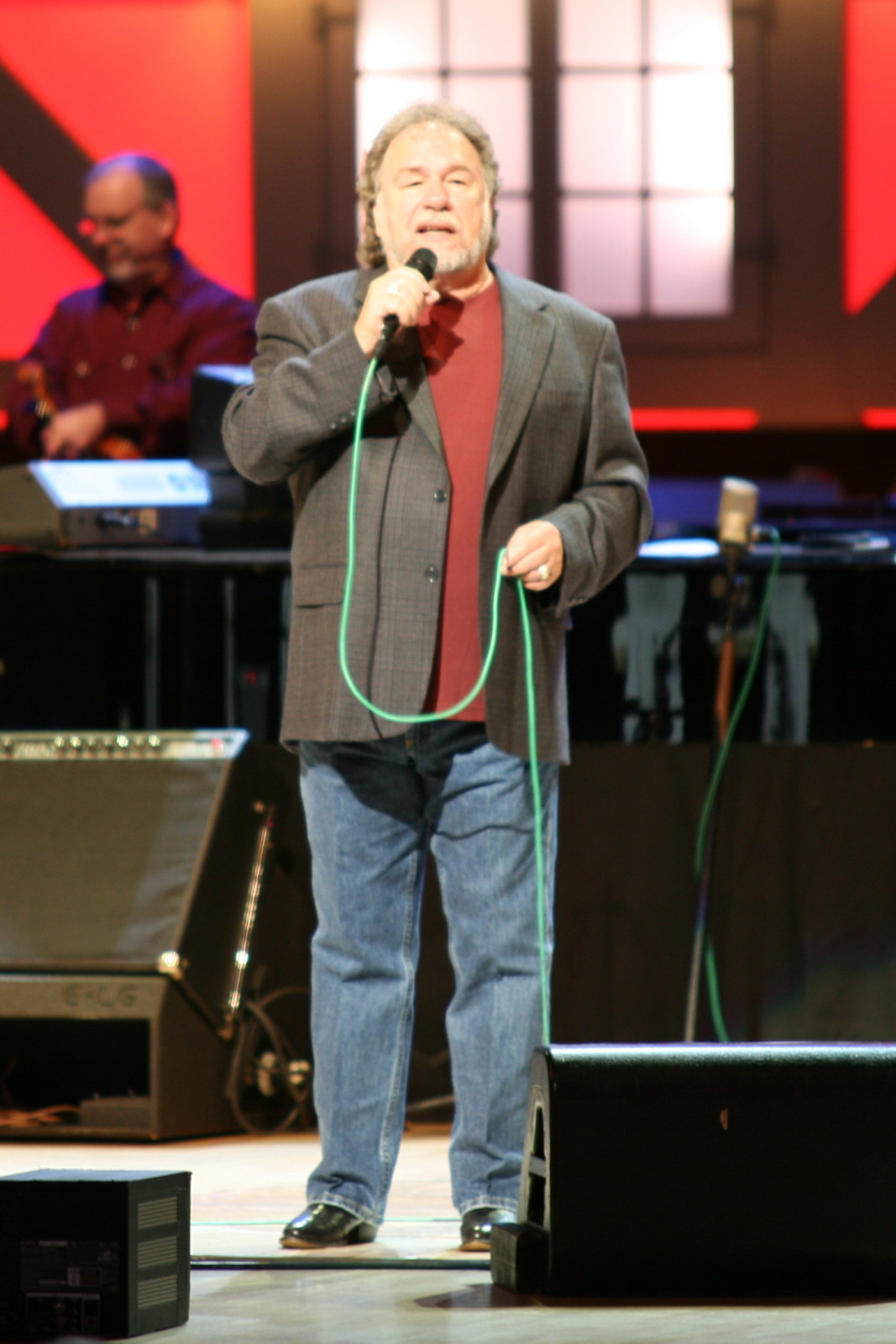
- Watson performing at the Grand Ole Opry in 2007
- Studio albums: 33
- Compilation albums: 8
- Singles: 61
- Music videos: 5

Gene Watson is an American country music artist. His discography consists of 33 studio albums, eight compilation albums, 61 singles, and five music videos. Of his singles, 48 charted on the U.S. Billboard Hot Country Songs charts between 1975 and 1997, including the 1982 number one single "Fourteen Carat Mind".

== Albums ==
=== Studio albums ===
==== 1960s–1980s ====
Title	Album details	Peak positions	
Title	Album details	US Country	CAN Country
Gene Watson	Release year: 1969; Label: Wide World	—	—
Love in the Hot Afternoon	Release year: 1975; Label: Capitol	5	—
Because You Believed in Me	Release year: 1976; Label: Capitol	24	—
Paper Rosie	Release year: 1977; Label: Capitol	22	—
Gene Watson's Beautiful Country	Release year: 1977; Label: Capitol	32	—
Reflections	Release year: 1978; Label: Capitol	23	14
Should I Come Home	Release year: 1979; Label: Capitol	16	—
No One Will Ever Know	Release year: 1980; Label: Capitol	45	—
Between This Time & the Next Time	Release year: 1981; Label: MCA	38	—
Old Loves Never Die	Release year: 1981; Label: MCA	57	—
This Dream's on Me	Release year: 1982; Label: MCA	27	—
Sometimes I Get Lucky (with the Farewell Party Band)	Release year: 1983; Label: MCA	16	—
Little By Little (with the Farewell Party Band)	Release year: 1984; Label: MCA	34	—
Heartaches, Love & Stuff	Release year: 1984; Label: MCA / Curb	21	—
Memories to Burn	Release year: 1985; Label: Epic	35	—
Starting New Memories	Release year: 1986; Label: Epic	49	—
Honky Tonk Crazy	Release year: March 25, 1987; Label: Epic	54	—
Back in the Fire	Release year: 1989; Label: Warner Bros.	42	—
"—" denotes releases that did not chart

==== 1990s–2020s ====
Title	Album details	Peak positions
Title	Album details	US Country
At Last	Release year: 1991; Label: Warner Bros.	74
In Other Words	Release year: 1992; Label: Broadland	—
Uncharted Mind	Release year: 1993; Label: Step One	—
The Good Ole Days	Release year: 1996; Label: Step One	—
Jesus Is All I Need	Release year: 1997; Label: Step One	—
A Way to Survive	Release year: 1997; Label: Step One	—
From the Heart	Release year: 2001; Label: Row Music Group	—
Gene Watson Sings	Release year: 2003; Label: Compendia	—
Then & Now	Release year: 2005; Label: Koch Nashville	—
In a Perfect World	Release year: 2007; Label: Shanachie	—
A Taste of the Truth	Release year: 2009; Label: Shanachie	—
Your Money and My Good Looks (with Rhonda Vincent)	Release year: 2011; Label: Upper Management	56
Best of the Best: 25 Greatest Hits (new re-recordings for Watson's own label)	Release year: 2012; Label: Fourteen Carat	64
My Heroes Have Always Been Country	Release year: 2014; Label: Fourteen Carat	48
Real. Country. Music.	Release year: 2016; Label: Fourteen Carat	—
My Gospel Roots	Release year: 2017; Label: Fourteen Carat	—
Outside the Box	Release year: 2022; Label: Fourteen Carat	—
"—" denotes releases that did not chart

=== Compilation albums ===
Title	Album details	Peak positions	
Title	Album details	US Country	CAN Country
The Best of Gene Watson	Release year: 1978; Label: Capitol	29	12
The Best of Gene Watson, Volume 2	Release year: 1981; Label: Capitol	—	—
Greatest Hits	Release year: 1985; Label: MCA / Curb	—	—
Texas Saturday Night	Release year: 1985; Label: MCA / Curb	—	—
Greatest Hits	Release year: 1990; Label: Curb	—	—
Eighteen Greatest Hits	Release year: 1999; Label: TeeVee / Capitol	—	—
Ultimate Collection	Release year: 2001; Label: Hip-O	—	—
"—" denotes releases that did not chart

== Singles ==
=== 1970s–1980s ===
Year	Single	Peak positions		Album
Year	Single	US Country	CAN Country	Album
1975	"Bad Water"	87	—	Love in the Hot Afternoon
1975	"Love in the Hot Afternoon"	3	3	Love in the Hot Afternoon
1975	"Where Love Begins"	5	4	Love in the Hot Afternoon
1976	"You Could Know as Much About a Stranger"	10	42	Love in the Hot Afternoon
1976	"Because You Believed in Me"	20	—	Because You Believed in Me
1976	"Her Body Couldn't Keep You (Off My Mind)"	52	—	Because You Believed in Me
1977	"Paper Rosie"	3	1	Paper Rosie
1977	"The Old Man and His Horn"	11	9	Gene Watson's Beautiful Country
1977	"I Don't Need a Thing at All"	8	4	Gene Watson's Beautiful Country
1978	"Cowboys Don't Get Lucky All the Time"	11	14	Gene Watson's Beautiful Country
1978	"One Sided Conversation"	8	6	Reflections
1979	"Farewell Party"	5	9	Reflections
1979	"Pick the Wildwood Flower"	5	2	Reflections
1979	"Should I Come Home (Or Should I Go Crazy)"	3	6	Should I Come Home
1979	"Nothing Sure Looked Good on You"	4	3	Should I Come Home
1980	"Bedroom Ballad"	18	43	Should I Come Home
1980	"Raisin' Cane in Texas"	15	53	No One Will Ever Know
1980	"No One Will Ever Know"	13	22	No One Will Ever Know
1981	"Any Way You Want Me"	33	—	Any Which Way You Can
1981	"Between This Time and the Next Time"	17	8	Between This Time & the Next Time
1981	"Maybe I Should Have Been Listening"	23	12	Between This Time & the Next Time
1981	"Fourteen Carat Mind"	1	5	Old Loves Never Die
1982	"Speak Softly (You're Talking to My Heart)"	9	4	Old Loves Never Die
1982	"This Dream's on Me"	8	11	This Dream's on Me
1982	"What She Don't Know Won't Hurt Her"	5	3	This Dream's on Me
1983	"You're Out Doing What I'm Here Doing Without"	2	5	Sometimes I Get Lucky (with the Farewell Party Band)
1983	"Sometimes I Get Lucky and Forget"	9	6	Sometimes I Get Lucky (with the Farewell Party Band)
1983	"Drinkin' My Way Back Home"	10	8	Little By Little (with the Farewell Party Band)
1984	"Forever Again"	10	18	Little By Little (with the Farewell Party Band)
1984	"Little by Little"	33	21	Little By Little (with the Farewell Party Band)
1984	"Got No Reason Now for Goin' Home"	7	15	Heartaches, Love & Stuff
1985	"One Hell of a Heartache"	43	38	Heartaches, Love & Stuff
1985	"Cold Summer Day in Georgia"	24	22	Memories to Burn
1985	"Memories to Burn"	5	2	Memories to Burn
1986	"Carmen"	32	27	Memories to Burn
1986	"Bottle of Tears"	50	40	Starting New Memories
1986	"Everything I Used to Do"	29	27	Starting New Memories
1987	"Honky Tonk Crazy"	43	30	Honky Tonk Crazy
1987	"Everybody Needs a Hero"	28	46	Honky Tonk Crazy
1988	"Don't Waste It on the Blues"	5	6	Back in the Fire
1989	"Back in the Fire"	20	24	Back in the Fire
1989	"The Jukebox Played Along"	24	40	Back in the Fire
1989	"The Great Divide"	41	—	Back in the Fire
"—" denotes releases that did not chart

=== 1990s–2000s ===
Year	Single	Peak positions		Album
Year	Single	US Country	CAN Country	Album
1991	"At Last"	61	59	At Last
1991	"You Can't Take It with You When You Go"	67	56	At Last
1992	"One and One and One"	66	92	In Other Words
1993	"In Other Words"	—	—	In Other Words
1993	"Old Porch Swing"	—	—	In Other Words
1993	"Snake in the House"	—	—	Uncharted Mind
1994	"Glass Hearts"	—	—	Uncharted Mind
1994	"Your Uncharted Mind"	—	—	Uncharted Mind
1995	"He's Back in Texas Again"	—	—	Uncharted Mind
1996	"Change Her Mind"	44	90	The Good Ole Days
1997	"No Goodbyes"	73	—	The Good Ole Days
2001	"Next to Nothin'"	—	—	From the Heart
2002	"The Man an' Me and You"	—	—	From the Heart
2002	"No Trash in My Trailer"	—	—	From the Heart
2003	"New Woman"	—	—	Gene Watson Sings
2007	"I Buried Our Love"	—	—	In a Perfect World
2009	"We've Got a Pulse" (with Trace Adkins)	—	—	A Taste of the Truth
2009	"Staying Together" (with Rhonda Vincent)	—	—	A Taste of the Truth
"—" denotes releases that did not chart

== Music videos ==
Year	Video
1983	"You're Out Doing What I'm Here Doing Without"
1983	"Sometimes I Get Lucky and Forget"
1993	"Old Porch Swing"
1993	"Snake in the House"
1994	"Your Uncharted Mind"
2001	"Next to Nothin'"
2009	"Staying Together"
