= Little Princess (album) =

Studio album by Tim Sparks
- Released: June 2009
- Recorded: February 18, 2009 at EastSide Studios, New York City
- Genre: Klezmer, world, jazz
- Length: 49:12
- Label: Tzadik
- Producer: Tim Sparks

Tim Sparks chronology
Sidewalk Blues (2009)	Little Princess (2009)	Chasin' the Boogie (2014)

Little Princess (subtitled Tim Sparks Plays Naftule Brandwein) is the eighth album by guitarist Tim Sparks and his fourth on the Tzadik Records label. It is a tribute album to the music of Klezmer clarinetist Naftule Brandwein.

== History ==
Naftule Brandwein, a flamboyant clarinet player, helped bring klezmer to North America in the early 20th century. His 78 rpm records were long seen as a primary source of klezmer until 1997 when they were re-mastered and reissued. Having previously recorded a few Brandwein compositions on his earlier Tzadik Records releases, Sparks returned to the Brandwein repertoire for his fourth CD for Tzadik. He stated “I’m not trying to make a klezmer guitar record, but rather rethink Naftule Brandwein through my particular kind of prism. I found that by taking a klezmer tune by Naftule Brandwein and putting it in a flamenco key, the melody suddenly just slides off the fret board.”

Bassist Greg Cohen and percussionist Cyro Baptista, who had both joined Sparks for his 2000 release Tanz and 2002 release At the Rebbe's Table, again form the rhythm section on Little Princess.

== Reception ==
Professional ratings
Review scores
Source	Rating
Acoustic Guitar	(not rated)
All About Jazz	(not rated)
Allmusic	4.5/5 stars
East Bay Express	(not rated)
Jazz Police	(not rated)
Minor 7th	(not rated)

Little Princess received consistently favorable reviews. Allmusic music critic Thom Jurek stated "Virtually every one of these ten cuts is an example of how intuitive, sophisticated, and creative Sparks is, not only as a player and interpreter, but as an arranger so canny that the listener would think all of these songs were written in the current era... Brilliant work and the best Sparks record to date." Acoustic Guitar called it "Brilliant fingerstyle explorations of klezmer compositions backed by bass and percussion."

Mark Keresman of the Oakland-based weekly newspaper East Bay Express highly recommended the album, calling it "...vaguely familiar and yet like nothing else, exuding joy and euphoric creativity." and calls Sparks' approach "... brilliant technique... free of stuffy 'reverence' for the object of his homage — Princess is modern, wiry, and inspired" Andrea Canter of Jazz Police wrote "Little Princess can make you laugh and cry at the same time."

Music critic Kirk Albrecht singled out "A Bagel with Onions" as the highlighted track, writing "...where Sparks (playing solo here) begins with cascading fingerpicking, and lets the tune flow in and out, but never loses its sense of direction. If you like Klezmer, or think you might, "Little Princess" is a good listen. "

In his review for All About Jazz, Elliott Simon compares the Klezmer revival of Brandwein's music in the 1980s with Sparks' interpretations and summarizes: "Perhaps because Brandwein's own musical pastiche, which included Jewish, Rom and Turkish, is as varied as Sparks'; the two are kindred spirits who come together beautifully and elegantly."

Acoustic Guitar named Little Princess as essential in their article "20 Years of Essential Acoustic Albums".

== Track listing ==
All songs by Naftule Brandwein. Arrangements by Tim Sparks, Greg Cohen, and Cyro Baptista.

1. "The Rebbe's Hasid" (Dem Rebin's Chusid) – 5:04
2. "Der Yid in Jerusalem" – 6:21
3. "Oh Daddy, That's Good" (Oy Tate, S'is Gut) – 4:50
4. "Little Princess" (Kleine Princessin) – 3:18
5. "Nifty's Freylekh" – 4:45
6. "A Few Bowls Terkish" (Turkishe Yalle Vey Uve) – 5:21
7. "The Dearest in Bukovina" (Das Teureste in Bukowina) – 4:22
8. "Leben Zol Palestina" – 5:38
9. "Turkish Circle Dance" (Der Terkisher-Bulgar Tanz) – 4:37
10. "A Bagel with Onions" (A Hora Mit Tzibeles) – 4:54

== Personnel ==
- Tim Sparks – steel-string acoustic guitar
- Greg Cohen – bass
- Cyro Baptista – percussion

== Production notes ==
- Tim Sparks – producer
- John Zorn – executive producer
- Kazunori Sugiyama – associate producer
- Marc Urselli – engineer, mixing
- Scott Hull – mastering
- Hueng-Hueng Chin – design
- Chryll Sparks – photography
- Tatjana Mesar – photography
