= Outside the Box =

Outside the Box may refer to:

- Outside the box, a metaphor about thinking unconventionally
- Outside the Box (festival), an annual music and arts festival in Boston, Massachusetts, US
- Outside the Box (Hacktivist album), 2016
- Outside the Box (Skream album), 2010
- Outside the Box (Vicki Genfan album), 2000
- Outside the Box, an album by Gene Watson, 2022
- Outside the Box Comedy Club, a comedy club in Kingston upon Thames, London

== See also ==
- Out of the box (disambiguation)
