= OOTB =

OOTB may refer to:

- Out of the Blue (Oxford University), an a cappella group
- Out of the Blue (Yale University), an a cappella group
- Out of the Blue (Electric Light Orchestra album), 1977
- Out of the box (feature), a functionality of a product that works immediately after installation
- Thinking out of the box

== See also ==
- Out of the Box (disambiguation)
