= Everybody Needs a Hero =

Single by Gene Watson

from the album Honky Tonk Crazy
- B-side: "When She Touches Me"
- Released: August 15, 1987
- Genre: Country
- Length: 3:05
- Label: Epic
- Songwriters: Troy Seals, Max D. Barnes
- Producer: Gene Watson

Gene Watson singles chronology
| "Honky Tonk Crazy" (1987) | "Everybody Needs a Hero" (1987) | "Don't Waste It on the Blues" (1988) |

"Everybody Needs a Hero" is a song recorded by American country music artist Gene Watson. It was released in August 1987 as the second single from the album Honky Tonk Crazy. The song reached #28 on the Billboard Hot Country Singles & Tracks chart. The song was written by Troy Seals and Max D. Barnes.

The song was later covered by The Marcy Brothers for their self-titled 1991 Atlantic album.

== Chart performance ==
| Chart (1987) | Peak poaition |
|---|---|
| US Hot Country Songs (Billboard) | 28 |
| Canadian RPM Country Tracks | 46 |
