= Neshama =

Neshama (Hebrew: נשמה) is a Hebrew word which can mean "soul" or "spirit". It may refer to:

- Soul § Judaism the soul in Judaism
- Neshama Carlebach
- Neshamah (album), a CD by Tim Sparks.
