= Chasin' the Boogie =

Studio album by Tim Sparks
- Released: 2014
- Recorded: October 13, Osnabrück, Germany
- Genre: Folk
- Label: Tonewood
- Producer: Peter Finger

Tim Sparks chronology
Little Princess (2009)	Chasin' the Boogie (2014)

Chasin' the Boogie is the ninth album by American guitarist Tim Sparks, released in 2014.

== Reception ==
Chasin' the Boogie received consistently favorable reviews. Minneapolis Star Tribune music critic Jon Bream wrote "Known for ethnic music, Sparks here interprets pop hits (“Both Sides Now,” “Blue Bayou”) and traditional tunes (“Wayfaring Stranger,” “I’ll Fly Away”) with warmth, passion and a remarkable sense of harmony and rhythm. His originals showcase both his virtuosity and creativity."

Doug Spencer of the Australian radio program The Weekend Planet highly recommended the album, calling it "mostly closer to home" and calls Sparks' cover versions "... highly original new versions"

Music critic James Filkins wrote "Bluesy, ragtimey, with a good dose of traditional structure and reminiscent of influential guitar phrases and riffs - Sparks' playing will transport you back in time... "Chasin' the Boogie" is as ambitious as it is entertaining. If you are new to Tim Sparks this is the perfect place to start."

== Track listing ==
1. "Carolina Blue Guitar" (Tim Sparks) – 3:09
2. "Chasin' the Boogie" (Sparks) – 3:10
3. "I'll Fly Away" (Albert Brumley) – 5:24
4. "Blackbird" (John Lennon, Paul McCartney) – 3:07
5. "Reckless Persuasion" (Sparks) – 3:53
6. "Mr. Bojangles" (Jerry Jeff Walker) – 3:32
7. "What a Friend We Have in Jesus" (Joseph M. Scriven, Charles Crozat Converse) – 1:52
8. "The Mississippi Blues" (Willie Brown) – 3:01
9. "Blue La La" (Sparks) – 3:08
10. "Both Sides Now" (Joni Mitchell) – 3:13
11. "Wayfaring Stranger" (Traditional) – 2:49
12. "Blue Bayou" ( Roy Orbison, Joe Melson) – 4:57

== Personnel ==
- Tim Sparks – steel-string acoustic guitar

== Production notes ==
- Peter Finger – producer
- Manfred Pollert – photography
