= Tanz =

Studio album by Tim Sparks
- Released: September 26, 2000
- Recorded: June 4, 2000 at Orange Music, New Jersey
- Genre: Klezmer, world, jazz
- Label: Tzadik
- Producer: Tim Sparks; John Zorn (executive producer)

Tim Sparks chronology
Neshamah (1999)	Tanz (2000)	At the Rebbe's Table (2002)

Tanz is the second recording by American guitarist Tim Sparks on the Tzadik Records label, released in 2000. The word טאַנץ (tanz) is Yiddish for dance, cognate to the German word Tanz with the same meaning.

== History ==
After the recording of traditional Jewish music arranged for solo guitar on Neshamah, producer John Zorn combined Sparks with Masada alumnus Greg Cohen and Brazilian percussionist Cyro Baptista. Music critic Ben Kettlewell called the combination of Sparks, Cohen and Baptisto "a wonderful adventure into the myriad of styles of music of the Jewish Diaspora." Cohen and Baptista would reunite with Sparks for two more releases on the Tzadik label.

Tanz includes four arrangements of songs by Klezmer clarinetist Naftule Brandwein. Sparks would later record Little Princess, an entire album of Brandwein arrangements.

== Reception ==
Professional ratings
Review scores
Source	Rating
Allmusic	4/5 stars
JazzTimes	(no rating)
Down Beat	(no rating)
Dirty Linen	(no rating)
Acoustic Guitar	(no rating)

Writing for Allmusic, critic Sean Westergaard wrote, "Sparks comes from a classical guitar background more than a fingerpicking folky background, and his virtuosic technique is incredible, but always in service to the music, not merely technique... Anyone with a passing interest in either Jewish music or fingerpicked guitar should seek out this recording; it's beautiful." Critic Gary Joyner of Acoustic Guitar commented on the music's influences from Brazil, Mexico, Yemen, the Balkans, Africa, and Spain and Sparks' "mastery of these difficult musical forms."

Commenting on the blend of styles used by Sparks, JazzTimes critic Jim Ferguson wrote, "... this beautiful recording isn't jazz per se, but it does have a spontaneity, depth and improvisational aspect that will appeal to anyone willing to step outside their everyday listening experience." Down Beat critic John Hadley echoed the blending of styles, writing "With impeccable control, he imparts quiet depth to his close study of the melodies, harmonies and unusual rhythms... No small achievement, Sparks conveys the pathos of the Diaspora in his music." as did Dirty Linen critic Paul Emile Comeau: "Not only is the idea of playing such music on acoustic guitar a novel idea but, in the nimble hands of Sparks, it succeeds admirably... The mix of a traditional approach with the jazz nuances that the trio brings to the arrangements makes for compelling and original music which should impress both guitar aficionados and those with a keen interest in the diversity of Jewish music."

== Track listing ==
1. "Wie Bist Die Gewesen Vor Prohibition?" (What Were You Doing During Prohibition?) (Naftule Brandwein) – 3:53
2. "Min Khatrat" (Do Not Walk at Night) (Sham'a Avakam, Jewish-Yeminite trad.) – 4:16
3. "Bolgarskii Zhok" (Bulgar Dance) (Rumanian trad.) – 3:25
4. "Araber Tanz" (Naftule Brandwein) – 3:56
5. "Dos Oybershte Fun Shtoysl" (The Most Conceited of All) (Yiddish trad.) – 4:53
6. "Der Terk In America" (Naftule Brandwein) – 4:51
7. "Fufzehn Yahr Fon Der Heim Awek" (Fifteen Years Away From Home) (Naftule Brandwein) – 3:26
8. "Hila Wasa" (Karamanji Azdro, Judeo-Kurdish trad.) – 2:53
9. "Aji Tu Yorma?" (Where Are You My Lover?) (Dagestan, Judeo-Azeri trad.) – 4:27
10. "Tanst, Tanst Yidelekh" (Dance Little Yid) (Yiddish trad.) – 3:02
11. "Gut Morgn" (Good Morning) (Yiddish trad.) – 2:22
12. "Ayumati Te'Orer Ha-Yesheinim" (The Holy Presence Awakens the Sleepers) (Jewish-Yeminite Manakha trad.) – 2:47
13. "La Rosa Enflorece" (The Rose in Bloom) (Anonymous, Balkan Sephardic trad) – 4:29

== Personnel ==
- Tim Sparks – guitar
- Greg Cohen – bass
- Cyro Baptista – percussion

== Production notes ==
- Produced by Tim Sparks
- Executive producer: John Zorn
- Associate producer: Kazunori Sugiyama
- Recorded by David Baker at Orange Music, NJ
- Mastered by Alan Tucker
- Design by Hueng-Hueng Chin
