= Guitars in the Classroom =

- Company type: 501(c)3
- Industry: Music Education
- Founded: 1998
- Headquarters: San Diego, California
- Key people: Jessica Anne Baron, Executive Director
- Services: Music Education, Musical instrument provision
- Website: www.guitarsintheclassroom.org

Guitars in the Classroom (GITC)(`get-see`) is a non-profit organization that trains and equips classroom teachers to integrate singing and playing guitar into the daily school experience. Founded in 1998, GITC produces programs over 30 states and several foreign countries. To date, the organization has helped teach more than 100,000 students. The company is headquartered in San Diego, California.

GITC is supported in part by NAMM, The International Music Products Association, National Endowment for the Arts, Johnson Ohana Charitable Foundation (founded by musician Jack Johnson), The D'Addario Music Foundation, The Bill Graham Memorial Foundation, The Wishlist Foundation, as well as individual donors.

== History ==
Jessica Anne Baron started the GITC program largely in response to requests for musical training from classroom teachers in the schools where she served as a music specialist. She still directs the organization, which has expanded from its original base in the Santa Cruz area to spawning programs all across North America. Under the guidance of four regional directors, over 50 program coordinators and instructors (usually music specialists or local guitar instructors) train thousands of classroom teachers each year.

== Mission ==
GITC's mission is to train classroom teachers and specialists to transform their pre-k through junior high classrooms with creatively engaging, musically-infused lessons that inspire full student participation and promote successful learning. GITC programs seek to help educators with no prior musical experience to discover and develop their own musicality while learning to integrate music making across the academic curriculum through "song-based instruction." The goal is to provide students of all ages with every learning style with positive, participatory, educational, musical access at school every day.

== Programs ==
GITC offers essential musical training that includes singing, basic acoustic guitar and song leading for adults who are either non-musicians or want to become better musicians in service to children and learning. GITC tailors the basic framework to the pace and curriculum to fit the participants in each group. Available programs include: "Strum & Sing" covering fundamental development, "Amigo Program" for English Learners, "Early Childhood Education" for those working with young children, and the "MIRSE" (pronounced `mercy`) for those working with Special Needs Individuals. GITC has also begun the integration of Ukulele training into many programs. Growth is organic, and programs in new locations often begin with an individual seeking to either teach or be taught.

== Artist Outreach ==
GITC's Artists' Registry program has attracted notable artists, who have donated their time to teach in the classroom. Some of the Artists involved include:

- Muriel Anderson
- Suzy Bogguss
- Vicki Genfan
- Tony Velociraptor
- Jack Johnson
- Laurence Juber
- The Quarrymen
- Chris Velan
- Moi Navarro
- Nik West
- George Winston
