= Sidewalk Blues =

Studio album by Tim Sparks
- Released: 2009
- Genre: Jazz, folk, blues
- Length: 52:50
- Label: Tonewood Records
- Producer: Tim Sparks

Tim Sparks chronology
At the Rebbe's Table (2002)	Sidewalk Blues (2009)	Little Princess (2009)

Sidewalk Blues (subtitled Blues, Rags, Jazz & Spirituals) is an album by American guitarist Tim Sparks, released in 2009. It marks a return to 'roots' music for Sparks after three albums of klezmer and jazz recordings on the Tzadik Records label.

== History ==
After three releases on the Tzadik Records label, Sparks decided to return to his musical roots of North Carolina. In a quote from a story in High Plains Reader, Sparks said “After Masada Guitars I wanted to revisit roots music. This record is something I’ve always wanted to make, but I needed the hindsight of thirty years to work on guitar to complete it... I reached a point where I realized I had a record here and that I had good arrangements of these songs.”

Sparks used a variety of guitars for the recording, including Collings, a custom-made Hoffman, Lakewood, 1954 Martin 00-17, and a 1917 Gibson L-3.

== Reception ==
Professional ratings
Review scores
Source	Rating
Guitar Player	(no rating)
Minor 7th	(not rated)

Guitar Player noted the wonderful sound of the various guitars used and the "great arrangements and virtuoso performances" wrote "If you think you might go for swinging fingerstyle arrangements of blues tunes... you should take this disc for a spin." Music critic Chip O'Brien praised the variety of the album, writing Sparks "plows, punctuates, and pulses his way through a well-chosen batch of ragtime, jazz, country blues, and gospel with an individual flair and spirit to burn... a master of the instrument. His arrangements and performances of Louis Armstrong, Fats Waller, Jelly Roll Morton, and Bix Beiderbecke compositions are flawless, at times playful, and always soulful... A must have for fans of Tim Sparks and for anyone who loves fingerstyle guitar playing."

== Track listing ==
1. "Mississippi Blues" (Willie Brown) – 3:08
2. "Sidewalk Blues" (Jelly Roll Morton) – 2:44
3. "Oriental Blues" (Eubie Blake) – 3:58
4. "Potato Head Blues" (Louis Armstrong) – 2:43
5. "In a Mist" (Bix Beiderbecke) – 3:06
6. "The Alligator Crawl" (Fats Waller) – 2:46
7. "How Great Thou Art" (Traditional) – 3:49
8. "There Ain't No Sweet Man That's Worth the Salt O' My Tears" (Fred Fisher) – 3:10
9. "The Pearls" (Morton) – 3:09
10. "Maple Leaf Rag" (Scott Joplin) – 2:28
11. "This Great Caravan Keeps On Rolling Along" (Vep Ellis) – 4:21
12. "Goin' Back to Mississippi Blues" (Brown, Arrangement by Tim Sparks) – 2:52
13. "Carolina Shout" (James P. Johnson) – 2:57
14. "I'll Fly Away" (Albert Brumley) – 2:57
15. "Victory Rag" (Maybelle Carter) – 2:16
16. "Jelly Roll Blues" (Morton) – 3:42
17. "Amazing Grace" (Traditional) – :33

== Personnel ==
- Tim Sparks – acoustic guitar

== Production notes ==
- Produced by Tim Sparks
- Recorded by Rod Volker, Steve Elliot, Bob Pierce, Bruce Muckala, Phil Kerr
- Design by Lacey Koby
- Photography by Gale Kass
