= Up Close (disambiguation) =

Up Close was an ESPN TV series 1981–2001.

Up Close may also refer to:

- Up Close (Eric Johnson album)
- Up Close (Gina Jeffreys album)
- Up Close (Jesse McCartney album)

== See also ==
- Up Close and Personal (disambiguation)
