= Morone (surname) =

Morone is a surname, and may refer to:

- Domenico Morone (c. 1442–1518), Italian painter
- Francesco Morone, Italian painter
- Franco Morone, Italian guitar player, teacher, composer and arranger
- Giovanni Morone, Italian cardinal
- James Morone, American political scientist and author
