= Back in the Fire =

Single by Gene Watson

from the album Back in the Fire
- B-side: "Just How Little I Know"
- Released: March 18, 1989
- Genre: Country
- Length: 3:07
- Label: Warner Bros.
- Songwriters: Mike Reid; Rory Bourke
- Producers: Gregg Brown, Ed Seay, Paul Worley

Gene Watson singles chronology
| "Don't Waste It on the Blues" (1988) | "Back in the Fire" (1989) | "The Jukebox Played Along" (1989) |

"Back in the Fire" is a song written by Mike Reid and Rory Bourke, and recorded by American country music artist Gene Watson. It was released in March 1989 as the second single and title track from the album Back in the Fire. The song reached #20 on the Billboard Hot Country Singles & Tracks chart.

== Chart performance ==
| Chart (1989) | Peak position |
|---|---|
| Canada Country Singles (RPM) | 24 |
| US Hot Country Songs (Billboard) | 20 |
