= Franco Morone =

Italian musician (born 1956)

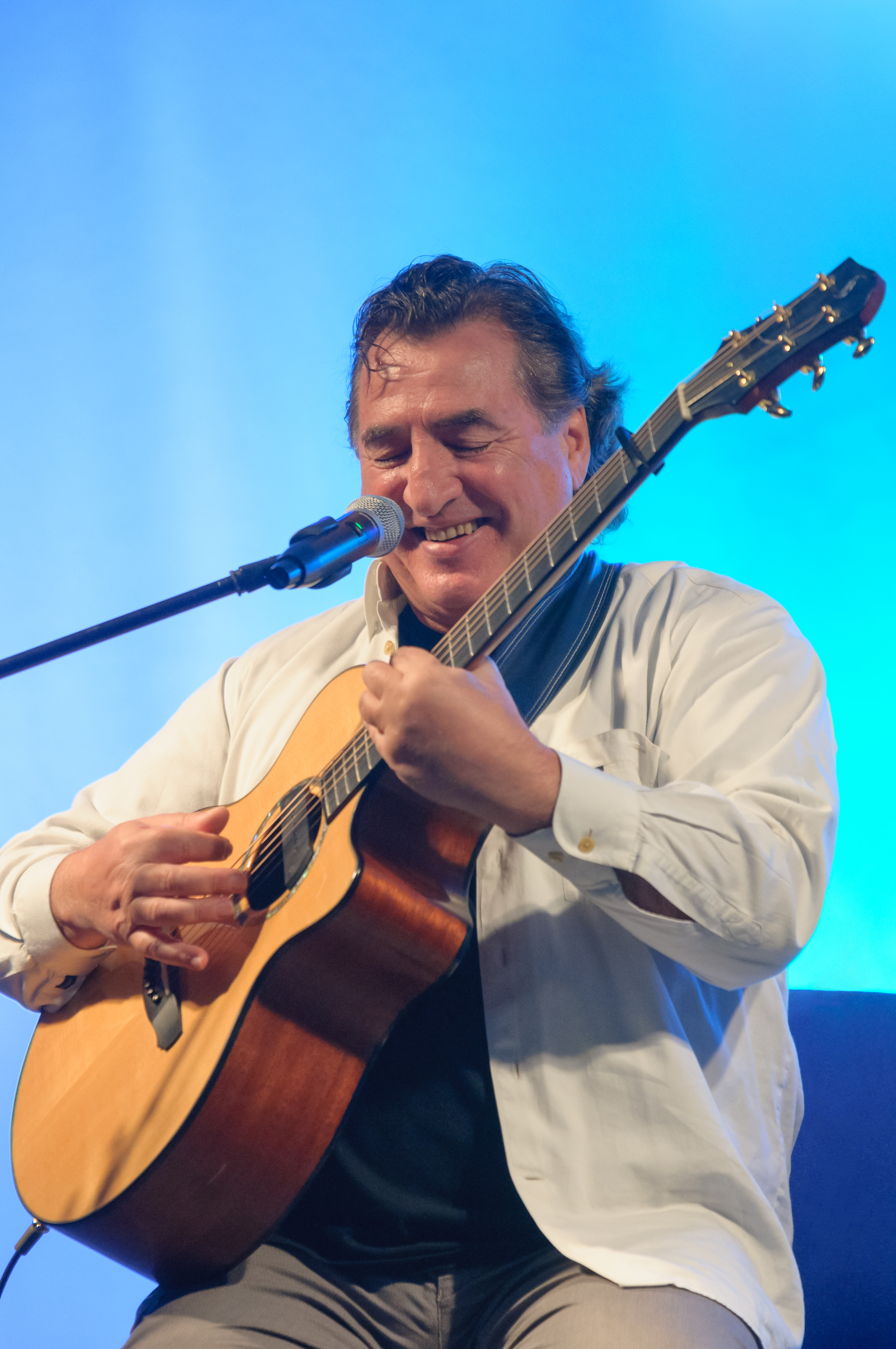
Morone performing in 2017

Francesco Morone (born June 6, 1956, Lanciano, Abruzzo, Italy) known as Franco Morone, is an Italian guitar player, teacher, composer and arranger specializing in the fingerstyle technique. He is the author of several books and has recorded CDs and videos playing his original music, which combines traditional Italian and Celtic melodies with jazz, blues and folk influences. He currently performs and teaches across Europe, the United States, and Japan.

== Biography ==
Francesco started playing guitar at age 12 and published his first guitar book, My Acoustic Blues Guitar, in 1986. He obtained a degree in Law from the University of Bologna in 1987 and has worked as a journalist with the magazines Guitar Club, Chitarre and Acoustic Guitar.

As a musician, Morone has performed with Woody Mann, John Renbourn, Alex de Grassi, Beppe Gambetta, Peter Finger, Tim Sparks, and Leo Kottke. He regularly performs solo and in a duo with singer Raffaella Luna and has recorded for Ariola MBG, Carisch, Bèrben and currently produces with his label Acoustic Guitar Workshops - Italy.

His collection Italian Fingerstyle Guitar has achieved recognition in the category of best album of the solo guitar by GPJ Folk Awards for American independent music.

He has appeared as a guest on several television broadcasts to discuss and perform his music.

His recent critically acclaimed solo album, Strings of Heart, received widespread international praise from acoustic guitar publications and critics for its refined phrasing and melodic depth.

== Discography ==
- Stranalandia – DDD/BMG Italy (1990)
- Guitàrea - AMR Germany (1994)
- The South Wind – AMR Germany (1996)
- Melodies Of Memories - AMR Germany (1998)
- Running Home - AMR Germany (2001)
- Italian Fingerstyle Guitar - Traditional and Popular Songs - AMR Germany (2003)
- The Road To Lisdoonvarna - AMR Germany (2005)
- Songs We Love – with Raffaella Luna (vocals) – AGW Italy (2008)
- Miles Of Blues – AGW Italy (2010)
- Back to My Best – AGW Italy (2012)
- Canti Lontani Nel Tempo – Italian Traditional Songs – with Raffaella Luna (vocals) - AGW Italy (2013)
- Strings of Heart - AGW Italy (2021)

== Bibliography ==
- My Acoustic Blues Guitar – Bèrben Italy (1986) - AMBooks Germany (1992)
- The South Wind – Bèrben Italy (1991) / AMBooks Germany (1995)
- Stranalandia – AMBooks Germany (1990) / AGW Italy (2026, rev. and updated ed.)
- Guitàrea – Bèrben Italy (1994) / AMBooks Germany (1994) / AGW Italy (2026, rev. and updated ed.)
- Melodies Of Memories – AMBooks Germany (1998) / AGW Italy (2026, rev. and updated ed.)
- Master Anthology of Blues Guitar Solos, (Fat Boy Blues) Volume One – Mel Bay USA (2000)
- Master Anthology of Fingerstyle Guitar Solos, (Crazy Basses) Volume 1 - Mel Bay USA (2000)
- Fingerstyle Jazz Collection – AGW Italy (2008)
- Celtic Fingerstyle Collection – AGW Italy (2009)
- Italian Fingerstyle Guitar - AMBooks Germany (2004) / AGW Italy (2026, rev. and updated ed.)
- Basic Fingerstyle Collection – AMBooks Germany (2007) / Carisch Italy (2007)
- 10 Duets for Fingerstyle Guitar - with Ulli Boegershausen (guitar) - AMBooks Germany (2009)
- Blues & Jazz for Fingerstyle Guitar - Mel Bay USA (2011)
- Back To My Best – AGW Italy (2012)
- Easy Songs for Fingerstyle Guitar - AGW Italy (2016)
- Christmas Songs for Fingerstyle Guitar - AGW Italy (2021)
- Strings of Heart - AGW Italy (2022)
- Jazz Standards for Fingerstyle Guitar - AGW Italy (2024)
- II° Celtic Fingerstyle Collection - AGW Italy (2025)
- Easy Blues & Folk Songs for Fingerstyle Guitar - AGW Italy (2026)

== Videos ==
- Fingerstyle Blues – Playgame Italy (1993)
- In Concert with Tim Sparks - AMR Germany (2005)
- Acoustic Guitar Solos - Mel Bay USA (2008)
- Acoustic Guitar Masters, Vol. 1 - AMR Germany (2009)

== Editorial Publications ==
- Guitaròma – Lizard Italy (1985)
- Guitar Highlights – AMR Germany (1994)
- Collana Strumento – BMG Italy (1996)
- Guitar Ballads – AMR Germany (1998)
