= What She Don't Know Won't Hurt Her =

Single by Gene Watson

from the album This Dream's on Me
- B-side: "Fightin' Fire with Fire"
- Released: November 6, 1982
- Genre: Country
- Length: 3:43
- Label: MCA
- Songwriter(s): David Lindsey, Ernie Rowell
- Producer(s): Russ Reeder, Gene Watson

Gene Watson singles chronology
"This Dream's on Me" (1982)	"What She Don't Know Won't Hurt Her" (1982)	"You're Out Doing What I'm Here Doing Without" (1983)

"What She Don't Know Won't Hurt Her" is a song written by David Lindsey and Ernie Rowell, and recorded by American country music artist Gene Watson. It was released in November 1982 as the second single from the album This Dream's on Me. The song reached number five on the Billboard Hot Country Singles and Tracks chart.

== Chart performance ==
Chart (1982–1983)	Peak position
US Hot Country Songs (Billboard)	5
Canadian RPM Country Tracks	3
