= Up Close & Personal (Vicki Genfan album) =

Studio album by Vicki Genfan
- Released: 2006
- Label: Harmonic Touch Records
- Producer: Ian Melrose

Vicki Genfan chronology
Vicki Genfan Live	Up Close & Personal

Professional ratings
Review scores
Source	Rating
Acoustic Guitar Magazine	"stunning guitarist" link
CD Baby	"her best work yet" link
Minor 7th Webzine	"a great CD" link

Up Close & Personal is Vicki Genfan's third available release. The double CD features the first disk of original instrumentals, titled Up Close, and a second, vocal-based disk, called Personal. Each disc contains a QuickTime video, showing clips of recording sessions and snapshots of Genfan as well as of the other recording artists. The double-CD features both Genfan's guitar virtuosity as well as her singer-songwriter abilities. Most of the songs are recorded with accompanying musicians.

== Track listing ==
Disk 1, Up Close

1. Atomic Reshuffle
2. Let It Rain
3. In A Mood
4. Kali Dreams
5. Luna Ahumada
6. Joy
7. Si
8. New Grass
9. Longest Night
10. Catch Me
11. Jamanolo

Disk 2, Personal

1. Don't Give Up On Me
2. Norwegian Wood (This Bird Has Flown)
3. Love Thing
4. When You Are Winter
5. What's Going On
6. Ain't Got Love
7. Living In The Country
8. So What's It To Ya
9. Carry Me Home
10. Eleanor

== Composing credits ==
All songs by Vicki Genfan, except

- "Jamanolo" by Vicki Genfan & Manolo Badrena
- "Norwegian Wood" (i.e. Norwegian Wood) by John Lennon & Paul McCartney
- "Love Thing" lyrics by Meg Garvey
- "What's Going On" by Marvin Gaye
- "Ain't Got Love" by Chris Jones
- "Living In The Country" by David Rumpler and Vicki Genfan
- "What's It To Ya" by Vicki Genfan and Kim Loren
- "Eleanor" by Vicki Genfan and Everett Bradley

== Personnel ==
- Vicki Genfan – acoustic guitar, electric guitar, synth guitar, bass guitar, mandolin, vocals, keys
- Ian Melrose – acoustic guitar, electric guitar, synth guitar, Dobro, mandolin, low whistle, low whistle choir, shaker
- Steve Jordan
- Manolo Badrena – shakers, vocal chant, drums, percussion
- Gil Goldstein – acoustic piano, Wurlitzer
- Rob Paparozzi – harmonica
- Daniel A. Wiess – Hammond organ
- John Mettam – drums & percussion, glockenspiel
- Jon Albrink – bass guitar
- Bryant Wilder – bass guitar
- Jess Willoughby – bass guitar
- Barb Merjan – drums
- Janelle Burdell – percussion, udu drum
- Sonya Heller – vocals
- Everett Bradley – vocals, loop
- Jenn Hopper – vocals
- Penny Mealing – vocals, shaker
- Erika Luckett – vocals
- Kerstin Blodig – vocal Ker-pad, acoustic guitar
- Ian Melrose – producer
- Vicki genfan, Tay Hoyle – co-producers
- Tay Hoyle, Dae Bennet, Brian Dozoretz – recording engineers
- Tay Hoyle, Ian Melrose – mixing
