= Up Close and Personal Tour =

Up Close and Personal Tour may refer to:

- Up Close and Personal Tour (Guns N' Roses), a tour by Guns N' Roses
- Up Close & Personal Tour (Backstreet Boys), a tour by Backstreet Boys
- Number Ones, Up Close and Personal, a tour by Janet Jackson

== See also ==
- Up Close and Personal (disambiguation)
