= Neshamah (album) =

Studio album by Tim Sparks
- Released: August 17, 1999
- Recorded: 1999
- Genres: Klezmer, world, jazz
- Length: 49:26
- Label: Tzadik
- Producers: Tim Sparks; John Zorn (Executive producer)

Tim Sparks chronology
One String Leads to Another (1999)	Neshamah (1999)	Tanz (2000)

Neshamah (Songs from the Jewish Diaspora) is the first solo recording by American guitarist Tim Sparks on the Tzadik Records label. "Neshamah" means "soul" in Hebrew. The arrangements adapt Ashkenazic klezmer, Sephardic and Middle Eastern Jewish music for the solo guitar.

== History ==
Sparks had sent a copy of his earlier CD Guitar Bazaar to avant-garde composer, record producer, and multi-instrumentalist John Zorn who liked the Bartok "Rumanian Dances" arrangements on that CD. Sparks had previously played a lot of Jewish music with various Jewish musicians and became adept in the Klezmer style. Zorn suggested the solo guitar adaptations of traditional Jewish songs. Sparks blended the songs with his background in jazz, Latin American, Balkan and American roots music.

== Reception ==
Professional ratings
Review scores
Source	Rating
Allmusic	3/5 stars
Dirty Linen	(no rating)
RootsWorld	(no rating)

In his Allmusic review, music critic Steven Lowey praised Neshamah writing "Sometimes the guitar transforms a piece into something different than it was originally... [Sparks] squeezes every ounce of melodic sophistication from a song's essence, resulting in a delightful and authentic display that while impressive is never overdone." In his review for Dirty Linen magazine, Jim Lee wrote "A truly groundbreaking project and one that also makes for refreshing listening. I'd recommend both to any fan of good music, be it guitar or otherwise." Critic Aaron Howard also praised the album, "The result is brilliant on many levels. Musically, Sparks is one of the better guitarists in the country, a musician's musician even if he remains largely unknown to a large audience. Think of Bill Frisell, Leo Kottke or Adrian Legg and that's the level that Sparks plays on."

== Track listing ==
1. "The Baal Shem Tov's Melody" – 3:21
2. "Hamisha Asar" (Flory Jagoda) – 4:54
3. "Odessa Mama (Odesa Mame)" – 3:09
4. "Skrip, Klezmerl Skripe" – 3:48
5. "Los Caminos de Sirkeci" – 2:59
6. "Kad Jawajuni" – 4:42
7. "A Hora Mit Tzibeles" (Naftule Brandwein) – 3:34
8. "Viva Orduena" – 2:57
9. "Quando el Rey Nimrod" – 3:49
10. "A Leybedike Honga" – 2:13
11. "The Shoemaker's Melody" – 2:50
12. "Freylich" – 3:53
13. "Sholem Aleichem" – 2:08
14. "Naftule Spielt Far Dem Rebin" (Naftule Brandwein) – 2:40
15. "Addio Querida" – 2:49

== Personnel ==
- Tim Sparks – guitar

== Production notes ==
- Produced by Tim Sparks
- Executive producer: John Zorn
- Associate producer: Kazunori Sugiyama
- Recorded by Rod Volker
- Mastered by Alan Tucker
- Design by Hueng-Hueng Chin

== See also ==
- Klezmer
- Sholem Aleichem
- Baal Shem Tov
