= Vicki Genfan Live =

Vicky Genfan live

Live album by Vicki Genfan
- Released: 2003
- Recorded: September 21, 2002 in Osnabrück, Germany
- Length: 41:39
- Label: Acoustic Music Records
- Producer: Peter Finger

Vicki Genfan chronology
Outside the Box	Vicky Genfan live	Up Close & Personal

Vicky Genfan live is Vicki Genfan's second available release. The album was recorded during the Open Strings Festival on September 21, 2002, in Osnabrück, Germany. Genfan was until then nearly unknown in Germany; the recorded concert introduced her to a fascinated audience.

== Track listing ==
All songs by Vicki Genfan, except "What's Going On" by Marvin Gaye

1. "New Grass"
2. "Impossinova"
3. "What's Going On"
4. "Outside the Box"
5. "Why Don't Love Sit Still"
6. "Si"
7. "Offerings"
8. "Don't Give Up On Me"
9. "Kali Dreams"
10. "Catch Me"
11. "Carry Me Home"

== Personnel ==
- Vicki Genfan - acoustic guitar
- Peter Finger - producer
- Michael Brammann - engineer
- Tay Hoyle, Manfred Pollert - photography
- Manfred Pollert - cover design
