= Don't Waste It on the Blues =

Single by Gene Watson

from the album Back in the Fire
- B-side: "I Picked a San Antonio Rose"
- Released: November 12, 1988
- Genre: Country
- Length: 3:07
- Label: Warner Bros.
- Songwriter(s): Jerry Vandiver, Sandy Ramos
- Producer(s): Gregg Brown, Ed Seay, Paul Worley

Gene Watson singles chronology
"Everybody Needs a Hero" (1987)	"Don't Waste It on the Blues" (1988)	"Back in the Fire" (1989)

"Don't Waste It on the Blues" is a song written by Jerry Vandiver and Sandy Ramos, and recorded by American country music artist Gene Watson. It was released in November 1988 as the first single from the album Back in the Fire. The song reached #5 on the Billboard Hot Country Singles & Tracks chart.

== Chart performance ==
Chart (1988–1989)	Peak position
US Hot Country Songs (Billboard)	5
Canada Country Tracks (RPM)	6

=== Year-end charts ===
Chart (1989)	Position
Canada Country Tracks (RPM)	73
US Country Songs (Billboard)	89
