= Nothing Sure Looked Good on You =

Single by Gene Watson

from the album Should I Come Home
- B-side: "The Beer at Dorsey's Bar"
- Released: December 1979
- Genre: Country
- Length: 3:42
- Label: Capitol
- Songwriter(s): Jim Rushing
- Producer(s): Russ Reeder

Gene Watson singles chronology
"Should I Come Home (Or Should I Go Crazy)" (1979)	"Nothing Sure Looked Good on You" (1979)	"Bedroom Ballad" (1980)

"Nothing Sure Looked Good on You" is a song written by Jim Rushing, and recorded by American country music artist Gene Watson. It was released in December 1979 as the second single from the album Should I Come Home. The song reached #4 on the Billboard Hot Country Singles & Tracks chart.

== Cover versions ==
- "Nothing Sure Looked Good on You" has also been recorded by American country music singer Alan Jackson. Jackson originally recorded the song for his 1999 album Under the Influence, which ended up not making the album. It eventually appeared on his 2009 compilation album Songs of Love and Heartache.

== Charts ==
=== Weekly charts ===
Chart (1979–1980)	Peak position
US Hot Country Songs (Billboard)	4
Canadian RPM Country Tracks	3

=== Year-end charts ===
Chart (1980)	Position
US Hot Country Songs (Billboard)	45
