= The Nutcracker Suite (Tim Sparks album) =

Studio album by Tim Sparks
- Released: 1993
- Recorded: 1992
- Genre: Classical, world
- Length: 36:43
- Label: Acoustic Music Records
- Producer: Tim Sparks

Tim Sparks chronology
The Nutcracker Suite (1993)	Guitar Bazaar (1995)

The Nutcracker Suite is a recording by American guitarist Tim Sparks, released in 1993. It consists of both an adaptation for acoustic guitar of Tchaikovsky's suite from his 1892 ballet The Nutcracker and the Balkan Dreams Suite, a suite of songs based on melodies and ideas of Béla Bartók. Sparks won the 1993 National Fingerstyle Guitar Championship playing his solo guitar arrangement of Tchaikovsky's "Nutcracker Suite".

== Reception ==
A review of the album in Classical Guitar Magazine stated: "After listening to the CD, I must admit that Sparks catches the essence of the music in a wonderful way. For the advanced player, this is an excellent edition to reap the rewards of the Nutcracker Suite."

Guitar Player called it "An exhilarating, odd-meter minefield inspired by Near Eastern music. An important recording from a gifted composer, arranger and performer."

== Track listing ==
(P.I. Tchaikovsky/arr. Tim Sparks)

1. "Overture" – 2:10
2. "March of the Toy Soldiers" – 2:12
3. "Dance of the Sugar Plum Fairy" – 1:57
4. "Cossack Dance" – 1:22
5. "Arabian Dance" – 2:41
6. "Chinese Dance" – 1:15
7. "Dance of the Reed Pipes" – 2:50
8. "Waltz of the Flowers" – 6:11

Balkan Dreams Suite (trad. arr. Tim Sparks)

1. "Oniro/Dimineatsa Dupa Nunta" – 3:09
2. "Samiotisa – 2:33
3. "Tatavliano Hasapiko" – 2:35
4. "Melek N'ty Ubana" – 4:06
5. "The Blues on Bartok Street" (Tim Sparks) – 3:25

== Personnel ==
- Tim Sparks - acoustic guitar, requinto

== Production notes ==
- Produced by Tim Sparks
- Engineered, mixed and mastered by Jay M. Fleming
