= You're Out Doing What I'm Here Doing Without =

Single by Gene Watson

from the album Sometimes I Get Lucky
- B-side: "You're Just Another Beer Drinkin' Song"
- Released: March 19, 1983
- Genre: Country
- Length: 2:32
- Label: MCA
- Songwriter(s): Allen Frizzell, Bo Roberts
- Producer(s): Russ Reeder, Gene Watson

Gene Watson singles chronology
| "What She Don't Know Won't Hurt Her" (1983) | "You're Out Doing What I'm Here Doing Without" (1983) | "Sometimes I Get Lucky and Forget" (1983) |

"You're Out Doing What I'm Here Doing Without" is a song written by Allen Frizzell and Bo Roberts, and recorded by American country music artist Gene Watson. It was released in March 1983 as the first single from the album Sometimes I Get Lucky. The song reached number two on the Billboard Hot Country Singles and Tracks chart.

== Charts ==
=== Weekly charts ===
| Chart (1983) | Peak position |
|---|---|
| US Hot Country Songs (Billboard) | 2 |
| Canadian RPM Country Tracks | 5 |

=== Year-end charts ===
| Chart (1983) | Position |
|---|---|
| US Hot Country Songs (Billboard) | 48 |
