= Voices in the Wilderness =

Studio album by John Zorn
- Released: March 25, 2003
- Recorded: August, 2002–January, 2003
- Genres: Jazz, klezmer
- Length: 124:33
- Label: Tzadik
- Producer: John Zorn

John Zorn chronology
Masada Guitars (2003)	Voices in the Wilderness (2003)	Chimeras (2003)

Masada Anniversary chronology
Masada Guitars (2003)	Voices in the Wilderness (2003)	The Unknown Masada (2003)

Masada Anniversary Edition Volume 2: Voices in the Wilderness is the second album in a series of five releases celebrating the 10th anniversary of John Zorn's Masada songbook project. It features 24 compositions by Zorn, each performed by different ensembles.

== Reception ==
Professional ratings
Review scores
Source	Rating
Allmusic	3.5/5 stars
The Penguin Guide to Jazz Recordings	3/4 stars

The Allmusic site awarded the album 3½ stars. The Klezmer Shack stated "for the wonderous ways in which these compositions are re-discovered and re-explored by a host of ensembles around the world, this collection becomes essential... This tribute only hints at the influence that Zorn and his Masada music have had internationally... This set is a wonderful starting point to get a sense of the music, or to enjoy its diversity and diverse interpretation.

== Track listing ==
All tracks are written by John Zorn.

Disc one
No.	Title	Music	Length
1.	"Karaim"	Pharaoh's Daughter	4:19
2.	"Kisofim"	Ben Perowsky Trio	6:45
3.	"Meholalot"	The Cracow Klezmer Band	4:57
4.	"Lakom"	Rova Saxophone Quartet	4:07
5.	"Tekufah"	Zony Mash	6:23
6.	"Paran"	Naftule's Dream	5:10
7.	"Khebar"	Mark Kramer	2:20
8.	"Nevalah"	Satlah	3:39
9.	"Abidan"	Jewlia Eisenberg	3:53
10.	"Tirzah"	Pachora	5:06
11.	"Peliyot"	Lemon Juice Quartet	5:49
12.	"Shebuah"	Steven Bernstein	8:27

Disc two
No.	Title	Music	Length
1.	"Ziphim"	Medeski Martin and Wood	7:16
2.	"Avodah"	Rashanim	5:32
3.	"Rokhev"	Davka	3:16
4.	"Tannaim"	Tin Hat Trio	3:29
5.	"Acharei Mot"	Peter Apfelbaum	7:32
6.	"Malkhut*"	Mephista	3:30
7.	"Kochot"	Mike Patton	3:47
8.	"Jair"	Ben Goldberg Trio	5:22
9.	"Ne'eman"	The Wollesens	6:54
10.	"Tahah"	Professionales	3:45
11.	"Tiferet"	Jenny Scheinman	5:02
12.	"Kedem"	Jamie and Vanessa Saft	7:29

- *misspelled as "Malkut" on album sleeve

== Personnel ==
=== Disc one ===
Karaim

- Basya Schecter – oud, vocals
- Shanir Ezra Blumenkranz – bass
- Daphna Mor – recorder, melodica
- Ben Oir – guitar
- Noah Heoffeld – cello
- Meg Okura – violin
- Daniel Freedman – percussion, vocal shouts

Kisofim

- Ben Perowsky – drums
- Uri Caine – piano
- Drew Gress – bass

Meholalot

- Jaroslaw Tyrala – violin
- Jaroslaw Bester – accordion
- Oleg Dyyak – accordion, clarinet, percussion
- Wojciech Front – bass

Lakom

- Bruce Ackley – soprano
- Larry Ochs – tenor
- Jon Raskin – baritone saxophone
- Steve Adams – sopranino

Tekufah

- Wayne Horvitz – Fender Rhodes
- Timothy Young – guitar
- Keith Lowe – bass
- Andy Roth – drums

Paran

- Glenn Dickson – clarinet
- Gary Bohan – trumpet
- Michael McLaughlin – piano
- Brandon Seabrook – guitar
- James Gray – tuba
- Eric Rosenthal – drums

Khebar

- Mark Kramer – all instruments, voice

Nevalah

- Daniel Zamir – soprano
- Kevin Zubek – drums

Abidan

- Jewlia Eisenberg – voice
- Wesley Anderson – percussion

Tirzah

- Chris Speed – clarinet
- Brad Shepik – tamboura, electric saz, guitar
- Skuli Sverrisson – bass, baritone guitar drones
- Jim Black – drums, percussion
- Jamie Saft – organ, keyboards, bass, guitar, programming

Peliyot

- Eyal Maoz – guitar
- Avishai Cohen – trumpet

Shebuah

- Steve Bernstein – cornet
- Doug Wieselman – E♭ clarinet
- Marty Ehrlich – bass clarinet
- Doug Wamble – vocals, guitar
- Aaron Johnson – shakers

=== Disc two ===
Ziphim

- John Medeski – keyboards
- Billy Martin – percussion
- Chris Wood – bass

Avodah

- Jon Madof – guitar
- Mathias Kunzli – drums, percussion
- Shanir Ezra Blumenkranz – bass

Rokhev

- Daniel Hoffman – violin
- Moses Sedler – cello
- Paul Hanson – bassoon
- Kevin Mummey – cajon

Tannaim

- Mark Orton – guitar, dobro, banjo, percussion
- Carla Kihlstedt – violin, viola
- Rob Burger – accordion, bass harmonica

Acharei Mot

- Peter Apfelbaum – organ, tenor, percussion
- Hiawatha Lockport – organ
- Charles Burnham – violin
- David Phelps – guitar
- Patrice Blanchard – bass
- Dafnis Prieto – drums

Malkhut*

- Ikue Mori – laptop electronics
- Sylvie Courvoisier – piano
- Susie Ibarra – drums

Kochot

- Mike Patton – all instruments, voice
- William Winant – percussion

Jair

- Ben Goldberg – clarinet
- Devin Hoff – bass
- Ches Smith – drums

Ne'eman

- Dave Binney – alto
- Steve Cardenas – guitar
- Tony Scherr – guitar
- Jesse Murphy – bass
- Brian Mitchell – organ
- Kenny Wollesen – drums

Tahah

- Anthony Coleman – piano
- Brad Jones – bass
- Roberto Rodriguez – drums

Tiferet

- Jenny Scheinman – violin
- Nels Cline – guitar
- Todd Sickafoose – bass
- Scott Amendola – drums

Kedem

- Jamie Saft – organ, keyboards, bass, guitar, programming
- Vanessa Saft – vocals

- *misspelled as "Malkut" on album sleeve
