= Should I Come Home (Or Should I Go Crazy) =

Single by Gene Watson

from the album Should I Come Home
- B-side: "Beautiful You"
- Released: September 15, 1979
- Genre: Country
- Length: 2:33
- Label: Capitol
- Songwriter(s): Joe Allen
- Producer(s): Russ Reeder

Gene Watson singles chronology
"Pick the Wildwood Flower" (1979)	"Should I Come Home (Or Should I Go Crazy)" (1979)	"Nothing Sure Looked Good on You" (1979)

"Should I Come Home (Or Should I Go Crazy)" is a song written by Joe Allen, and recorded by American country music artist Gene Watson. It was released in September 1979 as the first single from the album Should I Come Home. The song reached #3 on the Billboard Hot Country Singles & Tracks chart.

== Cover versions ==
- The song was covered by Joe Nichols on his 2005 album III.

== Chart performance ==
Chart (1979)	Peak position
US Hot Country Songs (Billboard)	3
Canadian RPM Country Tracks	6
