= This Dream's on Me =

Single by Gene Watson

from the album This Dream's on Me
- B-side: "This Torch That I Carry for You"
- Released: July 3, 1982
- Genre: Country
- Length: 3:12
- Label: MCA
- Songwriter(s): Fred Koller
- Producer(s): Russ Reeder, Gene Watson

Gene Watson singles chronology
"Speak Softly (You're Talking to My Heart)" (1982)	"This Dream's on Me" (1982)	"What She Don't Know Won't Hurt Her" (1982)

"This Dream's on Me" is a song written by Fred Koller, and recorded by American country music artist Gene Watson. It was released in July 1982 as the first single and title track from the album This Dream's on Me. The song reached number eight on the Billboard Hot Country Singles and Tracks chart.

== Chart performance ==
Chart (1982)	Peak position
US Hot Country Songs (Billboard)	8
Canadian RPM Country Tracks	11
