= Pick the Wildwood Flower =

Single by Gene Watson

from the album Reflections
- B-side: "Mama Sold Roses"
- Released: June 9, 1979
- Genre: Country
- Length: 2:23
- Label: Capitol
- Songwriter: Joe Allen
- Producer: Russ Reeder

Gene Watson singles chronology
"Farewell Party" (1979)	"Pick the Wildwood Flower" (1979)	"Should I Come Home (Or Should I Go Crazy)" (1979)

"Pick the Wildwood Flower" is a song written by Joe Allen, and recorded by American country music artist Gene Watson. It was released in June 1979 as the third single from the album Reflections. The song reached #5 on the Billboard Hot Country Singles & Tracks chart.

== Johnny Cash version ==
Johnny Cash recorded the song with Maybelle Carter. Their version was released as a single in 1973 on Columbia Records and reachwd No. 34 on Billboard's country chart.

== Charts ==
=== Weekly charts ===
Chart (1979)	Peak position
US Hot Country Songs (Billboard)	5
Canadian RPM Country Tracks	2

=== Year-end charts ===
Chart (1979)	Position
US Hot Country Songs (Billboard)	36
