= Chimeras (album) =

Studio album by John Zorn
- Released: April 22, 2003
- Recorded: January 3 & 4, 2003, SUNY Purchase, New York "Postlude" recorded July 8, 2009, Jordan Hall, Boston
- Genre: Avant-garde, contemporary classical music
- Length: 33:44
- Label: Tzadik TZ 7085
- Producer: John Zorn

John Zorn chronology
Voices in the Wilderness (2003)	Chimeras (2003)	The Unknown Masada (2003)

2010 Reissue

Chimeras (sub-titled A Child’s Adventures in the Realms of the Unreal) is an album of contemporary classical music by American composer John Zorn featuring a 12 part piece inspired by Arnold Schoenberg's atonal composition "Pierrot Lunaire". In 2010 the album was revised and re-recorded, with an additional "Postlude".

== Reception ==
Professional ratings
Review scores
Source	Rating
Allmusic	3.5/5 stars
Pitchfork Media	8.3 stars on a 10 point scale
Free Jazz Collective	3/5 stars

The Allmusic site awarded the album 3½ stars. Writing for Pitchfork Media, Alexander Lloyd Linhardt stated "the piece itself is thrillingly diverse, suddenly going from luminous to lugubrious and from classical to chaotic. It's a bold, unexpected new chapter in Zorn's corpus, or it would be if we didn't expect that from him". The Free Jazz Collective stated "it can be described as an absolute musical nightmare. It is dark, frightening, with light touches beaming through, like a lullaby arising out of violence, like a tiny light in the darkness giving you false hope of rescue, like friendly faces turning into gargoyles. Human warmth is present, but only as a delusion or deception... The music is as ambitious as it is pretentious, although it will not leave you indifferent".

== Track listing ==
All compositions by John Zorn

1. "One" – 0:55
2. "Two" – 2:42
3. "Three" – 2:54
4. "Four" – 2:05
5. "Five" – 1:45
6. "Six" – 2:08
7. "Seven" – 4:38
8. "Eight" – 3:19
9. "Nine" – 2:45
10. "Ten" – 2:53
11. "Interlude" – 1:24 Track 4 on 2010 reissue
12. "Eleven" – 3:18
13. "Twelve" – 2:50
14. "Postlude" – 0:16 Bonus track on 2010 reissue

== Personnel ==
- Ilana Davidson – voice (tracks 2–5, 7, 8, 10, 12 & 13)
- Elizabeth Farnum – voice (tracks 10 & 12)
- Jennifer Choi – violin (tracks 1, 4, 5, 6, 8, 9 & 12)
- Fred Sherry – cello (tracks 1, 4, 6, 8, 9, 12 & 13)
- Tara O'Connor – piccolo, flute, alto flute, bass flute (tracks 1, 3, 4, 6, 9, 10 & 12)
- Michael Lowenstern – bass clarinet, clarinet (tracks 1, 4, 6, 9 & 12)
- Stephen Drury – piano, organ, celesta (tracks 1–3, 6, 8, 9, 12 & 13)
- William Winant – percussion (tracks 1, 3, 5–7 & 9–13)
- Brad Lubman – conductor
