= Guitares au Palais =

Guitares au Palais Festival
- Genre: Folk, Gypsy music, flamenco, jazz, experimental guitar music
- Dates: Currently last weekend of August
- Locations: Palace of the Kings of Majorca, Perpignan, Pyrénées-Orientales, France
- Years active: 2004-present
- Organiser: General Council of the Pyrénées-Orientales

The Guitares au Palais is an annual guitar-oriented music festival in the Palace of the Kings of Majorca in Perpignan, Pyrénées-Orientales, France, which began in 2004. The festival focuses on folk, gypsy music, jazz, and flamenco. On the third day there is an additional program with a focus on indie rock related artists. The festival is for free.

The festival is held in the last weekend of August in the Palace and the gardens. The festival's art director is Pedro Soler and opens the stage to an eclectic stream of guitar enthusiasts with performances in traditional acoustic guitar, flamenco, classical music, gypsy music, pop music and jazz.

International guests includes the Rosenberg Trio, Tekamali and Paco Ibáñez in 2004, Montserrat Figueras, Rolf Lislevand and Manolo Sanlucar in 2005, The National and Sergio Lopez in 2006, Caetano Veloso in 2007, and the Rumberos Catalans, Bernardo Sandoval, Peter Finger and Aaron and Bryce Dessner in 2008. The 2009 edition was curated by Vincent Moon and featured a line-up of indie bands playing on the instruments of Yuri Landman. This event was filmed for a documentary by Moon.
