= Missing You (The Marcy Brothers album) =

Studio album by The Marcy Brothers
- Released: October 23, 1989
- Genre: Country
- Length: 29:30
- Label: Warner Bros.
- Producer: Ron Haffkine

The Marcy Brothers chronology
Growin' Up Country (1983)	Missing You (1989)	The Marcy Brothers (1991)

Singles from Missing You
- 1. "The Things I Didn't Say" Released: March 1988; 2. "Threads of Gold" Released: January 1989; 3. "Cotton Pickin' Time" Released: April 1989; 4. "You're Not Even Crying" Released: September 1989; 5. "Missing You" Released: December 1989

Missing You is the second studio album by American country music trio The Marcy Brothers and their major label debut album. It was released on October 23, 1989, via Warner Bros. Records. The album includes the hit single "Cotton Pickin' Time". It is also the only charting album of the Marcys', peaking at number 75 on the Billboard Top Country Albums chart in early 1990.

== Critical reception ==
In a review of the album for AllMusic, Jason Ankeny called the Marcy Brothers a "close harmony trio."

== Track listing ==
Missing You track listing
No.	Title	Writer(s)	Length
1.	"You're Not Even Crying"	Steve Seskin, Sandy Knox	2:46
2.	"I Don't Want to Be Alone Tonight"	Shel Silverstein	2:54
3.	"Missing You"	Becky Ryan, Lee Johnson	2:31
4.	"People Still Fall in Love"	Thom Schuyler	3:11
5.	"Song on the Radio"	Kevin Marcy, Kris Marcy, Kendal Marcy	2:55
6.	"Cotton Pickin' Time"	Even Stevens, Paul Overstreet	3:08
7.	"Boys You Gotta Learn to Dance"	Tony Haselden, Paul Harrison	2:41
8.	"Threads of Gold"	Allen Shamblin, Don King	3:07
9.	"The Things I Didn't Say"	Silverstein	3:12
10.	"Walkin' Shoes"	Milton Brown, Overstreet	3:26

== Personnel ==
Compiled from liner notes.

Musicians

- Scott Baggett - bass
- Don Barrett - bass
- Eddie Bayers - drums
- David Briggs - keyboards
- Mark Casstevens - acoustic guitar
- Gene Crisman - drums
- Rick Durrett - keyboards
- Bobby Emmons - keyboards
- Jimmy English - electric guitar
- Sonny Garrish - steel guitar
- Steve Gibson - acoustic guitar, electric guitar, dobro
- David Humphreys - percussion
- Clayton Ivey - keyboards
- Leo Jackson - acoustic guitar
- Shane Keister - keyboards
- Mike Leech - bass
- Brent Mason - electric guitar
- Kendal Marcy - acoustic guitar, mandolin, backing vocals
- Kevin Marcy - lead vocals
- Kris Marcy - backing vocals
- Randy McCormick - keyboards
- Johnny Neel - keyboards
- Mark O'Connor - fiddle, mandolin
- Dave Pomeroy - bass
- Don Potter - acoustic guitar
- Tom Robb - bass
- Brent Rowan - acoustic guitar, electric guitar
- Larry Sasser - steel guitar, dobro, slide guitar
- Mike Seavers - acoustic guitar
- Nick Shetterly - bass, acoustic guitar
- Lisa Silver - fiddle
- Bobby Thompson - acoustic guitar
- Lonnie Wilson - drums
- Bobby Woods - keyboards
- Reggie Young - electric guitar

Technical

- Scott Baggett - engineering
- Ron Haffkine – production
- Chris Hammond - engineering
- Pat Holt - engineering
- Mike Daniel - engineering
- Denny Knight – recording, mixing
- Lynn Peterzell – engineering
- Mike Poole - engineering
- Hank Williams – mastering

== Chart performance ==
Chart (1990)	Peak position
US Top Country Albums (Billboard)	75

=== Singles ===
Year	Single	Peak positions
Year	Single	US Country
1988	"The Things I Didn't Say"	68
1989	"Threads of Gold"	52
1989	"Cotton Pickin' Time"	34
1989	"You're Not Even Crying"	70
1990	"Missing You"	79
