= Up Close and Personal =

Up Close and Personal or variants may refer to:

- Up Close & Personal (film), a 1996 film starring Robert Redford and Michelle Pfeiffer
- Up Close & Personal with PZ, a 2011 Indian celebrity talk show hosted by actress Preity Zinta

== Music ==
- Up Close and Personal Tour (disambiguation)
  - Number Ones, Up Close and Personal, a concert tour by Janet Jackson
  - Up Close and Personal Tour (Guns N' Roses), 2012
  - Up Close and Personal Tour, McFly
- "Up Close and Personal", a 2006 single by South

=== Albums ===
- Up Close and Personal (Angie Martinez album), 2001
- Up Close and Personal (Judith Durham album), 2009
- Up! Close and Personal, Shania Twain DVD
- Up Close & Personal (Vicki Genfan album), 2006
- Up Close and Personal - Live at SWR1, by Ray Wilson
- Up Close and Personal, by Jay Perez
- Up Close And Personal! Live In Germany, by Demon
