= Speak Softly (You're Talking to My Heart) =

Single by Gene Watson

from the album Old Loves Never Die
- B-side: "'Til Melinda Comes Around
- Released: February 27, 1982
- Genre: Country
- Length: 2:11
- Label: MCA
- Songwriter(s): Jessie Mendenhall, Steve Spurgin
- Producer(s): Russ Reeder, Gene Watson

Gene Watson singles chronology
"Fourteen Carat Mind" (1981)	"Speak Softly (You're Talking to My Heart)" (1982)	"This Dream's on Me" (1982)

"Speak Softly (You're Talking to My Heart)" is a song written by Jesse Mendenhall and Steve Spurgin, and recorded by American country music artist Gene Watson. It was released in February 1982 as the second single from album Old Loves Never Die. The song reached number nine on the Billboard Hot Country Singles and Tracks chart.

== Chart performance ==
Chart (1982)	Peak position
US Hot Country Songs (Billboard)	9
Canadian RPM Country Tracks	4
