= The Marcy Brothers (album) =

Studio album by The Marcy Brothers
- Released: July 9, 1991
- Genre: Country
- Length: 33:53
- Label: Atlantic
- Producer: Nelson Larkin; Ron Reynolds

The Marcy Brothers chronology
Missing You (1989)	The Marcy Brothers (1991)

Singles from The Marcy Brothers
- 1. "She Can" Released: June 1991; 2. "Why Not Tonight" Released: November 1991

The Marcy Brothers is the self-titled third studio album by American country music trio The Marcy Brothers. It was released on July 9, 1991, via Atlantic Records.

== Critical reception ==
In a review of the album for AllMusic, Jason Ankeny praised the Marcy Brothers' original version of "Don't Tell My Heart."

== Track listing ==
No.	Title	Writer(s)	Length
1.	"Why Not Tonight"	Chris Waters, Bucky Jones, Tom Shapiro	2:38
2.	"Still Some Love"	Rory Bourke, Mike Reid	3:21
3.	"Call Me Lonely"	Bernie Nelson, Scott Miller	3:38
4.	"Everybody Needs a Hero"	Max D. Barnes, Troy Seals	3:05
5.	"I Just Missed You"	Jerry Vandiver, Rob Crosby	4:30
6.	"The Only People in the World"	Ronny Scaife, Bourke	3:07
7.	"She Can"	Steve Seskin, Austin Gardner	3:26
8.	"By the Dawn's Early Light"	Paul Overstreet, Even Stevens	3:08
9.	"The Lady I Love"	Doug Gill, Tony Laiolo	4:03
10.	"Don't Tell My Heart"	Don Von Tress	2:57

== Personnel ==
Compiled from liner notes.

Musicians

- Ken Bell - acoustic guitar
- Larry Byrom - electric guitar
- Sonny Garrish - steel guitar, dobro
- Clayton Ivey - keyboards
- Jerry Kroon - drums
- Gary Lunn - bass
- Kendal Marcy - acoustic guitar, backing vocals
- Kevin Marcy - acoustic guitar, lead vocals
- Kris Marcy - electric guitar, backing vocals
- Don Potter - acoustic guitar
- Ron Reynolds - electric guitar, percussion
- Brent Rowan - electric guitar
- Nick Shetterly - bass
- John Willis - electric guitar, acoustic guitar

Technical

- Lou Bradley - engineering
- Tim Farmer - engineering
- Nelson Larkin - production
- Greg Parker – engineering
- Ron Reynolds - production, engineering
- Hank Williams – mastering

== Chart performance ==
=== Singles ===
Year	Single	Peak positions	
Year	Single	US Country	CAN Country
1991	"She Can"	71	78
1991	"Why Not Tonight"	—	—
"—" denotes releases that did not chart
