= Masada Guitars =

Masada Anniversary Edition Vol. 1: Masada Guitars

Studio album by John Zorn
- Released: January 2003
- Genre: Jazz, klezmer
- Length: 74:39
- Label: Tzadik TZ 7171
- Producer: John Zorn

John Zorn chronology
Talisman: Live in Nagoya (2002)	Masada Anniversary Edition Vol. 1: Masada Guitars (2003)	Voices in the Wilderness (2003)

Masada Anniversary chronology
Masada Guitars (2003)	Voices in the Wilderness (2003)

Masada Anniversary Edition Vol. 1: Masada Guitars is the first album in a series of five releases celebrating the 10th anniversary of John Zorn's Masada songbook project.

== History ==
Masada Guitars was the first release in 2003 of a series commemorating the tenth anniversary of Zorn's group Masada and the 205-song Masada songbook. Each song is written in accordance with a number of rules, including the maximum number of staves, the modes or scales that are used, and the fact that the songs must be playable by any small group of instruments. The album features 21 Masada songs performed by solo guitar. The tracks are split between three performers: Marc Ribot, Bill Frisell and Tim Sparks.

== Reception ==
Professional ratings
Review scores
Source	Rating
All About Jazz	(not rated)
Allmusic	4/5 stars
The Penguin Guide to Jazz	3.5/4 stars
Pitchfork Media	7.7/10 stars

Masada Guitars received mostly favorable reviews. Allmusic music critic Sean Westergaard stated "Those expecting an electric romp through the Masada songbook might be disappointed; Masada Guitars consists entirely of solo, mostly acoustic performances. Preconceptions aside, this is a beautiful album. Marc Ribot, Bill Frisell, and Tim Sparks each bring their own voice to these tunes: Sparks with his rich fingerpicking, Ribot coming from his classical guitar background, and Bill Frisell with his unmistakable ethereal tone."

In his review for All About Jazz, Farrell Lowe writes of the stripped-down nature of the songs revealing their essence, writing: "This recording also reveals how powerful the modern guitar can be. Zorn chose three very distinctive players to interpret these pieces. Each guitarist shapes and cuts his own world of sound out of Zorn's compositions."

Chris Dahlen was less positive about the disc as a whole, considering it too long: "This disc is almost indulgently long, crammed with 21 similar pieces that get dignified, mid-tempo readings. That's a lot of samey acoustic guitar to wade through, and the fact that it's all pretty doesn't justify the length. But the upside is that Zorn knows where he's going, and he knows what he wants from these guitarists; he's just willing to give them a lot of chances to hit it." He calls Sparks' arrangements "rigorous and exciting", Ribot as "plain-spoken" and Frisell the "maverick" of the three.

Acoustic Guitar named Masada Guitars as essential in their article "20 Years of Essential Acoustic Albums".

== Track listing ==
All compositions by John Zorn. Performer's name in parentheses.

1. "Abidan" – 3:31 (Frisell)
2. "Kodashim" – 3:37 (Sparks)
3. "Kedem" – 3:29 (Ribot)
4. "Bikkurim" – 3:00 (Frisell)
5. "Ravayah" – 4:01 (Sparks)
6. "Hadasha" – 2:45 (Ribot)
7. "Katzatz" – 3:37 (Frisell)
8. "Kanah" – 3:27 (Sparks)
9. "Hodaah" – 3:24 (Ribot)
10. "Kisofim" – 4:53 (Frisell)
11. "Sippur" – 2:48 (Sparks)
12. "Sansanah" – 5:54 (Ribot)
13. "Galgalim" – 1:45 (Ribot)
14. "Elilah" – 3:05 (Frisell)
15. "Kedushah" – 4:32 (Sparks)
16. "Shevet" – 3:11 (Ribot)
17. "Kochot" – 3:56 (Frisell)
18. "Tzalim" – 2:21 (Ribot)
19. "Kivah" – 2:33 (Ribot)
20. "Avelut" – 4:05 (Frisell)
21. "Moshav" – 3:54 (Ribot)

== Personnel ==
- Marc Ribot – guitar
- Bill Frisell – guitar
- Tim Sparks – guitar
