= The Jukebox Played Along =

Single by Gene Watson

from the album Back in the Fire
- B-side: "Somewhere Over You"
- Released: July 22, 1989
- Genre: Country
- Length: 3:00
- Label: Warner Bros.
- Songwriter(s): Ken Bell, Charles Quillen
- Producer(s): Gregg Brown, Ed Seay, Paul Worley

Gene Watson singles chronology
"Back in the Fire" (1989)	"The Jukebox Played Along" (1989)	"The Great Divide" (1989)

"The Jukebox Played Along" is a song recorded by American country music artist Gene Watson. It was released in July 1989 as the third single from the album Back in the Fire. The song reached #24 on the Billboard Hot Country Singles & Tracks chart. The song was written by Ken Bell and Charles Quillen.

== Chart performance ==
Chart (1989)	Peak position
US Hot Country Songs (Billboard)	24
Canadian RPM Country Tracks	40
