= One String Leads to Another =

Studio album by Tim Sparks
- Released: 1999
- Recorded: November 1998
- Length: 48:38
- Label: Acoustic Music Records
- Producer: Tim Sparks

Tim Sparks chronology
Guitar Bazaar (1995)	One String Leads to Another (1999)	Neshamah (1999)

One String Leads to Another is the third solo recording by American guitarist Tim Sparks, released in 1999.

== History ==
The title is taken from a quote by John Renbourn. While speaking of Davey Graham's travels in Morocco "where he came across a tuning used on an exotic, North African string instrument. Davey tried to adapt this to his guitar. Well, one string leads to another and before you know it, he's come up with DADGAD guitar tuning."

Sparks wrote the songs while spending time in Mexico. "I found myself exploring the sounds of where I grew up in North Carolina, you know, more native American sounds, and cross-pollinating them, if you will, with sounds from around the world. Sounds I have explored in music from other cultures".

== Reception ==
Professional ratings
Review scores
Source	Rating
AllMusic	3/5 stars
Down Beat	(no rating)
Guitar Player	(no rating)

Stacia Proefrock wrote for AllMusic "Tim Sparks has issued another winner. Rather than merely imitating one particular style throughout a certain song, he instead absorbs the techniques and melodies of many different cultures and fuses them together to make them his own." Andy Ellis of Guitar Player magazine stated "There are many skilled solo-acoustic guitarists making CDs today, but few can match Sparks' verve and intensity. On this live and natural-sounding record, we hear a restless, probing mind, rather than a series of refined techniques." The June 2000 issue of Down Beat magazine gave a favorable review stating: "While Sparks' music includes jazz and world music sensibilities, the overall thrust to this set of original compositions (minus one) suggests a blend of folksy, backwoods fingerpicking that's strongly melodic and very intimate. The pacing is very good, and Sparks' fingerstyle, musical sleight-of-hand has one hearing classical technique one moment, flat-out blues the next."

== Track listing ==
All compositions by Tim Sparks except "Eu So Quero Em Xodo" by Dominguinhos.

1. "L'etoile de Mer" – 3:26
2. "Waltz with a Mermaid" – 2:51
3. "Cornbread and Baklava" – 5:35
4. "La Soledad" – 4:02
5. "Mr. Marques" – 3:30
6. "Eu So Quero Em Xodo" – 8:35
7. "Elegy for Max" – 2:56
8. "Trap Hill Breakdown" – 3:57
9. "One String Leads to Another" – 2:19
10. "Pata Negra" – 4:44
11. "The Amersterdam Cakewalk" – 3:45
12. "A Lucky Hand" – 2:32

== Personnel ==
- Tim Sparks - acoustic guitar
- Dean Magraw - acoustic guitar on "Eu So Quero Em Xodo"

== Production notes ==
- Produced by Peter Finger
- Engineered by Peter Finger at Acoustic Music Studio in Osnabruck, Germany
