= The Marcy Brothers =

American country music trio

- Origin: Oroville, California, United States
- Genres: Country
- Years active: 1983–1999
- Labels: Warner Bros. Atlantic
- Past members: Kevin Marcy; Kris Marcy; Kendal Marcy

The Marcy Brothers were an American country music trio formed in Oroville, California, in 1983 and disbanded in 1999. The trio consisted of three brothers: Kevin, Kris, and Kendal Marcy. They released two albums for divisions of Warner Music Group and charted six singles on the Billboard country charts. Their highest hit was "Cotton Pickin' Time" at No. 34.

== Music career ==
The Marcy Brothers' career started with some independent releases throughout the early 1980's but their major label debut album, Missing You, was released on October 23, 1989, on Warner Bros. Records' Nashville division. The album peaked at No. 75 on the Billboard Top Country Albums chart and saw a total of five single charting, including their highest chart single, "Cotton Pickin' Time", which reached No. 34 on the Hot Country Singles & Tracks (now Hot Country Songs) chart in 1989. Other single releases include "The Things I Didn't Say", "Threads of Gold", "You're Not Even Crying", and the title track. Blake Shelton covered "Cotton Pickin' Time" on his 2004 album Blake Shelton's Barn & Grill.

On July 9, 1991, the group released their self-titled third studio album on Warner Bros.' sister label, Atlantic Records. This album produced the singles "She Can" and "Why Not Tonight" before the trio exited the label and disbanded. Also included on the album was the Don Von Tress composition "Don't Tell My Heart", a song which would later become a five-week Number One on the country charts in 1992 when Billy Ray Cyrus recorded it under the title "Achy Breaky Heart". Kendal has since joined Brad Paisley's road band, the Drama Kings, in which he plays the banjo, keyboards, mandolin, and sings background vocals.

== Members ==
- Kevin Marcy - vocals, acoustic guitar
- Kris Marcy - vocals, guitars
- Kendal Marcy - vocals, guitars, mandolin, keyboards, piano

== Discography ==
=== Albums ===
Title	Album details	Peak positions
Title	Album details	US Country
Growin' Up Country	Release date: November 17, 1983; Label: KAM Productions; Producer: The Marcy Brothers	—
Missing You	Release date: October 23, 1989; Label: Warner Bros. Nashville; Producer: Ron Haffkine	75
The Marcy Brothers	Release date: July 9, 1991; Label: Atlantic Records; Producer: Nelson Larkin, Ron Reynolds	—
"—" denotes releases that did not chart

=== Singles ===
Year	Single	Peak chart positions		Album
Year	Single	US Country	CAN Country	Album
1984	"Take It Like a Man"	—	—	Non-album single
1988	"The Things I Didn't Say"	68	—	Missing You
1989	"Threads of Gold"	52	—	Missing You
1989	"Cotton Pickin' Time"	34	—	Missing You
1989	"You're Not Even Crying"	70	—	Missing You
1990	"Missing You"	79	—	Missing You
1991	"She Can"	71	78	The Marcy Brothers
1991	"Why Not Tonight"	—	—	The Marcy Brothers
"—" denotes releases that did not chart

=== Music videos ===
Year	Video	Director
1989	"Cotton Pickin' Time"	
1989	"You're Not Even Crying"	Robert Frey
1991	"She Can"	Joe Pollaro
