= At the Rebbe's Table =

Studio album by Tim Sparks
- Released: April 23, 2002
- Recorded: January 11, 2002
- Genre: Klezmer, world, jazz
- Label: Tzadik
- Producer: Tim Sparks

Tim Sparks chronology
Tanz (2000)	At the Rebbe's Table (2002)	Sidewalk Blues (2009)

At the Rebbe's Table is the third recording by guitarist Tim Sparks on the Tzadik Records label.

== History ==
Producer John Zorn combined Sparks with Masada alumni Greg Cohen and Brazilian percussionist Cyro Baptista on Sparks' previous release Tanz, and this time adds guitarist Marc Ribot on nylon-string guitar and Erik Friedlander on cello.

== Reception ==
Professional ratings
Review scores
Source	Rating
Allmusic	4/5 stars

At the Rebbe's Table received favorable reviews. Allmusic music critic Steven Loewy stated "Sparks treats the melodies respectfully as serious guides to a people's past, and in the process explores the life-affirming nature of the music." JazzTimes critic Josef Woodard wrote "Whatever the heritage or cultural pedigree, it's simply touching music."

Music critic Kirk Albrecht wrote At the Rebbe's Table "...may be Sparks' best yet in capturing the life and cross-pollination richly textured in these 11 selections from the diaspora Jewish communities around the world."

== Track listing ==
1. "Returning from the River" (Fun Tashlach) (Naftule Brandwein) – 4:54
2. "The Keys from Spain" (La Jave Espana) (Flory Jagoda) – 4:30
3. "At the Rebbe's Table" (Baym Rebns Sude) (Klezmer traditional) – 4:09
4. "Beautiful City" (Kirya Yefiefiya) (Yeminite trad.) – 5:13
5. "Tartar Dance" (Der Heisser) (Naftule Brandwein) – 5:13
6. "Mahshav" (John Zorn) – 3:48
7. "Abu's Courtyard" (Hasidic trad.) – 5:24
8. "Walking the In-laws Home" (Fim Di Mekhutonim Aheym) (Naftule Brandwein) – 3:38
9. "La Serena" (The Siren) (Sephardic trad., Greece) – 4:38
10. "Todos Si Hueron" (They Have All Gone) (Flory Jagoda) – 7:03
11. "Sadagora Dance" (Sadagora Chusidl) (Klezmer trad.) – 3:06

== Personnel ==
- Tim Sparks – steel-string acoustic guitar
- Marc Ribot – nylon-string acoustic guitar
- Erik Friedlander – cello
- Greg Cohen – bass
- Cyro Baptista – percussion

== Production notes ==
- Produced by Tim Sparks
- Executive producer: John Zorn
- Recorded by Jim Anderson at Avatar, NJ
- Mastered by Scott Hull at Classic Sound, NTC
- Design by Hueng-Hueng Chin
