= Vicki Genfan =

American singer and guitarist

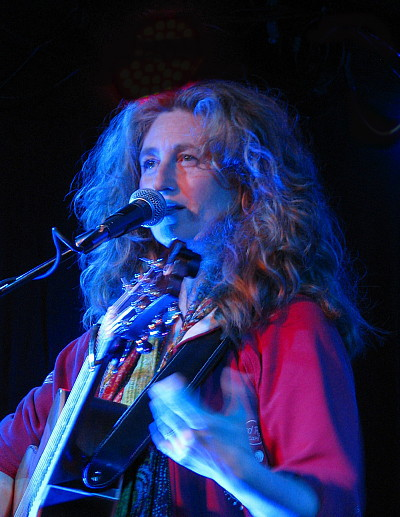
- Vicki Genfan at The Saint in Asbury Park, New Jersey, April 28, 2013

Background information
- Born: June 15, 1959 (age 66); U.S.
- Genres: Pop, folk
- Occupations: Singer, songwriter, musician
- Instrument: Guitar
- Years active: 1991–present
- Labels: Acoustic Music, Vicki Genfan/NafnegV, Harmonic Touch
- Website: www.vickigenfan.com

Vicki Genfan (born June 15, 1959) is an American singer and guitarist.

== Biography ==
Genfan took up the guitar at age five. Her father played twelve-string guitar, mandolin and fiddle, and sang. Her older brother played guitar, too. She studied classical music and jazz at Ithaca College in Ithaca, New York. Besides guitar, Genfan plays piano, banjo, hand percussion, and trombone.

In 1994, she produced her first album, Native, on cassette, but it didn't sell in significant numbers. In 2001, she released a self-produced album, Outside the Box. During the same year, she won the Just Plain Folks Award for the song New Grass. In 2003, the German label Acoustic Music Records released Vicki Genfan Live, an album recorded at Open Strings Festival in Osnabrück, Germany. In 2004, she placed second at Mountain Stage New Song Festival in West Virginia with her song, Eleanor. In 2006, she released the double album Up Close & Personal.

Genfan has worked with Tommy Emmanuel, Laurence Juber, Kaki King, and Jennifer Batten. Genfan appeared in several American and international magazines and was labeled "Queen of Open Tunings".

Genfan won Guitar Player magazine's Guitar Superstar '08 contest at San Francisco's Great American Music Hall in September 2008.

She has given lectures and taught at workshops and guitar clinics.

== Technique and equipment ==
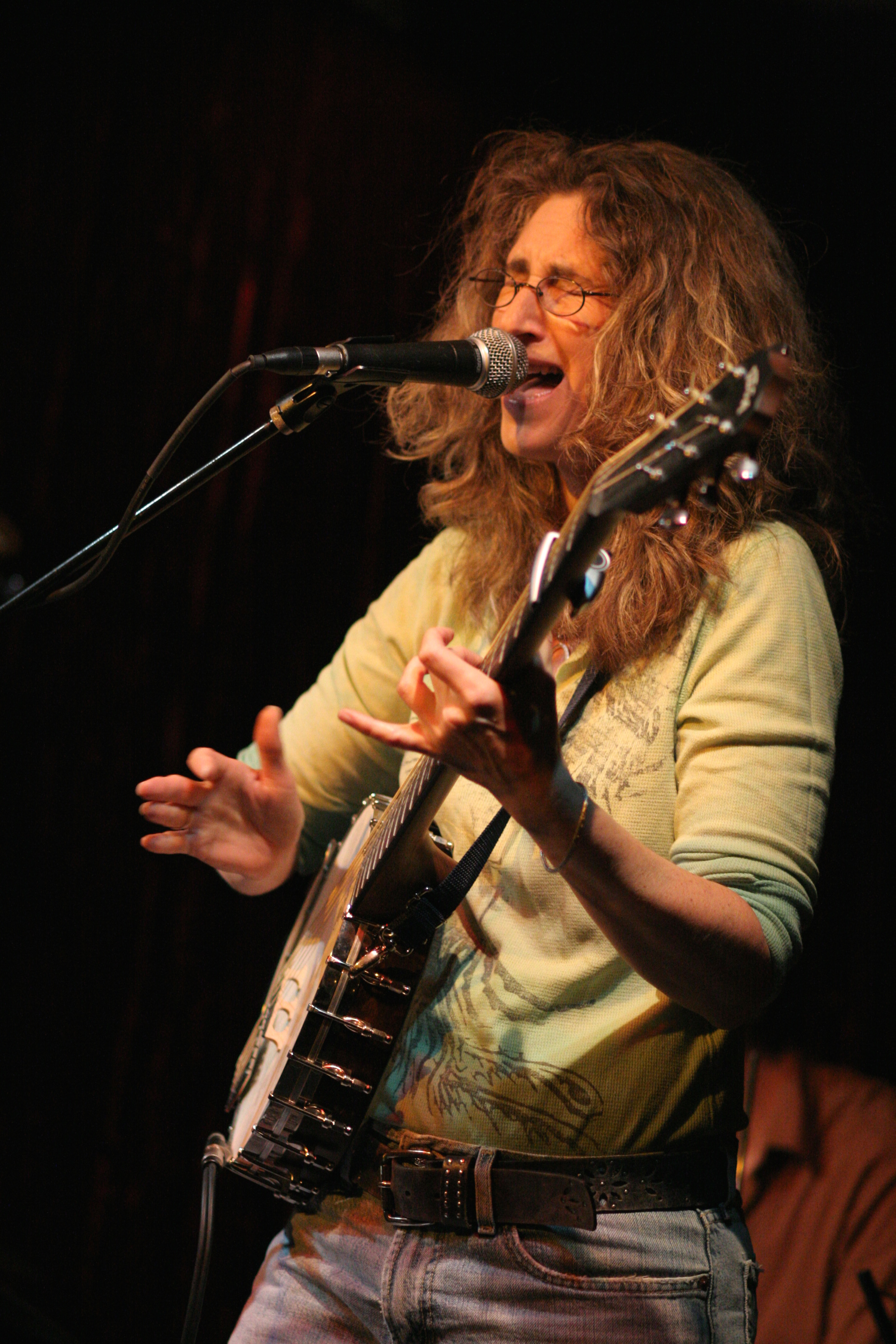
Vicki Genfan performing on banjo, June 2007

Genfan labels her music "folk meets funk". It's a blend of jazz, funk, pop and world music in a contemporary folk context. She uses uncommon open tunings and what she calls a "slap-tap" technique.

Her first musical inspiration was her father. Other influences include James Taylor, Michael Jackson, Pat Metheny, Joni Mitchell, Meshell Ndegeocello, Marvin Gaye, Jonatha Brooke, and Leo Kottke.

Until May 2009 Genfan played a Gibson L-140, a Gibson LG and an Alvarez Silver Anniversary guitar. The Alvarez uses a TrueTone pickup in which two microphones and a L.R. Baggs LB6 pickup send signals to two outlets. Genfan plays a custom Luna guitar built by luthier Gray Burchette and equipped with a MiniFlex internal microphone system and an under-saddle RMC hex pickup.

She owns a Guild 12 string guitar, a Muse 12 string by Luna Guitars, and a Vega 6 string Deering banjo. She uses medium-gauge EXP D'Addario strings. Her engineer, Tay Hoyle, plays a main role in producing Genfan's albums and accompanies her on tour.

== Discography ==
- 1994 – Native (Vicki Genfan)
- 2000 – Outside the Box (Vicki Genfan)
- 2003 – Vicki Genfan Live (Acoustic Music)
- 2006 – Up Close & Personal (Harmonic Touch)
- 2008 – Uncovered (Acoustic Sounds)

As guest

- 1991 – Mistaken Identity, Donna Summer (Atlantic)
- 2000 – Home Away from Home, Dee Carstensen (Exit Nine)
- 2000 – Fourth Floor, Sonya Heller
