= Farewell Party =

Single by Gene Watson

from the album Reflections
- B-side: "I Don't Know How to Tell Her (She Don't Love Me Anymore)"
- Released: February 17, 1979
- Genre: Country
- Length: 4:05
- Label: Capitol
- Songwriter(s): Lawton Williams
- Producer(s): Russ Reeder

Gene Watson singles chronology
"One Sided Conversation" (1978)	"Farewell Party" (1979)	"Pick the Wildwood Flower" (1979)

"Farewell Party" is a song written by Lawton Williams. Lawton also had the original recording in 1960. Little Jimmy Dickens recorded the song in 1961. It was also recorded by American country music artists Johnny Bush and Waylon Jennings, as well as Gene Watson. Watson's cover was released in February 1979 as the second single from the album Reflections. The song reached #5 on the Billboard Hot Country Singles & Tracks chart.

== Cover versions ==
- Alan Jackson on his 1999 album Under the Influence
- Joe Nichols on his 2004 album Revelation
- Heidi Hauge on her 2004 album Country Jewels

== Charts ==
=== Weekly charts ===
Chart (1979)	Peak position
US Hot Country Songs (Billboard)	5
Canadian RPM Country Tracks	9

=== Year-end charts ===
Chart (1979)	Position
US Hot Country Songs (Billboard)	29
