= Love in the Hot Afternoon =

Single by Gene Watson

from the album Love in the Hot Afternoon
- B-side: "Through the Eyes of Love"
- Released: May 1975
- Recorded: 1974
- Genre: Country
- Length: 3:21
- Label: Capitol 4076
- Songwriters: Vince Matthews and Kent Westbury
- Producer: Russ Reeder

Gene Watson singles chronology
| "Bad Water" (1975) | "Love in the Hot Afternoon" (1975) | "Where Love Begins" (1975) |

"Love in the Hot Afternoon" is a song written by Vince Matthews and Kent Westbury, and recorded by American country music artist Gene Watson. It was released in May 1975 as the second single and title track from the album Love in the Hot Afternoon. The song reached number three on the Billboard Hot Country Singles chart, becoming his first top-40 and first top-10 hit on that chart. Two years later, American contralto pop music singer Vicki Lawrence released her female version of this song, with the gender reversed as a promotional single on Private Stock Records.

In 2010, it was covered by Bonnie "Prince" Billy and Matt Sweeney for the Adult Swim Singles Program.

== Chart performance ==
| Chart (1975) | Peak position |
|---|---|
| US Hot Country Songs (Billboard) | 3 |
| Canadian RPM Country Tracks | 3 |
