= Outside the Box (Vicki Genfan album) =

Outside The Box

Studio album by Vicki Genfan
- Released: 2000
- Label: Vicki Genfan (Indie-label)
- Producer: Tay Hoyle & Vicki Genfan

Vicki Genfan chronology
Native	Outside The Box	Vicki Genfan live

Professional ratings
Review scores
Source	Rating
CD Baby	favorable link

Outside The Box is Vicki Genfan's first available release and features both instrumental and vocal songs. It gained wide recognition and was highly acclaimed by critics. The song "New Grass", a fast ride on slapping and tapping changing between odd meters like 7/4 and plain 6/4 or 4/4, won the Just Plain Folks Award in 2001 in the category of best solo instrumental.

== Track listing ==
All songs by Vicki Genfan, except "Amazing Grace" (Traditional)

1. Catch Me
2. Outside the Box
3. Impossinova
4. Mother's Day
5. Offerings
6. New Grass
7. Why don't love sit still
8. Interlude
9. In a Mood
10. Don't Give Up
11. Amazing Grace

== Personnel ==
- Vicki Genfan - acoustic guitar, bass guitar, percussion, vocals
- Danny Wilensky - flute, soprano sax
- Tay Hoyle, Vicki Genfan - producer
- Tay Hoyle - engineering and mixing
- Steve Kadison, Ellen Fitton - mastering
