= Guitar Bazaar =

Second solo recording by Tim Sparks

Studio album by Tim Sparks
- Released: 1995
- Recorded: 1995
- Genres: Folk, world
- Length: 47 minutes
- Label: Acoustic Music Records (31910802)
- Producers: Tim Sparks, Jay M. Fleming

Tim Sparks chronology
The Nutcracker Suite (1993)	Guitar Bazaar (1995)	One String Leads to Another (1999)

Guitar Bazaar is the second solo recording by Tim Sparks on the Acoustic Music Records label, released in 1995.

== History ==
After a journey to Hungary, Yugoslavia and Bosnia in the late 1980s, Sparks began an interest in Eastern European music. He began playing in various world music groups and immersed himself in various styles. He has described Guitar Bazaar as a fusion of Middle Eastern and American roots music. The album includes arrangements of Béla Bartók's Romanian Dances. It was this album that John Zorn heard that led to Sparks' recording of his series of albums for Tzadik Records.

== Reception ==
Professional ratings
Review scores
Source	Rating
Guitar Player	A−

Guitar Player wrote in their review, "If you're getting complacent about your acoustic fingerpicking, you'd better hear Tim Sparks' new CD... There's nothing forced or studied about his playing or compositions: his intense, on-the-edge attack speaks of many nights wailing around campfires in places most of us have never heard of."

== Track listing ==
All compositions by Tim Sparks.

1. "Bach-n-Aliya" – 5:08
2. "The Rain Beggar" – 6:21
3. "Guitar Bazaar" – 3:17
4. "Sleeping Giant" – 9:15
5. "Chasing the Dragon" – 4:40
6. "Rumanian Folk Dances" – 5:19
7. "It's Greek to Me" – 5:28
8. "Sailing to Byzantium" – 4:32
9. "Dr. Smedvig's Berzerka" – 3:40

== Personnel ==
- Tim Sparks - acoustic guitar
- Tim O'Keefe - frame drum, harmonica, doumbec
- Jim Price - violin
- Mark Stillman - accordion
- Yanaris Asimakes - bouzouki

== Production notes ==
- Produced by Tim Sparks and Jay M. Fleming
- Executive producer - Peter Finger
- Engineered by Jay Fleming
