= Tim Sparks =

American musician and composer (born 1954)

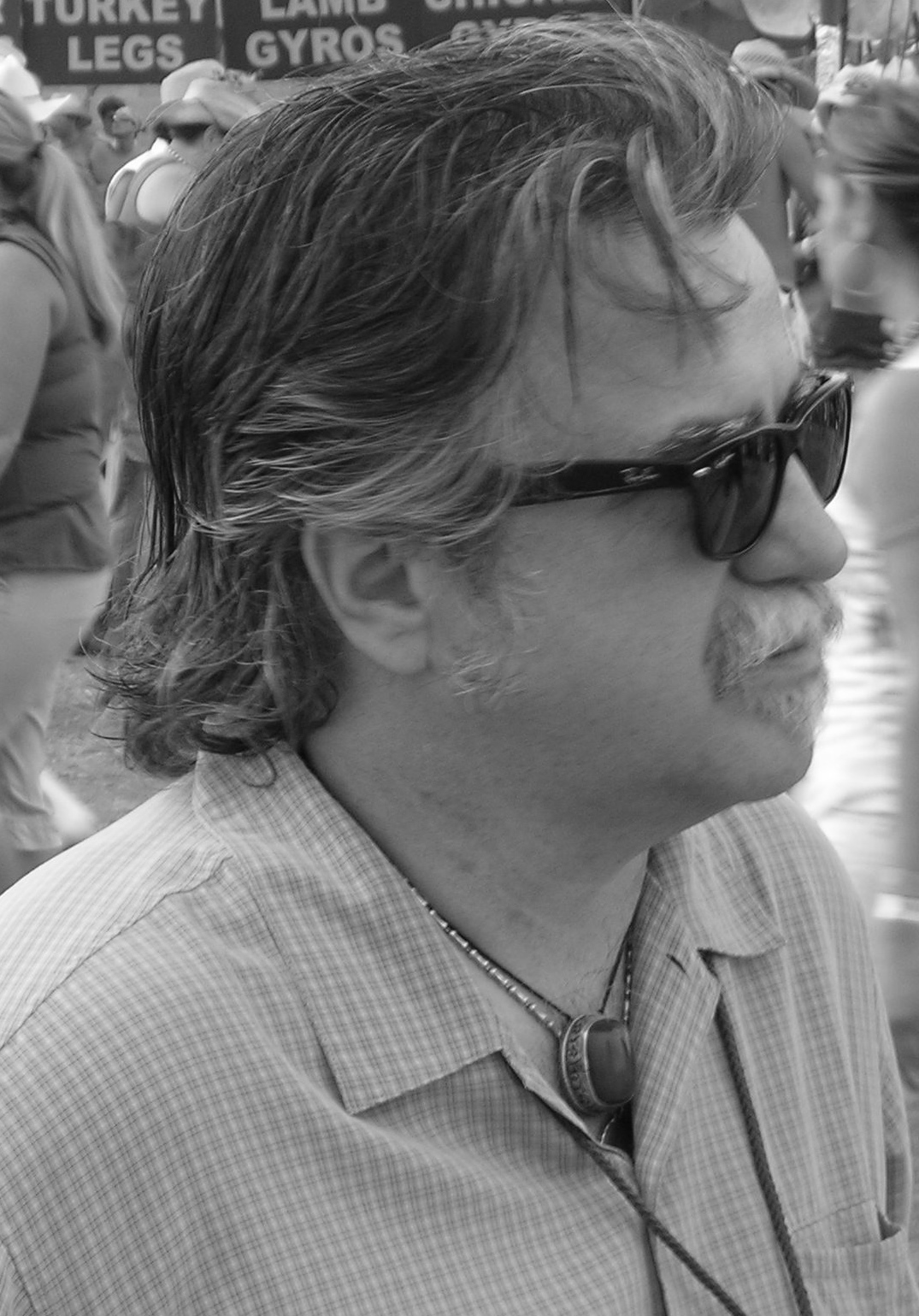
- Sparks in 2006

Background information
- Born: October 31, 1954 (age 71); North Carolina, U.S.
- Genres: Folk, klezmer, classical
- Occupation: Musician
- Instruments: Guitar, requinto, oud
- Years active: 1972–present
- Labels: Tzadik, Acoustic Music
- Website: timsparksguitar.com

Tim Sparks (born October 31, 1954) is an American acoustic guitar player, singer, arranger and composer.

== Life ==
Raised in Winston-Salem, North Carolina, he was given his first guitar when a bout of encephalitis kept him out of school for a year. The music he heard around him was traditional country blues, and the gospel his grandmother played on piano in a small church in the Blue Ridge Mountains, so that's what he taught himself to play.

He was nominated for a scholarship at the prestigious North Carolina School of the Arts. There he studied the classics with Andrés Segovia protegee Jesus Silva. While recording three albums with the seminal vocal jazz ensemble Rio Nido, Sparks also became proficient in jazz styles from Brazilian to Bebop, which brought him several regional music awards including Best Acoustic Guitarist, Best Latin Jazz guitarist, and Best Jazz Guitarist in the Minnesota Music Awards. In 1993 he won the National Fingerstyle Guitar Championship at the Walnut Valley Festival in Winfield, Kansas, playing his adaptation of The Nutcracker Suite by Tchaikovsky.

In the late 90s, Sparks had been immersed in the ethnic music scene and accompanying on guitar in Greek and Klezmer orchestras. He was a featured performer with Crossing Borders at the Bethlehem International Music Festival in July 1995 and has received two Arts Fellowships to pursue ethno-musicological studies. He spent one fall studying Fado and Portuguese guitar in Lisbon. In 1989 he arranged Russian folk music for the Guthrie Theater's adaptation of Uncle Vanya and in 1991 he was commissioned to compose music for Tienanmen, a ballet depicting the student uprising in China, for Myron Johnson's Ballet of the Dolls.

In 2000, Sparks began an association with American composer John Zorn. He has recorded four highly acclaimed CDs of Jewish Klezmer music adapted for acoustic fingerstyle guitar on Zorn's label, Tzadik Records. He earned a McKnight Fellowship to notate and edit the arrangements on Neshamah for publication.

Sparks has performed as an opening act for Dolly Parton and has performed on the same stage as Sándor Szabó, Franco Morone, Cyro Baptista, Isato Nakagawa and Bill Frisell. He has also performed on such national venues as A Prairie Home Companion, the main stage of the Winnipeg Folk Festival and the Chet Atkins Appreciation Society. He has performed at the Edenkoben Festival and the Dresden Guitar Festival in Germany and held a Jazz Guitar teaching residency in Lisbon, Portugal. He frequently tours Japan, France, Belgium, Austria and Hungary.

Sparks is a past faculty member at the University of Minnesota Morris and continues to perform in concert.

== Discography ==
=== Albums ===
- The Nutcracker Suite (1993)
- Guitar Bazaar (1995)
- One String Leads to Another (1999)
- Neshamah (Songs From The Jewish Diaspora) (1999)
- Tanz (with Cyro Baptista and Greg Cohen) (2000)
- At the Rebbe's Table (2002)
- Sidewalk Blues (2009)
- Little Princess (2009)
- Chasin' the Boogie (2014)

=== With others ===
- Dream Café (Greg Brown) (1992)
- Masada Guitars (also featuring tracks by Bill Frisell and Marc Ribot) (2003)
- Le Freylekh Trio featuring Goulash System, (2009, Harmonia Mundi)
- Tsimtsoum, 2010
- Jukebox Dreaming' with James Buckley (2018)

=== Video ===
- In Concert (with Franco Morone)
- Guitar Bazaar: Multicultural Ideas for Fingerstyle Guitar (instructional video) (1995)
- Fingerstyle Guitar: New Dimensions and Explorations (concert video)
- Roots, Rags, and Blues (instructional DVD) (2007)

=== Sheet music ===
- The Nutcracker Suite (1993) (Acoustic Music)
- Balkan Dreams Suite (1996) (Mel Bay)
- Guitar Bazaar (1996) (Acoustic Music)
- Fingerstyle Excursions (1998) (Mel Bay)
- Neshamah with Bruce Muckala (2004) (Mel Bay)
