= Out of the Box =

Out of the box primarily refers to:

- Out of the box (feature), a product that is usable immediately
- Thinking out of the box, or thinking outside the box, a metaphor for thinking in a creative way

Out of the Box may also refer to:

- Out of the Box (Jade Valerie album), 2007
- Out of the Box (Joel Turner album), 2007
- Out of the Box (TV series), Playhouse Disney show
- Out of the Box Publishing, a publisher of board and card games

== See also ==
- Strait Out of the Box, an album by George Strait
- Off-the-shelf (disambiguation)
- Outside the Box (disambiguation)
