= Fourteen Carat Mind =

Single by Gene Watson

from the album Old Loves Never Die
- B-side: "Lonely Me"
- Released: September 1981
- Recorded: June 1981
- Genre: Country
- Length: 2:38
- Label: MCA 51183
- Songwriter(s): Dallas Frazier and Larry Lee
- Producer(s): Russ Reeder and Gene Watson

Gene Watson singles chronology
"Maybe I Should Have Been Listening" (1981)	"Fourteen Carat Mind" (1981)	"Speak Softly (You're Talking to My Heart)" (1982)

"Fourteen Carat Mind" is a song written by Dallas Frazier and Larry Lee, and recorded by American country music artist Gene Watson. It was released in September 1981 as the first single from the album Old Loves Never Die. The song was Watson's 20th country hit and his only song to hit number one on the Billboard Hot Country Singles chart. The single stayed at number one for one week and spent a total of 15 weeks on that chart.

== Charts ==
Chart (1981–1982)	Peak position
US Hot Country Songs (Billboard)	1
Canadian RPM Country Tracks	5

== Covers ==
The Osborne Brothers covered the song on their 1991 album Hillbilly Fever. Daniel Donato has covered the song on his 2021 album Cosmic Country and Western Songs.
