= Peter Finger =

German musician (born 1954)

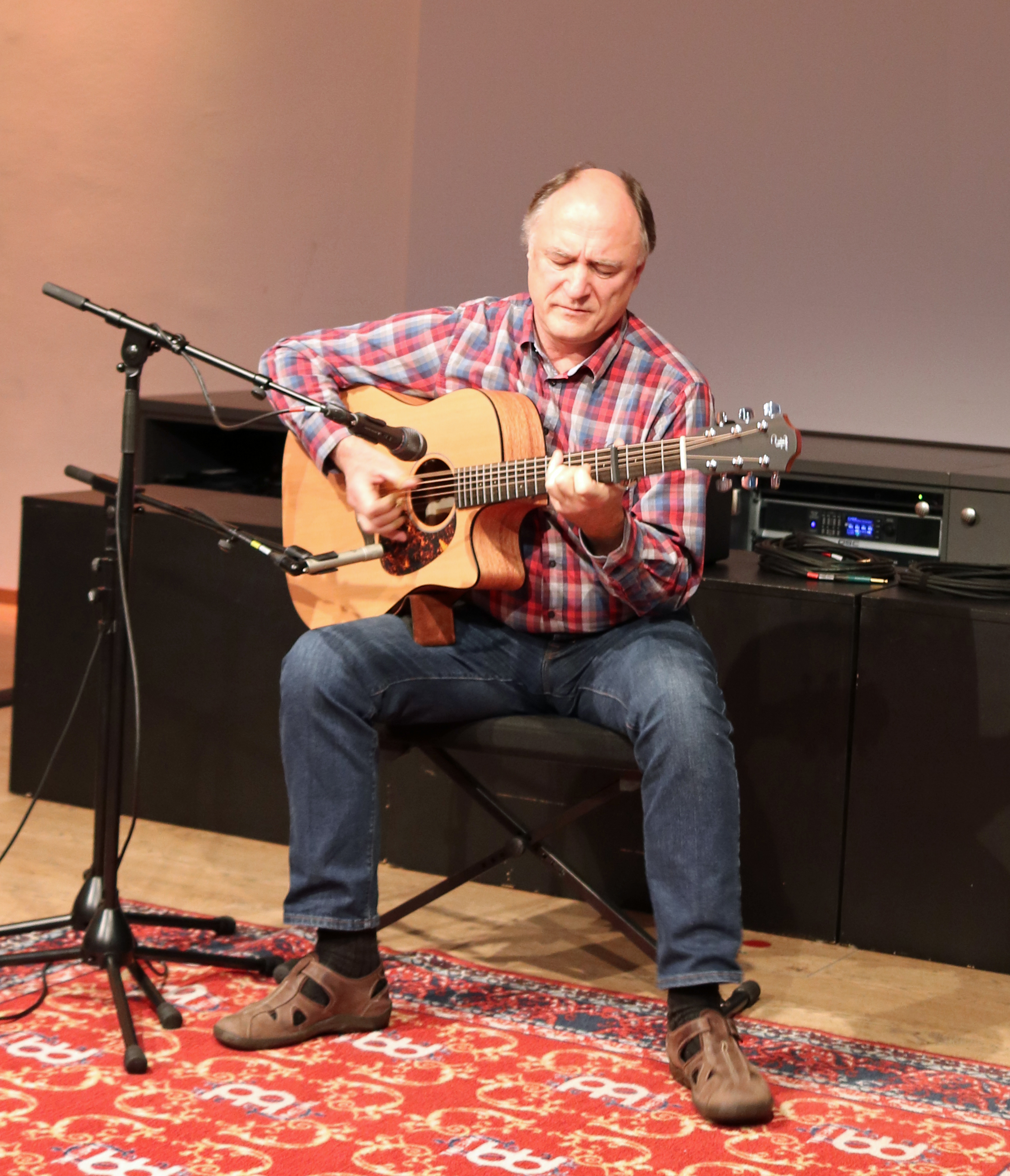

Background information
- Born: 11 October 1954 (age 71); Weimar, Bezirk Erfurt, East Germany
- Genres: Pop rock; folk; blues; new age
- Occupations: Musician; songwriter; composer; record producer
- Instruments: Acoustic guitar; classical guitar; violin; piano; vocals
- Years active: 1970s–present
- Labels: Kicking Mule, Acoustic Music
- Website: peter-finger.com

Peter Finger (born 11 October 1954) is a German acoustic fingerstyle guitarist, songwriter, composer and record producer. His most notable recordings include "Just Another Day in May", "Vielleicht Im Nächsten Leben", "Fanesca", "For You", "101 South", "Blue Horizon", and "No Man's Land".

AllMusic journalist, Tim Sheridan, noted when relating to Finger's 1999 album, Open Strings, that "Finger displays remarkable skill and sensitivity as a musician. The title track is a standout showcase of jaw-dropping technical skill and melodic invention".

== Biography ==
=== Life and career ===
Peter Finger was born in Weimar, Thuringia, Germany. He came from a musical family with his father being employed as an orchestral conductor, and Finger studied both violin and piano before taking lessons on guitar playing at the age of 13. He won first prize for classical violin in the Jugend musiziert on two occasions. He later studied music in Münster.

His debut recording took place in 1973, which saw Bottleneck Guitar Solos issued by Kicking Mule Records. Following further releases, Finger toured from 1976 onwards and performed worldwide. He later expanded his activities to include production work for radio, television and films. In 1981, he commenced composing works for orchestral arrangements, and this led four years later to similar work for television and film productions. In 1985, he was awarded first prize in a competition run by the Oldenburgisches Staatstheater, for his composition "Herbstwind" ("Autumn Wind"). In the same decade, Finger also performed in a duo with the vibraphone player, Florian Poser, and in a trio with Trilok Gurtu and Charlie Mariano.

By 1988, Finger had set up his own music publishing business and record label, the latter being known as Acoustic Music Records. From 1995 onwards he worked as the publisher of the Akustik Gitarre magazine.

Finger returned to recording in the early 1990s, which included the albums Niemandsland (1993) and Solo (1995). In 2000, Finger produced the Open Strings Festival in Germany for the third time.

=== Live performances ===
In 2008, Finger performed at the Guitares au Palais.

In 2009, Finger appeared at the International Çukurova Instrumental Music Festival.

=== Production work ===
Finger has produced albums such as Guitar Bazaar (Tim Sparks, 1995), One String Leads to Another (Tim Sparks, 1999), and Vicki Genfan Live (2003).

== Equipment ==
Finger now exclusively plays his own hand built guitars under his 'Finger' brand, and guitars manufactured by the luthier, George Lowden, Kevin Ryan and has endorsed Lakewood Guitars.

== Discography ==
=== Albums ===
Year	Title	Record label
1973	Bottleneck Guitar Solos	Kicking Mule
1975	Detlef & Finger	Kicking Mule
1975	Bottleneck Guitar Solos	Kicking Mule
1978	The Elf King – Acoustic Rock Guitar	Kicking Mule
1979	Zwei Seiten	Stockfisch Records
1990	The Colors of the Night	Shanachie Records
1993	Niemandsland	Acoustic Music
1995	Innenleben	Beachwood Records
1995	Solo	Acoustic Music
1999	Open Strings	Acoustic Music
2002	Between the Lines	Acoustic Music
2003	Blue Moon	Acoustic Music
2004	Dream Dancer	Acoustic Music
2011	Flow	Acoustic Music
2014	Made of Rosewood	Acoustic Music

=== Compilation albums ===
Year	Title	Record label
1998	The Best of Peter Finger and Florian Poser	Acoustic Music
2001	Collection	Solid Air Records

== See also ==
- Fingerstyle guitar
