= Acoustic Guitar (magazine) =

Quarterly guitar magazine

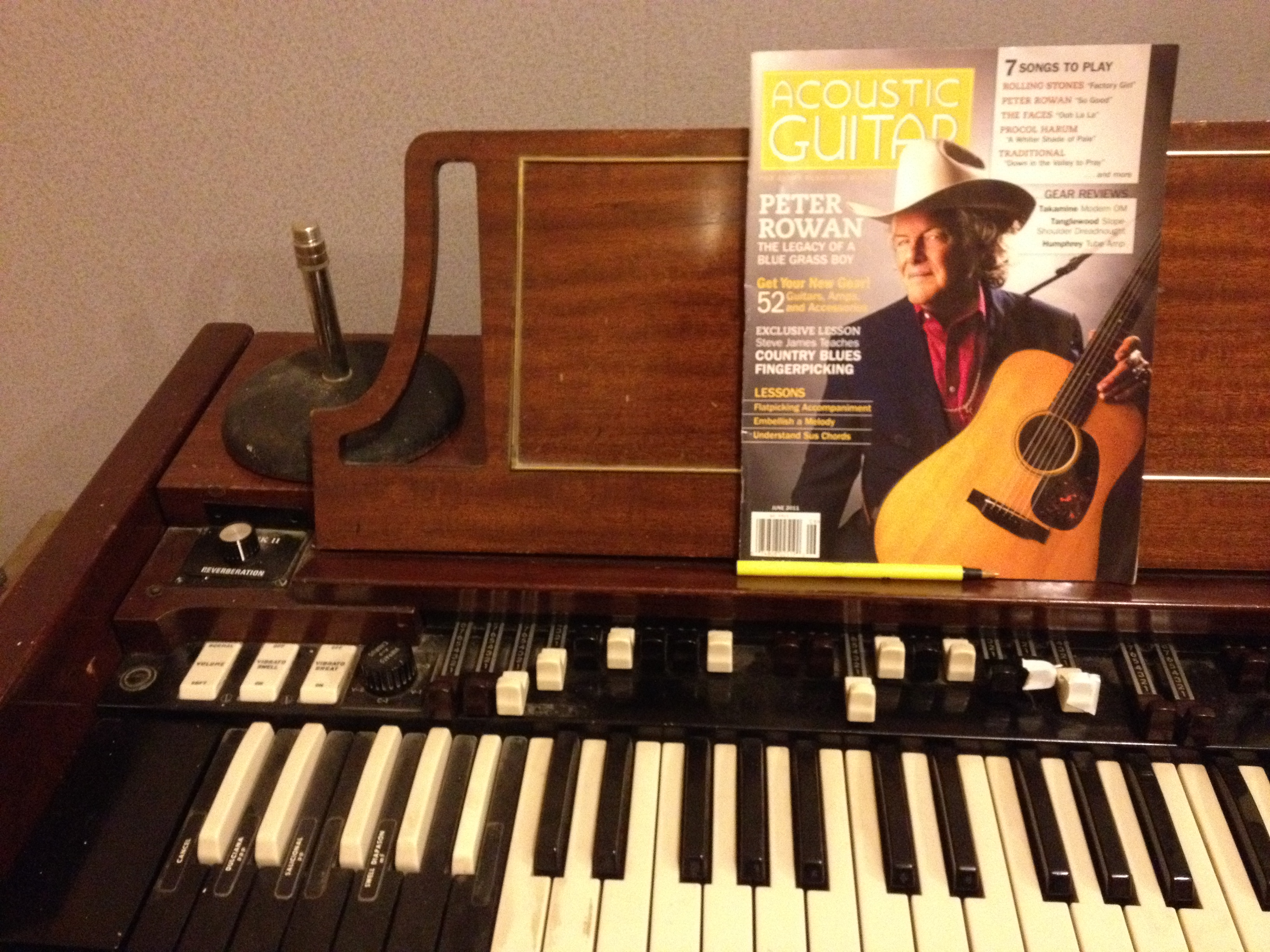
- Editor: Adam Perlmutter
- Categories: Guitar magazines
- Frequency: Quarterly
- Circulation: 54,000
- First issue: July/August 1990
- Company: String Letter Publishing
- Country: United States
- Language: English
- Website: acousticguitar.com
- ISSN: 1049-9261

Acoustic Guitar is a quarterly magazine published in the United States since July/August 1990 by String Letter Publishing. Originally a monthly, it went to a bi-monthly publishing schedule starting with the March 2019, and became a quarterly starting in the spring of 2026. The magazine offers information, inspiration, and instruction related to acoustic guitars for players of all levels from beginners to teachers. Each issue includes three or so songs with notation and tablature, lessons, product reviews and interviews of prominent acoustic musicians.

== History ==
Acoustic Guitar was founded in the summer of 1990 under the editorial direction of Jeffrey Pepper Rodgers as a publication of String Letter Publishing of Richmond, California. String Letter had previously been established in 1985 as the publisher of Strings, a magazine oriented towards players of bowed string instruments.

The first issue featured the first in a series of columns written by Sharon Isbin, a biography on Robert Johnson, a profile of Bruce Cockburn's song craft, and commentary on the "new" MTV Unplugged series. The issue also included musical works for guitar in various styles including folk, classical, and jazz. In its first year of publication, Acoustic Guitar won the Western Publishing Association's "Maggie Award" for Best New Consumer Magazine of the year.

The magazine has seen a number of staff changes over the years. Rodgers remained with the magazine through its tenth anniversary collector's edition in 2000. In the summer of 2005, Dan Gabel was named associate publisher of the magazine. And In 2006, Phil Catalfo became the editor of the magazine. He was followed by Scott Nygaard and Greg Cahill, and Mark Kemp. Cahill is the creator of the publication's popular online video series called Acoustic Guitar Sessions," featuring interviews and performances by the likes of Richard Thompson, Ed Sheeran, the Milk Carton Kids, Ani DiFranco, Robert Earl Keen, Valerie June, Bruce Cockburn, and many others. The magazine's current editor is Adam Perlmutter, who had been a contributing editor for many years.

== Sponsorship ==
The magazine is sponsor or co-sponsor of a number of music festivals, workshops, and trade related events, including MerleFest, the Woodstock Invitational Luthiers Showcase, and the Santa Barbara Acoustic Instrument Celebration.
