= Gene Watson =

American country music singer (born 1943)

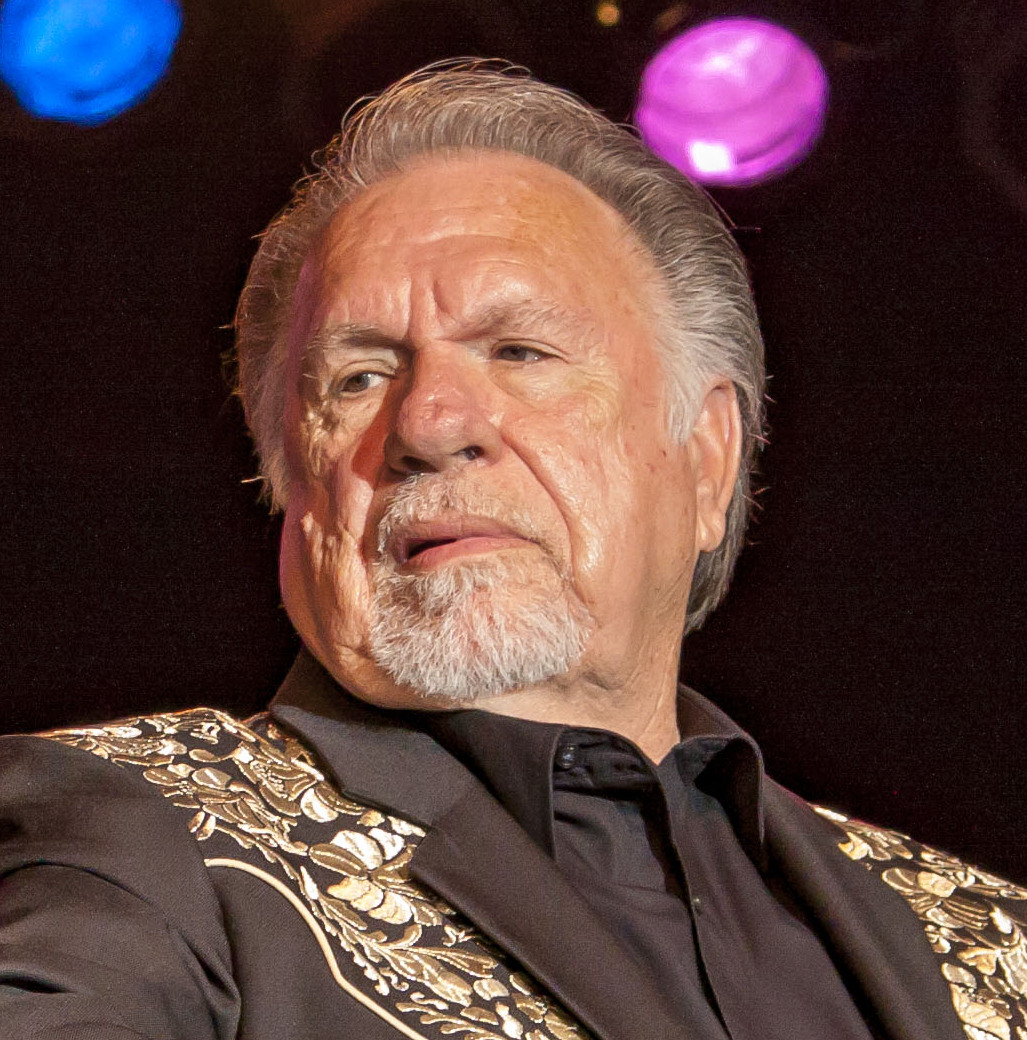
- Watson performing in 2016

Background information
- Born: Gary Gene Watson; October 11, 1943 (age 83); Palestine, Texas, U.S.
- Genre: Country
- Occupation: Singer
- Instruments: Vocals, guitar
- Years active: 1962–present
- Labels: Capitol, MCA, Epic, Warner Bros., Step One, Shanachie
- Website: genewatsonmusic.com

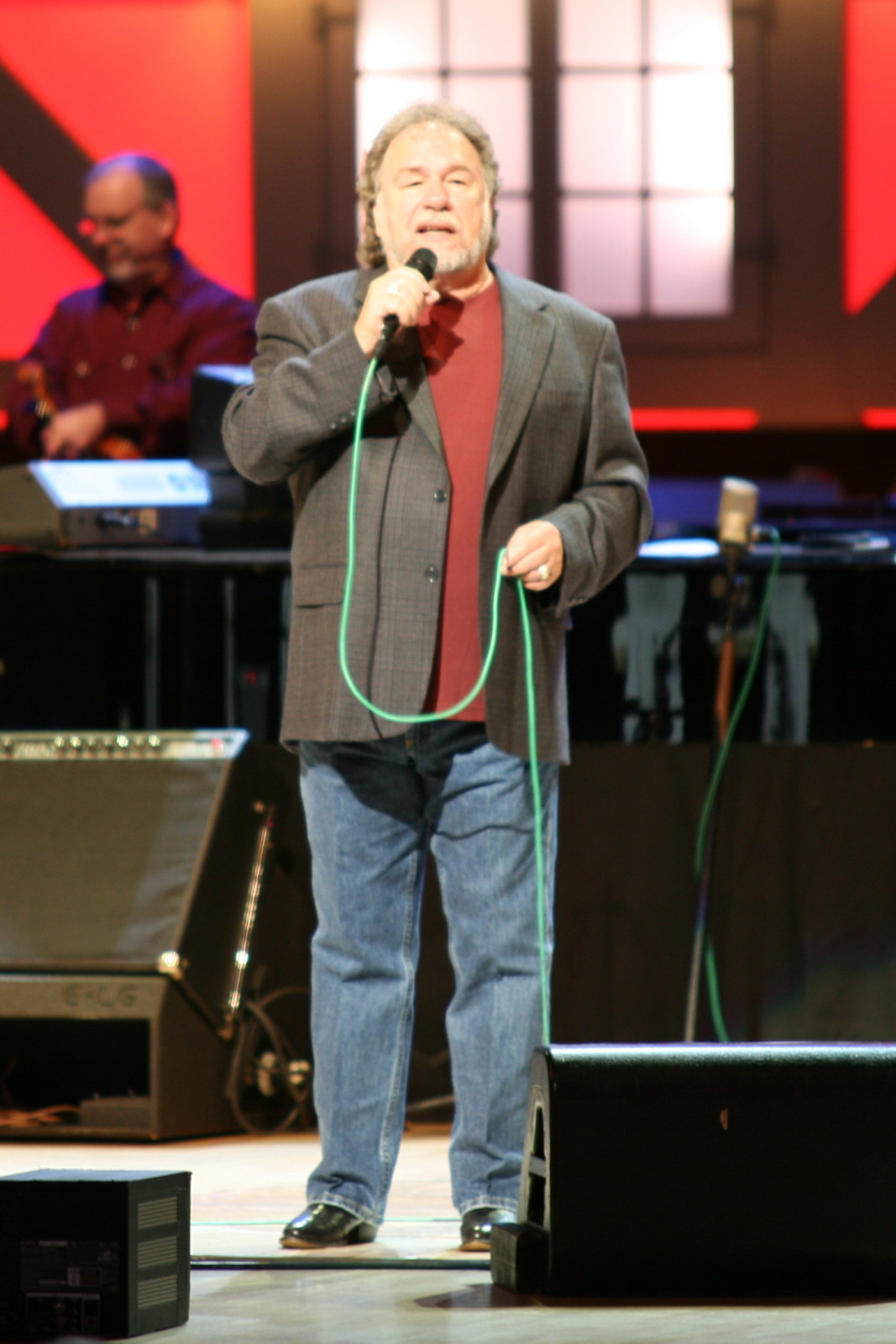
Watson performing at the Grand Ole Opry in 2007

Gary Gene Watson (born October 11, 1943) is an American country music singer. He is most famous for his 1975 hit "Love in the Hot Afternoon", his 1981 number-one hit "Fourteen Carat Mind", and his signature 1979 song "Farewell Party". Watson's long career has included five number-one hits, 21 top 10s, and 48 charted singles.

== Biography ==
Watson was born in Palestine, Texas, United States. He was raised in Paris, Texas, but in 1963, he relocated to Houston. He began his music career in the 1960s, performing in local clubs at night while working in a Houston auto body shop during the day. He recorded for only a few small, regional record labels having a regional hit "Bad Water", until 1975, when Capitol Records picked up his album Love in the Hot Afternoon and released it nationally. The title track, a mid-tempo ballad in three-quarter time, was released in June 1975, and it reached number three on the Billboard Hot Country Singles chart.

Watson's national success continued throughout the late 1970s and early 1980s, as he recorded several Billboard top-40 hits, including "Where Love Begins", "Paper Rosie", "Should I Come Home (or Should I Go Crazy)", "Nothing Sure Looked Good on You", and "Farewell Party," which was released in 1979, and quickly became Watson's signature song, and the namesake of his Farewell Party Band.

In February 2012, Watson, celebrated his 50th year in the music business with the release of Best of the Best, 25 Greatest Hits. (His first single on radio was "If It Was That Easy", released in 1962). The collection of songs was re-recorded to recreate the originals as closely as possible. The project was produced by Dirk Johnson and released on Watson's own Fourteen Carat Music label. In June 2014, Watson released an 11-track CD, My Heroes Have Always Been Country, covering hits by some of his musical heroes, such as Merle Haggard, Ray Price, and Lefty Frizzell. On February 26, 2016, Watson released his 33rd studio album, titled, Real.Country.Music. The 13-track CD contained traditional country music, and the first single release is "Enough for You", a song written by Kris Kristofferson. In 2018, Watson released a gospel music CD titled My Gospel Roots. The first single from the 13-track release, "Old Roman Soldier", hit number one on the Cashbox and Christian Servant Country Gospel charts in June 2018.

Watson was inducted into the Texas Country Music Hall of Fame in 2002, and inducted into the inaugural class of the Houston Music Hall of Fame in August 2013. In 2018, Watson received the Entertainer of the Year award from the R.O.P.E. Awards, an honor he shared with singer Jeannie Seely. It was the first time in the history of the awards that a tie occurred in any category.

Watson was invited to join the Grand Ole Opry by Vince Gill on January 17, 2020. A street in Paris, Gene Watson Boulevard, was named after the singer.

== The Farewell Party Band ==
The Farewell Party Band, his long-time backing band, is named after his 1979 hit single "Farewell Party". Between 1982 and 1984, two studio albums were released credited to Gene Watson and the Farewell Party Band. The band backed Watson on one of his solo albums, and they released one studio album on their own. Several notable musicians were members of the band, such as Tony Booth. While many other members have played with them since the 1980s, below is a timeline of just the members during their recorded output.
