= The Big Gundown (album) =

Studio album by John Zorn
- Released: 1986; 2000 (15th Anniversary Edition)
- Recorded: 1984−1985
- Genre: Avant-garde jazz
- Length: 49:27; 74:54 (15th Anniversary Edition)
- Label: Nonesuch/Icon, Tzadik
- Producer: Yale Evelev

John Zorn chronology
Voodoo (1986)	The Big Gundown (1986)	Cobra (1987)

15th Anniversary Special Edition

The Big Gundown is the third studio album by American composer and saxophonist/multi-instrumentalist John Zorn. It comprises radically reworked covers of tracks by the Italian film composer Ennio Morricone.

The album is named after a 1966 Spaghetti Western of the same name, directed by Sergio Sollima, starring Lee Van Cleef, and scored by Morricone. The album was first released in 1985 on the Nonesuch/Icon label. In 2000 a remastered 15th Anniversary Edition with additional tracks was released on CD on Zorn's Tzadik Records label.

In 1985 Zorn had been working in New York City's experimental music scene for almost a decade (the album was originally to be called "Once Upon a Time in the Lower East Side"), but The Big Gundown launched him to wider prominence. In the notes for the 2000 reissued CD, Zorn describes The Big Gundown as representing a creative breakthrough as well for being the first time he worked extensively with multitrack recording, overdubbing and ornate orchestration. Though his main instrument is alto sax, Zorn did not play on most tracks, adding only a few touches of piano, game calls, harpsichord or musical saw.

== Reception ==
Professional ratings
Review scores
Source	Rating
AllMusic	4.5/5 stars
The Penguin Guide to Jazz	👑
Spin	(favorable)
Spin Alternative Record Guide	9/10

The AllMusic review by Scott Yanow stated, "There are certainly no dull moments on this often-riotous program". The Penguin Guide to Jazz selected this album as part of its suggested "Core Collection" and awarded it a "crown", calling it "utterly remarkable in every way and one of the essential records of the '80s".

The Rolling Stone review by Steve Futterman was less enthusiastic, and Futterman stated, "Despite high-spirited contributions from a first rate cast, Zorn's tentative and analytical remakes tend to bleed Morricone's high drama and joyous kitschiness dry".

== Track listing ==
1. "The Big Gundown" – 7:26
2. "Peur sur la Ville" – 4:16
3. "Poverty (Once Upon a Time in America)" – 3:49
4. "Milano Odea" – 3:02
5. "Erotico (The Burglars)" – 4:27
6. "Battle of Algiers" – 3:50
7. "Giu la Testa (Duck You Sucker!)" – 6:06
8. "Metamorfosi (La Classe Operaia Va In Paradiso)" – 4:37
9. "Tre nel 5000" – 4:37
10. "Once Upon a Time in the West" – 8:44
- The album was re–released and remastered in 2000, with six newly recorded tracks:

11. "The Sicilian Clan" – 3:20
12. "Macchie Solari" – 3:29
13. "The Ballad of Hank McCain" – 5:27
14. "Svegliatti & Uccidi" – 3:03
15. "Chi Mai" – 3:06
16. "The Ballad of Hank McCain (instrumental)" – 5:28

All compositions by Ennio Morricone except "Tre nel 5000" by John Zorn

== Personnel ==
- Orvin Aquart – harmonica
- Cyro Baptista – cuíca
- Joey Baron – drums
- Tim Berne – alto saxophone
- Laura Biscotto – sexy Italian vocals
- Vicki Bodner – oboe, English horn
- Polly Bradfield – violin
- Anthony Coleman – piano, harpsichord, organ, vocals
- Trevor Dunn – bass guitar
- Carol Emanuel – harp
- Reinaldo Fernandes – repinique
- Anton Fier – drums
- Duduka Da Fonseca – caixa
- Bill Frisell – electric guitar
- Fred Frith – electric guitar, bass guitar
- Diamanda Galás – vocals
- Melvin Gibbs – electric bass guitar
- Jody Harris – electric guitar
- Shelley Hirsch – vocals
- Wayne Horvitz – piano, celeste, electronic keyboards
- Bob James – tapes
- Guy Klucevsek – accordion
- Arto Lindsay – batucada contractor, electric guitar, vocals
- Christian Marclay – turntables
- Mark Miller – drums, timpani
- Big John Patton – organ
- Mike Patton – vocals
- Bobby Previte – drums, percussion, timpani, vocals
- Robert Quine – electric guitar
- Vernon Reid – electric guitar
- Ned Rothenberg – shakuhachi, ocarina, jaw harp
- Michihiro Sato – tsugaru shamisen
- Luli Shioi – vocals
- Claudio Silva – pandeiro
- Jorge Silva – surdo
- Jim Staley – trombone, bass trombone
- Toots Thielemans – whistling, harmonica
- David Weinstein – Mirage, microcomputer
- John Zorn – alto saxophone, saw, vocals, harpsichord, game calls, piano
- Martin Bisi – extra recording/engineering
