= Kristallnacht (album) =

Studio album by John Zorn
- Released: 1993
- Recorded: November 9 & 10, 1992
- Genre: Avant-garde
- Length: 42:44
- Labels: Eva, Tzadik
- Producer: John Zorn

John Zorn chronology
Leng Tch'e (1992)	Kristallnacht (1993)	Rituals: Live in Japan (1993)

Kristallnacht is the seventh studio album by John Zorn first released in 1993 on the Japanese Eva label and subsequently in 1995 on Zorn's own Tzadik Records label.

== Background ==
Zorn's compositions for the album were based around the events before, during, and following the infamous Night of Broken Glass and represented his first musical exploration of his Jewish cultural heritage.

Zorn has stated:

It’s tied together with passion and research. Every Jew has to come to grips with the holocaust in some kind of way and that was my statement, that’s how I did it. I do not need to do it again (…) it meant a lot to me. It was like a whole lifetime of denying my Jewish heritage coming out in one piece -- "John Zorn on BBC Jazz File," July 2000.

== Reception ==
Professional ratings
Review scores
Source	Rating
AllMusic	4.5/5 stars
The Penguin Guide to Jazz	4/4 stars

The AllMusic review by Joslyn Layne stated: "John Zorn has created a musical work that powerfully represents the different stages of this historical event... Zorn's forceful undertaking is realized through the expert and passionate musicianship". The Penguin Guide to Jazz said "Here are the seeds of what was to be a wholesale engagement - or re-engagement - with Jewish musical culture, most clearly represented in the Masada project of future years, but retroactively evident throughout the work of the previous decade and more. A key moment, even if the man himself wasn't playing".

== Track listing ==
No.	Title	Length
1.	"Shtetl (Ghetto Life)"	5:55
2.	"Never Again"	11:46
3.	"Gahelet (Embers)"	3:27
4.	"Tikkun (Rectification)"	3:02
5.	"Tzfia (Looking Ahead)"	8:49
6.	"Barzel (Iron Fist)"	2:02
7.	"Gariin (Nucleus - The New Settlement)"	7:59

All compositions by John Zorn
- Recorded and mixed on November 9 & 10 1992 at RPM Studio, New York City

== Personnel ==
- Anthony Coleman: Keyboards
- Mark Dresser: Bass
- Mark Feldman: Violin
- David Krakauer: Clarinet, bass clarinet
- Frank London: Trumpet
- Marc Ribot: Guitar
- William Winant: Percussion
