= Filmworks IV: S&M + More =

Soundtrack album by John Zorn
- Released: 1996
- Genres: Avant-garde, jazz, classical
- Length: 57:11
- Label: Tzadik TZ 7310
- Producer: John Zorn

Filmworks chronology
Filmworks III: 1990–1995 (1995)	Filmworks IV: S&M + More (1996)	Filmworks V: Tears of Ecstasy (1996)

John Zorn chronology
New Traditions in East Asian Bar Bands (1997)	Filmworks IV: S&M + More (1997)	Duras: Duchamp (1997)

Filmworks IV: S/M + More features film scores by John Zorn. The album was released in Japan on Eva Records in 1996 and on Zorn's own label, Tzadik Records, in 1997. It features the music that Zorn wrote and recorded for Maria Beatty's The Elegant Spanking, Beatty and M.M. Serra's A Lot of Fun for the Evil One, "Credits Included" written for the film of the same name directed by Jalal Toufic and "Maogai", written for a piano scene in a film by Hiroki Ryuichi.

== Reception ==
The Allmusic review by Stacia Proefrock awarded the album 3 stars noting that "While this album may not contain the precise and complex structures of Zorn's other experimental work, one gets the sense that he gave himself free rein to play a little, and came up with something new".

Professional ratings
Review scores
Source	Rating
Allmusic	3/5 stars

== Track listing ==
All compositions by John Zorn

1. "Pueblo" - 9:04
2. "Elegant Spanking" (Suite) - 14:22
3. "Credits Included" (A Video in Red & Green) a. Politics, b. Asylum - 9:38
4. "Maogai" (Suite & Variations) - 6:19
5. "A Lot of Fun for the Evil One" - 17:48
- (1-3) recorded at Shelley Palmer Studio, New York City
- (4) recorded at Romanisches Cafe, Tokyo
- (5) recorded at Harmonic Ranch, New York City

== Personnel ==
- Marc Ribot (1) - guitar
- Robert Quine (1) - guitar
- Anthony Coleman (1) - organ
- Chris Wood (1) - bass
- Cyro Baptista (1) - percussion
- Joey Baron (1) - drums
- Carol Emanuel (2) - harp
- Jill Jaffee (2) - viola
- Erik Friedlander (2) - cello
- Jim Pugliese (2) - vibes, percussion
- Kuroda Kyoko (4) - piano
- John Zorn (3,5) - sound design, keyboards
