= Freakish (disambiguation) =

Freakish is a something extraordinary in appearance or behaviour.

Freakish may also refer to:

- Freakish (TV series), an American television horror series
- Freakish (Anthony Coleman album), 2009
- Freakish (Joe Gideon & the Shark album), 2013
