= Spillane (album) =

Studio album by John Zorn
- Released: 1987
- Recorded: June–August 1986, June & September 1987 at Radio City Studios, New York, NY; Russian Hill Recording, San Francisco, CA and Metal Box Studio, Tokyo, Japan
- Genre: Avant-garde
- Length: 54:01
- Label: Elektra Nonesuch
- Producer: John Zorn, David Breskin

John Zorn chronology
Cobra (1987)	Spillane (1987)	News for Lulu (1988)

Spillane is an album by American composer and saxophonist/multi-instrumentalist John Zorn, composed of three "file-card pieces", as well as a work for voice, string quartet and turntables.

It is named after mystery writer Mickey Spillane, whose novels featuring detective Mike Hammer provided the basis for the album's title track. Zorn wrote Spillane on a series of index cards, each containing an outline or instruction for the musicians that was intended to evoke scenes from one of Spillane's novels. One card states: "Scene of the crime #1 -- high harp harmonics, basses and trombone drone, guitar sonorities, sounds of water dripping and narration on top." Thus, the musicians are not given traditional sheet music, but a series of cues or outlines that encourage improvisation.

Zorn later released the composition "Spillane" on the compilation album Godard/Spillane (1999).

== Reception ==
The AllMusic review by Stephen Cook stated: "Spillane is not only one of the highlights in Zorn's catalog, but also makes for a fine introduction to the composer's vast body of work".

Professional ratings
Review scores
Source	Rating
AllMusic	4.5/5 stars
The Penguin Guide to Jazz	4/4 stars

== Track listing ==
No.	Title	Length
1.	"Spillane"	25:12
2.	"Two-Lane Highway: Preacher Man/White Line Fever/Nacogdoches Gumbo/East Texas Freezeout/San Angelo Release/Rollin' to Killeen/Blowout/Devil's Highway/Midnight Standoff/Marchin' for Abilene"	13:30
3.	"Two-Lane Highway: Hico Killer/Long Mile to Houston"	4:46
4.	"Forbidden Fruit (Variations for Voice, String Quartet and Turntables)"	10:20

== Personnel ==
1 - "Spillane" (25:12)
Recorded (June/August 1986) and Mixed (August 1987) by Don Hünerberg at NBC Radio City Studios, New York City
Written and arranged by John Zorn in collaboration with:

- Anthony Coleman - piano, organ, celeste
- Carol Emanuel - harp
- Bill Frisell - guitar
- David Hofstra - bass, tuba
- Bob James - tapes, compact discs
- Bobby Previte - drums, percussion
- Jim Staley - trombone
- David Weinstein - sampling keyboards
- John Zorn - alto saxophone, clarinet
- John Lurie - voice of Mike Hammer
- Robert Quine - voice of Mike Hammer's conscience
- Original texts by Arto Lindsay (and uncredited vocals)

"Two-Lane Highway" (18:16)
2 - Preacher Man/White Line Fever/Nacogdoches Gumbo/East Texas Freezeout/San Angelo Release/Rollin' to Killeen/Blowout/Devil's Highway/Midnight Standoff/Marchin' for Abilene (13:30)
3 - Hico Killer/Long Mile to Houston (4:46)
Recorded (June 1987) and mixed (August 1987) by Don Hünerberg at NBC Radio City Studios, New York City
Conceived and arranged by John Zorn for Albert Collins in collaboration with:

- Albert Collins - guitar, voice
- Robert Quine - guitar
- Big John Patton - organ
- Wayne Horvitz - piano, keyboards
- Melvin Gibbs - bass
- Ronald Shannon Jackson - drums
- Bobby Previte - drums, percussion

4 - "Forbidden Fruit" (Variations for Voice, String Quartet and Turntables) (10:20)
Recorded September 1987 at Russian Hill Recording, San Francisco, by Howard Johnston, and at Metal Box Studio, Tokyo by Ono Seigen. Mixed September 1987 by Ono Seigen at CBS Roppongi Studios, Tokyo.
Written and arranged by John Zorn in collaboration with:

- Kronos Quartet
  - David Harrington - violin
  - John Sherba - violin
  - Hank Dutt - viola
  - Joan Jeanrenaud - cello
- Christian Marclay - turntables
- Hiromi Ōta - voice
- Original texts by Reck

== Credits ==
- Produced by John Zorn
- Two-Lane Highway produced by John Zorn and David Breskin
- Mastering: Robert C. Ludwig
- Art direction and design: Carin Goldberg
- Executive Producer: Robert Hurwitz
- On the cover: Shishido Joe in Kuchibue ga Nagareru Minato Machi, courtesy of Nikkatsu
- Visit Hip's Road in Harajuku, Tokyo, Japan
