= Godard/Spillane =

Compilation album by John Zorn
- Released: July 1999
- Recorded: 1985, 1986, 1987
- Genre: Avant-garde
- Length: 50:07
- Label: Tzadik TZ 7324
- Producer: John Zorn

John Zorn chronology
Live in Jerusalem 1994 (1999)	Godard/Spillane (1999)	The String Quartets (1999)

Godard/Spillane is a compilation album by American composer and saxophonist/multi-instrumentalist John Zorn consisting of music created through Zorn's file-card compositional process. The composition "Godard", a tribute to French film-maker Jean-Luc Godard whose jump-cut technique inspired Zorn's compositional approach, on the French tribute album Jean-Luc Godard|Godard ça vous chante? in 1986 issued by the French Nato label. "Spillane" was first released on Zorn's Nonesuch Records album Spillane in 1987, and "Blues Noël" was first released on the compilation album Joyeux Noël - Merry Christmas Everybody! on Nato in 1987.

== Reception ==
The Allmusic review by Stacia Proefrock awarded the album 5 stars stating "Ironically, "Godard" and "Spillane" both work as unified compositions because they are made of fragments. The ideas of the filmmaker and the writer would have been too complex to be tackled by an overblown, operatic score; such a work could only scratch the surface of a few of their ideas without seeming disjointed. But Zorn's file card snippets bounce around like thoughts, overlapping and intruding on each other, reversing direction like a changed mind. Careful selection and arrangement make all the snippets seem essential and irreplaceable, despite their remarkable diversity. This album's execution is aided by a truly impressive cast of supporting musicians, whose close relationships with Zorn made it possible for the musical nuances to be communicated through interpersonal interaction. As a result, every piece sounds like a pure fragment of its genre instead of mere imitation".

In a review of a 1993 live performance of both compositions New York Times correspondent Peter Watrous stated "Although they seemed radical when they first appeared, they don't now: Mr. Zorn's practice is now part of the common vocabulary. The compositions just sound good, and it is easier with hindsight to see why the works radiate pleasure".

== Track listing ==
All compositions by John Zorn

1. "Godard" – 18:48
2. "Spillane" – 25:24
3. "Blues Noël" – 5:53

== Personnel ==
On "Godard"

- Anthony Coleman – piano, organ, harpsichord, celeste
- Carol Emanuel – harp
- Bill Frisell – guitars, banjo
- Christian Marclay – turntables
- Bobby Previte – drums, percussion
- David Weinstein – keyboards, computer
- John Zorn – alto saxophone, clarinet, French narration
- Luli Shioi – vocal
- Wu Shao-Ying – narration
- Richard Foreman – English narration
- Recorded at Radio City Studios, New York City in August–September 1985

On "Spillane"

- Anthony Coleman – piano, organ, celeste
- Carol Emanuel – harp
- Bill Frisell – guitar
- David Hofstra – bass, tuba
- Bob James – tapes, compact discs
- Bobby Previte – drums, percussion
- Jim Staley – trombone
- David Weinstein – sampling, keyboards
- John Zorn – alto saxophone, clarinet
- John Lurie – voice of Mike Hammer
- Robert Quine – voice of Mike Hammer's conscience
- Recorded at Radio City Studios, New York City in June–August 1986

On "Blues Noël"

- Michael Blair – percussion, voice
- Anthony Coleman – piano, organ, celeste, harpsichord
- Fred Frith – guitars, bass
- Ikue Mori – drum machine, voice
- David Weinstein – sampler
- John Zorn – alto saxophone
- Recorded at Radio City Studios, New York City in September 1987
