= Duras: Duchamp =

Studio album by John Zorn
- Released: August 19, 1997
- Recorded: April 1, 1997 at Shelley Palmer Studio, NYC; May 1, 1997 at Avatar, NYC
- Genre: Avant-garde, contemporary classical music
- Length: 47:23
- Label: Tzadik TZ 7023
- Producer: John Zorn

John Zorn chronology
Filmworks IV: S&M + More (1997)	Duras: Duchamp (1997)	Masada: Het (1997)

Duras: Duchamp is an album of contemporary classical music by American composer and saxophonist/multi-instrumentalist John Zorn consisting two tribute compositions for Marguerite Duras and Marcel Duchamp.

All tracks were recorded at Avatar on May 1, 1997, except for track 5, which was at Shelly Palmer Studio a month to the day prior.

== Reception ==
The Allmusic review by Stacia Proefrock awarded the album 4 stars and states that "This album shows that some of his best work can come when he is composing around a philosophical core instead of just playing with sound. If this is not one of his most complex classical pieces, it is at least one of his most beautiful in its embodiment of the spirit of the two honored artists".

Professional ratings
Review scores
Source	Rating
Allmusic	4/5 stars

== Track listing ==
All compositions by John Zorn.

1. "Duras: Premiere Livre" – 14:41
2. "Duras: Deuxième Livre" – 0:51
3. "Duras: Troisième Livre" – 16:46
4. "Duras: Epilogue" – 1:46
5. "Étant Donnés: 69 Paroxyms for Marcel Duchamp" – 13:17

== Personnel ==
- Christine Bard – percussion
- Anthony Coleman – piano
- Cenovia Cummins – violin
- Mark Feldman – violin
- Erik Friedlander – cello
- John Medeski – organ
- Jim Pugliese – percussion
- John Zorn – conductor
