= Filmworks VI: 1996 =

Soundtrack album by John Zorn
- Released: 1996
- Recorded: March 1 & 31, July 15, 1996
- Genre: avant-garde, jazz, classical
- Length: 75:49
- Label: Tzadik
- Producer: John Zorn

John Zorn chronology
Filmworks V: Tears of Ecstasy (1996)	Filmworks VI: 1996 (1996)	New Traditions in East Asian Bar Bands (1997)

Filmworks chronology
Filmworks V: Tears of Ecstasy (1996)	Filmworks VI: 1996 (1996)	Filmworks VII: Cynical Hysterie Hour (1989)

Filmworks VI: 1996 features three scores for film by John Zorn. The album was released on Zorn's own label, Tzadik Records, in 1996. It features the music that Zorn wrote and recorded for Anton, Mailman (1996), a short film directed by Dina Waxman that was never completed due to loss of funding in its final stages, Mechanics of the Brain (1996) directed by Henry Hills and The Black Glove (1996), which was directed by, and starred, Maria Beatty.

== Reception ==
The Allmusic review by Stacia Proefrock awarded the album 3 stars:

The three scores differed as much as the films for which they were intended. The tracks for Anton, Mailman are upbeat, swingy tunes that sound like they belong behind singing cowboys. The sections for the Henry Hills film are short, sharp, occasionally atmospheric, and definitely darker. And, perhaps most interestingly, instead of revisiting tired, old dungeon themes, the score for The Black Glove stepped even further into the realm of atmosphere by staying within only three sound reproductions: fire, water, and wind. The result is a soundtrack that evokes fear, discomfort, rest, and creepiness without rehashing the clichés of yore.

Professional ratings
Review scores
Source	Rating
Allmusic	3/5 stars

== Track listing ==
Anton, Mailman (1996, directed by Dina Waxman):
1/ Opening Credits/Hawaiian Postcard - 2:57
2/ Work-A-Day World (Anton's Theme) - 3:31
3/ Seductress - 4:18
4/ End Titles - 3:09

- Recorded at Baby Monster Studio, New York City on July 15, 1996
- Marc Ribot – guitar
- Greg Cohen – bass
- Cyro Baptista – percussion
- John Zorn – alto.

Mechanics Of The Brain (1996, directed by Henry Hills):
5/ Fireworks - 1:52
6/ Surgery Montage - 1:47
7/ Brain Scan - 1:05
8/ Witches' Cauldron - 3:47
9/ Houdini - 3:12
10/ Subliminal Perceptions - 1:45
11/ Measuring - 1:34
12/ MacBeth - 3:05
13/ Pendulum - 2:05
14/ Mechanics Of The Brain - 1:58

- Recorded at Shelley Palmer Studio, New York City on March 1, 1996
- Mark Feldman – violin
- Erik Friedlander – cello
- Marc Ribot – guitars
- Ikue Mori – drum machines
- John Zorn – sound effects
- Jason Baker (13) – voice

The Black Glove (1996, directed by Maria Beatty):
15/ Part One (Hot) - 19:47
16/ Part Two (Cold) - 7:44

- Recorded at Shelley Palmer Studio, New York City on March 31, 1996
- John Zorn – sound design.

All compositions by John Zorn

- Produced by John Zorn
