= The Abysmal Richness of the Infinite Proximity of the Same =

1998 studio album by Anthony Coleman

Studio album by Anthony Coleman's Selfhaters
- Released: 1998
- Recorded: February 13 and April 18, 1997 and February 16, 1998; The Studio and Avatar, NYC
- Genre: Jazz
- Length: 40:01
- Label: Tzadik TZ 7123
- Producer: Anthony Coleman

Anthony Coleman chronology
I Could've Been a Drum (1997)	The Abysmal Richness of the Infinite Proximity of the Same (1998)	Morenica (1998)

The Abysmal Richness of the Infinite Proximity of the Same is an album by keyboardist Anthony Coleman's Selfhaters which was released on the Tzadik label in 1998.

== Reception ==
Professional ratings
Review scores
Source	Rating
Allmusic	3/5 stars

In her review for Allmusic, Joslyn Layne notes that "The follow-up release to Anthony Coleman's Selfhaters, The Abysmal Richness of the Infinite Proximity of the Same finds the Selfhaters Orchestra realizing a music that yields a different experience with each listen... This release is less accessible than the first album (which was mostly live recordings), but is still rewarding".

== Track listing ==
All compositions by Anthony Coleman except as indicated

1. "The Abysmal Richness of the Infinite Proximity of the Same: Objectives 1-8" (Anthony Coleman, The Selfhaters) - 22:04
2. "His Masquerade" - 5:08
3. "Fifty-Seven Something" - 12:30

== Personnel ==
- Anthony Coleman - piano, organ, trombone, voice
- Doug Wieselman - E-flat clarinet, bass harmonica
- Michaël Attias - alto saxophone, baritone saxophone
- Fred Lonberg-Holm - cello
- Jim Pugliese - percussion
