= Our Beautiful Garden Is Open =

Our Beautiful Garden is Open

Studio album by Anthony Coleman's Sephardic Tinge
- Released: February 26, 2002
- Recorded: September 21, 2000 and October 22, 2001
- Genre: Jazz
- Length: 48:58
- Label: Tzadik TZ 7159
- Producer: Anthony Coleman

Anthony Coleman chronology
With Every Breath: The Music of Shabbat at BJ (1999)	Our Beautiful Garden is Open (2002)	Shmutsige Magnaten (2006)

Our Beautiful Garden is Open is an album by pianist Anthony Coleman's Sephardic Tinge which was released on the Tzadik label in 2002.

== Reception ==
Professional ratings
Review scores
Source	Rating
Allmusic	4.5/5 stars

In his review for Allmusic, Thom Jurek states "This is the best Sephardic Tinge disc yet".

== Track listing ==
All compositions by Anthony Coleman except as indicated

1. "Detritus" - 4:26
2. "Like Trees, Like Leaves ..." - 3:48
3. "El Sueno de la Hija del Rey" (Traditional Sephardic) - 4:10
4. "Et Dodim" (Traditional Sephardic) - 4:47
5. "Our Beautiful Garden is Open" - 9:12
6. "There is Nothing to Be Done" - 3:48
7. "Nani Nani" (Traditional Sephardic) - 4:17
8. "Youkali" (Kurt Weill, Roger Fernay) - 5:54
9. "Scalerica de Oro" (Traditional Sephardic) - 3:34
10. "Adon Haslichot" (Traditional Sephardic) - 5:00

== Personnel ==
- Anthony Coleman - piano
- Ben Street - bass
- Michael Sarin - drums
