= Sephardic Tinge =

Studio album by Anthony Coleman
- Released: 1995
- Recorded: December 8 & 29, 1993 and January 12, 1994, Kampo and Baby Monster, NYC
- Genre: Jazz
- Length: 48:49
- Label: Tzadik TZ 7102
- Producer: Anthony Coleman

Anthony Coleman chronology
Lobster and Friend (1993)	Sephardic Tinge (1995)	Selfhaters (1996)

Sephardic Tinge is an album by pianist Anthony Coleman which was released on the Tzadik label in 1995.

== Reception ==
Professional ratings
Review scores
Source	Rating
Allmusic	4.5/5 stars

In his review for Allmusic, Marc Gilman notes that "Sephardic Tinge is an excellent incorporation of traditional, ethnic music combined with an astute downtown New York sensibility".

== Track listing ==
All compositions by Anthony Coleman except as indicated

1. "Quando el Rey Nimrod" (Traditional) - 4:04
2. "Bye-Ya" (Thelonious Monk) - 5:14
3. "Ladino Passacaglia" - 5:10
4. "Belz" (Alexander Olshanetsky, Jacob Jacobs) - 4:56
5. "Bert Williams" (Jelly Roll Morton) - 4:08
6. "Sarajevo" - 4:20
7. "Doina" - 8:08
8. "Ask Anthony 2" (Coleman, Greg Cohen, Joey Baron) - 6:18
9. "Una Matica de Ruda" (Traditional) - 6:31

== Personnel ==
- Anthony Coleman - piano
- Greg Cohen - bass
- Joey Baron - drums
