= I Could've Been a Drum =

Studio album by Roy Nathanson and Anthony Coleman
- Released: March 18, 1997
- Recorded: 1996
- Studio: The Studio, New York City
- Genre: Jazz
- Length: 40:26
- Label: Tzadik TZ 7113
- Producer: Anthony Coleman, Roy Nathanson

Anthony Coleman chronology
Selfhaters (1996)	I Could've Been a Drum (1997)	The Abysmal Richness of the Infinite Proximity of the Same (1998)

I Could've Been a Drum is an album by the pianist Anthony Coleman and the saxophonist Roy Nathanson, released on the Tzadik label in 1997.

== Reception ==
Professional ratings
Review scores
Source	Rating
AllMusic	2.5/5 stars
The Penguin Guide to Jazz Recordings	3.5/4 stars

In his review for AllMusic, Marc Gilman notes that "this duet collaboration between Anthony Coleman and Roy Nathanson has its high points, but fails to produce music of the outstanding quality of Coleman's other projects".

== Track listing ==
All compositions by Anthony Coleman and Roy Nathanson except as indicated

1. "Ija Mia" (Traditional) – 2:56
2. "L' Amore" – 6:44
3. "Mr. Pig Gets a Balloon" (Roy Nathanson) – 2:39
4. "Rumle" – 3:37
5. "Devotional Song #1" – 6:42
6. "(If I Were a) Drum" (Anthony Coleman) – 2:52
7. "Soprano Ballad" – 3:27
8. "Ija Mia 2" (Traditional) – 3:23
9. "Ben" – 3:24
10. "Blues" – 4:42

== Personnel ==
- Anthony Coleman – piano, organ, sampler
- Roy Nathanson – saxophones, recorder
- Brad Jones – bass
- Marc Ribot – guitar

Technical

- John Zorn - executive producer
- Ray Dobbins - cover photographer
