= Shmutsige Magnaten =

Live album by Anthony Coleman
- Released: 21 February 2006
- Recorded: 1 July 2005, Kupa Synagogue, Krakow, Poland
- Genre: Jazz
- Length: 61:27
- Label: Tzadik TZ 8106
- Producer: Anthony Coleman

Anthony Coleman chronology
Our Beautiful Garden is Open (2002)	Shmutsige Magnaten (2006)	Pushy Blueness (2006)

Shmutsige Magnaten (subtitled Coleman Plays Gebirtig) is a live solo album by pianist Anthony Coleman performing the songs of Mordechai Gebirtig recorded in Poland and released on the Tzadik label in 2006.

== Reception ==
Professional ratings
Review scores
Source	Rating
Allmusic	4.5/5 stars

In his review for Allmusic, Thom Jurek states "Coleman is a master, and if you're at all interested either in Yiddish music or solo piano recordings that transcend jazz, blues, and other folk forms, let Shmutsige Magnaten be it".

== Track listing ==
All compositions by Mordechai Gebirtig except as indicated

1. "Mayn Yovl" – 5:00
2. "Mamenyu an Eytse" – 4:27
3. "Kartofl Zup mit Shvamen" – 8:30
4. "Avreml der Marvikher" – 8:54
5. "Oy Briderl, l'Chaim" – 7:33
6. "S'brent" – 6:00
7. "Hulyet, Hulyet, Kinderlekh" – 2:54
8. "S'Izs Gut" – 4:13
9. "Minuten Fun Betochen/Minuten Fun Yiesh" (Gebirtig, Coleman) – 5:46
10. "Oreme Shnayderlekh" – 8:15

== Personnel ==
- Anthony Coleman – piano, vocals
