= Filmworks VII: Cynical Hysterie Hour =

Soundtrack album by John Zorn
- Released: 1989
- Recorded: October, 1988 & January, 1989
- Genre: Animation music
- Length: 25:08
- Label: Tzadik
- Producer: John Zorn

John Zorn chronology
Spy vs Spy (1989)	Filmworks VII: Cynical Hysterie Hour (1989)	More News for Lulu (1992)

John Zorn Filmworks chronology
Filmworks VI: 1996 (1997)	Filmworks VII: Cynical Hysterie Hour (1989)	Filmworks VIII: 1997 (1998)

Filmworks VII: Cynical Hysterie Hour is a 1989 album by John Zorn featuring music written for a series of Japanese animated shorts that were created by Kiriko Kubo. It features Zorn's first music for cartoons and was originally released on the Japanese Sony label in limited numbers. In late 1996 Zorn finally attained the rights for his music and remastered and re-released the album on his own label, Tzadik, in 1997.

== Reception ==
The AllMusic review by Joclyn Layne stated: "Bursts of TV rock, synth whistles and barks, banjo licks, and sound effects intensify the caffeinated jumping through genre hoops of this slick and cinematically silly music".

Professional ratings
Review scores
Source	Rating
AllMusic	3/5 stars

== Track listing ==
No.	Title	Length
1.	"Hysteric Logo"	0:24
2.	"Walk to Park"	2:10
3.	"Coaster 2"	0:47
4.	"Fighting Pirates"	0:26
5.	"Yakisoba"	1:14
6.	"Coaster Trip"	1:39
7.	"1st Hit/2nd Hit"	0:27
8.	"Punk Rock Hero"	0:56
9.	"Abacus Waltz"	0:38
10.	"Punk Rebel/Tsunta's Theme"	3:36
11.	"End Title"	0:13
12.	"Through the Night"	1:30
13.	"Home Sweet Home"	1:43
14.	"Making Ramen at Midnight"	0:32
15.	"Scary Moonlight"	1:55
16.	"My Favorite Things"	2:18
17.	"Omelet Punk"	0:20
18.	"Classical"	0:16
19.	"Stink of an Onion"	0:34
20.	"Onion Samba"	0:59
21.	"Omelet Punk 2"	0:16
22.	"Me and My Hamburger/Final Samba"	1:05
23.	"Surfing Samba"	1:10

All compositions by John Zorn

== Personnel ==
- Tracks 1–6 recorded at Shelly Palmer Studio, New York City in October 1988
  - Bill Frisell - electric guitar, banjo
  - Carol Emanuel - harp
  - Wayne Horvitz - keyboards
  - Kermit Driscoll - acoustic & electric bass
  - Bobby Previte - drums, percussion
  - Cyro Baptista - Brazilian percussion
  - Christian Marclay - turntables
- Tracks 7–14 recorded at Shelly Palmer Studio, New York City in October 1988
  - Arto Lindsay - electric guitar
  - Robert Quine - electric guitar
  - Marc Ribot - electric guitar, banjo
  - Carol Emanuel - harp
  - Peter Scherer - keyboards
  - David Hofstra - acoustic & electric bass
  - Cyro Baptista - Brazilian percussion
  - Bobby Previte - drums, percussion
- Tracks 15–18 recorded at Shelly Palmer Studio, New York City in January 1989
  - Marc Ribot - acoustic & electric guitar, banjo
  - Carol Emanuel - harp
  - Jill Jaffee - violin, viola
  - Maxine Neuman - cello
  - Peter Scherer - keyboards
  - David Hofstra - acoustic & electric bass, tuba
  - Cyro Baptista - Brazilian percussion
  - Ikue Mori - drum machine
- Tracks 19–26 recorded at Shelly Palmer Studio, New York City in January 1989
  - Bill Frisell - electric & acoustic guitar, banjo
  - Robert Quine - electric guitar
  - Carol Emanuel - harp
  - Peter Scherer - keyboards
  - David Hofstra - electric & acoustic bass, tuba
  - Cyro Baptista - Brazilian percussion
  - Bobby Previte - drums, percussion
  - Arto Lindsay - vocal
  - Kiriko Kubo - vocal
