= Weird Little Boy =

Studio album by Weird Little Boy
- Released: 1998
- Recorded: November 26, 1995
- Genre: Noise, dark ambient, jazz
- Length: 41:49
- Label: Avant Avan 043
- Producer: John Zorn, Kazunori Sugiyama

John Zorn chronology
Filmworks VIII: 1997 (1998)	Weird Little Boy (1998)	The Circle Maker (1998)

Weird Little Boy is a one-off album by a band of the same name, performed by John Zorn (alto saxophone, keyboards, samplers), Trey Spruance (guitar, drums, keyboards), William Winant (percussion), Mike Patton (drums, vocals) and Chris Cochrane (guitar). It was released in 1998 on the Japanese label Avant.

Weird Little Boy is regarded by fans (as well as by the actual performers) as the best/worst thing that could have resulted from the meeting of this eclectic mix of artists. Every performer on the recording has at some point professed their distaste for the project. Most vocal on this subject was Trey Spruance.

== Reception ==
Professional ratings
Review scores
Source	Rating
Allmusic	3/5 stars

The Allmusic review by Bradley Torreano awarded the album 3 stars noting that "This is not for fans of jazz, or fans of anything really. This is a brutal noise experience for listeners interested in how far sonic technology can really be stretched and twisted. It is also very captivating music, and given time it can really sustain interest. Just make sure to listen to it when you have time to digest the whole package".

== Track listing ==
1. "Two Weeks on a Morphine Drip / New Dirt and New Flies / Lorne Greene" - 10:17
2. "If the Gun Has a Mind / Redeye / Worms and Shit" - 8:05
3. "Totally Poobied" - 2:14
4. "Weird Little Boy" - 1:39
5. "Lungfull of Water" - 7:51
6. "Seance" - 3:04
7. "When Blood Fills a Cylinder" - 2:59
8. "Waiting" - 1:46
9. "Blindness" - 4:04

Recorded at Creative Audio, New York City on November 26, 1995
All compositions by Weird Little Boy

== Personnel ==
- Chris Cochrane: guitar
- Mike Patton: drums, vocals
- Trey Spruance: guitars, keyboards, drums
- William Winant: percussion
- John Zorn: alto, samplers, keyboards
- Nayland Blake: graphics
- Dennis Cooper: text
