= Masada: Het =

Studio album by John Zorn
- Released: 1997
- Recorded: August 1, 1996 at Avatar, NYC
- Genre: Jazz
- Length: 60:17
- Label: DIW
- Producer: John Zorn and Kazunori Sugiyama

Masada chronology
| Masada: Zayin (1996) | Masada: Het (1997) | Masada: Tet (1997) |

John Zorn chronology
| Duras: Duchamp (1997) | Masada: Het (1997) | The Parachute Years (1997) |

Masada: Het, also known as ח or Masada 8, is a 1997 album by American composer and saxophonist John Zorn released on the Japanese DIW label. It is the eighth album of Masada recordings.

== Reception ==
The Allmusic review by Don Snowden awarded the album 4 stars stating "Het isn't spectacular Masada full of fireworks, but there's plenty of that around -- this is just a very good, solid disc packed with strong performances and material".

Professional ratings
Review scores
| Source | Rating |
|---|---|
| Allmusic | 4/5 stars |

== Track listing ==
All compositions by John Zorn.

1. "Shechem" - 11:25
2. "Elilah" - 4:38
3. "Kodashim" - 4:40
4. "Halom" - 2:00
5. "Ne'eman" - 9:56
6. "Abed-Nego" - 7:14
7. "Tohorot" - 4:39
8. "Mochin" - 6:37
9. "Amarim" - 4:28
10. "Khebar" - 4:40

== Personnel ==
- John Zorn — alto saxophone
- Dave Douglas — trumpet
- Greg Cohen — bass
- Joey Baron — drums
