= Filmworks V: Tears of Ecstasy =

Soundtrack album by John Zorn
- Released: 1996
- Recorded: October 1, 1995
- Studio: Shelley Palmer Studio, New York City
- Genre: avant-garde, jazz, classical
- Length: 57:08
- Label: Tzadik
- Producer: John Zorn

Filmworks chronology
| Filmworks IV: S&M + More (1997) | Filmworks V: Tears of Ecstasy (1996) | Filmworks VI: 1996 (1997) |

John Zorn chronology
| Masada: Zayin (1996) | Filmworks V: Tears of Ecstasy (1996) | Filmworks VI: 1996 (1996) |

Filmworks V: Tears of Ecstasy is a film score by John Zorn. The album was released on Zorn's own label, Tzadik Records, in 1996. It features the music that Zorn wrote and recorded for the movie Tears of Ecstasy (1995) by director Oki Hiroyuki.

== Reception ==
The Allmusic review by Joslyn Layne awarded the album 3 stars noting that "There are small instances of theme recurrence throughout the album, but Film Works, Vol. 5 is mostly an entertaining musical ride".

Professional ratings
Review scores
| Source | Rating |
|---|---|
| Allmusic | 3/5 stars |

== Track listing ==
All compositions by John Zorn

1. "Factor" - 1:02
2. "Intercept" - 1:13
3. "Lemma" - 1:18
4. "Root" - 1:06
5. "Net" - 1:19
6. "Lie Group" - 1:10
7. "Reduction" - 1:03
8. "Trisectrix of MacLaurin" - 1:07
9. "Interpolation" - 1:09
10. "Gradients" - 1:16
11. "Random Walk" - 1:27
12. "Cusp" - 1:04
13. "Region" - 1:07
14. "Block" - 1:09
15. "Prediction" - 1:09
16. "Concordance" - 1:13
17. "Modulus" - 1:01
18. "Addition" - 1:08
19. "Ergodicity" - 1:24
20. "Prism" - 1:15
21. "Mean Difference" - 2:13
22. "Likelihood" - 1:18
23. "Deviation" - 1:02
24. "Curl" - 1:12
25. "Probable Error" - 1:24
26. "Limit" - 1:09
27. "Youden Square" - 1:19
28. "Tensor" - 1:06
29. "Martingale" - 1:05
30. "Tantochrone" - 1:07
31. "Witch of Agnesi" - 1:14
32. "Rank" - 0:58
33. "Quadrature" - 1:03
34. "Discriminant" - 1:23
35. "Rose Curve" - 1:07
36. "Lituus" - 1:04
37. "Involute" - 1:06
38. "Catearies" - 1:12
39. "Folium" - 1:20
40. "Edge Train" - 1:16
41. "Ruled Surface" - 1:14
42. "Slope" - 1:03
43. "Cluster" - 1:06
44. "Spiral" - 1:16
45. "Octal" - 1:07
46. "Cissoid of Diocles" - 1:15
47. "Arc" - 1:26
48. "Pole" - 1:21
- Recorded at Shelley Palmer Studio, New York City on October 1, 1995

== Personnel ==
- Robert Quine – guitar
- Marc Ribot – guitar
- Cyro Baptista – percussion
- John Zorn – alto saxophone, prepared piano, samples
- Jason Baker – vocal
