= Pushy Blueness =

Studio album by Anthony Coleman
- Released: August 22, 2006
- Recorded: 2006
- Genre: Jazz
- Length: 41:55
- Label: Tzadik TZ 8024
- Producer: Anthony Coleman

Anthony Coleman chronology
Shmutsige Magnaten (2006)	Pushy Blueness (2006)	Lapidation (2007)

Pushy Blueness is an album by pianist Anthony Coleman which was released on the Tzadik label in 2006.

== Reception ==
Professional ratings
Review scores
Source	Rating
Allmusic	4/5 stars

In his review for Allmusic, arwulf arwulf states "Anthony Coleman's Pushy Blueness was released in 2006 on John Zorn's Tzadik label, and should endure as a well-balanced sampling of his creative output during that period".

== Track listing ==
All compositions by Anthony Coleman

1. "Township Jive" – 5:25
2. "Set Into Motion" – 12:06
3. "The Hidden Agenda" – 8:38
4. "Pushy Blueness" – 15:45

== Personnel ==
- Anthony Coleman – piano, organ, mbira, khene, composer
- Doug Wieselman – E-flat clarinet, bass clarinet, electric guitar (tracks 1 & 4)
- Marco Cappelli – guitar (track 4)
- Joseph Kubera – piano (track 3)
- Jim Pugliese – percussion (tracks 1 & 4)

Track 2 performed by The Tilt Brass Band

- C.J. Camerieri, Charlie Porter, Taylor Haskins – trumpet
- Chris McIntyre, Joe Fiedler – trombone
- Jacob Garchik – bass trombone
- Ann Ellsworth, John Clark – French horn
- Ron Caswell – tuba
- Kevin Norton – percussion
- Greg Evans – conductor
