= Masada: Zayin =

Studio album by John Zorn
- Released: 1996
- Recorded: April 16, 1996
- Genre: Jazz
- Length: 60:43
- Label: DIW
- Producer: John Zorn and Kazunori Sugiyama

Masada chronology
| Masada: Vav (1995) | Masada: Zayin (1996) | Masada: Het (1997) |

John Zorn chronology
| In Memory of Nikki Arane (1996) | Masada: Zayin (1996) | Filmworks V: Tears of Ecstasy (1996) |

Masada: Zayin, also known as ז or Masada 7, is a 1996 album by American composer and saxophonist John Zorn and released on the Japanese DIW label. It is the seventh album of Masada recordings.

== Reception ==
The Allmusic review by Don Snowden awarded the album 3 stars stating "Masada's seventh volume sounds almost like an odds-and-sods collection. It's a more fragmentary and disparate disc that doesn't have much musical middle ground -- the extremes between the group's atonal free improv bursts and its more melodic or atmospheric pieces are very pronounced... The music flies all over the map and it sounds like Masada is just wrapping up loose ends or spewing out material based on Zorn's concepts that could have stayed out in the woodshed. Although it's good to hear the group taking some different roads, this is a minor entry in its catalog".

Professional ratings
Review scores
| Source | Rating |
|---|---|
| Allmusic | 3/5 stars |

== Track listing ==
All compositions by John Zorn.

1. "Shevet" – 7:58
2. "Hath-Arob" – 3:24
3. "Mahshav" – 6:16
4. "Shamor" – 5:09
5. "Bacharach" – 1:24
6. "Otiot" – 3:27
7. "Nevuah" – 8:22
8. "Kedem" – 9:55
9. "Zemer" – 2:14
10. "Evel" – 5:35
11. "Tekufah" – 6:59

- Recorded at the Power Station, New York City on April 16, 1996

== Personnel ==
- John Zorn – alto saxophone
- Dave Douglas – trumpet
- Greg Cohen – bass
- Joey Baron – drums
