= Lapidation (album) =

Studio album by Anthony Coleman
- Released: December 2007
- Recorded: 2007
- Genre: Jazz, contemporary classical music
- Length: 61:27
- Label: New World 80593
- Producer: Judith Sherman

Anthony Coleman chronology
Pushy Blueness (2006)	Lapidation (2007)	Freakish (2009)

Lapidation is an album by composer and keyboardist Anthony Coleman performed by a various lineups from large ensembles to solo pianists and released on the New World label in 2007.

== Reception ==
Professional ratings
Review scores
Source	Rating
Allmusic	4/5 stars

In his review for Allmusic, Blair Sanderson states "Angular lines, piercing sonorities, and abrupt changes of mood characterize Coleman's sharply defined music, and its edginess makes this album best suited for adventurous listeners".

== Track listing ==
All compositions by Anthony Coleman

1. "Lapidation" – 10:33
2. "East Orange" – 2:33
3. "I Diet on Cod" – 12:36
4. "Mise en Abîme" – 13:22
5. "The King of Kabay" – 10:54

== Personnel ==
- Anthony Coleman – organ, conductor
- Marty Ehrlich – tenor saxophone, clarinet
- Ashley Paul, Chris Veilleux – alto saxophone
- Doug Wieselman – clarinet, bass clarinet, E-flat clarinet
- Ned Rothenberg – clarinet, bass clarinet
- Dana Jessen – bassoon
- Dan Barrett – cello
- Gareth Flowers – trumpet
- Christopher McIntyre, Jacob Garchik, Matt Plummer – trombone
- Steven Gosling, Joseph Kubera, Christopher McDonald – piano
- Cornelius Dufallo – violin
- Marco Cappelli – guitar, electric guitar, mandolin
- Jameson Swanagon – electric guitar
- Ben Davis, Ken Filiano, Sean Conly – bass
- Cory Pesaturo, Ted Reichman – accordion
- Jim Pugliese, Kevin Norton – percussion
- Eli Keszler – drums
