= Morenica (album) =

Studio album by Anthony Coleman's Sephardic Tinge
- Released: October 20, 1998
- Recorded: 1998
- Genre: Jazz
- Length: 48:24
- Label: Tzadik TZ 7128
- Producer: Anthony Coleman

Anthony Coleman chronology
The Abysmal Richness of the Infinite Proximity of the Same (1998)	Morenica (1998)	With Every Breath: The Music of Shabbat at BJ (1999)

Morenica is an album by pianist Anthony Coleman's Sephardic Tinge which was released on the Tzadik label in 1998.

== Reception ==
Professional ratings
Review scores
Source	Rating
Allmusic	4/5 stars

In his review for Allmusic, David Freedlander states "this album further establishes Coleman as one of Downtown's most accomplished pianists and intelligent composers".

== Track listing ==
All compositions by Anthony Coleman except as indicated

1. "La Cantiga del Fuego" (Traditional) - 3:55
2. "She's Doing It Again" - 2:43
3. "He Would Turn in His Grave" - 5:14
4. "Yaëlica" - 7:41
5. "Addio Querida" (Traditional) - 6:03
6. "Ghetto (Ich Bin Ein Marrano)" - 2:30
7. "Terpsichore" (Herbie Nichols) - 5:29
8. "Selo Moje" - 3:41
9. "Berechit" - 4:21
10. "Morenica" (Traditional) - 6:47

== Personnel ==
- Anthony Coleman - piano, voice
- Ben Street - bass
- Michael Sarin - drums
