= Clocktower Productions =

US non-profit art institution

Coordinates: 40.71669°N 74.00431°W

Clocktower Productions is a non-profit art institution working in the visual arts, performance, music, and radio. It was founded in 1972 as The Clocktower Gallery by Alanna Heiss, the Founder and former Director of MoMA PS1 (formerly P.S.1 Contemporary Art Center) under the aegis of the Institute for Art and Urban Resources. From 1972 until 2013, the institution operated out of a building at 346 Broadway, between Catherine Lane and Leonard Street, owned by the New York City government in Tribeca, Manhattan.

In 2013, the City of New York sold 346 Broadway to a private developer, and the organization relocated its operations through program partnerships with other arts institutions around the city, including Pioneer Works in Red Hook, Brooklyn, Knockdown Center in Queens, and Times Square Arts, among others.

== History ==
Clocktower Productions is the organization formerly known as The Clocktower Gallery and ARTonAIR.org. Opening in 1972 with inaugural shows. The Clocktower presented work in the visual arts, performance, and music by artists including Gordon Matta-Clark and Dennis Oppenheim

After September 11, 2001, security procedures in the organization’s City-owned building suspended ongoing activity and exhibitions in the Clocktower. From 2004 until 2008, the Clocktower space operated, under the direction of David Weinstein, as a satellite of P.S.1 Contemporary Art Center (now MoMA PS1), housing the headquarters of Art Radio WPS1.org, the museum’s all-art Web-based radio station.

In December 2008, Alanna Heiss left P.S.1 and returned to the Clocktower Gallery in order to run the radio station full-time, renaming the organization AIR, Art International Radio.

From 2009 until 2013, the Clocktower Gallery produced exhibitions, residencies, and performances by artists including James Franco ,

In December 2013, after the sale of the Clocktower Gallery building to a private developer, the organization relocated its offices and activities through a network of program partnerships with other institutions around the city: Pioneer Works in Red Hook, Knockdown Center and Playland Motel in Queens, Times Square Arts, Jones Day, and Red Bull Studios in Manhattan.

== Clocktower Radio ==
The online radio station of Clocktower Productions was founded in 2004 as WPS1.org. In 2009, it was renamed AIR (Art International Radio) after Director Alanna Heiss left P.S.1, and David Weintstein took over as Program Director, and in 2014 it was renamed again after Clocktower’s relocation from its City building.

The collected online archives at clocktower.org contain over 7,000 programs of interviews, DJ sets, concert recordings, and music surveys covering literary figures, contemporary music, restored historic broadcasts, and artist profiles.
