= Roy Nathanson =

American saxophonist (born 1951)

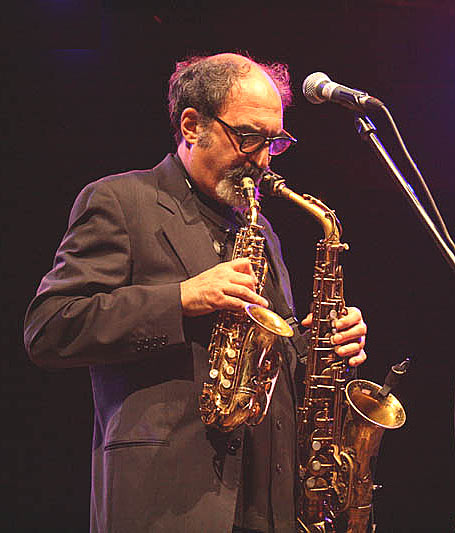

Background information
- Genre: Jazz
- Occupations: Musician, Composer, Bandleader, Teacher
- Instruments: Saxophone, Vocals
- Labels: Tzadik Records, Six Degrees Records, Aum Fidelity, Les Disques Du Crepuscule, Windham Hill Records, Tablehead, Knitting Factory Works, 32 Jazz

Roy Jay Nathanson (born May 17, 1951) is an American saxophonist, composer, bandleader, and teacher. He became the leader and principal composer of the Jazz Passengers, a six piece group that he founded with Curtis Fowlkes in 1987. They have toured Europe many times and played at major festivals in Finland, Germany, Italy, France and Switzerland, as well as the J.V.C. Festival in New York, the Du Maurier Festival in Canada and toured throughout the United States and Canada. The band has recorded eight albums since their debut release.

== Life and work ==
Roy Nathanson was born to a Jewish family in Brooklyn, New York. He grew up in Ditmas Park, Brooklyn

In 1994, Nathanson composed a variety of songs for an original vocal album, Jazz Passengers in Love, produced by Hal Willner and Hugo Dwyer. A number of guest vocalists were featured, including Jimmy Scoff, John Kelly, Freedy Johnston, Bernard Fowler, Jeff Buckley and Deborah Harry, who is now functioning as a full-time member of the band. Since the summer of 1995 The Jazz Passengers, have toured Europe and America with Harry, and an occasional guest appearance by Elvis Costello. With this configuration, the Passengers have released two albums. Individually Twisted (with Harry and Costello), and Live In Spain featuring Deborah Harry. The band performed orchestral arrangements of their repertoire with Harry and the Buffalo Philharmonic Orchestra in March 2001.

Nathanson also co-leads a duo with keyboardist, composer Anthony Coleman, with whom he has also toured the U.S. and Europe. Their third album, I Could've Been a Drum was released on John Zorn's Tzadik Records label.

As an independent composer, he has scored the work of monologuist David Cale. Their work, Deep in a Dream of You, premiered at Chicago's Goodman Theatre in 1990 and had its New York premiere at the Knitting Factory in 1992, later appearing at the Joseph Papp Public Theater in April 1993. This was their third collaboration. He has scored several works for PBS, and films by Jacob Burkhardt and Tamara Jenkins as well as numerous theater productions for playwright Ray Dobbins and others. He has written children's songs for the HBO series Happily Ever After: Fairy Tales for Every Child. Several of his songs will be featured in Karole Armitage's adaptation of Sheherazade at the Florence Opera House, and songs that he has written or arranged have appeared in Robert Altman's film Short Cuts and Chantal Akerman's Histoires d'Amérique. He scored the animated film Jay Street directed by Suzan Pitt which premiered at the New York Film Festival in October 1995. A film scene album of his Klezmer- based scene for the 1997 feature film Camp Stories featuring MIN Gould and Jerry Stiller was released on Knitting Factory Works.

In 1997 he arranged a Serge Gainsbourg song for the Jazz Passengers and Deborah Harry for a Virgin France compilation, and set a poem by Edgar Allan Poe which was released on a Poe compilation produced by Hal Willner.

Nathanson received two grants from the Meet the Composer organization funded by the Carnegie Corporation in 1996 and 1997 to create new work with children. The result, Dreams of Someday was co-written by the children of P.S. 188 in Queens, and performed by their chorus and band trained by Nathanson. It was also performed as part of the Texaco Jazz Festival in June 1997.

The Fire at Keaton's Bar & Grill, was Nathanson's CD released under his own name by Six Degrees Records in March 2000. It is a story of a fire in a mythical bar and features performances by many of the collaborators he has worked with in his career, adding Charles Earland to Elvis Costello and Debbie Harry. It has been performed at Arts at St. Ann's Warehouse in New York City and at the Royal Festival Hall in London.

As an actor, he has performed in films by Chantal Akerman, Jim Jarmusch and Elaine May, as well as a variety of downtown N.Y. theatre projects. He was featured in a starring role in the children's film Wasserman directed by Peter Lilienthal.

He was also featured prominently in a digital/web content series called 'Troubadours', created by Douglas Sloan (filmmaker). The series profiles artists with unconventional approaches to story telling through music.

His sideman credits include four years recording and touring with The Lounge Lizards, work with Marc Ribot's Rootless Cosmopolitans, Charles Earland and The Shirelles. He has also performed in special projects including a recent saxophone quartet concert in Brussels with Steve Lacy and Ned Rothenberg in which each of the four musicians contributed an original composition.

He currently resides in Ditmas Park, Brooklyn, with his wife and son. He also teaches at the Institute for Collaborative Education, a public school in Lower Manhattan, with which he has organised several overseas concerts including one in Newcastle upon Tyne in March 2011, as well as organizing several bands, both middle school and high school.

== Discography ==
- Little Fred (Les Disques du Crepuscule, 1990)
- The Coming Great Millennium... (Knitting Factory Works, 1992) with Anthony Coleman
- Lobster and Friend (Knitting Factory, 1993) with Anthony Coleman
- Camp Stories: Music from the Motion Picture (Knitting Factory Works, 1996)
- I Could've Been a Drum (Tzadik, 1997) with Anthony Coleman
- Fire at Keaton's Bar and Grill (Six Degrees, 2000)
- Sotto Voce (Aum Fidelity, 2006)
- Subway Moon (Yellowbird, 2009)
- Complicated Day (Yellowbird, 2014)
- Nearness and You (Clean Feed, 2016)
- Small Things (NYXO, 2021) - co-led with Nick Hakim

=== With The Jazz Passengers ===
- Broken Night/Red Light (Les Disques du Crepuscule - 1987)
- Deranged & Decomposed (Les Disques du Crepuscule - 1989)
- Implement Yourself (New World, 1990)
- Live at the Knitting Factory (Knitting Factory, 1991)
- Plain Old Joe (Knitting Factory Works, 1993)
- In Love (High Street, 1994)
- Individually Twisted (32 Jazz, 1996)
- "Live" in Spain (32 Jazz, 1997)

With The Lounge Lizards

- Live in Tokyo - Big Heart (Island Records, 1986)
- No Pain For Cakes (Island Records, 1987)
- Voice of Chunk (Lagarto Productions, 1988)

With Marc Ribot

- Rootless Cosmopolitans (Island, 1990)
- Requiem for What's His Name (Les Disques du Crépuscule, 1992)
- Shoe String Symphonettes (Tzadik, 1997)

== Filmography ==
- Looking For Ornette (La Huit / Mezzo, 2016)

== Poetry books ==
- subway moon (buddy's knife jazzedition, 2009)
