= Ganryu Island (album) =

1985 studio album by Michihiro Sato and John Zorn

Studio album by Michihiro Sato and John Zorn
- Released: 1985; 1998 (re-release)
- Recorded: Radio City Studio on November 23, 1984
- Genre: Avant-garde
- Length: 75:24
- Label: Yukon; Tzadik (re-release)
- Producer: John Zorn

John Zorn chronology
The Classic Guide to Strategy (1983)	Ganryu Island (00000001)	Voodoo (1986)

Ganryu Island is a collaborative album by John Zorn and Michihiro Sato. The album was first released on vinyl LP on Yukon Records in 1984 and later re-released on Tzadik Records as a CD with five additional tracks in 1998.

The album is titled after Ganryujima, a small island in the Strait of Shimonoseki where legendary samurai warriors Miyamoto Musashi and Sasaki Kojiro engaged in battle.

== Reception ==
Professional ratings
Review scores
Source	Rating
AllMusic	4/5 stars
The Penguin Guide to Jazz	3/4 stars

The AllMusic review by Joslyn Layne stated: "The great, no-holds-barred improvisation is by no means an inchoate whirl -- indeed, the shamisen's rhythmic presence often provides a steady, but flexible structure for the duo's truly imaginative interaction".

The Penguin Guide to Jazz observed that "listening to Ganryu Island is like panning for gold: seeming eternities spent lodging through muddy dross in order to turn up a few moments of pure gold. By the oddest perversity, the very best tracks seem to be those which were excluded from the venial release".

== Track listing ==
All compositions by John Zorn and Satoh Michihiro

No.	Title	Length
1.	"Ryukyu Heishi"	6:12
2.	"Haguregumo"	14:14
3.	"Two Ronin"	3:53
4.	"Kagemusha"	10:37
5.	"Odori Dayu"	5:31
6.	"Ganryu Island"	11:11
7.	"Yoshiwara Kaidan"	3:27
8.	"Natsu Matsuri"	5:31
9.	"Giri"	5:29
10.	"Yonaka No Hatashiai"	2:07
11.	"Uma No Koku"	2:39
12.	"Tsugaru Bushido"	4:33

== Personnel ==
- John Zorn - alto and soprano saxophones, Bb clarinet, game calls, E-flat clarinet
- Sato Michihiro - shamisen
