= Ned Rothenberg =

American musician and composer

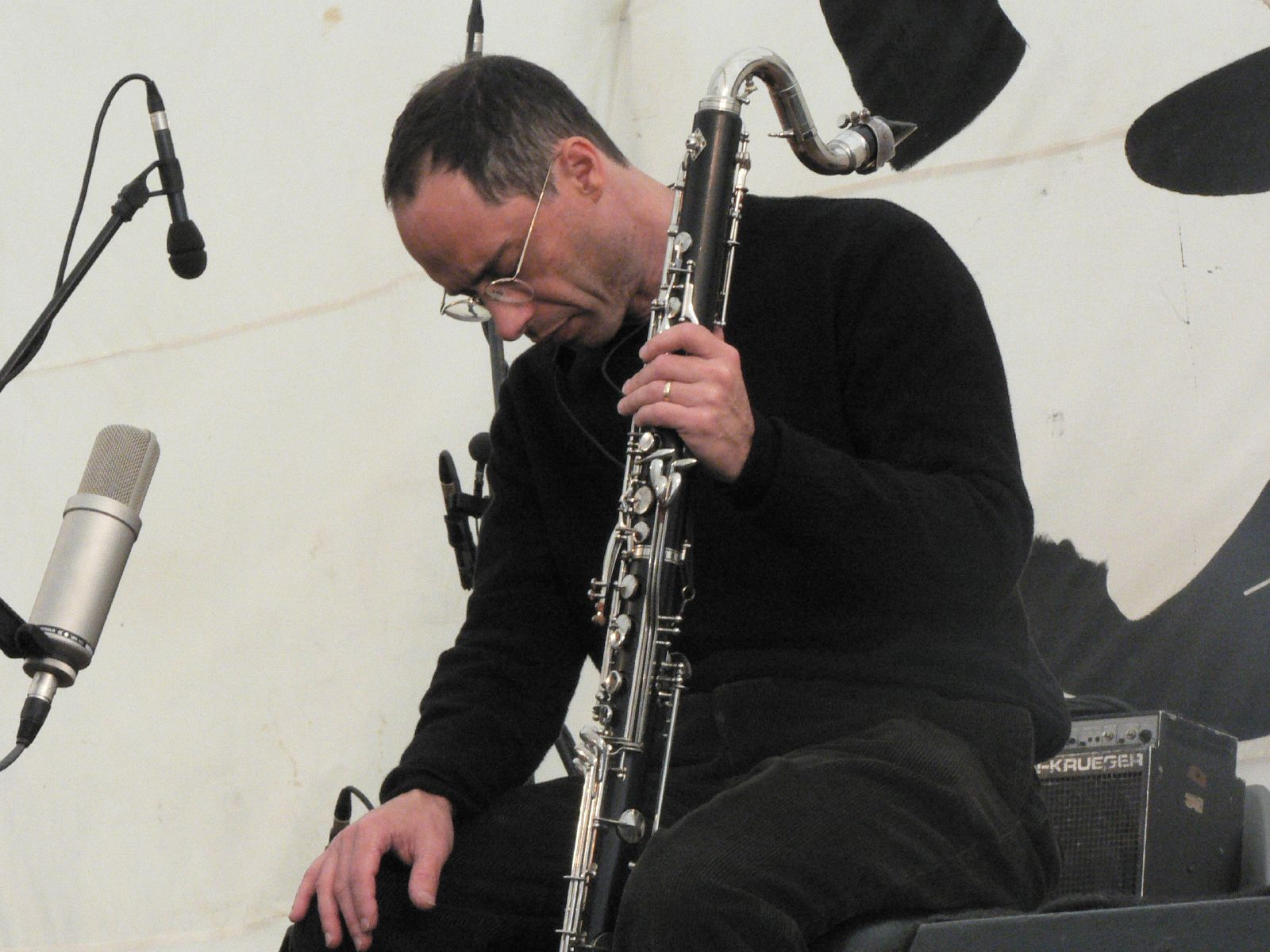

Background information
- Born: September 15, 1956 (age 69); Boston, Massachusetts, U.S.
- Genres: Avant-garde jazz, free jazz, free improvisation, contemporary classical
- Occupation: Musician
- Instrument: Woodwinds
- Years active: 1970s–present
- Labels: New World, Tzadik
- Website: nedrothenberg.com

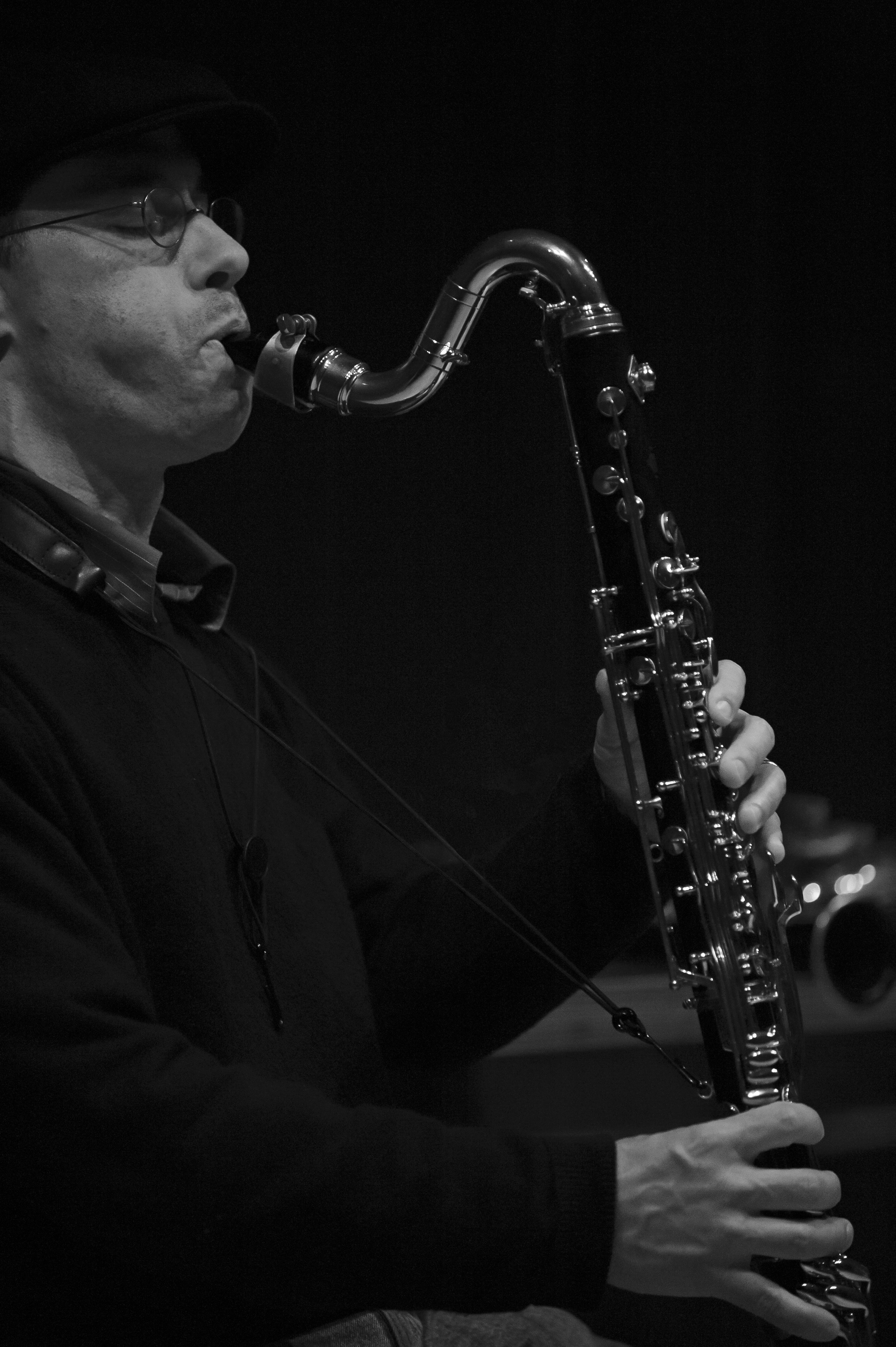
Ned Rothenberg Buffalo, New York

Ned Rothenberg (born September 15, 1956) is an American multi-instrumentalist and composer. He specializes in woodwind instruments, including the alto saxophone, clarinet, bass clarinet, flute, and shakuhachi (Japanese bamboo flute). He is known for his work in contemporary classical and free improvisation. Rothenberg is a graduate of the Oberlin Conservatory of Music. He was a founding member of the woodwind trio New Winds with J. D. Parran and Robert Dick. He has performed with Samm Bennett, Paul Dresher, Fred Frith, Evan Parker, Marc Ribot, Elliott Sharp, John Zorn, Yuji Takahashi, Sainkho Namtchylak, and Katsuya Yokoyama.

== Discography ==
=== As leader ===
- Trials of the Argo (Lumina, 1981)
- Portal (Lumina, 1983)
- Trespass (Lumina, 1986)
- Overlays (Moers, 1991)
- Opposites Attract with Paul Dresher (New World, 1991)
- Power Lines (New World, 1995)
- Real and Imagined Time (Moers, 1995)
- Amulet with Sainkho (Leo, 1996)
- Monkey Puzzle with Evan Parker (Leo, 1997)
- Port of Entry (Intuition, 1998)
- Ghost Stories (Tzadik, 2000)
- Tools of The Trade with Denman Maroney, (CIMP, 2001)
- Intervals (Animul, 2002)
- Decisive Action with Satoh Masahiko (BAJ, 2004)
- En Passant with Peter A. Schmid (Creative Works, 2004)
- Harbinger (Animul, 2004)
- Falling into Place with Slava Ganelin (Auris Media, 2006)
- El Nino with Matthias Ziegler, Peter A. Schmid (Creative Works, 2006)
- Live at Roulette with Evan Parker (Animul, 2007)
- The Fell Clutch with Tony Buck, Stomu Takeishi (Animul, 2007)
- Inner Diaspora (Tzadik, 2007)
- While You Were Out with Catherine Jauniaux, Barre Phillips (Kadima Collective, 2009)
- Free Zone Appleby 2007 with Evan Parker, Paolo Angeli (psi, 2009)
- Live at DOM with Vladimir Volkov (Dom, 2010)
- Quintet for Clarinet and Strings (Tzadik, 2010)
- Ryu Nashi/No School-New Music for Shakuhachi (Tzadik, 2010)
- World of Odd Harmonics (Tzadik, 2012)
- In Cahoots with Mark Feldman, Sylvie Courvoisier, (Clean Feed, 2016)
- Strings 2 with Perelman/Maneri/Roberts (Leo, 2018)

With New Winds

- The Cliff (Sound Aspects, 1989)
- Traction (Sound Aspects, 1991)
- Digging It Harder from Afar (Les Disques Victo, 1995)
- Potion (Les Disques Victo, 1998)

With Semantics

- Semantics (Review, 1986)
- Bone of Contention (SST, 1987)

=== As sideman ===
With Anthony Braxton

- Creative Orchestra (Köln) 1978 (hatART, 1995)
- Trillium R (Braxton House, 1999)
- Orchestra (Paris) 1978 (Braxton Bootleg, 2011)

With Robert Dick

- Venturi Shadows (OODiscs, 1991)
- Worlds of If (Leo, 1995)

With Kip Hanrahan

- Desire Develops an Edge (American Clave, 1983)
- Vertical's Currency (American Clave, 1985)

With Denman Maroney

- Fluxations (New World, 2003)
- Gaga (Nuscope, 2008)
- Udentity (Clean Feed, 2009)

With Steve Nieve

- Mumu (Silvertone, 2001)
- Welcome to the Voice (Deutsche Grammophon, 2007)

With Evan Parker

- The Moment's Energy (ECM, 2009)
- Hasselt (psi, 2012)
- Seven ElectroAcoustic Septet (Les Disques Victo, 2014)

With Marc Ribot

- Music from the Performance Inasmuch As Life Is Borrowed (Ultima Vez, 2001)
- Scelsi Morning (Tzadik, 2003)
- Soundtracks Volume 2 (Tzadik, 2003)

With Adam Rudolph

- Dream Garden (Justin Time, 2008)
- Can You Imagine...The Sound of a Dream (Meta, 2011)

With Steve Swell

- Flurries Warm and Clear (CIMP, 2000)
- Kanreki: Reflection & Renewal (Not Two, 2015)

With John Zorn

- The Big Gundown (Nonesuch, 1986)
- Music Romance Volume III: The Gift (Tzadik, 2001)
- Dictée/Liber Novus (Tzadik, 2010)

With others

- Anthony Coleman, Lapidation (New World, 2008)
- Samm Bennett, The Big Off (Factory Outlet, 1993)
- Elvis Costello, The Juliet Letters (Rhino, 2006)
- Marty Ehrlich, The Long View (Enja, 2002)
- Nicolas Collins, 100 of The World's Most Beautiful Melodies (Trace Elements, 1989)
- Heiner Goebbels, Heiner Mueller, Der Mann Im Fahrstuhl (ECM, 1988)
- Phil Haynes Herb Robertson 5tet, Brooklyn-Berlin (CIMP, 2000)
- Jason Hwang, Unfolding Stone (Sound Aspects, 1990)
- Sato Michihiro, Rodan (hat ART, 1989)
- Marisa Monte, Green, Blue, Yellow, Rose and Charcoal (Metro Blue, 1994)
- Sainkho Namtchylak, Stepmother City (Ponderosa Music & Art, 2000)
- Roy Nathanson, Fire at Keaton's Bar & Grill (Six Degrees, 2000)
- Bob Ostertag, Bob Ostertag Plays the Serge 1978–1983 (Analogue Motions Studio, 2014)
- Bobby Previte, The 23 Constellations of Joan Miro (Tzadik, 2001)
- Liu Sola, Blues in the East (Axiom, 1994)
- Elliott Sharp, Radiolaria (Zoar, 2001)
- Daniel Zamir, Children of Israel (Tzadik, 2002)
