= Filmworks VIII: 1997 =

Soundtrack album by John Zorn
- Released: 1998
- Recorded: July 22 & November 9, 1997
- Genres: avant-garde, jazz, classical
- Length: 65:08
- Label: Tzadik TZ 7318
- Producer: John Zorn

Filmworks chronology
Filmworks VII: Cynical Hysterie Hour (1989)	Filmworks VIII: 1997 (1998)	Filmworks IX: Trembling Before G-d (2000)

John Zorn chronology
Masada: Tet (1998)	Filmworks VIII: 1997 (1998)	Weird Little Boy (1998)

Filmworks VIII: 1997 features two scores for film by John Zorn released on Zorn's own label, Tzadik Records, in 1998. It features the music that Zorn wrote and recorded for The Port of Last Resort (1998), a documentary directed by Joan Grossman and Paul Rosdy examining the experiences of Jewish refugees in Shanghai and Latin Boys Go to Hell (1997) which was directed by Ela Troyano.

The tracks for Port of Last Resort are performed by the Masada String Trio with the addition of Min Xiao-Fen (pipa), Marc Ribot (guitar) and Anthony Coleman (piano). Tracks for Latin Boys Go to Hell feature the percussion of Cyro Baptista and Kenny Wollesen.

== Reception ==
Professional ratings
Review scores
Source	Rating
Allmusic	4.5/5 stars

The Allmusic review by Joslyn Layne awarded the album 4½ stars noting that "The sophisticated music of Film Works 8 stands apart for its cosmopolitan assuredness, high level of musicianship, and beauty".

== Track listing ==
- The Port Of Last Resort (1998) directed by Joan Grossman and Paul Rosdy.

1. "Teqiah" - 3:07
2. "Shanghai" - 2:35
3. "Emunim" - 3:32
4. "Ruan (guitar version)" - 4:37
5. "Ebionim" - 3:00
6. "Ahavah" - 3:42
7. "Ruan (pipa version)" - 3:37
8. "Livant" - 1:54
9. "Or Ne'erav" - 6:58
10. "Shanim" - 2:03
11. "Ruan (solo piano)" - 3:42

- Recorded at Avatar Studio, New York City on November 9, 1997
- Mark Feldman – violin
- Marc Ribot – guitars
- Erik Friedlander – cello
- Min Xiao-Fen – pipa
- Greg Cohen – bass
- Anthony Coleman – piano
- Latin Boys Go To Hell (1997) directed by Ela Troyano

12. "Deseo" - 2:28
13. "Mentiras" - 2:15
14. "Ansiedad" - 2:55
15. "Locura" - 2:47
16. "Sangre" - 1:02
17. "Olvido" - 2:21
18. "Engano" - 2:25
19. "Traicion" - 2:25
20. "Ilusion" - 2:43
21. "Lagrimas" - 4:14

- Recorded at Creative Audio, New York City on July 22, 1997
- Cyro Baptista – percussion
- Kenny Wollesen – drums, vibraphone, percussion

All compositions by John Zorn
