= Voodoo (Sonny Clark Memorial Quartet album) =

Studio album by The Sonny Clark Memorial Quartet
- Released: 1986
- Recorded: November 25 and 26, 1985
- Genre: Hard bop
- Length: 43:01
- Label: Black Saint
- Producer: Giovanni Bonandrini

John Zorn chronology
| Ganryu Island (1985) | Voodoo (1986) | The Big Gundown (1986) |

Voodoo is an album by The Sonny Clark Memorial Quartet, which comprised alto saxophonist John Zorn, keyboardist Wayne Horvitz, bassist Ray Drummond and drummer Bobby Previte. The album was released in 1986 on Black Saint Records and featured the group’s arrangements of compositions by hard bop pianist Sonny Clark.

== Reception ==
The Allmusic review by Scott Yanow awarded the album 4½ stars, stating "This unusual album is an unlikely success... Zorn creates fairly boppish solos with occasional hints at more advanced improvising techniques. Worth checking out".

The Rolling Stone review by Steve Futterman said that the album "brings out Zorn's anarchic tendencies... Quartet masterminds Zorn and Wayne Horvitz spit fire, never allowing this heartfelt tribute to get too reverential... Here Zorn sounds like he's having serious fun".

Professional ratings
Review scores
| Source | Rating |
|---|---|
| Allmusic | 4.5/5 stars |

== Track listing ==
| No. | Title | Length |
|---|---|---|
| 1. | "Cool Struttin'" | 5:27 |
| 2. | "Minor Meeting" | 4:36 |
| 3. | "Nicely" | 5:34 |
| 4. | "Something Special" | 4:45 |
| 5. | "Voodoo" | 10:57 |
| 6. | "Sonia" | 4:02 |
| 7. | "Sonny's Crib" | 7:40 |

All compositions by Sonny Clark
- Recorded at Classic Sound, New York on November 25 and 26, 1985

== Personnel ==
- John Zorn: alto saxophone
- Wayne Horvitz: piano/keyboards
- Ray Drummond: bass
- Bobby Previte: drums
