= In Memory of Nikki Arane =

Studio album by Eugene Chadbourne and John Zorn
- Released: 1996
- Recorded: 1980
- Genre: Avant-garde
- Length: 61:09
- Label: Incus Records

John Zorn chronology
Bar Kokhba (1996)	In Memory of Nikki Arane (1996)	Masada: Zayin (1996)

In Memory of Nikki Arane is an album of improvised music by Eugene Chadbourne and John Zorn recorded in 1980 but not released until 1996, on Derek Bailey's Incus Records. The album is named after a character from Stanley Kubrick's first major feature film The Killing (1956).

== Reception ==
The AllMusic review by Jesse Jarnow awarded the album 3 stars, stating: "Instead playing textural pieces to convey a mood or emotion, the duo create sounds that imitate actions. What actions, of course, are left entirely to the listener – though they are usually brutally violent or darkly industrial."

Professional ratings
Review scores
Source	Rating
AllMusic	3/5 stars
The Encyclopedia of Popular Music	3/5 stars

== Track listing ==
All tracks are written by Eugene Chadbourne & John Zorn.

No.	Title	Length
1.	"In Memory of Nikki Arane"	12:35
2.	"In Memory of Nikki Arane"	20:18
3.	"In Memory of Nikki Arane"	10:48
4.	"In Memory of Nikki Arane"	18:08
Total length:		1:01:09

== Personnel ==
- John Zorn – saxophones, clarinets, and game calls
- Eugene Chadbourne – modified acoustic and electric guitars, dobro, and other items
