= New Traditions in East Asian Bar Bands =

Studio album by John Zorn
- Released: 1997
- Recorded: 1986–1996
- Genre: Avant-garde
- Length: 72:38
- Label: Tzadik TZ 7311
- Producer: John Zorn

John Zorn chronology
Filmworks IV: S&M + More (1997)	New Traditions in East Asian Bar Bands (1997)

New Traditions in East Asian Bar Bands is the eighth album by American composer and saxophonist/multi-instrumentalist John Zorn consisting of improvised music from paired instruments and narration in Chinese, Korean and Vietnamese. The pieces are listed individually within Zorn's game pieces and were composed in 1986, 1988 and 1990 respectively.

== Reception ==
Stacia Proefrock of Allmusic stated, "This is one of John Zorn's greatest achievements to date.".

Professional ratings
Review scores
Source	Rating
Allmusic	4.5/5 stars

== Track listing ==
1. "Hu Die" - 25:09
2. "Hwang Chin-Ee" - 16:41
3. "Que Tran" - 30:46

All music by John Zorn.
Text by Arto Lindsay (Track 1), Myung Mi Kim (Track 2), and Lyn Hejinian (Track 3).

== Personnel ==
On 'Hue Die'

- Bill Frisell: Guitar
- Fred Frith: Guitar
- Zhang Jinglin: Narrator

On 'Hwang Chin-Ee'

- Joey Baron: Drums
- Samm Bennett: Drums
- Jung Hee Shin: Narrator

On 'Que Tran'

- Anthony Coleman: Keyboards
- Wayne Horvitz: Keyboards;
- Anh Tranc: Narrator
