= David Krakauer (musician) =

American musician

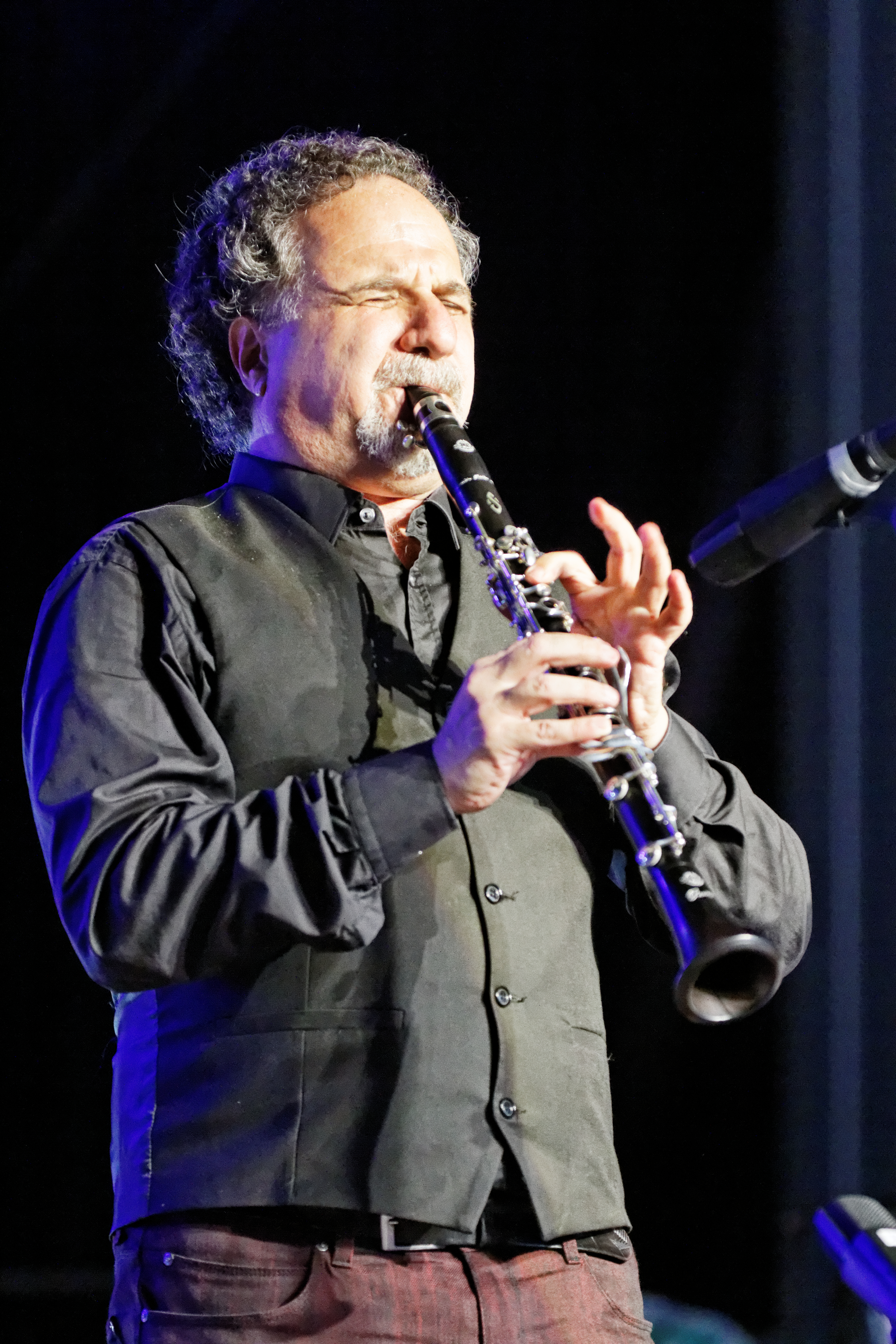
- David Krakauer at Festival de Cornouaille on July 24, 2014

Background information
- Born: September 22, 1956 (age 69)
- Origin: Manhattan, New York, U.S.
- Genres: Klezmer, classical, jazz
- Occupations: Musician, composer
- Instrument: Clarinet
- Labels: Label Bleu, Tzadik, Table Pounding
- Website: davidkrakauer.com

David Krakauer (born September 22, 1956) is an American clarinetist who performs klezmer, jazz, classical music, and avant-garde improvisation.

== Biography ==
Krakauer's performance career focused on jazz and classical music before he joined the Klezmatics in 1988. He sees klezmer as his "musical home," saying "I can write music within klezmer, improvise, do experimental stuff, be an interpreter and a preservationist. Every side of me can be fulfilled within this form."

In 1996, he formed his own band Klezmer Madness! While firmly rooted in traditional klezmer folk tunes, the band "hurls the tradition of klezmer music into the rock era". Klezmer Madness! has toured internationally to major venues and festivals including Carnegie Hall, the Library of Congress, Stanford Lively Arts, San Francisco Performances, Hancher Auditorium, the Krannert Center, the Venice Biennale, Kraków Jewish Culture Festival, BBC Proms, Saalfelden Jazz Festival, La Cigale, the Marciac festival, WOMEX, the New Morning in Paris and many others. In 2001, the rapper Socalled gave him an album that blended klezmer and hip-hop rhythms. Impressed by how "clever and funky it was," Krakauer incorporated Socalled into Klezmer Madness!, and the group began attracting a younger audience.

In 2006, Krakauer and Socalled formed the band Abraham Inc. with trombonist Fred Wesley (James Brown, Parliament Funkadelic, Count Basie Orchestra). Abraham Inc.'s music mixes klezmer, funk, and hip hop. The band has performed at The Apollo Theater and Symphony Space in New York, The Krannert Center in Illinois, Hancher Auditorium in Iowa, The Miller Outdoor Theater in Houston, The Strathmore in Maryland, Cal Performances, The Heineken Open'r Festival in Poland, The Cracow Jewish Culture Festival, the Transmusicales de Rennes, and Jazz a la Villette in Paris. Abraham Inc released the album Tweet Tweet in 2009 on Krakauer's own Table Pounding Records label. The album peaked at No. 1 in Funk and No. 1 in Jewish and Yiddish Music, and at No. 35 in music sales on Amazon. It reached No. 7 on Billboard's Jazz Chart and was featured at No. 40 on the Billboard Heatseekers Chart. In 2019, the band reunited and released a new album, Together We Stand, in response to the United States Muslim ban.

Krakauer has performed with orchestras internationally including the Dresdener Philharmonie, the Pacific Symphony, the Weimar Staatskapelle, Detroit Symphony, Phoenix Symphony, Colorado Music festival orchestra, Quebec Symphony, Seattle Symphony, Amsterdam Sinfonietta, New World Symphony, Brooklyn Philharmonic, Komische Oper orchestra and the Orchestre Lamoureux.

The clarinetist has also collaborated with composer Ofer Ben-Amots. Ben-Amots' composition Klezmer Concerto was specifically written for Krakauer to perform with string orchestra, harp and percussion.

Other career highlights include touring with the Emerson String Quartet; performing during the inaugural season of Carnegie Hall's Zankel Hall with renowned jazz pianist Uri Caine; an eight-year tenure with the Naumburg Award-winning Aspen Wind Quintet; tours with Music from Marlboro; composing the music for Offering, an homage to the victims of September 11 by modern dance duo Eiko and Koma; numerous performances of David Del Tredici's Magyar Madness, commissioned by Music Accord for Krakauer and the Orion String quartet; and performing in the International Emmy Award-winning BBC documentary Holocaust, A Music Memorial from Auschwitz with music by Osvaldo Golijov. Krakauer also performs with South African pianist Kathleen Tagg as the Krakauer-Tagg Duo.

Playwright and screenwriter Tony Kushner has said "Listening to David Krakauer had a tremendously powerful effect [on me]. It helped me discover Yiddish again, which was hugely important."

== Osvaldo Golijov's The Dreams and Prayers of Isaac the Blind ==
Krakauer partnered with the Kronos Quartet for the premiere recording of Osvaldo Golijov's The Dreams and Prayers of Isaac the Blind, released in 1997 on Nonesuch Records. Though the original composition was created for clarinet with string quartet, Golijov created an orchestral arrangement for the conductor-less chamber orchestra A Far Cry. The premiere orchestral recording was created with Krakauer as featured soloist and included on A Far Cry's 2014 album Dreams & Prayers, which was nominated in the Best Chamber Music/Small Ensemble Performance category of the 57th Grammy Awards.

== The Big Picture ==
Krakauer's album The Big Picture, which re-imagined themes from films such as Sophie's Choice, Life is Beautiful, The Pianist, and Radio Days, was released in North America on February 18, 2014. The album received 4.5 stars from Bill Milkowski at The Absolute Sound,, 4 stars from All About Jazz, and was a DownBeat Magazine Editors' Pick.

The accompanying show features original graphic projections by New York City visual-effects firm Light of Day and premiered with an eight show run at the Museum of Jewish Heritage in New York City.

== Ancestral Groove ==
Krakauer's album Checkpoint with his 4-piece band Ancestral Groove was released in Europe on March 3, 2014 on Label Bleu. The band supported the album with concerts throughout Europe, including a performance at the grand opening of the Museum of the History of Polish Jews on October 29, 2014.

== Awards and honors ==
He received a Grammy nomination in 2014, a Juno nomination in 2015, the Preis der Deutschen Schallplattenkritik in 2002 and a Diapason D'Or in 1998.

== Discography ==
- Klezmer Madness! (Tzadik, 1995)
- The Dreams and Prayers of Isaac the Blind, Kronos Quartet with David Krakauer (Nonesuch, 1997)
- Klezmer, NY: Klezmer Madness! (Tzadik, 1998)
- A New Hot One (Label Bleu, 2000)
- The Twelve Tribes (Label Bleu, 2001)
- Johannes Brahms, The New York Philomusica Chamber Ensemble (New York Philomusica, 2002)
- Klezmer Concertos and Encores (Milken Archive of Jewish Music, 2003)
- Music from the Winery (Tzadik, 2004)
- Krakauer Live in Krakow (Label Bleu, 2004)
- Bubbemeises: Lies My Gramma Told Me (Label Bleu, 2005)
- Moravec: Tempest Fantasy/Mood Swings/B.A.S.S. Variations, Trio Solisti & David Krakauer (Naxos, 2007)
- Tweet Tweet, Abraham Inc. (Table Pounding, 2009)
- Pruflas: The Book of Angels (Tzadik, 2012)
- Clarinet Concerto by Paul Moravec (BMOP Recirdsm 2012)
- The Hours Begin to Sing (Pentatone, 2013)
- The Best of David Krakauer (Label Bleu, 2013)
- The Big Picture (Table Pounding, 2014)
- Checkpoint (Label Bleu, 2014)
- Tahrir by Mohammed Fairouz (Naxos, 2014)
- Akoka: The Quartet for the End of Time Re-Framed (Oxingale, 2014)
- Dreams & Prayers, A Far Cry with David Krakauer (Crier, 2014)
- The Dreams and Prayers of Isaac the Blind by Osvaldo Golijov, Version for clarinet and string orchestra (Crier Records, 2015)
- Dobrek Bistro featuring David Krakauer (Dob Records, 2016)
- Magyar Madness by David Del Tredici (eOne, 2016)
- Anakronic/Krakauer: Electro Orkestra (Balagan Box, 2016)
- George Tsontakis: Anasa - True Colors - Unforgettable (Naxos, 2017)
- Akoka: The Quartet for the End of Time Re-Framed (Pentatone, 2017)
- Concerto for Klezmer Clarinet and Orchestra by Wlad Marhulets (Analekta Recordings, 2017)
- Lament/Witches’ Sabbath (Clarinet Concerto) by Mathew Rosenblum (New Focus Recordings, 2018)
- Together We Stand (2019)
- Breath & Hammer (Table Pounding, 2020)
- Mazel Tov Cocktail Party! (Table Pounding/Label Bleu, 2022)

With Anthony Coleman

- Selfhaters (Tzadik, 1996)

With Dobrek Bistro

- Dobrek Bistro (2014)

With White Willow

- Future Hopes (2017)
