= Michihiro Sato =

Japanese musician

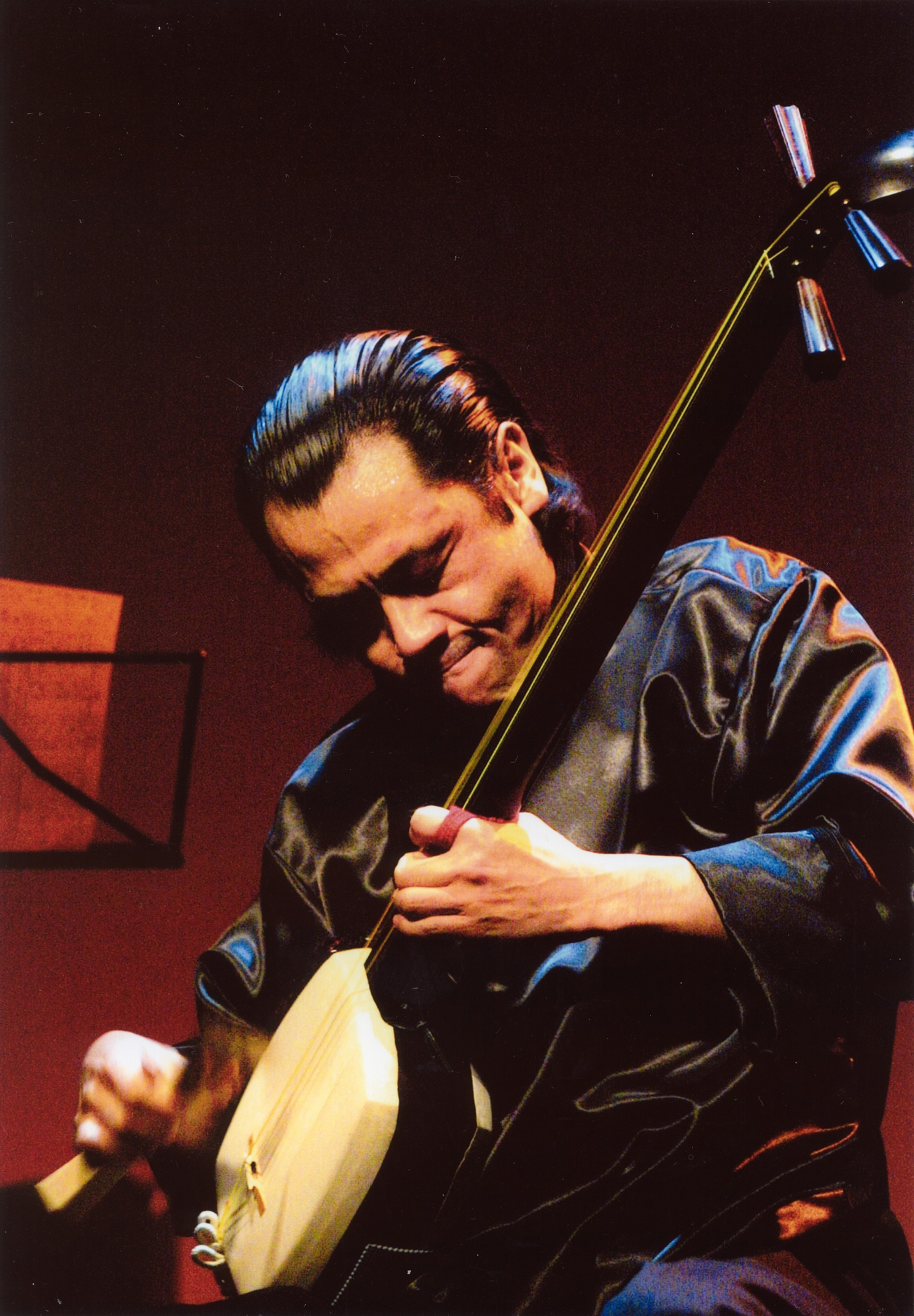
Michihiro Sato in 2003

Michihiro Sato (佐藤通弘, Satō Michihiro; surname Sato; name sometimes listed as Sato Michihiro; (born 1957), is a prominent Japanese player of the Tsugaru-jamisen.

Born in Machida, Tokyo, Japan, his mother was a traditional dancer and musician. He became interested in the Tsugaru-jamisen at an early age after hearing it on a radio broadcast and began intensive study of the instrument in 1970, at the age of 13. At that time, few young people were interested in this instrument; indeed, most of the other students were elderly. When he was a junior in college he moved to Hirosaki, Aomori to become an apprentice to master musician Chisato Yamada. In 1982 and 1983 he won first prize in the national Tsugaru-jamisen competition, becoming the first performer to win in two consecutive years. He eventually left his sensei to pursue his interest in free improvised music.

In 1986 Sato was awarded a Rockefeller Foundation grant, with which he pursued collaborations with musicians in New York. Since the mid-1980s he has recorded with John Zorn, Bill Frisell, Fred Frith, Tenko, Mark Miller, Nicolas Collins, Christian Marclay, Steve Coleman, Toh Ban Djan (Ikue Mori and Luli Shioi), Semantics (Elliott Sharp, Samm Bennett, and Ned Rothenberg), Tom Cora, Joey Baron, Mark Dresser, and Gerry Hemingway. He has performed in Japan, New York City, Canada, and Europe.

He is married to the koto player Sachiko Kaiho. His son, Michiyoshi Sato, also plays the Tsugaru-jamisen.

== Discography ==
=== As leader ===
- 1989 - Rodan (Hat Hut)
- Works Of (PSF)
- On a Cold, Cold Night (PSF)

=== As sideman ===
With John Zorn

- 1984 - Ganryu Island (Yukon; rereleased by Tzadik in 1998)

=== Contributing artist ===
- 1999 - The Rough Guide to the Music of Japan (World Music Network)

== Films ==
- 2006 - The World of Michihiro Sato. Produced by Kyoto Broadcasting System.
