= Freakish (Anthony Coleman album) =

Studio album by Anthony Coleman
- Released: September 29, 2009
- Recorded: 2009
- Genre: Jazz
- Length: 58:16
- Label: Tzadik TZ 7631
- Producer: Anthony Coleman

Anthony Coleman chronology
Lapidation (2007)	Freakish (2009)	The End of Summer (2013)

Freakish (subtitled Anthony Coleman Plays Jelly Roll Morton) is a solo album by pianist Anthony Coleman performing compositions by Jelly Roll Morton which was released on the Tzadik label in 2009.

== Reception ==
Professional ratings
Review scores
Source	Rating
Allmusic	4/5 stars

In his review for Allmusic, arwulf arwulf states "Coleman's readings of "The Crave," "The Pearls," "Frog-I-More," and "Mr. Jelly Lord" are so intelligently and creatively delivered that anyone with the slightest interest in 20th century music really ought to consider making time for this recital".

== Track listing ==
All compositions by Jelly Roll Morton

1. "Freakish" - 3:40
2. "Fickle Fay Creep (Soap Suds)" - 5:08
3. "Buffalo Blues (Mr. Joe)" - 3:41
4. "Frances (Fat Frances)" - 3:22
5. "Mr. Jelly Lord" - 4:03
6. "Mamanita" - 4:44
7. "Pretty Lil" - 3:57
8. "The Pearls" - 6:03
9. "Frog-I-More" - 5:22
10. "The Crave" - 3:29
11. "Mama's Got a Baby" - 4:05
12. "Freakish (Version Two)" - 4:21
13. "King Porter Stomp" - 6:25

== Personnel ==
- Anthony Coleman - piano
