= Selfhaters =

Live album by Anthony Coleman
- Released: 1996
- Recorded: December 29, 1993, July 29 and October 19, 1994, October 28, 1995, January 25 and March 17, 1996
- Venues: Kampo Recording Studio, Knitting Factory, Roulette, Alterknit and Baby Monster, New York City
- Genre: Jazz
- Length: 53:48
- Label: Tzadik TZ 7110
- Producer: Anthony Coleman

Anthony Coleman chronology
Sephardic Tinge (1995)	Selfhaters (1996)	I Could've Been a Drum (1997)

Selfhaters is an album by keyboardist Anthony Coleman which was released on the Tzadik label in 1996.

== Reception ==
Professional ratings
Review scores
Source	Rating
Allmusic	3/5 stars

In her review for Allmusic, Joslyn Layne notes that "Generally sounding more like a drunken choir, this instrumental group gets almost bluesy in a klezmer/avant-jazz kind of way. Coleman fans will dig it, as he has some fine organ moments throughout. The selections are, overall, more scattered, like threads tied at one end to a musical idea that are dispersed and floating in all directions, swirling around Coleman's playing".

== Track listing ==
All compositions by Anthony Coleman except as indicated

1. "Hidden Language" (Anthony Coleman, The Selfhaters) - 3:37
2. "Bim" - 4:29
3. "Eurotrash Ballade" (The Selfhaters) - 5:34
4. "You Don't Know What Love Is" (Gene de Paul, Don Raye) - 5:02
5. "The Dream Factory" - 11:01
6. "The Mooche" (Duke Ellington, Irving Mills) - 4:34
7. "Bom" (The Selfhaters) - 6:30
8. "Goodbye and Good Luck" - 13:01

== Personnel ==
- Anthony Coleman - piano, organ, trombone, accordion, sampler, voice
- Doug Wieselman - clarinet (tracks 1–5, 7 & 8)
- David Krakauer - bass clarinet (track 8)
- Michael Attias - clarinet, alto saxophone, baritone saxophone (tracks 3–6)
- Fred Lonberg-Holm - cello, banjo (tracks 3–6)
- Jim Pugliese - percussion
