= Jim Pugliese =

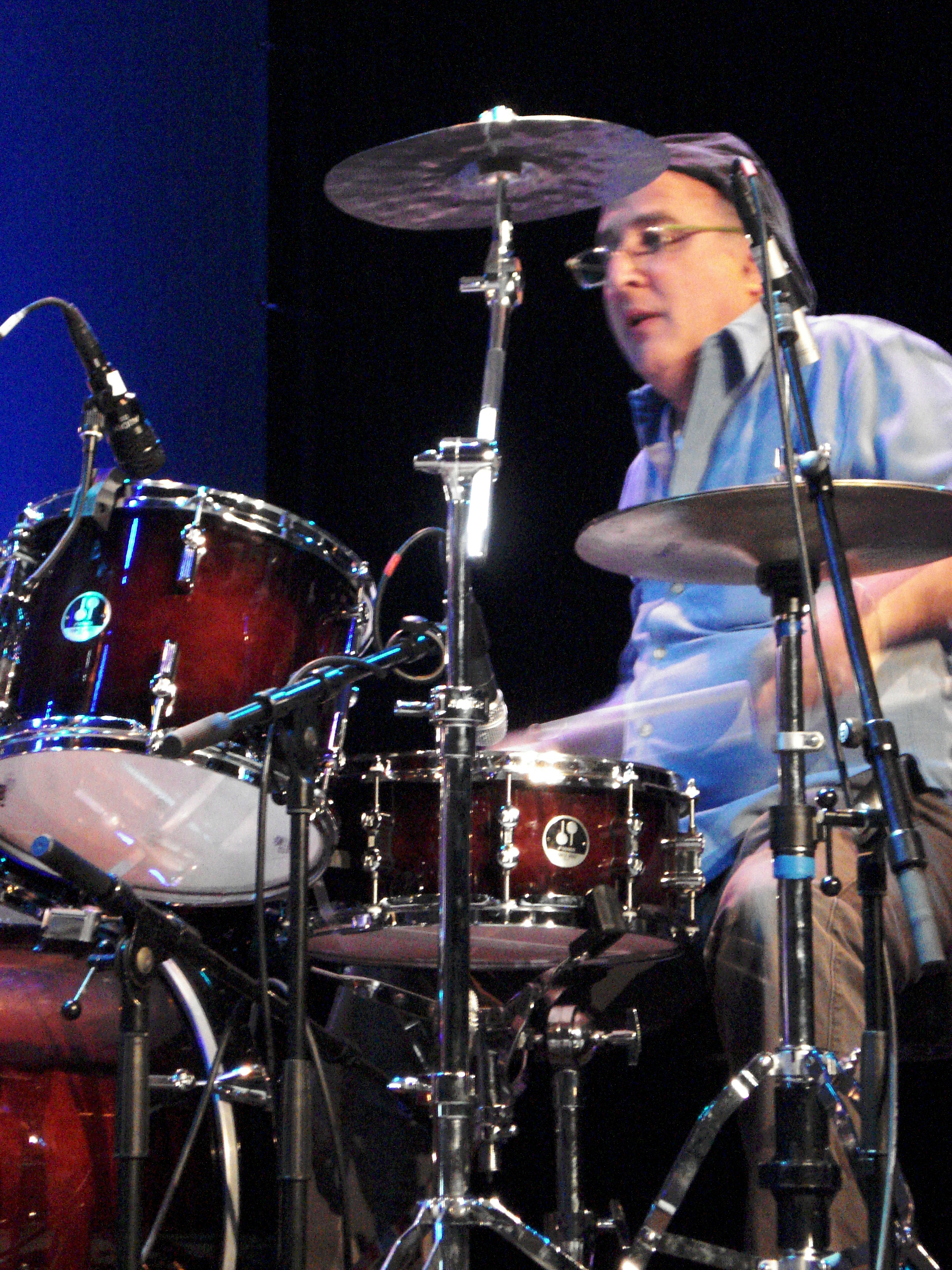
- Jim Pugliese live at Jazz Festival in Saalfelden, 2009. Photo by Davide Leonardi.

Background information
- Origin: Newark
- Genres: Jazz, funk, rock
- Occupation: Composer
- Instrument: Drums

James Pugliese (born Newark, New Jersey, 1952) is an American percussionist, drummer, composer and international recording artist on over 200 CDs of experimental, jazz and rock music.

His performing experience is diverse. As a percussionist, he has performed with The New York Philharmonic Horizon Series as a guest artist, New York City Ballet, and performer at music and jazz festivals in Europe, Japan and the USA.

Jim grew up listening to and playing soul music and rhythm and blues. He went on to study percussion with Raymond Des Roches, and by the age of eighteen he had recorded the music of Edgar Varese and Charles Wuorinen for Nonsuch Records. He continued performing and/or recording new music with John Cage, Lukas Foss, Kent Nagano, and The Philip Glass Ensemble. He spent twelve years as a member of Dean Drummond’s Newband and The Harry Partch Ensemble, studying and performing microtonal music. During this same period he developed an interest in Afro-Cuban music and studied drumming and rhythm with Master Drummer Pablo Landrum.

For the last forty years, while living in the East Village of New York City, Jim has been improvising, recording and touring with many of downtown's most prominent composer/improvisers including John Zorn, Marc Ribot, Zeena Parkins, Bobby Previte and Anthony Coleman On November 23, 1997 Avant released the first cd for his collaborative percussion trio Easside Percussion with Christine Bard and Michael Evans.

One of his latest projects, "Phase III," is a continuation of his ongoing quest to combine his diverse performing experiences into a single new sound with its base in rhythm. The music skirts and shifts along the edges of free improvisation, deep groove, and New Music. The music reflects Jim's vision to explore the powerful, enlightening, and spiritual secrets of drumming. It is inspired by his recent association and work with Nii Tettey Tetteh, master musician from Ghana, with Milford Graves, learning drumming and healing through the heartbeat, and his study of the spiritual songs of the Mbira Dzavadzimu from Zimbabwe.

Jim's CD "Live @ Issue Project Room NYC" won "Best New Release of 2008" in "All About Jazz NY". His other current projects include a collaborative band "IDR" with Marco Cappelli, exploring the relationship between Southern Italian Folk Music and Improvisation Pugliese has been teaching music composition, song writing and, percussion at New York's Fiorello H. LaGuardia High School of Music & Art and Performing Arts for the last 25 years through a generous grant from BMI music. IDR, also known as Italian Doc Remix, was developed through Pugliese's collaboration with Cappelli and included improvised arrangements of traditional Italian melodies.

== Discography ==
With Anthony Coleman

- Selfhaters (Tzadik, 1996)
- The Abysmal Richness of the Infinite Proximity of the Same (Tzadik, 1998)
- Pushy Blueness (Tzadik, 2006)
- Lapidation (New World, 2007)
