= David Weinstein (musician) =

American musician and composer (born 1954)

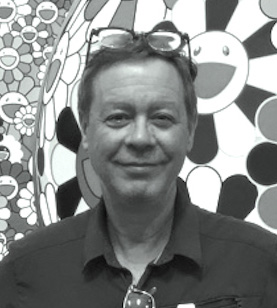
- David Weinstein, 2018, courtesy Roulette. Photo by Janet Raczak.
- Born: David Allen Weinstein; July 21, 1954 (age 71); Chicago, IL
- Education: University of Illinois B.M. and M.M. in Music Composition 1976, 1978
- Known for: Composer, electronic keyboardist, co-founder of Roulette, arts administrator, curator, archivist, producer of independent radio
- Movement: Experimental music
- Spouse: Laurie Szujewska 1974–1992
- Awards: Emerging Artist Award, Monument Show; National Endowment for the Arts; Mary Flagler Cary Charitable Trust Commission; Prix Ars Electronica; Grammy Museum; Prix Futura

David Weinstein is an American musician, composer, electronic keyboardist, sound designer, audio engineer, curator, producer, and archivist. In 1978, with Jim Staley, Dan Senn, and Laurie Szujewska, Weinstein cofounded the avant-garde music series Roulette Intermedium. Weinstein was MoMA/PS1 Director of Public Programs and Managing Director of its radio station, Art Radio WPS1.org, from 2004–2008. He was a Board member and Program Director of the Manhattan alternative space, Clocktower Gallery, and its radio station, Art International Radio, from 2009–15. Since 2016, he has hosted several radio programs and a podcast exploring historic and emerging trends in experimental music. In 2019, he became the archivist and Director of Special Projects for Roulette. As a composer, performer, and collaborator, Weinstein has worked with his own group, Impossible Music, as well as Doris Vila, Butch Morris, Elliott Sharp, John Zorn, Shelley Hirsch, Ned Rothenberg, Paul Dresher, Rhys Chatham, and many others from New York’s downtown experimental music scene. He is known for his traveling installation Illuminated Man (1981) and the albums Haiku Lingo (Review Records/No Man’s Land, 1990) and Perfume (Avant, 1998). In 1992, Weinstein and Shelley Hirsch were awarded the Prix Futura for their collaboration on Hirsch’s “docu-musical” O Little Town of East New York. In 2002, he and Doris Vila won the Jury Prix Ars Electronica for the interactive multimedia installation, The Story Machine, in Bonn, Germany.

== Early life and education ==
Born in Chicago in 1954, David Weinstein attended Evanston Township High School 1968–72. At the University of Illinois Urbana-Champaign (1972–76), he studied piano, as well as violin, contrabass, and voice, with a focus on composition rather than performance. In graduate school, also at University of Illinois, he concentrated on composition with Ben Johnston (1972–76)—a colleague of the pioneering American composer and music theorist Harry Partch—who introduced Weinstein to microtonal music along with deep dives into structure, and Sal Martirano (1976–78), an electronic musician and composer. He worked regularly in their legendary electronic music studios.

From 1976–78, Weinstein taught basic music theory and electronic music techniques at the University of Illinois. From 1978–79, he taught piano and theory at Old Town School of Folk Music, Chicago.

In 1978, Weinstein got together with four friends who had also graduated from the University of Illinois—including trombonist Jim Staley, sound-artist Dan Senn, graphic artist Laurie Szujewska, and composer David Means—to form the non-profit Roulette Intermedium Inc., an artists’ collective for the presentation of music, dance, and intermedia. Their first concert was performed at the Old Town School of Folk Music on November 12, 1978.

== Roulette ==
After graduating from the University of Illinois with Bachelor and Master’s Degrees in Music, Weinstein joined Szujewska in Chicago in 1978. There, he continued to perform on piano and homemade acoustic instruments at venues including N.A.M.E Gallery, Old Town School and MoMing Dance Center. The following year, Weinstein and Szujewska moved to New York, where they collaborated on developing Roulette into a performance venue in Staley’s TriBeCa loft. Weinstein served as Roulette’s Director of Development (among other positions) from 1979 to 1994, a period when Roulette emerged as one of New York’s most important venues for improvised, experimental music.

During the early years in New York, 1980–1982, Weinstein apprenticed with the master craftsman George Sell, who taught him carpentry, model-making, and stained glass techniques. He also worked as a studio assistant for artists Red Grooms and Judy Pfaff; worked behind the scenes on Sesame Street and The Muppets; and worked as a sound technician for composer Steve Reich.

In 1980, while continuing his work for Roulette, Weinstein began composition and fabrication of a large-scale, floor-based, graphical score called Illuminated Man, which would travel to the West Coast, Canada, and the New Music America Festival in Hartford, CT, in 1984. Afterward, it traveled throughout Europe, including to the Serpentine Gallery in London. Then in 1986, Weinstein acquired an Ensoniq Mirage sampling keyboard, which allowed him to work independently at home, developing arrangements and composing. The instrument could play the sounds of flutes, violins, or pure noise, allowing him to imagine composition in new ways. He collaborated with major performers, including Shelley Hirsch, Ellen Fulman, and Elliott Sharp, and traveled to Europe to perform with John Zorn, Bill Frisell, and others.

As an integral part of the Downtown NYC music scene, Weinstein composed and performed original music, and continued to install site specific works from 1978 to 1994. In 1988, he formed Impossible Music with Tim Spelios, Nicolas Collins, David Shea, and Ted Greenwald. Rather than traditional instruments, the group exclusively used portable CD players, looping and layering sound effects and music.

Together they were featured on MTV News. Spelios and Weinstein have occasionally reconstituted the project with updated tech.

At this time, Weinstein traveled extensively throughout the US and Europe, performing with a variety of ensembles at the Brooklyn Academy of Music, the Walker Arts Center in Minneapolis, the Portland Art Museum, Canada’s Victoriaville Festival, the Stuttgart Opera, the Munich State Opera, the Berlin Jazz Festival, Amsterdam’s Shaffy Theatre, LOD Festival in Belgium, the Taktlos Festival in Zurich, and in many other museums, galleries, and concert halls, large and small. His technical skills were also in demand for audio engineering projects and production for concerts, recordings, theater, film, video, and dance.

== Select Musical Projects ==
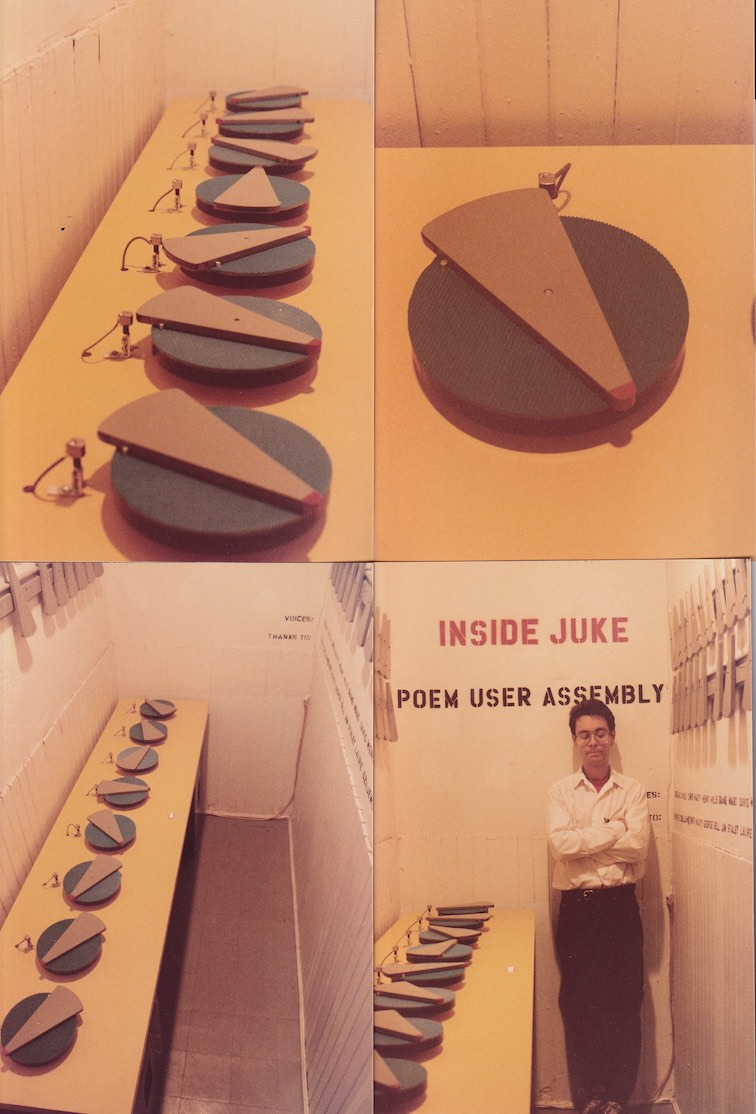
David Weinstein with his Poem User Assembly installation at PS 1 Contemporary Art Center, 1982

Weinstein’s floorpiece installation Bicyclopedia, featuring glass, plastic, wooden and metal objects such as balls, goblets, cans, toys, beads, and other things collected by him over the years, premiered at the exhibition Shishkapop: The Movie at Dance Theatre Workshop NYC in 1992. For each new installation, some indigenous objects would be collected from the neighborhood and added to the mix. For example, for a 1993 installation that Gallerie O Zwei organized as part of the East Berlin nachtbogen 3 festival, Weinstein gathered hundreds of coal bricks from the furnaces of a bathhouse, spilled them onto the sidewalk, and began the assembly process by making patterns using the black coal. As the floor design progressed (for some 30 meters along the front of the building), objects such as glass items, rubber balls, and other toys were introduced—somewhat like themes in a musical piece—and threaded together over the space. The piece has been shown in New York at the Kitchen, Performing Garage and across the US and Europe.

From 1995–2005 Weinstein contributed electronics and keyboard work for projects by artists including Rhys Chatham, Zeena Parkins, Ned Rothenberg, Paul Dresher, Elliott Sharp, John Zorn, and others.

In the late-1990s, Weinstein worked regularly with the video performance ensemble The Poool, and in 1999, he participated in The Poool (is warm), performed in collaboration with musicians Hoppy Kamiyama and Jason Kao Hwang with live video performance installation by Benton Bainbridge, Angie Eng, and Nancy Meli Walker, for the Impulsive Behavior series at the Whitney Museum at Philip Morris.

In 1999 and 2000, in collaboration with video and hologram artist Doris Vila, he composed the music for and co-designed the interactive multimedia installation, The Story Machine. It was exhibited at Animax Multimedia Theatre in Bonn, Germany, as part of Europe’s multi-site Expo 2000 Festival and at the Whitney Museum at Philip Morris.

From 1986–2006 Weinstein was a member of Elliott’s Sharp’s industrial noise band, Carbon, recording and traveling widely across the USA and Europe. In Sharp’s large ensemble, Orchestra Carbon, he played sampling keyboard for two new works, Radiolaria, and SyndaKit, which were performed at The Knitting Factory and Tonic, New York.

During this time, while teaching at the School of the Museum of Fine Arts, he guest curated Music on a Long Thin Wire (2000–2001). With composer Alvin Lucier, he organized and installed this renowned work in the Museum of Fine Arts, Boston’s Modern wing. It ran for four months. Simultaneously, he curated Dangerous Waves (2001)—featuring works by Ron Kuivila and Liz Phillips/Anney Bonney—at the Grossman Gallery at the School of the Museum of Fine Arts in Boston.

The year 2001 would begin an intensely productive period for Weinstein. In January 2001, he produced and organized Masters of Massive Minimalism, a two night mini-festival of the music of Tony Conrad, Arnold Dreyblatt, and Jim O’Rourke at Tonic in New York City. This was released as an album on Black Truffle in 2023.

In 2002, he composed, performed music, and contributed sound design for the multimedia theater work 1,2,3, much, based on the life and work of Adolf Wolfli, with video and hologram artist Doris Vila. It was presented as part of the special events surrounding an exhibition of Wolfli’s work at the American Folk Art Museum in New York. This work was produced for television broadcast and DVD release by Downtown Community Television and Roulette, New York.

Later in 2002, in collaboration with Vila and the production team MEET, his work was included in FX Factory, a 48-channel audio installation, as part of an interactive multimedia work for Animax Multimedia Theatre in Bonn, Germany. This work was awarded the Jury Prize at Ars Electronica in September 2002, in Linz, Austria. He collaborated with Vila again, in 2005, on Paradox Beach, a children’s learning game that became a permanent installation at the Staten Island Children’s Museum.

From the mid-1990s onward, Weinstein also used his electronic expertise to work in a variety of commercial fields, including as a computer consultant, a sound designer, a production manager for the Co-op City Times, and as a multimedia content producer for Morgan Stanley, which continued until 2005.

As a teacher, Weinstein was guest faculty at Yale University, teaching seminars on ancient tunings and temperaments (1983); College of Staten Island (CUNY), teaching basic music theory and music history (1984); and at the School of the Museum of Fine Arts, Boston, teaching seminars and workshops on sound installation (2000–2001).

From 2004–2008, he was Director of Public Programs at Long Island City’s P.S.1 Contemporary Art Center, as well as Managing Director of the museum’s Manhattan satellite, Clocktower Gallery. He also ran the Clocktower radio station, Art Radio WPS1.org. From 2005 until 2007, he served as curatorial director of MoMA PS1’s summer concert series, Warm Up. In 2006, he started the Historic Audio Restoration Project at Clocktower Radio with the assistance of scholar Tennae Maki, preserving archival broadcasts from WPS1 and WBAI radio, including the archives of Charles Ruas and Allen Ginsberg, among others. Other series included the Clocktower Oral History Project, Poetry Society of America, PennSound, Emerging Underground, and livestreamed concerts and events.

In 2009, the Clocktower Gallery and radio station became independent from what is now MoMA PS1. Weinstein continued as Board member and Program Director of the Manhattan alternative space from 2009–15. In this role, he was Executive Producer of its radio programming for online station ARTonAIR.org. He was also Curator of music, sound, and media installations, Editor of the Clocktower website, and responsible for managing staff and policy.

From 2015–2019, Weinstein recorded and archived the Endless Broken Time series, a monthly storytelling performance by Matt Freedman (narration and illustration) and Tim Spelios (percussion) at Larry Greenberg’s Studio 10 in Bushwick, Brooklyn.

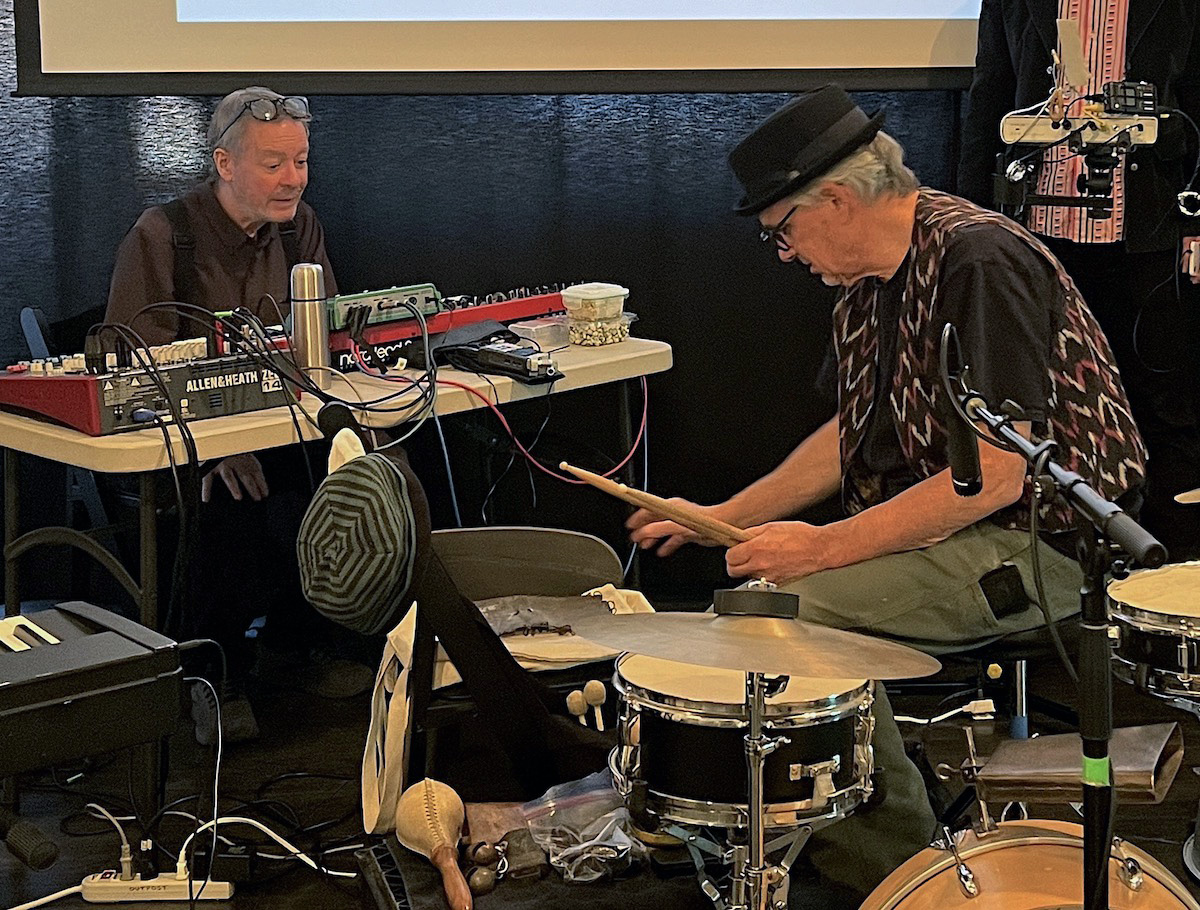
David Weinstein (keyboards) and Tim Spelios (percussion) performing Oct. 26, 2024 at the opening for the exhibition “One for the Ages: The World of Matt Freedman” at the Cabinet Magazine Gallery in Brooklyn, NY.

After working with Clocktower and PS1, in 2016, he was called back to Roulette to assist in the operations of its new Brooklyn theater. As Director of Special Projects and resident archivist and historian, one of his major initiatives has been to preserve recordings and visual materials related to the organization’s five-decade history. In this role, he has processed and distributed more than 4,000 concert recordings made since 1980; digitized legacy concert videos made 1990–2012; and produced radio and podcast programs from Archive materials.

Starting in 2016, Weinstein also became host of the weekly radio program Ridgewood Radio, produced with Outpost Artists Resources in Ridgewood, Queens, and broadcast on WFMU’s Give The Drummer Radio stream. He has released hundreds of programs during this time, including unreleased and archival tracks, historic concerts, live recordings, and structured improvisations. He also broadcasts on Wave Farm’s WGXC 90.7FM, and with partner stations around the world.

In 2023, he was invited by the poet Ellen Zweig to collaborate on Fictions of the Physical, creating new music tracks and restoring the artists’ recordings from the 1970s. He continues to perform with a range of musicians.

As a musician and composer, David Weinstein remains engaged in exploring experimentation across all genres. His arts administrative and activist work includes programming, community outreach, media, promotion, and consultation. As a producer, he is expert in all technical aspects of production and performance. As an archivist, he is dedicated to preserving the history of the performing arts.

== Select Discography ==
=== As a Composer ===
- Fiction of the Physical (Phantom Limb), works with poet Ellen Zweig, 2023
- The Wild and Wacky Worlds of Shelley Hirsch (Tzadik), in collaboration with the singer, 2003
- Perfume (Avant), solo electronic works, 1998.
- O Little Town of East New York (Tzadik), in collaboration with Shelley Hirsch, 1995.
- Caged/Uncaged (Cramps), compilation, homage to John Cage produced by PS1/Institute for Contemporary Art for the Venice Biennale, 1993.
- Bang On A Can Vol 2 (CRI) compilation from the festival, 1993.
- State of the Union (MuWorks), compilation of works with political content, 1993.
- Haiku Lingo (Review Records/No Man’s Land), works with vocalist Shelley Hirsch, 1990.
- Angelica 91 (I disci di angelica), compilation from festival in Bologna, 1990.
- Journal de Spirou (Nato), compilation of works based on French comic books, 1990.
- A Confederacy of Dances (Einstein), compilation of new music from the Roulette Archive, Roulette Series, New York. 1992.
- Imaginary Landscapes (Nonesuch), compilation of electronic music from The Kitchen, including works by Christian Marclay, MaryAnne Amacher, Nicolas Collins, Alvin Lucier and others. 1989.

=== As a Musician ===
- Radiolaria (ZoAr), large ensemble works by Elliott Sharp, 2002.
- Interference (Atavistic), ensemble music by Elliott Sharp, 1995.
- Amusia (Atavistic), ensemble music by Elliott Sharp, 1994.
- Truthtable (Homestead), ensemble music by Elliott Sharp, 1993.
- Tocsin (Enemy), ensemble music by Elliott Sharp, 1991.
- Homeing (Intakt), ensemble music by Butch Morris, 1990.
- KLAV (Newport Classics), keyboard music by Elliott Sharp, 1990.
- Spillane (Elektra/Nonesuch), ensemble music by John Zorn, 1989.
- Cobra (Hat Art), ensemble music by John Zorn, 1991.
- The Big Gundown (Elektra/Nonesuch), ensemble music by John Zorn, 1988.
- Film Works (Elektra/Nonesuch), film scores by John Zorn, 1990.
- Godard (Nato), ensemble music by John Zorn, 1988.

=== As a Producer ===
- Ashcan Orchestra (WFMU) 2025, unreleased and archival tracks from Pat Spadine’s project
- Jerome Cooper Multidimensional Drummer (WFMU) 2024, unreleased tracks by the musician/composer
- Tony Conrad, Arnold Dreyblatt, Jim O’Rourke: Tonic 19-01-2001 (Black Truffle) 2023, event producer for concert
- Garage Gamelan (WFMU) 2023, traditional and synthetic gamelan tracks by composers from Bali to Scotland to Seattle
- Fire Over Heaven (WFMU) 2022, compilation of live recordings from the concert series at Outpost Artists Resources
- Jerry Hunt: The Lost Tapes (WFMU) 2021, live concert recording by the musical shaman
- Greater Ridgewood Territory Band (WFMU) 2020, structured improvisations from Che Chen, Ka Baird, Todd Capp, Talice Lee
- Equilibrium & Hysteria (WFMU) 2019, compilation of live recordings from New York clubs
- Noise By People (WFMU) 2018, compilation of live recordings from New York clubs
- Distressed, Disturbed, Disrupted & Displayed (WFMU) 2017, compilation of live recordings from New York clubs
