= Anthony Coleman =

American jazz pianist (born 1955)

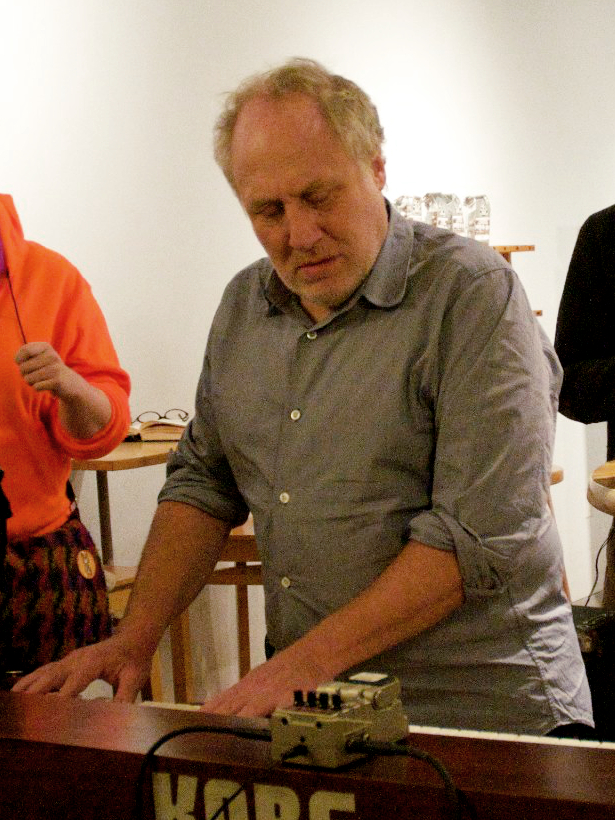
- Coleman at Café Fixe, October 9, 2012

Background information
- Born: August 30, 1955 (age 70); New York City, U.S.
- Genres: Avant-garde jazz, chamber music, free improvisation, free jazz, Jewish Music
- Occupations: Musician, composer
- Instruments: Piano, keyboards
- Years active: 1977–present
- Labels: Tzadik, Knitting Factory, Hathut

Anthony Coleman (born August 30, 1955) is an American composer and avant-garde jazz pianist. During the 1980s and 1990s he worked with John Zorn on Cobra, Kristallnacht, The Big Gundown, Archery, and Spillane and helped push modern Jewish music into the 21st century.

== Career ==
At the age of thirteen, Coleman started studying piano with Jaki Byard. At the New England Conservatory of Music he studied with George Russell, Donald Martino and Malcolm Peyton.

Coleman's collaborators over the years have included guitarist Elliott Sharp, trumpeter Dave Douglas, accordion player Guy Klucevsek, composer David Shea, former Captain Beefheart bandmember Gary Lucas, classical and klezmer clarinetist David Krakauer, guitarist Marc Ribot, bassist Greg Cohen, drummer Joey Baron and saxophonist Roy Nathanson.

Coleman's compositions and solo work reflect his interest in his Jewish background. His groups Sephardic Tinge and Selfhaters in the 1990s explored both the lively, rich and exuberant musical legacy as well as darkly described the lamentation of a minority culture in Diaspora. Sephardic Tinge toured extensively, especially throughout Europe, in the 1990s and the early 2000s.

Coleman's Disco by Night is a work inspired by his visit to his family's homeland of Yugoslavia and was his first major solo record released by Japan's Avant Records in 1992.Shmutsige Magnaten, in which he played the songs of Yiddish folk composer Mordechai Gebirtig, a victim of the Holocaust was also released by Tzadik Records in 2006. It was recorded live at midnight in the oldest synagogue of Kraków, Poland, a few steps away from Gebirtig's birthplace during the annual Kraków Jewish Music Festival in 2005.

His duo albums, The Coming Great Millenium, Lobster & Friend, and I Could've Been a Drum with Roy Nathanson, mostly explore the fun, frivolous and joyous alongside the nostalgic hearts and minds of Jews in modern and old America. These recordings typify Coleman's "free" playing style as well as his multi-instrumental capabilities with him also operating samplers, trombones, percussion as well as piano and voice. Coleman and Nathanson have performed all over the U.S. and Europe.

Coleman is also an accomplished composer with many works being commissioned by numerous ensembles including the 2006 work Pushy Blueness which was released on Tzadik.

His work includes Damaged by Sunlight, issued on DVD in France by La Huit, the album Freakish: Anthony Coleman plays Jelly Roll Morton (Tzadik); a monthlong residency in Venice as a guest of Venetian Heritage, a commission for the Parisian Ensemble Erik Satie: Echoes From Elsewhere; tours of Japan and Europe with guitarist Marc Ribot's band Los Cubanos Postizos; a lecture/performance as part of the symposium "Anton Webern und das Komponieren im 20 Jahrhundert" (Neue Perspektiven, Basel, Switzerland) and a commission from the String Orchestra of Brooklyn (Empfindsamer).

He has been on the faculty of the New England Conservatory of Music since 2005 and Mannes College New School for Music since 2012. His album The End of Summer features his NEC Ensemble Survivors Breakfast.

== Other activities ==
Coleman has degrees in composition from the New England Conservatory of Music and the Yale School of Music and attended Mauricio Kagel's seminar at Centre Acanthes in Aix-en-Provence, France. He has received grants and residencies from the New York Foundation for the Arts, the Djerassi Colony, the Civitella Ranieri Center, the Freie und Hansestadt Hamburg Kulturbehörde and the Yellow Springs Arts Center. He spent the spring semester of 2003 teaching theory and composition at Bennington College in Vermont. In 2004 he was the subject of a three-day festival, Abstract Adventures, in Brussels, Belgium.

Coleman writes articles for All About Jazz and Bomb magazine and was a contributor to John Zorn's essay collection Arcana: Musicians on Music in 2000.

== Films ==
In the mid 1990s, Coleman appeared in Sabbath in Paradise, Claudia Heuermann's documentary about Jewish music in the avant-garde downtown scene in New York, A Bookshelf on Top of the Sky, Heuermann's documentary about John Zorn, and Following Eden. In 2005 Coleman was interviewed for the Marc Ribot documentary The Lost String, directed by Anais Prosaic.

== Discography ==
=== As leader ===
- Disco by Night (Avant, 1992)
- The Coming Great Millenium... (Knitting Factory, 1992) with Roy Nathanson
- Lobster and Friend (Knitting Factory, 1993) with Roy Nathanson
- Sephardic Tinge (Tzadik, 1995)
- Selfhaters (Tzadik, 1996)
- I Could've Been a Drum (Tzadik, 1997) with Roy Nathanson
- The Abysmal Richness of the Infinite Proximity of the Same (Tzadik, 1998)
- Morenica (Tzadik, 1998)
- With Every Breath: The Music of Shabbat at BJ (Knitting Factory, 1999)
- Our Beautiful Garden is Open (Tzadik, 2002)
- Shmutsige Magnaten (Tzadik, 2006)
- Pushy Blueness (Tzadik, 2006)
- Lapidation (New World, 2007)
- Freakish (Tzadik, 2009)
- The End of Summer (Tzadik, 2013)

=== As sideman ===
With Ron Anderson

- Secret Curve (Tzadik, 2011)

With Andrea Centazzo

- Back to the Future (Ictus, 2005)

With Dave Douglas

- Sanctuary (Avant, 1997)

With David Krakauer

- Klezmer Madness! (Tzadik, 1995)

With Ikue Mori

- B/Side (Tzadik, 1998)
- One Hundred Aspects of the Moon (Tzadik, 2000)

With Marc Ribot

- Rootless Cosmopolitans (Island, 1990)
- Requiem for What's His Name (Les Disques du Crepuscule, 1992)
- Shoe String Symphonettes (Tzadik, 1997)
- The Prosthetic Cubans (Atlantic, 1998)
- ¡Muy Divertido! (Atlantic, 2000)
- Scelsi Morning (Tzadik, 2003)
- Soundtracks Volume 2 (Tzadik, 2003)

With Wadada Leo Smith

- Lake Biwa (Tzadik, 2004)

With John Zorn

- Archery (Parachute, 1982)
- The Big Gundown (Nonesuch, 1986)
- Cobra (Hathut, 1986)
- Spillane (Elektra Nonesuch, 1987)
- Filmworks 1986–1990 (Elektra Nonesuch, 1992)
- Kristallnacht (Eva, 1993)
- John Zorn's Cobra: Live at the Knitting Factory (Knitting Factory, 1995)
- Filmworks II: Music for an Untitled Film by Walter Hill (Tzadik, 1996)
- Filmworks III: 1990–1995 (Tzadik, 1996)
- Bar Kokhba (Tzadik, 1996)
- Filmworks IV: S&M + More (Tzadik, 1997)
- New Traditions in East Asian Bar Bands (Tzadik, 1997)
- Duras: Duchamp (Tzadik, 1997)
- The Parachute Years (Tzadik, 1997)
- Filmworks VIII: 1997 (Tzadik, 1998)
- The Bribe (Tzadik, 1998)
- Music for Children (Tzadik, 1998)
- Godard/Spillane (Tzadik, 1999)
- Voices in the Wilderness (Tzadik, 2003)

== Filmography ==
- Sabbath in Paradise (1997)
- A Bookshelf on Top of the Sky: 12 Stories About John Zorn (1999)
- The Lost String (2005)
- Following Eden (2006)

== Compositions ==
- Latvian Counter-Gambit, for Chamber Orchestra
- Mise en Abime
- Goodbye and Good Luck
