= Stefan Grossman discography =

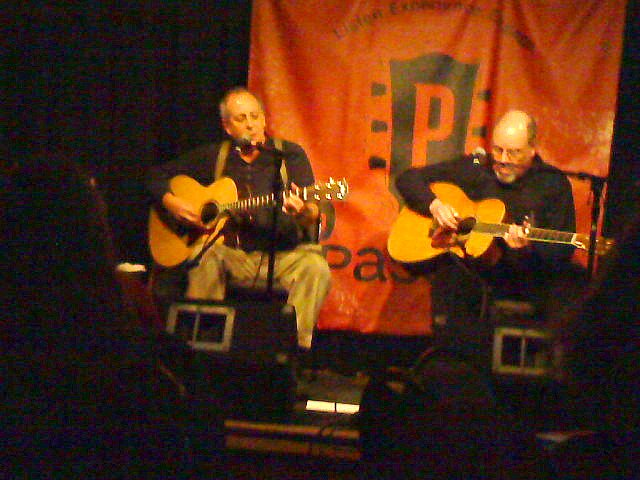
- With Steve Katz at Passim coffeehouse in Cambridge, MA on Jan. 22, 2012
- Studio albums: 22
- Live albums: 2
- Compilation albums: 12
- Video albums: 22

Stefan Grossman is an American acoustic fingerstyle guitarist and singer. His discography consists of 22 studio albums, 2 live albums, 12 compilations, 22 videos, and 14 collaborations with other artists. In addition, his production, compositions and guitar work have been featured on a number of albums by other artists.

== Studio albums ==
- 1966 : How to Play Blues Guitar (Elektra) reissued in 1971 on XTRA with Aurora Block (Rory Block) listed as collaborator
- 1968 : Aunt Molly's Murray Farm (Fontana)
- 1969 : The Gramercy Park Sheik (Fontana)
- 1970 : The Ragtime Cowboy Jew (Transatlantic)
- 1970 : Yazoo Basin Boogie (Transatlantic)
- 1971 : Those Pleasant Days (Transatlantic)
- 1972 : Hot Dogs (Transatlantic)
- 1973 : Memphis Jellyroll (Transatlantic)
- 1974 : Finger Picking Guitar Techniques (Kicking Mule)
- 1975 : Bottleneck Serenade (Transatlantic)
- 1975 : Ritratto D'America (Octopus) - released in Italy
- 1976 : My Creole Belle (Transatlantic)
- 1978 : How To Play Blues Vol 2 (Kicking Mule)
- 1980 : Thunder on the Run (Kicking Mule)
- 1982 : Blues And Ragtime Guitar (KPM Music)
- 1985 : Shining Shadows (Shanachie)
- 1986 : Struttin' Out (KPM Music)
- 1988 : Love, Devils and the Blues (Shanachie)
- 1990 : Guitar Landscapes (Shanachie)
- 1990 : How To Play Blues Guitar (Shanachie) content differs from 1966 album with same title
- 1998: Stefan Grossman's Shake That Thing: Fingerpicking Country Blues (Kicking Mule)
- 2013 : Blues For The Mann: A Collection Of Country Blues (Stefan Grossman's Guitar Workshop)

== Live albums ==
- 1973 : Live! (Transatlantic)
- 1977 : Country Blues Guitar Festival (Sonet) with Son House, Jo Ann Kelly, Sam Mitchell, and Mike Cooper

== Compilations ==
- 1973 : Guitar Instrumentals (Transatlantic)
- 1974 : Acoustic Music for Body and Soul (Kicking Mule)
- 1975 : The Gramercy Park Sheik / Aunt Molly's Murray Farm (EMI) - compilation of two albums - also released in 2010 by Stefan Grossman's Guitar Workshop
- 1977 : The Guitar Of Stefan Grossman (Transatlantic)
- 1977 : Box Set (Transatlantic) compilation of three albums
- 1979 : Anthology (Transatlantic)
- 1984 : Guitar Festival (Kicking Mule) - including his County Blues Guitar album
- 1991 : Black Melodies on a Clear Afternoon (Shanachie)
- 1991 : Yazoo Basin Boogie (Shanachie) - contains music from original albums Yazoo Basin Boogie and Memphis Jellyroll
- 1996 : The Best Of The Transatlantic Years (Essential) - compiled music from Hot Dogs, Those Pleasant Days, and Ragtime Cowboy Jew.
- 2004 : Those Pleasant Days: The Transatlantic Anthology (Castle Music)
- 2007: Flowers On The Wall: The Unique Art of Stefan Grossman (Él / Cherry Red)

== Collaborations ==
=== With Duck Baker ===
- 1997 : Northern Skies, Southern Blues (Acoustic Music)

=== With Mickey Baker ===
- 1976 : Blues And Jazz Guitar (Kicking Mule)

=== With Ton Van Bergeyk ===
- 1975 : How To Play Ragtime Guitar (Kicking Mule)

=== With Rory Block ===
- 2008 : Country Blues Guitar: Rare Archival Recording 1963–1971 (Rare Archival Records / Stefan Grossman's Guitar Workshop)

=== With Paul Jones ===
- 1985 : The Blues Collection (KPM Music)

=== With Danny Kalb ===
- 1969 : Crosscurrents (Cotillion)

=== Danny Kalb and Steve Katz ===
- 2007 : Played a Little Fiddle (Stefan Grossman's Guitar Workshop)

=== With John Renbourn ===
- 1978 : Stefan Grossman and John Renbourn (Kicking Mule)
- 1978: Acoustic Guitar (Eastworld)
- 1979 : Under the Volcano (Kicking Mule)
- 1984 : Live... In Concert (Shanachie)
- 1986 : The Three Kingdoms (Shanachie)
- 1989 : Snap A Little Owl (Shanachie)

=== With Tokio Uchida ===
- 2007: Bermuda Triangle Exit (Stefan Grossman's Guitar Workshop)

=== With Dallas - Ponce ===
- 2016: Down Home Sessions In Argentina

== Video ==
All videos published by Stefan Grossman's Guitar Workshop unless otherwise noted.

- 2003: Stefan Grossman: A Retrospective 1971-1995 DVD (Vestapol)
- 2004: Country Blues Guitar 3 DVD set
- 2004: Fingerpicking Country Blues Guitar: A Repertoire Lesson DVD
- 2004: Fingerpicking Guitar Techniques 2 DVDs
- 2004: Fingerpicking Blues Guitar Solos DVD
- 2004: Advanced Fingerpicking Guitar Techniques DVD
- 2004: Country Blues Guitar In Open Tunings DVD
- 2005: Advanced Fingerpicking Guitar Techniques Blues Guitar DVD
- 2006: How to Play Blues Guitar Lessons 1-3 DVD
- 2007: John Renbourn & Stefan Grossman In Concert 1982 DVD (Vestapol)
- 2008: Folk Blues For Fingerstyle Guitar 2 DVDs
- 2010: Fingerpicking Delights DVD
- 2010: Bottleneck Blues Guitar 2 DVDs (Mel Bay)
- 2010: Atlanta Blues Guitar DVD
- 2010: various artists - Crossroads - Eric Clapton Guitar Festival 2010 DVD, Blu-ray (Rhino) - track 1-15, "Mississippi Blues" and track 1-16, "Roll And Tumble Blues" both tracks with Keb' Mo'
- 2013: Fingerpicking Blues Guitar Arrangements in Vestapol Tuning DVD
- 2014: Guitar Artistry Of Stefan Grossman DVD (Vestapol)
- 2015: Jug Band Music for Fingerstyle Guitar DVD
- 2016: Fingerpicking Guitar in Dropped D Tuning 2 DVDs
- 2017: Buckets of Rain - Fingerpicking Possibilities in Open D DVD
- 2017: Fingerpicking Blues Guitar in the Key of E DVD
- 2017: Beyond Fingerpicking Blues Guitar in the Key of E DVD

== As composer ==
- 1972: Scott Walker - The Moviegoer (Philips) - track 8, "Joe Hill (Theme from Ballad Of Joe Hill)"
- 1974: Sammy Vomáčka - Ragtime Guitar (Stockfisch Records) - track 2, "Katz Rag"
- 2010: various artists - Crossroads - Eric Clapton Guitar Festival 2010 DVD, Blu-ray (Rhino) - track 1-15, "Mississippi Blues" (co-written with Aurora Block); track 1-16, "Roll And Tumble Blues"

== As producer ==
=== 1971 - 1975 ===
- 1971: Reverend Gary Davis - Children Of Zion : Reverend Gary Davis In Concert (Transatlantic)
- 1971: Reverend Gary Davis - Ragtime Guitar (Transatlantic)
- 1971: John James and Pete Berryman - Sky In My Pie (Transatlantic)
- 1973: Ton Van Bergeyk - Famous Ragtime Guitar Solos (Kicking Mule)
- 1974: Reverend Gary Davis - Let Us Get Together (Sonet)
- 1974: Dave Evans - Sad Pig Dance (Kicking Mule)
- 1974: Peter Finger - Bottleneck Guitar Solos (Kicking Mule)
- 1975: Tom Paley - Hard Luck Papa: Old Time Picking Styles and Techniques (Kicking Mule)
- 1975: Leo Wijnkamp Jr. - Rags To Riches (Kicking Mule)
- 1976: David Cohen - How To Play Folk Guitar (Kicking Mule)

=== 1976 - present ===
- 1976: Dave Evans - Take A Bite Out Of Life (Kicking Mule)
- 1976: Ton Van Bergeyk - Guitar Instrumentals To Tickle Your Fingers (Kicking Mule)
- 1976: various artists - Novelty Guitar Instrumentals (Kicking Mule)
- 1977: Duck Baker - When You Wore A Tulip (Kicking Mule)
- 1977: Peter Finger - Acoustic Rock Guitar (Kicking Mule)
- 1978: Davey Graham - The Complete Guitarist (Kicking Mule) - executive producer
- 1978: Sam Mitchell - Follow You Down (Kicking Mule)
- 1979: Davey Graham - Dance For Two People (Kicking Mule)
- 1980: Richard Royal Baker IV - Kid On The Mountain - Irish, Scottish & English Fiddle Tunes For The Fingerpicking Guitarist (Kicking Mule) - executive producer
- 1982: David Tipton - Queen Of China (Kicking Mule) - executive producer
- 2009: Reverend Gary Davis - Live At Gerde's Folk City (Stefan Grossman's Guitar Workshop) - recorded February 3–10, 1962

== As primary artist/song contributor ==
- 1971: various artists - Picture Rags (Transatlantic) - track 3, "Dallas Rag"; track t, "Red Pepper Rag"
- 2006: various artists - The Revenge of Blind Joe Death: The John Fahey Tribute Album (Takoma) - track 14, "Assassination Of John Fahey"

== Also appears on ==
- 1964: The Even Dozen Jug Band - The Even Dozen Jug Band (Elektra) - banjo, guitar, vocals
- 1966: Pat Kilroy - Light Of Day (Elektra) - guitar
- 1970: Mike Cooper - Trout Steel (Dawn) - guitar
- 1972: Paul Simon - Paul Simon (Columbia) - slide guitar on track 10, "Paranoia Blues"
- 1973: McHouston Baker - Mississippi Delta Dues (Blue Star) - guitar
- 1973: Claudio Lolli - Un Uomo in Crisi. Canzoni di Morte, Canzoni di Vita. (Columbia / Emi Italiana) - 6 and 12 string guitar, bottleneck
- 1973: Ole Paus - Blues For Pyttsan Jespersens Pårørende (Polydor) - guitar
- 1976: Marcel Dadi and Friends - Country Show (Guitar World) - guitar

== Sources ==
- Stefan Grossman at AllMusic
- Stefan Grossman discography at Discogs
- Stefan Grossman's Guitar Workshop
