= Duck Baker =

American guitarist (born 1949)

- Born: Richard Royall Baker IV; July 30, 1949 (age 76); Washington, D.C., U.S.
- Genres: Jazz, blues, ragtime, Celtic, swing, dixieland
- Occupation: Musician
- Instrument: Guitar
- Years active: 1972–present
- Labels: Kicking Mule, Acoustic Music, Day Job, Shanachie, Avant
- Website: www.duckbaker.com

Richard Royall "Duck" Baker IV (born July 30, 1949) is an American acoustic fingerstyle guitarist who plays in a variety of styles: jazz, blues, gospel, ragtime, folk, and Irish and Scottish music. He has written many instruction books for guitar.

== Musical career ==
His reputation rests on his work as a solo fingerstyle guitarist in multiple genres: Irish and Scottish music, American folk music, ragtime, gospel, and blues. He was born Richard Royall Baker IV on July 30, 1949, in Washington, D.C., and grew up in Virginia. As a teenager he played in rock bands before becoming interested in acoustic blues and jazz. He listened to the Jazz Crusaders, Jimmy Smith, and Miles Davis, but Misterioso by Thelonious Monk got his attention most at the age of 16. He learned about ragtime from his teacher, stride pianist Buck Evans.

In the early 1970s, he moved to San Francisco and performed a wide range of material, which can be heard on his debut album, There's Something for Everyone in America, on Kicking Mule Records. In addition to developing his solo style, he immersed himself in the local swing jazz and avant-garde jazz scene. He was in a swing guitar duet with Thom Keats and a bluegrass band. From the late 1970s to the middle 1980s, he lived in Europe, spending time among free jazz musicians in London. During these years, he played with Eugene Chadbourne, John Zorn, Henry Kaiser, Woody Mann, and Jim Nichols. He toured throughout the world and released an album of Scottish and Irish music before returning to America in 1987.

== Discography ==
=== As leader ===
- There's Something for Everyone in America (Kicking Mule, 1975)
- When You Wore a Tulip (Kicking Mule, 1975)
- The King of Bongo Bong (Kicking Mule, 1977)
- The Art of Fingerstyle Jazz Guitar (Kicking Mule, 1979)
- The Kid on the Mountain (Kicking Mule, 1980)
- Under Your Heart (Edition Collage, 1985)
- The Salutation (Day Job, 1988)
- A Thousand Words with John Renbourn (Acoustic Music, 1992)
- Opening the Eyes of Love (Shanachie, 1993)
- The Clear Blue Sky (Acoustic Music, 1995)
- Spinning Song: Duck Baker Plays the Music of Herbie Nichols (Avant, 1996)
- Ms. Right (Acoustic Music, 1998)
- My Heart Belongs to Jenny (Day Job, 2000)
- Do You Know What it Means to Miss New Orleans (Day Job, 2005)
- The Ducks Palace (Incus, 2009)
- Everything That Rises Must Converge (Mighty Quinn, 2009)
- The Roots and Branches of American Music (Les Cousins, 2009)
- The County Set (Southern Summer, 2016)
- Outside (Emanem, 2016)
- Shades of Blue (Fuilca, 2017)
- The Preacher’s Son (Fuilca, 2017)
- Pareto Sketches (Barcode Records, 2017)
- Duck Baker Plays Monk (Triple Point, 2017)
- Les Blues Du Richmond: Demos & Outtakes 1973–1979 (Tomkins Square, 2018)
- Plymouth Rock (Fuilca, 2019)
- I’m Coming, Virginia (Fuilca, 2020)
- Not The First Time (Fuilca, 2021)
- Confabulations (ESP-Disk, 2021)
- Wink The Other Eye (Fuilca, 2022)
- Contra Costa Dance (Confront, 2022)

=== As sideman ===
With Eugene Chadbourne

- Guitar Trios (Parachute, 1977)
- Vision-Ease Vol 2 (House of Chadula, 1978)
- Wild Partners (House of Chadula, 1998)

With others

- John James, Descriptive Guitar Instrumentals (Kicking Mule, 1976)
- Stefan Grossman, Thunder on the Run (Kicking Mule, 1980)
- Roswell Rudd, Broad Strokes (Knitting Factory, 2000)

With various artists

- Irish Reels, Jigs, Hornpipes and Airs (Kicking Mule, 1979) (with Dan Ar Braz, Dave Evans, Davey Graham)
- Irish Reels, Jigs, Airs and Hornpipe's: Arranged for Finger Picking Solo Guitar (Shanachie, 1990) (with Dave Evans, Dan Ar Braz)
