= The Kid on the Mountain =

Studio album by Duck Baker
- Released: 1980
- Recorded: 1979
- Studio: Livington Studio, London, England
- Genre: Folk
- Length: 47:09
- Label: Kicking Mule
- Producer: Duck Baker

Duck Baker chronology
The Art of Fingerstyle Jazz Guitar (1979)	The Kid on the Mountain (1980)	Under Your Heart (1985)

The Kid on the Mountain is an album by American guitarist Duck Baker that was released in 1980. It was reissued on CD in 1999 and 2013 with four bonus tracks.

== Reception ==
Professional ratings
Review scores
Source	Rating
Allmusic	4/5 stars

Music critic Alex Henderson, writing for Allmusic, wrote the album "is hardly the work of a Celtic purist. But it's certainly the work of an artist who isn't afraid to take risks, and Baker's chance-taking spirit makes for an interesting, unorthodox project that can hardly be called generic."

== Track listing ==
All songs traditional except where noted.

1. "Medley: The Wicklow Hornpipe/Proudlock's Hornpipe" – 2:21
2. "Blind Mary" – 3:01
3. "The Blarney Pilgrim" – 2:20
4. "Duke of Fife's Welcome to Deeside" – 2:07
5. "Sir Sidney Smith's March" – 3:31
6. "Bantry Bay" – 2:06
7. "Morgan Magan" – 3:27
8. "Kid on the Mountain" – 2:06
9. "Medley: Fanteladda/Boys of Ballisodare" – 3:23
10. "Rights of Man" – 2:47
11. "Elsie Marley" – 1:41
12. "Sheebeg and Sheemore" – 3:18
13. "Lament for Limerick" – 4:48

Reissue bonus tracks:

1. "The March of the King of Laois" (Baker) –2:58
2. "Medley: The South Wind/The Blackbird" – 3:40
3. "No Love" (Baker) –2:00
4. "Mardi Gras Dance" (Baker) – 1:35

== Personnel ==
- Duck Baker – acoustic guitar

Production

- Duck Baker – producer
- Stefan Grossman – executive producer, photography
- Tom Leader – engineer
- Nic Kinsey – engineer
- Malcolm Davies – mastering
- Bob Wagner – design
