= Under the Volcano (disambiguation) =

Under the Volcano is a novel by Malcolm Lowry.

Under the Volcano may also refer to:

- Under the Volcano (1984 film), a 1984 film adaptation of Lowry's novel
- Under the Volcano (2021 film), a 2021 music documentary film
- Under the Volcano (2024 film), a 2024 drama film by Damian Kocur
- Under the Volcano (The Family Rain album), 2014
- Under the Volcano, an album by Rock and Hyde (previously known as Payolas), 1987
- Under the Volcano, an album by Stefan Grossman and John Renbourn, 1979
- Under the Volcano Festival, an annual activist, grassroots gathering in Canada
