= The Art of Fingerstyle Jazz Guitar =

Studio album by Duck Baker
- Released: 1979
- Recorded: Livington Studio, London, England
- Genre: Blues, jazz
- Label: Kicking Mule
- Producer: Stefan Grossman

Duck Baker chronology
King of Bongo Bong (1977)	The Art of Fingerstyle Jazz Guitar (1979)	The Kid on the Mountain (1980)

Alternative Cover
- Cover of the CD reissue

The Art of Fingerstyle Jazz Guitar is an album by American guitarist Duck Baker, released in 1979. It was reissued in 1994 by Shanachie Records with six bonus tracks.

== Reception ==
Professional ratings
Review scores
Source	Rating
AllMusic	4.5/5 stars
MusicHound Folk: The Essential Album Guide	1/5 stars

AllMusic's Richard Foss wrote: "Although it may seem unlikely that Baker alone can do justice to pieces that were written for a full band, his versions of tunes like 'Take the 'A' Train' and 'Stompin' at the Savoy' are surprisingly effective. While the ringing tones may be absent, the warmth and polyrhythms that come from adroit fingerpicking give this recording a warmth and character that is far from the sound-alike herd of flashy fusion guitar players… To put it more succinctly, if you don't have this CD, you probably need it."

== Track listing ==
All tracks are written by Duck Baker except where noted.

No.	Title	Length
1.	"Stompin' at the Savoy" (Benny Goodman/Andy Razaf/Edgar Sampson/Chick Webb)	2:41
2.	"Tintiyana" (Abdullah Ibrahim)	3:30
3.	"Southern Cross"	3:47
4.	"Take the 'A' Train" (Billy Strayhorn)	2:16
5.	"Summertime" (George Gershwin/Ira Gershwin/DuBose Heyward)	3:34
6.	"Everything That Rises Must Converge"	3:58
7.	"White with Foam"	2:08
8.	"Yas Yas"	2:49
9.	"Sweet and Lovely" (Gus Arnheim/Jules LeMare/Harry Tobias)	3:11
10.	"Your Lady" (John Coltrane)	4:36
11.	"Medley:Wishes/Plain as the Winter"	3:57
12.	"Good Intentions"	2:10
13.	"Always" (Irving Berlin)	2:21
14.	"Turnaround" (Ornette Coleman)	2:43
15.	"Immaculate Conception Rag"	2:34
16.	"Black Monk"	1:38
17.	"In a Sentimental Mood" (Duke Ellington/Manny Kurtz/Irving Mills)	3:15
18.	"The Stroll"	1:48
19.	"The Clown"	3:47

== Personnel ==
- Duck Baker – acoustic guitar, liner notes

Production notes:

- Stefan Grossman – producer, photography
- Nic Kinsey – engineer
- John Verity – engineer
- Ron Cosford – photography
