= Blue Horizon =

Blue Horizon may refer to:

== Music ==
- Blue Horizon (Rory Block album) (1983)
- Blue Horizon (Wishbone Ash album) (2014)
- "Blue Horizon" (song), a 1999 song by Farmer's Daughter
- Blue Horizon (record label), a British blues independent record label

== Other uses ==
- The Blue Horizon, a historic boxing venue in Philadelphia
- Blue Horizon (novel), a novel by Wilbur Smith
- Buddleja davidii 'Blue Horizon', a flowering plant cultivar
- Blue Horizon Corporation AG, Venture Capital Firm in Zurich
- Blue Horizon Casino Cruises, An American casino cruise ship company
