= Yazoo Basin Boogie =

Studio album by Stefan Grossman
- Released: 1970
- Recorded: Spring 1969, Winter 1970 in Rome, Italy
- Genre: Folk, blues
- Label: Transatlantic
- Producer: Stefan Grossman

Stefan Grossman chronology
The Ragtime Cowboy Jew (1970)	Yazoo Basin Boogie (1970)	Those Pleasant Days (1971)

Alternative Cover
- Reissue cover

Yazoo Basin Boogie is an album by American guitarist Stefan Grossman, released in 1970. It was reissued on LP in 1974 by Grossman's own label Kicking Mule Records and on CD in 1999 and 2005 by Shanachie Records. It has had various track listings with each reissue. A 1991 reissue with the same title was a compilation including tracks from Yazoo Basin Boogie and Grossman's 1972 release Memphis Jellyroll. The original release was issued with guitar tablature. The track "Adam's Voice" is a child speaking.

== Reception ==
Professional ratings
Review scores
Source	Rating
Allmusic	4.5/5 stars

In his Allmusic review of the compilation release, critic Cub Koda wrote "Grossman has spent so many years producing videos and how to books on acoustic guitar, it's hard to think of him as a guitarist himself, which is why albums like this are so valuable and reassuring. Grossman can back up everything he says and believes musically, with an encyclopedic knowledge and feel for country-blues, rags, and fiddle tunes as demonstrated here... A must-have for folk-blues guitar enthusiasts."

== Track listing ==
There were no track lengths noted on the original LP release.

=== Side one ===
1. "Adam's Voice/Tickle Dew" (Stefan Grossman)
2. "Dallas Rag" (Traditional, arrangement by Dave Laibman)
3. "I'm So Glad" (Skip James)
4. "Katz Rag" (Grossman)
5. "Texas Lemon Flavor" (Grossman)
6. "Sunday Rag" (Grossman)
7. "Pig Town Fling" (Traditional)
8. "Red Pepper Rag" (Traditional)

=== Side two ===
1. "House Carpenter" (Traditional)
2. "Maple Leaf Rag" (Scott Joplin, arrangement by Laibman)
3. "Coloured Aristocracy" (Traditional, arrangement by Laibman)
4. "Slow Blues in C" (Grossman)
5. "Aurora's Powder Rag" (Traditional, arrangement by Aurora Block)
6. "County Line" (Grossman)
7. "Last of Callahan/Dervish Boogie" (Traditional, arrangement by Laibman)
8. "Yazoo Basin Boogie" (Grossman)

== Personnel ==
- Stefan Grossman – guitar

Production

- Stefan Grossman – liner notes, arrangements
- Dave Laibman – arrangements
- Aurora Block – arrangement
- Christina Brown – cover photograph
- Nic Kinsey – remix engineer
