= Bruiser Queen =

Studio album by Cake Like
- Released: 1997
- Genres: Alternative rock, post-punk
- Label: Vapor
- Producers: Craig Wedren, Carl Glanville

Cake Like chronology
Delicious (1994)	Bruiser Queen (1997)	Goodbye, So What (1999)

Bruiser Queen is the second album by the American band Cake Like, released in 1997. The band promoted the album with a UK tour.

== Production ==
The album was produced by Craig Wedren and Carl Glanville. Ric Ocasek had produced "Mr. Fireman", for an earlier EP, and recommended the band to Neil Young, who signed them to his Vapor Records imprint. Kerri Kenney wrote most of the album's lyrics.

== Critical reception ==
Professional ratings
Review scores
Source	Rating
AllMusic	2/5 stars
Robert Christgau	(dud)
The Encyclopedia of Popular Music	3/5 stars
MusicHound Rock: The Essential Album Guide	2.5/5 stars
New Musical Express	7/10 stars
Stereo Review	2/5 stars
The Tampa Tribune	2.5/4 stars

MTV wrote that "Kenney tries to stretch her low, atonally growly voice to perform Sonic Youth's Gordon-like tricks but lacks the attitude and passion behind the vocal." The Washington Post called the album "fairly slick in its minimalist way," writing that "although its style is spare and jittery, Cake Like can be glib, especially when celebrating sex with the traditional heat-seeking of 'Latin Lover' and 'Mr. Fireman'." The Rocket dismissed the album as "dull and colorless post-punk."

The New York Times opined that "with a sound that fits right in with the cool downtown experimental rock scene, and lyrics that blend equal parts unrestrained sarcasm and unbridled emotion, Cake Like proves that in the grown-up world, popular girls can take chances, too." Scripps Howard wrote: "Rising above their sparse, simplistic arrangements—which tend to be of the monochromatic punk/folk variety—[Nina] Hellman and Kenney plow through their weirdly hostile songs like neo-beatniks at a poetry slam." The Evening Standard called Bruiser Queen "upbeat songs about the lonely and the faithless."

AllMusic thought that Cake Like "does manage a few solid tunes, particularly the Teenage Fanclub-style playfulness of 'Lorraine's Car' and the punky 'Pretty New', but overall Bruiser Queen is a botch."

== Track listing ==
No.	Title	Length
1.	"The New Girl"	2:17
2.	"Wendy"	2:19
3.	"Mr. Fireman"	3:10
4.	"Groovy"	2:01
5.	"Latin Lover"	2:39
6.	"Pretty New"	3:40
7.	"Lorraine's Car"	3:26
8.	"Franchise"	2:51
9.	"Cancer"	3:19
10.	"The American Woman"	2:02
11.	"Truck Stop Hussy"	3:24
12.	"Destroyed"	2:28

== Personnel ==
- Nina Hellman – guitar, vocals
- Kerri Kenney – bass, vocals
- Jody Seifert – drums
