= Goodbye, So What =

Studio album by Cake Like
- Released: June 22, 1999
- Genres: Pop, indie rock, noise pop
- Length: 33:35
- Label: Vapor
- Producer: Craig Ross

Cake Like chronology
| Bruiser Queen (1997) | Goodbye, So What (1999) |

Goodbye, So What is the third and final album by the American band Cake Like, released on June 22, 1999. It was their second album for Neil Young's Vapor Records. They supported it with a North American tour.

== Production ==
The album was produced by Craig Ross, who also played steel guitar and keyboards. "Lucky One" is about the survivor of a mass shooting.

== Critical reception ==
Professional ratings
Review scores
| Source | Rating |
|---|---|
| AllMusic | 3/5 stars |
| The Boston Phoenix | 2.5/4 stars |
| Robert Christgau | (dud) |
| The Great Indie Discography | 6/10 |

CMJ New Music Report called the songs "melancholy, sweet-and-sour pop" and "airy and immediately hummable". The Washington Post said that the album "retains the jumpiness of the band's early sound, which is most noticeable in the prominence of singer Kerri Kenney's bass, but producer Craig Ross has tidied up and filled out the sound". The Orange County Register noted that it "finds the group as capable of two-minute blasts of girl-group revisionism ... as it is heavy-heavy sonic squalor." The Boston Phoenix labeled it "an almost classical-sounding noise-pop record."

Salon labeled the album "an undeviating, toned-down version of the harsher side of the Breeders... The amateurish noise-rock of Cake Like's earliest work is gone, but Goodbye, So What still retains some of the artsy dissonance of Bruiser Queen." The New Yorker praised "the clever hooks, witty songwriting, and mean playing." In a retrospective review, AllMusic stated that "Kenney's vocals are misty yet tightly executed, and the harmonies from Nina Hellman are sweet... These women know how to get attention without Courtney Love attitude or Nina Hagen obscurity, and that's what makes Goodbye, So What so refreshing."

== Track listing ==
| No. | Title | Length |
|---|---|---|
| 1. | "Lucky One" |
| 2. | "My Guy" |
| 3. | "Don't Tell" |
| 4. | "Ashley" |
| 5. | "Dead to Me" |
| 6. | "Getaway" |
| 7. | "Superstore" |
| 8. | "Swell" |
| 9. | "Blacked Out and Blue" |
| 10. | "God's Alright" |
| 11. | "Frequent Flyer" |
| 12. | "Miss You" |
