= Prelapse =

Studio album by Prelapse
- Released: September 21, 1999
- Recorded: November 1997
- Genre: Avant-garde
- Length: 49:32
- Label: Avant
- Producer: Prelapse

Professional ratings
Review scores
Source	Rating
Allmusic	?

Prelapse is an album by the Boston-based band of the same name featuring John Zorn. The album was released on the Japanese Avant label in 1999 and features 10 tracks originally written by Zorn for the band Naked City. The band came to Zorn's attention after transcribing several Naked City compositions.

== Track listing ==
1. "Menstrual Mystery Meat" (Wendell) - 0:57
2. "Alarms" (Johnson) - 3:28
3. "Corkscrew" (Zorn) - 0:45
4. "Mintcrumb Rosette" (Hudgins) - 3:30
5. "Slingshot" (Wendell) - 0:55
6. "Blood Sucking Freaks" (Zorn) - 1:26
7. "Screwball" (Zorn) - 0:43
8. "Cold" (Zorn) - 2:54
9. "Message for Alex Part 1" (Lacamoire, Wendell) - 0:52
10. "Lachrym" (Lacamoire) - 3:29
11. "545: Mystery Hole" (Wendell) - 2:29
12. "Leper Sap" (Lacamoire) - 2:32
13. "Spectres of Bird" (Zorn) - 1:00
14. "Basketcase" (Zorn) - 0:39
15. "Fat Neck, No Neck" (Wendell) - 6:14
16. "Message for Alex Part 2" (Lacamoire, Wendell) - 0:47
17. "Drag" (Johnson) - 3:12
18. "Bug Skull" (Zorn) - 0:29
19. "The Shrike" (Zorn) - 1:16
20. "Pools of Urine" (Wendell) - 2:11
21. "Bloodbath" (Zorn) - 0:39
22. "Purged Specimen" (Zorn) - 1:30
23. "Coda" (Zorn) - 0:16

Recorded at B.C. Studio, New York in November 1997

== Personnel ==
- Alex Lacamoire – keyboards
- Gwendolyn Wendell – bass, vocals
- Dane Johnson – guitar
- Andy Sanesi – drums
- Jeff Hudgins – alto, clarinet
- John Zorn (3, 6, 7, 13, 14, 18, 19, 21-23): alto
