= Rhinestones & Steel Strings =

Studio album by Rory Block
- Released: 1984
- Genre: Country blues
- Length: 32:06
- Label: Rounder
- Producer: Rory Block

Rory Block chronology
Blue Horizon (1983)	Rhinestones & Steel Strings (1984)	I've Got a Rock in My Sock (1986)

Professional ratings
Review scores
Source	Rating
AllMusic	4/5 stars
The Penguin Guide to Blues Recordings	3/4 stars

Rhinestones & Steel Strings is a blues album by the American guitarist and singer Rory Block, released in 1984 by Rounder Records.

== Track listing ==
1. "Future Blues" (Brown) 3:07
2. "I Might Find a Way" (Block) 2:57
3. "El Vuelo del Alma (For Edgar)" (Block) 3:25
4. "Lovin' Fool" (Block) 3:31
5. "The Golden Vanity" (traditional) 4:46
6. "Dr. Make It Right" (Block) 3:03
7. "No Way for Me to Get Along" (Wilkins) 3:23
8. "Back to the Woods" (Spands) 2:22
9. "God's Gift to Women" (Block) 2:37
10. "Sit Down on the Banks" (Davis) 3:23
