= Spigot (disambiguation) =

A spigot (or "tap" or "faucet") is a valve for controlling the release of a gas or liquid.

Spigot may also refer to:

- AT-4 Spigot, NATO reporting name for 9K111 Fagot, a Russian anti-tank missile
- Spigot, the male end of a pipe designed to be connected with a spigot and socket joint

- Spigot, a keyed post in the center of some vacuum tube bases

- Spigot, an individual projecting microscopic tube in a spider's spinneret
- Spigot, the nickname of cartoonist Tristan A. Farnon
- Spigot Peak, a mountain in Antarctica
- "Spigot", a song by Marc Ribot from Shrek
- Spigot, a Java-based server API, forked from CraftBukkit, designed for servers on the sandbox game Minecraft

== See also ==
- Spigot algorithm, in mathematics
- Spigot mortar, an artillery weapon
