= There's Something for Everyone in America =

Studio album by Duck Baker
- Released: 1975
- Studio: Blue Bear Studios, San Francisco, California
- Genre: Folk, blues, jazz
- Label: Kicking Mule
- Producer: ED Denson, Dale Miller

Duck Baker chronology
There's Something for Everyone in America (1975)	King of Bongo Bong (1977)

Professional ratings
Review scores
Source	Rating
Allmusic	2/5 stars

There's Something for Everyone in America is the debut album by American guitarist Duck Baker. It was released in 1975 and reissued by Stefan Grossman's Guitar Workshop.

== Track listing ==
1. "The Jackson Stomp" (Traditional)
2. "The Mission Street Blues" (W. C. Handy)
3. "Allegheny County" (Duck Baker, Dan McCorison)
4. "Matty Powell"
5. "Zebra Blues"
6. "Wolverines Blues" (Jelly Roll Morton)
7. "Melancoly Baby"
8. "Take Me Out to the Ball Game/America" (Jack Norworth, Albert Von Tilzer)
9. "Temperance Reel" (Traditional)
10. "The Pineapple Rag"
11. "Hick's Farewell"
12. "Doctor Jazz" (King Oliver)
13. "The Old Folks Polka"
14. "There'll Be a Happy Meeting" (Traditional)
15. "The Wreck of Old 97" (G. B. Grayson, Henry Whitter)

== Personnel ==
- Duck Baker – acoustic guitar

Production notes:

- ED Denson – producer
- Dale Miller – producer
- Mark Needham – engineer
- Nic Kinsey – remix engineer
- Terry Eden – artwork, cover design
