= Confessions of a Blues Singer =

Studio album by Rory Block
- Released: 1998
- Genre: Blues
- Label: Rounder Records

Confessions of a Blues Singer is a blues album by Rory Block. It was released in 1998 through Rounder Records.

== Critical reception ==
Professional ratings
Review scores
Source	Rating
AllMusic	2.5/5 stars
The Penguin Guide to Blues Recordings	3/4 stars

The Chicago Tribune wrote that "the album doesn't rise above its museum-piece feeling until Block closes with two epic originals, 'Mother Marian', a sad profile of an elderly acquaintance, and the autobiographical 'Life Song'."

== Track listing ==
1. "If I Had Possession Over Judgement Day" (Johnson) - 3:05
2. "Ramblin' on My Mind" (Johnson) - 3:18
3. "Kassie Jones" (Lewis) - 4:19
4. "I Am in the Heavenly Way" (White) - 3:09
5. "Statesboro Blues" (McTell) - 2:39
6. "Long Way from Home" (Johnson) - 3:27
7. "Bo Weavil Blues" (Patton) - 3:36
8. "I'll Go with Him" (Wilkins ) - 2:57
9. "Titanic (When That Great Ship went Down)" (Smith, Smith) - 2:12
10. "Silver Slide Moan" (Block) - 0:37
11. "Mother Marian" (Block) - 8:55
12. "Life Song" (Block) - 9:11
