= House of Hearts =

Studio album by Rory Block
- Released: 1987
- Genre: Country blues
- Length: 38:20
- Label: Rounder

Rory Block chronology
I've Got a Rock in My Sock (1986)	House of Hearts (1987)	Mama's Blues (1991)

Professional ratings
Review scores
Source	Rating
AllMusic	3/5 stars

House of Hearts is an album by American blues guitarist and singer Rory Block, released in 1987 on the Rounder Records label. The album is dedicated to Block's son, Thiele David Biehusen, who died in a road accident, aged 20. Biehusen's voice is heard on the telephone answering machine on the title track.

== Track listing ==
All tracks composed by Rory Block unless indicated

1. "Farewell Young Man" 4:06
2. "Heavenly Bird" 4:49
3. "Do You Love Me" 4:05
4. "Morning Bells" 3:46
5. "Gentle Kindness" 1:27
6. "Misty Glen" 3:26
7. "On the Water" 2:34
8. "Bonnie Boy" 4:04
9. "Krye" (Valdina) 1:14
10. "House of Hearts" 9:00
