= Cake Like =

American indie rock band

- Origin: New York
- Genres: Indie rock punk rock
- Years active: 1993–1999
- Label: Vapor Records
- Past members: Kerri Kenney-Silver; Jody Seifert; Nina Hellman

Cake Like was an all-female punk indie rock band based in New York City. Its members were bassist and lead singer Kerri Kenney, drummer Jody Seifert, and vocalist and guitarist Nina Hellman. The band came together in 1993 when Kenney and Hellman met at New York University's Experimental Theater Wing, decided to form a band, and were joined by Hellman's roommate Seifert. The members had never played music before and so developed their own unique style. Their songs often play out like poetry set to erratic guitar-rock. They soon attracted the attention of John Zorn, who signed the band to his Avant Records label, which released their first LP. Ric Ocasek, formerly of The Cars, produced their follow-up EP. Subsequently, Neil Young signed the band to his Vapor Records label, which released their second and third LPs.

The band dissolved in 1999 when Kenney relocated to Los Angeles. However, on her appearance on "The JV Club" podcast, Kenney stated that the group still owes Vapor Records another album, saying "I like that it's out there, floating around that maybe some day we would."

Kenney, now known as Kerri Kenney-Silver, is an actress and comedian known for her work in such series as The State, The Ellen Show, and Reno 911! Nina Hellman is also an actress and works in the theatre in New York and appeared in the film Wet Hot American Summer, as well as providing voices for several episodes of The Venture Bros. Seifert works in the fashion industry.

Cake Like also appears in a deleted sketch for The State entitled "The Muskrats". The band is featured at the end, playing the school's "fighting song". The sketch was released on The State DVD box-set in 2009.

== Discography ==
- Delicious (1994)
- Bruiser Queen (1997)
- Goodbye, So What (1999)
