= Avant Records =

- Founded: 1992
- Founder: John Zorn; Kazunori Sugiyama
- Defunct: 2004
- Status: Defunct
- Distributor(s): DIW, Disk Union (physical)
- Genre: Avant-garde jazz, free improvisation, experimental
- Country of origin: Japan
- Location: Chiyoda, Tokyo

Avant Records was a record label in Japan that specialized in avant-garde jazz, avant rock, and experimental music. The label released more than 80 albums between 1992 and 2004.

== History ==
New York saxophonist John Zorn was signed to Nonesuch, but his band Naked City recorded music that required a different label. He started Avant in 1992 as a division of DIW/Disk Union in Japan and produced its first albums.

The label's roster included Derek Bailey, Duck Baker, Cyro Baptista, Joey Baron, Steve Beresford, Anthony Coleman, Sylvie Courvoisier, Dave Douglas, Mark Feldman, Erik Friedlander, Wayne Horvitz, Joe Maneri, Misha Mengelberg, William Parker, Bobby Previte, and Min Xiao-Fen.

In 1995 Zorn and Kazunori Sugiyama started Tzadik Records in New York as a vehicle for Zorn's albums and for musicians who recorded for Avant.

== Discography ==
- Avan 001: Naked City – Heretic
- Avan 002: Naked City – Grand Guignol
- Avan 003: Naked City – Radio
- Avan 004: Naked City – Absinthe
- Avan 005: Various Artists – In His Own Sweet Way: A Tribute to Dave Brubeck
- Avan 006: DNA – DNA (Last Live at CBGB's)
- Avan 007: Buckethead – Bucketheadland
- Avan 008: Fushitsusha – Allegorical Misunderstanding
- Avan 009: Anton Fier – Dreamspeed
- Avan 010: Blind Idiot God – Cyclotron
- Avan 011: Anthony Coleman – Disco by Night
- Avan 012: Peter Garland – Nana & Victorio
- Avan 013: David Shea – Shock Corridor
- Avan 014: George E. Lewis – Voyager
- Avan 015: Lee Hyla – In Double Light
- Avan 016: John Oswald – Plexure
- Avan 017: Rough Assemblage – Construction and Demolition
- Avan 018: Zeena Parkins – Isabelle
- Avan 019: Dave Soldier – SMUT
- Avan 020: David Weinstein – Perfume
- Avan 021: Min Xiaofen – With Six Composers
- Avan 022: Stephen Drury – Faith, The Loss of Faith, and the Return of Faith
- Avan 023: Romero Lubambo – Lubambo
- Avan 024: John French – O Solo Drumbo
- Avan 025: Naked City – Radio, Vol. 2 (Never Recorded)
- Avan 026: Boredoms – Wow 2
- Avan 027: Pigpen – V as in Victim
- Avan 028: James Plotkin – The Joy of Disease
- Avan 029: Cake Like – Delicious
- Avan 030: Ikue Mori – Painted Desert
- Avan 031: Various – Disco Bhangra: Wedding Bands From Rajasthan
- Avan 032: God Is My Co-Pilot – Mir Shlufn Nisht
- Avan 033: Marc Ribot – Shrek
- Avan 034: Z'EV – Heads & Tales
- Avan 035: Ben Goldberg – Twelve Minor
- Avan 036: Bobby Previte's Empty Suits – Slay the Suitors
- Avan 037: Phillip Johnston's Big Trouble – The Unknown
- Avan 038: Misha Mengelberg Trio – Who's Bridge
- Avan 039: Steve Beresford – Signals for Tea
- Avan 040: Duck Baker – Spinning Song: Duck Baker Plays the Music of Herbie Nichols
- Avan 041: Bob Ostertag – Fear No Love
- Avan 042: Chris Cochrane – Bath
- Avan 043: Weird Little Boy – Weird Little Boy
- Avan 044: Eugene Chadbourne – Pain Pen
- Avan 045: Jenny Scheinman Quartet – Live at Yoshi's
- Avan 046: Liu Sola & Wu Man – China Collage
- Avan 047: Smarnamisa! – Resia Valley Music
- Avan 048: Andy Haas – Arnhem Land
- Avan 049: Makigami Koichi – John Zorn's Cobra: Tokyo Operations '94
- Avan 050: Derek Bailey & Min Xiao–Fen – Viper
- Avan 051: Dim Sum Clip Job – Harmolodic Jeopardy
- Avan 052: Jad Fair & The Shapir–O'Rama – We Are The Rage
- Avan 053: Prelapse – Prelapse
- Avan 054: Pieces – I Need 5 Minutes Alone
- Avan 055: Larval – Larval
- Avan 056: Derek Bailey/John Zorn/William Parker – Harras
- Avan 057: Erik Friedlander – Chimera
- Avan 058: Arcado String Trio – Live in Europe
- Avan 059: Joey Baron & Barondown – Crackshot
- Avan 060: Derek Bailey – Guitar, Drums N Bass
- Avan 061: Cyro Baptista – Vira Loucos
- Avan 062: Drums of Death
- Avan 063: Bernard Woma – Live at the Pito Bar
- Avan 064: Abdulai Bangoura – Sigiri
- Avan 065: Mark Feldman & Sylvie Courvoisier – Music for Violin and Piano
- Avan 066: Dave Douglas – Sanctuary
- Avan 067: Joe Maneri – Paniots Nine
- Avan 068: Jamie Saft/Cuong Vu – Ragged Jack
- Avan 069: Bruce Ackley – The Hearing
- Avan 070: Marie McAuliffe – Plays the Music of Burt Bacharach
- Avan 071: Whistling Hangmen – Barhopping
- Avan 072: Alva – Fair-Haired Guilletine
- Avan 073: EasSide Percussion – ESP
- Avan 074: Keiji Haino– An Unclear Trial: More Than This
- Avan 075: Dragon Blue – Hades Park
- Avan 076: Dying Ground – Dying Ground
- Avan 077: David Watson – Skirl
- Avan 078: Harriet Tubman – Prototype (2000)
- Avan 079: Vivian Sisters – Vivian Sisters
- Avan 080: Wayne Horvitz Four Plus One Ensemble – From a Window
- Avan 081: Bill Laswell vs. Submerged (DJ) – Brutal Calling
