= High Heeled Blues =

Studio album by Rory Block
- Released: 1981
- Recorded: at Bearsville Sound Studio
- Genre: Country blues
- Length: 30:46
- Label: Rounder
- Producer: John Sebastian

Rory Block chronology
How to Play the Blues Guitar (1978)	High Heeled Blues (1981)	Blue Horizon (1983)

Professional ratings
Review scores
Source	Rating
Allmusic	4.5/5 stars
The Penguin Guide to Blues Recordings	3/4 stars

High Heeled Blues is a blues album by the American guitarist and singer Rory Block. Produced by John Sebastian and released in 1981 through Rounder Records, it included a number of tracks that took Block back to the classical blues form with which she began her career – including three compositions by Robert Johnson, one by Skip James, and a number first popularized by Bessie Smith ("Down in the Dumps"). Other songs move in a more modern direction, incorporating elements of pop, country, and gospel.

== CD Track listing ==
All tracks are written by Rory Block, except where noted

No.	Title	Writer(s)	Length
1.	"Walking Blues"	Johnson	2:20
2.	"Travelin' Blues"	Delaney, Johnson	2:43
3.	"Got To Have You Be My Man"		2:15
4.	"Devil Got My Man"	James	2:20
5.	"Down in the Dumps"	Wesley Wilson, Leola P. Wilson	2:58
6.	"The Water is Wide"	Traditional	3:29
7.	"Since You Been Gone"		2:13
8.	"Cross Road Blues"	Johnson	2:26
9.	"Achin' Heart"		2:16
10.	"Hilarity Rag"	Traditional	2:01
11.	"Kind Hearted Man"	Johnson	3:12
12.	"Uncloudy Day"	Alwood	2:33

== Personnel ==
- Rory Block – lead vocals, acoustic guitars, harmonium on "Got to Have You Be My Man"
- John Sebastian – harmonica, electric baritone guitar
- Robb Goldstein – hammered dulcimer
- Warren Bernhardt – piano, harmonium

Production

- Rory Block and John Sebastian – production
- Shep Siegel – engineering
- John Sebastian – liner notes
