= Spinning Song: Duck Baker Plays the Music of Herbie Nichols =

Studio album by Duck Baker
- Released: 1996
- Recorded: October 14, 1995–January 6, 1996
- Genre: Blues, jazz
- Length: 40:35
- Label: Avant
- Producer: John Zorn, Kazunori Sugiyama

Duck Baker chronology
The Clear Blue Sky (1995)	Spinning Song: Duck Baker Plays the Music of Herbie Nichols (1996)	Northern Skies, Southern Blues (1997)

Spinning Song: Duck Baker Plays the Music of Herbie Nichols is an album by American guitarist Duck Baker, released in 1996. It was reissued in 2002.

The album consists of songs written by American jazz pianist and composer Herbie Nichols who wrote the standard "Lady Sings the Blues".

== Reception ==
Professional ratings
Review scores
Source	Rating
Allmusic	4/5 stars

Music critic William York, writing for Allmusic, wrote of the album: "Nichols' compositions have their own sort of ambiguous, hard-to-pin-down harmonic aroma, filled with subtle harmonic twists and soft dissonances, but Baker somehow captures it in these versions even when he detours from the originals. He swings naturally and effortlessly when he wants, but he also takes things outside and gets abstract in his own quiet way... this album is a fine piece of work, one with the same type of subtlety and deceptive-sounding ease for which Nichols was/is known."

== Track listing ==
All tracks composed by Herbie Nichols.

1. "The Third World" – 4:02
2. "The Happenings" – 4:34
3. "Lady Sings the Blues" – 5:16
4. "Nick at T's" – 4:46
5. "House Party Starting" – 5:21
6. "2300 Skiddoo" – 4:00
7. "Portrait of Ucha" – 4:06
8. "134th St." – 3:46
9. "Spinning Song" – 4:47

== Personnel ==
- Duck Baker – acoustic guitar

Production

- John Zorn – producer
- Kazunori Sugiyama – producer
- Don Sternecker – engineer
- Allan Tucker – mastering
- Francis Wolff – photography
- Ikue Mori – design
