= I've Got a Rock in My Sock =

Studio album by Rory Block
- Released: 1986
- Genre: Blues
- Length: 32:05
- Label: Rounder
- Producer: Rory Block; Carey Williams, Jr.

Rory Block chronology
| Rhinestones & Steel Strings (1984) | I've Got a Rock in My Sock (1986) | House of Hearts (1987) |

I've Got a Rock in My Sock is a blues album by American blues guitarist and singer Rory Block, released in 1986 by Rounder Records. Taj Mahal and Stevie Wonder contributed to the album. "Moon's Goin' Down" is a cover of the Charlie Patton song.

== Critical reception ==
Professional ratings
Review scores
| Source | Rating |
|---|---|
| AllMusic | 2/5 stars |
| The Penguin Guide to Blues Recordings | 3/4 stars |

The Atlanta Journal-Constitution wrote that Block "may lack the soul and intensity of the late Janis Joplin, but the lady can sing some blues-based pop."

== Track listing ==
1. "Send the Man Back Home" (Block) 3:33
2. "Moon's Goin' Down" (Patton) – 3:25
3. "Gypsie Boy" (Block) – 5:19
4. "I've Got a Rock in My Sock" (Block) – 3:01
5. "Foreign Lander" (Traditional) – 0:45
6. "Goin' Back to the Country" (Block) – 4:27
7. "M and O Blues" (Brown) – 3:23
8. "Lovin' Whiskey" (Block) – 4:06
9. "Highland Overture" (Block) – 4:28
