= Catfish Keith =

American singer-songwriter (born 1962)

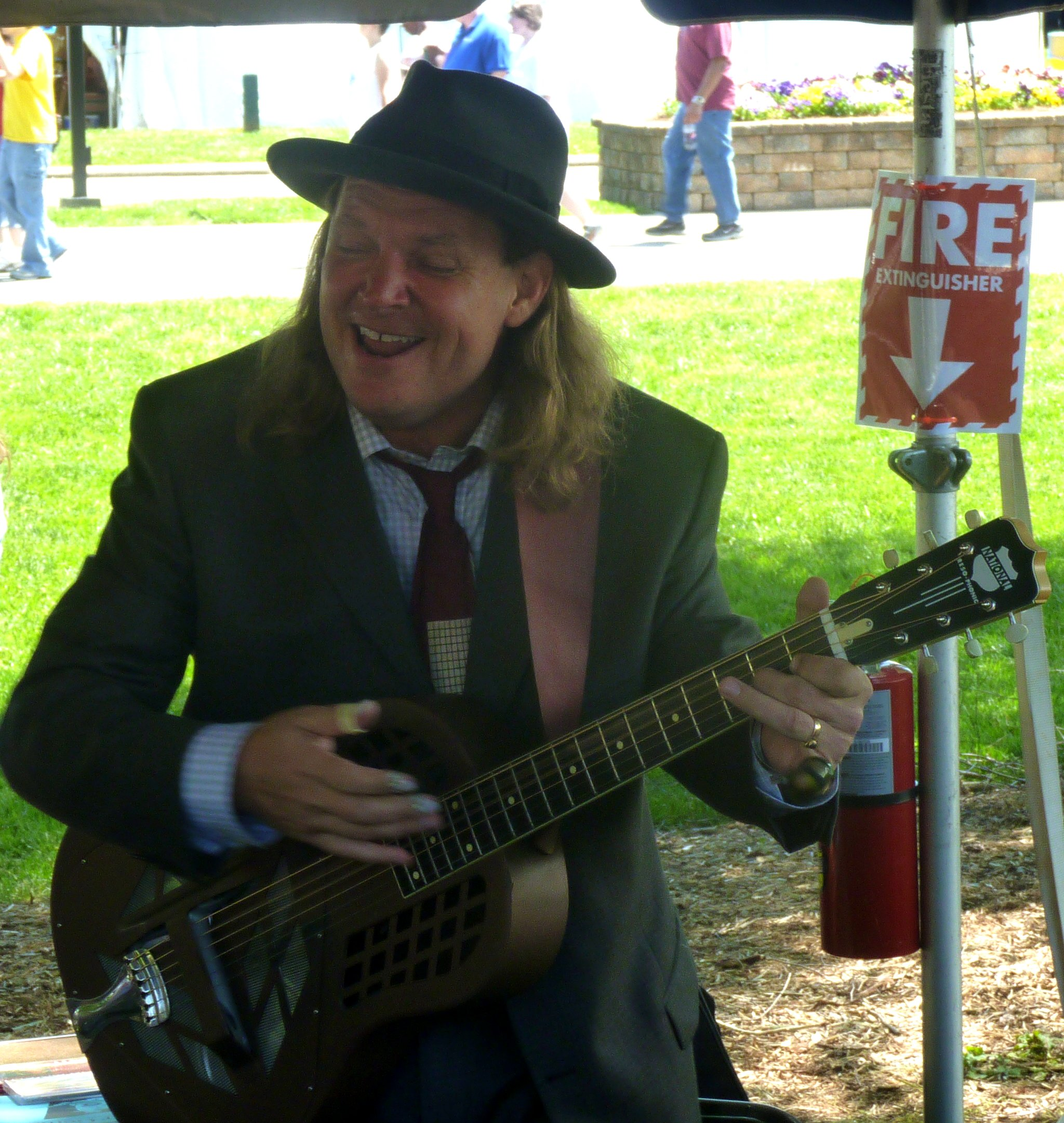
- Pickin' tent MerleFest 2011

Background information
- Born: Keith Daniel Kozacik; February 9, 1962 (age 63); East Chicago, Indiana, United States
- Genres: Blues
- Occupations: Singer, guitarist, songwriter
- Instrument: Steel guitar
- Years active: 1980s–present
- Labels: Fish Tail Records, various
- Website: catfishkeith.com

Catfish Keith (born February 9, 1962) is an American acoustic blues singer-songwriter and guitarist. He is best known as an exponent of the resonator guitar. He has released several solo albums, including 2001's A Fist Full of Riffs.

The Guardian described him as "a solo revelation" who was "breaking new ground for blues. Twice a Blues Music Award nominee for 'Best Acoustic Blues Album', he has had ten number one independent radio chart hit albums.

== Early life and career ==
Catfish Keith was born Keith Daniel Kozacik in East Chicago, Indiana, and was first inspired by blues music he heard on the radio. These included songs by Buddy Guy, Howlin' Wolf and Muddy Waters, although by the time he owned a guitar in his teenage years, he listened mostly to Son House. He attended high school in Davenport, Iowa, before setting out across the United States and beyond learning to sing and play his brand of the blues. He traveled to the Caribbean, where his musical education benefited from hearing Joseph Spence.

His stage name originated from a diving partner in the Virgin Islands who, having seen his efforts at swimming, nicknamed him "Catfish-Swimmin'-Around," and "Catfish-Steel-Guitar-Man." Catfish Keith had his debut album, Catfish Blues (1984), released by Kicking Mule Records. He continued to tour constantly and picked up playing tips from watching Jessie Mae Hemphill, Henry Townsend, Johnny Shines and David "Honeyboy" Edwards.

Keith married in 1988 and founded his own record label, Fish Tail Records. 1991's Pepper in My Shoe sparked global interest in his work, and he toured both Europe and the United States. He appeared on the cover pages of the publications Blues Life, Blueprint, Block and The Guardian, and his follow-up effort, Jitterbug Swing was nominated for a Blues Music Award. Further acclaim was afforded by the British magazine, Blues Connection, who named him "the new slide king of the National steel guitar."

Cherry Ball (1993) saw Dirty Linen's James Jensen state "Catfish will give you goose bumps and leave you howling for more!" A further Blues Music Award nomination was generated by the release of Fresh Catfish in 1995.

After Twist It Babe!, his next release was Pony Run (1999). Sweet Pea (2005) was praised by Living Blues who opined "the guitar playing is surely the main attraction here, and "Blotted Out My Mind" alone earns Catfish comparison to Frank Hovington, Elizabeth Cotten, and other virtuoso six-stringers."

In 2008, Keith was inducted into the Iowa Blues Hall of Fame.

He is an endorser of National Reso-Phonic Guitars. Catfish Keith has issued an instructional DVD entitled Dynamic Country Blues Guitar.

In 2019, his album, Reefer Hound: Viper Songs Revisited, won Acoustic Album of the Year honors at the Blues Blast Music Awards.

== Discography ==
Year	Title	Record label
1984	Catfish Blues	Kicking Mule Records
1991	Pepper in My Shoe	Orchard Records
1992	Jitterbug Swing	Orchard Records
1993	Cherry Ball	Fish Tail Records
1995	Fresh Catfish	Orchard Records
1997	Twist It Babe!	Orchard Records
1999	Pony Run	Orchard Records
2001	A Fist Full of Riffs	Solid Air Records
2003	Rolling Sea	Fish Tail Records
2005	Sweet Pea	Fish Tail Records
2007	If I Could Holler	Fish Tail Records
2008	Live at the Half Moon	CD Baby
2011	A True Friend is Hard To Hard – A Gospel Retrospective	CD Baby
2011	Put on a Buzz	CD Baby
2013	Honey Hole	Fish Tail Records
2017	Mississippi River Blues	Fish Tail Records
2018	Reefer Hound: Viper Songs Revisited	Fish Tail Records
2019	Catfish Crawl	Fish Tail Records
2020	Blues at Midnight	Fish Tail Records
2024	Shake Me Up	CD Baby

== See also ==
- List of electric blues musicians
- List of people from Indiana
- List of singer-songwriters
- List of slide guitarists
- Music of Indiana
