= The Lady and Mr. Johnson =

Studio album by Rory Block
- Released: 15 August 2006
- Genre: Blues, Acoustic Blues
- Length: 40:52
- Label: Rykodisc
- Producer: Rory Block & Rob Davis

The Lady and Mr. Johnson is a blues album by Rory Block consisting of songs written by Robert Johnson. It was released on 15 August 2006, through Rykodisc.

PopMatters rated the album eight out of ten.

== Track listing ==
1. "Cross Road Blues" (Johnson) – 3:19
2. "Preaching Blues (Up Jumped the Devil)" (Johnson) – 3:04
3. "Milkcow's Calf Blues" (Johnson) – 2:29
4. "Walking Blues" (Johnson) – 2:44
5. "32-20 Blues" (Johnson) – 4:15
6. "Rambling on My Mind" (Johnson) – 2:59
7. "Terraplane Blues" (Johnson) – 3:21
8. "Me and the Devil Blues" (Johnson) – 3:17
9. "Last Fair Deal Gone Down" (Johnson) – 3:22
10. "Come in My Kitchen" (Johnson) – 3:09
11. "Hellhound on My Trail" (Johnson) – 2:48
12. "If I Had Possession over Judgement Day" (Johnson) – 2:49
13. "Kind Hearted Woman Blues" (Johnson) – 3:11
