= Vestapol =

Vestapol is a music publishing company with over 100 DVDs and videos published as of 2004. It has been releasing videos since the 1960s, mainly featuring jazz, blues, country and folk music artists. The video line is produced by Stefan Grossman. Artists who have recorded on Vestapol video include Merle Travis, Joe Pass, Pat Kirtley, Norman Blake, Preston Reed, and Raymond Fairchild. The name Vestapol refers to an open D Major tuning for the guitar, common in finger-style guitar in country and folk music.

Grossman also began to acquire concert footage of the old blues and country artists who had been rediscovered in the 1960s and had often made TV appearances; this was the basis of Vestapol Videos, which edited and reissued this footage. It was a breakthrough for younger guitarists to be able to watch Big Bill Broonzy, Lightnin' Hopkins, Reverend Gary Davis and many others long after these players had died. Vestapol rapidly expanded to include concert footage from living artists too. Although originally issued as video tapes, almost all of this material (both instructional and concert) has in the last few years been re-issued on DVD and online. The Guitar Workshop mails worldwide from its bases in New Jersey and Yorkshire.
