= Blue Horizon (Rory Block album) =

Studio album by Rory Block
- Released: 1983
- Genre: Country blues
- Length: 36:09
- Label: Rounder

Rory Block chronology
High Heeled Blues (1981)	Blue Horizon (1983)	Rhinestones & Steel Strings (1984)

Professional ratings
Review scores
Source	Rating
AllMusic	2.5/5 stars
The Penguin Guide to Blues Recordings	3/4 stars

Blue Horizon is a blues album by American blues guitarist and singer Rory Block, it was released on 1983 by Rounder Records.

== Track listing ==
1. "Love My Blues Away" (Block) – 2:56
2. "Elder Green Is Gone" (Traditional) – 2:42
3. "Just Like a Man" (Block) – 3:34
4. "Swing Low" (Traditional) – 3:02
5. "Ecstasy" (Block) – 4:49
6. "Feel Just Like Goin' On" (Davis) – 2:12
7. "Ain't No Way to Do" (Block) – 3:53
8. "Frankie and Albert" (Traditional) – 2:29
9. "No Place Like Home" (Block) – 4:52
10. "Catastrophe Rag" (Block) – 2:33
11. "Midnight Light" (Block) – 3:21
