= Kicking Mule Records =

Defunct American record label

- Parent company: Concord Music Group; Ace Records (UK)
- Founded: 1972
- Founder: Stefan Grossman; ED Denson
- Defunct: 2004
- Status: Defunct
- Distributor(s): Concord
- Genre: Country blues, fingerstyle guitar, old-time, bluegrass
- Country of origin: U.S.
- Location: Beverly Hills, California

Kicking Mule Records was an American independent record label, founded in Berkeley, California in 1971 by guitarist Stefan Grossman and Eugene "ED" Denson, formerly co-owner of Takoma Records. The company's name comes from the country blues sexual two-timing allegory "there's another mule kicking in your stall".

During the 1970s, the company did much to popularize solo fingerpicking guitar, expanding the style with recordings of Scott Joplin rags, Beatles hits, big band tunes, and Turlough Carolan harp tunes. The label also released several similarly-styled banjo records.

In the 1980s, Grossman left the label and Denson branched out to include many dulcimer releases as well as recordings by Charlie Musselwhite and Michael Bloomfield. In the early 1990s, Fantasy Records bought both Takoma and Kicking Mule from Denson and soon began to re-release selected LPs on CD. In 2004, all of Fantasy's labels were purchased by Concord Records which was renamed them as the Concord Music Group. A few of the Kicking Mule titles were reissued by Intersound, and a few others were retained by Grossman and reissued by Shanachie Records.

Kicking Mule is handled by Ace Records.

== Catalog ==
=== 100 series - fingerpicking guitar ===
No.	Artist(s)	Title	Date	Notes
101	Reverend Gary Davis	Children of Zion: Rev. Gary Davis in Concert	1974 (rec. 1966)	guitar & vocals
102	Stefan Grossman	Yazoo Basin Boogie	1974 (rec. 1970)	guitar solos
103	Bob Hadley	Tunes from the Well	1976	guitar solos
104	Roy Book Binder, Reverend Gary Davis, Stefan Grossman, Woody Mann, Larry Sandberg	Some People Who Play Guitar... Like A Lotta People Don't!	1974	guitar & vocals
105	Stefan Grossman	Acoustic Music for the Body and Soul	1974 (rec. 1969)	guitar & vocals
106	Reverend Gary Davis	Ragtime Guitar	1974 (rec. 1962-70)	guitar solos
107	Tom Gilfellon, Tony Marcus, Woody Mann, Dale Miller, Dave Laibman, Eric Schoenberg, Leo Wijnkamp	Contemporary Ragtime Guitar	1974	solos
108	Art Rosenbaum	Five String Banjo	1974 (rec. 1973)	later moved to KM 208
108	John James	Live In Concert	1978	Kicking Mule re-used #KM 108
109	Stefan Grossman, Aurora Block	How To Play The Blues Guitar	1979 (rec. 1966)	
110	Happy Traum	Relax Your Mind	1975	guitar & vocals
111	Nick Katzman & Ruby Green	Mississippi River Bottom Blues	1975	guitar & vocals
112	Stefan Grossman	Fingerpicking Guitar Techniques	1974	guitar
113	Bob Hadley	The Raven	1975 (rec. 1973)	guitar solos
114	Ton Van Bergeyk	Famous Ragtime Guitar Solos	1975 (rec. 1974)	guitar solos
115	Stefan Grossman & Ton Van Bergeyk	How To Play Ragtime Guitar	1975	guitar solos
116	Peter Finger	Bottleneck Guitar Solos	1973	guitar solos (performed on homemade guitars)
117	Leo Wijnkamp	Rags to Riches	1975	guitar solos
118	Stefan Grossman	Memphis Jellyroll	1974	guitar solos
119	David Cohen	How To Play Folk Guitar	1976	guitar & vocals
120	Dave Evans	Sad Pig Dance	1974	guitar solos
121	Stefan Grossman	Bottleneck Serenade	1975	guitar solos
122	Bob Evans, Jim McLennan, Ton Van Bergeyk, Dick Fegy, Dave Laibman, Tim Nicolai	The Entertainer - Scott Joplin Rags	1975	guitar
123	Dale Miller	Finger Picking Rags & Other Delights	1975	guitar solos
124	Duck Baker	There's Something for Everyone in America	1975	guitar & vocals
125	Ton Van Bergeyk	Guitar Instrumentals to Tickle Your Fingers	1975	guitar solos
126	George Gritzbach	Have You Had Your Gritz Today?	1976	guitar & vocals
127	Bob Evans, Jim McLennan, Ton Van Bergeyk, Dick Fegy, Dave Laibman, Tim Nicolai, Lasse Johansson, Claes Palmqvist	Novelty Guitar Instrumentals	1976	guitar solos
128	Eric Schoenberg, Rick Maedler, Eric Park, Dave Auer, Flip Breskin, Julie Sakahara, Cliff Perry, Molly & James Mason, Jack Hansen, Peter Schwimmer	The Puget Sound Guitar Workshop	1977	guitar solos
129	Sam Mitchell	Bottleneck/Slide guitar	1976	guitar solos
130	Lasse Johansson & Claes Palmqvist	Ragtime Guitar Duets	1977	guitar duets
131	Stefan Grossman & His Feet	Hot Dogs!	1972	guitars, vocals, tuba, bass, etc.
132	Ton Van Bergeyk, Dale Miller, John James, Sam Mitchell	I Got Rhythm	1976	guitar solos
133	Woody Harris	After Dinner Mints	1977	guitar instrumentals
134	Dave Evans	Take A Bite Out Of Life	1976	guitar solos
135	Duck Baker	When You Wore A Tulip	1977	guitar solos
136	Bob Baxter	Fingerpickin' Blues	1977	guitar solos
137	Dale Miller	Guitarist's Choice	1977	guitar solos
138	Davey Graham	The Complete Guitarist	1978	guitar & vocals
139	Greg Brown	Serious Men Are Running Our World	1978	
139	Gill Burns, Wendy Grossman, Margo Random, Janet Smith, Lynn Clayton	Women's Guitar Workshop	1978	
140	Mickey Baker & The Alex Sanders Funk Time Band	Jazz Rock Guitar	1978	
141	Duck Baker, Davey Graham, Mike Cooper, Sam Mitchell, Tom Paley	Blues Guitar Workshop	1979	
142	Mickey Baker	Blues and Jazz Guitar	1977	
143	John James	Descriptive Guitar Instrumentals	1977	guitar solos
144	Duck Baker	The King of Bongo Bong	1977	guitar solos
145	Stefan Grossman, Jo Ann Kelly, Son House, Mike Cooper, Sam Mitchell, Paul Rowan	Country Blues Guitar Festival	1979	guitar & vocals
146	Lasse Johansson, Claes Palmqvist, Tim Nicolai, Ton Van Bergeyk, Duck Baker	Masters of the Ragtime Guitar: Echoes from the Snowball Club	1977	guitar solos/duets
147	Duck Baker, Lasse Johansson, Claes Palmqvist, Ton Engels, John James, Tim Nicolai	Advanced Fingerpicking Guitar Techniques: School of Ragtime (10 Classic Rags for Guitar by Scott Joplin)	1977	guitar solos/duets
148	Art Thieme	Songs of the Heartland	1980	guitar solos
149	Peter Finger	Acoustic Rock Guitar: The Elf King	1978	guitar solos
150	Art Thieme	Outright Bold-Faced Lies	1978	guitar solos
151	Stefan Grossman, JoAnn Kelly, Sam Mitchell, Mike Cooper	How To Play The Blues Guitar, Vol. 2	1979	guitar & vocals
152	Stefan Grossman & John Renbourn	Stefan Grossman & John Renbourn	1977	guitar duets
153	David Bennett Cohen	Rock n' Roll Guitar	1977	guitar solos
154	Duck Baker, Dave Evans, Leo Wijnkamp Jr., Jim MacLennan	Contemporary Guitar Workshop	1977	guitar solos
155	Dale Miller	Fingers, Don't Fail Me Now	1980	guitar solos
156	Duck Baker	The Art of Fingerstyle Jazz Guitar	1980	guitar solos
157	Davey Graham, Duck Baker, Dave Evans & Dan Ar Bras	Irish Reels, Jigs, Hornpipes & Airs	1980 (rec. 1975)	
158	Bob Hadley, Arvid Smith, Stephen Connolly, Woody Harris	A Tribute to John Fahey	1979	guitar solos
159	Woody Harris	Show of Hands	1979	guitar solos
160	Leo Wijnkamp Jr.	The Return of Dr. Hackenbush	1980	guitar solos
161	Davey Graham	Dance for Two People	1980	
162	Stefan Grossman & John Renbourn	Under The Volcano	1979	guitar duets
163	John Renbourn	The Black Balloon	1979	guitar solos
164	Michael Bloomfield & Woody Harris	Gospel Guitar Duets	1979	guitar duets
165	Robert Stanton	Guitar Poetry	1980	guitar solos
166	Michael Bloomfield	The Lost Works	1980	guitar solos
167	Nick Katzman & Ruby Green	Sparkling Ragtime & Hardbitten Blues	1980	guitar & vocals
168	Ton Van Bergeyk	Lulu's Back in Town: Hot Guitar Solos	1980	guitar solos
169	Duck Baker	The Kid on the Mountain	1980	guitar solos
170	Lasse Johansson	King Porter Stomp: The Music of Jelly Roll Morton Arranged for Guitar	1980	guitar
171	Stefan Grossman	Thunder on the Run	1980	guitar solos
172	Bob Hadley	On the Trail of the Questing Beast: Fantasias for Guitar	1980	guitar solos
173	Bob Brozman	Blue Hula Stomp	1981	guitar solos
174	Seth Austen	Appalachian Fiddle Tunes for Finger Style Guitar	1982	guitar solos
175	Chris Proctor	Runoff	1982	guitar solos
176	Tom Ball & Kenny Sultan	Who Drank My Beer?	1983	guitar & harmonica duets
177	Dave Van Ronk	Your Basic Dave Van Ronk	1983	guitar & vocals
178	Sam Weis	Hologram	1984	guitar solos
179	Catfish Keith	Catfish Blues	1985	guitar solos
180	Scott Appel	Glassfinger	1985	guitar solos
181	Seth Austen	Christmas Day in the Morning	1984	guitar solos
182	Ed Sweeney	Scratching the Surface	1986	guitar solos
183	Seth Austen	Circles	1987	guitar solos
184	Andy Drake	Woodwork	1987	guitar solos
185	Tom Ball	Guitar Music	1987	guitar solos
186	Brian Wendt	Images for Solo Guitar	1988	guitar solos
187	Ed Sweeney	Inside Fezziwigs: The Spirit of Christmas Past	1988	

=== 200 series - other stringed instruments ===
201	Tom Paley	Hard Luck Papa: Old Time Picking Styles and Techniques	1976	banjo solos
202	John Burke accompanied by The Old Hat Band	Fancy Pickin' & Plain Singing	1977	banjo & vocals
203	Art Rosenbaum	The Art of the Mountain Banjo	1978	banjo solos
204	Tommy Thompson, Buell Kazee, Ola Belle Reed, John Burke, Dan Gellert, Pat Dunford, Bob Winans, Buzz Fountain, Shorty Ralph Reynolds, Reed Martin	The Old-Time Banjo in America	1978	banjo solos
205	The Delaware Water Gap	From the Rivers of Babylon to the Land of Jazz	1978	string band
206	Richard Lieberson & The Central Park Sheiks, Michael Auman, Dick Fegy, Tom Gilfellon, Eric Thompson, David Bromberg	Flatpicking Guitar Festival	1976	guitar solos
207	Fred Sokolow	Bluegrass Banjo Inventions	1977	banjo solos
208	Art Rosenbaum	Five String Banjo	1978 (rec. 1974	banjo solos, moved from KM108
209	Andy Cahan, Ken Perlman, Henry Sapoznik, Bob Carlin, Dana Loomis	Melodic Clawhammer Banjo	1976	banjo solos
210	Dan Crary, Dick Fegy, Eric Thompson, Barry Solomon, Steve Kaufman	Flatpicking Guitar Festival, Vol. 2	1980	guitar solos
211	Clark Buehling, Steve Moore, Henry Sapoznik	Banjo Gems: Solos, Duets, Trios	1980	banjo solos/duets/trios
212	Fred Sokolow	Ragtime Banjo Bluegrass Style	1981	banjo solos
213	Various Artists	Southern Clawhammer Banjo	1978	banjo solos
214	Dick Weissman	Modern Banjo - Mountain Style	1979	banjo solos
215	Eric Thompson	Eric Thompson's Bluegrass Guitar	1979	guitar
216	Various Artists	New England Contra Dance Music	1978	various
217	Robert Force and Albert d'Ossche	The Art of the Dulcimer	1980	mountain dulcimer
218	Mark Nelson	The Rights of Man	1980	mountain dulcimer
219	Janita Baker	Fingerpicking Dulcimer	1982	mountain dulcimer
220	Bonnie Carol	Fingerdances for Dulcimer	1980	mountain dulcimer
221	Mark Biggs	Season of the Dream	1983	mountain dulcimer
222	Neal Hellman	Appalachian Dulcimer Duets	1981	mountain dulcimer
223	Michael Rugg	Rugg's Celtic Collection for Dulcimer	1981	mountain dulcimer
224	The New York Banjo Ensemble	Plays Gershwin	1982	banjo
225	Various Artists	Dulcimer Music for the Christmas Season	1983	mountain dulcimer
226	Randy Wilkinson	Elizabethan Music for Dulcimer	1982	mountain dulcimer
227	Lance Frodsham	Dulcimer Songs and Dances of the British Islands	1983?	mountain dulcimer
228	Bonnie Phipps	Autoharpin'	1982	autoharp

=== 300 series - Blues, jazz and miscellaneous ===
No.	Artist(s)	Title	Date	Notes
301	Happy Traum	American Stranger	1978	guitar & vocals
302	Bert Jansch	A Rare Conundrum	1978	guitar, vocals & band
303	Ralph McTell	Easy	1978	guitar, vocals & band
304	George Gritzbach	The Sweeper	1978	instruments & vocals
305	Charlie Musselwhite	The Harmonica According to Charlie Musselwhite	1978	Chicago blues

== See also ==
- List of record labels
