= Rory Block =

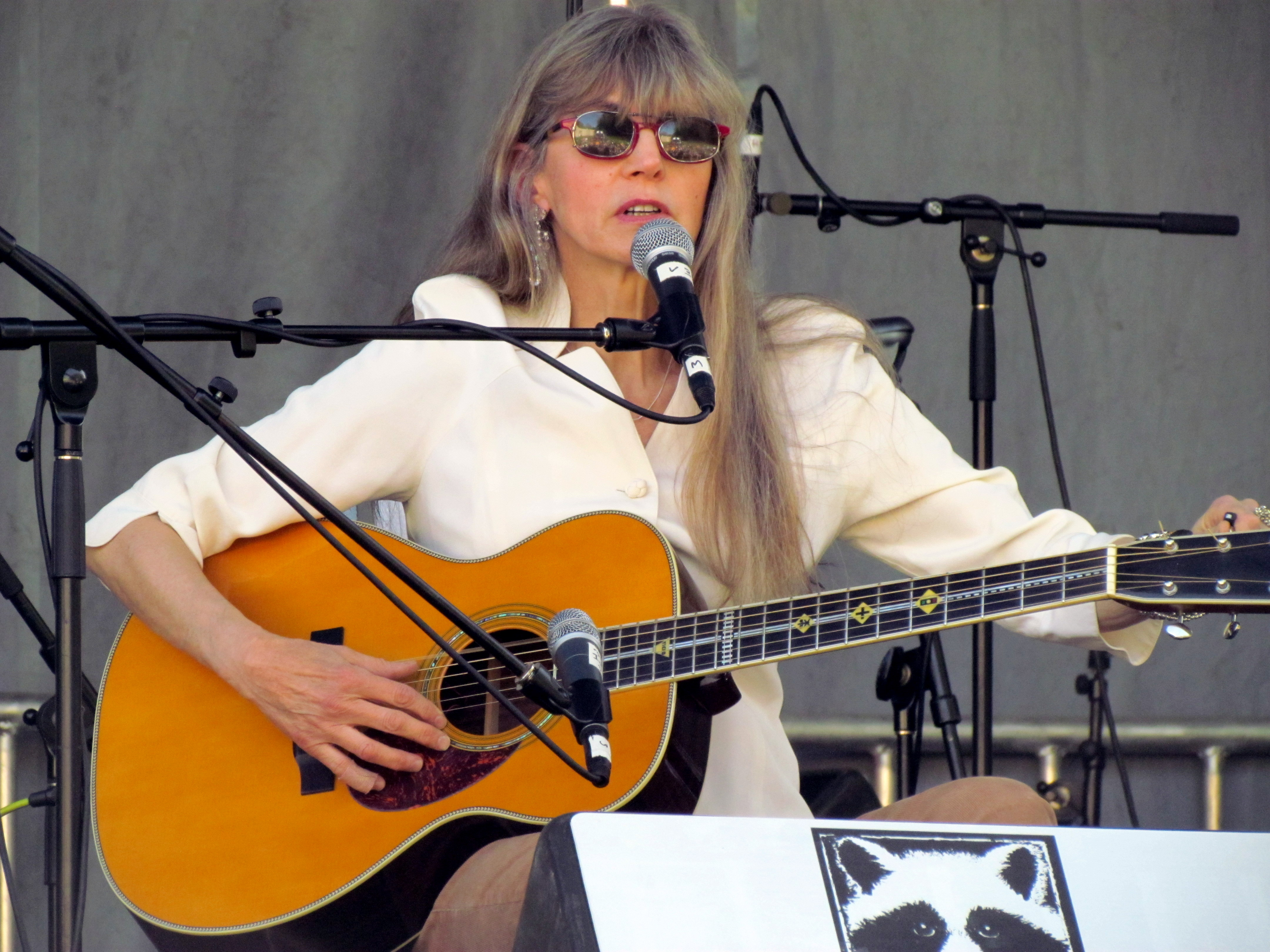
- Rory Block at the MerleFest 2014

Background information
- Born: Aurora Block; November 6, 1949 (age 76); Princeton, New Jersey, U.S.
- Genre: Country blues
- Occupations: Musician, singer
- Instrument: Guitar
- Years active: 1964–present
- Labels: Chrysalis; Rounder; Telarc; Rykodisc; Stony Plain
- Website: Roryblock.com

Aurora "Rory" Block (born November 6, 1949) is an American blues guitarist and singer, a notable exponent of the country blues style.

== Career ==
Aurora Block was born in Princeton, New Jersey, and grew up in Manhattan. Her father, Allan Block, ran a sandal shop in Greenwich Village in the 1960s frequented by folk musicians, and the neighborhood folk music scene, such as Peter Rowan, Maria Muldaur, and John Sebastian, influenced Block to study classical guitar. At the age of 14, she met the guitarist Stefan Grossman, who introduced her to the music of Mississippi Delta blues guitarists.

Block began listening to old albums, transcribing them, and learning to play the songs. At age 15, she left home to seek out the remaining blues giants, such as Mississippi John Hurt, Reverend Gary Davis, and Son House, and hone her craft in the traditional manner of blues musicians; then she traveled to Berkeley, California, where she played in clubs and coffeehouses.

After retiring temporarily to raise a family, Block returned to the music industry in the 1970s with middling success until signing with Rounder Records in 1981, who encouraged her to return to her love for the classical blues form. Since then she has carved out her own niche, releasing numerous critically acclaimed albums of original and traditional songs, including many Robert Johnson covers, such as "Terraplane Blues" and "Come on in My Kitchen". Her 1986 album, I've Got a Rock in My Sock, included contributions from Taj Mahal and David Bromberg. The same year, Block's 19 year old son, Thiele, died in an automobile accident. Her tribute to him, House of Hearts, contained mostly Block penned tracks.

Angel of Mercy, Turning Point, and Tornado included mostly original compositions. However, Mama's Blues, Ain't I a Woman and When a Woman Gets the Blues featured songs written by Tommy Johnson, Robert Johnson, Lottie Beaman, and Mattie Delaney.

In 2010, Block released her autobiography in .pdf format and a limited print run titled When a Woman Gets the Blues.

== Awards ==
Rory Block has won seven Blues Music Awards, two for "Traditional Blues Female Artist" (1997, 1998), three for "Acoustic Blues Album of the Year" (1996, 1999, 2007), the 2019 "Acoustic Artist of the Year" and the prestigious Koko Taylor Award for Traditional Female Blues Artist in 2021. She also won 3 NAIRD awards for "Best Adult Contemporary Album of the Year" in 1992 for Ain't I A Woman, in 1994 for Angel of Mercy, and again in 1997 for Tornado. Rory also won the "Trophees France Blues 98" for "International Acoustic Guitarist of the Year". She was inducted in to The New York Blues Hall of Fame in 2016.

== Discography ==
Year	Title	Label	Number	Notes
1967	How to Play Blues Guitar	Elektra	EKL 324, EKS 7324	Credited as "Sunshine Kate", with Stefan Grossman, reissued in 1971 as Kicking Mule 109
1975	Rory Block	RCA Victor	APL1-0733	
1976	I'm in Love	Blue Goose	BG-2022	
1977	Intoxication, So Bitter Sweet	Chrysalis	1157	
1979	You're the One	Chrysalis	1233	
1981	High Heeled Blues	Rounder	3061	Recorded at Bearsville Sound Studios, produced by John Sebastian
1983	Blue Horizon	Rounder	3073	
1984	Rhinestones & Steel Strings	Rounder	3085	
1986	I've Got a Rock in My Sock!	Rounder	3097	
1987	Best Blues and Originals	Rounder	11525	Compilation, drawn from the four Rounder Records albums 1981–1986
1987	House of Hearts	Rounder	3104	
1989	Turning Point	Munich	145	
1990	Color Me Wild	Alcazar	1003	Children's album
1991	Mama's Blues	Rounder	3117	
1992	Ain't I a Woman	Rounder	3120	1992 Adult Contemporary Album of the Year
1994	Angel of Mercy	Rounder	3126	1994 Adult Contemporary Album of the Year
1994	Women in (E)motion Festival	Tradition & Moderne	107	Recorded live, Bremen, Germany, 1988
1995	When a Woman Gets the Blues	Rounder	3139	1996 Acoustic Blues Album of the Year
1989	Turning Point	Munich	145	
1996	Tornado	Rounder	3140	1997 Adult Contemporary Album of the Year
1997	Gone Woman Blues: The Country Blues Collection	Rounder	11575	Compilation, drawn from the five Rounder Records albums 1992–1996
1997	The Early Tapes 1975–1976	Alcazar	111	re-release of I'm In Love
1998	Confessions Of A Blues Singer	Rounder	3154	1999 Acoustic Blues Album of the Year
2002	I'm Every Woman	Rounder	3174	
2003	Last Fair Deal	Telarc	CD 83593	
2004	Sisters & Brothers	Telarc	CD 83588	With Eric Bibb and Maria Muldaur
2005	From the Dust	Telarc	CD 83614	
2006	The Lady and Mr. Johnson	Rykodisc	RCD 10872	2007 Acoustic Blues Album of the Year, a tribute to Robert Johnson
2008	Country Blues Guitar: Rare Archival Recordings 1963–1971	Stefan Grossman's Guitar Workshop	SGGW 103	With Stefan Grossman, reissue of How to Play Blues Guitar plus 16 additional tracks
2008	Blues Walkin' Like a Man: A Tribute to Son House	Stony Plain	SPCD 1329	First release in the Mentor Series.
2011	Shake 'Em on Down: A Tribute to Mississippi Fred McDowell	Stony Plain	SPCD 1344	Second release in the Mentor Series.
2012	I Belong to the Band: A Tribute to Rev. Gary Davis	Stony Plain	SPCD 1359	Third release in the Mentor Series.
2013	Avalon: A Tribute to Mississippi John Hurt	Stony Plain	SPCD 1369	Fourth release in the Mentor Series.
2014	Hard Luck Child: A Tribute to Skip James	Stony Plain	SPCD 1373	Fifth release in the Mentor Series.
2016	Keepin' Outta Trouble: A Tribute to Bukka White	Stony Plain	SPCD 1393	Sixth release in the Mentor Series.
2018	A Woman’s Soul: A Tribute to Bessie Smith	Stony Plain	SPCD 1399	Power Women Of The Blues series – Vol. 1
2020	Prove It On Me: A Tribute to Groundbreaking Women of the Blues	Stony Plain	SPCD 1409	Power Women Of The Blues series – Vol. 2
2022	Ain't Nobody Worried: Celebrating Great Women Of Song	Stony Plain	SPCD 1468	Power Women Of The Blues series – Vol. 3
2024	Positively 4th Street: A Tribute to Bob Dylan	Stony Plain	SPCD 1493	
2025	Heavy On the Blues	M.C. Records	MC-0095	

== Festival appearances ==
- Pinkpop Festival, Netherlands - 1989
- Belgium Rhythm 'n' Blues Festival - 1989
- Long Beach Blues Festival - 1993
- San Francisco Blues Festival - 1999
- Notodden Blues Festival - 2006
- Kemptville Live Music Festival - 2017
- New Orleans Jazz Festival - 2022
