= John James (guitarist) =

Welsh fingerstyle guitarist and songwriter (born 1947)

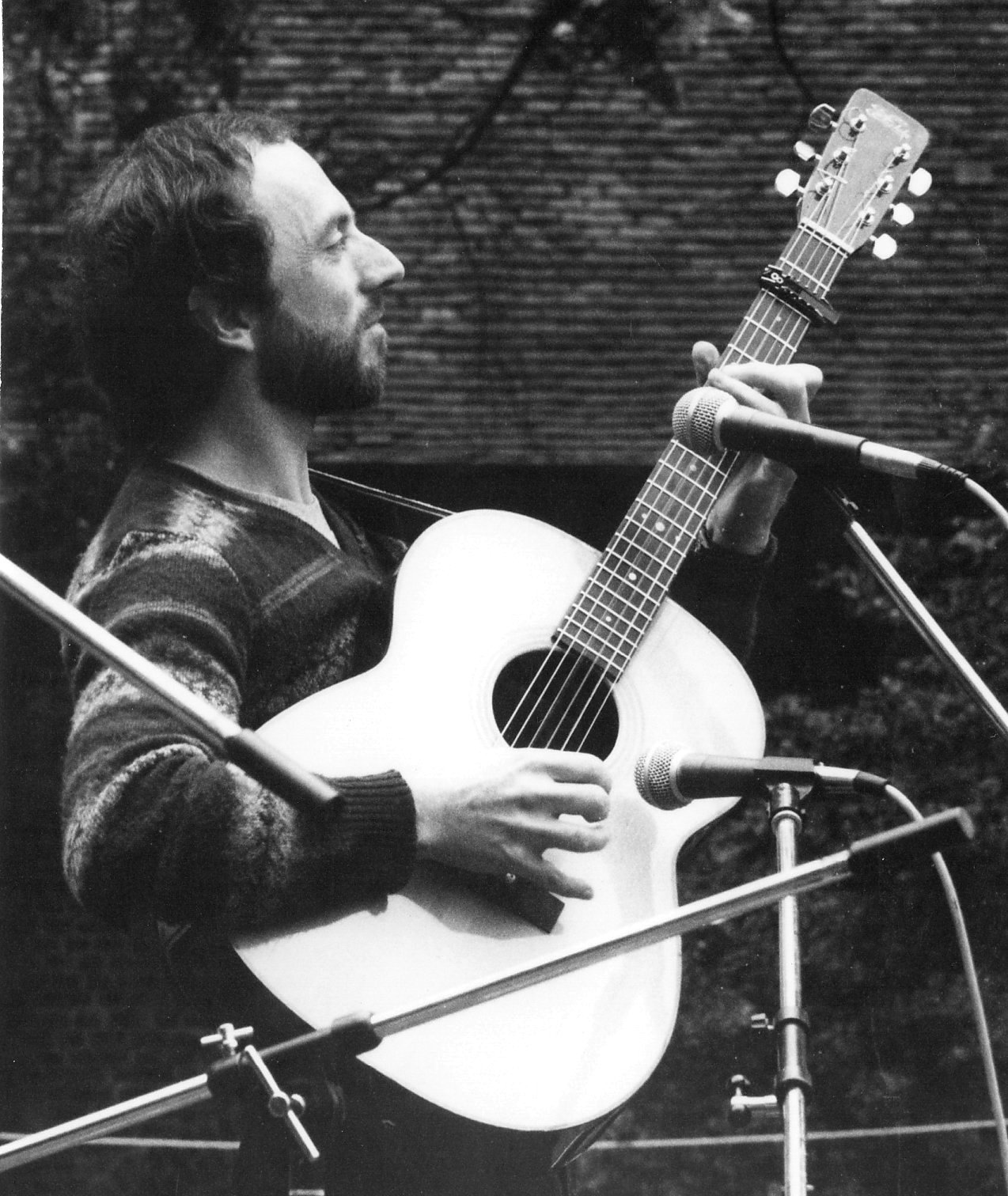
- James on stage in Greenwich, England, 1982

Background information
- Born: 1947 (age 78–79); Lampeter, Wales
- Genres: Folk, pop, rock, jazz, blues
- Occupation: Musician
- Instrument: Guitar
- Years active: 1968–present
- Labels: Transatlantic, Kicking Mule
- Website: johnjamesguitarist.com

John James (born 1947) is a British musician, known primarily, as a solo acoustic fingerstyle guitarist, composer and entertainer.

== Biography ==
=== Early days ===
Born and raised in the hills of West Wales, the first live music James heard was in the chapel: congregational hymn singing with an emphasis on harmony. When he bought his first record (Little Richard's "Tutti Frutti"/"Long Tall Sally") at 10 years old, he was already two years into classical piano study. After dabbling with different musical instruments including the drums and chromatic harmonica, by his 12th birthday the piano was forsaken for the guitar.

First public performance was in a skiffle cum rock'n'roll group at the local Cymru Groes youth club. The following year the beat group Dave and the Diamonds was formed which later became the Roadrunners. In 1965, James moved to Aberystwyth and joined the Xenons, playing a more pop based repertoire. Playing lead guitar, his on-stage gear was first a Futurama guitar into a Watkins Dominator amplifier and Watkins Copycat echo combination, later upgrading to a Burns Jazz solid and Vox Supertwin amplifier. But in 1966, fingerstyle was taking over with the help of the studies of Sor and BMG Magazine, the electric gear was replaced by a Levin Goliath (LN-26); a dreadnought shaped guitar with maple back and sides.

In 1967, James left for London with a head full of such diverse guitar sounds as Seqovia, Lonnie Johnson, Charlie Byrd, Django Reinhardt, Ida Presti, Wes Montgomery, Hank Marvin and Duane Eddy. Arriving in London in early 1967, James did the rounds of the city's folk clubs playing floor spots with an acoustic guitar. Then various gigs at venues such as Middle Earth (Round House) opening for Led Zeppelin and Blue Cheer. The Klooks Kleek club, opening for Junior's Eyes and Brian Auger's Trinity. Then through a friendship with John Martyn, James was taken up by the Sandy Glennon Agency. Other artistes on Glennon's books at the time, included Cliff Aungier, Gerry Lockran, Hamish Imlach, Alex Campbell, John Martyn, Sandy Denny, Johnny Silvo and Diz Disley. James joined the prestigious roster and started running round the folk clubs and colleges of Britain. One of the rites of passage for musicians at the time was recording a session for John Peel's BBC Radio One programme Nightride; James was on the show in 1969. First solo acoustic guitar recordings were made in Bob Hall's front room in South London and released on the Saydisc label on the compilation album Blues like Showers of Rain, featuring Joanne Kelly, Dave Kelly, Francis McGillivray and Mike Cooper.

A contract with Transatlantic Records followed. However the first tracks by James that Transatlantic released were on the Contemporary Guitar Sampler, a budget album that also featured Bert Jansch, John Renbourn, Gordon Giltrap and Mike Rogers. James' track "And the Dog was Sleeping in the Corner" was recorded at Bill Leader's house in North London. James first solo release was the album Morning Brings the Light and followed by John James, both of which were made up of mostly own songs and guitar instrumentals.

At the end of 1970, James left London to live in Cornwall and join the Famous Jug Band, replacing Clive Palmer who, after his short time with the Incredible String Band, had formed the Famous Jug Band with Jill Johnson, Henry the Jug (Mick Barlett) and Pete Berryman. The gig in Berryman and James making an album of acoustic guitar instrumentals. The album Sky in my Pie, released on Transatlantic, was recorded in Sound Techniques, Chelsea and produced by Stefan Grossman.

=== Instructional film ===
In 1974 through Transatlantic and Polyvideo (Leeds), James presented the first guitar instruction video, playing a guitar made by John Bailey, borrowed from Bert Jansch. The project was shot on film, then transferred to video, but due to the high expenses of such an exercise at the time, Transatlantic got cold feet and put it on the back burner, where it stayed. A booklet to accompany the video was produced, First Steps in Folk Guitar, with a guitar notation system devised by Bob Bater, a journalist from Bristol, entitled Unitab. James had to wait for technology to develop and eventually a new guitar instruction video was recorded and released by Virgin Vision in the Music Makers series presented by Jools Holland.

=== 1974 ===
Recordings made at Chipping Norton Studios in 1974 with Danny Thompson (bass) and Jim Cuomo (saxophone/clarinet), mostly featuring James compositions were not released. But further sessions at Chipping Norton produced the guitar instrumental album Head in The Clouds released in 1975. This featured three tracks with John Renbourn: "Wormwood Tangle", "Stranger in The World" and "Georgemass Junction". These were the first recordings of Renbourn and James together.

In 1976, James and Renbourn collaborated again on James album Guitar Jump (working title) released on Kicking Mule Records as Descriptive Guitar Instrumentals. The three tracks were "New Nothing", "Guitar Jump" and "From the Bridge". James played a Fylde Oberon and Redbourn a Guild D55. Also on this record were a couple of tracks with American guitarist Duck Baker making his UK recording debut. The album was recorded at Livingston Studios, North London.

The album Descriptive Guitar Instrumentals won Best Contemporary Instrumental Album 1977 (Acoustic News). This followed James guesting on Renbourn's album The Hermit. Duetting on the early music pieces "A Toye" and "Lord Willoughby's Welcome Home", also recorded with Nic Kinsey at Livingston. James next release was again on Kicking Mule Records (a label put together by Ed Denson and Stefan Grossman) Live in Concert. An album recorded over three nights at Studio Theatre, The Round House in London. The Stranglers were on in the main auditorium at the same time. Chris Billings joined James on the Round House stage, playing guitar parts formerly recorded by Renbourn and Pete Berryman. James met New Yorker 'Happy Traum' through the Kicking Mule guitar shows. It sparked a touring partnership and enduring friendship.

=== US tours ===
Through the association with Happy Traum and Homespun Tapes, James toured the US several times during the late 1970s and early 1980s. Though mostly playing venues on the East Coast such as The Other End (New York), Joyous Lake (Woodstock), Passim's (Boston), and on the West Coast such as McCabes (in Santa Monica, Los Angeles), The Catalyst (Santa Cruz), Freight & Salvage (San Francisco), etc. In association with Kicking Mule Records, James also toured in the US with Bert Jansch and Martin Jenkins.

1981 saw the release of the album With a Suitcase Shaped like That on 12th Street Records featuring a repertoire of international guitar music from South America and Europe including arrangements of harp tune's from Wales. The next year James formed Stoptime Recordings in partnership with Paul Perlin. The first album release was Flamenco Horizons featuring flamenco guitarist Marcos. This album was recorded at Dave Pegg's Woodworm studios in Oxfordshire.

In 1984 James was in Woodworm Studios again to record the album Acoustica Eclectica. From these sessions with Chris Billings (bass, flute vocals) and Dick Heckstall-Smith (saxophone) the band 3 Space was born. The album also had two tracks with Pete Berryman - "Rain on the Window" and "Dangling", the first time the two guitarists had recorded together since Sky in my Pie (1971).

After opening for blues musicians such as Mississippi Fred McDowell, Doctor Ross, and John Lee Hooker along the way, a highlight came in 1981 when James toured the UK with Sonny Terry and Brownie McGhee. It was the final tour for the duo in the Britain.

=== 3 Space ===
John James had befriended Dick Heckstall-Smith in Devon, where they both lived at the time. James was playing a gig in Exeter Arts Centre with poet Roger McGough and Heckstall-Smith came along with some mutual friends. Chris Billings joined Heckstall-Smith and James and the group became a trio. Billings a music graduate from St Lukes, Exeter played electric, acoustic and bass guitars, also flute and keyboards. The line up was suggested by the Jimmy Guiffre drummer less groups, known tracks such as "Train and the River". The working idea of the repertoire was the music of Monk, Mingus, Mose Allison and some be-bop standards, plus all three musicians were composers.

There was a slight quandary of how to work in Heckstall-Smith's penchant of playing Jimi Hendrix guitar tunes on the saxophone. He put his tenor saxophone through a wah-wah pedal, but played the baritone instrument in a straight manner. Heckstall-Smith's ability to play both instruments was heard to maximum effect in this intimate line-up. When Billlings left to pursue a life as a luthier, Dave Moore (keyboards) joined. Moore had been in a group called Mainsqueeze with Meckstall-Smith. Mainsqueeze was a blues rock band whose members included John O'Leary, Keith Tillman, Diana Wood, Victor Brox, Eric Bell and Keef Hartley. It was during this period that James acquired the nickname, Epiphone Emperor. The 3 Space lineup of James, Heckstall-Smith and Moore played the Cropredy Festival. The band existed between 1984 and 1986.

=== 1987 ===
After three years in 3 Space improvising in an ensemble lineup using mainly the chromatic system, the recording of the album Guitar Music in 1987 (produced by Dave Ahern in Plymouth) marked for James a return to solo guitar instrumentals. The Guitar Music album was issued on audio cassette only, and featured transcriptions of piano pieces, such as "Grace & Beauty", "Calliope Rag", "Carolina Shout", and "Smokey Mokes". Another old favourite, "Orange Blossom Special" was performed as a fingerstyle guitar solo.

=== Carolina Shout ===
In 1988 James together with Eddie Walker formed the duo, Carolina Shout. Over the next eight years or so, they played extensively in Europe and all over the UK, including in 1991 the Cambridge Folk Festival. In 1992, under the patronage of Gordon Simpson Music, the duo presented a daylong guitar seminar at the Edinburgh Folk Festival, followed by a headline concert the same night.

An expansive repertoire of western swing, blues and folk nowadays referred to as Americana, enabled the duo to play a varied tour schedule. Playing venues in Germany, Holland, Austria, Switzerland, Italy and elsewhere where bands with bigger line-ups were the norm. Walker who took on the role of lead vocalist and acoustic rhythm guitar, was widely known on the UK folk scene as a solo singer guitarist/songwriter. He had composed the love song "Stolen My Heart Away". The pairing produced two albums Carolina Shout and Side Steppin' (Stoptime Records).

In 2013, a reunion concert was held at The Acoustic Music Centre on the Edinburgh Fringe.

The release of the album Guitar Greats in 1999 saw a change from composing and transposing to featuring music from other guitar players who attained notability for their contribution to the instrument rather than popularity from commercial success, including such players as:

- Blind Blake ("Blind Arthur's Breakdown") — With a unique right hand technique, he led the way in the pantheon of ragtime and blues guitarist of the 1920s.
- Alirio Diaz ("El Marabino")
- Hank Garland ("Lowdown Billy")
- Carl Kress ("Feeling My Way") — Kress was a pioneer in different tunings e.g. Bflat F D G A D. His recordings in the 1930s both with Dick McDonough and Eddie Lang remain the high point of acoustic guitar duets of any period.
- Eddie Lang ("April Kisses") — An unusual piece, which Eddie plays with his extraordinary plectrum technique. He is noted for the duets with Lonnie Johnson in the 1920s.
- Les Paul ("Lover") — Les Paul recorded the first multi-guitar instrumental hit record in 1948. He used a method of over dubbing guitar parts from one disc to another. James featured this tune in his live show Guitar Greats but using a multi-track tape.

Among the guitars used on the album, as well as the Fylde Oberon and Epiphone Emperor, was a 1949 Gibson LG1, which James had bought from a music shop run by two session musicians (Terry Walsh and Bobby Kevin) in Tooting, London, on his 21st birthday in 1968.

Over a decade passed before the recording of the CD Cafe Vienna. Released on Stoptime in 2013, it featured all James compositions, played on two Fylde six strings and a Fylde custom made nine string. Acoustic guitar instrumentals make up most of the album. Though the title song "Cafe Vienna" is about life on the road as a soloist, the venue in the song is not necessarily in Vienna but anywhere, a montage of every gig and hundreds of after hours jam sessions. Other songs featured were "What a Way To Go" written in the early 1970s with Pete Berryman in mind. New recordings were included of "One Long Happy Night" and "I Used To Live by the Sea", both off the first album Morning Brings the Light, and written in London in 1969.

=== Broadsides ===
Broadsides was a BBC TV series presented by John James produced in Cardiff 1978/9. The programme featured top acts from the UK and Irish folk scene, such as The Bothy Band, The Hennessey's, MacCalmans, June Tabor and Martin Simpson, Saffron Summerfield. The programme aired on Saturday nights usually after Match of the Day or Parkinson.

=== Guitar Magazine ===
George Clinton first published Guitar Magazine in August 1972 with John Williams on the cover. The original idea was to encompass all forms of the instrument, but as other publications started up better suited to cover electric guitar and rock and pop, Clinton changed editorial policy and moved to more classical, flamenco, some folk and blues and jazz. Generally concentrating on fingerstyle guitar, Clinton also changed the title to Guitar International. In 1983, James became a contributor to the magazine and started a series on the history of ragtime music. Each month submitting a feature article plus a transcription of a section from a piece of Joplin or James Scott etc. The idea that the transcriptions, being in staff notation and tabulation would appeal to the classical guitarist as well. After three years, James changed the series to feature more blues pickers such as Muddy Waters, Big Bill Broonzy, Lonnie Johnson, etc. George Clinton had a serious illness in the 1990s and did not recover, and the magazine, without his dynamism and energy, closed.

=== 2010-present ===
John James featured in the 'Guitar Festival' in Denmark. With Dave Laibman, Peter Finger, Woody Mann, Duck Baker, Nick Katzman, Ton Engels and Lasse Johannson amongst the artistes on the bill, it became a de facto 'Kicking Mule Re-union'. One of the most favoured gigs for acoustic guitar players in Europe is the Six Bars Jail in Florence, Italy. James made it there in 2012. Another coveted booking is the 'Guitar Fest' in Douai, France. James featured there with Ian Melrose in 2015.

In April 2022 James presented one of the many guitar seminars at the 'BMG' convention, held in Edinburgh.

== Selected discography ==
- Morning Brings the Light (Transatlantic, 1970)
- John James (Transatlantic, 1971)
- Sky in My Pie (Transatlantic, 1972)
- Head in the Clouds (Transatlantic, 1975)
- Descriptive Guitar Instrumentals (Kicking Mule, 1976)
- Live in Concert (Kicking Mule, 1978)
- With a Suitcase Shaped Like That (12th Street Records, 1981)
- Acoustia Eclectica (Stoptime, 1984)
- Guitar Music (Stoptime, 1988)
- Carolina Shout (Stoptime 1989) with Eddie Walker
- Side Steppin' (Stoptime 1993) with Eddie Walker
- Guitar Greats: John James (Stoptime, 2009)
- Cafe Vienna (Stoptime 2013)
- John James (BGO 2017) CD reissue of Transatlantic LP's.

== Bibliography ==
- Advanced Fingerpicking Guitar, Ragtime and More! (2004). Homespun Tapes (CDJAMRG99).
- Jools Holland's Music Makers - The Guitar With John James DVD (2001). Beckmann Visual Publishing.
- Grossman, Stefan (Ed.) Contemporary Fingerpicking Guitar Workshop (Almo Publications, 1981).
- Grossman, Stefan (Ed.) Fingerpicking Guitar Solos (Chappell Music Ltd., 1979)
