= Stefan Grossman =

American acoustic fingerstyle guitarist and singer (born 1945)

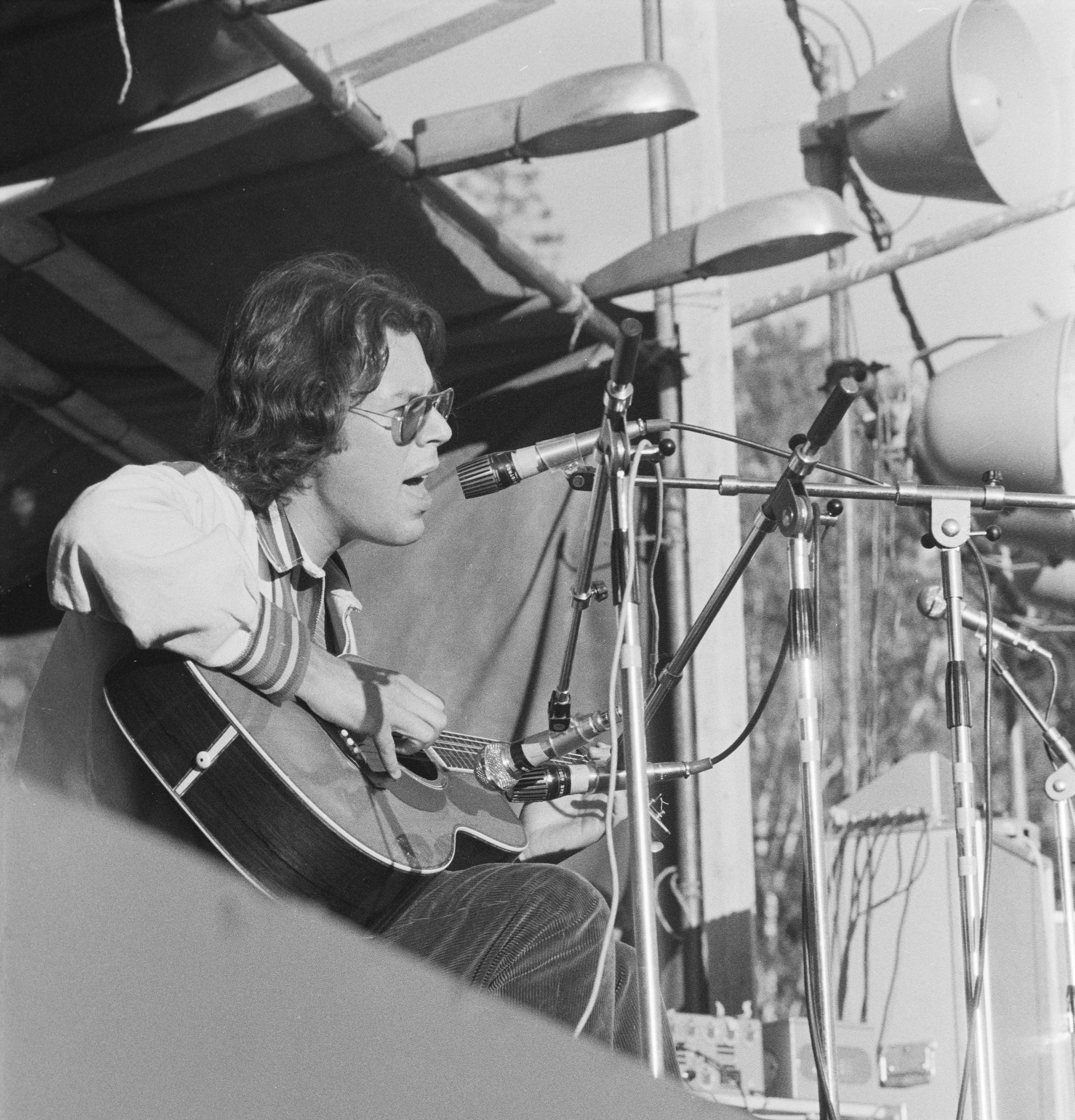
- Stefan Grossman at Ruisrock in Finland, 1971

Background information
- Born: April 16, 1945 (age 80); Brooklyn, New York, United States
- Genres: Blues, folk
- Occupation(s): Musician, songwriter
- Instrument(s): Guitar, vocals
- Years active: 1964–present

Stefan Grossman (born April 16, 1945) is an American acoustic fingerstyle guitarist and singer, music producer and educator, and co-founder of Kicking Mule records. He is known for his instructional videos and Vestapol line of videos and DVDs.

== Early life and influences ==
Born in Brooklyn, United States, Grossman described his upbringing in Queens, New York, as "lower middle-class", and his parents as "very leftist", valuing education and the arts. He began playing acoustic guitar at the age of nine, when his father bought him an archtop-style (f-hole) acoustic guitar made by Harmony. Later he moved on to a Gibson archtop guitar which he played between the ages of nine and eleven, taking lessons and learning to read music. For a few years, he gave up playing but resumed again at the age of 15.

Grossman's interest in the folk revival was sparked by attending the Washington Square Park "Hoots".

He took guitar lessons for several years from Rev. Gary Davis, whom he later described as "one of the greatest exponents of fingerstyle blues and gospel guitar playing" and "an incredible genius as a teacher". He spent countless hours learning and documenting Davis's music, recording much of it on a tape recorder, and developing a form of tablature to take down his teacher's instructions.

In the folk and country blues revival of the 1960s he was listening to old recordings of artists such as Elizabeth Cotten, Big Bill Broonzy, Lead Belly, Josh White, Lightnin' Hopkins, Rev. Gary Davis, Blind Willie Johnson, Blind Boy Fuller, Son House, Charlie Patton, Skip James, Blind Blake, Blind Lemon Jefferson, Brownie McGhee and Woody Guthrie. This brought him into contact with other collectors, including John Fahey, Ed Denson, Bernie Klatzko, Tom Hoskins and Nick Poerls. Collecting the 78s developed into searching for the artists who had recorded them, with many successes: during the mid-60s, Grossman met, befriended and studied guitar with Mississippi John Hurt, Son House, Skip James, Mississippi Fred McDowell and other major blues artists.

== Early career ==
In 1964, Grossman and a group of friends formed the Even Dozen Jug Band. Although they only recorded one LP on the Elektra Records label (long since out of print but available at iTunes), other members were also to have successful musical careers, including David Grisman, Steve Katz (Blood, Sweat & Tears), John Sebastian (The Lovin' Spoonful), Joshua Rifkin and Maria Muldaur (then Maria D'Amato). In the early summer of 1966, there was an effort by Elektra's Paul Rothchild to put together a folk rock group (like The Mamas & the Papas) with Grossman, Taj Mahal, guitarist Steve Mann and a recently returned folk singer from Texas named Janis Joplin. They had a rehearsal in Berkeley, sometime in June (Joplin's first show with Big Brother and the Holding Company was at the Avalon Ballroom June 10, 1966, but she had been in the Bay Area for about 10 days). However, Joplin would not abandon her new band and the deal was scuttled. Subsequently, Grossman spent about three months with The Fugs and a further four months with a band called Chicago Loop. At the same time, however, he was beginning his career as a guitar teacher. With his friend Rory Block and also Mike Cooper, he produced and released one of the earliest (if not the very first) guitar instructional LPs, How To Play Blues Guitar and began the publication of a five volume series of instructional books with Oak Publications called the Oak Anthology of Blues Guitar. These drew on his studies with Rev. Davis and the other older blues artists and on his obsessive listening to old 78s. The Country Blues Guitar, Delta Blues, Texas Blues, Ragtime Blues Guitar and Rev. Gary Davis/Blues Guitar have remained in print through various editions.

In the mid-1960s, Grossman recorded a number of cuts for Joe Bussard and his Frederick, Maryland-based Fonotone Records and performed at the Jabberwock coffeehouse in Berkeley under the nom du folk of "Kid Future". The origins of the name Kid Future date back in the 1930s where there were a number of country blues artists called Willie Brown, the best known of these, and a friend of Son House, recorded a song called "Future Blues", using an open G tuning. The song was considered very difficult to master and puzzled many experienced blues players but Grossman, when still in his teens, figured out how to play it. Given Bussard's penchant for creating noms de plume, as he did for John Fahey when recording him as Blind Thomas in the 1950s, it seems likely that the origins of the name Kid Future lie in Frederick, MD and a talented teenager who had mastered "Future Blues". Grossman also played on Pat Kilroy's Light of Day album released in 1966.

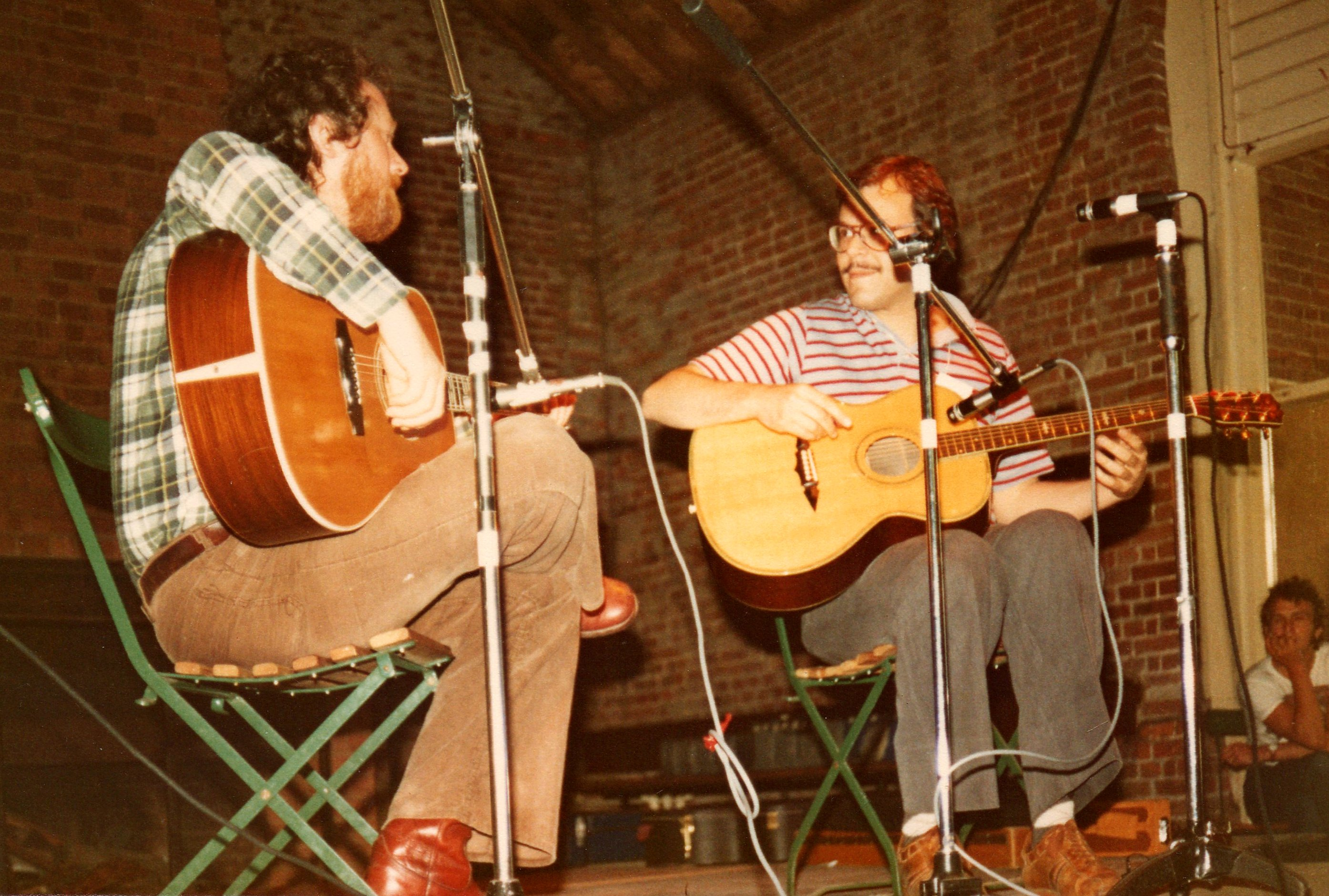
Grossman (right) duetting with John Renbourn at the 1978 Norwich Folk Festival, England

In 1967, Grossman travelled to Europe, as a first step on a planned journey to India which was not completed. In London he stayed at first with Eric Clapton whom he had met whilst in Chicago Loop and met guitarists and singers on the British folk scene including Bert Jansch, John Renbourn, Davy Graham and Ralph McTell and The Young Tradition. He began playing in folk clubs around the country and made his first solo recordings for the Philips/Fontana label (Aunt Molly's Murray Farm and The Gramercy Park Sheikh) and then for Nathan Joseph's Transatlantic label, including Yazoo Basin Boogie and Ragtime Cowboy Jew (see discography). He also traveled widely in Europe and eventually settled in Italy, where he lived for seven years. Travelling around Europe for gigs brought him into contact with many other fine guitarists, but few of them had record deals. Grossman saw a niche in the market for solo acoustic guitar records which were accompanied by a tablature book to allow the buyer to try playing the arrangements and, with his friend Ed Denson taking care of the US side of business, founded Kicking Mule Records. Over the next few years KM released albums by such artists as John James, Happy Traum, Ton van Bergeyk, Dave Evans, Peter Finger and the late Sam Mitchell. Grossman also released his own original and instructional albums on KM, the latter including seminal works such as Fingerpicking Guitar Techniques, How To Play Ragtime Guitar and Famous Ragtime Guitar Solos which had a major influence on acoustic guitarists in Europe, the UK and the US. During these years Grossman was also touring as a solo artist and in partnership with John Renbourn and continuing to write and publish instructional books, often accompanied by the then new technology of a cassette tape.

In 1971, Grossman composed and played the soundtrack to Swedish director Bo Widerberg's bio-pic Joe Hill. The love theme from the movie was released a single the same year.

== Later career ==
In 1987, Grossman returned to live in the US. He toured much less – at least partly due to a painful back problem – and began to consolidate his various teaching and instructional materials under the roof of one company, Stefan Grossman's Guitar Workshop, working at first in cooperation with the Shanachie Records company. He was quick to see the potential of video as well as audio as an instructional tool– budding players could buy an instructional tape for the cost of a single 'real' lesson and have it constantly available. The material which had appeared on LPs such as How To Play Blues Guitar now became available to watch as well as hear. Nor was Grossman the only instructor – the Guitar Workshop 'faculty' included such artists as Chet Atkins, John Renbourn, Woody Mann, Ari Eisinger, John Miller, Larry Coryell, David Laibman, Ernie Hawkins and others.

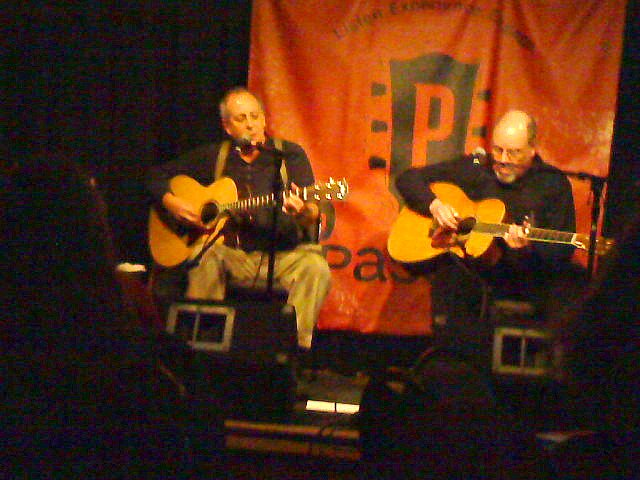
Steve Katz and Grossman performing at Passim coffeehouse in Cambridge, Mass., on January 22, 2012

Grossman also began to acquire concert footage of the old blues and country artists who had been rediscovered in the 1960s and had often made TV appearances; this was the basis of Vestapol Videos, which edited and reissued this footage. It was a breakthrough for younger guitarists to be able to watch Big Bill Broonzy, Lightnin' Hopkins, Rev. Gary Davis and many others long after these players had died. Vestapol rapidly expanded to include concert footage from living artists too. Although originally issued as video tapes, almost all of this material (both instructional and concert) has in the last few years been re-issued on DVD. The Guitar Workshop mails worldwide from its bases in New Jersey and Yorkshire.

Much of the music which Grossman recorded on vinyl during his years in Europe has been reissued on CD, as have many of the Kicking Mule albums (although vinyl LPs remain collectable items), including a 2008 reissue of the original How To Play Blues Guitar LP from 1967, including outtakes and later recordings from subsequent editions of the album. The LP tracks are on the CD Country Blues Guitar: The Archival Recordings 1963–1971 (SGGW103) by Rory Block and Stefan Grossman.

Grossman resumed touring in 2006, since and has appeared in Europe and Japan as well as the US. He is a frequent visitor to England (where he has family) and conducts well-attended guitar workshops as well as giving concerts.

== Guitars ==
Grossman's principal acoustic guitar was a 1930 Martin OM-45 which he later sold. He uses Franklin guitars, made by Nick Kukich, since the 1970s and a custom Martin HJ-38 since 2008. He also owns numerous guitars from different builders, including John Greven, Tony Klassen and Ed Foley. He uses also an old Stella Jumbo 12-string guitar.

In the past, he has also played a Martin OM-28, Euphonon and Prairie State guitars. He favors medium-gauge strings (.013, .017, .026, .036, .046, .056) for slide, and light-gauge strings (.12 – .53) for standard playing.

In 2008 Grossman worked with the Martin Guitar Company to produce a replica guitar, the HJ-38 Stefan Grossman Custom Signature Edition, based on a Jumbo size.

== Bibliography ==
=== Music books written by Grossman ===
- Grossman, Stefan (1972). Contemporary Ragtime Guitar. New York: Oak Publications. ISBN 0-8256-0130-4. LCCN 77-170117.
- Grossman, Stefan (1972). The Book of Guitar Tunings. New York: Amsco Publishing Company. ISBN 0-8256-2806-7. LCCN 74-170019.

=== Music books edited by Grossman ===
- Contemporary Fingerpicking Guitar Workshop (Almo Pubs, 1981).
- Fingerpicking Guitar Styles (Oak Pubs, 1991).
- Grossman, Stefan & Fuller, Blind Boy Stefan Grossman's early masters of American blues guitar: Blind Boy Fuller. Alfred Publishing, 1993 ISBN 0-7390-4331-5

== See also ==
- "Death Don't Have No Mercy"
