= David Breskin =

American journalist

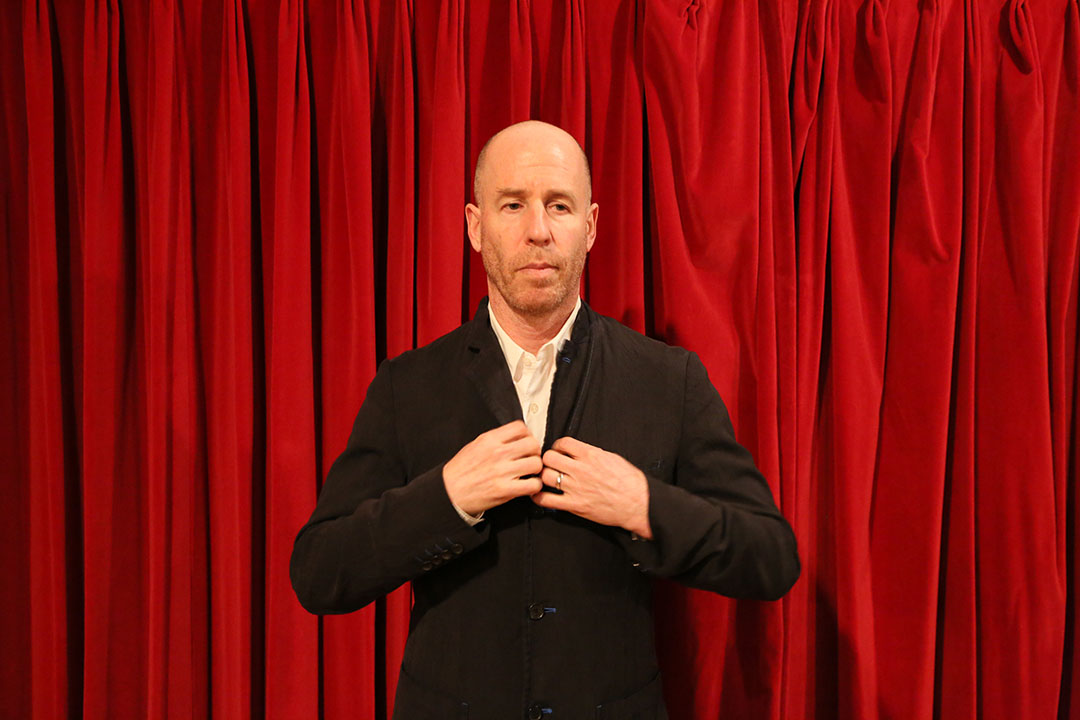
- Born: 1958 (age 67–68); Chicago, Illinois, U.S.
- Education: Brown University (BA)
- Occupations: Writer; Record producer
- Years active: 1980–present
- Website: davidbreskin.com

David Breskin (born 1958) is an American writer, poet, and record producer. He has written nine books, including collaborations with the visual artists Gerhard Richter and Ed Ruscha. Beginning in the early 1980s, he produced albums by musicians including John Zorn, Bill Frisell, Ronald Shannon Jackson and Vernon Reid. In more recent years, he has worked with Nels Cline, Mary Halvorson, Kris Davis, Miles Okazaki, Dan Weiss, Ingrid Laubrock, and Craig Taborn, among others.

Breskin's poetry has appeared in The New Yorker, The Paris Review, TriQuarterly and New American Writing, among other journals.

== Early life and education ==
Breskin was born and raised in Chicago, Illinois. In college, as a student at Brown University, he wrote for The Village Voice. He graduated from Brown with a B.A. in 1980, magna cum laude, with a double major in history and semiotics.

== Career ==
=== New York: 1980–1990 ===
==== Journalism, Rolling Stone, We Are the World ====
Breskin moved to New York City following his graduation. He wrote for publications including Esquire, The Village Voice, GQ, Musician, Life, and Rolling Stone, where he was a contributing editor. Over the course of the decade, he conducted interviews with Bono, Willie Nelson, Steven Spielberg, and Wayne Shorter, among others, and wrote feature stories on people such as musician Miles Davis, comedian Martin Short, basketball player Michael Jordan and architect Helmut Jahn.

In 1984, Breskin wrote "Kids in the Dark", a Rolling Stone article about the murder of Gary Lauwers by self-professed Satanist Ricky Kasso, told almost completely in the words of the teens and young adults he interviewed in Northport, New York. Following its publication, he co-wrote a play with Rick Cleveland, based on the story, also titled Kids In the Dark. Described by the Chicago Tribune as a "frequently gripping and deeply moving drama", it premiered at Chicago's Victory Gardens Theater in 1987. Breskin's original article was included in the 1993 anthology The Best of Rolling Stone: 25 Years of Journalism on the Edge, and the play was nominated for a 1987 Joseph Jefferson Award for New Work. Breskin's time researching the Kasso story is chronicled in the 2018 book "The Acid King" by Jesse P. Pollack.

Breskin also wrote "Leave It to Beaver", an investigation into a group of high school vigilantes in Fort Worth, Texas, who called themselves the Legion of Doom. The Legion of Doom became the subject of a 1986 television movie called Brotherhood of Justice. His 1984 piece on teen suicide, "Dear Mom and Dad", was a National Magazine Awards finalist.

In 1985, after he profiled record producer Quincy Jones for LIFE, Breskin was invited to be one of two journalists present for the recording of "We Are the World", a song which benefited the charity USA For Africa. He wrote a cover story on the subject for LIFE and later wrote the book We Are The World: The Photos, Music and Inside Story of One of the Most Historic Events in American Popular Music. A detailed narrative of the sessions, it appeared on The New York Times Best Seller list. Breskin donated all royalties from the book's sales to USA for Africa.

==== The Real Life Diary of a Boomtown Girl ====
In 1989, Breskin's novel, The Real Life Diary of a Boomtown Girl, was published by Viking Press. A "candid cultural chronicle of the modern American West" based on his unpublished short story Boomers, it was optioned by Jane Fonda's film company, IPC Films.

==== Ronald Shannon Jackson, Bill Frisell, John Zorn ====
Active in New York's avant-garde music scene since the early 80s, Breskin produced Ronald Shannon Jackson's "milestone" albums Mandance and Barbeque Dog. He continued to produce avant-garde music throughout the decade, and became known for extensive pre-production discussion and planning and the presentation of materials such as packaging, liner notes, and videos which "engaged the visual and tactile sense to provide the best delivery of the album/concept". Among other albums, Breskin produced Pulse, on which Jackson played solo drums, Smash & Scatteration, which paired Bill Frisell with pre-Living Colour Vernon Reid; Strange Meeting (with Jackson, Frisell, and Melvin Gibbs) and "Two-Lane Highway" featuring Albert Collins on John Zorn's Spillane.

=== San Francisco: 1990–present ===
==== Inner Views: Filmmakers in Conversation ====
Breskin moved to San Francisco in 1990. In 1992, longer versions of seven of his Rolling Stone interviews conducted with film directors Robert Altman, Francis Ford Coppola, David Lynch, Oliver Stone, Spike Lee, David Cronenberg and Tim Burton were published by Faber and Faber as Inner Views: Filmmakers in Conversation. An eighth Q&A with Clint Eastwood was included in a later, expanded edition of the book under the same title, published by Da Capo Press in 1997.

==== Poetry, DIRTY BABY, Campaign ====
A finalist for the National Poetry Series, Breskin's first book of poetry, Fresh Kills, was published in 1997; his second, Escape Velocity, was released in 2004. It was followed in 2006 by SUPERMODEL, a one sentence epic poem told in two interwoven strands: one which follows the life of the unnamed supermodel of the title, the other which is composed of fragments of text found online.

In 2010, Delmonico Books / Prestel published Breskin's multi-media book DIRTY BABY. It featured sixty-six paintings by American artist Ed Ruscha, original music by Nels Cline, and "beautiful, lush" poems by Breskin that employ the ancient Arabic poetic form, the ghazal. The book consists of two parts or "sides": side A describes the rise of human civilization, and side B provides an account, in a variety of voices, of the second Iraq War. The book includes four CDs, two of Cline's music and two of spoken-word poetry.

Breskin's sixth book of poetry, Campaign, was published in print and as an audiobook in late 2017. About the book, he wrote: "On February 1, 2016, the date of the Iowa Caucus, the traditional onside kick which begins every presidential scrum, I decided to write a single poem "about" the election, with the vague idea I might write another. To allow for the possibility that something serial, tight, and deliberate might actually happen, I knew I needed a form—an existing form or one of my own. Having toiled (happily) upon the sweltering rack of the ghazal for my last project (DIRTY BABY), I thought it would be more fun to just concoct something. I didn't want anything symmetrical or pleasant. I wanted something wrong-footed and corrugated, but self-contained. So: I created a deliberately awkward, rollickingly restrictive form—seven beats per line, eleven lines per poem, one stanza fits all. And given our country's preference for the convenience of sound-bite news and junk-food polls over more nutritious fare, I decided to call them '7-Elevens.' Slurpee Heaven, 7-Eleven. Seventy-seven beats per poem, no exceptions: it's got a beat and you can't dance to it."

==== RICHTER 858 ====
For his multi-media book RICHTER 858, published by SFMOMA/D.A.P in 2002, Breskin commissioned twelve American poets--including Robert Hass, Michael Palmer, Jorie Graham, Ann Lauterbach and Dean Young--to write poems inspired by the paintings of Gerhard Richter. Dave Hickey and Klaus Kertess contributed essays. He also commissioned Bill Frisell to compose new music for the project. Frisell formed the 858 Quartet with Jenny Scheinman on violin, Eyvind Kang on viola, and Hank Roberts on cello to perform the music for RICHTER 858. About the music Jazz Times wrote: "One might say that Richter sounds like Frisell; his broad lateral smears find their aural counterpart in Frisell's wobbly yet hard nosed minimalism." The 858 Quartet has toured and recorded extensively since then.

=== Music production, 1990s to 2019 ===
In the 1990s and into the following decade, Breskin produced albums for Miniature (Tim Berne, Joey Baron, Hank Roberts), Herb Robertson and Bobby Previte, in addition to three albums for Joey Baron + Barondown. In 2005, the music piece of the RICHTER 858 album was re-released as a stand-alone CD on the Songlines label. For his 2010 multi-media artist collaboration with Ed Ruscha, DIRTY BABY, Breskin commissioned and produced new music by Nels Cline. Rolling Stone wrote: "The two-disc Dirty Baby, his collaboration with polymath poet-producer David Breskin, is Cline's most far-reaching work yet." That same year, he produced The Nels Cline Singers album, Initiate.

Between 2014 and 2016, Breskin produced The Nels Cline Singers' follow-up, Macroscope, as well as albums by Mark Dresser, Ben Goldberg, Kris Davis and Mary Halvorson. Davis' Duopoly, released in 2016, was a series of duets with eight musicians—guitarists Bill Frisell and Julian Lage, pianists Craig Taborn and Angelica Sanchez, drummers Billy Drummond and Marcus Gilmore, and reed players Tim Berne and Don Byron—recorded live to two-track. Of Mary Halvorson's 2016 Away with You, The New York Times called it "unflinching and full of grace ... a standout jazz release of the year". He worked again with Nels Cline, this time on his 23-person ensemble album, Lovers, named by the 2016 NPR Music Jazz Critics Poll as one of the Top 10 albums of that year.

Breskin's subsequent production projects include albums by Kris Davis and Craig Taborn, Dan Weiss, Mary Halvorson, Chris Lightcap, Cory Smythe, Ingrid Laubrock and Mark Dresser. Davis and Taborn joined to release the Breskin-produced Octopus in 2018. The recording was the distillation of a dozen concerts in a national tour that took place in fall of 2016. Of the album, The Wall Street Journal wrote, "Ms. Davis and Mr. Taborn...are elevating jazz beyond the limiting continuum of accessibility and abstraction."

In 2018, he produced Weiss' Starebaby, an album from the drummer/composer's quintet that featured Craig Taborn and Matt Mitchell on keyboards, piano, and electronics; Trevor Dunn on bass; and Ben Monder on guitars. The eight songs on Starebaby were a blend of jazz and heavy metal influences. Halvorson's double album that year, Code Girl, featured her improvisational style set to lyrics. It was called "riveting" by Nate Chinen for NPR's The Record, and "the most startling move of her solo career."

Laubrock's 2018 album, Contemporary Chaos Practices, was her first orchestral recording, featuring 47 musicians and two conductors. "Volgelfrei" from this album was named by The New York Times as one of "The 25 Best Classical Music Tracks of 2018".

In May 2019, the Mark Dresser Seven released Ain't Nothing But a Cyber Coup & You, produced by Breskin and featuring Nicole Mitchell and Jim Black. In August, the Breskin-conceived Good Day For Cloud Fishing was released. This was Ben Goldberg's trio recording with Nels Cline and trumpeter and cornetist Ron Miles. The project was inspired by the poems of Dean Young, who subsequently joined the musicians in the studio and wrote new poems in response to the music he heard.

Three additional albums produced by Breskin came out in October 2019: Jon Irabagon's Invisible Horizon, Chris Lightcap's SuperBigmouth, and Kris Davis' Diatom Ribbons, featuring Grammy Award-winning artists Esperanza Spalding and Terri Lyne Carrington as well as turntablist Val Jeanty. The project, which grew out of Breskin's suggestion that she do a funk record, was No. 1 in The New York Times Best Jazz of 2019, and the top album in the 2019 NPR Music Jazz Critics Poll. "Davis is a master quilter, able to turn a patchwork of colors, inspirations, textures, and voices into a single harmonious vision," wrote JazzTimes of Diatom Ribbons.

=== Music production, 2020 to present ===
The decade began with the release of six new Breskin-produced projects. In June 2020, Pyroclastic Records released Accelerate Every Voice from Cory Smythe, an album that was honored by NPR Music's 8th Annual Jazz Critic's Poll as a top five in the vocals category. In September, Breskin produced the Sylvie Courvoisier Trio album, Free Hoops,. Also that month, he produced the album Natural Selection, the second album from Dan Weiss's jazz-metal hybrid Starebaby.

Seven Storey Mountain VI, the next part of Nate Wooley's album series inspired by priest, monk and philosopher Thomas Merton's autobiography, was produced by Breskin and released October 2020. The same month saw the release of NPR's No. 4 of Top 50 New Albums, Artlessly Falling, from Mary Halvorson's Code Girl, produced by Breskin and featuring vocals by English musician Robert Wyatt. The Minneapolis Star Tribune wrote: "The producer of Code Girl's records, David Breskin, is also a published poet. He challenged Halvorson to organize her lyrics into different poetic forms, including a sestina, a ghazal, a pantoum, a tanka and a haibun (which combines haiku with prose)."

In November 2020, the Breskin-produced Dreamt Twice, Twice Dreamt by Ingrid Laubrock was released by Intakt Records. Inspired by the dreams Laubrock documented for the past decade in her dream journal, disc one of the double album contained five compositions recorded by a large ensemble consisting of the EOS Chamber Orchestra and a group of five soloists. Disc two was a near mirror repeat of the five compositions, this time reimagined by Laubrock's small ensemble with Cory Smythe on piano, Sam Pluta on electronics, and three other guest musicians.

== Discography ==
Year	Album	Artist	Credit	Label
2020	Dreamt Twice, Twice Dreamt	Ingrid Laubrock	producer	Intakt
2020	Artlessly Falling	Mary Halvorson's Code Girl	producer	Firehouse 12
2020	Seven Storey Mountain VI	Nate Wooley	producer, album design	Pyroclastic Records
2020	Natural Selection	Dan Weiss/Starebaby	producer	Pi Recordings
2020	Free Hoops	Sylvie Courvoisier	producer	Intakt
2020	Accelerate Every Voice	Cory Smythe	producer, album design	Pyroclastic Records
2020	Slipknots Through a Looking Glass	Eric Revis	album design	Pyroclastic Records
2019	Diatom Ribbons	Kris Davis	producer, album design	Pyroclastic Records
2019	Invisible Horizon	Jon Irabagon	producer, album design	Irabbagast
2019	SuperBigmouth	Chris Lightcap	producer	Pyroclastic Records
2019	Good Day For Cloud Fishing	Ben Goldberg	concept, album design	Pyroclastic Records
2019	Ain't Nothing But a Cyber Coup & You	Mark Dresser Seven	producer, design concept	Clean Feed
2018	Contemporary Chaos Practices	Ingrid Laubrock	producer	Intakt
2018	Circulate Susanna	Cory Smythe	producer, album design	Pyroclastic Records
2018	Superette	Chris Lightcap	producer, cover art concept/photography	Royal Potato Family
2018	Code Girl	Mary Halvorson	producer	Firehouse 12
2018	Starebaby	Dan Weiss	producer	Pi Recordings
2018	Octopus	Kris Davis, Craig Taborn	producer	Pyroclastic Records
2017	I Am a Man	Ron Miles	album design	Yellowbird
2016	Away With You	Mary Halvorson	producer	Firehouse 12
2016	Sedimental You	Mark Dresser	producer	Clean Feed
2016	Duopoly	Kris Davis	producer, album design	Pyroclastic Records
2016	Lovers	Nels Cline	producer, album design	Blue Note Records
2015	Orphic Machine	Ben Goldberg	producer, album design	BAG Production Records/Royal Potato Family
2014	Short-Sighted Dream Colossus	John Dieterich, Ben Goldberg, Scott Amendola	album design, resequencing	SAZi Records/BAG Production
2014	Macroscope	The Nels Cline Singers	producer, album design	Mack Avenue
2010	Dirty Baby	Nels Cline	producer, album design	Cryptogramophone
2010	Initiate	The Nels Cline Singers	producer, album design	Cryptogramophone
2005	Richter 858	Bill Frisell	producer	Songlines
2002	The 23 Constellations of Joan Miró	Bobby Previte	producer	Tzadik
2000	Puttin' On Dog	Ronald Shannon Jackson	producer	Knit Classics re-release of Pulse
1998	Crackshot	Joey Baron + Barondown	producer	Avant
1994	Raised Pleasure Dot	Joey Baron + Barondown	producer	New World Records
1992	Tongue in Groove	Joey Baron + Barondown	producer	JMT
1991	Certified	Herb Robertson	producer	JMT
1991	I Can't Put My Finger on It	Miniature	producer	JMT
1989	Tim Berne's Fractured Fairy Tales	Tim Berne	mixing	JMT
1987	Spillane	John Zorn	producer, "Two Lane Highway" (Albert Collins)	Elektra/Nonesuch
1987	Strange Meeting	Power Tools	producer	Antilles/New Directions
1985	Black Swan Quartet	Black Swan Quartet	producer	Minor Music
1984	Earned Dreams	Ronald Shannon Jackson & The Decoding Society	producer	Knit Classics
1984	Smash & Scatteration	Bill Frisell / Vernon Reid	producer	Rykodisc
1984	Pulse	Ronald Shannon Jackson	producer	Celluloid Records
1983	Barbeque Dog	Ronald Shannon Jackson & The Decoding Society	producer	Antilles
1982	Mandance	Ronald Shannon Jackson & The Decoding Society	producer	Antilles

– Source:
