= Tongue in Groove =

Studio album by Joey Baron
- Released: 1992
- Recorded: May 1991; Sorcerer Sound, NYC
- Genre: Jazz
- Length: 52:22
- Label: JMT; JMT 849 158
- Producer: David Breskin

Joey Baron chronology
I Can't Put My Finger on It (1991)	Tongue in Groove (1992)	RAIsedpleasuredot (1993)

Tongue in Groove is an album by drummer Joey Baron, his first as leader, which was recorded in 1991 and released on the JMT label.

== Reception ==
Professional ratings
Review scores
Source	Rating
Allmusic	3/5 stars
The Penguin Guide to Jazz Recordings	4/4 stars

In his review for Allmusic, Scott Yanow notes that "Some of the originals find the unusual group resembling a high school band a bit while other pieces are quite explorative and interesting. The fact that the spirited group sounds complete much of the time is particularly notable". On AllAboutJazz Tom Johnson said "What makes it most fun is that the band seems to be hell-bent for making the biggest, rudest noises they can. Eskelin's sax farts and spits, Swell's trombone slips and slides, and Baron hammers out his usual trademark intense, tuneful, and humorous drumming. Even without a bassist, the three find a groove and they'll ride it just long enough to come right up to the edge of overdoing it—and then they'll swerve right into something else. And more often than not, they'll find something as incongruous as possible, something that seems too odd and unmanageable, and take it on with such abandon that it's almost impossible to stifle the giddy laughter you'll feel when you realize they pulled it off".

== Track listing ==
All compositions by Joey Baron except as indicated

1. "Blinky" - 3:18
2. "Yow" - 1:47
3. "Terra Bina Kia Jeena" (Traditional) - 6:31
4. "Guzzle" - 3:38
5. "Spoo" - 3:27
6. "But, Cake" - 5:29
7. "Archives" - 3:14
8. "The Shadow of Your Smile" (Johnny Mandel, Paul Francis Webster) - 1:39
9. "Room Service" - 4:57
10. "I Want a Little Girl" (Murray Mencher, Billy Moll) - 4:24
11. "Sandbox" - 1:38
12. "Response" - 4:09
13. "Trunk" - 2:18
14. "Go" - 3:11
15. "Scottie Pippen" - 2:21
16. "Mr. Pretension" - 0:36

== Personnel ==
- Joey Baron - drums
- Ellery Eskelin - tenor saxophone
- Steve Swell - trombone

== See also ==
- Tongue and groove
