= Elizabeth Schwartz =

American vocalist (born 1964)

- Born: 1964 (age 61–62)
- Genres: Klezmer
- Occupations: Musician, writer
- Years active: 1994 - Present
- Website: voiceofklezmer.com

Elizabeth Schwartz is an American vocalist, concentrating on klezmer music and the Romanian Yiddish dialect. She primarily records with her husband Yale Strom and Hot Pstromi but has collaborated in performance and recordings with notable musicians from the jazz and folk music worlds, notably Muzsikas, Damian Draghici, Alicia Svigals, Salman Ahmad, Marta Sebestyen and others. The subject of Romanian filmmaker Radu Gabrea's documentary film, Searching for Schwartz (2007), she was also featured in his previous documentaries "Goldfadn's Legacy" and "Romania, Romania". She also recorded music for the soundtrack of L'Chayim, Comrade Stalin!, a documentary film directed by her husband and frequent collaborator Strom.

On March 18, 2012, Schwartz was invited to become the first woman in history to sing at the 125-year-old Eldridge Street Synagogue in Manhattan, effectively breaking the ban of kol isha in this landmark cultural venue.

== Career ==
Before becoming a vocalist, she was a Hollywood film executive - companies where she worked include Simpson-Bruckheimer Films and Morra-Brezner-Steinberg-Tenenbaum. As a writer, Schwartz collaborated with Strom on "A Wandering Feast, A Journey Through the Jewish Culture of Eastern Europe" (Jossey-Bass) and contributed a chapter on klezmer vocal technique for "Shpil! The Art of Playing Klezmer" (Scarecrow Press). Also with Strom and author Ellen Kushner, she created the award-winning audio drama "The Witches of Lublin". Her subsequent audio drama, "Debs in Canton" (2021) won multiple awards including gold for excellence in writing.

=== Music ===
Elizabeth Schwartz began performing with Yale Strom and Hot Pstromi in 1996. Her first recording "Garden of Yidn", was released by Naxos World Music and appeared on Canada's Mundial Top World Music list. It was called "A landmark in modern Yiddish song" by Sing Out! Magazine and received numerous four-star reviews. She next appeared on the Naxos World CD "Cafe Jew Zoo". To date, her other recordings are "Dvekes/Adhesion", a collaboration with Yale Strom, Mark Dresser, Marty Ehrlich, Diane Moser and Benny Koonyevsky on the Global Village Music label; "Borsht with Bread Brothers" (Arc Music UK), "The Absolutely Complete Klezmer II" (Transcontinental Music), "The Devil's Brides" (Arc Music UK), "City of the Future" (Arc Music UK) and "Yale Strom's Broken Consort: Shimmering Lights" (Arc Music UK). She performs regularly with both Yale Strom & Hot Pstromi and the multifaith ensemble Common Chords, which also features Yale Strom, Salman Ahmad, Samir Chatterjee, Sunny Jain, Mark Dresser and others.

=== Writing and blogging ===
Schwartz co-wrote the audio drama "The Witches of Lublin", starring Tovah Feldshuh and the book "A Wandering Feast" with her husband and frequent collaborator, Yale Strom. She contributed a chapter on the technique of klezmer vocals for "Shpil: The Art of Playing Klezmer" (Scarecrow Press). She also wrote the award-winning audio drama "Debs in Canton" starring Philip Proctor. In 2023 she wrote "The Sweet Fragrance of Life and Other Horror Stories", published by Olniansky Tekst.

Her recipes and commentary have been featured in "A Wandering Feast", the online food magazine "The Weiser Kitchen.com" and in the Monday Morning Cooking Club's international cookbook "It's Always About the Food".

== Discography ==
- "Garden of Yidn" (Hot Pstromi & Klazzj, 2000), Naxos World
- "Cafe Jew Zoo" (Hot Pstromi, 2002), Naxos World
- "Dveykes/Adhesion" (Strom, Diane Moser, Marty Ehrlich, Mark Dresser, Benny Koonyevsky, Elizabeth Schwartz, 2006), Global Village
- "Borsht with Bread Brothers" (Hot Pstromi, 2007) Arc Music UK
- "Absolutely Klezmer, Volume II" (Hot Pstromi, 2007), Transcontinental/URJ
- "The Devil's Brides" (Hot Pstromi, 2011), Arc Music UK
- "City of the Future" (Hot Pstromi 2015), Arc Music UK
