= Arcado (album) =

Studio album by Arcado
- Released: 1989
- Recorded: February 1989
- Studio: Bauer Studios, Ludwigsburg
- Genre: Contemporary classical music, chamber jazz
- Length: 51:04
- Label: JMT; JMT 834 429
- Producer: Stefan F. Winter

Mark Dresser chronology
Arcado (1989)	Behind the Myth (1990)

Hank Roberts chronology
Miniature (1988)	Arcado (1989)	Birds of Prey (1990)

Arcado is the debut album by the Arcado String Trio, featuring violinist Mark Feldman, cellist Hank Roberts and bassist Mark Dresser. It was recorded in 1989 and released on the JMT label.

== Reception ==
The AllMusic review by Ron Wynn called it an "Intriguing, sometimes explosive, string session".

Professional ratings
Review scores
Source	Rating
AllMusic	4/5 stars

== Track listing ==
1. "Gartman's" (Mark Dresser) - 11:37
2. "Griffin' Leroy" (Mark Dresser, Hank Roberts, Mark Feldman) - 0:22
3. "Subtonium # Three" (Dresser) - 12:19
4. "Kraine" (Dresser, Roberts, Feldman) - 0:29
5. "Living Bicycles" (Roberts) - 5:49
6. "Pastoral" (Dresser, Roberts, Feldman) - 0:47
7. "Curve Ball" (Dresser) - 12:07
8. "Ethel" (Dresser, Roberts, Feldman) - 0:30
9. "West Bank Cindy"(Roberts) - 7:04

== Personnel ==
- Mark Feldman - violin
- Hank Roberts - cello
- Mark Dresser - bass
