= Behind the Myth =

Studio album by Arcado
- Released: 1991
- Recorded: March 1990
- Studio: Bauer Studios, Ludwigsburg
- Genre: Contemporary classical music, chamber jazz
- Length: 53:35
- Label: JMT; JMT 834 441
- Producer: Stefan F. Winter

Mark Dresser chronology
Arcado (1989)	Behind the Myth (1991)	For Three Strings and Orchestra (1991)

Hank Roberts chronology
Birds of Prey (1990)	Behind the Myth (1990)	I Can't Put My Finger on It (1991)

Behind the Myth is the second album by the Arcado String Trio featuring violinist Mark Feldman, cellist Hank Roberts and bassist Mark Dresser, which was recorded in 1990 and released on the JMT label.

== Reception ==
The AllMusic review by David Jeffries says, "Behind the Myth is filled with intriguing musical surprises and enough substance to make it worthy of repeat listening".

Professional ratings
Review scores
Source	Rating
AllMusic	3/5 stars
The Penguin Guide to Jazz Recordings	3.5/4 stars

== Track listing ==
1. "Ediface" (Mark Dresser) - 7:43
2. "Waterburg Trio" (Hank Roberts) - 10:26
3. "Thematica" (Dresser) - 8:39
4. "Behind the Myth" (Mark Feldman) - 12:54
5. "Kerney" (Feldman) - 8:57
6. "Somewhere" (Roberts) - 5:13

== Personnel ==
- Mark Feldman - violin
- Hank Roberts - cello
- Mark Dresser - bass
