= Jazzophone =

Saxophone-shaped trumpet

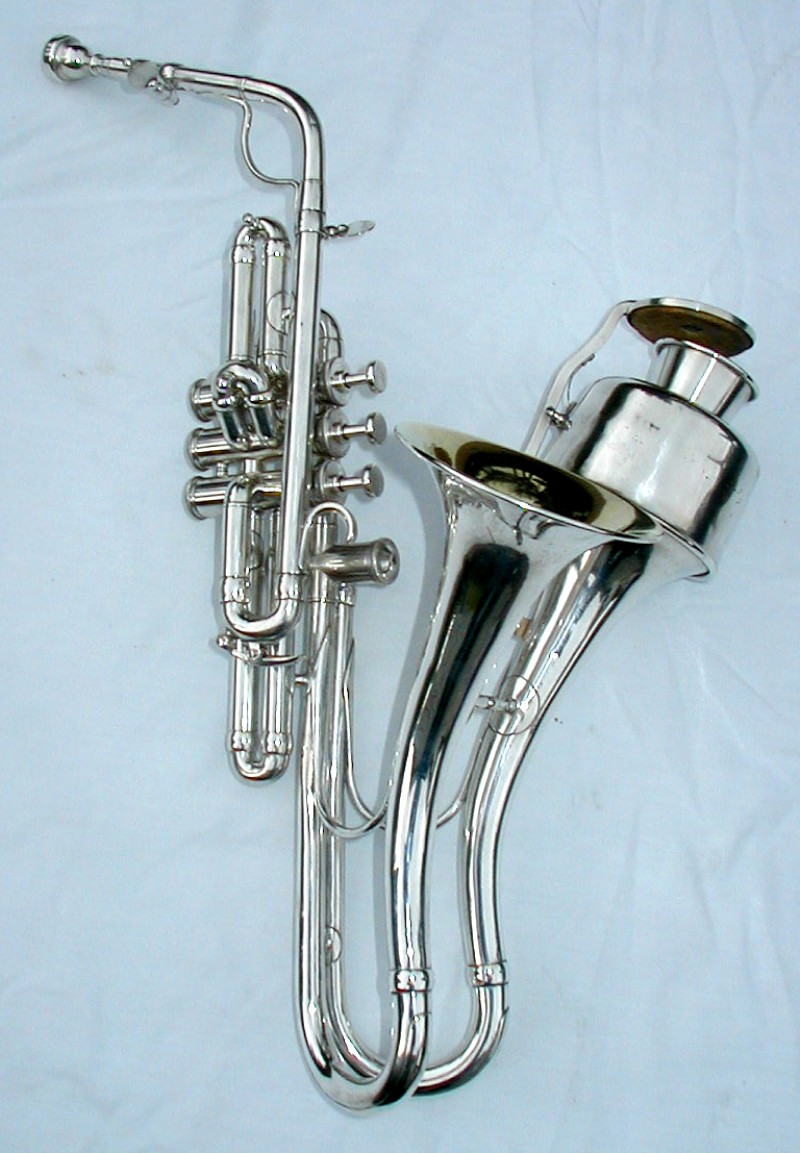
Jazzophone

The jazzophone is a comparatively rare sax-shaped double-belled Bb Trumpet, with a trumpet-like mouthpiece. One bell is left open, while the other bell uses a harmon mute with a stem on a trigger that produces a "wah-wah" type of effect.

Speculation is that the first was created in 1920, with the first known advertisement for the instrument appearing in a German magazine in 1926, but other musical experts disagree there is another form of jazzophone. Collector "Captain Kazoo" claims to own such an instrument. No specific details besides a picture are given, but it appears to be a kazoo-shaped body with a single bell. The previous mentioned jazzophone was created completely separate of the "Kazoo" model. The only common link is the name.

The instrument was featured in the songs "Get Up Off That Jazzophone" by the Bubbling Over Five band in 1929 and Bob Brown's "Mammy's Little Rolling Stone" of the same year. Cellist Hank Roberts briefly played a bowed instrument credited as a “jazz-a-phone” on Bill Frisell’s 1991 album Where in the World?. This is a unique instrument utilizing a stringed neck, a bell, and an air tube not to be confused with the jazzophone.
