= JMT Records =

German record label

- Founded: 1985
- Founder: Stefan Winter
- Defunct: 1995
- Status: Inactive
- Distributor: PolyGram
- Genre: Jazz
- Country of origin: Germany
- Location: Munich

JMT Records (an acronym of Jazz Music Today) was a German record label founded by Stefan Winter. It was based in Munich, Germany, specialized in contemporary jazz, and operated from 1985 until 1995.

== History ==
JMT released debut albums by Steve Coleman, Greg Osby, Cassandra Wilson, Jean-Paul Bourelly, and Robin Eubanks and also released early albums by Gary Thomas helping to define the M-Base concept. The label also produced early recordings of musicians associated with the New York downtown scene including Mark Feldman, Mark Dresser, Hank Roberts, Tim Berne, Uri Caine and Joey Baron. Other jazz musicians who recorded for JMT included Herb Robertson, Bob Stewart, and Craig Harris. European musicians such as Django Bates, Marc Ducret, and Peter Herborn were also part of the label's portfolio.

One of the most successful releases on JMT was John McLaughlin's Live at the Royal Festival Hall with Trilok Gurtu and Kai Eckhardt which reached number 3 in the Billboard Top Contemporary Jazz Albums chart. Drummer and composer Paul Motian released eleven albums between 1988 and 1995 on the JMT label including many with his trio featuring Joe Lovano and Bill Frisell.

In 1995, JMT was fully absorbed into PolyGram, which deleted most of the label's back catalogue. One of the label's artists, Tim Berne, stated that the majority of his work vanished.

In 1997, Stefan Winter established Winter & Winter Records and gradually re-released the JMT catalogue through the new label.

== Discography ==
Year released	Catalogue No.	Artist	Title	Notes
1985	JMT 850 001	Steve Coleman Group	Motherland Pulse	debut album as a leader
1985	JMT 850 002	Herb Robertson Quintet	Transparency	debut album as a leader
1985	JMT 850 003	Jane Ira Bloom and Fred Hersch	As One	
1986	JMT 860 004	Cassandra Wilson	Point of View	debut album as a leader
1986	JMT 860 005	Steve Coleman and Five Elements	On the Edge of Tomorrow	debut album of the band
1986	JMT 860 006	Jay Clayton and Jerry Granelli	Sound Songs	
1986	JMT 860 007	Stefan F. Winter	The Little Trumpet	instrumental suite for children by Winter ("For Petra"), arranged by Herb Robertson, featuring Roberston, Bill Frisell, Tim Berne, Robin Eubanks, and Bob Stewart
1987	JMT 870 008	Craig Harris and Tailgaters Tales	Shelter	
1987	JMT 870 009	Jean-Paul Bourelly	Jungle Cowboy	debut album as a leader
1987	JMT 870 010	Steve Coleman and Five Elements	World Expansion	subtitled (By the M-Base Neophyte)
1987	JMT 870 011	Greg Osby	Greg Osby and Sound Theatre	debut album as a leader
1987	JMT 870 012	Cassandra Wilson	Days Aweigh	
1987	JMT 870 013	Herb Robertson Quintet	X-Cerpts: Live at Willisau	
1988	JMT 880 014	Bob Stewart	First Line	debut album as leader
1988	JMT 880 015	Craig Harris and Tailgaters Tales	Blackout in the Square Root of Soul	
1988	JMT 880 016	Hank Roberts	Black Pastels	debut album as leader
1988	JMT 880 017	Peter Herborn	Peter Herborn's Acute Insights	
1988	JMT 834 418	various artists	For Real Moments Songs and Dances	compilation featuring Greg Osby, Cassandra Wilson, Craig Harris, Bob Stewart, Steve Coleman & Hank Roberts
1988	JMT 834 419	Cassandra Wilson	Blue Skies	
1988	JMT 834 420	Herb Robertson Brass Ensemble	Shades of Bud Powell	
1988	JMT 834 421	Paul Motian	Monk in Motian	with Joe Lovano and Bill Frisell with Geri Allen and Dewey Redman as guests
1988	JMT 834 422	Greg Osby	Mindgames	
1988	JMT 834 423	Miniature	Miniature	first album of the trio by Joey Baron, Tim Berne & Hank Roberts
1989	JMT 834 424	Robin Eubanks	Different Perspectives	debut album as leader
1989	JMT 834 425	Strata Institute	Cipher Syntax	sole album by double trio led by Steve Coleman and Greg Osby
1989	JMT 834 426	Cold Sweat	Cold Sweat Plays J. B.	James Brown tribute led by Craig Harris (first of two albums by the band)
1989	JMT 834 427	Bob Stewart's First Line Band	Goin' Home	
1989	JMT 834 428	Geri Allen, Charlie Haden & Paul Motian	In the Year of the Dragon	
1989	JMT 834 429	Arcado String Trio	Arcado	first album of the trio by Mark Dresser, Mark Feldman & Hank Roberts
1989	JMT 834 430	Paul Motian	On Broadway Volume 1	
1989	JMT 834 431	Tim Berne	Tim Berne's Fractured Fairy Tales	
1989	JMT 834 432	Gary Thomas & Seventh Quadrant	By Any Means Necessary	first of six albums by Thomas released on JMT
1989	JMT 834 433	Robin Eubanks & Steve Turre	Dedication	
1990	JMT 834 434	Cassandra Wilson	Jumpworld	
1990	JMT 834 435	Greg Osby	Season of Renewal	
1990	JMT 834 436	John McLaughlin Trio	Live at the Royal Festival Hall	
1990	JMT 834 437	Hank Roberts	Birds of Prey	
1990	JMT 834 438	various artists	The Best of Jazz Music Today	compilation featuring Cassandra Wilson, Robin Eubanks, Geri Allen, Tim Berne, Hank Roberts, Greg Osby, Gary Thomas, John McLaughlin, & Paul Motian
1990	JMT 834 439	Gary Thomas	While the Gate Is Open	
1990	JMT 834 440	Paul Motian	On Broadway Volume 2	
1990	JMT 834 441	Arcado String Trio	Behind the Myth	
1991	JMT 834 442	Tim Berne's Caos Totale	Pace Yourself	
1991	JMT 834 443	Cassandra Wilson	She Who Weeps	
1991	JMT 834 444	Cold Sweat	4 Play	
1991	JMT 834 445	Paul Motian	Bill Evans	
1991	JMT 834 446	Robin Eubanks	Karma	
1991	JMT 849 147	Miniature	I Can't Put My Finger on It	
1992	JMT 849 148	Marc Ducret	News from the Front	
1991	JMT 849 149	Cassandra Wilson	Live	
1991	JMT 849 150	Herb Robertson	Certified	
1991	JMT 849 151	Gary Thomas	The Kold Kage	
1992	JMT 849 152	Arcado String Trio	For Three Strings and Orchestra	with the Kölner Rundfunk Orchester conducted by David de Villiers
1992	JMT 849 153	Marc Johnson	Right Brain Patrol	
1992	JMT 849 154	Paul Motian	Motian in Tokyo	with Bill Frisell and Joe Lovano
1992	JMT 849 155	Christy Doran, Mark Helias, Bobby Previte & Gary Thomas	Corporate Art	
1992	JMT 849 156	Peter Herborn	Something Personal	
1992	JMT 849 157	Paul Motian	On Broadway Volume 3	
1992	JMT 849 158	Joey Baron	Tongue in Groove	first album as leader
1992	JMT 514 000	Gary Thomas	Till We Have Faces	
1992	JMT 514 001	Cassandra Wilson	After the Beginning Again	
1992	JMT 514 002	Peter Herborn	Traces of Trane	
1992	JMT 514 003	Tim Berne	Diminutive Mysteries (Mostly Hemphill)	
1993	JMT 514 004	Paul Motian	Paul Motian and the Electric Bebop Band	
1993	JMT 514 005	Hank Roberts	Little Motor People	
1993	JMT 514 006	Gabrielle Goodman	Travelin' Light	debut album
1993	JMT 514 007	Uri Caine	Sphere Music	debut album
1993	JMT 514 008	Django Bates	Summer Fruits (and Unrest)	
1993	JMT 514 009	Gary Thomas	Exile's Gate	
1994	JMT 514 010	various artists	Flashback on M-Base	compilation featuring Steve Coleman, Robin Eubanks, Greg Osby & Cassandra Wilson
1994	JMT 514 011	various artists	Almost Normal	compilation featuring Django Bates, Tim Berne, Gary Thomas, Gabrielle Goodman, John McLaughlin, Hank Roberts, Miniature, Uri Caine, Cassandra Wilson, Corporate Art & Paul Motian
1994	JMT 514 012	Paul Motian Trio	Trioism	
1994	JMT 514 013	Tim Berne's Caos Totale	Nice View	
1994	JMT 514 014	Django Bates	Autumn Fires (and Green Shoots)	
1994	JMT 514 015	Gabrielle Goodman	Until We Love	
1994	JMT 514 016	Paul Motian and the Electric Bebop Band	Reincarnation of a Love Bird	
1994	JMT 514 017	Robin Eubanks	Mental Images	
1995	JMT 514 018	Marc Johnson's Right Brain Patrol	Magic Labyrinth	
1995	JMT 514 019	Tim Berne's Bloodcount	Lowlife: The Paris Concert	
1995	JMT 514 020	Tim Berne's Bloodcount	Poisoned Minds: The Paris Concert	
1995	JMT 514 021	Tethered Moon	Tethered Moon Play Kurt Weill	Masabumi Kikuchi, Gary Peacock & Paul Motian
1995	JMT 514 022	Uri Caine	Toys	
1995	JMT 514 023	Django Bates	Winter Truce (and Homes Blaze)	
1995	JMT 514 024	Gary Thomas	Overkill	
1995	JMT 514 025	various artists	Guitar Music	compilation featuring John Scofield, Kurt Rosenwinkel, Wolfgang Muthspiel, Pat Metheny, Jean-Paul Bourelly, Kelvyn Bell, Kevin Eubanks, John McLaughlin, Marc Ducret & Bill Frisell
1995	JMT 514 026	Cassandra Wilson	Songbook	compilation, after six albums for JMT, Wilson went to Blue Note
1995	JMT 514 027	Stefan F. Winter	The Little Trumpet	reissue of JMT 860 007
1995	JMT 514 028	Paul Motian Trio	At the Village Vanguard	subtitled You Took the Words Right Out of My Heart
1995	JMT 514 029	Tim Berne's Bloodcount	Memory Select: The Paris Concert	

== See also ==
- List of record labels
