= For Three Strings and Orchestra =

Studio album by Arcado
- Released: 1991
- Recorded: June 1991
- Studio: WDR Studio, Cologne
- Genre: Contemporary classical music, chamber jazz
- Length: 66:19
- Label: JMT; JMT 849 152
- Producer: Ulrich Kurth

Mark Dresser chronology
Behind the Myth (1990)	For Three Strings and Orchestra (1991)	The Cabinet of Dr. Caligari (1993)

Hank Roberts chronology
I Can't Put My Finger on It (1991)	For Three Strings and Orchestra (1991)	Little Motor People (1992)

For Three Strings and Orchestra is the third album by the Arcado String Trio (violinist Mark Feldman, cellist Hank Roberts and bassist Mark Dresser) featuring the Kölner Rundfunk Orchester which was recorded in 1991 and released on the JMT label.

== Reception ==
AllMusic awarded the album 3 stars.

Professional ratings
Review scores
Source	Rating
AllMusic	3/5 stars
The Penguin Guide to Jazz Recordings	3/4 stars

== Track listing ==
1. "For Not the Law" (Mark Dresser) - 17:18
2. "It's a Free Country, Isn't It?" (Hank Roberts) - 15:04
3. "In Cold Moonlight" (Manfred Niehaus) - 12:06
4. "Naked Singularities" (Mark Feldman) - 21:51

== Personnel ==
- Mark Feldman - violin
- Hank Roberts - cello
- Mark Dresser - bass
- Kölner Rundfunk Orchester conducted by David de Villiers
