= Nice View =

Nice View may refer to:

- Nice View (album), a 1993 album
- Nice View (film), a 2022 film
