= X-Cerpts: Live at Willisau =

Live album by Herb Robertson Quintet
- Released: 1987
- Recorded: January 31, 1987; Mohren, Willisau, Switzerland
- Genre: Jazz
- Length: 67:27
- Label: JMT; JMT 870 013
- Producer: Stefan F. Winter

Herb Robertson chronology
Transparency (1985)	X-Cerpts: Live at Willisau (1987)	Shades of Bud Powell (1988)

X-Cerpts: Live at Willisau is the second album led by trumpeter Herb Robertson which was recorded and released in 1987 on the JMT label.

== Reception ==
AllMusic awarded the album 3 stars.

Professional ratings
Review scores
Source	Rating
AllMusic	3/5 stars
The Penguin Guide to Jazz Recordings	3/4 stars

== Track listing ==
All compositions by Herb Robertson

1. "Jiffy Jester Jig (Part 1, 2 & 3) Lulla" - 27:28
2. "Karmic Ramifications: Vibration/Formation/Dissipation/Transformation" - 31:28
3. "Flocculus" - 8:24

== Personnel ==
- Herb Robertson - trumpet, flugelhorn, pocket trumpet, cornet
- Tim Berne - alto saxophone
- Gust William Tsilis - vibraphone
- Lindsay Horner - bass
- Joey Baron - drums
