= Affinities (album) =

Live album by Marilyn Crispell and Gerry Hemingway
- Released: 2011
- Recorded: March 14, 2009, and October 19, 2010
- Venue: An Die Musik, Baltimore, Maryland and Levontin 7, Tel Aviv, Israel
- Genre: Free Jazz
- Length: 58:25
- Label: Intakt Records; CD 177
- Producer: Gerry Hemingway, Intakt Records, Marilyn Crispell

Affinities is a live album by pianist Marilyn Crispell and drummer Gerry Hemingway. Five tracks were recorded in Baltimore, Maryland in March 2009, while the remaining tracks were recorded in Tel Aviv, Israel in October 2010. The album was released in 2011 by Intakt Records.

== Reception ==
Professional ratings
Review scores
Source	Rating
The Guardian	3/5 stars

In a review for The Guardian, John Fordham wrote: "this live recording... finds the pianist back in spontaneous synchronicity with former Braxton drummer Gerry Hemingway, and it's much more of a balance between her reflective and intensely full-on playing... After a long break from each other, Crispell and Hemingway once again sound joined at the hip."

A review at DeSingel states: "Hearing is believing - the more one listens, the more one is able to connect with the two musicians in exploring untrodden musical paths. Passion and intuitive dialogue between piano and drums bring out unheard-of and flexible details in the ensemble playing. The bond revolves around alertness and an open mind... It is not so much a question of time standing still, but rather of the moment being endlessly drawn out."

== Track listing ==
"Air" composed by Frank Kimbrough. Remaining tracks composed by Marilyn Crispell and Gerry Hemingway.

1. "Shear Shift" – 14:10
2. "Axial Flows" – 8:01
3. "Starlings" – 10:29
4. "Threadings" – 8:27
5. "Air" – 7:47
6. "Permeations" – 3:55
7. "Finis" – 5:34
- Tracks 1, 2, 4, 5, and 7 recorded on March 14, 2009, at An Die Musik, Baltimore, Maryland. Tracks 3 and 6 recorded on October 19, 2010, at Levontin 7, Tel Aviv, Israel.

== Personnel ==
- Marilyn Crispell – piano
- Gerry Hemingway – drums, percussion, vibraphone
