= Is That You? =

Studio album by Bill Frisell
- Released: 1990
- Recorded: August 1989
- Studio: Ironwood Studios, Seattle
- Genre: Downtown music
- Length: 49:33
- Label: Elektra Nonesuch
- Producer: Wayne Horvitz

Bill Frisell chronology
Before We Were Born (1989)	Is That You? (1990)	Where in the World? (1991)

Is That You? is the second album by Bill Frisell to be released on the Elektra Nonesuch label. It was released in 1990 and features performances by Frisell, keyboardist Wayne Horvitz and drummer Joey Baron, who were all members of Naked City at this time.

== Reception ==
The AllMusic review by Brian Olewnick stated, "Is That You? finds the guitarist already trending away from that band's scattershot assault and toward the more pastoral leanings he would embrace in the upcoming decade".

Professional ratings
Review scores
Source	Rating
AllMusic	3/5 stars
The Penguin Guide to Jazz Recordings	3/4 stars

== Track listing ==
All compositions by Bill Frisell except as indicated.

1. "No Man's Land" - 6:40
2. "Someone in My Backyard" - 2:45
3. "Rag" - 4:00
4. "Is That You?" - 6:50
5. "The Way Home" - 6:00
6. "Twenty Years" - 2:43
7. "Chain of Fools" (Covay) - 3:30
8. "Hello Nellie" - 4:07
9. "The Days of Wine and Roses" (Mancini, Mercer) - 3:35
10. "Yuba City" (Horvitz)- 5:42
11. "Half a Million" - 4:00
12. "Hope and Fear" - 1:06

== Personnel ==
- Bill Frisell: electric and acoustic guitars, bass, banjo, ukulele, clarinet
- Wayne Horvitz: keyboards, drum programming, momentary bass
- Joey Baron: drums
- Dave Hofstra: tuba on 4 & 8, bass on 7
