= Five Compositions (Quartet) 1986 =

Studio album by Anthony Braxton
- Released: 1986
- Recorded: July 2–3, 1986
- Studio: Barigozzi Studio in Milano, Italy
- Genre: Jazz
- Length: 42:25
- Label: Black Saint
- Producer: Giovanni Bonandrini

Anthony Braxton chronology
Quartet (Coventry) 1985 (1985)	Five Compositions (Quartet) 1986 (1986)	The Aggregate (1986)

Five Compositions (Quartet) 1986 is an album by American saxophonist and composer Anthony Braxton recorded in 1986 for the Italian Black Saint label.

== Reception ==
The Allmusic review by Stephen Cook awarded the album 4½ stars stating "By the time of this mid-'80s quartet date, Braxton was just starting to get better compensated for his music and was also formalizing his heady compositional formula; this advance was helped along considerably by his stellar quartet... Knotty music to be sure, but some of Braxton's most rewarding".

Professional ratings
Review scores
Source	Rating
Allmusic	4.5/5 stars
The Penguin Guide to Jazz Recordings	3.5/4 stars

== Track listing ==
All compositions by Anthony Braxton.

1. "Composition No. 131" - 6:45
2. "Composition No. 99" - 5:50
3. "Composition No. 124" - 9:05
4. "Composition No. 122" - 9:20
5. "Composition No. 101" - 11:25

== Personnel ==
- Anthony Braxton - flute, clarinet, alto saxophone, tenor saxophone, C melody saxophone, sopranino saxophone
- David Rosenboom - piano
- Mark Dresser - bass
- Gerry Hemingway - percussion
