= Pace Yourself =

Studio album by Tim Berne's Caos Totale
- Released: 1991
- Recorded: November 1990
- Studio: Bauer Studios, Ludwigsburg, Germany
- Genre: Jazz
- Length: 70:12
- Label: JMT; JMT 824 442
- Producer: Stefan F. Winter & Caos Totale

Tim Berne chronology
Tim Berne's Fractured Fairy Tales (1990)	Pace Yourself (1991)	I Can't Put My Finger on It (1991)

Pace Yourself is an album by saxophonist Tim Berne's Caos Totale, recorded in 1990 and released on the JMT label.

== Reception ==
The AllMusic review by Brian Olewnick states, "Pace Yourself finds Berne's Caos Totale sextet exploring his rich, multi-layered compositions in depth and at length. Berne's pieces, especially his longer, episodic ones, tend to take unexpected twists and turns; you'll find very little of the traditional "head-solos-head" song structure here. Though most of his themes have a blues base, they emerge and disappear in conformity with their own logic, not a pre-existing formula".

Professional ratings
Review scores
Source	Rating
AllMusic	3.5/5 stars
The Penguin Guide to Jazz Recordings	3/4 stars

== Track listing ==
All compositions by Tim Berne

1. "Bass Voodoo" - 9:57
2. "The Noose" - 7:36
3. "The Usual" - 8:18
4. "Sam's Dilemma" - 13:36
5. "The Legend of P-1" - 26:24
6. "Luna" - 4:31

== Personnel ==
- Tim Berne - alto saxophone
- Herb Robertson - trumpet, cornet, flutes, flugelhorn, balloon, whistles, vocals
- Steve Swell - trombone
- Marc Ducret - electric guitar, fretless electric guitar
- Mark Dresser - bass, bungy giffus
- Bobby Previte - drums, music manuscript
