= Black Pastels =

Studio album by Hank Roberts
- Released: 1988
- Recorded: November & December 1987
- Studio: RPM Studios, New York City
- Genre: Jazz
- Length: 49:04
- Label: JMT; JMT 880 016
- Producer: Stefan F. Winter

Hank Roberts chronology
Black Pastels (1988)	Miniature (1989)

Black Pastels is the debut album by cellist Hank Roberts which was recorded in 1987 and released on the JMT label.

== Reception ==
The AllMusic review by Scott Yanow said it was "Recommended to open-eared listeners who have a strong sense of humor".

Professional ratings
Review scores
Source	Rating
AllMusic	4.5/5 stars

== Track listing ==
All compositions by Hank Roberts

1. "Black Pastels" - 7:54
2. "Jamil" - 4:58
3. "Mountain Speaks" - 2:17
4. "Rain Village" - 2:00
5. "Choqueno" - 7:54
6. "This Quietness" - 4:15
7. "Granpappy's Barn Dance Death Dance" - 10:22
8. "Scarecrow Shakedown" - 3:21
9. "Lucky's Lament" - 6:01

== Personnel ==
- Hank Roberts - cello, voices, classical 12-string guitar, jazz-a-phone fiddle
- Tim Berne - alto saxophone
- Ray Anderson, Robin Eubanks - trombone
- Dave Taylor - bass trombone
- Bill Frisell - guitar, acoustic 12-string guitar, banjo
- Joey Baron - drums, percussion
- Mark Dresser - double bass (track 9)
