= L'Chayim, Comrade Stalin! =

2002 American documentary film

L'Chayim, Comrade Stalin
- Directed by: Yale Strom
- Written by: Elizabeth Schwartz
- Narrated by: Ron Perlman
- Release date: 2002
- Country: United States
- Language: English

L'Chayim, Comrade Stalin! is a 2002 documentary film directed by Yale Strom and narrated by Ron Perlman.

== Overview ==
L'Chayim, Comrade Stalin! covers the topic of Joseph Stalin's creation of the Jewish Autonomous Oblast and its partial settlement by thousands of Russian- and Yiddish-speaking Jews.

== Awards ==
In 2005 awarded bronze statuette of the Warsaw Phoenix at the Jewish Motifs International Film Festival in Warsaw, Poland.
