= Before We Were Born =

Studio album by Bill Frisell
- Released: 1989
- Recorded: August–September 1988
- Genre: Jazz, post-bop, downtown music
- Length: 49:33
- Label: Elektra/Musician
- Producer: Lee Townsend

Bill Frisell chronology
Lookout for Hope (1988)	Before We Were Born (1989)	Is That You? (1990)

Before We Were Born is the first album by Bill Frisell to be released on the Elektra Nonesuch label. It was released in 1989 and features performances by Frisell, cellist Hank Roberts, bassist Kermit Driscoll and drummer Joey Baron. Guests include guitarist Arto Lindsay, keyboardist Peter Scherer, alto saxophonist Julius Hemphill and baritone saxophonist Doug Wieselman.

== Reception ==
The AllMusic review by Scott Yanow stated: "Bill Frisell has been one of the most unique jazz-based guitarists of the 1980s and '90s, a very eclectic player who can switch styles and sounds on a moment's notice, yet is always quite distinctive. On this atmospheric and picturesque set, Frisell uses his regular quartet of the time (cellist Hank Roberts, bassist Kermit Driscoll and drummer Joey Baron) on some selections, but also interacts with fellow guitarist Arto Lindsay, keyboardist Peter Scherer and, on 'Some Song and Dance', baritonist Doug Wieselman and both Julius Hemphill and Billy Drewes on altos... A very intriguing and colorful set of eccentric music."

Professional ratings
Review scores
Source	Rating
AllMusic	3.5/5 stars
Hi-Fi News & Record Review	A*:2
The Penguin Guide to Jazz Recordings	3/4 stars

== Track listing ==
All songs composed by Bill Frisell except as noted.

1. "Before We Were Born" – 6:51
2. "Some Song and Dance: Freddy's Step" – 3:06
3. "Some Song and Dance: Love Motel" – 6:49
4. "Some Song and Dance: Pip, Squeak" – 5:28
5. "Some Song and Dance: Goodbye" – 1:43
6. "Hard Plains Drifter" – 13:24
7. "The Lone Ranger" – 7:34
8. "Steady, Girl" (Music, Frisell; lyrics, Arto Lindsay) – 2:10

== Personnel ==
- Bill Frisell - banjo (2–5), acoustic and electric guitars, pedals
- Arto Lindsay - electric guitar (1, 7, 8), voice (8)
- Peter Scherer - keyboards (1, 7), drum programming (1), keyboard bass (8)
- Joey Baron - drums
- Hank Roberts - cello (2–5, 6), voice (6)
- Kermit Driscoll - electric bass guitar (2–5, 6)
- Julius Hemphill, Billy Drewes - alto saxophones (2–5)
- Doug Wieselman - baritone saxophone (2–5)
- Cyro Baptista - shakers (7)

Arrangement

- Tracks 1, 7, 8 arr. Bill Frisell, Peter Scherer, and Arto Lindsay
- Tracks 2–5 arr. Bill Frisell
- Track 6 arr. John Zorn

Production

- Tracks 2–5 produced by Lee Townsend
- Track 6 produced by John Zorn
- Tracks 1, 7 and 8 produced by Peter Scherer and Arto Lindsay
- Album produced by Lee Townsend
