= Quartet (Coventry) 1985 =

Live album by Anthony Braxton
- Released: 1987, 1993
- Recorded: November 26, 1985
- Venue: Warwick Arts Centre, Coventry, England
- Genre: Jazz
- Length: 144:23
- Label: Leo; LR 204/205
- Producer: Leo Feigin

Anthony Braxton chronology
Quartet (Birmingham) 1985 (1985)	Quartet (Coventry) 1985 (1987)	Five Compositions (Quartet) 1986 (1986)

Quartet (Coventry) 1985 is a live album by composer and saxophonist Anthony Braxton recorded in England in 1985, first released in heavily edited and unauthorized form on the West Wind label and later reissued in full and authorized form on the Leo label as a double CD in 1993.

== Reception ==
Professional ratings
Review scores
Source	Rating
Allmusic	3/5 stars
The Penguin Guide to Jazz Recordings	4/4 stars

The Allmusic review by Stewart Mason stated "What makes this two-disc set stand out above the others in the series of live reissues from this tour is that each disc includes a half-hour interview between Braxton and Graham Lock (who also wrote the album's liner notes), an enlightening, free-ranging discussion that covers Braxton's influences, concepts, and techniques".

== Track listing ==
All compositions by Anthony Braxton.

Disc one

1. First set - 42:05
  1. "Composition 124 (+30+96)"
  2. "Composition 88 (+108C+30+96)"
  3. "Piano Solo from Composition 30"
  4. "Composition 23G (+30+96)"
  5. "Composition 40N"
2. Interview by Graham Lock - 31:52

Disc two

1. Second set - 40:35
  1. "Composition 69C (+32+96)"
  2. "Percussion Solo from Composition 96"
  3. "Composition 69F"
  4. "Composition 69B"
  5. "Bass Solo from Composition 96"
  6. "Composition 6A"
2. Interview by Graham Lock - 29:45

== Personnel ==
- Anthony Braxton- clarinet, flute, alto saxophone, C melody saxophone, sopranino saxophone
- Marilyn Crispell - piano
- Mark Dresser - bass
- Gerry Hemingway - drums
