= Circles (Marilyn Crispell album) =

Live album by Marilyn Crispell
- Released: 1991
- Recorded: October 7, 1990
- Venue: 8th Festival International De Musique Actuelle De Victoriaville, Victoriaville, Canada
- Genre: Free jazz
- Label: Les Disques Victo; VICTO CD 012
- Producer: Michel Levasseur

Circles is a live album by pianist Marilyn Crispell. It was recorded at the 8th Festival International De Musique Actuelle De Victoriaville in Victoriaville, Canada in October 1990, and was released in 1991 by Les Disques Victo. On the album, Crispell is joined by saxophonists Oliver Lake and Peter Buettner, bassist Reggie Workman, and drummer Gerry Hemingway.

== Reception ==
Professional ratings
Review scores
Source	Rating
AllMusic	4/5 stars
The Penguin Guide to Jazz	3/4 stars

In a review for AllMusic, François Couture wrote: "The Crispell/Workman/Hemingway unit is tightly locked, but strangely it is the two saxophonists who inherited most of the melodies. 'Rituel' begins on a slow free improvisational crescendo. It turns into cathartic mayhem before a compositional structure becomes apparent. The other pieces are more restrained and planned, showing Crispell's taste for the romantically solemn. 'Chant' is built on a short leitmotiv reiterated by the saxes throughout the ten minutes or so of the piece... Circles has its moments, but it stands far from Crispell's best efforts."

The authors of the Penguin Guide to Jazz Recordings awarded the album 3 stars, and stated: "Four long compositions which move into free territory before revealing their structure. Unusual at this period to hear Crispell work with horns... one... senses a certain desire to keep out of the front line and concentrate on shaping the inner contours of quite turbulent music... The chemistry with Workman and Hemingway is fresh and fissile."

== Track listing ==
All compositions by Marilyn Crispell.

1. "Rituel" – 23:09
2. "Sorrow" – 9:09
3. "Circles" – 10:15
4. "Chant" – 11:21
- Recorded at the 8th Festival International De Musique Actuelle De Victoriaville in Victoriaville, Canada on October 7, 1990.

== Personnel ==
- Marilyn Crispell – piano
- Oliver Lake – alto saxophone
- Peter Buettner – tenor saxophone
- Reggie Workman – bass
- Gerry Hemingway – drums
