= Hot Pstromi =

American klezmer ensemble

Yale Strom and Hot Pstromi is a U.S.-based klezmer ensemble that was started in 1982.

The original line up was Strom (violin), Andy Statman (clarinet and mandolin), Mark Dresser (bass), Ismail Butera (accordion) and Seido Salifoski (percussion). Concurrently, Strom led a klezmer ensemble based in California, originally called Zmiros, later Klazzj. Members included Jeff Pekarek, Fred Benedetti, Tripp Sprague, Gene Perry. Since 2006, both ensembles have been called Yale Strom & Hot Pstromi, but the website's lineup reflects the current New York based lineup: Peter Stan (accordion), Norbert Stachel (Eb, Bb, and bass clarinets, C and bass flutes, soprano & tenor saxophones, oboe, English Horn, ethnic winds), Elizabeth Schwartz (vocals), Sprocket (bass), Klezmatics co-founder David Licht (percussion) and Strom (violin and bandleader). Other artists appear as featured guests on the ensemble's 21st Century recordings, including panflutist Damian Draghici, Andy Statman, accordionist Lou Fanucchi, accordionist Ismail Butera, bassist Marty Confurius, bassist Mark Dresser, bassist Jim Whitney, trumpeter Bud Burridge, percussionists Benny Koonyevsky and Jim Mussen, pianist Diane Moser, Klezmatics co-founder Lorin Sklamberg, tsimbl player Alexander Fedoriouk and others.

In October 2012, the ensemble released the book "Shpil: The Art of Playing Klezmer" (Scarecrow Press), a book that includes not only instruction for the individual - professional and amateur enthusiast - but a detailed history, suggested recordings and bibliography, and personalized instruction for violin (Yale Strom), accordion (Peter Stan), bass (Jeff Pekarek, from Strom's West Coast ensemble), reeds (Norbert Stachel), percussion (David Licht) and a rare chapter on how to sing klezmer vocals (Elizabeth Schwartz). What sets Hot Pstromi apart from other klezmer bands is much of the repertoire comes from Strom's many years of ethnographic research he has conducted in Eastern Europe. Many of the klezmer melodies and Yiddish songs come from Jews and Roma who played before and after the Holocaust that Strom interviewed and performed with. Strom's academic research can be found in his books: "The Book of Klezmer: The History, The Music, The Folklore from the 14th Century to the 21st, "Shpil: The Art of Playing Klezmer," "Dave Tarras: The King of Klezmer,"Kessler, Jack, and "The Absolutely Complete Klezmer Songbook."

== Discography ==
- "In The Streets" (Zmiros, 1982), Gogl-Mogl Records
- "Cholent With Huckleberry" (Zmiros, 1985), (Jeff Pekarek, Fred Benedetti), Rounder Records
- "Eclectic Klezz" (Zmiros, 1988), (Fred Benedetti, Bert Turetzky, Mark Dresser), Global Village
- "Hot Pstromi: With A Little Horseradish on the Side" (Ismail Butera, Seido Salifoski, Andy Statman) (Hot Pstromi, 1991), Global Village
- "The Last Klezmer" (Hot Pstromi, 1994), (Leo Chelyapov, Lou Fanucchi, Fred Benedetti, Jeff Pekarek) Global Village
- "Wandering Jew" (Klazzj, 1995), (Jeff Pekarek, Fred Benedetti, Lou Fanuchhi, Damian Draghaci) Global VillageWorks
- "Carpati: 50 Miles, 50 Years" (Norbert Stachel, Fred Benedetti, Jeff Pekarek, Peter Stan) (Hot Pstromi, 1996), Global Village
- "Tales Our Fathers Sang" (Fred Benedetti, Jeff Pekarek, Norbert Stachel, Peter Stan, Gene Perry) (Hot Pstromi, 1998), Global Village
- "Garden of Yidn" (Hot Pstromi & Klazzj, 2000), (Tripp Sprague, Jeff Pekarek, Fred Benedetti, Elizabeth Schwartz) Naxos World
- "Cafe Jew Zoo" (Norbert Stachel, Peter Stan, Elizabeth Schwartz, Mark Dresser) (Hot Pstromi, 2002), Naxos World
- "Dveykes/Adhesion" (Strom, Diane Moser, Marty Ehrlich, Mark Dresser, Benny Koonyevsky, Elizabeth Schwartz, 2006), Global Village
- "The Absolutely Complete Introduction to Klezmer" (Peter Stan, Norbert Stachel, Jim Whitney) (Hot Pstromi, 2006), Transcontinental/URJ
- "Borsht with Bread Brothers" (David Licht, Peter Stan, Norbert Stachel, Elizabeth Schwartz), (Hot Pstromi, 2007) Arc Music UK
- "Absolutely Klezmer, Volume II" (Peter Stan, Norbert Stachel, Elizabeth Schwartz, Jim Whitney),(Hot Pstromi, 2007), Transcontinental/URJ
- "The Devil's Brides" (Peter Stan, Elizabeth Schwartz, Sprocket), (Hot Pstromi 2011) Arc Music UK
- "City of the Future: Yiddish Songs from the Former Soviet Union" (Elizabeth Schwartz, Vera Lozinsky, Judy Bressler, Norbert Stachel, Peter Stan, Duncan Moore, Jack Falk, Anthony Russell, Daniel Kahn, Michael Alpert) (Hot Pstromi 2015) Arc Music UK
- "Yale Strom's Broken Consort: Shimmering Lights" (Sara Caswell, David Wallace, Amos Hoffman, Fred Benedetti, Jeff Pekarek, Elizabeth Schwartz, Alex Greenbaum) (2018) Arc Music UK

"The Wolf and The Lamb: Live from the Shach" (Norbert Stachel, Peter Stan, Elizabeth Schwartz, Petr Dvorsky, Sasha Yasinski, Yale Strom), (Hot Pstromi 2023) Naxos/Arc Music UK
