= Lookout for Hope (Bill Frisell album) =

Studio album by the Bill Frisell Band
- Released: 1988
- Recorded: March 1987
- Studio: Power Station, New York City
- Genre: Jazz fusion
- Length: 44:31
- Label: ECM 1350
- Producer: Lee Townsend

Bill Frisell chronology
Smash & Scatteration (1985)	Lookout for Hope (1988)	Before We Were Born (1989)

Lookout for Hope is an album by the Bill Frisell Band, recorded in March 1987 and released on ECM the following year—Frisell's third album as leader. The quartet features cellist and vocalist Hank Roberts and rhythm section Kermit Driscoll and Joey Baron.

== Reception ==
The AllMusic review by Michael G. Nastos stated: "With Lookout for Hope, Bill Frisell is not so much setting trends and fashion as he is establishing a fresh sound, utterly unique from all others, and laying a foundation for many things to come."

Professional ratings
Review scores
Source	Rating
AllMusic	4/5 stars
The Penguin Guide to Jazz Recordings	3.5/4 stars
The Rolling Stone Album Guide	4/5 stars

== Track listing ==
All compositions by Bill Frisell except as indicated.

1. "Lookout for Hope" – 6:30
2. "Little Brother Bobby" – 7:04
3. "Hangdog" – 2:26
4. "Remedios the Beauty" – 6:23
5. "Lonesome" – 4:40
6. "Melody for Jack" – 3:28
7. "Hackensack" (Monk) – 2:57
8. "Little Bigger" – 3:16
9. "The Animal Race" – 2:02
10. "Alien Prints" – 6:28

== Personnel ==
=== The Bill Frisell Band ===
- Bill Frisell – electric and acoustic guitars, banjo
- Hank Roberts – cello and voice
- Kermit Driscoll – bass
- Joey Baron – drums
