= Miniature (album) =

Studio album by Joey Baron, Tim Berne & Hank Roberts
- Released: 1988
- Recorded: March 1988
- Studio: RPM Sound Studios, New York City
- Genre: Jazz
- Length: 53:47
- Label: JMT; JMT 834 423
- Producer: Stefan F. Winter, Miniature

Tim Berne chronology
Sanctified Dreams (1988)	Miniature (1988)	Tim Berne's Fractured Fairy Tales (1990)

Hank Roberts chronology
Black Pastels (1987)	Miniature (1988)	Arcado (1989)

Miniature is an album by drummer Joey Baron, saxophonist Tim Berne and cellist Hank Roberts, who would become known as Miniature, which was recorded in 1988 and released on the JMT label.

== Reception ==
Professional ratings
Review scores
Source	Rating
The Penguin Guide to Jazz	3/4 stars

The Penguin Guide to Jazz said, "Baron's drumming and occasional electronic flourishes provide its most pleasures though Berne and the tricksterish Roberts play their parts as well".

== Track listing ==
All compositions by Tim Berne except as indicated

1. "Ethiopian Boxer" (Hank Roberts) - 7:18
2. "Circular Prairie Song (For Bill Frisell)" 2:35
3. "Hong Kong Sad Song" - 8:44
4. "Lonely Mood" (Joey Baron) - 8:03
5. "'Narlin'" - 6:09
6. "Peanut" (Baron) - 6:28
7. "Abeetah (For Jake and Mary)" (Roberts) - 4:46
8. "Sanctuary" - 9:17

== Personnel ==
- Tim Berne - alto saxophone
- Hank Roberts - cello, voice
- Joey Baron - drums, synthesizer
