= Barbeque Dog =

Studio album by Ronald Shannon Jackson and The Decoding Society
- Released: 1983
- Recorded: March 1983
- Studio: Jam, London, England
- Genre: Free jazz
- Length: 38:55
- Label: Antilles; AN 1015
- Producer: David Breskin, Ronald Shannon Jackson

Ronald Shannon Jackson chronology
Mandance (1982)	Barbeque Dog (1983)	Decode Yourself (1985)

Barbeque Dog is an album by Ronald Shannon Jackson and The Decoding Society, recorded in 1983 for the Antilles label. The album cover was designed by Eiko Ishioka.

In 2020, a remastered edition (subtitled "The Live Album VS The Original") was issued on a Bandcamp page, featuring a "Live Jam" plus versions of "Gossip," "Barbecue Dog," and "Trials of Honest John" alternating with the original versions.

== Reception ==
Professional ratings
Review scores
Source	Rating
AllMusic	4/5 stars
The Rolling Stone Jazz Record Guide	4/5 stars

The AllMusic review by Brian Olewnick stated: "Barbecue Dog doesn't quite reach the explosive heights of its predecessor (Mandance), but is arguably the next best item in Jackson's discography. The band strikes a comfortable balance between the horns and the electric instruments, allowing each to surface when needed, and also complements the required barnburners with more contemplative pieces."

== Track listing ==
All compositions by Ronald Shannon Jackson except where noted.

1. "Barbeque Dog" - 4:21
2. "Trials of an Honest John" - 3:23
3. "Yugo Boy" - 3:09
4. "Say What You Will" (Vernon Reid) - 3:14
5. "Mystery at Dawn" - 4:38
6. "Gossip" - 5:48
7. "When Cherry Trees Bloom in Winter, You Can Smell Last Summer" - 5:28
8. "Harlem Opera" - 9:02

== Personnel ==
- Ronald Shannon Jackson – drums, flute, bass flute, Bertoia sound sculpture, voice
- Henry Scott – trumpet, flugelhorn, percussion, voice
- Zane Massey – tenor saxophone, alto saxophone, soprano saxophone, percussion, voice
- Vernon Reid – electric guitar, steel guitar, Roland guitar synthesizer, banjo, percussion, voice
- Melvin Gibbs – electric bass, percussion, voice
- Reverend Bruce Johnson – fretless electric bass, electric bass, piccolo bass, percussion, voice
