= Yale Strom =

American musician, filmmaker, writer, and photographer (born 1957)

- Born: Yale Strom; 1957 (age 68–69); Detroit, Michigan
- Genre: Klezmer
- Occupations: Violinist, composer, film director, writer, photographer, playwright
- Instrument: Violin
- Years active: 1981–present
- Spouse: Elizabeth Schwartz
- Website: yalestrom.com

Yale Strom is an American violinist, composer, filmmaker, writer, photographer and playwright. Strom is a pioneer among klezmer (musical tradition of the Ashkenazi Jews of Eastern Europe) revivalists in conducting extensive field research in Central and Eastern Europe and the Balkans among the Jewish and Romani communities since 1981. Initially, his work focused primarily on the use and performance of klezmer music between these two groups. Gradually, his focus increased to examining all aspects of their culture, from post-World War II to the present. He was among the first of the klezmer revivalists to identify the connection between klezmer and lautare (Roma/Gypsy musicians) and explore that connection in his scholarly and artistic works.

== Early life and education ==
Strom was born in Detroit in 1957, and moved to San Diego with his family at the age of 12. His parents were David Strom, a teacher and later a college professor, and Phyllis Newman Strom, a caterer. He is the eldest of eight siblings in a traditional Jewish family with socialist leanings, graduating from Crawford High School in 1976. Strom attended San Diego State University, where he was an All-American long-distance runner. He received dual bachelor's degrees in American studies and art, with a focus on furniture design and wood sculpture. He pursued further education at New York University from 1982 to 1984, earning a master’s degree in Yiddish studies while also working at YIVO, a Yiddish research institute.

== Career ==
=== Music ===
Yale Strom's klezmer field research helped form the base for the repertoires of his klezmer band Hot Pstromi based in NYC and San Diego. Since Strom's first band, Zmiros, began in 1981, he has been composing his own New Jewish music, which combines klezmer with Hasidic nigunim, Romani, jazz, classical, Balkan and Sephardic motifs. These compositions range from string quartets to a symphony, which premiered with the St. Louis Symphony Orchestra and his solo violin composition called "Bessarabia Suite" that was commissioned by Rachel Barton Pine. He composed original music for the Denver Center production of Tony Kushner's "The Dybbuk". He composed all the New Jewish music for the National Public Radio series "Fiddlers, Philosophers & Fools: Jewish Short Stories From the Old World to the New", hosted by Leonard Nimoy, as well as numerous film scores.

List of CD recordings: "Cholent With Huckleberry" (Rounder, 1985), "Eclectic Klezz" (Rounder/Global Village, 1987), "With A Little Horseradish on the Side" (Global Village, 1993 - featuring original Hot Pstromi lineup of Strom, Andy Statman, Mark Dresser, Ismail Butera and Seido Salifoski), "The Last Klezmer" (Global Village, 1994), "Carpati: 50 Miles, 50 Years" (Global Village, 1996), "Wandering Jew" (Global Village, 1997),"Tales Our Father Sang" (Global Village, 1998), "Garden of Yidn" (Naxos World, 2000) "Cafe Jew Zoo" (Naxos World, 2002), "Dveykes/Adhesion" (Global Village, 2005) "Absolutely Complete Klezmer" (Transcontinental Music, 2006), "Borsht with Bread, Brothers" (ARC Music UK, 2007), "Absolutely Klezmer, Vol. II" (Transcontinental, 2007), "The Devil's Brides: Music from The Witches of Lublin" (ARC Music UK, 2011, featuring narration by actress Miriam Margolyes). "City of the Future" (ARC Music), UK 2016 featuring Yiddish vocalists: Daniel Kahn, Jack "Yankl" Falk, Michael Alpert, Anthony Russell, Vira Lozinsky, Judy Bressler and Elizabeth Schwartz, "Yale Strom's Broken Consort: Shimmering Lights" (ARC Music), UK 2018 featuring: Sara Caswell, Amos Hoffman, David Wallace and Alex Greenbaum as guests with Hot Pstromi (Fred Benedetti, Jeff Pekarek, Elizabeth Schwartz and Yale Strom) and "The Wolf and The Lamb: Live at the Shakh" (ARC UK, 2022) featuring Yale Strom, Elizabeth Schwartz, Peter Stan, Aliakxandr Yasinski, Petr Dvorsky and Norbert Stachel.

Strom's “Aliyot" is a three-movement, 46-minute folk symphonic concerto, commissioned to honor the 50th anniversary of Israel’s founding and premiered by the St. Louis Symphony Orchestra in 1998. The piece reflects both the spiritual and physical meanings of the Hebrew word "aliyot" -- Jewish immigration to Israel and being called to the Torah -- through poems in Yiddish, Ladino, Yemeni-Arabic, and Hebrew.

Strom has performed with many well-known musicians including Andy Statman, Mark Dresser, Marty Ehrlich, Mark O’Connor, Alicia Svigals, Salman Ahmad, Samir Chatterjee, Muzsikas, Kálmán Balogh, Damian Draghici, Marta Sebestyen, Tanya Kalmanovitch, Sara Caswell, Peter Sprague, Gilbert Castellanos, Peter Stan, Norber Stachel, Alison Brown, Gilbert Castellanos, Adam Del Monte, Theo Bikel and myriad others. He became the first klezmer musician to perform for the United Nations General Assembly in 2010.

Strom has been hailed as "a commanding bandleader and composer" (Pulse! Magazine), "one of the best klezmer musicians in the country" (Houston Public News) and "an all-around musical visionary" (Seth Rogovoy). Dirty Linen sums it up most concisely: "Yale Strom is a Jewish roots trip unto himself". The New York Jewish Week writes:

"He's a gifted photographer and author, a talented documentary filmmaker and has his own klezmer band... Strom's multifaceted career is a wonder, and his work schedule is downright fiendish."

=== Books ===
Strom's research has also resulted in sixteen books (including "The Last Jews of Eastern Europe" and "Uncertain Roads: Searching for the Gypsies". He was the first photographer since Roman Vishniac to publish photographs of Jews in the Eastern Bloc countries. His "The Book of Klezmer: The History, The Music, The Folklore", a 400-page history with original photos and sheet music he gathered during his 60+ ethnographic trips to Central and Eastern Europe, was published by A Cappella Books in September 2002; this was soon followed by the publication of the world's first "Music Minus One" Instructional Guide to Klezmer (Universal Edition, Vienna Austria, April 2004). Strom then published an autobiographical book, written in collaboration with his wife, Elizabeth Schwartz, titled "A Wandering Feast: A Journey Through the Jewish Culture of Eastern Europe" (Jossey-Bass Publishers, 2005). Strom's book "The Absolute Complete Klezmer Songbook" (2006, Transcontinental Music) comes with a CD as well called Absolutely Klezmer Vol I and contains 313 known and rare klezmer melodies, many of which were collected by Strom during his years of field research. His first children's book "The Wedding That Saved a Town", illustrated by Jenya Prosmitsky, was published by Kar-Ben Publishing in 2008 and won the San Diego Library Association's Best Illustrated Children's book award in 2009. His biography of klezmer clarinetist David Tarras, "Dave Tarras: The King of Klezmer" (Or-Tav Publications, 2010) is the first full biography of Tarras, authorized by the Tarras family and includes 28 Tarras melodies, many of which have never before been published or recorded, as well as rare family archival photos and biographical details. Strom's second children's illustrated book is called "Shloyml Boyml and His Lucky Dreydl," illustrated by Emil Fuer-Singer. It is a bilingual book in English and Yiddish published by Olniansky Tekst Farlag (2021). Another in the Shloyml Boyml series "Sholyml Boyml and His Purim Adventure" came out spring 2023.

=== Film ===
Strom has directed ten award-winning documentary films (At the Crossroads, The Last Klezmer, Carpati: 50 Miles, 50 Years, L'Chayim, Comrade Stalin! and Klezmer on Fish Street) and has composed music for others. He was the first documentary filmmaker in history to be given his own run at Lincoln Center's prestigious Walter Reade Theatre, where The Last Klezmer broke box office records; this record was only exceeded by Carpati's run there. Both films went on to strong theatrical runs both in the U.S. and abroad, and were featured on major Top Ten Lists (The Last Klezmer on the N.Y. Post's for 1994, and Carpati on the San Diego Union Tribune's for 1997). The Last Klezmer was short-listed for an Academy Award. Klezmer on Fish Street won the 2003 Palm Beach International Film Festival's Special Jury Selection award. His documentary A Man From Munkacs: The Gypsy Klezmer was produced by Duna Television (Budapest, Hungary). Two edits exist, the producer's cut to be shown exclusively in Hungary, and the director's cut for other countries. In 2007, Strom curated an event in New York City, A Great Day on Eldridge Street, a photo shoot (by photographer Leo Sorel) of over 100 of the world's leading klezmer and Yiddish artists (based on the iconic photos "A Great Day in Harlem"), a parade through the Lower East Side and concerts. Strom's short film, A Great Day on Eldridge Street, documents these events. Strom in 2011 directed "A letter to Wedgewood: The Life of Gabriella Auspitz Harstein" which examines Jewish life in pre-war Mukacevo, Czechoslovakia, the rivalry between the Khasidim and Zionists and how Gabriella was saved by Lord Wedgewood from the Holocaust. In 2018 Strom directed "American Socialist: The Life and Times of Eugene Victor Debs" which examines the life of socialist and labor/union organizer Eugene Debs. It won "Best Feature Documentary" in the 2017 Workers Unite Film Festival in NYC. Strom's most recent documentary film is "Recordially Yours, Lou Curtiss" (2023) that is about record collector folk festival director Lou Curtiss who mentored such musicians as: Tom Waits, George Winston, Mojo Nixon, AJ Croce, Alison Brown.

=== Photo exhibitions ===
In the 1980s, Strom made several research trips to Eastern Europe, which became the foundation for much of his later work in photography, writing, and music. One of his earliest photo exhibitions was in 1986, with "A Tree Still Stands: The Last Jews of Eastern Europe," co-curated with Brian Blue and exhibited at the Spertus Museum in Chicago. His solo photo exhibit, "The Rom of Ridgewood", about Gypsy communities in Queens, New York, was mounted at the Queens Museum of Art in 2002; he has had numerous solo exhibits (depicting Jewish and Rom life) throughout the U.S. and Europe (complete exhibition list upon request). His solo exhibit of portraits of klezmer musicians (Jewish and Roma) in Bessarabia, "Klezmorim", was exhibited in Romania and Hungary. This same exhibition just recently was at the Jewish Community Center in Houston. His photos are part of many collections including Beth Hatefusoth, The Skirball Museum, The Jewish Museum of NYC, The Frankfurt Jewish Museum and the Museum of Photographic Arts. The Anne Frank Center in NYC created an exhibit of his photos called "Fragments: Jewish Life in Eastern Europe 1981-2016." The exhibit has been seen in Kalamazoo, Prague Jewish Museum and Brno Jewish Museum.

=== Plays ===
Strom's original stage play, "…from man… to beast… to crawling thing…", was given a fully staged workshop in June 2001 by the Streisand Festival (La Jolla, California). His play, "The Education of Hershl Greenshpan" (formerly, "Verdigris") was workshopped by the San Diego Rep, North Coast Rep as well as in New York City, Connecticut and Los Angeles. Strom was featured in the May 31, 2004 issue of Time for this play, and the scholarship behind it. In collaboration with wife and partner Elizabeth Schwartz and author Ellen Kushner, Strom co-wrote the audio drama, "The Witches of Lublin" (2011), starring Tovah Feldshuh, and featuring Simon Jones, Barbara Rosenblat and Neil Gaiman, among others. He also composed the original music for the recording. His second radio/audio drama is "Debs in Canton" (2021) directed by Sue Zizza and written by Elizabeth Schwartz and Yale Strom, with music by Strom. The drama stars: Phil Proctor, P. J. Ochlan, L. J. Ganser, Robert Fass, Anne Bobby, Doug Shapiro, Micah Gellert, Melinda Peterson and won Six Communicator Awards including best written drama.

=== Lectures and teaching ===
Strom has lectured extensively throughout the United States, Asia and Europe and taught at the Gallatin School of Individualized Study at NYU for 4 years, where he created the course "Artist-Ethnographer Expeditions". Strom was Artist-in-Residence in the Jewish Studies Program at San Diego State University, a position created for him from 2006 to 2020. Strom was the first klezmer violinist in history to be invited to instruct master classes at both the American String Teachers Association and the Mark O'Connor fiddle camp. Currently Strom teaches in the Music Dept. at SDSU and leads Jewish history, cultural and music tours with Ayelet Tours to Europe and North Africa.

== Personal life ==
Strom is married to Elizabeth Schwartz and has one daughter. He lives in San Diego.
