= Birds of Prey (Hank Roberts album) =

Studio album by Hank Roberts
- Released: 1990
- Recorded: January and February 1990
- Studio: Bauer Studios, Ludwigsburg
- Genre: Jazz
- Length: 44:04
- Label: JMT; JMT 834 437
- Producer: Stefan F. Winter

Hank Roberts chronology
Arcado (1989)	Birds of Prey (1990)	Behind the Myth (1989)

Birds of Prey is the second album led by cellist Hank Roberts which was recorded in 1990 and released on the JMT label.

== Reception ==
Professional ratings
Review scores
Source	Rating
AllMusic	4/5 stars
Los Angeles Times	3/5 stars

The AllMusic review by Michael G. Nastos says, "The music is progressive at times and too commercial at others. His best work lies ahead". The Los Angeles Times' Don Snowden noted "This CD could easily be a mutant mess if not for female vocalist D.K. Dyson, a shining beacon. Roberts doesn't hog the spotlight and his compositions ably negotiate juxtapositions which are often jarring but rarely forced".

== Track listing ==
All compositions by Hank Roberts

1. "Comin' Home" - 6:35
2. "Pretty Boy Tom" - 7:44
3. "Seven Generations" - 7:16
4. "Angels and Mud" - 4:27
5. "Scream" - 2:02
6. "Touch" - 8:15
7. "Hear Me" - 7:23

== Personnel ==
- Hank Roberts - cello, vocals
- Mark Lampariello - guitar, vocals
- Jerome Harris - bass, vocals
- Vinnie Johnson - drums, vocals
- D.K. Dyson - vocals
