= Shades of Bud Powell =

Studio album by Herb Robertson Brass Ensemble
- Released: 1988
- Recorded: January & March 1988; RPM Sound Studios, New York City
- Genre: Jazz
- Length: 44:40
- Label: JMT; JMT 834 420
- Producer: Stefan F. Winter

Herb Robertson chronology
X-Cerpts: Live at Willisau (1986)	Shades of Bud Powell (1988)	Certified (1991)

Shades of Bud Powell is the third solo album by trumpeter Herb Robertson. Featuring compositions by pianist Bud Powell arranged for a brass ensemble, the album was recorded in 1988 and released on the JMT label.

== Reception ==
The AllMusic review by Michael G. Nastos states, "Extraordinary date from this trumpeter and the All-Star Sextet on an all-Powell program, creatively arranged. Excellent beyond words".

Professional ratings
Review scores
Source	Rating
AllMusic	4.5/5 stars
The Penguin Guide to Jazz Recordings	4/4 stars

== Track listing ==
All compositions by Bud Powell except as indicated

1. "Un Poco Loco" - 5:37
2. "I'll Keep Loving You" - 6:54
3. "Hallucinations" - 9:41
4. "Glass Enclosure" - 5:29
5. "The Fruit" - 4:30
6. "Shades of Bud" (Herb Robertson) - 12:29

== Personnel ==
- Herb Robertson - trumpet, flugelhorn
- Brian Lynch - trumpet
- Vincent Chancey - French horn
- Robin Eubanks - trombone
- Bob Stewart - tuba
- Joey Baron - drums, percussion
