= News from the Front (album) =

Studio album by Marc Ducret
- Released: 1992
- Recorded: 23–26 June; 24–25 July 1991; Bauer Studios, Ludwigsburg, Germany
- Genre: Jazz
- Length: 48:57
- Label: JMT; JMT 849 148
- Producer: Stefan F. Winter

Marc Ducret chronology
Gris (1990)	News from the Front (1992)	(détail) (1997)

News from the Front is a 1992 jazz album by French guitarist Marc Ducret. It was recorded in 1991 and released on the JMT label.

== Reception ==
The AllMusic review by Thom Jurek states "This is provocative music to be sure, but it is refined and restrained, elegant even". The Penguin Guide to Jazz Recordings describes it as “strikingly original and probably his best record.”

Professional ratings
Review scores
Source	Rating
AllMusic	4/5 stars
The Penguin Guide to Jazz Recordings	4/4 stars

== Track listing ==
All compositions by Marc Ducret except as indicated

1. "Pour Agnes" - 3:44
2. "Can I Call You Wren?" - 6:30
3. "News from the Front" - 8:33
4. "Fanfare" - 9:39
5. "Wren Is Such a Strange Name" - 8:52
6. "Silver Rain" (Jean-Michel Pilc) - 3:20
7. "Golden Wren" - 8:19

== Personnel ==
- Marc Ducret - electric and acoustic 6 + 12 string guitars, fretless guitar
- Herb Robertson - trumpet, flugelhorn
- Yves Robert - trombone
- François Verly - percussion, drum machine
