= Certified (Herb Robertson album) =

Studio album by Herb Robertson
- Released: 1991
- Recorded: March 17–19, 1991; Sorcerer Sound, New York City
- Genre: Jazz
- Length: 73:09
- Label: JMT; JMT 849 150
- Producer: David Breskin

Herb Robertson chronology
Shades of Bud Powell (1988)	Certified (1991)	Falling in Flat Space (1996)

Certified is the fourth album by trumpeter Herb Robertson which was recorded and released in 1991 on the JMT label.

== Reception ==
The AllMusic review by Ron Wynn states, "Trumpeter Herb Robertson doesn't plug into any musical trend, whether it's hard bop, repertory, or fusion. He's among a handful of contemporary players who defy easy compartmentalization while striving for their own voice and sound".

Professional ratings
Review scores
Source	Rating
AllMusic	3/5 stars
The Penguin Guide to Jazz Recordings	3.5/4 stars

== Track listing ==
All compositions by Herb Robertson

1. "Friendly Fire" – 8:15
2. "Cosmic Child" – 12:24
3. "Don't Be Afraid We're Not Like the Others" – 14:40
4. "Eastawesta" – 9:53
5. "Seeking Seeds in the Blues Bazaar" – 17:38
6. "Ghostsongs" – 7:50
7. "The Condensed Version" – 3:03

== Personnel ==
- Herb Robertson – trumpet, flugelhorn, pocket trumpet, cornet, valve trombone, vocals
- David Taylor – bass trombone, voice
- Mack Goldsbury – tenor saxophone, soprano saxophone, clarinet, vocals, voice
- Ed Schuller – bass, tuning fork
- Phil Haynes – drums, percussion, bells, wind chimes, one-half plastic Peking Duck sack, crowbar, magic carpet, multitrack plastic tape cover, doorman's black umbrella
