= Diminutive Mysteries (Mostly Hemphill) =

Studio album by Tim Berne
- Released: 1993
- Recorded: September 1992
- Venue: Power Station, New York City
- Genre: Jazz
- Length: 65:37
- Label: JMT; JMT 514 003
- Producer: Stefan F. Winter

Tim Berne chronology
I Can't Put My Finger on It (1991)	Diminutive Mysteries (Mostly Hemphill) (1993)	Nice View (1994)

Diminutive Mysteries (Mostly Hemphill) is an album by saxophonist Tim Berne which was recorded in 1992 and released on the JMT label. The album is a tribute to Berne's mentor, Julius Hemphill. Alongside Berne's regular band is featured guest David Sanborn, in an outlier among his more mainstream R&B work.

== Reception ==
Professional ratings
Review scores
Source	Rating
AllMusic	4/5 stars
The Guardian	4/5 stars
The Penguin Guide to Jazz	4/4 stars
The Rolling Stone Jazz & Blues Album Guide	4/5 stars
Tom Hull – on the Web	B
The Virgin Encyclopedia of Jazz	4/5 stars

The AllMusic review by Scott Yanow states: "This is certainly the most unusual David Sanborn recording to date. Avant-gardist Tim Berne (heard here on alto and baritone) and the popular R&B star Sanborn (mostly leaving his trademark alto behind to play sopranino) share a great respect for altoist Julius Hemphill and the St. Louis free jazz movement... they perform seven often-emotional Hemphill pieces plus Berne's "The Maze." Sanborn is to be congratulated for successfully stretching himself although this is very much Berne's date".

The Guardian's John Fordham wrote: "The pieces are raw-boned and clamouring but rigorously structured and spine-tinglingly harmonised. Sometimes they sound like skewed bebop and sometimes like stealthily building improv, and Sanborn's soul sound... loses none of its famous wail."

John Howard of Perfect Sound Forever called the album "A stunning tour de force... one of the finest jazz albums ever made," and commented: "the album ranges in mood from the sublimely beautiful 'Writhing Love Lines' to... 'The Maze,' 21 minutes of tangling and untangling structure."

== Track listing ==
All compositions by Julius Hemphill except as indicated

1. "Sounds in the Fog" – 8:12
2. "Serial Abstractions" – 6:27
3. "Out, The Regular" – 5:54
4. "The Unknown" – 6:50
5. "Writhing Love Lines" – 7:20
6. "Rites" – 3:32
7. "The Maze (For Julius)" (Tim Berne) – 21:23
8. "Mystery to Me" – 6:30

== Personnel ==
- Tim Berne – alto saxophone, baritone saxophone
- David Sanborn – sopranino saxophone, alto saxophone
- Marc Ducret – electric guitar
- Hank Roberts – cello
- Joey Baron – drums
- Herb Robertson – trumpet, cornet, flugelhorn (track 7)
- Mark Dresser – bass (track 7)
