= Green (Hank Roberts album) =

Studio album by Hank Roberts
- Released: March 31, 2008
- Recorded: June 12–14, 2007
- Studio: FLUXX Tonstudio, Munich, Germany
- Genre: Jazz
- Length: 57:10
- Label: Winter & Winter; 910 141
- Producer: Stefan Winter

Hank Roberts chronology
| The Truth and Reconciliation Show (2002) | Green (2008) | Everything Is Alive (2011) |

Green is an album led by cellist Hank Roberts which was recorded in late 2007 and released on the Winter & Winter label.

== Reception ==
Professional ratings
Review scores
| Source | Rating |
|---|---|
| Allmusic | 3/5 stars |
| AllAboutJazz | 4.5/5 stars |

In his review for Allmusic, Alex Henderson said "This isn't angry, dense, harsh, abrasive, or claustrophobic music; Roberts values space, and the listener is given a lot of breathing room. When Roberts provides the occasional vocal and goes into "singing instrumentalist" mode, his appreciation of blues and folk becomes especially apparent. But even at his most rootsy, Roberts maintains his eccentricity and his left-of-center perspective, which is a perspective that yields generally noteworthy results on Green". In JazzTimes, Brent Burton observed "the musicianship sometimes outshines the songs themselves". On AllAboutJazz Mark F. Turner stated "Green is uniquely captivating, haunting yet warmly assuasive and, true to Roberts' form, not easily categorized. A wondrous journey for those who appreciate music of, literally, a different shade of green".

== Track listing ==
All compositions by Hank Roberts except as indicated

1. "Azul" - 9:19
2. "Bernie (Suite): Bernie Alap" - 4:02
3. "Bernie (Suite): Prayer" - 1:55
4. "Bernie (Suite): Bernie" - 1:04
5. "In the 60's" - 4:57
6. "Cola People" - 3:28
7. "Trees" - 3:45
8. "First" - 5:08
9. "Lenape (Suite): Lenape Alap" - 3:12
10. "Lenape (Suite): Nasfet" - 2:03
11. "Lenape (Suite): The Departing Hunter's Song/War Dance Song/Jersey Devil" (Traditional/Traditional/Roberts) - 8:09
12. "Long Walk" - 3:36
13. "Gentle" - 2:12
14. "Pictures" - 4:20

== Personnel ==
- Hank Roberts - cello, vocals, guitar
- Marc Ducret - electric and acoustic guitars
- Jim Black - drums, electronics
