= Transparency (album) =

Studio album by Herb Robertson Quintet
- Released: 1985
- Recorded: April 1985; Classic Sound, New York City
- Genre: Jazz
- Length: 45:16
- Label: JMT; JMT 850 002
- Producer: Jon Rosenberg & Herb Robertson

Herb Robertson chronology
Transparency (1985)	X-Cerpts: Live at Willisau (1987)

Transparency is the debut album by trumpeter Herb Robertson recorded in 1985 and released on the JMT label.

== Reception ==
The AllMusic review by Glenn Astarita states, "this is a significant outing by a trumpeter who has influenced many yet has evaded widespread recognition over the years. Recommended".

Professional ratings
Review scores
Source	Rating
AllMusic	4/5 stars
The Penguin Guide to Jazz Recordings	3.5/4 stars

== Track listing ==
All compositions by Herb Robertson

1. "Prolog" - 0:45
2. "Floatasia" - 8:24
3. "Flocculus" - 9:18
4. "Transparency" - 2:45
5. "They Don't Know About Me Yet" - 5:05
6. "Enigmatic Suite: Part 1 - Synergy, Part 2 - Overcast" - 6:15
7. "Part 3 - A Little Ditty" - 11:38
8. "Epilog" - 1:06

== Personnel ==
- Herb Robertson - cornet, trumpet, flugelhorn
- Tim Berne - alto saxophone
- Bill Frisell - guitar
- Lindsey Horner - bass
- Joey Baron - drums, percussion
