= Little Motor People =

Studio album by Hank Roberts
- Released: 1993
- Recorded: December 1992; Bauer Studios, Ludwigsburg
- Genre: Jazz
- Length: 61:08
- Label: JMT; JMT 514 005
- Producer: Stefan F. Winter

Hank Roberts chronology
For Three Strings and Orchestra (1992)	Little Motor People (1993)	22 Years from Now (1997)

Little Motor People is the third album led by cellist Hank Roberts which was recorded in late 1992 and released on the JMT label.

== Reception ==
Professional ratings
Review scores
Source	Rating
AllMusic	4/5 stars
LA Times	3/5 stars

AllMusic awarded the album 4 stars. The LA Times' Bill Kohlhaase noted "the highlight here is Roberts' five-part suite "Saturday/Sunday" with its acoustic sensibilities and smart interplay between Roberts, pianist Django Bates and percussionist Arto Tuncboyaciyan. Moving easily between jazz rhythms, tribal beats and classically influenced passages, the piece marks Roberts as a composer willing to overlook the usual boundaries between jazz and progressive music".

== Track listing ==
All compositions by Hank Roberts except as indicated

1. " Saturday/Sunday" - 18:58
2. "Over the Rainbow" (Harold Arlen Yip Harburg) - 4:30
3. "Only Minutes Left" - 4:47
4. "My Favourite Things" (Oscar Hammerstein II, Richard Rodgers) - 3:19
5. "Little Motor People" - 10:07
6. "Donna Lee" (Charlie Parker) - 3:04
7. "Black as a Sunny Day" (Django Bates, Hank Roberts) - 2:33
8. "Autumn Leaves" (Joseph Kosma, Johnny Mercer, Jacques Prévert) - 5:29
9. "30's Picnic" - 8:40

== Personnel ==
- Hank Roberts - cello, vocals, jazz-a-phone fiddle
- Django Bates - piano, synthesizer, tenor horn
- Arto Tunçboyacıyan - percussion, vocals
