= Richter 858 =

Studio album by Bill Frisell
- Released: January 11, 2005
- Recorded: July 20, 2002
- Studio: Studio Litho, Seattle, WA.
- Genre: Downtown music Improvised music
- Length: 47:10
- Label: Songlines
- Producer: David Breskin

Bill Frisell chronology
| Unspeakable (2004) | Richter 858 (2005) | East/West (2005) |

Richter 858 is a 2005 studio album by American jazz guitarist Bill Frisell consisting of improvised music inspired by the paintings of German artist Gerhard Richter.

== Background ==
The album features Frisell, Eyvind Kang, Jenny Scheinman and Hank Roberts. Richter 858 was originally released as part of a limited-edition volume of Gerhard Richter's paintings which also contained poetry and essays by Dave Hickey and Klaus Kertess inspired by the artist's work. The album was rereleased in 2005 on the Songlines label with a CD-ROM with MP3 music to accompany a slide show of the paintings, which are reproduced in an accompanying booklet.

== Reception ==
The Allmusic review by Sean Westergaard awarded the album 4 stars, stating, "This is a very interesting new sound for Bill Frisell, and apparently this band is developing more music together outside the scope of the original project. Recommended."

Professional ratings
Review scores
| Source | Rating |
|---|---|
| Allmusic | 4/5 stars |
| The Penguin Guide to Jazz Recordings | 3/4 stars |

== Track listing ==
All compositions by Bill Frisell.

1. "858-1" – 7:58
2. "858-2" – 3:15
3. "858-3" – 4:13
4. "858-4" – 9:00
5. "858-5" – 4:34
6. "858-6" – 6:40
7. "858-7" – 6:34
8. "858-8" – 4:56

== Personnel ==
- Bill Frisell – guitar, effects
- Eyvind Kang – viola
- Jenny Scheinman – violin
- Hank Roberts – cello
