= Marilyn Crispell, Mark Dresser, Gerry Hemingway Play Braxton =

Studio album by Marilyn Crispell, Mark Dresser, and Gerry Hemingway
- Released: 2012
- Recorded: April 19, 2011
- Studio: Tedesco Studios, Teaneck, New Jersey
- Genre: Free jazz
- Label: Tzadik; TZ 7640
- Producer: Gerry Hemingway

Marilyn Crispell, Mark Dresser, Gerry Hemingway Play Braxton is an album by pianist Marilyn Crispell, bassist Mark Dresser, and drummer Gerry Hemingway, recorded at Tedesco Studios in Teaneck, New Jersey. Although the CD booklet states that it was recorded in April 2010, it was actually recorded in April 2011, and was released in 2012 by Tzadik Records.

The album features compositions by Anthony Braxton. Crispell, Dresser, and Hemingway were members of Braxton's quartet during the 1980s and 1990s, and reunited in 2010 for a concert in honor of his 65th birthday. A discussion following the concert led to the recording of the album the following year.

== Reception ==
Professional ratings
Review scores
Source	Rating
AllMusic	4/5 stars

In a review for AllMusic, arwulf arwulf wrote: "The trio... achieves and sustains an empowered communion while celebrating Braxton's highly advanced formulae for collective improvisation... the archetypal changes wrought by a great and influential composer are expanded upon by artists whose close involvement made it possible to further the ideas and methodology of the masters."

Writing for The New York City Jazz Record, Stuart Broomer commented: "Crispell is magnificent, displaying the breadth of her playing... Dresser and Hemingway play at a level of thought and interaction most can only imagine and all three navigate this music with an intimacy that blurs compositional and improvisational methodologies into indivisible music. It's a masterpiece in itself, as well as an invitation to investigate all the original quartet's recordings."

Robert Bush, in a review for the San Diego Reader, stated: "To me, Braxton is an irrefutable genius and a singular visionary whose music will bear serious study for hundreds of years to come... This is a must for creative music fans."

== Track listing ==
All compositions by Anthony Braxton.

1. "Composition 116" – 5:55
2. "Composition 23C" – 4:15
3. "Composition 108C / 110 / 69Q" – 9:54
4. "Composition 69B [8.2]" – 6:48
5. "Composition 40N / 40B" – 12:57

== Personnel ==
- Marilyn Crispell – piano
- Mark Dresser – bass
- Gerry Hemingway – drums
