= Where in the World? (album) =

Studio album by Bill Frisell
- Released: 1991
- Recorded: October, 1990; January–February, 1991
- Studio: Dreamland (Hurley, New York); Power Station (New York City); Ironwood Studios (Seattle) (additional recording)
- Genre: Downtown music
- Length: 48:34
- Label: Elektra Nonesuch
- Producer: Wayne Horvitz

Bill Frisell chronology
Is That You? (1990)	Where in the World? (1991)	Have a Little Faith (1992)

Where in the World? is the third album by Bill Frisell to be released on the Elektra Nonesuch label. It was released in 1991 and features performances by Frisell, cellist Hank Roberts, bassist Kermit Driscoll and drummer Joey Baron.

== Reception ==
The AllMusic review by Daniel Gioffre stated, "One of the high points of '90s jazz guitar, Where in the World? is essential for fans of modern jazz".

Professional ratings
Review scores
Source	Rating
AllMusic	4.5/5 stars
The Penguin Guide to Jazz Recordings	2.5/4 stars

== Track listing ==
All compositions by Bill Frisell.

1. "Unsung Heroes" – 5:08
2. "Rob Roy" – 6:56
3. "Spell" – 6:59
4. "Child at Heart" – 5:57
5. "Beautiful E." – 3:22
6. "Again" – 6:38
7. "Smilin' Jones" – 2:34
8. "Where in the World?" – 5:30
9. "Worry Doll" – 4:58
10. "Let Me In" – 6:02

== Personnel ==
- Bill Frisell: guitars, ukulele
- Hank Roberts: cello, jazz-a-phone, fiddle
- Kermit Driscoll: bass
- Joey Baron: drums
