= Smash & Scatteration =

Studio album by Bill Frisell and Vernon Reid
- Released: 1985
- Recorded: December 1984
- Studio: Gramavision, NYC
- Genre: Avant-garde jazz, downtown music
- Length: 41:00
- Label: Minor Music
- Producer: David Breskin

Bill Frisell chronology
Rambler (1984)	Smash & Scatteration (1985)	Lookout for Hope (1987)

Vernon Reid chronology
Smash & Scatteration (1984)	Vivid (1988)

Smash & Scatteration is an album by guitarists Vernon Reid and Bill Frisell, released on Minor Music in 1985. It was rereleased on CD by Rykodisc.

== Reception ==
Professional ratings
Review scores
Source	Rating
AllMusic	3/5 stars
The Penguin Guide to Jazz	3/4 stars

The AllMusic review by Scott Yanow called it a "hectic and passionate set of duets" awarding the album 3 stars stating "Although this set has some quieter moments, the nine group originals are generally pretty intense and full of personality".

The authors of The Penguin Guide to Jazz Recordings wrote: "The joke here, of course, is that the quiet guy in the specs is the crazy one while Reid... is the one who holds the whole schtick together with his big but surprisingly accommodating chords."

Music critic Gene Santoro stated that Frisell and Reid "deconstruct guitar-duo music from the 1920s on," and noted that "the insightful, often hilarious results are grounded in knowledge and understanding."

Nick Deriso, writing for Something Else!, called the album "A memorably offbeat mashup," and commented: "There are hints of both guitarists' future successes in Americana and metal, but... neither Frisell nor Reid stick to their scripted roles — something that might be a challenge to fans of either's later work... Through the sheer force of their combined energy and delight, however, much of it works, anyway."

== Track listing ==
All compositions by Bill Frisell except where noted

1. "Landscapes in Alternative History" (Vernon Reid) – 4:27
2. "Size 10½ Sneaks" – 3:10
3. "Amarillo, Barbados" – 2:49
4. "Last Nights of Paris" (Reid) – 3:04
5. "Burden of Dreams" (Reid) – 6:35
6. "Dark Skin" (Reid) – 5:27
7. "Fr, Fr, Frisell" – 4:10
8. "Small Hands" – 4:12
9. "Black Light" – 7:06

== Personnel ==
- Bill Frisell – acoustic guitar, electric guitar, prepared guitar, guitar synthesizer, synthesizer, electronic drums, effects
- Vernon Reid – electric guitar guitar synthesizer, banjo, synthesizer, electronic drums
