= Santuerio =

Live album by Marilyn Crispell
- Released: 1993
- Recorded: May 5, 1993
- Venue: Roulette, New York City
- Genre: Free Jazz
- Label: Leo Records; CD LR 191
- Producer: Leo Feigin, Marilyn Crispell

Santuerio is a live album by pianist Marilyn Crispell. It was recorded at Roulette in New York City in May 1993, and was released later that year by Leo Records. On the album, Crispell is joined by violinist Mark Feldman, cellist Hank Roberts, and drummer Gerry Hemingway.

== Reception ==
Professional ratings
Review scores
Source	Rating
AllMusic	4/5 stars
The Penguin Guide to Jazz	4/4 stars
Tom Hull – on the Web	B
The Virgin Encyclopedia of Jazz	4/5 stars

In a review for AllMusic, Brian Olewnick wrote that on Santuerio, the music, "here essentially an eight-part suite, took on a more elegiac, overtly spiritual tone. The pieces are draped around the loosest of thematic materials, the musicians instead using the wisps of ideas to gently launch into introspective investigations, occasionally coalescing into brief, more frenzied bouts, but generally remaining in a pensive state... Overall, it's an impressive achievement, showing a new side of this fascinating musician."

The authors of the Penguin Guide to Jazz Recordings awarded the album 4 stars, and stated: "Santuerio marks Crispell's full emergence as a composer... much of the music is improvised, but it is linked by elemental structures... and a visionary spirit... Santuerio tackles huge themes, but there is nothing grandiose or overblown about it. The music is beautifully controlled and specific. Crispell's finest hour."

== Track listing ==
All compositions by Marilyn Crispell.

1. "Entrances of Light" – 6:10
2. "Air / Fire" – 10:32
3. "Water" – 2:57
4. "Burning Air / Wood" – 5:01
5. "Santuerio" – 13:24
6. "Repercussions of Light" – 9:32
7. "Red Shift" – 13:44
8. "Repercussions of Air I / Repercussions of Air II" – 7:25

== Personnel ==
- Marilyn Crispell – piano
- Mark Feldman – violin
- Hank Roberts – cello
- Gerry Hemingway – drums
