= Table of Changes =

Live album by Marilyn Crispell and Gerry Hemingway
- Released: 2015
- Recorded: May 2013
- Venue: Ulrichsberg, Austria; Arles, France; Amsterdam, Netherlands; Le Mans, France
- Genre: Free jazz
- Label: Intakt; CD 246

Table of Changes is a live album by pianist Marilyn Crispell and drummer Gerry Hemingway. It was recorded in Austria, France, and the Netherlands in May 2013, and was released in 2015 by Intakt Records. The duo have an extensive history dating back to their membership in the Anthony Braxton quartet during the 1980s and 1990s.

== Reception ==
Professional ratings
Review scores
Source	Rating
The Guardian	4/5 stars
All About Jazz #1	4.5/5 stars
All About Jazz #2	4/5 stars
The Absolute Sound	4/5 stars

In a review for The Guardian, John Fordham wrote: "Crispell's strength, decisiveness and energy often surface in the turbulent chordwork that rolls and rings against Hemingway's needling cymbal sounds and pummelling drums, but she's as likely to float glistening treble tones over the drummer's vibraphone glow or the pings of finger-cymbals... It's an uncannily attuned partnership."

John Sharpe, in an article for All About Jazz, called the album "an outstanding recital," and stated: "Contrapuntal interplay proliferates, not only between the two protagonists, which is a given in the stripped back format of a duet, but also as an integral ingredients of each individual's expression on what are multiple voiced instruments... the album celebrates the near telepathic communication between these two masters." In a separate AAJ review, Glenn Astarita wrote that the musicians' "nonpareil kinship is an underlying factor via spontaneous improvisation, structure and stimulating mechanics, especially when they regenerate themes with undulating flows, iridescent hues and capricious dialogues."

Writing for Jazz Times, Mike Shanley stated that the album "sounds nothing less than joyful," and commented: "'Ev'rytime We Say Goodbye,' beginning with just a series of sustained piano chords, slowly reveals itself. Hemingway adds only the sparest of percussive accompaniment, putting the song in a new light and also making a statement about how dear friends feel at the end of two weeks of deep onstage discussion. It's bittersweet, not maudlin, plumbing emotional depths even in its simplicity."

Jason Bivins, in a review for Point of Departure, referred to the album as "a detailed, absorbing program of music... a glorious hour from two of my favorite musicians, filled with lovely and unexpected moments."

== Track listing ==
"Ev'ry Time We Say Goodbye" by Cole Porter. Remaining compositions by Marilyn Crispell and Gerry Hemingway.

1. "Spirings" – 6:11
2. "Waterwisp" – 5:23
3. "Roofless" – 8:20
4. "Night Passing" – 12:08
5. "Windy City" – 13:51
6. "Assembly" – 5:49
7. "Ev'ry Time We Say Goodbye" – 7:13
8. "Table Of Changes" – 6:53
- Tracks 1, 2, 3, and 6 recorded on May 5, 2013, at 2013 Ulrichsberg Kaleidophon in Austria. Track 4 recorded on May 14, 2013, at La Chapelle du Mejan at the 19th Edition of Jazz in Arles in France. Tracks 5 and 7 recorded on May 16, 2013, at the Bimhuis, Amsterdam, Netherlands. Track 8 recorded on May 12, 2013, at the Europa Jazz Festival in Le Mans, France.

== Personnel ==
- Marilyn Crispell – piano
- Gerry Hemingway – drums, percussion, vibraphone
