= Mandance =

Man Dance

Studio album by Ronald Shannon Jackson and the Decoding Society
- Released: 1982
- Recorded: June 1982
- Studio: Electric Lady, NYC
- Genre: Free jazz
- Length: 41:06
- Label: Antilles; AN 1008
- Producer: David Breskin, Ronald Shannon Jackson

Ronald Shannon Jackson chronology
Nasty (1981)	Man Dance (1982)	Barbeque Dog (1983)

Man Dance is an album by Ronald Shannon Jackson and the Decoding Society, recorded in 1982 for the Antilles label. It was produced with money Jackson made on a European tour, and taped the day after the band's return. Three tracks were done seven months earlier, with a different trumpet and an additional sax.

== Reception ==
Professional ratings
Review scores
Source	Rating
AllMusic	4.5/5 stars
Robert Christgau	A−
The Encyclopedia of Popular Music	3/5 stars
The Rolling Stone Jazz Record Guide	4/5 stars

The AllMusic review by Scott Yanow stated: "The ensemble-oriented 'free funk' music of drummer Ronald Shannon Jackson's Decoding Society never can be accused of being overly mellow or lacking in excitement ... The frenetic and intense ensembles (essentially everyone solos at once) would not be classified as relaxing background music." NPR thought that "the spiky Afro-pop guitar, two grumbling electric basses and melodies played in several keys at once are all out of Ornette Coleman's band Prime Time. But the Decoding Society had a lazier lope and wasn't quite so eager to fill all the available space."

== Track listing ==
All compositions by Ronald Shannon Jackson.

1. "Man Dance" - 4:32
2. "Iola" - 5:24
3. "Spanking" - 3:07
4. "Catman" - 6:42
5. "The Art of Levitation" - 1:24
6. "Belly Button" - 4:45
7. "Giraffe" - 3:09
8. "When Souls Speak" - 5:48
9. "Alice in the Congo" - 6:09

== Personnel ==
- Ronald Shannon Jackson – drums
- David Gordon (tracks 1, 2 & 8), Henry Scott (tracks 3–7 & 9) – trumpet, flugelhorn
- Zane Massey – tenor saxophone, alto saxophone, soprano saxophone
- Lee Rozie – tenor saxophone, soprano saxophone (tracks 1, 2 & 8)
- Vernon Reid – electric guitar, steel guitar, Roland guitar synthesizer, banjo
- Melvin Gibbs – electric bass
- Reverend Bruce Johnson – fretless electric bass, electric bass
