= Nice View (album) =

Studio album by Tim Berne's Caos Totale
- Released: 1994
- Recorded: August 1993
- Studios: Power Station, New York City
- Genre: Jazz
- Length: 76:50
- Labels: JMT; JMT 824 442
- Producers: Stefan F. Winter & Tim Berne

Tim Berne chronology
Diminutive Mysteries (Mostly Hemphill) (1993)	Nice View (1994)	Lowlife: The Paris Concert (1995)

Nice View is an album by saxophonist Tim Berne's Caos Totale which was recorded in 1993 and released on the JMT label.

== Reception ==
The AllMusic review by Brian Olewnick states "In many ways, Berne seems to pick up on groundwork laid by his teacher, the great composer/saxophonist Julius Hemphill, and takes things to the next stage, walking the fine line between deep composition and inspired improvisation. One of Berne's best efforts".

Professional ratings
Review scores
Source	Rating
AllMusic	4/5 stars

== Track listing ==
All compositions by Tim Berne

1. "It Could Have Been a Lot Worse" - 21:15
2. "The Third Rail" - 17:32
3. "Impacted Wisdom" - 38:03

== Personnel ==
- Tim Berne - alto saxophone
- Herb Robertson - trumpet
- Steve Swell - trombone
- Django Bates - peck horn, keyboards, piano, confusion
- Marc Ducret - guitars, shades
- Mark Dresser - contrabass
- Bobby Previte - drums
