= I Can't Put My Finger on It =

Studio album by Miniature
- Released: 1991
- Recorded: January 1991
- Studio: Sorcerer Sound, New York City
- Genre: Jazz
- Length: 73:59
- Label: JMT; JMT 849 147
- Producer: David Breskin, Ron Saint Germain

Tim Berne chronology
Pace Yourself (1990)	I Can't Put My Finger on It (1991)	Diminutive Mysteries (Mostly Hemphill) (1992)

Hank Roberts chronology
Behind the Myth (1990)	I Can't Put My Finger on It (1991)	For Three Strings and Orchestra (1992)

I Can't Put My Finger on It is the second and last album by Miniature, drummer Joey Baron, saxophonist Tim Berne and cellist Hank Roberts, recorded in 1991 and released on the JMT label.

== Reception ==
The AllMusic review by Stephen Cook stated: "The result here is a corralled mix of bop, free jazz, soundtrack ambience, and funk, all wrapped in Berne's cerebrally swinging sound. And while not a substitute for one of Berne's or Baron's solo outings of the '90s, I Can't Put My Finger on It will still please fans of the New York downtown jazz sound." The Penguin Guide to Jazz Recordings praised the album, writing that it had an edge over their debut.

Professional ratings
Review scores
Source	Rating
AllMusic	3/5 stars
The Encyclopedia of Popular Music	3/5 stars
The Penguin Guide to Jazz Recordings	3/4 stars

== Track listing ==
All compositions by Tim Berne except as indicated

1. "Zilla" - 2:34
2. "Jersey Devil" (Hank Roberts) - 5:32
3. "P.G. Suggested" (Joey Baron) - 6:30
4. "Combat" - 13:30
5. "Aspetta" (Baron) - 7:16
6. "Lowball" - 3:45
7. "Luna" - 9:17
8. "Bullfrog Breath" (Roberts) - 10:19
9. "Who's Vacant?" (Baron) - 5:27
10. "Weasels in the Bush" (Roberts) - 9:32
11. "Dink*" (Baron) - 1:19

== Personnel ==
- Tim Berne - alto saxophone, baritone saxophone
- Hank Roberts - cello, jazz-a-phone fiddle, voice
- Joey Baron - drums, membranophone, shakatronics
