= Tim Berne's Fractured Fairy Tales =

Studio album by Tim Berne
- Released: 1989
- Recorded: June 1989
- Studio: Sound On Sound Recording Studio, New York City
- Genre: Avant-garde jazz
- Length: 55:05
- Label: JMT; JMT 834 431
- Producer: Stefan F. Winter

Tim Berne chronology
Miniature (1988)	Tim Berne's Fractured Fairy Tales (1989)	Pace Yourself (1991)

Tim Berne's Fractured Fairy Tales is an album by saxophonist Tim Berne which was recorded in 1989 and released on the JMT label.

== Reception ==
The AllMusic review by Scott Yanow said "Tim Berne's music on his CD sometimes looks a little toward Anthony Braxton's free bop lines but also incorporates some electronics, unusual instrumental textures and some just plain weird sounds" and called it an "esoteric yet listenable set".

Professional ratings
Review scores
Source	Rating
AllMusic	4/5 stars
The Penguin Guide to Jazz Recordings	3/4 stars

== Track listing ==
All compositions by Tim Berne except as indicated

1. "Now Then" (Tim Berne, Mark Dresser) - 3:13
2. "SEP" - 8:05
3. "Hong Kong Sad Song / More Coffee" - 11:36
4. "Evolution of a Pearl" - 19:34
5. "Lightnin' Bug Bouté" - 0:38
6. "The Telex Blues" - 11:37

== Personnel ==
- Tim Berne - alto saxophone, voice
- Herb Robertson - trumpet, cornet, laryngeal crowbar
- Mark Feldman - violin, baritone violin
- Hank Roberts - cello, electric cello, vocals
- Mark Dresser - bass, giffus, bungy
- Joey Baron - drums, CZ-101, shacktronics
