= Hank Roberts =

American jazz cellist and vocalist

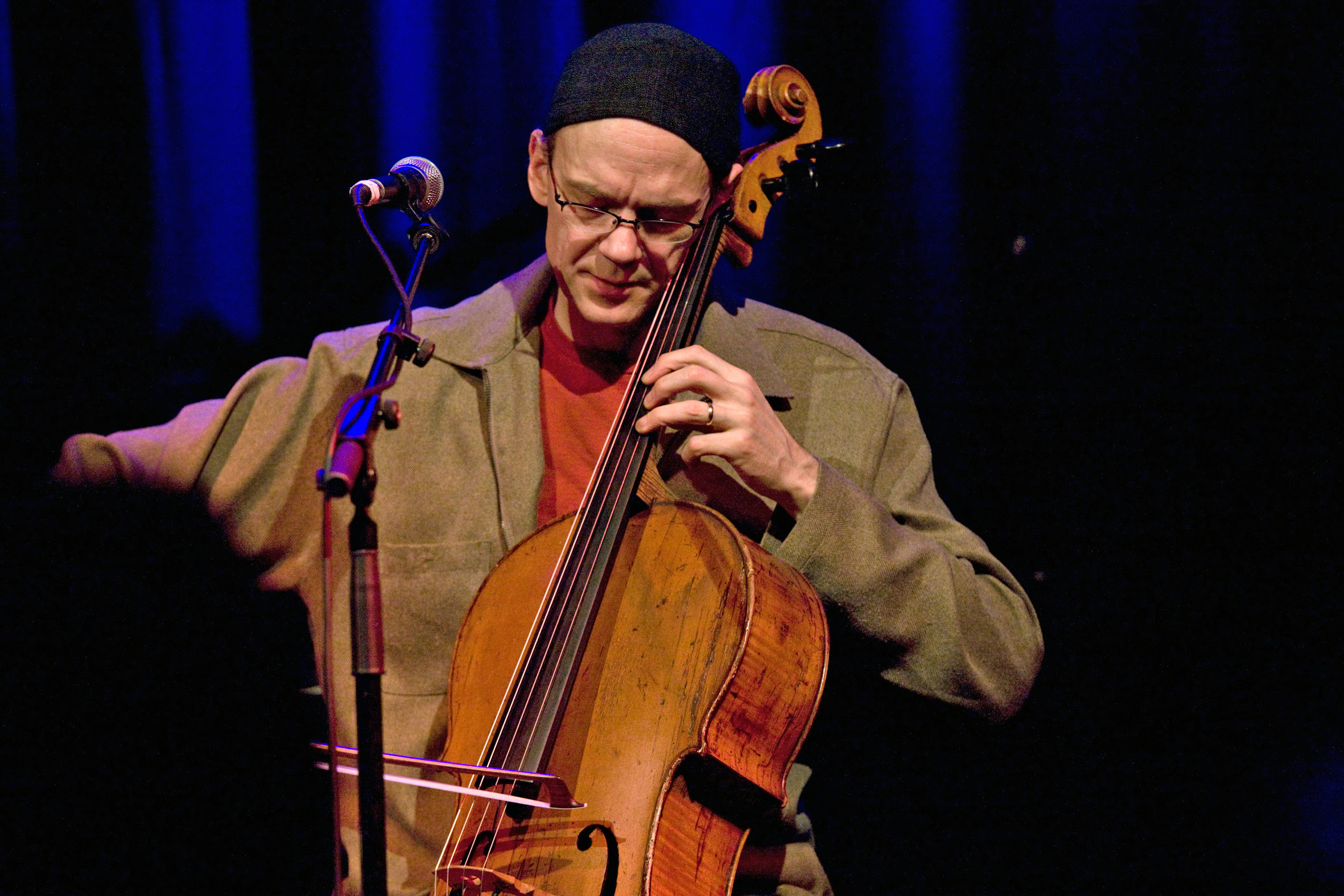
- Hank Roberts at Jazzhaus Stadtgarten, Köln/Cologne (Germany), March 2008

Background information
- Born: March 24, 1954 (age 71); Terre Haute, Indiana, U.S.
- Origin: New York City
- Genres: Jazz
- Occupation: Musician
- Instrument(s): Cello, vocals
- Years active: 1980s–present
- Website: hankrobertsmusic.com

Hank Roberts (born March 24, 1954, Terre Haute, Indiana) is an American jazz cellist and vocalist. He plays the electric cello, and his style is a mixture of rock, jazz, avant-garde, folk, and classical influences. He emerged with the downtown New York City jazz scene of the 1980s and is associated with its post-modern tendencies.

== Background ==
In the early 1980s, Roberts made a number of recordings for the defunct JMT label, was a featured member of the Bill Frisell Quartet, and was an important voice in many groups of saxophonist Tim Berne. Roberts also recorded three discs with the Arcado String Trio, an improvisational chamber group featuring Mark Feldman, violin, and Mark Dresser, double bass.

In the early 1990s, Roberts left Frisell's group and stopped touring widely. He continued to release recordings, if sporadically, including with the progressive folk group Ti Ti Chickapea. In 2008, he was again touring and performing regularly, releasing Green (with Jim Black and Marc Ducret) on Winter & Winter, Stefan F. Winters subsequent label to JMT. In December 2011, Winter & Winter released Roberts' Everything Is Alive, as well as re-releasing his entire JMT catalogue.

== Selected discography ==
=== As leader ===
- Black Pastels (JMT, 1987)
- Birds of Prey (JMT, 1990)
- Little Motor People (JMT, 1993)
- 22 Years from Now (Level Green, 1997)
- I'll Always Remember (Level Green, 1998)
- Cause and Reflect (Level Green, 1998) with Tim Berne
- The Truth and Reconciliation Show (I Town, 2002)
- Green (Winter & Winter, 2008) with Marc Ducret and Jim Black
- Everything Is Alive (Winter & Winter, 2011) with Bill Frisell, Jerome Harris and Kenny Wollesen
- Congeries of Ethereal Phenomena (Newvelle, 2019)
- Science of Love (Sunnyside, 2021) with Hank Roberts Sextet

With Arcado String Trio

- Arcado (JMT, 1989)
- Behind the Myth (JMT, 1990)
- For Three Strings and Orchestra (JMT, 1992)

With Miniature (Joey Baron, Tim Berne, Roberts)

- Miniature (JMT, 1989)
- I Can't Put My Finger on It (JMT, 1992)

With Buffalo Collision

- Duck (Screwgun, 2008)

With Tim Berne and Aurora Nealand

- Oceans And (Intakt, 2023)

=== As sideman ===
With Tim Berne

- Fulton Street Maul (CBS, 1986)
- Sanctified Dreams (Columbia, 1988)
- Tim Berne's Fractured Fairy Tales (JMT, 1989)
- Diminutive Mysteries (Mostly Hemphill) (JMT, 1993)

With Bill Frisell

- Lookout for Hope (ECM, 1987)
- Before We Were Born (Nonesuch, 1989)
- Where in the World (Nonesuch, 1991)
- Unspeakable (Nonesuch, 2004)
- Richter 858 (Songlines, 2005)
- History, Mystery (Nonesuch, 2008)
- Disfarmer (Nonesuch, 2009)
- Sign of Life: Music for 858 Quartet (Savoy, 2011)
- Big Sur (Okeh, 2013)
- Harmony (Blue Note records, 2019)

With Alex Cline

- The Lamp and the Star (ECM, 1987)

With Marilyn Crispell

- Santuerio (1993)

With Ti Ti Chickapea

- Change of Worlds (2000)
- Firestick (2002)

With Edmar Castañeda

- Cuarto de Colores (2006)

With Donald Rubinstein

- Martin (Motion Picture Soundtrack) (Varèse Sarabande, 1978)
- When She Kisses the Ship on His Arm (Bare Bones, 2009)
