= Mark Dresser =

American double bass player and composer (born 1952)

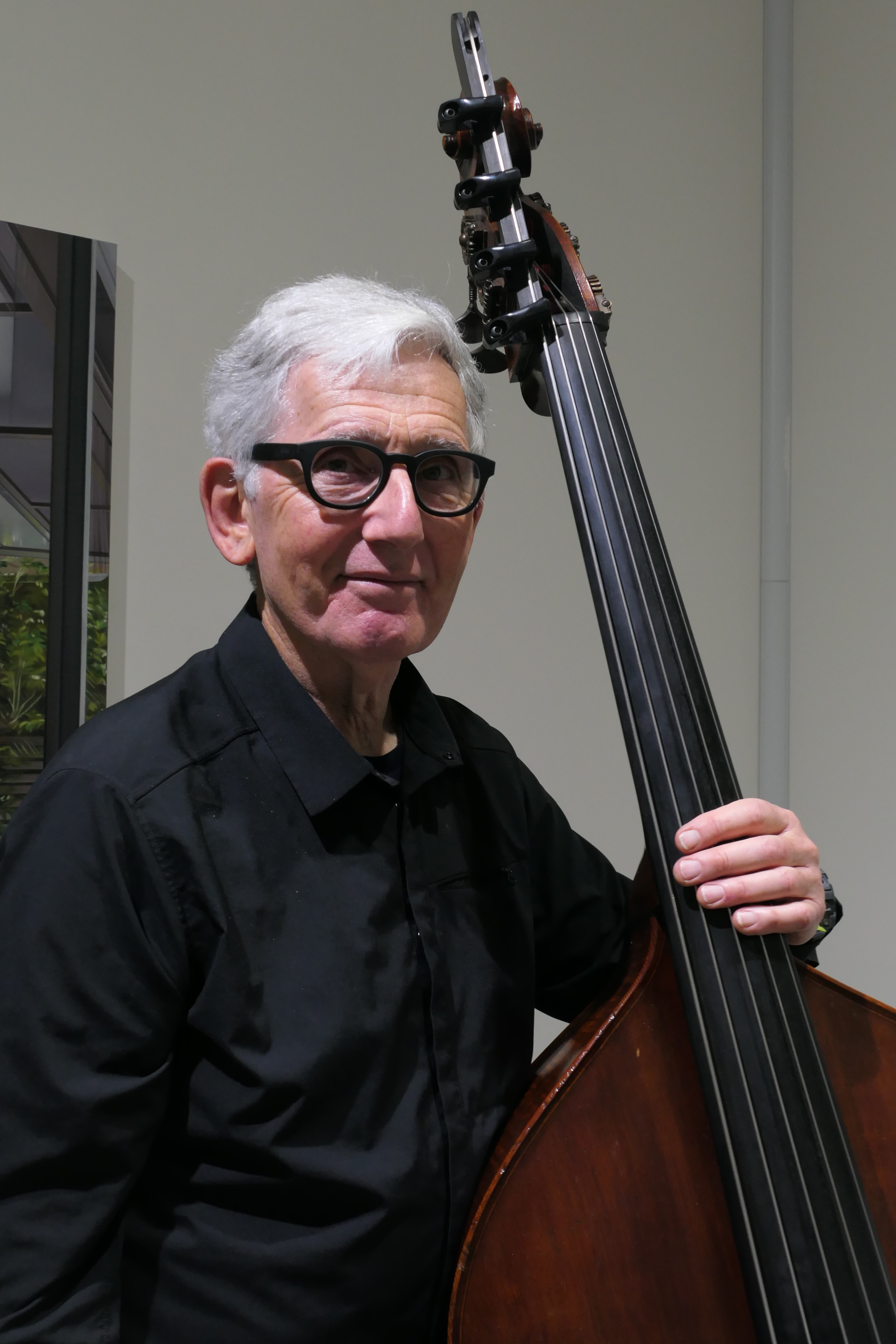

Background information
- Born: September 26, 1952 (age 74); Los Angeles, California, U.S.
- Genres: Jazz rock, chamber rock
- Occupations: Musician, composer
- Instrument: Double bass
- Years active: 1970s–present
- Labels: Soul Note, Knitting Factory, Tzadik, Cryptogramophone, Enja, Clean Feed, Pi, CIMP
- Website: mark-dresser.com

Mark Dresser (born September 26, 1952) is an American double bass player and composer.

== Career ==
Dresser was born in Los Angeles, California, United States. In the 1970s, he was a member of Black Music Infinity led by Stanley Crouch and performed with the San Diego Symphony. During the next decade he moved to New York City and became a member of the Anthony Braxton quartet with Marilyn Crispell and Gerry Hemingway. He composed for the Arcado String Trio and Tambastics and for the film, The Cabinet of Dr. Caligari.

== Discography ==
=== As leader ===
- Arcado with Arcado String Trio (JMT, 1989)
- Behind the Myth with Arcado String Trio (JMT, 1990)
- For Three Strings and Orchestra with Arcado String Trio (JMT, 1992)
- The Cabinet of Dr. Caligari (Knitting Factory, 1994)
- Invocation (Knitting Factory, 1995)
- Force Green (Soul Note, 1995)
- Live in Europe with Arcado String Trio (Avant, 1996)
- Banquet (Tzadik, 1997)
- Eye'll Be Seeing You (Knitting Factory, 1998)
- C/D/E with Andrew Cyrille (Pao, 2000)
- Marinade (Tzadik, 2000)
- Later with Fred Frith (Victo, 2000)
- The Marks Brothers with Mark Helias (W.E.R.F., 2000)
- Sonomondo with Frances-Marie Uitti (Cryptogramophone, 2000)
- Duologues with Denman Maroney (Victo, 2001)
- Reunion Live... at the Guelph Festival with Gerry Hemingway (Intrepid Ear, 2001)
- Aquifer (Cryptogramophone, 2002)
- Nine Songs Together with Ray Anderson (CIMP, 2003)
- Tone Time with Susie Ibarra (Wobbly Rail, 2003)
- Time Changes with Denman Maroney (Cryptogramophone, 2005)
- Unveil (Clean Feed, 2005)
- Airwalkers with Roswell Rudd (Clean Feed, 2006)
- House of Mirrors with Ed Harkins (Clean Feed, 2008)
- Duetto with Diane Moser (CIMP, 2008)
- Starmelodics with Kauffman/Eisenstadt (Nuscope, 2009)
- Live in Concert with Denman Maroney (Kadima Collective, 2009)
- Live at Lotus with Vinny Golia (Kadima Collective, 2010)
- Soul to Soul with Remi Alvarez (Intolerancia, 2010)
- Guts (Kadima Collective, 2010)
- Synastry with Jen Shyu (Pi, 2011)
- Nourishments (Clean Feed, 2013)
- Code Re(a)d with Gerry Hemingway (Hopscotch, 2014)
- Sedimental You (Clean Feed, 2016)
- Modicana (NoBusiness, 2017)
- Ain't Nothing But a Cyber Coup & You (Clean Feed, 2019)

=== As sideman ===
With Ray Anderson

- Harrisburg Half Life (Moers Music, 1980)
- It Just So Happens (Enja, 1987)
- Blues Bred in the Bone (Enja, 1988)
- What Because (Gramavision, 1990)

With Tim Berne

- Sanctified Dreams (Columbia 1987)
- Tim Berne's Fractured Fairy Tales (JMT, 1989)
- Pace Yourself (JMT, 1991)
- Diminutive Mysteries (Mostly Hemphill) (JMT, 1993)
- Nice View (JMT, 1994)

With Jane Ira Bloom

- The Red Quartets (Arabesque, 1999)
- Sometimes the Magic (Arabesque, 2001)
- Chasing Paint (Arabesque, 2003)
- Like Silver, Like Song (ArtistShare, 2005)

With Bobby Bradford

- Live in L.A. (Clean Feed, 2011)
- Live at the Open Gate (NoBusiness, 2016)

With Anthony Braxton

- The Coventry Concert (West Wind, 1987)
- Five Compositions (Quartet) 1986 (Black Saint, 1986)
- If My Memory Serves Me Right (West Wind, 1987)
- Quartet (London) 1985 (Leo, 1988)
- Quartet (Birmingham) 1985 (Leo, 1991)
- Willisau (Quartet) 1991 (hat ART, 1992)
- Quartet (Coventry) 1985 (Leo, 1993)
- (Victoriaville) 1992 (Victo, 1993)
- Twelve Compositions (Music & Arts, 1994)
- Quartet (Santa Cruz) 1993 (hat ART, 1997)
- Quartet (New York) 1993 Set 1 (Braxton Bootleg, 2011)
- Quartet (New York) 1993 Set 2 (Braxton Bootleg, 2011)
- Quartet (London) 1991 04.02 Set 1 (Braxton Bootleg, 2013)
- Quartet (London) 1991 04.02 Set 2 (Braxton Bootleg, 2013)
- Quartet (London) 1991 04.03 Set 1 (Braxton Bootleg, 2013)
- Quartet (London) 1991 04.03 Set 2 (Braxton Bootleg, 2013)
- Quartet (Santa Cruz) 1993 1st Set (hatOLOGY, 2015)
- Quartet (Santa Cruz) 1993 2nd Set (hatOLOGY, 2015)
- Quartet (Willisau) 1991 Studio (hatOLOGY, 2018)

With Dave Douglas

- Parallel Worlds (Soul Note, 1993)
- Sanctuary (Avant, 1997)

With Satoko Fujii

- Looking Out of the Window (Ninety-One, 1997)
- Kitsune-bi (Tzadik, 1999)
- Toward To West (Enja, 2000)
- Junction (EWE, 2001)
- Bell the Cat! (Tokuma, 2002)
- Illusion Suite (Libra, 2004)
- Live in Japan 2004 (Natsat Music, 2005)
- When We Were There (PJL, 2006)
- Trace a River (Libra, 2008)

With Gerry Hemingway

- Demon Chaser (hat ART, 1993)
- Down to the Wire (hat ART, 1993)
- The Marmalade King (hat ART, 1995)
- Slamadam (Random Acoustics, 1995)
- Perfect World (Random Acoustics, 1996)
- Johnny's Corner Song (Auricle, 1998)
- Chamber Works (Tzadik, 1999)
- Waltzes, Two-Steps & Other Matters of the Heart (GM, 1999)
- Devils Paradise (Clean Feed, 2003)

With Bob Ostertag

- Say No More (RecRec Music, 1993)
- Say No More in Person (Transit, 1993)
- Verbatim (Rastascan, 1996)
- Verbatim, Flesh and Blood (Rastascan, 1998)

With John Zorn

- Spy vs Spy: The Music of Ornette Coleman (Nonesuch, 1988)
- Kristallnacht (99 Records, 1993)
- Bar Kokhba (Tzadik, 1996)
- Cobra: John Zorn's Game Pieces Volume 2 (Tzadik, 2002)

With others

- Laurie Anderson, Strange Angels (Warner Bros. 1989)
- Gregg Bendian, Counterparts (CIMP, 1996)
- Gregg Bendian, Gregg Bendian's Interzone (Eremite, 1996)
- Salvatore Bonafede, For the Time Being (CAM Jazz, 2005)
- Eugene Chadbourne, Pain Pen (Avant, 2000)
- Alex Cline, For People in Sorrow (Cryptogramophone, 2013)
- Nels Cline, The Inkling (Cryptogramophone, 2000)
- Tom Cora, It's a Brand New Day (Knitting Factory, 2000)
- Marilyn Crispell, The Kitchen Concert (Leo, 1991)
- Marilyn Crispell, Mark Dresser, Gerry Hemingway, Play Braxton (Tzadik, 2012)
- Stanton Davis, Manhattan Melody (Enja, 1988)
- Robert Dick, Jazz Standards On Mars (Enja, 1997)
- Paul Dresher & Ned Rothenberg, Opposites Attract (New World/CounterCurrents 1991)
- Marty Ehrlich, The Long View (Enja, 2002)
- Amir ElSaffar, Radif Suite (Pi, 2010)
- Ellery Eskelin, Vanishing Point (hatOLOGY, 2001)
- David Garland, Togetherness: Control Songs Vol. 2 (Ergodic, 1999)
- Osvaldo Golijov Yiddishbbuk (EMI, 2002)
- Osvaldo Golijov, Upshaw the Andalucian Dogs Ayre & Folk Songs (Deutsche Grammophon, 2005)
- Sebastian Gramss, Thinking Of (Wergo, 2014)
- Burton Greene, Peace Beyond Conflict (CIMP, 2002)
- Francois Houle, In the Vernacular (Songlines, 1998)
- Jason Hwang, Unfolding Stone (Sound Aspects, 1990)
- Steve Lehman, Interface (Clean Feed, 2004)
- Steuart Liebig, Pomegranate (Cryptogramophone, 2001)
- Frank London, The Debt (Tzadik, 1997)
- Russ Lossing, Metal Rat (Clean Feed, 2006)
- Joe Lovano, Flights of Fancy: Trio Fascination Edition Two (Blue Note, 2001)
- Denman Maroney, Fluxations (New World/CounterCurrents 2003)
- Raz Mesinai, Cyborg Acoustics (Tzadik, 2004)
- Sato Michihiro, Rodan (hat ART, 1989)
- Tisziji Munoz, Auspicious Healing! (Anami Music, 2000)
- Simon Nabatov, Projections (Clean Feed, 2015)
- Simon Nabatov, Equal Poise (Leo, 2016)
- James Newton, Binu (Circle, 1978)
- Kevin Norton, Integrated Variables (CIMP, 1996)
- Kevin Norton, Change Dance Troubled Energy (Barking Hoop, 2001)
- Ivo Perelman, Suite for Helen F. (Boxholder, 2003)
- Hot Pstromi, With a Little Horseradish On the Side (Global Village Music, 1993)
- Hank Roberts, Black Pastels (JMT, 1988)
- Herb Robertson, Elaboration (Clean Feed, 2005)
- Herb Robertson, Real Aberration (Clean Feed, 2007)
- Mick Rossi, One Block from Planet Earth (OmniTone, 2004)
- Ned Rothenberg, Power Lines (New World, 1995)
- Bernadette Speach, Reflections (Mode, 2002)
- Yale Strom, Klezmer: Cafe Jew Zoo (Naxos, 2002)
- Richard Teitelbaum, Blends (New Albion, 2002)
- Tiziano Tononi, Strange Mathematics (Splasc(H), 2008)
- Eric Watson, Silent Hearts (Free Flight, 1999)
- Eric Watson, Full Metal Quartet (OWL, 2000)
- Matthias Ziegler, Marsyas' Song (Percords, 1992)
