= Herb Robertson =

American jazz musician (1951–2024)

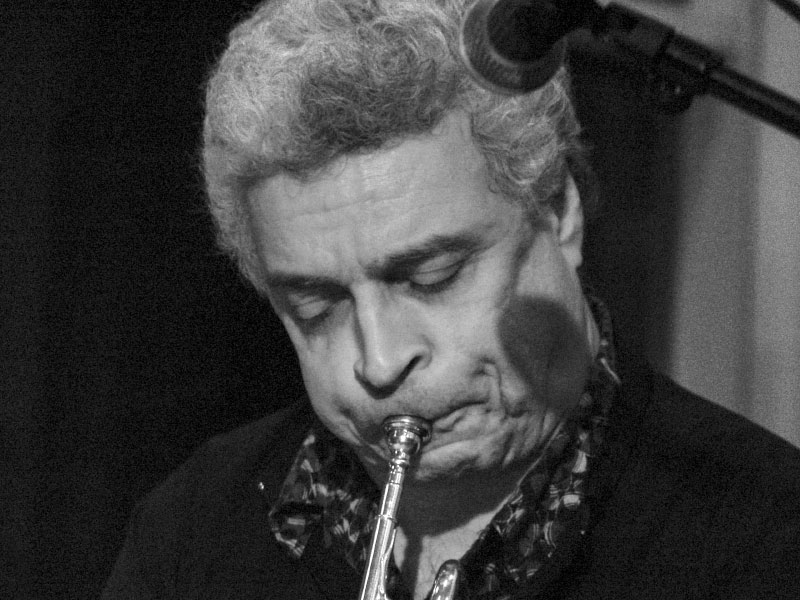
- Robertson in 2008

Background information
- Born: Clarence C. Robertson; February 21, 1951; Plainfield, New Jersey, U.S.
- Died: December 10, 2024 (aged 73) Whiting, New Jersey, U.S.
- Genres: Jazz
- Instruments: Trumpet; flugelhorn
- Website: herbrobertson.com

Clarence C. "Herb" Robertson (February 21, 1951 – December 10, 2024) was an American jazz trumpeter and flugelhornist. He was born in Plainfield, New Jersey, on February 21, 1951, and attended the Berklee College of Music. He recorded solo albums and worked as a sideman for Tim Berne, Anthony Davis, Bill Frisell, George Gruntz, Paul Motian, Bobby Previte, and David Sanborn. Robertson died in Whiting, New Jersey, on December 10, 2024, at the age of 73.

== Discography ==
=== As leader ===
- Transparency (JMT, 1985)
- X-Cerpts: Live at Willisau (JMT, 1987)
- Shades of Bud Powell (JMT, 1988)
- Certified (JMT, 1991)
- Falling in Flat Space (Cadence Jazz, 1996) with Dominic Duval and Jay Rosen
- Sound Implosion (CIMP, 1997) with Dominic Duval and Jay Rosen
- Ritual (CIMP, 2000) with Phil Haynes
- Brooklyn-Berlin (CIMP, 2000) with Phil Haynes
- Knudstock 2000 (Cadence, 2000)
- Music for Long Attention Spans (Leo, 2001)
- The Legend of the Missing Link (Septet & Quintet) (Splasc(h), 2001)
- Elaboration (Clean Feed, 2005)
- Sketches from the Other Side, For A.I. (Ruby Flower, 2006)
- Parallelisms (Ruby Flower, 2007) with Evan Parker and Agustí Fernández
- Real Aberration (Clean Feed, 2007)
- Celebrations (Leo, 2007) with Frank Gratkowski, Simon Nabatov, and Dieter Manderscheid
- Live at Alchemia (Not Two, 2007) with Marcin Oleś and Bartłomiej Oleś
- Passing the Torch (Ruby Flower, 2008) with Jean-Luc Cappozzo
- Diablo en musica - Improvisations (Out/In Space, 2008) with Rich Messbauer and Tom Sayek
- Party Enders (Not Two, 2011) with Dave Kaczorowski and Adrian Valosin
- Rumble Seat (Not Two, 2012) with Steve Rust and Harvey Sorgen

=== As sideman ===
With Ray Anderson

- Big Band Record (Gramavision, 1994) with the George Gruntz Concert Jazz Band

With Tim Berne

- The Ancestors (Soul Note, 1983)
- Sanctified Dreams (Columbia, 1987)
- Tim Berne's Fractured Fairy Tales (JMT, 1989)
- Pace Yourself (JMT, 1991)
- Diminutive Mysteries (Mostly Hemphill) (JMT, 1993)
- Nice View (JMT, 1994)
- Open, Coma (Screwgun, 2001)

With Marc Ducret

- News from the Front (JMT, 1992)

With Mark Helias

- Split Image (Enja, 1984)
- The Current Set (Enja, 1987)
- Desert Blue (Enja, 1989)
- Attack the Future (Enja, 1992)

With Andy Laster

- Twirler (Sound Aspects, 1990)
- Hydra (Sound Aspects, 1994)
- Polyogue (Songlines, 1995)
- Soft Shell (Knitting Factory, 2000; recorded 1998)

With Satoko Fujii Orchestra New York

- South Wind (Leo/Libra, 1997)
- The Future of the Past (Enja, 2001)
- Blueprint (MTC, 2003)
- Undulation (PJL, 2005)
- Summer Suite (Libra, 2007)
- Eto (Libra, 2010)

==== With others ====
- Stefan Winter - The Little Trumpet (JMT, 1986)
- Michael Moore Quintet – Home Game (Ramboy, 1992; recorded 1988)
- Lindsey Horner – Never No More (Open Minds, 1991; recorded 1989)
- The New York Composers Orchestra - Music by Marty Ehrlich, Robin Holcomb, Wayne Horvitz, Doug Wieselman (New World, 1990)
- Bobby Previte – Music of the Moscow Circus (Gramavision, 1991)
- Roberto Zorzi with Tim Berne, Bobby Previte, Mark Feldman, Herb Robertson, Matteo Ederle, Percy Jones - The Bang (Nueva, 1991; reissued as Bang! by ICTUS, 2011)
- Marc Ducret - News from the Front (JMT, 1992)
- Lesli Dalaba - Core Samples (EarRational, 1992)
- Anthony Davis - X: The Life and Times of Malcolm X, An Opera in Three Acts (Gramavision, 1992)
- Klaus König - The Song of Songs (Enja, 1992)
- Sibylle Pomorin / Terry Jenoure - Auguries of Speed (ITM, 1995)
- Paul Lytton Quartet - The Balance of Trade (CIMP, 1996)
- Lou Grassi's PoBand - Mo' Po (CIMP, 1997)
- Joe Fonda - From the Source (Konnex, 1997)
- Barry Guy New Orchestra - Inscape–Tableaux (Intakt, 2001)
- Jay Rosen Trio - Drums 'n Bugles (CIMP, 2001)
- Dominic Duval with Herb Robertson, Bob Hovey, Jay Rosen - Asylem (Leo, 2001)
- Joe Lovano – Viva Caruso (Blue Note, 2002)
- The Fonda / Stevens Group - Twelve Improvisations (Leo, 2004; recorded 2002)
- Mokuto (with Lotte Anker) - Dressed Like a Horse (Ninth World, 2007; recorded 2003)
- Gerry Hemingway Quartet – The Whimbler (Clean Feed, 2004)
- Lou Grassi Quartet - Avanti Galoppi (CIMP, 2004)
- Lou Grassi's PoBand - Infinite Potential (CIMP, 2005)
- Barry Guy New Orchestra - Oort–Entropy (Intakt, 2005)
- Stefan Winter - Der Kastanienball / The Chestnut Ball - The Fall of Lucrezia Borgia, "audio film" (Winter & Winter, 2005)
- Pierre Dørge & New Jungle Orchestra - Negra Tigra (ILK, 2005)
- Alípio C. Neto Quartet – The Perfume Comes Before the Flower (Clean Feed, 2008)
- Barry Guy London Jazz Composers Orchestra - Harmos - Live in Schaffhausen (Intakt DVD, 2012; recorded 2008)
- 100nka & Herb Robertson – Superdesert (Not Two, 2009)
- Barry Guy and the London Jazz Composers' Orchestra with Irène Schweizer – Radio Rondo/Schaffhausen Concert (Intakt, 2009)
- Essex Improvisor's Collective "Lifting The Light" Fred Taylor Music 2010
