= Arcado String Trio =

The Arcado String Trio was first an American, later international jazz trio active from 1989 to 1993. The ensemble was formed by cellist Hank Roberts, bassist Mark Dresser and violinist Mark Feldman. Roberts was replaced by Ernst Reijseger. The Trio has performed not only as a chamber music ensemble but also for a project by Manfred Niehaus (1991) with the WDR Rundfunkorchester Köln and as Double Trio together with the Trio de clarinettes of Jacques Di Donato, Louis Sclavis, and Armand Angster.

The Arcado String Trio drew inspiration from Billy Bang's String Trio of New York and the Kronos Quartet. Their chamber music showed influences of Django Reinhardt and Jimi Hendrix.

== Selected discography ==
- 1989 - Arcado String Trio (JMT Records)
- 1991 - Behind the Myth (JMT)
- 1992 - For Three Strings and Orchestra (JMT/WDR), with the WDR Rundfunkorchester Köln conducted by David de Villiers
- 1995 - Double Trio Green Dolphy Suite (Enja)
- 2020 - Deep Resonance, with Ivo Perelman (Fundacja Słuchaj)

== Bibliography ==
- Richard Cook & Brian Morton: The Penguin Guide to Jazz on CD. Penguin, 6th Edition, London, 2002. ISBN 0-14-017949-6
