= Azure (Gary Peacock and Marilyn Crispell album) =

Studio album by Gary Peacock and Marilyn Crispell
- Released: 2013
- Recorded: January and February 2011
- Studio: Nevessa Production; Saugerties, New York
- Genre: Free jazz
- Label: ECM; ECM 2292
- Producer: Gary Peacock, Marilyn Crispell

Gary Peacock chronology
Azure (2013)	Now This (2015)

Azure is an album by bassist Gary Peacock and pianist Marilyn Crispell. It was recorded at Nevessa Production in Saugerties, New York in January and February 2011, and was released on ECM in 2013.

Peacock and Crispell had previously recorded together as part of a trio with drummer Paul Motian on Nothing Ever Was, Anyway: Music of Annette Peacock (1997) and Amaryllis (2001), and would reunite again on In Motion (2016) in a trio with drummer Richard Poole. Crispell recalled that she had looked forward to recording with Peacock as a duo for years, and reflected: "He and I have played a lot of duo tours, and we've always wanted to document our partnership – but it just never came to pass. It was so great to finally have the chance to do it."

== Reception ==
Professional ratings
Review scores
Source	Rating
DownBeat	4/5 stars
AllMusic	4/5 stars
The Guardian	4/5 stars
PopMatters	7/10 stars
The Irish Times	4/5 stars
All About Jazz	5/5 stars

DownBeat reviewer John Corbett described the album as "deeply engaging," calling Peacock "equally alert and penetrating, paradoxically somehow both direct and oblique," and depicting Crispell's impressionistic playing as "radiance and darkness locking horns."

In a review for AllMusic, Thom Jurek wrote: "It sounds like the seamless interplay between the two is not improvised but composed and arranged. On Azure, the effortless communication between these players is like a conversation that is so intimate it can, at times, feel as if the listener is eavesdropping. Hopefully these two will be motivated to do this again."

Nate Chinen, in an article for The New York Times, called the album "a conversational study with an implied commitment to parity," and stated: "The results are often starkly beautiful, with the sort of contemplative glow that only maturity seems to provide."

Writing for The Guardian, John Fordham commented: "Crispell was an unruly free-jazz keyboard cyclone for years, but now combines that command in dizzyingly open situations with delicacy and patience; Peacock, a deep-rooted standard-songs player... has a voluminous vocabulary that doesn't desert him at the point when song structures dissolve... 'You have to have an open mind – even no mind, a clear mind' to play this way, Peacock the Buddhist says, and you can hear what he means all through Azure."

In a review for Jazz Times, Lloyd Sachs remarked: "While there's nothing surprising about how gracefully attuned to each other they are here, the intuitive power they achieve in this intimate setting is still striking. So is the range of moods and emotions that eloquently unfold."

Will Layman, writing for PopMatters, referred to the album as "another gem, a delicate but insistently thorny recording that resists being limited by expectations or options," and stated: "I recommend the kind of active listening that makes a release like this—a slice of sparkling jazz magic—come alive."

In an article for London Jazz News, Geoff Winston called the recording "an album which is imbued with a sense of calm beauty, with a puckish overlay of sprightly movement and invention," and stated that it "just invites return visits. Beautiful."

Writing for The Irish Times, Cormac Larkin commented: "On this delicate, beautifully poised set, it is a mark of both players' openness and integrity that they don't cleave to any particular style but follow wherever the music takes them – from near-abstract improvisations to lyrical blues- and folk-tinged compositions."

John Kelman, in a review for All About Jazz, wrote: "Azure demonstrates, with pristine clarity and utter transparency, a unique partnership now finally unveiled for a larger audience on the year's most superb—and revealing—duo recording."

Regarding the pairing of Crispell and Peacock, writer Brian Morton stated: "Some will perhaps compare the relationship to that between Bill Evans and Scott LaFaro, but that gets the emphases all wrong. Listen again to how Coltrane and Garrison locked and separated, how the one fed the other or fed off him and then swooped away to a place of his own, and you're much closer to getting the feel and spirit of this terrific record."

== Track listing ==
1. "Patterns" (Crispell) – 7:18
2. "Goodbye" (Crispell) – 6:18
3. "Leapfrog" (Peacock/Crispell) – 5:47
4. "Bass Solo" (Peacock) – 3:08
5. "Waltz After David M" (Crispell) – 9:23
6. "Lullaby" (Peacock) – 6:38
7. "The Lea" (Peacock) – The Lea
8. "Blue" (Peacock/Crispell) – 5:42
9. "Piano Solo" (Crispell) – 2:27
10. "Puppets" (Peacock) – 3:40
11. "3:40" (Peacock/Crispell) – 6:03

== Personnel ==
- Marilyn Crispell – piano
- Gary Peacock – bass
