= Streams (Yuma Uesaka and Marilyn Crispell album) =

Studio album by Yuma Uesaka and Marilyn Crispell
- Released: 2021
- Recorded: November 29, 2018, and March 12, 2019
- Studio: Nevessa Production, Woodstock, New York and The Buddy Project, Queens, New York
- Genre: Jazz
- Label: Not Two Records; MW1010-2

Streams is an album by saxophonist and clarinetist Yuma Uesaka and pianist Marilyn Crispell. It was recorded on November 29, 2018, at Nevessa Production in Woodstock, New York, with additional recording taking place on March 12, 2019, at The Buddy Project in Queens, New York. The album was released in 2021 by Not Two Records.

Streams is the pair's first recording as a duo, and was conceived by Uesaka as a continuation of Crispell's previous duo encounters with reed players Anthony Braxton (Duets Vancouver 1989) and Joseph Jarman (Connecting Spirits). The album's final track features guest artist Chatori Shimizu on shō, and reflects the musicians' interest in traditional Japanese music.

According to Uesaka, he and Crispell visited Nevessa studio with the intention of simply playing together. When they arrived, he "asked Marilyn, since we were already going to be in a recording studio, if we could hit the record button... That is kind of how the recording happened."

== Reception ==
Professional ratings
Review scores
Source	Rating
All About Jazz	4/5 stars

In a review for All About Jazz, John Sharpe wrote: "Uesaka's writing provides attractive frameworks within which the pair can interact... Even on the most animated numbers, Crispell balances control and expression, to keep within the parameters of the composition... Uesaka shows that he has arrived with a mature conception, and the tools to execute it, all promising more to savour in the future."

Tyran Grillo, writing for The New York City Jazz Record, commented: "this meeting of minds is about connecting moments as one would a constellation: each piece is minimally indicative of its title and, over time, seems to take on those characteristics as if by default." He praised the musicians' "willingness to move wherever the winds of inspiration blow—this, despite the through-written nature of every melody Uesaka offers on the altar of improvisation."

The Big Takeover's Michael Toland stated: "the pair balance composition with improvisation, elegant lyricism with jagged chaos... there's little doubt you'll be happy to float along these Streams."

In an article for Making A Scene, Jim Hynes remarked: "Streams... is 'out there' but much of it is accessible enough to warrant listens from those who love improvisational work and are not necessarily avant-garde devotees... Crispell and Uesaka play brilliantly. It's all here – lyricism, angular rhythms, judicious use of space, tension, calm. Listen freely and often."

Writing for Jazz Trail, Filipe Freitas called the album "an explorative duo session that merges their modern free universes," and commented: "Although belonging to different generations, the musicians display a formidable sense of unity that makes their music a genuine pleasure to listen to... Don't sleep on this record because there's plenty of detail to be admired and enough sagacity and enchantment to make it notable."

Eyal Hareuveni of Salt Peanuts wrote: "Streams is intimate and meditative, intellectual but emotive, and clearly a highly poetic and spiritual musical meeting of kindred spirits... The title of the album reflects the essence of this meeting. An organic and subtle flow of sounds, silences, ideas and gestures."

Reviewing the album for Jazz Word, Ken Waxman remarked: "the intersections move closer to Chamber Jazz feeling with extended ballad-like changes on some tracks and straight-ahead elaborations on others. Still enough sound shards and bent notes are emphasized to keep the program fluid, accurate and innovative."

== Track listing ==
All compositions by Yuma Uesaka.

1. "Meditation" – 2:46
2. "Iterations I" – 6:17
3. "Streams" – 11:085
4. "Capillarity" – 7:58
5. "Torrent" – 3:51
6. "Ma / Space" – 8:59

== Personnel ==
- Yuma Uesaka – saxophone, clarinet
- Marilyn Crispell – piano
- Chatori Shimizu – shō (track 6)
