= The Kitchen Concert =

Live album by Marilyn Crispell
- Released: 1991
- Recorded: February 2, 3 & 4, 1989
- Venue: The Kitchen, New York City
- Genre: Jazz
- Length: 50:11
- Label: Leo
- Producer: Leo Feigin

Marilyn Crispell chronology
Live in San Francisco (1990)	The Kitchen Concert (1991)	Overlapping Hands: Eight Segments (1991)

The Kitchen Concert is an album by American jazz pianist Marilyn Crispell, which was recorded live at The Kitchen, New York City in 1989 and released on the English Leo label.

== Background ==
The primary inspirations on the album include the blues, African drumming and the music of Lennie Tristano. The pieces were commissioned by the New York arts organisation Roulette as part of their tenth birthday celebrations. Crispell, bassist Mark Dresser and drummer Gerry Hemingway played together many times in the Anthony Braxton quartet, but this was their debut performance as a trio.

The title of the composition "What of it I Refuse Awakes the Wide-Eyed Stone" is from a line in the poem "The Sleeping Rocks" by Nathaniel Mackey, published in the 1985 collection Eroding Witness. The score was published in a special issue of Callaloo dedicated to Mackey.

== Reception ==
Professional ratings
Review scores
Source	Rating
AllMusic	3/5 stars
The Penguin Guide to Jazz	3/4 stars

The Penguin Guide to Jazz states "This marks a slight but significant change of direction. In place of free or structured improvisation, The Kitchen Concert documents a first, rather tentative, confrontation with written forms of her own."

== Track listing ==
All compositions by Marilyn Crispell

1. "Solstice" – 4:44
2. "What of it I Refuse Awakes the Wide-Eyed Stone" – 7:42
3. "Alchemy" – 8:05
4. "Ahmadu/Sierra Leone" – 8:23
5. "Night Light Beach I" – 5:06
6. "For L.T." – 15:58

== Personnel ==
- Marilyn Crispell – piano
- Mark Dresser - bass
- Gerry Hemingway - drums
