= Inference (album) =

Live album by Marilyn Crispell and Tim Berne
- Released: 1995
- Recorded: June 25, 1992
- Venue: Toronto Downtown Jazz Festival, Canada
- Genre: Jazz
- Length: 54:29
- Label: Music & Arts; CD-851
- Producer: Serge Sloimovits

Tim Berne chronology
| Poisoned Minds: The Paris Concert (1995) | Inference (1995) | Unwound (1996) |

Marilyn Crispell chronology
| Highlights from the Summer of 1992 American Tour (1993) | Inference (1995) | Hyperion (1995) |

Inference is a live album by pianist Marilyn Crispell and saxophonist Tim Berne which was recorded during the Toronto Jazz Festival in 1992 and released on the Music & Arts label.

== Reception ==
Professional ratings
Review scores
| Source | Rating |
|---|---|
| AllMusic | 3/5 stars |
| The Penguin Guide to Jazz | 3/4 stars |

The AllMusic review by Scott Yanow said "This set has plenty of stimulating and unpredictable interplay by the two giants (both of whom sound as if they have large ears). Music & Arts deserves thanks from the jazz world for making these noncommercial sounds available"

The Penguin Guide to Jazz notes that "This is not a great astonishment, not is it as good as it might be. Berne's curious bluester often overpowers what otherwise seems impressively vivid and reciprocal music-making."

== Track listing ==
All compositions by Marilyn Crispell except as indicated

1. "For Alto and Piano II" - 9:43
2. "Ho' Time" (Tim Berne) - 10:39
3. "Inference" (Berne) - 10:51
4. "Sorrow" - 9:31
5. "Bass Voodoo" (Berne) - 8:22
6. "Only Paradise" - 5:03

== Personnel ==
- Tim Berne - alto saxophone
- Marilyn Crispell - piano
