= En Adir =

Studio album by Ivo Perelman
- Released: 1997
- Recorded: October 1996
- Studio: Systems Two, Brooklyn
- Genre: Jazz
- Length: 56:29
- Label: Music & Arts
- Producer: Ivo Perelman

Ivo Perelman chronology
Revelation (1997)	En Adir (1997)	Sound Hierarchy (1997)

En Adir, subtitled Traditional Jewish Songs, is an album by the Brazilian jazz saxophonist Ivo Perelman, recorded in 1996 and released on the Music & Arts label. He leads a quartet with pianist Marilyn Crispell, drummer Gerry Hemingway and bassist William Parker.

== Reception ==
Professional ratings
Review scores
Source	Rating
AllMusic	4.5/5 stars
The Penguin Guide to Jazz	3/4 stars

In his review for AllMusic, Alex Henderson states: "Perelman is no stranger to atonality, but this time, he goes the 'inside/outside' route. Although some of the 'outside' passages are blistering, he pays a great deal of attention to melody and sounds absolutely delighted by the melodies he's interpreting."

The Penguin Guide to Jazz wrote that the album "is an interesting departure, but it's only intermittently effective."

== Track listing ==
1. "L'Shana Haba'a" (traditional) - 6:01
2. "Chag Purim" (folk) - 10:57
3. "Yaldut" (Perelman/Crispell/Hemingway/Parker) - 8:042
4. "Avinu Malkenu" (liturgy folksong) - 8:46
5. "Retiro Bom" (Perelman/Crispell/Hemingway/Parker) - 6:24
6. "En Adir" (folk) - 9:29
7. "L'Shana Haba'a" (traditional) - 5:45

== Personnel ==
- Ivo Perelman - tenor sax
- Marilyn Crispell - piano
- Gerry Hemingway - drums
- William Parker - bass
