= Duo (Marilyn Crispell and Gerry Hemingway album) =

Live album by Marilyn Crispell & Gerry Hemingway
- Released: 1992
- Recorded: February 1989
- Venue: Knitting Factory, New York City
- Genre: Jazz
- Length: 74:12
- Label: Knitting Factory

Marilyn Crispell chronology
Overlapping Hands: Eight Segments (1991)	Duo (1992)	Piano Duets (for tuned and detuned pianos) (1992)

Duo (also referred to as Marilyn Crispell and Gerry Hemingway Duo) is an album by American jazz pianist Marilyn Crispell with drummer Gerry Hemingway, which was recorded in 1989 and released on the Knitting Factory label.

== Reception ==
Professional ratings
Review scores
Source	Rating
AllMusic	4.5/5 stars
The Penguin Guide to Jazz	3/4 stars

In his review for AllMusic, Michael G. Nastos states "Crispell truly has transcended the Cecil Taylor approach to make music that is all her own, while Hemingway is marvelous in his ability to shade, contrast, punctuate, and complement everything she does. A match made on earth, speaking to the heavens, and some of the ultimate improvised music made for this genre in the '90s."

The authors of the Penguin Guide to Jazz Recordings wrote that Hemingway is "a strong but by no means aggressive player" who "concentrates in the spaces in the music, stippling them with detail."

== Track listing ==
1. "Rotations" (Marilyn Crispell) – 11:12
2. "Swailing" (Gerry Hemingway) – 8:02
3. "Billy Duck" (Marilyn Crispell) – 7:07
4. "Thumbrill" (Gerry Hemingway) – 8:00
5. "Gravity" (Marilyn Crispell) – 7:18
6. "In October" (Marilyn Crispell) – 6:14
7. "Last Stand" (Gerry Hemingway) – 8:04
8. "Ice 2" (Gerry Hemingway) – 10:14
9. "Jump" (Marilyn Crispell) – 8:01

== Personnel ==
- Marilyn Crispell – piano
- Gerry Hemingway - drums
