= Live in San Francisco (Marilyn Crispell album) =

Live album by Marilyn Crispell
- Released: 1990
- Recorded: October 20, 1989
- Venue: New Langton Arts, San Francisco, California
- Genre: Free Jazz
- Label: Music & Arts; CD-633
- Producer: Maggi Payne

Live in San Francisco is a live solo piano album by Marilyn Crispell. It was recorded at New Langton Arts in San Francisco, California in October 1989, and was released in 1990 by Music & Arts.

A pair of tracks labeled "samples of two other Music & Arts CDs in which Marilyn Crispell appears as a performer" follow the solo piano recordings on the disc. Anthony Braxton's "Composition 136" previously appeared on the album Duets Vancouver 1989, and was recorded on June 30, 1989, at the Vancouver International Jazz Festival. "Wha's Nine?", by Reggie Workman, previously appeared on the album Images: The Reggie Workman Ensemble, and was recorded on July 8, 1989, at The Knitting Factory in New York City.

== Reception ==
Professional ratings
Review scores
Source	Rating
AllMusic	4/5 stars
The Penguin Guide to Jazz	3.5/4 stars

In a review for AllMusic, Scott Yanow wrote: "This is the Marilyn Crispell CD to start out with. The avant-garde pianist... explores eight selections during a dynamic live set. In addition to five originals, Crispell plays very fresh (and unpredictable) versions of 'When I Fall in Love,' Thelonious Monk's 'Ruby, My Dear,' and John Coltrane's spiritual 'Dear Lord'... Invigorating music.".

The authors of the Penguin Guide to Jazz Recordings stated: "Recorded shortly after the Californian earthquake of 1989, it alternates the subdued aftershocks and beatific restorations of her own 'Tromo' and Coltrane's 'Dear Lord' with some unexpectedly light and romantic touches. 'When I Fall in Love' has a hesitant shyness that makes the theme statement all the more moving; the same applies to the humour of Monk's 'Ruby, My Dear', which underlines Crispell's impressive rhythmic awareness."

== Track listing ==
=== Solo piano ===
1. "Penumbra" (Crispell) – 12:02
2. "Zipporah" (Crispell) – 5:52
3. "When I Fall in Love" (Victor Young) – 6:41
4. "Ruby, My Dear" (Thelonious Monk) – 6:39
5. "Misconception" (Crispell) – 8:28
6. "Tromos" (Crispell) – 5:43
7. "Dear Lord" (John Coltrane) – 6:19
8. "Encore" (Crispell) – 1:30
- Recorded live on October 20, 1989, at New Langton Arts, San Francisco, California.

== Personnel for tracks 1–8 ==
- Marilyn Crispell – piano

=== Samples of two other Music & Arts CDs in which Marilyn Crispell appears as a performer ===
9. "Composition 136" (Anthony Braxton) – 10:10
10. "Wha's Nine?" (Reggie Workman) – 5:30
- Track 9 recorded on June 30, 1989, at the Vancouver Jazz Festival, Vancouver, Canada. Track 10 recorded on July 8, 1989, at The Knitting Factory in New York City.

== Personnel for tracks 9–10 ==
- Marilyn Crispell – piano
- Anthony Braxton – saxophone (track 9)
- Don Byron – clarinet (track 10)
- Jeanne Lee – vocals (track 10)
- Reggie Workman – bass (track 10)
- Michele Navazio – guitar (track 10)
- Gerry Hemingway – percussion (track 10)
