= Connecting Spirits =

Live album by Joseph Jarman and Marilyn Crispell
- Released: 1996
- Recorded: January 12, 1996
- Venue: First Unitarian Society Meeting House, Madison, Wisconsin
- Genre: Jazz
- Length: 58:51
- Label: Music & Arts
- Producer: Scott Fields

Joseph Jarman chronology
Calypso's Smile (1991)	Connecting Spirits (1996)	Pachinko Dream Track 10 (1997)

Marilyn Crispell chronology
Contrast: Live at Yoshi's (1996)	Connecting Spirits (1996)	Nothing Ever Was, Anyway: Music of Annette Peacock (1997)

Connecting Spirits is an album by American jazz saxophonist Joseph Jarman and pianist Marilyn Crispell, which was recorded live in 1996 and released on the Music & Arts label.

== Background ==
After several years of semi-retirement (his work as a Buddhist priest, poet, and teacher of aikido taken him away from musical activity), Jarman reemerged to perform with Crispell as a duo for the first time at the Frank Lloyd Wright designed First Unitarian Society Meeting House in Madison, Wisconsin. They have both already separately joined duets with Anthony Braxton and smalls groups with Fred Anderson and the two were in Madison to play together on a recording by another mutual connection, guitarist Scott Fields. In subsequent concerts Gerry Hemingway joined the pair.

Crispell and Jarman have both composed and performed tributes to John Coltrane in their careers: Crispell with her album For Coltrane and Jarman with the piece "Ohnedaruth" on the Art Ensemble of Chicago's Phase One. Here they play Coltrane's composition "Dear Lord".

== Reception ==
Professional ratings
Review scores
Source	Rating
Allmusic	3.5/5 stars
The Penguin Guide to Jazz	3/4 stars
Tom Hull – on the Web	B+

In his review for AllMusic, Scott Yanow states "Not everything works, but overall this is a stimulating set and it is nice to hear Jarman featured in this setting." The Penguin Guide to Jazz says about Jarman "Like everything he does, it is thoughtful, passionate and somewhat enigmatic, a lateral approach to fairly basic material, and a technically modest exercise in saxophone artistry."

== Track listing ==
1. "For Joseph" (Marilyn Crispell) – 11:33
2. "MCPS" (Marilyn Crispell) – 3:34
3. "Structure I" (Crispell/Jarman) – 8:21
4. "Upper Reaches" (Joseph Jarman) – 5:38
5. "Dear Lord" (John Coltrane) – 9:54
6. "Connectivity" (Crispell/Jarman) – 5:22
7. "Meditations on a Vow of Compassion" (Joseph Jarman) – 14:29

== Personnel ==
- Joseph Jarman - alto sax, flute
- Marilyn Crispell – piano
