= Sound Hierarchy =

Studio album by Ivo Perelman
- Released: 1997
- Recorded: October 1996
- Studio: Systems Two, Brooklyn
- Genre: Jazz
- Length: 56:37
- Label: Music & Arts
- Producer: Ivo Perelman

Ivo Perelman chronology
En Adir (1997)	Sound Hierarchy (1997)	Strings (1997)

Sound Hierarchy is an album by the Brazilian jazz saxophonist Ivo Perelman, recorded in 1996 and released on the Music & Arts label. He leads a quartet with pianist Marilyn Crispell, drummer Gerry Hemingway and bassist William Parker.

== Reception ==
Professional ratings
Review scores
Source	Rating
AllMusic	4.5/5 stars
The Penguin Guide to Jazz	3/4 stars

In his review for AllMusic, Alex Henderson states: "Short of Charles Gayle, you won't find any 1990s avant-garde jazz that is more incendiary, ferocious and violent than Sound Hierarchy."

The Penguin Guide to Jazz notes that "Crispell is too strong a personality to settle for the kind of subsidiary role that Perelman needs, and Hemingway's rhythms are too bracingly inventive - they offer Perelman a distraction rather than fed lines."

== Track listing ==
All titles are collective works except as indicated

1. "Frozen Tears" - 18:54
2. "Sound Hierarchy" - 7:29
3. "Datchki Dandara" (Ivo Perelman) - 12:20
4. "Fragments" - 17:33

== Personnel ==
- Ivo Perelman - tenor sax, mouthpiece on 2
- Marilyn Crispell - piano
- Gerry Hemingway - drums, voice on 2
- William Parker - bass
