= Live in Zurich =

Live in Zurich may refer to:

- Live in Zurich (World Saxophone Quartet album)
- Live in Zurich (Marilyn Crispell album)
