= Stellar Pulsations / Three Composers =

Studio album by Marilyn Crispell
- Released: 1994
- Recorded: February 11, 1992; March 26, 1992; July 10 and 13, 1992
- Studio: Jordan Hall, NEC, Boston; WGBH-FM, Boston; WDR Cologne
- Label: Leo Records; CD LR 194

Stellar Pulsations / Three Composers is an album by pianist Marilyn Crispell on which she performs works written for her by composers Robert Cogan, Pozzi Escot, and Manfred Niehaus. The Cogan work, "Costellar Pulsations," features Crispell with a second pianist, Ellen Polansky, and was recorded on February 11, 1992, at Jordan Hall, New England Conservatory of Music in Boston. Escot's piece, "Mirabilis II," was performed by Crispell along with clarinetist Don Byron and drummer Gerry Hemingway, and was recorded on March 26, 1992, at Studio One, WGBH-FM in Boston. "Concerto for Marilyn," the composition by Niehaus, features Crispell as soloist with the WDR Radio Orchestra, conducted by David de Villiers, and was recorded on July 10 and 13, 1992, at the Grosser Sendesaal (Great Hall) of WDR Cologne. The album was released in 1994 by Leo Records.

Cogan's "Costellar Pulsations" involves the juxtaposition of an improvising pianist (Crispell) and one who performs from a notated score that uses mobile form (Polansky). The composer stated: "Among musicians and listeners, composition and improvisation have become quasi-religious issues, with dogmatic absolutists on both sides of the fence. My personal folly is to try to reconnect the two." The title of Escot's "Mirabilis II" is from a work by the medieval composer Hildegard of Bingen. The score provides precise rhythmic, harmonic, and melodic notation, providing a framework for improvisation. Niehaus's "Concerto for Marilyn" contains references to the Marx Brothers, and features a piano part that is a mix of notated and improvised music. The orchestra part is fully notated.

== Reception ==
Professional ratings
Review scores
Source	Rating
AllMusic	3/5 stars
The Penguin Guide to Jazz	4/4 stars
Tom Hull – on the Web	B

In a review for AllMusic, Thom Jurek stated: "Crispell's playing, is, as always, even when restraining herself, exceptional: deep, solid, graceful."

The authors of the Penguin Guide to Jazz Recordings awarded the album 4 stars, and wrote: "Though less likely to appeal to straight jazz fans, this is another beautiful record, and, in its way, another important stage in Crispell's development as an artist."

== Track listing ==
=== Costellar Pulsations (Robert Cogan) ===
1. "Costellar Pulsations" – 12:12
- Recorded on February 11, 1992, at Jordan Hall, New England Conservatory, Boston.

=== Mirabilis II (Pozzi Escot) ===
2. "First Movement" – 9:02
3. "Second Movement" – 3:45
4. "Third Movement" – 3:56
- Recorded on March 26, 1992, at Studio One, WGBH-FM, Boston.

=== Concerto For Marilyn (Manfred Niehaus) ===
5. "Part I: Chico" – 4:45
6. "Part II: The Unhoused Tango" – 6:36
7. "Part III: Concerto for Harpo" – 2:55
8. "Part IV: Concerto to Provoke Groucho" – 9:40
- Recorded on July 10 and 13, 1992, at Grosser Sendesaal, WDR Cologne.

== Personnel ==
- Marilyn Crispell – piano
- Ellen Polansky – piano (track 1)
- Don Byron – clarinet (tracks 2–4)
- Gerry Hemingway – drums (tracks 2–4)
- WDR Radio Orchestra (tracks 5–8)
- David de Villiers, conductor (tracks 5–8)
