= Live at Mills College, 1995 =

Live album by Marilyn Crispell
- Released: 1995
- Recorded: January 27, 1995
- Venue: Mills College, Oakland, California
- Genre: Jazz
- Label: Music & Arts; CD-899

Live at Mills College, 1995 is a live solo piano album by Marilyn Crispell. It was recorded at Mills College in Oakland, California in January 1995, and was released later that year by Music & Arts.

== Reception ==
Professional ratings
Review scores
Source	Rating
AllMusic	4/5 stars
The Penguin Guide to Jazz	3.5/4 stars
The Virgin Encyclopedia of Jazz	4/5 stars
Tom Hull – on the Web	B+

In a review for AllMusic, Thom Jurek wrote: "Though Crispell has been recording since the 1980s, it was this set... that drew her finally into her own spotlight as both a composer and as a pianist... Crispell reveals a tonal language that includes a nearly staggering harmonic range and the timbral studies to match. Her tonal clusters are reined and freed by her ricocheting hands turning rhythmic constructs into dust and erecting new dynamics from old textural ideas. Her two hands are so busy, corralling the polytonal atmospheres she erects, that the listener can become literally dizzied by their effect... she presents a refracted vision of our fragmented musical landscape and heals it through the exploration of sonic architectures both complex and mysterious. In a word, she's awesome."

The authors of the Penguin Guide to Jazz Recordings awarded the album 3½ stars, calling it "very much a showcase performance," and praising "As Our Tongues Lap Up The Burning Air" as "incendiary." They commented: "Neither the hall acoustic nor the piano sounds quite right for a recital at a major music college, but it's possible that the poor thing is going out of tune as she plays. It has been known."

== Track listing ==
1. "Fragments" (Crispell) – 16:30
2. "Nowhere" (Crispell) / "Reflections" (Thelonious Monk) – 11:32
3. "As Our Tongues Lap Up The Burning Air" (Crispell) / "Song For Abdullah" (Crispell) / "Apart" (Crispell) – 14:28
4. "Night Moves" (Crispell) / "The Night Has A Thousand Eyes" (Ben Weisman) / "Omberg" (Crispell) – 13:09
5. "Drums" (Crispell) – 3:31

== Personnel ==
- Marilyn Crispell – piano
