= Hyperion (Marilyn Crispell, Peter Brötzmann and Hamid Drake album) =

Live album by Marilyn Crispell, Peter Brötzmann, Hamid Drake
- Released: 1995
- Recorded: June 25, 1992
- Venue: Harbourfront Centre, Toronto
- Genre: Jazz
- Length: 49:19
- Label: Music & Arts
- Producer: Serge Sloimovitz

Marilyn Crispell chronology
| Inference (1995) | Hyperion (1995) | Cascades (1995) |

Peter Brötzmann chronology
| Fragments Of Music, Life And Death Of Albert Ayler (1994) | Hyperion (1995) | The Dried Rat-Dog (1995) |

Hyperion is an album by American jazz pianist Marilyn Crispell, German multi-reedist Peter Brötzmann and drummer Hamid Drake, which was recorded live in 1992 during the Toronto Jazz Festival and released on the Music & Arts label. The trio had only played once before, a night earlier on Vancouver.

== Reception ==
Professional ratings
Review scores
| Source | Rating |
|---|---|
| AllMusic | 3/5 stars |
| The Penguin Guide to Jazz | 3.5/4 stars |
| The Virgin Encyclopedia of Jazz | 3/5 stars |

In his review for AllMusic, Scott Yanow states "The music often proceeds at a deliberate pace and sometimes utilizes a dramatic use of space, but the playing is consistently intense (particularly Brötzmann's screaming horns) before ending rather inconclusively."

The Penguin Guide to Jazz compares the album with Cascades and says that "The trio with Peter Brötzmann and Hamid Drake is, predictably, more intense and frenetic, though the saxophonist does also have his delicately lyrical side, and he defers at moments during 'Hyperion I' to Crispell's desire to take the music down a more expressive path."

== Track listing ==
All titles are collective improvisations

1. "Hyperion I" – 20:22
2. "Hyperion II" – 13:36
3. "Hyperion III" – 15:21

== Personnel ==
- Marilyn Crispell – piano
- Peter Brötzmann - saxophones, clarinets, tarogato
- Hamid Drake - drums, hand drums
