= Live in Berlin (Marilyn Crispell album) =

Live album by Marilyn Crispell
- Released: 1984
- Recorded: November 4, 1982
- Venue: Quartier Latin, Berlin
- Genre: Jazz
- Length: 46:21
- Label: Black Saint
- Producer: Giovanni Bonandrini

Marilyn Crispell chronology
Rhythms Hung in Undrawn Sky (1983)	Live in Berlin (1984)	Piano Solo – A Concert in Berlin – Summer 83 (1984)

Live in Berlin is a live album by American jazz pianist Marilyn Crispell. It was recorded in November 1982 during the Total Music Meeting, and was released on the Italian Black Saint label in 1984. On the album, is joined by violinist Billy Bang, bassist Peter Kowald, and drummer John Betsch. The piece "ABC" is dedicated to Anthony Braxton, with whom she worked beginning in 1978.

== Reception ==
Professional ratings
Review scores
Source	Rating
AllMusic	3/5 stars
The Penguin Guide to Jazz	3/4 stars

In a review for AllMusic, Scott Yanow wrote: "Crispell shows a great deal of passion on three of her originals... Violinist Billy Bang..., bassist Peter Kowald and drummer John Betsch complete the quartet on this intense concert performance."

The authors of the Penguin Guide to Jazz Recordings wrote that Crispell "holds up strongly in some pretty rugged company... Her background in classical, particularly Baroque, music is still clearly audible as she negotiates oblique contrapuntal passages and wild, seamless fugues."

== Track listing ==
All compositions by Marilyn Crispell

1. "ABC (for Anthony Braxton)" – 23:21
2. "Chant" – 6:53
3. "Burundi" – 16:07

== Personnel ==
- Marilyn Crispell – piano
- Billy Bang – violin
- Peter Kowald – bass
- John Betsch – drums
