= The Woodstock Concert =

Live album by Marilyn Crispell
- Released: 1996
- Recorded: April 21, 1995
- Venue: Kleinert/James Arts Center, Woodstock, New York
- Genre: Jazz
- Label: Music & Arts; CD-929

The Woodstock Concert is a live solo piano album by Marilyn Crispell. It was recorded at the Kleinert/James Arts Center in Woodstock, New York in April 1995, and was released in 1996 by Music & Arts.

== Reception ==
Professional ratings
Review scores
Source	Rating
AllMusic	4/5 stars
The Penguin Guide to Jazz	4/4 stars
Tom Hull – on the Web	A

In a review for AllMusic, Dean McFarlane wrote: "One of the free jazz scene's phenomenal figureheads of solo piano improvisation, Marilyn Crispell's amassed discography is as flawless as Cecil Taylor's when it comes to brilliance in solo piano performance. The Woodstock Concert was given on April 21, 1995, and on that date she performed four improvisations, a Bill Evans piece, and one Annette Peacock composition which erupts into one of the most glorious performances of Crispell's highly documented mid-'90s era. The pieces 'Await', 'In Lingering Air' and the exquisitely titled 'How Not to Anaesthetize Desire' are exceptional moments that capture some of her greatest free improvisation on recording."

The authors of the Penguin Guide to Jazz Recordings awarded the album 4 stars, and commented: "The solo performance... was something of a homecoming for the globetrotting Crispell, who has made her home in the area for the better part of twenty years but has rarely had the chance to play there. This set contains the best of her solo work for many moons... Crispell shows how completely in command she is, executing a long suite of pieces... any doubts about her quality are easily dispelled."

Critic Tom Hull stated: " Another solo, less than three months after Live at Mills College, two months before the superb Contrasts: Live at Yoshi's (1995), even more of a tour de force -- 'In Lingering Air' multiplies her percussion and harmonics into something wondrous, a level she returns to time and again, but by then even a relatively quiet stretch pulls you in."

== Track listing ==
1. "Await" (Crispell) – 8:27
2. "In Lingering Air" (Crispell) – 7:35
3. "How Not to Anaesthetize Desire" (Crispell) / "Time Remembered" (Bill Evans) – 11:08
4. "Gesture Without Plot" (Annette Peacock) – 5:35
5. "Nonetheless" (Crispell) / "Morning Pulses" (Crispell) / "Tune for Charlie" (Crispell) / "Apart" (Crispell) – 22:45
6. "Empty Sirens" (Crispell) – 1:35

== Personnel ==
- Marilyn Crispell – piano
