= Cascades (Marilyn Crispell album) =

Live album by Marilyn Crispell
- Released: 1995
- Recorded: June 26, 1993
- Venue: Western Front Lodge, Vancouver
- Genre: Jazz
- Length: 59:56
- Label: Music & Arts

Marilyn Crispell chronology
Hyperion (1995)	Cascades (1995)	Spring Tour (1995)

Cascades is an album by the American jazz pianist Marilyn Crispell, the British double bass player Barry Guy and the drummer Gerry Hemingway, which was recorded live in 1993 during the Vancouver Jazz Festival and released on the Music & Arts label. This was the first time that they worked together as a trio.

== Reception ==
Professional ratings
Review scores
Source	Rating
AllMusic	2.5/5 stars
The Penguin Guide to Jazz	3/4 stars

In his review for AllMusic, Scott Yanow wrote, "Although there is a creative use of space, the lack of any real themes or lyrical moments makes this performance much less interesting than one would expect considering the musicians involved."

The Penguin Guide to Jazz notes about the trio that "the combination is sometimes too cluttered, though the bassist also understands better than the two Americans how to leave light and shade, space and air, in this music".

== Track listing ==
All titles are collective works

1. "Ricochet" – 15:40
2. "Violet Sparks in Soft Air" – 6:40
3. "Resonances" – 5:19
4. "Cascades" – 28:48
5. "Shadow Play" – 3:13

== Personnel ==
- Marilyn Crispell – piano
- Barry Guy - double bass
- Gerry Hemingway - drums, vibraphone, gamelan
