= Blue (Marilyn Crispell and Stefano Maltese album) =

Live album by Marilyn Crispell and Stefano Maltese
- Released: 2001
- Recorded: September 7, 1999
- Venue: A.S.A.M. Auditorium, Chiesa di San Pietro, Siracusa, Italy
- Genre: Free Jazz
- Label: Black Saint; 120209-2
- Producer: Stefano Maltese

Blue is a live album by pianist Marilyn Crispell and saxophonist Stefano Maltese. It was recorded at the A.S.A.M. Auditorium in Chiesa di San Pietro, Siracusa, Italy in September 1999, and was released in 2001 by the Black Saint label. The musicians are joined by vocalist Gioconda Cilio on two tracks. The concert took place one day after the recording of the album Red at the same location.

== Reception ==
Professional ratings
Review scores
Source	Rating
AllMusic	4/5 stars
The Penguin Guide to Jazz	3/4 stars

In a review for AllMusic, Thom Jurek wrote: "Blue is easily the most mysterious and beguiling of pianist Marilyn Crispell's many releases... Maltese's interactions with Crispell are articulated on any number of instruments... This is a jazz record that moves the definition of jazz to a margin; which one isn't exactly clear, except to say that it is new and welcome and warm and heartbreakingly, poetically beautiful."

The authors of the Penguin Guide to Jazz Recordings awarded the album 3 stars, and stated: "At moments, this is uncannily similar to Marilyn's work with Anthony Braxton, except that the clarinettist is rhythmically much less open than the American... the standard of performance is very high." Regarding Cilio's participation, they noted that her presence "immediately prompt[s] the query why she wasn't more fully absorbed into these sessions."

A reviewer for The Wire described the album as a "beautifully atmospheric set of duos."

== Track listing ==
1. "Breath of Sun" (Crispell/Maltese) – 5:14
2. "Ring Around Circle" (Crispell/Maltese) – 4:13
3. "Roof of Sky" (Crispell/Maltese) – 8:18
4. "A Wind of Roses" (Crispell/Maltese) – 5:24
5. "No Scorpions in Fall" (Crispell/Maltese) – 3:52
6. "Moon-Wheel" (Crispell/Maltese) – 7:19
7. "So Glad to be Sad" (Crispell/Maltese) – 6:29
8. "You Don't Know What Love Is" (Gene de Paul) – 8:04
9. "Behind the Wings" (Crispell/Maltese) – 4:22
10. "Rain Around" (Cilio) – 5:03
11. "Burning in the Shade" (Cilio) – 7:09

== Personnel ==
- Marilyn Crispell – piano
- Stefano Maltese – soprano saxophone, alto saxophone, tenor saxophone, bass clarinet, flute
- Gioconda Cilio – vocals (tracks 10 and 11)
