= Contrasts: Live at Yoshi's (1995) =

Live album by Marilyn Crispell
- Released: 1996
- Recorded: June 27, 1995
- Venue: Yoshi's, Oakland, California
- Genre: Jazz
- Label: Music & Arts; CD-930

Contrasts: Live at Yoshi's (1995) is a live solo piano album by Marilyn Crispell. It was recorded at Yoshi's in Oakland, California in June 1995, and was released in 1996 by Music & Arts.

== Reception ==
Professional ratings
Review scores
Source	Rating
AllMusic	4/5 stars
The Penguin Guide to Jazz	4/4 stars
Tom Hull – on the Web	A−
The Virgin Encyclopedia of Jazz	3/5 stars

In a review for AllMusic, Dean McFarlane wrote: "The act of revisiting her influences is a situation in which [Crispell] commonly blooms, pushing the composition into ecstatic realms... the pianist has recorded one of the most compelling repertoires in avant-garde jazz of the late 20th century and beyond. At almost 70 minutes, this CD is utterly compelling throughout and cannot be recommended highly enough to those in love with pure innovation in jazz."

The authors of the Penguin Guide to Jazz Recordings awarded the album 4 stars, and stated: "That Bill Evans remains a constant presence, perhaps more important to her now than either Coltrane or Braxton were in past years, seems obvious. That she has assimilated his work and taken it on a step is equally clear... Gone for the time being at least are the dense, dark washes and the battering ram tonality. Crispell has found the courage to be simple, and it becomes her wonderfully well."

== Track listing ==
1. "Contrasts" (Crispell) / "Gesture Without Plot" (Annette Peacock) – 9:57
2. "Dancing" (Crispell) – 8:08
3. "Ruthie's Song" (Crispell) / "Turn Out the Stars" (Bill Evans) – 8:37
4. "Flutter" (Crispell) – 7:48
5. "Professor of Air Science" (Mark Helias) – 10:13
6. "Cousin Judi" (Crispell) – 9:41
7. "Little Chiquita" (Crispell) / "Time Remembered" (Bill Evans) – 7:16
8. "Starshine" (Crispell) / "The Night Has A Thousand Eyes" (Ben Weisman) – 7:19

== Personnel ==
- Marilyn Crispell – piano
