= This Appearing World =

Live album by Marilyn Crispell, Richard Nunns, and Jeff Henderson
- Released: 2011
- Recorded: August 20 and 21, 2008
- Venue: Kenneth Myres Centre, University of Auckland, Auckland, New Zealand
- Genre: Free Jazz
- Label: Rattle Records; RAT-D027
- Producer: Jeff Henderson, Steve Garden

This Appearing World is a live album by pianist Marilyn Crispell, Māori traditional instrumentalist Richard Nunns, and reed player Jeff Henderson. It was recorded in Auckland, New Zealand, in August 2008 and was released in 2011 by Rattle Records. The album comes with a DVD containing a video of the performance, plus an interview.

Crispell first visited New Zealand in 2000 and returned in 2008 in order to perform with Nunns and Henderson, the founder of the band Urban Taniwha.

== Reception ==
In a review for Elsewhere, Graham Reid wrote: "These 13 short, free improvisations... exist on the periphery of free jazz but, courtesy of Nunns' playing of traditional Maori instrument also suggest more ambient or impressionist soundscapes... Given the refined arthouse nature of its contents, its worldliness and other-worldiness, it is best let sit outside genre and expectation."

Writing for The Rumpus, Rick Moody commented: "This Appearing World defies categorization... like those great Codona albums of the late seventies on ECM—but even this would be to underestimate the greatness of the ensemble here. Having said all of this, Marilyn Crispell's unpredictability and singularity is hard to fathom if you have not seen her play live... There is not really anyone like Marilyn Crispell. You should hear her play."

Following Nunns's death in 2021, Steve Garden wrote that his appearance on This Appearing World "offers a vivid example of the concentration and stillness he would bring, an 'in-the-moment-ness' that had an almost 'prayer-like' reverence and sense of occasion."

In a review for Songlines, Seth Jordan remarked: "While it can't really be categorised as world music per se, any more than it can be called jazz or even contemporary classical, all three of those complementary genres are present in their most loosely defined sense. An album that is much more about sounds themselves, rather than any recognised melody or set structure, these at times challenging improvisations gestate, grow, meander, find small crevices to nest in, and then mutate into new haiku-like statements."

== Track listing ==
All compositions by Marilyn Crispell, Richard Nunns, and Jeff Henderson.

1. "Gentle Folk" – 3:39
2. "Snow Grind" – 2:47
3. "Missed Children" – 4:34
4. "Rumi Nation" – 4:02
5. "Paper Sand" – 3:05
6. "Here Seas Peak" – 2:11
7. "Tough Fairy, My Dear" – 4:57
8. "This Appearing World" – 3:46
9. "Meat Ox" – 2:22
10. "Trap" – 1:55
11. "Sine Language" – 1:02
12. "Isle And Light" – 1:18
13. "Quiet Night" – 5:01

== Personnel ==
- Marilyn Crispell – piano
- Richard Nunns – Taonga pūoro
- Jeff Henderson – reeds
