= Marilyn Crispell =

American jazz pianist and composer

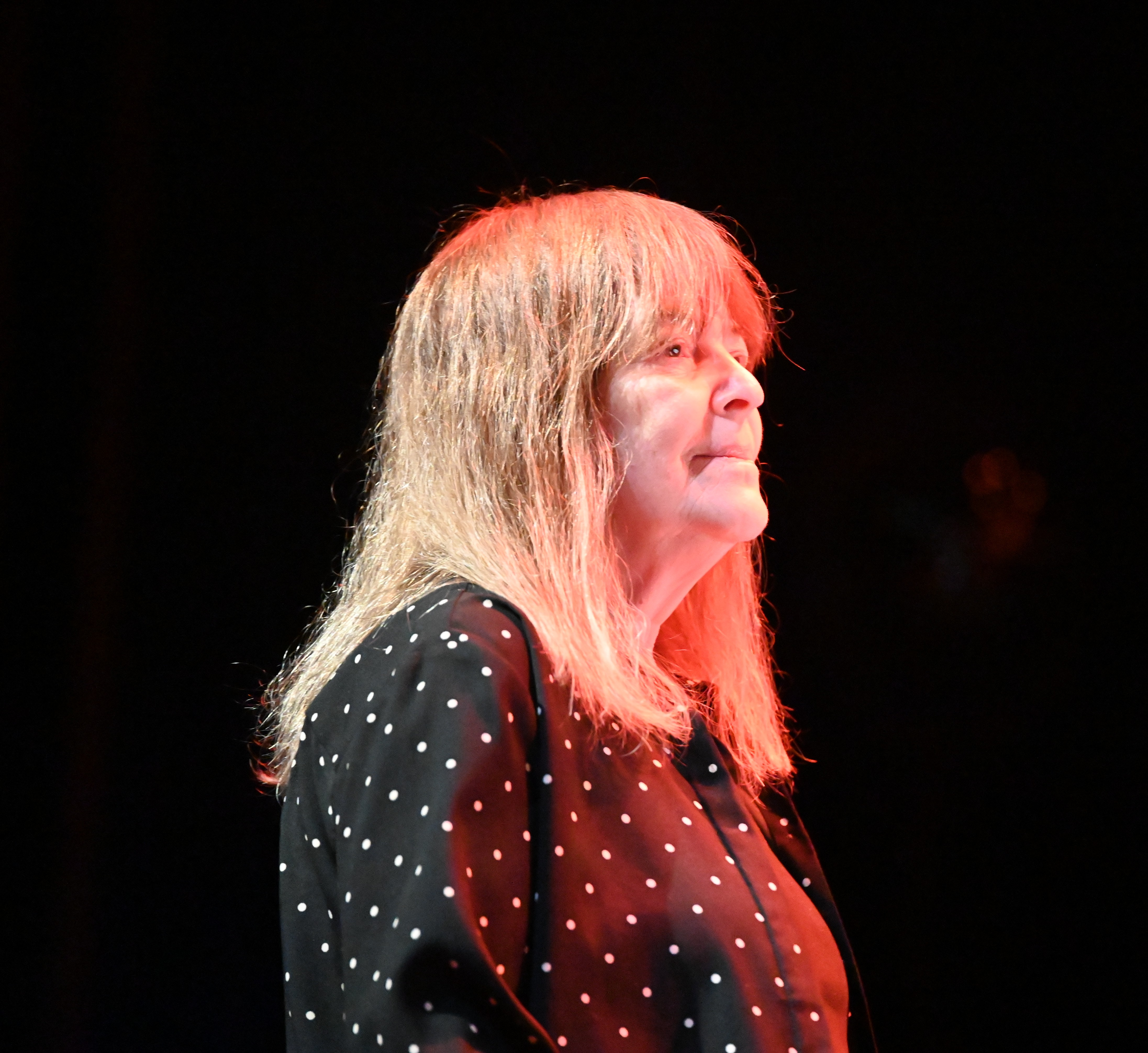
- Crispell in 2026

Background information
- Born: March 30, 1947 (age 79); Philadelphia, Pennsylvania, U.S.
- Genres: Jazz, classical
- Occupations: Musician, composer
- Instrument: Piano
- Years active: 1977–present
- Labels: Leo, Black Saint, Music & Arts, ECM
- Website: www.marilyncrispell.com

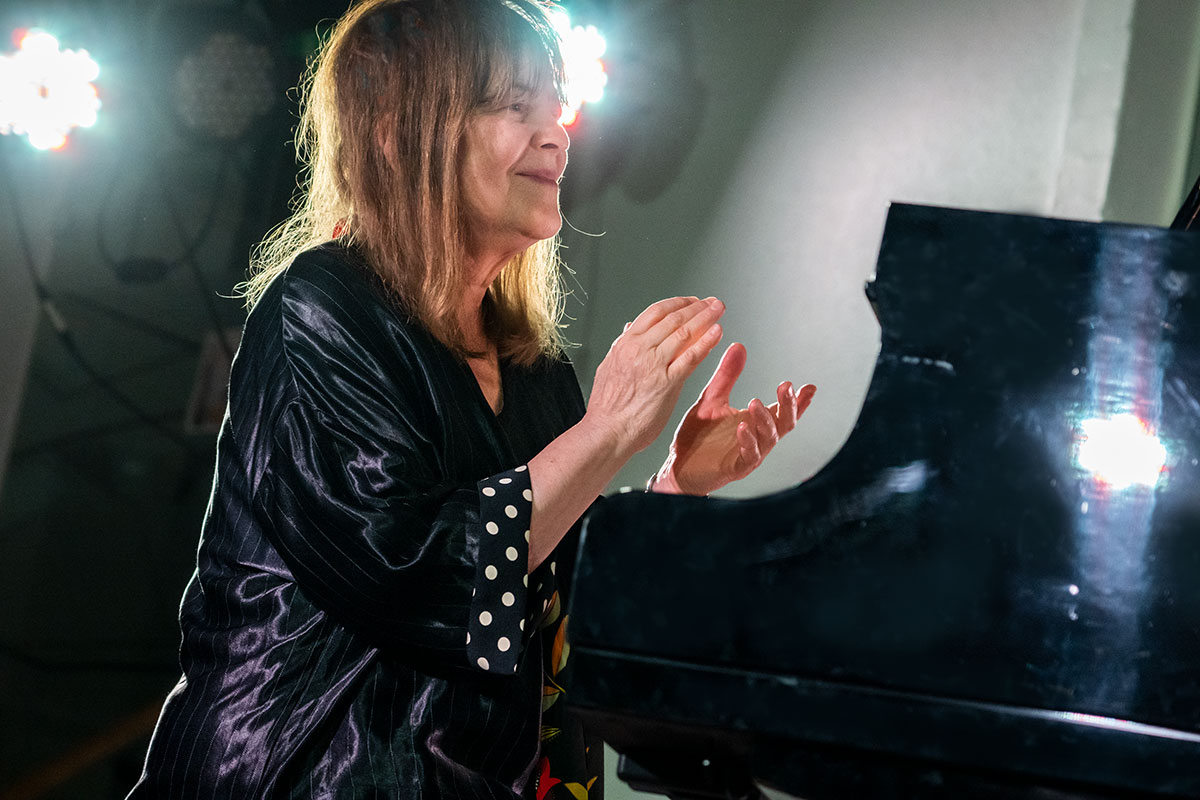
Aarhus, Denmark (2022 Photo Hreinn Gudlaugsson)

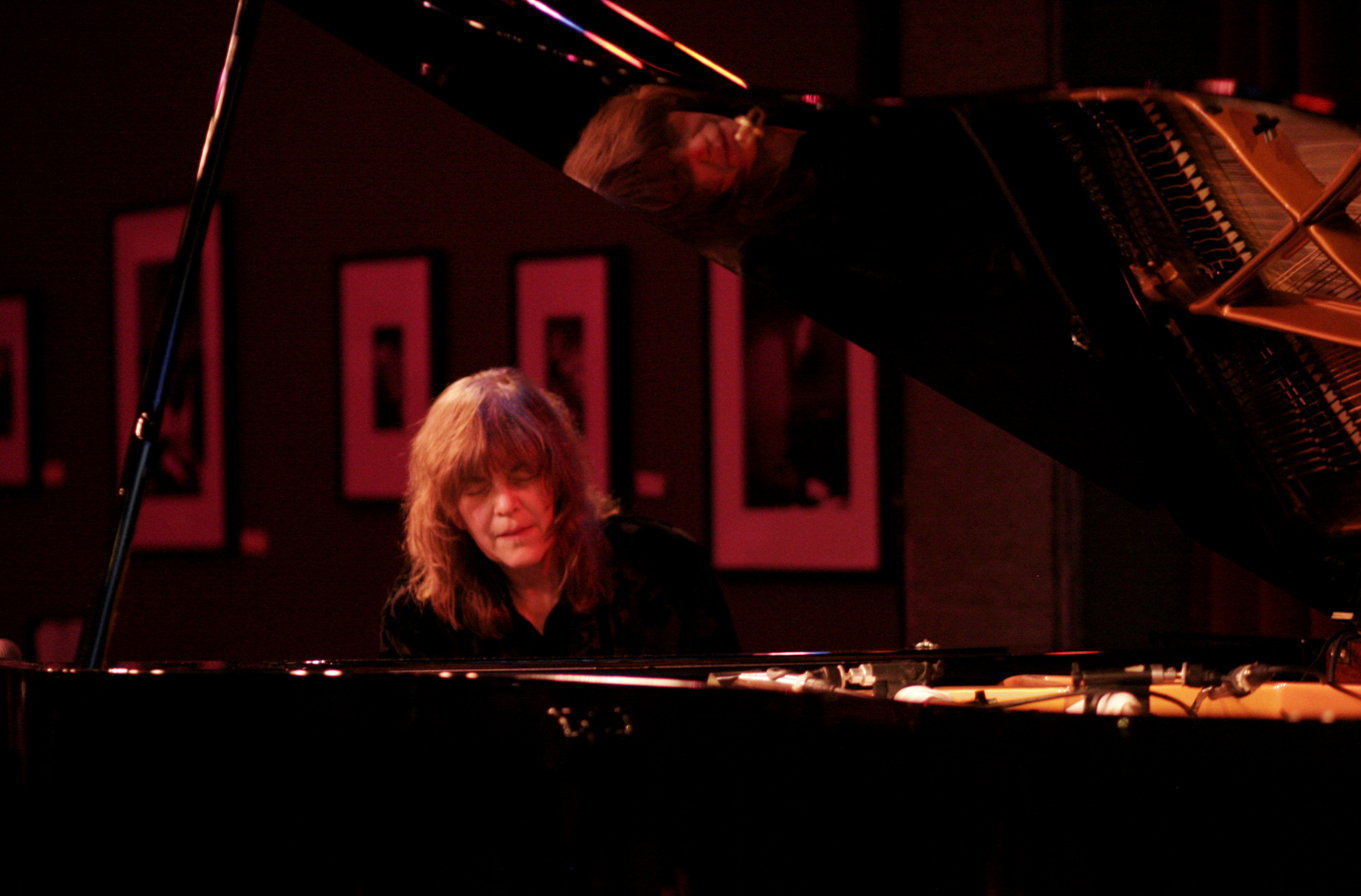
Crispell in concert, April 29, 2008

Marilyn Crispell (born March 30, 1947) is an American jazz pianist and composer. Scott Yanow described her as "a powerful player... who has her own way of using space... She is near the top of her field." Jon Pareles of The New York Times wrote: "Hearing Marilyn Crispell play solo piano is like monitoring an active volcano... She is one of a very few pianists who rise to the challenge of free jazz." In addition to her own extensive work as a soloist or bandleader, Crispell is known as a longtime member of saxophonist Anthony Braxton's quartet in the 1980s and '90s.

== Biography ==
Crispell was born in Philadelphia and, at the age of ten, moved to Baltimore, where she attended Western High School. She studied classical piano at the Peabody Conservatory beginning at age seven, and also began improvising at an early age, thanks to a teacher who required all her students to improvise regardless of their skill level. She later attended the New England Conservatory of Music, where she studied piano and composition, graduating in 1968. Crispell was not interested in jazz until 1975, when, while living on Cape Cod, she heard John Coltrane's A Love Supreme for the first time. She recalls: "The emotional and spiritual quality of it overpowered me... I can honestly say it's possibly the most overpowering experience I've ever had in my life. That one night of listening to A Love Supreme over and over and over just completely changed my life."

Crispell soon returned to Boston, where she studied jazz privately with Charlie Banacos for two years. According to Crispell, "I had to, like, really go from scratch. I had to do everything in twelve keys. I had to write out seven solos in every key on every piece. I had to listen to tons of stuff and transcribe it to be able to hear and understand what was happening, you know, within the confines of these time cycles and chord changes. How were people using the chords and the notes and the chords and the scales? Where did they go outside of them?"

While in Boston, she met saxophonist Charlie Mariano, who suggested she consider attending sessions at the Creative Music Studio in Woodstock, NY, founded by Karl Berger, Ingrid Sertso, and Ornette Coleman. In 1977, she visited the studio for a summer, and came into contact with musicians such as Cecil Taylor, Don Cherry, Roscoe Mitchell, Wadada Leo Smith, Anthony Davis, and Oliver Lake. Regarding her first encounter with Taylor, she recalled: "I remember the day I first met Cecil Taylor... He was playing pool, and there was a piano behind the pool room. So I sat at the piano and gave him an impromptu concert, hoping he'd listen. When I was finished he kissed my hand, and said, 'This lady can play!' I'm still flattered to hear my name mentioned in the same breath." (During this time, people frequently referred to her as "the female Cecil Taylor" due to her fiery approach to the piano and her tendency to play "lots of notes, all of the time. Continuously, without much of a break.") Regarding her time at the Creative Music Studio, she stated: "It was and is a unique place in the world for the kind of music that we do... If it had taken place in New York City I don't think the feeling would have been the same. Here you were living and eating and hanging out with the guiding artists in this country motel setting. People would be up all night making bonfires and playing outside on the lawn with musicians from all over the world. It was a very important human experience and I met many of the people I ended up playing with." Upon completion of the session, Crispell quickly moved to Woodstock and has resided there ever since.

While at the Creative Music Studio, Crispell also met Anthony Braxton, who invited her to sit in with his group. She recalls: "At our first gig Anthony placed a beer in my hand and said, 'Relax, don't play so many notes.' I was playing like a thousand notes a minute, and he was the first person to make me think of space and breath and phrasing, as opposed to a constant barrage." She was soon invited to join Braxton's Creative Music Orchestra and his quartet, of which she was a member from 1983 to 1995, and which also featured bassist Mark Dresser, and drummer Gerry Hemingway. During this time, she made roughly a dozen recordings with Braxton, and also began releasing recordings under her own name. Regarding her tenure with the group, she stated: "[I]t was like a family. Playing with Anthony really taught me a lot about space, the use of space and silence and breath, and the use of composition in improvisation... Just being inside his compositions taught me a lot about composition... What really impressed me is that he was composing in a way that was very similar to contemporary classical musicians but with a lot more freedom, allowing interpretation.". Since then, silence and space have become known as a central part of her recordings. As she noted in an interview with PostGenre, Marilyn noted, "[W]hen I first started playing creative music, I don’t think I left much of any silence in my performances. I was focused heavily on playing into the energy and showing what I could do. That kind of thinking is very far away from my mindset now."

During the late 1970s and 1980s, she also worked and recorded with Reggie Workman, Roscoe Mitchell, Wadada Leo Smith, the Barry Guy New Orchestra, the European Quartet Noir (with Urs Leimgruber, Fritz Hauser, and Joëlle Léandre), and Babatunde Olatunji. In 1981 she performed at the Woodstock Jazz Festival, held in celebration of the tenth anniversary of the Creative Music Studio.

In the early 1990s, her style began to evolve further when she visited Stockholm, where she heard a Swedish group that included bassist Anders Jormin. She recalls: "It just touched a nerve in me... it unlocked the door to the lyrical things that I would have liked to be doing and wasn't doing." "Some of this kind of beauty and Nordic sound and tenderness opened up something in me that I had really kept hidden because I was trying to be really strong all the time. Even when I played romantic things I played them with a lot of energy. So suddenly this other sound entered into my consciousness and it resonated with something in me that I had not allowed to be expressed." She soon performed and recorded with Jormin and his Bortom Quintet. In 1996, she recorded Nothing Ever Was, Anyway: Music of Annette Peacock with Gary Peacock, Paul Motian, and Annette Peacock, her first album for ECM. Regarding her ECM recordings, she stated: "A lot of the stuff I have been doing with ECM is more about an inner intensity rather than an outer one. I feel there is a connection between the two states - wild energy and extreme introversion - two sides of the same coin. I do both and feel like there is an organic connection between them - an integration between them. With the ECM recordings, I like the idea of playing things so slowly that you are almost suspended in time."

Crispell has continued to perform and record extensively as a soloist and leader of her own groups, as well as with the Evan Parker Trio, an all-female trio led by Denmark's Lotte Anker, Tisziji Munoz, Ivo Perelman, Scott Fields, the Copenhagen Art Ensemble, Trio Tapestry with saxophonist Joe Lovano and drummer Carmen Castaldi, Trio 3 (Reggie Workman, Oliver Lake, Andrew Cyrille), the Dave Douglas Trio, Tyshawn Sorey, and many other musicians. She has also performed and recorded music by contemporary composers such as John Cage, Pauline Oliveros, Robert Cogan, Pozzi Escot, Manfred Niehaus, and Anthony Davis (including his opera X, The Life and Times of Malcolm X with the New York City Opera).

She has taught improvisation workshops and given lecture/demonstrations across the world and has collaborated with poets, dancers, filmmakers, and videographers. She has been the recipient of a Guggenheim Fellowship in Music Composition (2005–2006), a Mary Flagler Cary Charitable Trust composition commission (1988–1989), and three New York Foundation for the Arts fellowship grants (1988–1989, 1994-1995 and 2006–2007). In 1996, Crispell was presented with an Outstanding Alumni Award by the New England Conservatory, and in 2004, was named as being one of their 100 most outstanding alumni of the past 100 years. She is the author of the instructional DVD "A pianist's guide to free improvisation: keys to unlocking your creativity" (2002, Homespun Video).

In 2000, Crispell appeared in the French film Women in Jazz by Gilles Corre. In 2005–2006, she performed and recorded with the NOW Orchestra in Vancouver, and was co-director of the Vancouver Creative Music Institute and a faculty member at the Banff Centre International Workshop in Jazz. She also created and directed a multi media production entitled Cy Twombly Dreamhouse, with choreography by Savia Berger. In 2017, she collaborated with Jo Ganter, visual artist, and Raymond MacDonald, saxophonist, both from Scotland, on Drawing Sound, an exhibition of graphic scores at the Kleinert/James Gallery, Woodstock, NY.

Crispell was awarded an NEA Jazz Masters Fellowship, America’s highest honor in jazz, in 2025.

== Discography ==
=== As leader/co-leader ===
Year recorded	Year released	Title	Label	Notes
1981–82	1983	Spirit Music	Cadence	Quartet, with Billy Bang (violin), Wes Brown (guitar), John Betsch (drums); in concert
1982	1984	Live in Berlin	Black Saint	Quartet, with Billy Bang (violin), Peter Kowald (bass), John Betsch (drums)
1983	1983	A Concert in Berlin – Summer 83	FMP	Solo piano
1983	1983	Rhythms Hung in Undrawn Sky	Leo	Solo piano
1985	1985	And Your Ivory Voice Sings	Leo	Duo, with Doug James (percussion)
1986	1987	Quartet Improvisations, Paris 1986	Leo	Quartet, with Didier Petit (cello), Marcio Mattos (bass), Yoval Mincemacher (drums)
1987	1988	Labyrinths	Victo	Solo piano
1987	1993	For Coltrane	Leo	Solo piano; in concert
1987	1988	Gaia	Leo	Trio, with Reggie Workman (bass, drums, percussion), Doug James (drums, percussion)
1989	1991	The Kitchen Concert	Leo	Trio, with Mark Dresser (bass), Gerry Hemingway (drums)
1989	1992	Duo	Knitting Factory	Duo, with Gerry Hemingway (drums)
1989	1990	Live in San Francisco	Music & Arts	Solo piano; in concert
1989	1990	Duets Vancouver 1989	Music & Arts	Duo, with Anthony Braxton (alto sax, flute); in concert
1989	1990	Live in Zurich	Leo	Trio, with Reggie Workman (bass), Paul Motian (drums); in concert
1990	1991	Circles	Victo	Quintet, with Oliver Lake (soprano sax, alto sax), Peter Buettner (tenor sax), Reggie Workman (bass), Gerry Hemingway (drums); in concert
1990	1991	Overlapping Hands: Eight Segments	FMP	Duo, with Irene Schweizer (piano)
1991	1992	Piano Duets (Tuned & Detuned Pianos)	Leo	Duo, with Georg Graewe (piano)
1991–92	1993	Highlights from the Summer of 1992 American Tour	Music & Arts	Trio, with Reggie Workman (bass), Gerry Hemingway (drums)
1992	1995	Inference	Music & Arts	Duo, with Tim Berne (alto sax); in concert
1992	1995	Hyperion	Music & Arts	Trio, with Peter Brötzmann (saxophones, clarinets, tarogato), Hamid Drake (drums); in concert
1993	1993	Santuerio	Leo	Quartet, with Mark Feldman (violin), Hank Roberts (cello), and Gerry Hemingway (drums)
1993	1995	Cascades	Music & Arts	Trio, with Barry Guy (bass), Gerry Hemingway (drums, vibraphone, gamelan); in concert
1994	1996	Destiny	Okka Disk	Trio, with Fred Anderson (tenor sax), Hamid Drake (percussion); in concert
1994	1995	Spring Tour	Alice	Trio, with Anders Jormin (bass), Raymond Strid (drums)
1994	1994	Band on the Wall	Matchless	Duo, with Eddie Prévost (drums); in concert
1994	1995	Behind the Night	B&W Music, X-Talk	Quintet, with Fritz Hauser, Hildegard Kleeb, Urs Leimgruber, and Elvira Plenar
1995	1996	Contrasts: Live at Yoshi's (1995)	Music & Arts	Solo piano; in concert
1995	1995	Live at Mills College, 1995	Music & Arts	Solo piano; in concert
1995	1996	The Woodstock Concert	Music & Arts	Solo piano; in concert
1995	1998	Dark Night, and Luminous	Edicions Nova Era	Duo with Agustí Fernández (piano); in concert
1996	1996	Connecting Spirits	Music & Arts	Duo, with Joseph Jarman (alto sax, flute); in concert
1996	1998	Nothing Ever Was, Anyway: Music of Annette Peacock	ECM	Most tracks trio, with Gary Peacock (bass), Paul Motian (drums); one track quartet, with Annette Peacock (vocals) added
1999	2000	Red	Black Saint	Duo, with Stefano Maltese (reeds)
1999	2001	Blue	Black Saint	Most tracks duo, with Stefano Maltese (reeds); some tracks trio, with Gioconda Cilio (vocals) added
2000	2001	Amaryllis	ECM	Trio, with Gary Peacock (bass), Paul Motian (drums)
2000	2001	Complicité	Victo	A 3-disc set. Crispell plays solo piano on one disc; the other two discs feature Paul Plimley / John Oswald and Cecil Taylor.
2003	2004	Storyteller	ECM	Trio, with Mark Helias (bass), Paul Motian (drums)
2004–07	2009	Collaborations	Leo	Various ensembles; with Magnus Broo (trumpet), Palle Danielsson (bass), Fredrik Ljungkvist (clarinet and saxophone), Paal Nilssen-Love (drums), Lars-Goran Ulander (saxophone), Per Zanussi (bass)
2007	2007	Vignettes	ECM	Solo piano
2007	2008	Sibanye (We Are One)	Intakt	Duo, with Louis Moholo-Moholo (drums, percussion)
2008	2010	One Dark Night I Left My Silent House	ECM	Duo, with David Rothenberg
2008	2011	This Appearing World	Rattle Records	Trio, with Jeff Henderson (reeds) and Richard Nunns (Taonga pūoro)
2009–10	2011	Affinities	Intakt	Duo, with Gerry Hemingway (drums, percussion, vibraphone)
2010	2011	Free Flight: Live at Enjoy Jazz Festival 2010	fixcel (Release with limited circulation)	Trio, with Erwin Ditzner and Sebastian Gramss
2011	2013	Azure	ECM	Duo, with Gary Peacock
2011	2012	Play Braxton	Tzadik	Trio, with Mark Dresser and Gerry Hemingway
2012	2021	ConcertOto	Matchless	Trio, with Eddie Prévost and Harrison Smith
2013	2015	Table of Changes	Intakt	Duo, with Gerry Hemingway (drums)
2014	2016	In Motion	Intakt	Trio, with Gary Peacock (bass), Richard Poole (drums)
2018	2018	Dreamstruck	Not Two	Trio, with Joe Fonda (bass), Harvey Sorgen (drums)
2018	2018	Dream Libretto	Leo	Most tracks duo, with Tanya Kalmanovitch (violin); some tracks trio, with Richard Teitelbaum (electronics) added
2018	2019	The Adornment of Time	Pi	Duo, with Tyshawn Sorey (drums, percussion)
2018–19	2021	Streams	Not Two	Duo, with Yuma Uesaka (saxophone, clarinet)
2019	2020	How to Turn the Moon	Pyroclastic	Duo, with Angelica Sanchez
2021	2022	With Grace in Mind	Fundacja Sluchaj!	Trio, with Joe Fonda (bass), Harvey Sorgen (drums)
2023	2024	Spi-raling Horn	Balance Point Acoustics	Quartet, with Jason Stein (bass clarinet), Damon Smith (bass), Adam Shead (drums)

==== Compilations ====
Year recorded	Year released	Title	Label	Notes
1983-86	2001	Selected Works 1983-1986 (Solo, Duo, Quartet)	Golden Years Of New Jazz	Compilation of tracks previously released on Rhythms Hung In Undrawn Sky, And Your Ivory Voice Sings, and Quartet Improvisations, Paris 1986

=== As side musician ===
with Lotte Anker and Marilyn Mazur

- Poetic Justice (Dacapo, 2001)

with Clint Bahr

- Puzzlebox (Moonjune, 2022)

with Thurman Barker

- The Way I Hear It (Uptee Productions, 1998)

with Anthony Braxton

- Composition 98 (hatART, 1981)
- Six Compositions (Quartet) 1984 (Black Saint, 1985)
- Quartet (London) 1985 (Leo, 1985 [1988])
- Prag 1984 (Quartet Performance) (Sound Aspects, 1984 [1990])
- Quartet (Birmingham) 1985 (Leo, 1985 [1991])
- Willisau (Quartet) 1991 (hatART, 1991)
- Quartet (Coventry) 1985 (Leo, 1985 [1993])
- (Victoriaville) 1992 (Victo, 1993)
- Twelve Compositions: Recorded Live in July 1993 at Yoshi's in Oakland California (Music & Arts, 1994)
- Creative Orchestra (Köln) 1978 (hatART, 1978 [1995])
- Quartet (Santa Cruz) 1993 (hatART, 1993 [1997])
- The Coventry Concert (Bootleg / Unauthorized, 2006)
- Orchestra (Paris) 1978 (Bootleg / Unauthorized, 2011)
- Quartet (New York) 1993 - Set 1 (Bootleg / Unauthorized, 2011)
- Quartet (New York) 1993 - Set 2 (Bootleg / Unauthorized, 2011)
- The Complete Remastered Recordings on Black Saint & Soul Note (C.A.M. Jazz, 2011)
- Quartet (Karlsruhe) 1983 (live, archival) (New Braxton House, 2012)
- Quartet (Mulhouse) 1983 (live, archival) (New Braxton House, 2012)
- CMS Archive Selections, Volume 2 (Planet Arts, 2015)

with Andrea Centazzo

- Stolen Moment (Ictus, 2020)

with Agustí Fernández

- River Tiger Fire (Fundacja Słuchaj!, 2015)

with Scott Fields

- 48 Motives, January 11, 1996 (Cadence, 1996)
- Five Frozen Eggs (Music & Arts, 1997)
- Stephen Dembski – Sonotropism (Music & Arts, 1997)

with John Geggie and Nick Fraser

- Geggie Project (Ambiances Magnétiques, 2008)

with The Glasgow Improvisers Orchestra and Evan Parker

- Parallel Moments Unbroken (FMR, 2018)

with Barry Guy

- Blue Horizon. Barry Guy@70 [Live At The Ad Libitum Festival 2017] (Fundacja Słuchaj!, 2018)

with Barry Guy London Jazz Composer's Orchestra

- Three Pieces for Orchestra (Intakt, 1997)
- Double Trouble Two (Intakt, 1998)

with Barry Guy New Orchestra

- Inscape–Tableaux (Intakt, 2001)

with Guy-Gustafsson-Strid Trio

- Gryffgryffgryffs: The 1996 Radio Sweden Concert (live) (Music & Arts, 1997)

with Barry Guy and Paul Lytton

- Odyssey (Intakt, 2001)
- Ithaca (Intakt, 2004)
- Phases of the Night (Intakt, 2008)
- Deep Memory (Intakt, 2016)

with Francois Houle

- Any Terrain Tumultuous (Red Toucan, 1995)

with Anders Jormin

- In Winds, In Light (ECM, 2004)

with Henry Kaiser

- Eternity Blue (Shanachie, 1995)

with Steve Lacy

- Five Facings (FMP, 1996)

with Joelle Leandre

- Joëlle Léandre Project (Leo, 2000)
- Stone Quartet: DMG @ The Stone Volume 1: December 22, 2006 (DMG/ARC, 2008)
- Stone Quartet: Live at Vision Festival (Ayler, 2011)

with Urs Leimgruber, Joelle Leandre and Fritz Hauser

- Quartet Noir (Victo, 1999)
- Quartet Noir Lugano (Victo, 2005)

with Joe Lovano

- Trio Tapestry (ECM, 2019)
- Garden of Expression (ECM, 2021)
- Our Daily Bread (ECM, 2023)

with Raymond MacDonald

- Parallel Moments (Babel, 2014)
- Songs Along the Way (Babel, 2018)

with Raymond MacDonald and Pierre Alexandre Tremblay

- Two Duos : Three Trios (Bruce's Fingers, 2016)

with The Roscoe Mitchell Creative Orchestra

- Sketches from Bamboo (Moers, 1979)

with Michael Moore and Gerry Hemingway

- MGM Trio (Ramboy, 1996)

with Tisziji Munoz

- Auspicious Healing! (Anami, 2000)
- Breaking the Wheel of Life and Death (Anami, 2000)
- Heart to Heart (Anami, 2013)
- Beautiful Empty Fullness (Anami, 2014)
- The Paradox of Independence (Anami, 2014)

with NOW Orchestra

- Pola (Victo, 2005)

with Larry Ochs

- The Secret Magritte (Black Saint, 1996)

with Parker-Guy-Lytton Trio

- Natives and Aliens (Leo, 1997)
- After Appleby (Leo, 2000)

with Ivo Perelman

- En Adir (Music & Arts, 1997)
- Sound Hierarchy (Music & Arts, 1997)
- Brass and Ivory Tales (Fundacja Słuchaj!, 2021)

with Nelly Pouget

- Le Voir (Minuit 5 Regards, 1998)

with Michele Rabbia and Vincent Courtois

- Shifting Grace (CAM Jazz, 2006)

with Gunhild Seim and David Rothenberg

- Grenseland (Drollehala, 2018)

with Gunhild Seim & Time Jungle

- Elephant Wings (Drollehala, 2012)

with Wadada Leo Smith

- Budding of a Rose (Moers, 1979)

with Reggie Workman

- Synthesis (Leo, 1986)
- Images (Music & Arts, 1990)
- Altered Spaces (Leo, 1993)

with Bobby Zankel

- Human Flowers (CIMP, 1996)

performing works of John Cage

- Works for Piano, Toy Piano & Prepared Piano, Vol. III (Wergo, 1991)

performing works of Robert Cogan, Pozzi Escot and Manfred Niehaus

- Stellar Pulsations / Three Composers (Leo, 1994)

== Filmography ==
- "Rising Tones Cross" (1985) dir. Ebba Jahn
- Femmes du Jazz / Women in Jazz (2000) by Gilles Corre
- The Songpoet (2019) by Paul Lamont
- Motian in Motion (2020) by Michael Patrick Kelly
- ECM50 | 2000 - Marilyn Crispell (episode in a series of 51 short films on ECM, 2020) by IJ.Biermann

== Additional sources ==
- Crispell, Marilyn. 2000. "Elements of Improvisation: For Cecil Taylor and Anthony Braxton." In Arcana: Musicians on Music, ed. John Zorn, 190–192. New York: Granary Books/Hips Road.
