= For Coltrane =

Live album by Marilyn Crispell
- Released: 1993
- Recorded: July 10, 1987
- Venue: Logan Hall, London
- Genre: Free Jazz
- Label: Leo Records; CD LR 195
- Producer: Leo Feigin

For Coltrane is a live solo piano album by Marilyn Crispell. It was recorded at Logan Hall in London in July 1987, and was released in 1993 by Leo Records. The recording took place during a concert in which Crispell supported Alice Coltrane and her sons Ravi and Oran with a set dedicated to Alice's late husband.

In the album liner notes, Crispell wrote: "I was listening to A Love Supreme one night and it changed my life. I decided to get back into music and I had this mystical experience where I felt the presence and guiding of Coltrane's spirit in the room. I asked for his help and I know he gave it to me because I could feel him there and because right afterwards everything in my life went so suddenly and strongly in the right direction..."

== Reception ==
Professional ratings
Review scores
Source	Rating
AllMusic	4/5 stars
The Penguin Guide to Jazz	4/4 stars
Tom Hull – on the Web	B+

The authors of the Penguin Guide to Jazz Recordings awarded the album 4 stars, and stated: "Solo performances by Crispell are dramatic, harmonically tense and wholly absorbing... Opening with a torrid 'Dear Lord' and closing with the billowing 'After the Rain', she improvised a series of 'collages' in memory of the great saxophonist. She also performed a piece called 'Coltrane Time', a title of convenience for a sequence of rhythmic cells on which the saxophonist had been experimenting in the period immediately before his death. A beautiful record."

== Track listing ==
1. "Dear Lord" (John Coltrane) – 7:09
2. "Collage for Coltrane I" (Crispell) – 5:46
3. "Collage for Coltrane II" (Crispell) – 5:35
4. "Collage for Coltrane III" (Crispell) – 4:27
5. "Lazy Bird" (John Coltrane) – 3:55
6. "Coltrane Time" (John Coltrane) – 5:31
7. "After the Rain" (John Coltrane) – 11:52

== Personnel ==
- Marilyn Crispell – piano
