= Tim Cobb =

American double bassist

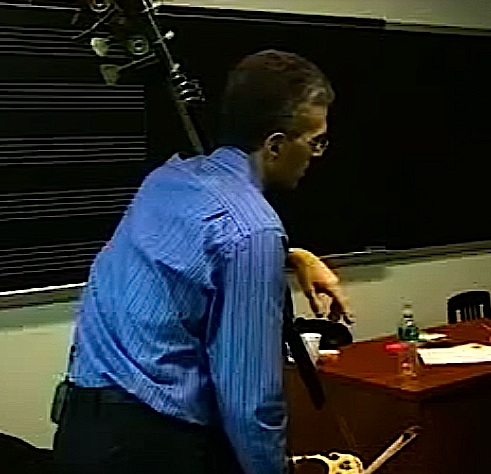
- Timothy Cobb, c. 2007

Background information
- Born: March 28, 1964 (age 62); Albany, New York, U.S.
- Occupations: Musician, educator
- Instrument: Double bass
- Label: Music & Arts

Timothy Cobb (born March 28, 1964, in Albany, New York) is the American current principal double bassist with the New York Philharmonic. He previously taught at the Peabody Institute of Music, and joined the Manhattan School of Music faculty in 1992. Cobb also currently teaches at SUNY Purchase, Lynn University, Rutgers University: Mason Gross School of the Arts, YOA Orchestra of the Americas, and Mannes School of Music Preparatory Division. He is the current chair of the double-bass department at the Juilliard School, where he has been on faculty since 2002.

== Performance career ==
A native of Albany, New York, Cobb began playing the bass at the age of seven, studying with his father David Cobb, and playing professionally by thirteen. He attended the Curtis Institute of Music, where he was awarded the sole position available for bass in the year of his application to study with Roger Scott.

In 1982 and 1983, Cobb was a member of the New York String Orchestra Seminar under Alexander Schneider. While at Curtis, Cobb substituted regularly in the Philadelphia Orchestra. In the fall of his senior year he became a member of the Chicago Symphony Orchestra under Sir Georg Solti. Appointed associate principal bass of the Metropolitan Opera Orchestra in 1986, Cobb was granted a leave of absence by Solti to perform with the Metropolitan Opera, where he elected to stay. He was appointed principal bass several years later, after the departure of Laurence Glazener in 2004. As a member of the Met Orchestra, he has toured with the entire company and with the orchestra on the symphonic stage, led by Maestro James Levine. He has also enjoyed frequent collaborations with Maestro Levine in the chamber setting performing works such as Schubert's "Trout" Quintet and Stravinsky's L'Histoire du soldat. Maestro Levine has created a series at Weill Hall in New York to showcase the chamber abilities within his orchestra, a series where Cobb has made regular appearances. Cobb can be heard on all Met recordings since 1985.

Cobb has had invitations to perform in the World Orchestra for Peace created by Solti (subsequently led by Maestro Valery Gergiev), and in Japan as principal bass of the new "super orchestra," a gathering of musicians from major orchestras around the world. He was appointed principal bass of the New York Philharmonic in May of 2014. He is solo bassist for the Harmonie Ensemble, a New York–based woodwind ensemble, as well as the solo bassist for the St. Barth's International Music Festival, St. Barthelemy, French West Indies, where he performs for a week in January each year. He appeared in Ainay-le-Vieil, France, performing with the American Chamber Ensemble, and has also performed at Bargemusic, the Bridgehampton Festival, Caramoor, the Boston Chamber Music Society, the Lyric Chamber Music Society, the New Jersey Chamber Music Society, Mostly Mozart, La Musica Festival, the Sarasota Music Festival, the Great Performers at Lincoln Center series, and the Chamber Music Society of Lincoln Center. For three years, Cobb was the solo bassist for the Marlboro Music Festival and has toured with Musicians from Marlboro. Cobb has also collaborated with the Emerson Quartet, the Guarneri Quartet, the Moscow and St. Lawrence Quartets, and the Eroica Trio.

Cobb has recorded for Deutsche Grammophon, Decca, Sony, and Music & Arts labels. He is active as a studio musician in New York, recording numerous soundtracks for movies, television, songs, and advertisements featured nationally and internationally.

Each December, Cobb has been coaching the bass of the New York String Orchestra Seminar at Carnegie Hall. He participated in the recording of "Bottesini: Concerto for 2 Double Basses & Piano; Duet 2; Passioni Amorosi; Rossini Fantasia", released in September 2010. American Record Guide commended his performance, alongside another bass player on the record, Thomas Martin. The next June, he joined the Sarasota Music Festival to perform as well as to coach chamber music featuring the bass. In early 2000s, Cobb was invited to give a master class and recital at the Tokyo University of the Arts in Japan, San Francisco Conservatory of Music, and Northwestern University's School of Music. Cobb is part of the faculty of YOA Orchestra of the Americas.

In May 2014, Cobb has been named as the new principal bass at New York Philharmonic.

== Personal life ==
Cobb lives in New York City with his wife, daughter and son.

== Notable students ==
- John Grillo, member of the Pittsburgh Opera
- Scott Pingel, principal of the San Francisco Symphony
