= Gaia (Marilyn Crispell album) =

Studio album by Marilyn Crispell
- Released: 1988
- Recorded: March 15, 1987
- Studio: Woodstock studio, Woodstock, New York
- Genre: Jazz
- Length: 39:40
- Label: Leo
- Producer: Leo Feigin

Marilyn Crispell chronology
Quartet Improvisations, Paris 1986 (1987)	Gaia (1988)	Labyrinths (1988)

Gaia is an album by American jazz pianist Marilyn Crispell, which was recorded in 1987 and released on the English Leo label.

== Reception ==
Professional ratings
Review scores
Source	Rating
AllMusic	2/5 stars
The Penguin Guide to Jazz	4/4 stars
Tom Hull – on the Web	A−

The Wire's 1988 critics poll listed Gaia as one of the best albums of that year. The editors wrote: "Named for the Greek Goddess of the Earth, GAIA affirms the power of the life-force in fierce, joyous music that is both sexual and spiritual..."

In his review for AllMusic, Thom Jurek states "Gaia is too fragmented to be marketed as a single work, its editing is sloppy and incoherent, and the improvising here - by a trio that would later stun live audiences with its empathy and near telepathic communication - is too stilted and rudimentary."

The Penguin Guide to Jazz says that "Gaia is one of the finest composition/improvisation records of the '80s, a hymn to the planet that is neither mawkish nor sentimental, but tough-minded, coherent and entire."

== Track listing ==
All compositions by Marilyn Crispell

1. "Gaia" – 39:40

== Personnel ==
- Marilyn Crispell – piano, harp, percussion
- Reggie Workman - bass, drums, percussion
- Doug James - drums, percussion
