= Piano Duets (Tuned & Detuned Pianos) =

Live album by Marilyn Crispell and Georg Graewe
- Released: 1992
- Recorded: October 27 and December 19, 1991
- Venue: Ruhr Jazz Festival Bochum, Germany, and Ibach Piano Factory, Schwelm, Germany
- Genre: Free Jazz
- Label: Leo Records; CD LR 206/207
- Producer: Leo Feigin

Piano Duets (Tuned & Detuned Pianos) is a two-CD album by pianists Marilyn Crispell and Georg Graewe. Disc 1, titled Tuned Pianos, was recorded live at the Ruhr Jazz Festival Bochum in Germany in October 1991, while disc 2, titled Detuned Pianos, was recorded at the Ibach Piano Factory in Schwelm, Germany. The album was released in 1992 by Leo Records.

On disc 1, the pianos are tuned normally, while on disc 2, the pianos are tuned according to a "diagonal tuning" system designed by Thomas Henke, in which the pianos are tuned a quarter tone apart in their middle registers, with the upper and lower registers sharped and flattened, respectively.

== Reception ==
Professional ratings
Review scores
Source	Rating
AllMusic	3/5 stars
The Penguin Guide to Jazz	3.5/4 stars
Tom Hull – on the Web	A−
The Virgin Encyclopedia of Jazz	4/5 stars

In a review for AllMusic, Thom Jurek wrote: "These duets are investigations into sonorities and tonalities that are accomplished during the act of duet improvisation. There are textures and rhythms possible only when one pianist is experiencing directly the tonal possibilities and harmonic registers in the act of responding to them. On the 'tuned' set, there is so much of a musical meld, gentle competition, and sonic revelry, it's impossible to hear who is playing where... On... the 'detuned' set... no such thing is possible. Each musician is feeling his/her way through a new set of seemingly infinite tonal possibilities and equations that don't add up in the same manner... Pure musicality and instinct are the only components applicable with intense listening... What makes this recording so interesting to listen to is the 'how' in each player's vocabulary that makes it work... a one of a kind document of a nearly hidden moment in musical history."

The authors of the Penguin Guide to Jazz Recordings awarded the album 3½ stars, and stated: "The duos... are fascinating... [on] the second disc... [the pianos] sound alien and unfamiliar. The improvisations are understandably more textural than usual... it's a pity that Crispell hasn't had an opportunity to explore this line of inquiry more fully and in a purely solo context."

== Track listing ==
All compositions by Marilyn Crispell and Georg Graewe.

=== Disc 1 (Tuned Pianos) ===
1. "Roode Lion" – 16:53
2. "Reves D'Assadour" – 11:32
3. "Twin Dragons" – 7:12
4. "Squares, Domes & Cones" – 9:04
5. "Fervent Void" – 11:50

=== Disc 2 (Detuned Pianos) ===
1. "If She Be A Wall" – 7:27
2. "Grey Chair & Parrots" – 5:56
3. "Denis D'Or" – 7:49
4. "Untitled Swirl" – 9:07
5. "Interior A" – 7:08
6. "Fringe" – 4:10
7. "Stairway To Nowhere" – 8:35
8. "Interior B" – 6:10

== Personnel ==
- Marilyn Crispell – piano
- Georg Graewe – piano
