= Quartet (London) 1985 =

Live album by Anthony Braxton
- Released: 1988
- Recorded: November 13, 1985
- Venue: Bloomsbury Theatre, London, England
- Genre: Jazz
- Length: 141:39
- Label: Leo; LR 414/415/416
- Producer: Leo Feigin

Anthony Braxton chronology
| Seven Standards (1985) | Quartet (London) 1985 (1988) | Quartet (Birmingham) 1985 (1985) |

CD Reissue Cover

Quartet (London) 1985 is a live album by composer and saxophonist Anthony Braxton recorded in England by BBC Radio 3 in 1985 and first released on the Leo label as a limited edition 3LP Box Set in 1988 before being released as a double CD in 1990.

== Reception ==
Professional ratings
Review scores
| Source | Rating |
|---|---|
| Allmusic | 3/5 stars |
| The Penguin Guide to Jazz Recordings | 3.5/4 stars |

The Allmusic review by Stewart Mason stated "the resulting music is completely fascinating".

== Track listing ==
All compositions by Anthony Braxton.

Disc one

1. First set - 56:10
  1. "Composition 122 (+ 108 A)"
  2. "Composition 40 (O)"
  3. "Collage Form Structure"
  4. "Composition 52"
  5. "Composition 86 (+ 32 + 96)"
  6. "Piano Solo from Composition 30"
  7. "Composition 115"

Disc two

1. Second set - 65:30
  1. "Composition 105 A"
  2. "Percussion Solo from Composition 96"
  3. "Composition 40 F"
  4. "Composition 121"
  5. "Composition 116"

== Personnel ==
- Anthony Braxton – clarinet, flute, alto saxophone, C melody saxophone, sopranino saxophone
- Marilyn Crispell – piano
- Mark Dresser – bass
- Gerry Hemingway – drums
