= François Houle =

- Born: August 17, 1961 (age 64); Lachine, Quebec
- Genres: Jazz
- Instruments: Saxophone, clarinet

François Houle (born August 17, 1961) is a Canadian jazz musician. He was born in Lachine, Quebec, and plays primarily clarinet.

Houle studied music formally at McGill University from 1980 to 1984 and then at Yale University from 1985 to 1987, after which he pursued a career in jazz, studying under Steve Lacy. He lived in Vancouver, British Columbia from 1990. His album for Songlines Records, In the Vernacular: The Music of John Carter, was nominated for a Juno Award in 1999 for Best Contemporary Jazz Album.

== Discography ==
=== As leader ===
- Hacienda (Songlines, 1992)
- Schizosphere (Red Toucan, 1994)
- Any Terrain Tumultuous with Marilyn Crispell (Red Toucan, 1995)
- Nancali with Benoit Delbecq (Songlines, 1997)
- In the Vernacular (Songlines, 1998)
- Au Coeur Du Litige (Spool, 2000)
- Cryptology (Between the Lines, 2000)
- Dice Thrown with Benoit Delbecq (Songlines, 2002)
- Double Entendre (Earsay, 2005)
- Aerials (Drip Audio, 2006)
- La Lumiere de Pierres with Evan Parker & Benoit Delbecq (Psi, 2007)
- 9 Moments with Joelle Leandre (Red Toucan, 2007)
- Because She Hoped with Benoit Delbecq (Songlines, 2011)
- Genera (Songlines, 2012)
- Aves with Havard Wiik (Songlines, 2013)
- Sassicaia with Sea and Sky (Redshift, 2014)
- Zarabandeo with Sea and Sky (Afterday Audio, 2015)
- 14 Rue Paul Fort Paris with Joelle Leandre (Leo, 2015)
- You Have Options with Alexander Hawkins (Songlines, 2018)

=== As sideman ===
With Joelle Leandre

- Live @ Banlieues Bleues (Red Toucan, 1996)
- C'Est Ca (Red Toucan, 2001)
- Last Seen Headed: Live at Sons D'Hiver (Ayler, 2010)

With others

- Randy Bachman, Jazz Thing (Ranbach Music/Maximum Jazz 2004)
- Benoit Delbecq, Pursuit (Songlines, 2000)
- Paul Dolden, L'Ivresse de La Vitesse (Empreintes DIGITALes, 1994)
- Paul Dolden, Seuil de Silences (Empreintes DIGITALes, 2003)
- Scott Fields, Hornets Collage (Nuscope, 2000)
- Scott Fields, 96 Gestures (CRI, 2001)
- Jerry Granelli, Sandhills Reunion (Songlines, 2004)
- Guillermo Gregorio, Faktura (hat[now]ART, 2002)
- Eyvind Kang, Pieces of Time (Spool, 1999)
- Robert Marcel Lepage, Pee Wee et Moi (Ambiances Magnetiques, 2005)
- Samo Salamon, Unobservable Mysteries (Afterday Records, 2021)
- Ana Sokolovic & Julia Wolfe, Thirst (Redshift, 2015)
- Yitzhak Yedid, Myth of the Cave (Between the Lines, 2003)
- Yitzhak Yedid, Reflections Upon Six Images (Between the Lines, 2006)
