= Gunhild Seim =

Norwegian jazz musician and composer (born 1973)

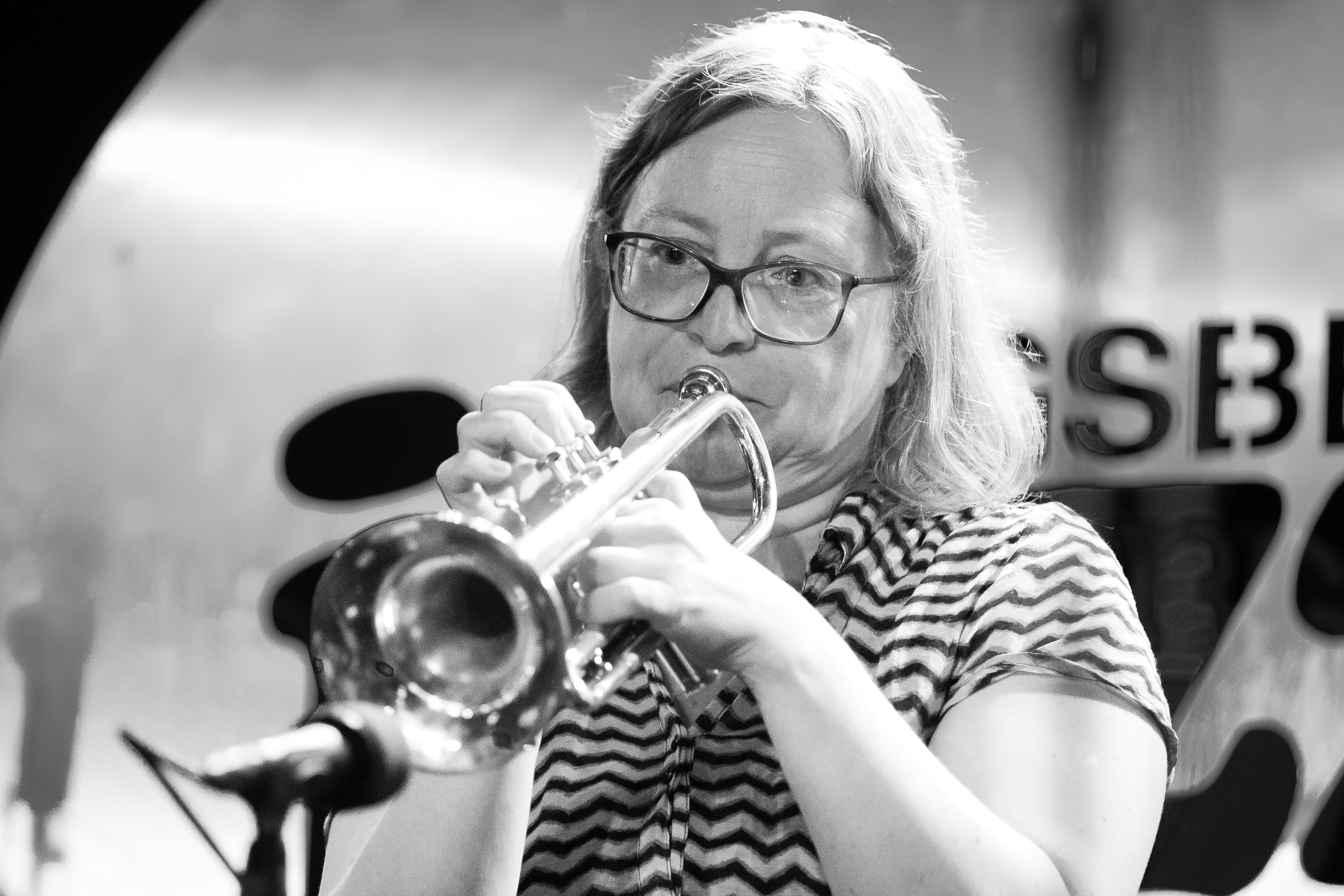
- Gunhild Seim performing at Energimølla, Kongsberg 2025; Photo: Tore Sætre

Background information
- Born: 4 June 1973 (age 53); Gjøvik, Oppland
- Origin: Norway
- Genres: Jazz
- Occupation: Musician
- Instruments: Trumpet, percussion, vocals
- Labels: Drollehala Records; Mudi Records; Master Records
- Website: gunhildseim.com

Gunhild Seim (born 4 June 1973 in Gjøvik, Norway) is a Norwegian jazz musician (trumpet) and composer.

== Career ==
Involved in bands like the jazz quartet Gunhild Seim & Time Jungle and the contemporary ensemble Kitchen Orchestra. Having released several albums and written commissioned works including Story Water for the Vossajazz 2012. As part of the Stavanger jazz and contemporary music scene including the bands "Kitchen Orchestra" and "Time Jungle", and with the latter she has been touring Norway, Sweden, the U.K. and Germany. Seim is in constant search for new ideas. Thus her music also are inspired by everything from electronic and psychedelic rock to folk and country.

Seim has composed music for the likes of 'The Norwegian Wind Ensemble', Marilyn Crispell, Katya Sourikova, 'Banff Jazz Orchestra' and Trym Bjønnes. Her has been performing under the leadership of musicians and composers like Alex Von Schlippenbach, Evan Parker, Keith Tippett, Nils Henrik Asheim and many others. In May 2012 she was invited to collaborate with the 'Kitchen Orchestra', doing a residency lasting for five days, at the Superdeluxe, a center for experimental music, performance and art in Tokyo.

== Discography ==
=== Solo albums ===
Within "Time Jungle»

- 2007: Time Jungle (Master Records)
- 2009: Morpho (Mudi Records)
- 2012: Elephant Wings (Drollehala Records), feat Marilyn Crispell

=== Singles ===
With "Kitchen Orchestra»

- 2010: Jul (I Sin Helhet) På Jæren (Checkpoint Charlie Audio Productions), with Pål Jackman
- 2011: Pumper Julen Rett Inn (Checkpoint Charlie Audio Productions)
