= And Your Ivory Voice Sings =

Studio album by Marilyn Crispell and Doug James
- Released: 1985
- Recorded: March 7–9, 1985
- Venue: Woodstock Recording Studio, Woodstock, N.Y.
- Genre: Free Jazz
- Label: Leo Records; LR 126
- Producer: Leo Feigin

And Your Ivory Voice Sings is an album by pianist Marilyn Crispell and drummer Doug James. It was recorded at the Woodstock Recording Studio in Woodstock, N.Y, in March 1985 and was released later that year by Leo Records.

The contents of the album were reissued by the Golden Years Of New Jazz label in 2001 as part of the compilation Selected Works 1983-1986.

== Reception ==
Professional ratings
Review scores
Source	Rating
AllMusic	3/5 stars
The Penguin Guide to Jazz	3/4 stars
The Encyclopedia of Popular Music	3/5 stars

In a review for AllMusic, Scott Yanow wrote: "Drummer Doug James joins the explosive pianist Marilyn Crispell for a set of passionate duets. On six originals and a spiritual version of John Coltrane's 'After the Rain,' Crispell plays with impressive power and more emotional variety than one might expect. Open-eared listeners will enjoy this somewhat obscure Leo release."

The authors of the Penguin Guide to Jazz Recordings noted that the album's title track is dedicated to Cecil Taylor and stated that it "captures something of Taylor's furious percussive poetry."

Regarding Crispell's rendition of Coltrane's "After the Rain", writer Graham Lock commented: "She brilliantly exemplifies Coltrane's sense of spiritual questing, laying bare the heart of the music, hammering at its secrets and moving from delicacy through frantic turmoil to a final, accepting peace." Lock concluded: "she has finally found her ivory voice, and on a song, she must now be one of the most exciting improvisers in creative music, lyrical proof of William Blake's dictum that Energy is eternal delight."

== Track listing ==
"After the Rain" by John Coltrane. Remaining tracks by Marilyn Crispell.

1. "Element Air ... Leap" – 3:53
2. "Opium Dream Eyes" – 7:55
3. "Minstrels" – 7:40
4. "On and Off the Beaten Track" – 6:18
5. "Song for Jeanne Lee" – 3:25
6. "And Your Ivory Sings (for Cecil Taylor)" – 4:50
7. "After the Rain" – 8:22

== Personnel ==
- Marilyn Crispell – piano
- Doug James – drums
