= Dark Night, and Luminous =

Live album by Marilyn Crispell, Agustí Fernández
- Released: 1998
- Recorded: November 24, 1995
- Venue: Mercat de les Flors, Barcelona
- Genre: Jazz
- Length: 59:35
- Label: Nova Era
- Producer: Agustí Fernández

Marilyn Crispell chronology
Nothing Ever Was, Anyway: Music of Annette Peacock (1997)	Dark Night, and Luminous (1998)	Amaryllis (2001)

Dark Night, and Luminous is an album by American jazz pianist Marilyn Crispell and Spanish pianist Agustí Fernández, which was recorded live in 1995 during the 2nd Festival de Música del segle XX and released on the Spanish Nova Era label.

== Reception ==
Professional ratings
Review scores
Source	Rating
The Penguin Guide to Jazz	3/4 stars

The Penguin Guide to Jazz notes that "It is interesting to hear Crispell working with another keyboard player and to compare this with the much more muscular collaboration with Irene Schweizer. Dark Night, and Luminous is almost sentimental by comparison."

== Track listing ==
All compositions by Crispell/Fernández except as indicated

1. "Part I" – 6:47
2. "Part II" – 8:16
3. "Part III" – 5:00
4. "Part IV" – 6:28
5. "Part V" – 4:13
6. "Part VI" (Agustí Fernández) – 4:30
7. "Part VII" (Marilyn Crispell) – 4:24
8. "Part VIII" – 11:44
9. "Cançó número 6" (Frederic Monpou) – 8:13

== Personnel ==
- Marilyn Crispell – piano
- Agustí Fernández – piano
