= Scott Fields =

American guitarist, composer, & bandleader (born 1960)

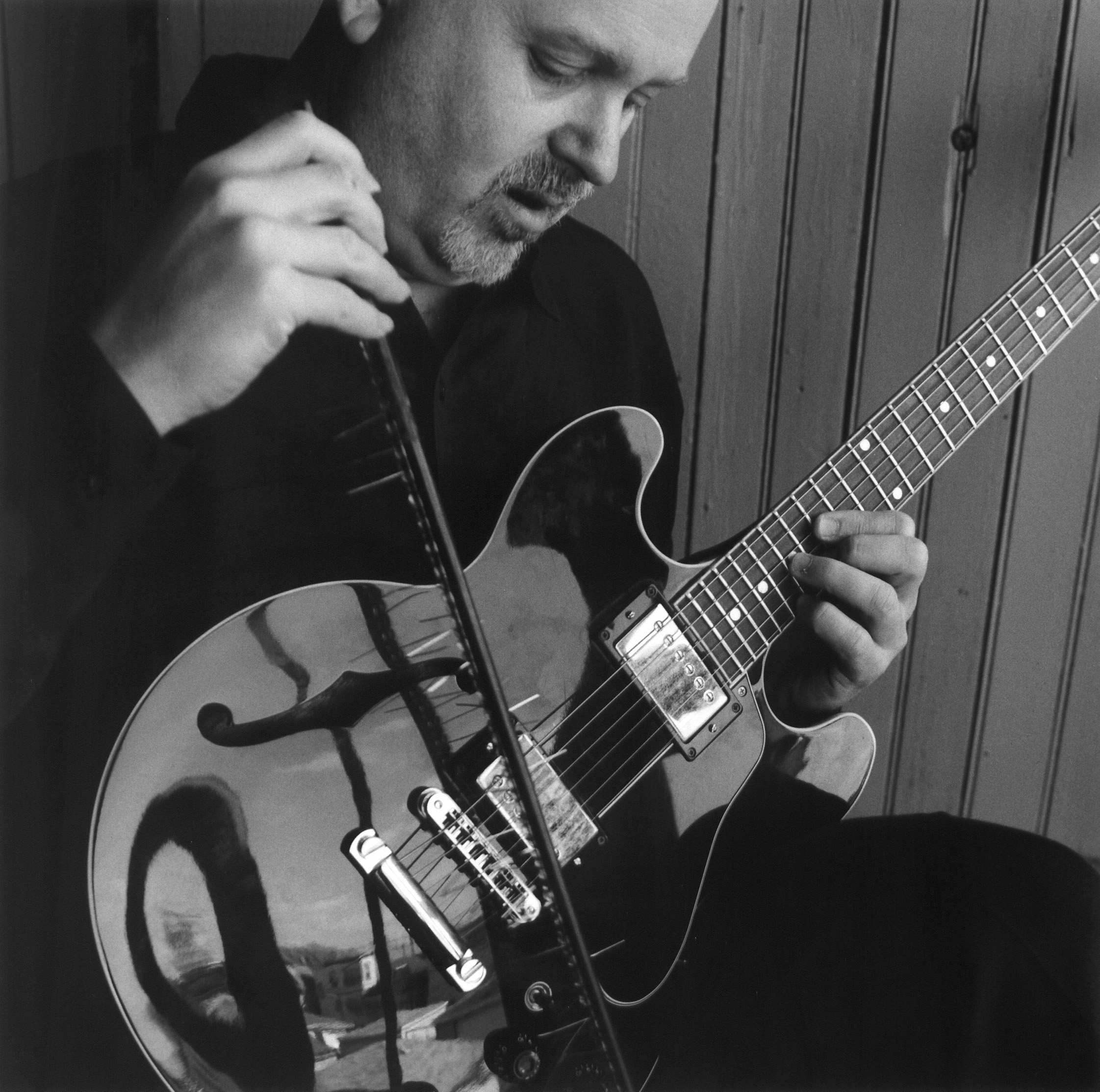
- Chicago, 2001, by Whitney Bradshaw

Background information
- Born: September 30, 1960 (age 65); Chicago, Illinois, U.S.
- Genres: Avant-garde jazz, experimental
- Occupation: Musician
- Instrument: Guitar
- Years active: 1970s–present
- Labels: Clean Feed, Cadence Jazz, Music & Arts, RogueArt
- Website: www.scottfields.com

Scott Fields (born September 30, 1960 in Chicago, Illinois) is a guitarist, composer, and bandleader. He is best known for blending music that is composed with music that is written and for his modular pieces (see 48 Motives, 96 Gestures, OZZO, Seven Deserts, and Sand). He works primarily in avant-garde jazz, experimental music, and contemporary classical music.

== Biography ==
Fields was born and raised in Chicago, Illinois. He started as a self-taught rock musician but soon was influenced by the musicians of the Association for the Advancement for Creative Musicians (AACM), which was active in the Hyde Park neighborhood in which he grew up. Later he studied classical guitar, jazz guitar, music composition, and music theory. When he was a teenager Fields co-founded the avant-garde jazz trio Life Rhythms. When the group disbanded two years later, he played sporadically but soon was institutionalized for an extended period. He quit music almost entirely until 1989.

Since then he has performed and composed actively. His ensembles and partnerships have included such musicians as Marilyn Crispell, Hamid Drake, John Hollenbeck, Joseph Jarman, Myra Melford, Jeff Parker, and Elliott Sharp, as well as numerous musicians in Cologne, where he is now based.

== Discography ==
- Fugu (Geode, 1995)
- 48 Motives January 11, 1996 (Cadence, 1996)
- Disaster at Sea An Opera Seria (Music & Arts, 1996)
- Five Frozen Eggs (Music & Arts, 1997)
- Sonotropism with Stephen Dembski (Music & Arts, 1997)
- Denouement (Geode, 1999)
- Hornets Collage with Francois Houle (Nuscope, 2000)
- This That (Accretions, 2001)
- Mamet (Delmark, 2001)
- 96 Gestures (CRI, 2001)
- From the Diary of Dog Drexel (Rossbin 2002)
- Song Songs Song with Jeff Parker (Delmark, 2004)
- Christangelfox (482 Music, 2004)
- Beckett (Clean Feed, 2007)
- We Were the Phliks (RogueArt, 2007)
- Drawings (Creative Sources, 2008)
- Music for the Radio Program This American Life (Neos, 2008)
- Scharfefelder with Elliott Sharp (Clean Feed, 2008)
- Bitter Love Songs (Clean Feed, 2008)
- Samuel (New World, 2009)
- What We Talk with Stephan Rath (Neos, 2010)
- Afiadacampos with Elliott Sharp (Neos, 2010)
- Frail Lumber (Not Two, 2011)
- Minaret Minuets with Matthias Schubert (Clean Feed, 2011)
- Everything Is in the Instructions with Jeffrey Lependorf (Ayler, 2013)
- Kintsugi (Between the Lines, 2013)
- Mostly Stick (Between the Lines, 2014)
- Haydn (Between the Lines, 2014)
- Akra-Kampoj with Elliott Sharp (New Atlantis, 2015)
- Journeys Have Destinations of Which the Traveler Is Unaware with Jeffrey Lependorf (Albany, 2015)
- Burning in Water, Drowning in Flame (New Atlantis, 2015)
- Barclay (Ayler, 2018)
- Seven Deserts (New World, 2020)
- Sand (Relative Pitch, 2023)
- Réimsí Géar with Elliott Sharp (Relative Pitch, 2024)
- Throws (Between the Lines, 2024)
