= Quartet (Birmingham) 1985 =

Live album by Anthony Braxton
- Released: 1991
- Recorded: November 17, 1985
- Venue: Strathallen Hotel, Birmingham, England
- Genre: Jazz
- Length: 92:20
- Label: Leo; LR 202/203
- Producer: Leo Feigin

Anthony Braxton chronology
Quartet (London) 1985 (1985)	Quartet (Birmingham) 1985 (1991)	Quartet (Coventry) 1985 (1985)

Quartet (Birmingham) 1985 is a live album by the composer and saxophonist Anthony Braxton recorded in England in 1985 and released on the Leo label as a double CD in 1991.

== Reception ==
Professional ratings
Review scores
Source	Rating
Allmusic	3/5 stars
The Penguin Guide to Jazz Recordings	3.5/4 stars

The Allmusic review by Stewart Mason stated, "(Birmingham) 1985 is probably the least essential of the four double-disc sets that Leo devoted to Anthony Braxton's November 1985 tour of Great Britain. Of course, the hardcore Braxton fans who this release is designed for will want it because this tour of Braxton's Forces of Motion Quartet looms fairly large in the composer's legend."

== Track listing ==
All compositions by Anthony Braxton.

Disc one

1. First set – 45:10
  1. "Composition 69M (+10 +33 +96)"
  2. "Composition 110A (+96 +108B)"
  3. "Composition 60 (+96 +108C)"
  4. "Composition 85 (+30 +108D)"

Disc two

1. Second set – 44:25
  1. "Composition 105B (+5 +32 +96)"
  2. "Composition 87 (+108C)"
  3. "Composition 23J"
  4. "Composition 69H (+31 +96)"
2. "Encore: Composition 40(O)" – 2:45

== Personnel ==
- Anthony Braxton – clarinet, flute, alto saxophone, C melody saxophone, sopranino saxophone
- Marilyn Crispell – piano
- Mark Dresser – double bass
- Gerry Hemingway – drums
