= Quartet Improvisations, Paris 1986 =

Live album by Marilyn Crispell
- Released: 1987
- Recorded: November 19, 1986
- Venue: Galerie Maximilien Guiol, Paris
- Genre: Free Jazz
- Label: Leo Records; LR 144
- Producer: Leo Feigin

Quartet Improvisations, Paris 1986 is a live album by pianist Marilyn Crispell. It was recorded at Galerie Maximilien Guiol in Paris in November 1986 as part of an event titled "Decade de musique improvisee," and was released in 1987 by Leo Records. On the album, Crispell is joined by cellist Didier Petit, bassist Marcio Mattos, and percussionist Youval Micenmacher.

Didier Petit worked with Alan Silva at the IACP school, and is active in the French free improvisation scene. He appeared on Silva's albums Desert Mirage and Take Some Risks. Marcio Mattos has performed as both a cellist and a bassist, and has worked with Tony Oxley, Dewey Redman, Evan Parker, and Derek Bailey among others. Youval Micenmacher, whose name is misspelled on the album jacket, has performed with a wide range of musicians, including Tony Coe, Vincent Courtois, and Elisa Vellia, and has participated in the recording of traditional music.

The contents of the album were reissued by the Golden Years Of New Jazz label in 2001 as part of the compilation Selected Works 1983-1986.

== Reception ==
In a review for AllMusic, François Couture wrote: "Crispell had a tendency in those days to lose a bit of her distinctive personality in group settings, but the piece remains an interesting encounter, very powerful thanks mostly to Mattos, even though the fade-out at the end can be quite frustrating."

Writing for Jazz Times, Graham Lock commented: "The Paris concert comprises a single, continuous set, totally improvised, that by accident resembles concerto form. An opening of jostling statements and solos gives way to a brief yet effective slow section before Crispell's leaping phrases spark a scintillating finale."

The authors of the Penguin Guide to Jazz Recordings stated: "We remain unconvinced by the quartet... though the extraordinary Mattos holds the set together."

== Track listing ==
1. "Quartet Improvisations - Paris 1986" – 21:36
2. "Quartet Improvisations - Paris 1986" – 20:48

== Personnel ==
- Marilyn Crispell – piano
- Didier Petit – cello
- Marcio Mattos – bass
- Youval Micenmacher – drums
