= Labyrinths (Marilyn Crispell album) =

Live album by Marilyn Crispell
- Released: 1988
- Recorded: October 2, 1987
- Venue: Victoriaville, Canada
- Genre: Jazz
- Length: 45:25 (LP); 57:22 (CD)
- Label: Victo

Marilyn Crispell chronology
Gaia (1988)	Labyrinths (1988)	Duets Vancouver 1989 (1989)

Labyrinths is a solo album by American jazz pianist Marilyn Crispell which was recorded live at the 1987 edition of the Festival International de Musique Actuelle de Victoriaville and released on the Canadian Victo label. The CD edition adds a bonus track.

== Reception ==
Professional ratings
Review scores
Source	Rating
Allmusic	4.5/5 stars
The Penguin Guide to Jazz	4/4 stars

In his review for AllMusic, Stephen Cook states "Labyrinths finds avant garde jazz pianist Marilyn Crispell balancing Cecil Taylor's cataclysmic and staunchly free piano style with her own melodic and spacious take on free improvisation."

The Penguin Guide to Jazz says that "What she creates here is logically formed, expressively coherent and quietly perfect. This is one or her best records of the '80s and certainly one of the best of the solo recordings."

== Track listing ==
All compositions by Marilyn Crispell except where noted.

1. "Threads in the Ozone" – 11:57
2. "Still Womb of Light (for Ann Sheldon)" – 7:50
3. "You Don't Know What Love Is" (Don Raye, Gene de Paul) – 4:45
4. "Labyrinths" – 6:55
5. "Lazy Bird" (John Coltrane) – 3:40
6. "After the Rain" (John Coltrane) – 9:10
7. "Au Chanteur Qui Danse (for Cecil Taylor)" – 8:35
8. "Encore" – 2:30
9. "Over the Rainbow" (Harold Arlen) – 2:00

Note

- Track 1 does not appear on original LP.

== Personnel ==
- Marilyn Crispell – piano
