= A Concert in Berlin =

Live album by Marilyn Crispell
- Released: 1983
- Recorded: July 2, 1983
- Venue: Haus am Waldsee, Berlin
- Genre: Free Jazz
- Label: FMP; SAJ-46
- Producer: Jost Gebers

A Concert in Berlin is a live solo piano album by Marilyn Crispell. It was recorded at the Summer Music concert series at the Haus am Waldsee in Berlin in July 1983, and was released later that year by FMP.

== Reception ==
Professional ratings
Review scores
Source	Rating
AllMusic	4/5 stars
The Penguin Guide to Jazz	3/4 stars
The Encyclopedia of Popular Music	3/5 stars

The editors at AllMusic awarded the album 4 stars.

The authors of the Penguin Guide to Jazz Recordings wrote: "Solo performances by Crispell are dramatic, harmonically tense, and wholly absorbing," and praised the "dramatic flow and coherence" of the album. They stated that, although it is "initially rather more academic," it "develops into a powerful emotional statement that culminates, deliberately or not, with an 'America' that has nothing to do with either Leonard Bernstein or Paul Simon, but which is Crispell's own."

Milo Fine, writing for Cadence, remarked: "Crispell has a developing independence of the hands that make for some engaging interaction... Crispell's voice is developing nicely."

In an article for Music and More, Tim Niland commented: "Crispell moved to jazz through the influence of John Coltrane and Cecil Taylor, and the latter's cascading, exhilarating style imbues this rare concert recording with a sense of breathless excitement, as she uses the entire breadth and width of the instrument to her advantage in this excellent recording. The music on this album flows outward in one continuous suite with one section of music tumbling into another with grace and excitement. The music has a crystalline feel where every note is articulated like swirling snowflakes... The music is lean and very well thought out, and it is well worth investigating for fans of progressive piano playing."

== Track listing ==
"Evidence" by Thelonious Monk. Remaining compositions by Marilyn Crispell.

1. "Rounds" – 4:09
2. "Ode To Messiaen" – 5:16
3. "Spaces & Elements" – 5:53
4. "Pulsations, Spirals" – 6:22
5. "Into The Blue" – 6:07
6. "Early Light" – 4:25
7. "America" – 7:01
8. "Evidence" – 3:49

== Personnel ==
- Marilyn Crispell – piano
