= Highlights from the Summer of 1992 American Tour =

Live album by Marilyn Crispell
- Released: 1993
- Recorded: November 8, 1991; March 27, 1992; April 3, 1992; April 4, 1992
- Venue: Middletown, Connecticut; Hartford, Connecticut; Denver, Colorado; Minneapolis, Minnesota
- Genre: Free Jazz
- Label: Music & Arts; CD-758
- Producer: Marilyn Crispell

Highlights from the Summer of 1992 American Tour is a live album by pianist Marilyn Crispell. It was recorded at four locations in the United States on dates ranging from November 1991 to April 1992, and was released in 1993 by Music & Arts. On the album, Crispell is joined by bassist Reggie Workman and drummer Gerry Hemingway.

When Crispell was asked why, given the recording dates, the album was titled "...Summer of 1992...", she replied: "I don't know."

== Reception ==
Professional ratings
Review scores
Source	Rating
AllMusic	4/5 stars
The Penguin Guide to Jazz	3.5/4 stars
Tom Hull – on the Web	B+

In a review for AllMusic, Thom Jurek stated: "The physicality Crispell lays down... is based on an innate, and often deliberately shadowed under multi-faceted color schemes, lyricism. Crispell's songlike playing comes from out of the ethos of Boulez and Messiaen as much as it does from Mary Lou Williams or Taylor or Eric Dolphy. One can hear the lieder of Webern and even Kurt Weill and Berthold Brecht in her staggered improvisations that seek larger palettes for color, shape, and texture... Crispell has done her job: she's presented a variety of musical languages and intertwined them for the listener to sort."

The authors of the Penguin Guide to Jazz Recordings awarded the album 3½ stars, and wrote: "The trio... is marked by slow harmonic transformations that largely develop in the bass register, accented by piano right hand and percussion. Though several of the pieces remain 'open', there is a developing emphasis on determinant form." They praised Hemingway's playing, stating: "A strong but by no means aggressive player, he concentrates in the spaces in the music, stippling them with detail... It works wonderfully well in... combination with Workman, for which Hemingway... strips down to essentials."

== Track listing ==
All compositions by Marilyn Crispell.

1. "Suite For Trio" – 13:55
2. "Solstice" – 11:20
3. "Not Wanting" – 7:52
4. "Commodore" – 12:20
5. "Mouvements Changeables" – 7:34
6. "Rain" – 6:07
7. "Angels" – 11:10
- Tracks 4, 6, and 7 recorded on November 8, 1991, at Crowell Concert Hall, Center for the Arts, Wesleyan University, Middletown, Connecticut. Track 3 recorded on March 27, 1992, at Real Art Ways, Hartford, Connecticut. Track 5 recorded on April 3, 1992, at Montview Presbyterian Church, Denver, Colorado. Tracks 1 and 2 recorded on April 4, 1992, at Walker Arts Center, Minneapolis, Minnesota.

== Personnel ==
- Marilyn Crispell – piano
- Reggie Workman – bass
- Gerry Hemingway – drums
