= Nothing Ever Was, Anyway: Music of Annette Peacock =

Nothing Ever Was, Anyway

Studio album by Marilyn Crispell / Gary Peacock / Paul Motian
- Released: 1997
- Recorded: September 1996
- Genre: Avant-garde jazz
- Length: 87:21
- Label: ECM; ECM 1626/27
- Producer: Manfred Eicher

Marilyn Crispell chronology
Connecting Spirits (1996)	Nothing Ever Was, Anyway (1997)	Dark Night, and Luminous (1998)

Nothing Ever Was, Anyway: Music of Annette Peacock is a double album by pianist Marilyn Crispell, bassist Gary Peacock, and drummer Paul Motian recorded in September 1996 and released on ECM the following year.

== Reception ==
Professional ratings
Review scores
Source	Rating
AllMusic	4.5/5 stars
The Penguin Guide to Jazz Recordings	4/4 stars

Thom Jurek of AllMusic stated: "When the reprise of the title tracks comes around to end the set, it's not like nothing ever was, it's more like nothing will ever be the same, as this fine music and these musicians have gone through a quiet transformation in the process of interpretation. They have done Ms. Peacock proud."

The authors of the Penguin Guide to Jazz Recordings stated, "The album becomes a type of mini-opera without words, an extended portrait of one fine artist's engagement with another... Crispell has seldom (if ever) played as elegantly and with such control. Perhaps the discipline of staying within the bounds set by another composer—and one with a much more melodic approach than Coltrane, say—allowed her to free up one hitherto suppressed aspect of her musical personality. Suffice it to say that we consider this a contemporary masterpiece. To miss it would be to overlook a piano trio the equal of anything since the late Bill Evans."

Writing for the New York Times, Adam Shatz called the album "a ravishing work by a group whose members seemed to enjoy near-complete telepathy", commenting: "Nothing Ever Was, Anyway gave the first intimation of a different Ms. Crispell: elegiac, meditative, more inclined to let the spaces between the notes breathe. The Annette Peacock tribute, which marked the beginning of her association with ECM... seems to have liberated her."

In an article for Jazz Times, Bill Shoemaker wrote, "Nothing Ever Was, Anyway is a triumph of the potentially corrosive collaborative process. This was a project that would have steamrolled a less assured artist, as Crispell was working with an exacting composer, arguably the strongest willed, hands-on producer in the industry, and two musicians with decades-long experience with Annette Peacock's music... Yet Crispell clearly emerges as first among equals on this extraordinary two-disc album... it becomes plain that Crispell has adroitly brought an unvarnished emotionalism to an arcane body of work, a quality that is increasingly important in her work. What is especially striking about Crispell's interpretations is her acute awareness that the pathos of Peacock's music is prone to over-inflation; accordingly, she frequently uses... a deliberate attack to let the intrinsic dramatic qualities of Peacock's music unfold."

== Track listing ==
All compositions by Annette Peacock

Disc one

1. "Nothing Ever Was, Anyway [Version 1]" - 10:04
2. "Butterflies That I Feel Inside Me" - 6:53
3. "Open, to Love" - 8:03
4. "Cartoon" - 4:12
5. "Albert's Love Theme" - 8:43
6. "Dreams (If Time Weren't)" (with Annette Peacock) - 8:56

Disc two

1. "Touching" - 6:43
2. "Both" - 5:53
3. "You've Left Me" - 5:24
4. "Miracles" - 3:51
5. "Ending" - 4:02
6. "Blood" - 2:50
7. "Nothing Ever Was, Anyway [Version 2]" - 11:57

== Personnel ==
=== Musicians ===
- Marilyn Crispell – piano
- Gary Peacock – bass
- Paul Motian – drums

=== Guest musician ===
- Annette Peacock – voice (on "Dreams (If Time Weren't)")

=== Technical personnel ===
- Manfred Eicher – producer
- Jan Erik Kongshaug – engineer
- Sascha Kleis – design
- Jim Bengston – cover photo
