= Live in Zurich (Marilyn Crispell album) =

Live album by Marilyn Crispell
- Released: 1990
- Recorded: April 15, 1989
- Venue: Rote Fabrik, Zürich
- Genre: Jazz
- Length: 52:04
- Label: Leo
- Producer: Leo Feigin

Marilyn Crispell chronology
Duets Vancouver 1989 (1989)	Live in Zurich (1990)	Live in San Francisco (1990)

Live in Zurich is an album by American jazz pianist Marilyn Crispell, which was recorded in 1989 and released on the English Leo label. It was the second of three concerts which her trio with bassist Reggie Workman and drummer Paul Motian gave in Switzerland.

== Reception ==
Professional ratings
Review scores
Source	Rating
AllMusic	4/5 stars
The Penguin Guide to Jazz	3/4 stars
Tom Hull – on the Web	A−

In a review for AllMusic, Ron Wynn wrote: "Crispell keeps cranking out furious, aggressive free dates for the European market. They're devoid of any devices now in vogue on the jazz circuit: no standards, no electronics, no hard bop, Adult Contemporary, strings, or fusion. If you enjoy hearing spirited dialogues between Crispell, bassist Reggie Workman, and drummer Paul Motian, this one's for you."

The authors of the Penguin Guide to Jazz Recordings stated: "There are moments of clutter on this set ... but also signs that Crispell had found a group that allowed her to extend her rhythmic ideas still further. Signing off with Coltrane's 'Dear Lord' was a familiar enough tactic by this stage, but listen to how she relocates the song's harmonies by subtly distorting its metre. A fine and affecting performance and a very enjoyable record."

== Track listing ==
All compositions by Marilyn Crispell except where noted.

1. "Areas / Solstice" – 21:59
2. "Night Light Beach II" – 10:06
3. "Duets / Point on Time" – 13:39
4. "Dear Lord" (John Coltrane) – 6:20

== Personnel ==
- Marilyn Crispell – piano, voice
- Reggie Workman - bass
- Paul Motian - drums
