= Duets Vancouver 1989 =

Live album by Anthony Braxton and Marilyn Crispell
- Released: 1990
- Recorded: June 30, 1989
- Venue: The Western Front, Vancouver International Jazz Festival, Canada
- Genre: Jazz
- Length: 44:35
- Label: Music & Arts; CD-611

Anthony Braxton chronology
2 by 2 (1989)	Duets Vancouver 1989 (1990)	Eight (+3) Tristano Compositions, 1989: For Warne Marsh (1989)

Marilyn Crispell chronology
Labyrinths (1988)	Duets Vancouver 1989 (1989)	Live in Zurich (1990)

Duets Vancouver 1989 is a live album by American saxophonist and composer Anthony Braxton with pianist Marilyn Crispell recorded at the Vancouver Jazz Festival in 1989 and released on the Music & Arts label.

== Reception ==
Professional ratings
Review scores
Source	Rating
AllMusic	3/5 stars
The Penguin Guide to Jazz Recordings	3.5/4 stars

The AllMusic review by Scott Yanow stated "The music is a mixture of composition and improvisation (it is often difficult to know which is which). Although it will not win any new converts who are put off by the complexity of Braxton's music, repeated listenings to these dynamic performances will result in listeners gain in better understanding and appreciating these masterful musicians".

The authors of the Penguin Guide to Jazz Recordings wrote: "The Vancouver duets are as warmly approachable as anything Braxton has done. There is no soft pedaling from Crispell, and she may even be the more compelling voice."

Author Francis Davis commented: "On Duets Vancouver 1989... Braxton and... Crispell make improvised Webern out of four of Braxton's diagrammatic compositions. In the process Crispell demonstrates her ability to animate even Braxton's most static lines..."

Bill Shoemaker praised Crispell for "a command of Braxton's music that no other pianist has as consistently demonstrated," and wrote: "Her pace-setting performance on the non-stop Duets Vancouver 1989 has a palpable energy. It's this quality that prompts occasional comparisons to Cecil Taylor; but, throughout the program, Crispell's motivic orientation and tactical use of clusters, crossovers, and percussive octaves are clearly her own."

== Track listing ==
All compositions by Anthony Braxton.

1. "Composition No. 136" - 10:11
2. "Composition No. 140 (+ 112 + 30)" - 11:50
3. "Composition No. 62" - 11:01
4. "Composition No. 116" - 12:25

== Personnel ==
- Anthony Braxton – alto saxophone, flute
- Marilyn Crispell – piano
