= Rhythms Hung in Undrawn Sky =

Live album by Marilyn Crispell
- Released: 1983
- Recorded: May 7, 1983
- Venue: Soundscape, New York City
- Genre: Free Jazz
- Label: Leo Records; LR 118

Rhythms Hung in Undrawn Sky is a live solo piano album by Marilyn Crispell. It was recorded at Soundscape in New York City in May 1983, and was released later that year by Leo Records.

The contents of the album were reissued by the Golden Years Of New Jazz label in 2001 as part of the compilation Selected Works 1983-1986.

== Reception ==
Professional ratings
Review scores
Source	Rating
AllMusic	3/5 stars
The Penguin Guide to Jazz	2.5/4 stars

In a review for AllMusic, Scott Yanow wrote: "As strong as she sounds in groups, pianist Marilyn Crispell is consistently heard at her best when playing unaccompanied solos. She explores five originals... on this fairly rare Leo album... The music is quite intense, if occasionally lyrical, with Crispell displaying both the influence of Cecil Taylor and her own musical personality."

The authors of the Penguin Guide to Jazz Recordings stated: "Solo performances by Crispell are dramatic, harmonically tense, and wholly absorbing," but noted that Rhythms is "a shade tentative and surprisingly introverted." Regarding the reissue of the album as part of the 2001 compilation, the authors stated that they "long canvassed for the return" of the music, and commented: "Crispell's supposed [Cecil] Taylor influence is never as evident in reality as it threatens to be in theory, and the... record is much more obviously influenced by Coltrane's piled harmonies and increasingly inventive rhythmic language."

Writing for All About Jazz, Glenn Astarita called "Archaic Visions Part I" "a solo piano tour de force," and remarked: "Ms. Crispell utilizes blues and jazz-based motifs as forums for abstract thematic developments, rendered via fluctuating meter and rapid crescendos. However, Ms. Crispell's Cecil Taylor-like left hand, right hand mode of attack is marked by mini themes, awash with stirring melodies and intricate harmonic developments."

== Track listing ==
All compositions by Marilyn Crispell.

1. "Archaic Visions Part I" – 10:48
2. "Love" – 7:18
3. "Rhythms Hung In Undrawn Sky" – 5:46
4. "Song For Abdullah" – 8:31
5. "Sadness" – 7:50
6. "Archaic Visions Part II" – 7:06

== Personnel ==
- Marilyn Crispell – piano
