= In Motion (Richard Poole, Gary Peacock, and Marilyn Crispell album) =

Studio album by Richard Poole, Gary Peacock, and Marilyn Crispell
- Released: 2016
- Recorded: November 6, 2014
- Studio: Nevessa Production, Woodstock, New York
- Genre: Free jazz
- Label: Intakt; CD 264
- Producer: Intakt Records, Patrik Landolt, Richard Poole

In Motion is an album by drummer Richard Poole, bassist Gary Peacock, and pianist Marilyn Crispell. It was recorded at Nevessa Production in Woodstock, New York in November 2014, and was released in 2016 by Intakt Records.

== Reception ==
Professional ratings
Review scores
Source	Rating
All About Jazz	4/5 stars

In a review for The New York City Jazz Record, John Sharpe called the album "a real gem," and noted: "Even the improvisations sound like songs."

Writing for Point of Departure, Jason Bivins commented: "As is the case with much of Crispell's music over the last two decades, much of this playing is understated and lyrical (if unpredictably so). This subtlety is matched by Poole and Peacock... a very strong date."

Derek Taylor, in an article for Dusted Magazine, stated: "Together, these three players lend credence to the old (if contested and reductive) adage that free improvisation yields the finest results when realized between fresh acquaintances."

In a review for London Jazz News, Patrick Hadfield wrote: "Improvised music is often described in terms of a conversation between the musicians. In this case they speak eloquently and emotionally... Many of the pieces... have the feel of fully formed, composed tunes... Other pieces have more of the uncertain exploration one might expect from free improvisation."

Writing for The Whole Note, Raul da Gama remarked: "These leading exponents of their instruments almost intuitively bring dramatic, fresh tones and textures to notes and chords that you have heard hundreds of times before. The almost vocal styles of Crispell and Peacock have endeared them to generations of free-thinking musicians and here they show why... the repertoire... is full of joyous evocation and revels in the über-virtuosity of all three musicians whose brilliance has no limits."

Eddie Myer's article for Jazz Views states: "there's a real unity of atmosphere between the disparate titles that speaks volumes about the coherence of the trio's musical vision - the record has a real vibe that's perfectly realised by the unobtrusive virtuosity of the participants. This is a record of exciting, exploratory modern music by three masters in the field, perfectly in tune with each other."

== Track listing ==
"Gary's Theme" composed by Gary Peacock. Remaining tracks by Gary Peacock, Marilyn Crispell, and Richard Poole.

1. "Ahzân" – 7:26
2. "Backseat of the Galaxy" – 6:21
3. "Dichotomy" – 6:30
4. "And Yet" – 3:46
5. "Serakunda" – 5:41
6. "In Motion" – 7:04
7. "Isle of Nowhere" – 4:58
8. "Gary's Theme" – 7:43
9. "Blue Streets Up and Down" – 5:45
10. "Lucid Air" – 3:14

== Personnel ==
- Marilyn Crispell – piano
- Gary Peacock – bass
- Richard Poole – drums
