= Amaryllis (Marilyn Crispell album) =

Studio album by Marilyn Crispell
- Released: 19 March 2001
- Recorded: February 2000
- Studio: Avatar (New York, New York)
- Genre: Avant-garde jazz
- Length: 55:04
- Label: ECM; ECM 1742
- Producer: Manfred Eicher

Marilyn Crispell chronology
Dark Night, and Luminous (1998)	Amaryllis (2001)	Storyteller (2003)

Amaryllis is an album by jazz pianist Marilyn Crispell recorded in February 2000 and released on ECM March the following year. The trio features rhythm section Gary Peacock and Paul Motian.

== Background ==
According to Crispell, four of the pieces on the album were improvised. In an interview, she recalled: "The title piece, 'Amaryllis,' sounds completely written, but it's not at all. Gary started a bass line, I came in with something, and we ended up playing the same lines at the same time. That's a very intimate thing. Something that I think is not as easy to pull off in a performance. It can be done, but the intimacy of the recording studio was particularly conducive to complete improvisation."

== Reception ==
Professional ratings
Review scores
Source	Rating
AllMusic	4/5 stars
The Penguin Guide to Jazz Recordings	4/4 stars
Tom Hull – on the Web	B+
The Guardian	4/5 stars

In an article for The Guardian, John Fordham commented: "Like running into a relative of somebody you know well, this probing set betrays a gesture here, a mannerism there, a certain chime to a laugh or intensity of glance that is at once familiar and new... This set has Crispell investigating a more lyrical and less awesomely pianistic music... Not all the music is reflective... on the fast, liquid 'Rounds' Crispell plays a devastating solo of tidal energies and hurtling precision. Maybe it is too close to contemporary classical music... for some jazz listeners, but this represents the continuing evolution of a remarkable force, in an ideal context."

Writing for The New York Times, Adam Shatz stated: "Amaryllis is less rarefied than her previous record, suffused with a romanticism that Nothing Ever Was, Anyway hinted at but ultimately held in check. It's also a record by a mature woman who knows something of solitude: sorrowful yet finally affirmative, in the way that Joni Mitchell can be."

The authors of the Penguin Guide to Jazz Recordings awarded the album 4 stars, calling it "a lovely set, intense and languid by turns and full of wonderful invention," and stated: "The piano tone is gorgeous and Peacock is playing with a fuller voice than ever. A record to absorb yourself in many times over."

The AllMusic review by Thom Jurek awarded the album 4 stars stating: "on Amaryllis, Crispell, Peacock, and Motian have established a new yet authoritative voice in melodic improvisation for the jazz trio."

== Track listing ==
All compositions by Marilyn Crispell except as indicated

1. "Voice from the Past" (Gary Peacock) - 5:54
2. "Amaryllis" - 3:33
3. "Requiem" (Peacock) - 4:40
4. "Conception Vessel / Circle Dance" (Paul Motian) - 5:35
5. "Voices" (Motian) - 4:28
6. "December Greenwings" (Peacock) - 4:07
7. "Silence (For P.)" - 3:17
8. "M.E. (For Manfred Eicher)" (Motian) - 5:15
9. "Rounds" - 4:05
10. "Avatar" - 4:14
11. "Morpion" (Motian) - 3:30
12. "Prayer" (Mitchell Weiss) - 5:42

== Personnel ==
- Marilyn Crispell – piano
- Gary Peacock – double bass
- Paul Motian – drums
