= Red (Marilyn Crispell and Stefano Maltese album) =

Live album by Marilyn Crispell and Stefano Maltese
- Released: 2000
- Recorded: September 6, 1999
- Venues: A.S.A.M. Auditorium, Chiesa di San Pietro, Siracusa, Italy
- Genre: Free Jazz
- Labels: Black Saint; 120199-2
- Producer: Stefano Maltese

Red is a live album by pianist Marilyn Crispell and saxophonist Stefano Maltese. It was recorded at the A.S.A.M. Auditorium in Chiesa di San Pietro, Siracusa, Italy in September 1999, and was released in 2000 by the Black Saint label. The duo, with vocalist Giocondo Cilio, recorded the album Blue the following day.

== Reception ==
Professional ratings
Review scores
| Source | Rating |
|---|---|
| AllMusic | 4.5/5 stars |
| The Penguin Guide to Jazz | 3/4 stars |
| Tom Hull – on the Web | B+ |

In a review for AllMusic, Thom Jurek wrote: "This set is approached from the position of opposites attracting. Maltese has been deeply influenced by the phrasing and lyrical construction... of Steve Lacy... Crispell, who plays percussively, was at the disadvantage here, or so it seemed. These duets are such a departure for her, her playing moves into a range of colors and emotions not usually associated with her. Her approach to counterpoint and harmonic invention here are both lyrical, favoring dynamic, to be experienced by persistence and caution rather than by forcing the music to bend to her will. Here, she is clearly its servant... this is her most restrained, graceful, elegant improvising on record. There isn't a moment here that is not, while musically very sophisticated, emotionally very moving. Highly recommended."

The authors of the Penguin Guide to Jazz Recordings awarded the album 3 stars, and stated: "At moments, this is uncannily similar to Marilyn's work with Anthony Braxton, except that the clarinettist is rhythmically much less open than the American... the standard of performance is very high."

Critic Tom Hull commented: "Sicilian saxophonist... has more than a dozen albums but little you'll find outside Italy; the first of two duos with the pianist, good-natured exploration without a lot of clash."

== Track listing ==
All compositions by Marilyn Crispell and Stefano Maltese.

1. "Afternoon Whisper" – 5:18
2. "Across The Ocean" – 5:12
3. "Lost Skies" – 6:47
4. "For These Walls" – 4:58
5. "A Star Or Two" – 11:19
6. "Towards Twilight" – 4:38
7. "Stellar Waves" – 6:33
8. "Come Slowly, Day" – 7:04
9. "Faces On Fire" – 6:36

== Personnel ==
- Marilyn Crispell – piano
- Stefano Maltese – soprano saxophone, alto saxophone, tenor saxophone, bass clarinet
