= Overlapping Hands: Eight Segments =

Live album by Marilyn Crispell and Irène Schweizer
- Released: 1991
- Recorded: June 28–30, 1990
- Venue: Workshop Freie Musik, Akademie der Künste, Berlin
- Genre: Free Jazz
- Label: FMP; FMP CD 30
- Producer: Jost Gebers

Overlapping Hands: Eight Segments is a live album by pianists Marilyn Crispell and Irène Schweizer. It was recorded at the Workshop Freie Musik, Akademie der Künste in Berlin in June 1990, and was released in 1991 by FMP.

According to producer and FMP founder Jost Gebers, the recording came about when, in 1990, there was an effort to arrange a concert series that brought together an American and a European artist on stage every day for five consecutive days. Schweizer then requested that she be paired with a female pianist. Schweizer later recalled that Crispell was the first woman pianist she had met personally. Regarding her encounter with Schweizer, Crispell reflected: "there's something authentic there... I don't know if Irène was self-taught, but... somebody who was not self-taught would never do what she does because the rules say a certain thing... it's not that she doesn't know a lot. It's just that maybe she wasn't indoctrinated."

== Reception ==
Professional ratings
Review scores
Source	Rating
AllMusic	5/5 stars
The Penguin Guide to Jazz	4/4 stars
The Virgin Encyclopedia of Jazz	4/5 stars

In a review for AllMusic, Thom Jurek wrote: "Given the stature of these two players, it's a wonder they didn't appear together before this. No matter. What occurs here is perhaps the most unified improvised duet of any on record since Pete Johnson and Albert Ammons in 1939... it still holds true as an off the cuff record, one made just yesterday while you were sitting there listening with your mouth open... At the end of the set, one is left exhausted and breathless, satisfied and literally amazed. There is only one problem: There isn't another record to play after this.".

The authors of the Penguin Guide to Jazz Recordings awarded the album 4 stars, and stated: "There are moments when it might almost be one person playing, so close is the understanding between the two women... The recording is near perfect... the music is a joy."

Milo Fine, writing for Cadence, remarked: "this disk... overall eschews safety nets for nervy sensitive interaction – a clear and articulate intertwining of voices that truly sounds like one 4-handed (and 4-footed as regards the pedal work and the stomping) pianist."

In a 1998 review for Coda, Aaron Cohen called the album "One of the essential piano recordings of the decade," and commented: "Two classically informed kindred spirits command the entire instrument (including a distinctive use of the strings) and perform with uncanny grace and urgency. While a second recording in this unaccompanied format would be welcome, one wonders what they could do with a sympathetic rhythm section."

== Track listing ==
1. "Segment I" – 6:36
2. "Segment II" – 3:48
3. "Segment III" – 9:12
4. "Segment IV" – 9:31
5. "Segment V" – 9:02
6. "Segment VI" – 9:35
7. "Segment VII" – 6:10
8. "Segment VIII" – 12:33

== Personnel ==
- Marilyn Crispell – piano
- Irène Schweizer – piano
