= Gerry Hemingway =

American drummer and composer

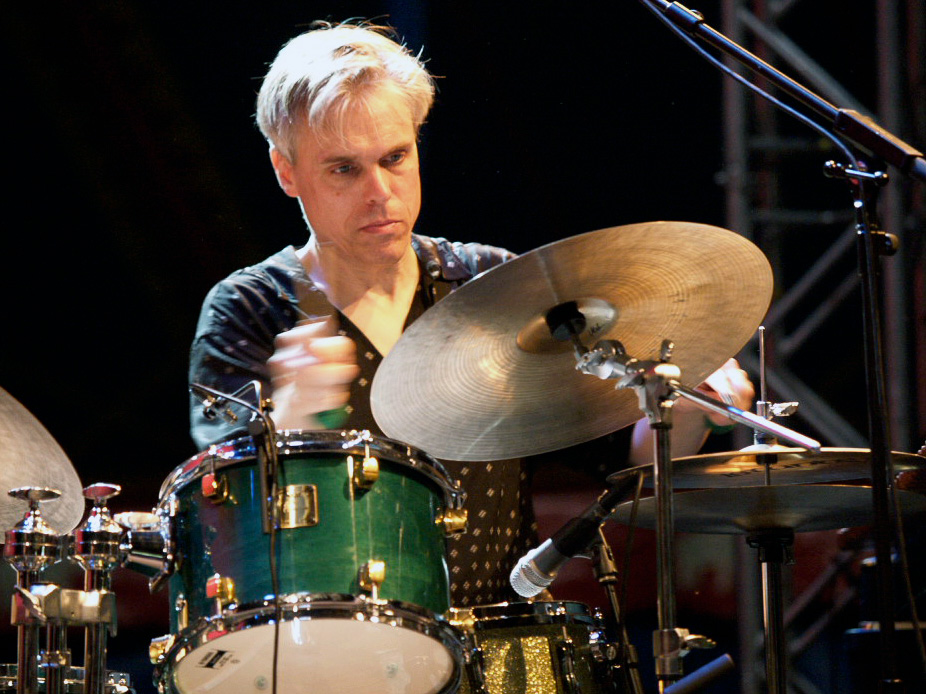
- Gerry Hemingway, Moers Festival 2007

Background information
- Born: March 23, 1955 (age 70); New Haven, Connecticut, U.S.
- Genres: Avant-garde jazz, Free jazz, Free improvisation
- Occupations: Musician, composer, record label owner
- Instruments: Drums, percussion, vibraphone, harmonica, voice, vocals, tape, sampler, electronics, live electronics
- Years active: 1970s–present
- Labels: Auricle
- Website: gerryhemingway.com

Gerry Hemingway (born March 23, 1955) is an American drummer and composer.

Hemingway was a member of the Anthony Braxton quartet from 1983 to 1994. He has also performed with Ernst Reijseger, Anthony Davis, Earl Howard, Leo Smith, George E. Lewis, Ray Anderson, Mark Helias, Reggie Workman, Michael Moore, Oliver Lake, Marilyn Crispell, Christy Doran, John Wolf Brennan, Don Byron, Cecil Taylor, and Cuong Vu.

Hemingway received a Guggenheim Fellowship for his work in music composition in 2000, and was a student of Alan Dawson. He is a graduate of Foote School in New Haven. He has recorded on over one hundred albums for the labels Clean Feed, Enja, hatArt, Palmetto, Random Acoustics, and Tzadik. He owns his own label, Auricle.

== Discography ==
=== As leader ===
- 1979 Kwambe Auricle
- 1982 Solo Works (solo) Auricle
- 1983–94 Electro-Acoustic Solo Works (solo) Random Acoustics 1996
- 1984–95 Electro-Acoustic Solo Works (solo) Random Acoustics 1996
- 1987 Outer Bridge Crossing (quintet) Sound Aspects
- 1988 Tub Works (solo) Sound Aspects
- 1991 Down to the Wire (quartet) hatArt
- 1991 View from Points West (trio w G Graewe, E Reijseger) Music & Arts
- 1991 Special Detail (quintet) hatArt
- 1991–94 Slamadam (quintet) Random Acoustics 1995
- 1993 Demon Chaser(quintet) hatArt,
- 1994 Saturn Cycle (trio w G Graewe, E Reijseger) Music & Arts
- 1995 The Marmalade King (quintet) hatArt
- 1996 Perfect World (quintet) Random Acoustics
- 1998 Johnny's Corner Song (quartet) Auricle
- 1999 Waltzes, Two–Steps & other Matters of the Heart (quintet) GM
- 1999 Chamber Works Tzadik
- 2002 Songs Between the Lines
- 2002 Double Blues Crossing (quintet) Between the Lines
- 2003 Devil's Paradise (quartet) Clean Feed
- 2005 The Whimbler (quartet) Clean Feed
- 2011 Riptide (quintet) Clean Feed

=== As co-leader ===
With Bass-Drum-Bone (Mark Helias, Gerry Hemingway, Ray Anderson)

- 1978 Oahspe (Auricle)
- 1980 Right Down Your Alley (Black Saint) (under Ray Anderson name)
- 1986 You Be (Minor Music)
- 1986–96 Cooked To Perfection (Auricle, 1999)
- 1989 Wooferlo (Soul Note)
- 1997 March Of Dimes (Data)
- 1997 Hence The Reason (Enja)
- 2005 The Line Up (Clean Feed Records)
- 2009 The Other Parade (Clean Feed Records, 2011)
- 2016 The Long Road (Auricle)

With WHO trio (Michel Wintsch, Gerry Hemingway, Bänz Oester)

- 1999 Identity (Leo Recs)
- 2004 The Current Underneath (Leo Recs)
- 2009 Less Is More (Clean Feed Records)
- 2014 The WHO Zoo (Auricle) (2xCD)
- 2020 Strell (Clean Feed Records)

=== As sideman ===
With Ralph Alessi

- It's Always Now (ECM, 2023)

With Anthony Braxton

- Four Compositions (Quartet) 1983 (Black Saint, 1983)
- Six Compositions (Quartet) 1984 (Black Saint, 1984)
- Prag 1984 (Quartet Performance) (Sound Aspects, 1984 [1990])
- Quartet (London) 1985 (Leo, 1985 [1988])
- Quartet (Birmingham) 1985 (Leo, 1985 [1991])
- Quartet (Coventry) 1985 (Leo, 1985)
- Five Compositions (Quartet) 1986 (Black Saint, 1986)
- Ensemble (Victoriaville) 1988 (Victo, 1989 [1992])
- Willisau (Quartet) 1991 (hatArt, 1992)
- (Victoriaville) 1992 (Victo, 1993)
- Twelve Compositions (Music & Arts, 1993)
- Quartet (Santa Cruz) 1993 (hatART, 1997)
- Old Dogs (Mode, 2007)

With Samuel Blaser

- A Mirror to Machaut (Blaser Music, 2013)
- Fourth Landscape (Nuscope, 2013)
- Oostum (NoBusiness Records, 2018)
- Early in the Mornin (OutNote Records, 2018)
- Moods (Blaser Music, 2021)

With Marilyn Crispell

- The Kitchen Concert (Leo, 1991)
- Circles (Les Disques Victo, 1991)
- Santuerio (Leo, 1993)
- Highlights from the Summer of 1992 American Tour (Music & Arts, 1993)
- Cascades (Music & Arts, 1996)
- MGM Trio (Ramboy, 1996) with Michael Moore
- Affinities (Intakt, 2011)
- Marilyn Crispell, Mark Dresser, Gerry Hemingway Play Braxton (Tzadik, 2012)
- Table of Changes (Intakt, 2015)

With Maybe Monday

- Unsquare (Intakt, 2008)

With Reggie Workman

- Images (Music & Arts, 1990)
- Altered Spaces (Leo, 1993)
- Cerebral Caverns (Postcards Records, 1995)
