= Music & Arts =

- Parent company: Music and Arts Programs of America
- Founded: 1984
- Founder: Frederick Maroth
- Distributor: Naxos Records
- Genre: classical, jazz, world
- Country of origin: U.S.
- Location: Berkeley, California
- Official website: www.musicandarts.com

Music & Arts is a classical and jazz record label founded in Berkeley, California by Frederick Maroth.

It began in 1984 as a classical music label before adding jazz and world music. The catalog includes classical composers and musicians Milton Babbitt, John Cage, Elliott Carter, Aaron Copland, George Crumb, Henry Cowell, David Del Tredici, Lukas Foss, John Harbison, Lou Harrison, and Leon Kirchner, Charles Wuorinen.

The jazz roster includes Ran Blake, Anthony Braxton, Jane Bunnett, Tim Cobb, Marilyn Crispell, Andrew Cyrille, Joe Fonda, Georg Gräwe, Julius Hemphill, Gerry Hemingway, Larry Ochs, Ivo Perelman, Paul Plimley, Don Pullen, John Rapson, Ernst Reijseger, String Trio of New York, and Reggie Workman. Music & Arts is a daughter company of Music and Arts Programs of America and in distributed by Naxos in the United States.
