= Unwound (Tim Berne album) =

Live album by Tim Berne's Bloodcount
- Released: 1996
- Recorded: March & April 1996; Quasimodo, Berlin, Germany (Discs 1 & 2) and a German beer hall, Ann Arbor, MI (Disc 3)
- Genre: Jazz
- Length: 195:23
- Label: Screwgun; SCREW U 70001
- Producer: Tim Berne

Tim Berne chronology
Memory Select: The Paris Concert (1995)	Unwound (1996)	Big Satan (1997)

Unwound is a live 3-CD set by saxophonist Tim Berne's Bloodcount which was recorded in 1996 and released on Berne's Screwgun label. The album was the label's first release following the demise of Berne's previous label JMT Records.

== Reception ==
Professional ratings
Review scores
Source	Rating
AllMusic	4/5 stars
The Penguin Guide to Jazz Recordings	3/4 stars

The AllMusic review by Joslyn Lane said "This is a great box set, recommended for all big fans of Bloodcount. The uninitiated should start with a smaller dose, such as Saturation Point or Discretion, since Bloodcount's music requires long attention spans (the tracks are over 20 minutes, on average) to reap the musical rewards". Writing for All About Jazz, Glenn Astarita stated "This is not easy listening for the faint at heart (although, it is less avante than one might assume). Bloodcount Unwound is a series of startling "live" performances by this tight and extremely adventurous unit. No place to hide here. It's difficult music to perform with plenty of surprises for almost everyone". JazzTimes correspondent Bill Shoemaker called it "a hard-core album, cubed".

== Track listing ==
All compositions by Tim Berne

Disc One: We're Only In It for the Food

1. "Bro'ball" - 16:28
2. "No Ma'am" - 21:33
3. "Yes Dear" - 24:43

Disc Two: An Average Daze

1. "Loose Ends" - 13:05
2. "Bloodcount" - 22:15
3. "Mr. Johnsons Blues" - 28:08

Disc Three: The Fan

1. "The Other" - 28:31
2. "What Are the Odds" - 41:19

== Personnel ==
- Tim Berne - alto saxophone, baritone saxophone
- Chris Speed - tenor saxophone, clarinet
- Michael Formanek - contrabass
- Jim Black - drums
