= Thomas Clausen (musician) =

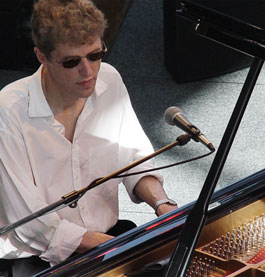

Background information
- Born: October 5, 1949 (age 76); Copenhagen, Denmark
- Genres: Jazz
- Occupation: Musician
- Instrument: Piano
- Labels: Stunt, Storyville

Thomas Clausen (born 5 October 1949) is a Danish jazz pianist and composer.

== Early life ==
Clausen was born on 5 October 1949 in Copenhagen. His brother is Bent Clausen. Thomas studied piano and composition.

== Later life and career ==
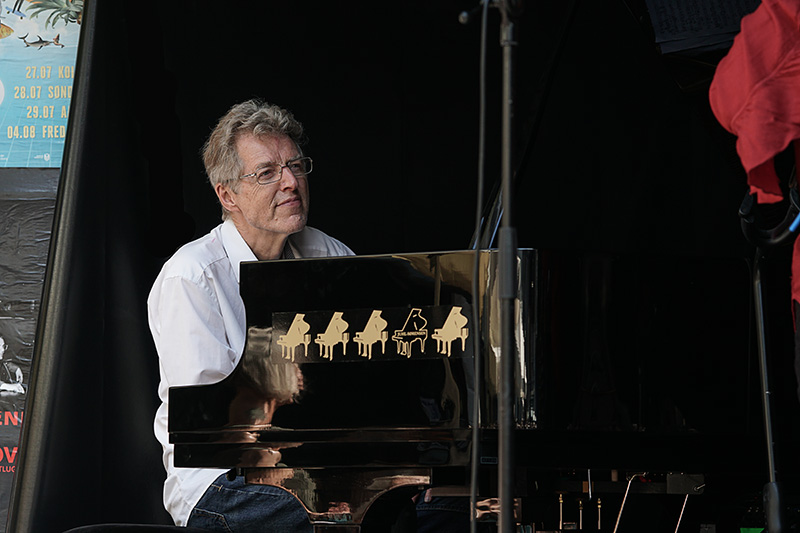
Copenhagen Jazz Festival 2018

Clausen was part of the band V8, led by Palle Mikkelborg and Alex Riel, from 1970 to 1975. He has recorded with Scandinavian jazz musicians and with Bob Brookmeyer, Eddie "Lockjaw" Davis, Dexter Gordon, Jackie McLean, Ben Webster and others. He has also led groups throughout his career.

== Discography ==
=== As leader ===
- 1982 Rain (Matrix Music Marketing)
- 1985 The Shadow of Bill Evans (BMG)
- 1988 She Touched Me (M-A)
- 1989 Piano Music (M-A)
- 1991 Café Noir featuring Gary Burton (Intermusic)
- 1992 Flowers and Trees featuring Gary Burton (M•A Music)
- 1998 Festa (with Celso Mendes) (Olufsen Records)
- 1998 Turn Out the Stars (Storyville)
- 1999 Follow the Moon (Stunt)
- 2001 Prelude to a Kiss (Stunt)
- 2002 My Favourite Things (Stunt)
- 2002 Danske Sange (Stunt)
- 2003 Balacobaco (Stunt)
- 2007 Back to Basics (Stunt)
- 2009 After the Carnaval (Stunt)
- 2014 Morning... Dreaming... (with Steve Swallow) (Stunt)

=== As sideman ===
With Tim Berne

- Open, Coma (Screwgun, 2001)

With Francisco Cali

- The Voyage (Stunt, 2016)

With Eddie "Lockjaw" Davis

- Swingin' Till the Girls Come Home (SteepleChase, 1976)

With Miles Davis

- Aura (Columbia, 1989)

With Dexter Gordon

- More Than You Know (SteepleChase, 1975)

With Jackie McLean

- Ode to Super (SteepleChase, 1973) with Gary Bartz

==== Tribute and legacy albums ====
- Symbiosis · Tribute to Bill Evans (PENTATONE, 2026), Thomas Clausen Trio (Thomas Clausen, piano, Thomas Fonnesbæck, bass, Karsten Bagge, drums), Singapore Symphony Orchestra, Jean Thorel (conductor), with Anders Malta (trumpet) and Evgueni Brokmiller (flute)
