= Shell game (disambiguation) =

A shell game is a confidence trick.

Shell game(s) may also refer to:

== Film and television ==
- The Shell Game (film), a 1918 American film
- Shell Game (TV series), a 1987 American TV series
- The Shell Game, a 1980 TVB programme
- Shell Game (pricing game), a pricing game on The Price Is Right

=== Television episodes ===
- "The Shell Game" (Voltron), 1985
- "Shell Game" (American Dad!), 2018
- "Shell Game" (My Life as a Teenage Robot), 2003
- "Shell Game" (NCIS), 2016
- "Shell Games" (Fantastic Four: World's Greatest Heroes), 2007
- "Shell Games" (Malibu Country), 2012
- "Shell Games" (SpongeBob SquarePants), 2020

== Literature ==
- "Shell Game" (short story), a 1954 short story by Philip K. Dick
- Shell Game, a 1950 novel by Richard P. Powell
- "Shell Game", a 2000 Marvel Comics issue in their Gambit series
- The Shell Game, a 2008 novel by Steve Alten

== Music ==
- The Shell Game (album), by Tim Berne, 2001
- "Shell Games", a song by Bright Eyes from The People's Key

== See also ==
- Shell corporation
