= The Sublime And =

Live album by Tim Berne's Science Friction
- Released: 2003
- Recorded: April 12, 2003; Winterthur, Switzerland
- Genre: Jazz
- Length: 110:46
- Label: Thirsty Ear; THI 57139.2
- Producer: Peter Bürli

Tim Berne chronology
The Sevens (2002)	The Sublime And (2003)	Souls Saved Hear (2004)

The Sublime And is a live double album by saxophonist Tim Berne's Science Friction which was recorded in Switzerland in 2003 and originally released on the Thirsty Ear label. The album was rereleased in 2007 along with Berne's 2002 Science Friction album as part of the Screwgun Records compilation Mind Over Friction.

== Reception ==
Professional ratings
Review scores
Source	Rating
AllMusic	4.5/5 stars
All About Jazz	4.5/5 stars
The Guardian	4/5 stars
Pitchfork Media	8.5
The Penguin Guide to Jazz Recordings	4/4 stars

The AllMusic review awarded the album 4½ stars calling it "an exhilarating, moving, and very accessible concert, which will leave the listener much as it must have left the concertgoer: awestruck". The All About Jazz review said that "The Sublime And... is a strong addition to the Berne catalog, sure to be welcomed by fans. And for newcomers, it provides a nice entry point, displaying Berne's compositional and playing aesthetics with longtime musical cohorts". Writing in The Guardian, John Fordham called it "a remarkably accessible piece of uncompromising new music from undoubtedly the best group Tim Berne has ever led". Pitchfork's Chris Dahlen said "this is the strongest record he's made yet with an electric band-- and it's one of the fiercest and importantly, most inventive performances he's captured. The Sublime And is essential for anyone looking for exhilaratingly original jazz music." Writing in JazzTimes Mike Shanley stated "Whether Berne emits clipped, octave-jumping phrases or agonized wails, he's never anything short of spellbinding. Why, after more than two decades of albums, he hasn't been given greater recognition for his work is anyone's guess".

== Track listing ==
All compositions by Tim Berne except as indicated

Disc One:

1. "Van Gundy's Retreat" - 10:43
2. "The Shell Game" - 23:59
3. "Mrs. Subliminal/Clownfinger" - 30:18

Disc Two:

1. "Smallfry" (Berne, Craig Taborn) - 6:17
2. "Jalapeño Diplomacy/Traction" - 20:15
3. "Stuckon U" - 19:14

== Personnel ==
- Tim Berne - alto saxophone
- Marc Ducret - guitar
- Craig Taborn - Fender Rhodes, laptop, organ
- Tom Rainey - drums
