= The Great Satan =

The Great Satan may refer to:

- The Great Satan (Rob Zombie album). 2026
- The Great Satan (Trivax album), 2025

== See also ==
- Big Satan, an American jazz ensemble
- Great Satan, a post-1979 Iranian epithet for the United States
