= Tom Rainey =

American drummer (born 1957)

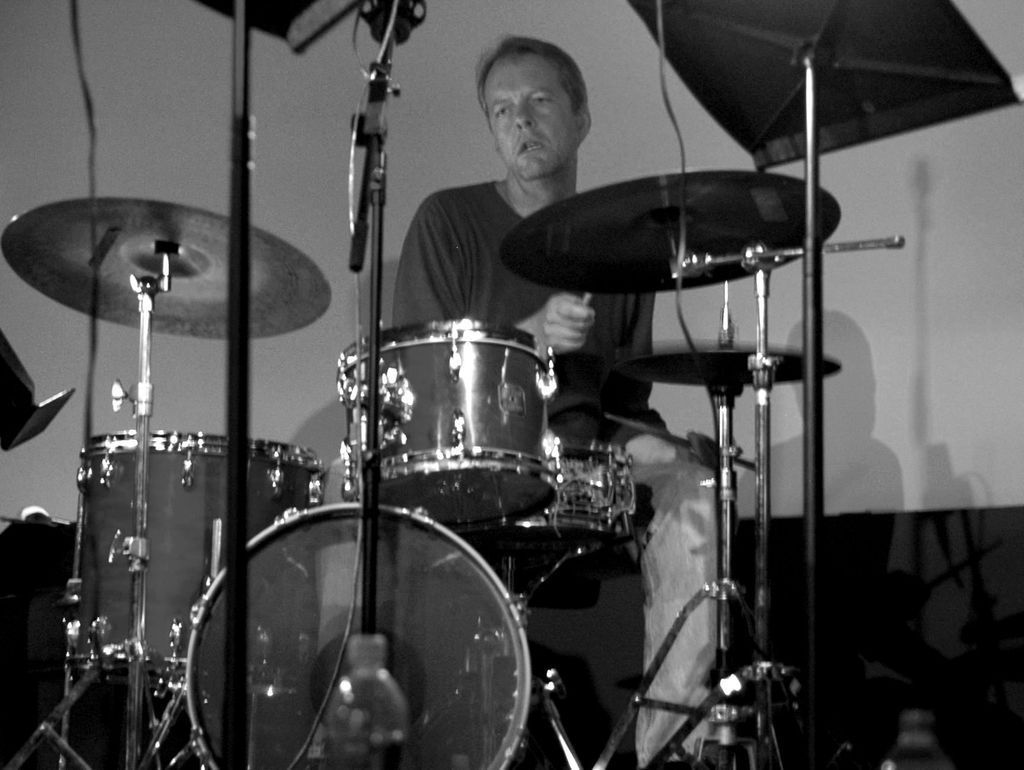
- Rainey performing Faux Faux at The Cinema, West Philadelphia, 30 July 2006

Background information
- Born: September 17, 1957 (age 69); Santa Barbara, California, U.S.
- Genre: Avant-garde jazz
- Occupation: Musician
- Instrument: Drums
- Years active: 1980s – present
- Labels: Screwgun, Clean Feed, Marge

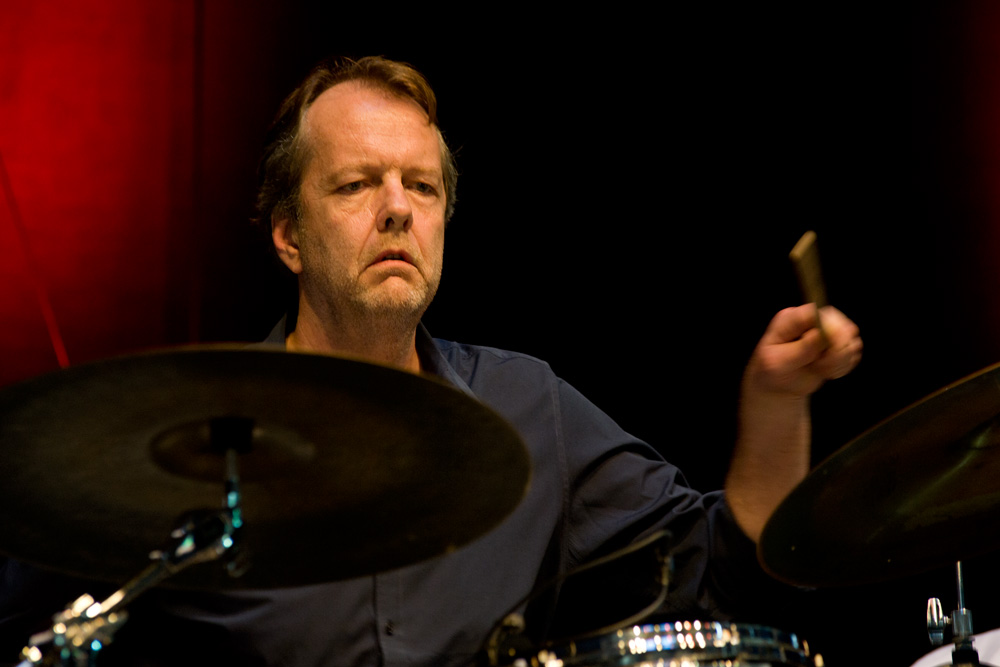
Tom Rainey, Moers Festival 2012

Tom Rainey (born September 17, 1957) is an American jazz drummer.

== Career ==
After attending Berklee College of Music he moved to New York in 1979. He has played with Tim Berne, Nels Cline, Drew Gress, Mark Helias, Fred Hersch, Tony Malaby, Simon Nabatov, Tom Varner, and Kenny Werner. From 1989 to 1996 he performed with Dave Douglas, Andy Laster, Mark Feldman, and Kermit Driscoll in the jazz quintet New and Used.

Rainey worked with Berne in the 1990s and 2000s in the bands Big Satan, Hard Cell, Paraphrase, and Science Friction. After thirty years as a sideman, he released his first album, Pool School (Clean Feed, 2010) in a trio with guitarist Mary Halvorson and his wife, saxophonist Ingrid Laubrock.

== Discography ==
=== As leader ===
- Pool School (Clean Feed, 2010)
- Camino Cielo Echo (Intakt, 2012)
- Obbligato (Intakt, 2014)
- Hotel Grief (Intakt, 2015)
- Float Upstream (Intakt, 2017)
- Combobulated (Intakt, 2019)
- Untucked In Hannover (Intakt, 2021)

=== As co-leader ===
With Simon Nabatov & Nils Wogram

- Nawora (Leo, 2012)

With Ralph Alessi, Kris Davis & Ingrid Laubrock

- LARK (Skirl, 2013)

With Ingrid Laubrock

- And Other Desert Towns (Relative Pitch, 2014)
- Buoyancy (Relative Pitch, 2016)
- Utter (Relative Pitch, 2018)
- Counterfeit Mars (Relative Pitch, 2022)
- Brink (Intakt, 2024)

With Peter Ehwald & Stefan Schultze

- Public Radio (Jazzwerkstatt, 2025)

=== As sideman ===
With Ray Anderson

- Big Band Record (Gramavision, 1994) with the George Gruntz Concert Jazz Band

With Tim Berne

- Visitation Rites (Screwgun), 1997)
- Big Satan (Winter & Winter, 1997)
- Please Advise (Screwgun, 1999)
- The Shell Game (Thirsty Ear, 2001)
- Science Friction (Screwgun, 2002)
- The Sublime And (Thirsty Ear, 2003)
- Souls Saved Hear (Thirsty Ear, 2004)
- Electric and Acoustic Hard Cell Live (Screwgun, 2004)
- Feign (Screwgun, 2005)
- Pre-Emptive Denial (Screwgun, 2005)
- Livein Cognito (Screwgun, 2006)
- Yikes Too (Out of Your Head/Screwgun, 2025)

With Nels Cline

- Currents, Constellations (Blue Note, 2018)

With Kris Davis

- Good Citizen (Fresh Sound New Talent, 2010)
- Capricorn Climber (Clean Feed, 2013)
- Waiting for You to Grow (Clean Feed, 2014)

With Mark Feldman

- What Exit (ECM, 2006)

With Ronan Guilfoyle

- Hands (Portmanteau, 2015)

With Ingrid Laubrock

- Sleepthief (Intakt, 2008)
- Anti-House (Intakt, 2010)
- The Madness of Crowds (Intakt, 2011)
- Strong Place (Intakt, 2013)
- Zurich Concert (Intakt, 2014)
- Roulette of the Cradle (Intakt, 2015)
- Ubatuba (Firehouse 12, 2015)

With Myra Melford

- The October Revolution (Evidence, 1996) featured on one track

With Liam Noble

- Romance Among the Fishes (Basho, 2004)

With Samo Salamon

- Two Hours (Fresh Sound New Talent, 2006)
- Almost Almond (Sanje, 2011)
- Duality (Samo Records, 2012)

With David Torn

- Prezens (ECM, 2005)

With Tom Varner

- The Mystery of Compassion (Soul Note, 1992)
- Martian Heartache (Soul Note, 1996)

With Roseanna Vitro

- Reaching for the Moon (Chase Music Group, 1991)
- Softly (Concord Jazz, 1993)

With Jane Ira Bloom

- Modern Drama (Columbia, 1987)
- Slalom (Columbia, 1988)
