= Electric and Acoustic Hard Cell Live =

Live album by Tim Berne's Hard Cell
- Released: 2004
- Recorded: 2004; Brooklyn and Ann Arbor
- Genre: Jazz
- Length: 45:09
- Label: Screwgun; SC 70014
- Producer: Tim Berne

Tim Berne chronology
Souls Saved Hear (2004)	Electric and Acoustic Hard Cell Live (2004)	Feign (2005)

Electric and Acoustic Hard Cell Live is a live album by saxophonist Tim Berne's Hard Cell which was recorded in 2005 and released on Berne's Screwgun label.

== Reception ==
The AllMusic review awarded the album 4 stars stating "This band is incredible. Berne and company are at the vanguard of new jazz for the 21st century, and the rapid pace at which their catalog is expanding is really separating them from the pack. Brilliant". Pitchfork's Chris Dahlen said "With its raw sound and straightforward title, Electric and Acoustic Hard Cell Live feels like a bootleg. If you ignore Steve Byram's fantastic cover art, it's easy to imagine this as a cassette labeled in handwritten scrawl: "these are the good parts."

Professional ratings
Review scores
Source	Rating
AllMusic	4/5 stars
Pitchfork Media	7.8
The Penguin Guide to Jazz Recordings	4/4 stars

== Track listing ==
All compositions by Tim Berne

1. "Van Gundy's Retreat" - 7:30
2. "Huevos" - 10:09
3. "Traction" - 11:28
4. "Manatee Woman" - 16:02

== Personnel ==
- Tim Berne - alto saxophone, baritone saxophone
- Craig Taborn - piano, keyboards, electronics
- Tom Rainey - drums
