= Smile on You =

Smile on You may refer to:

- "Smile on You", song by Bill Frisell from In Line 1983
- "Smile on You", song by Yello from You Gotta Say Yes to Another Excess
