= Un Certain Malaise =

Live album by Marc Ducret
- Released: 1998
- Recorded: 12 & 14 June; 11 July 1997; Instants Chavirés, Montreuil, Paris, France (tracks 2–6) and Festival de la Cité, Lausanne, Switzerland (track 1)
- Genre: Jazz
- Length: 48:10
- Label: Screwgun; SC 70005

Marc Ducret chronology
Détail (1997)	Un Certain Malaise (1998)	L' Ombra di Verdi (1999)

Un Certain Malaise is a live album by guitarist Marc Ducret which was recorded in 1997 and released on Tim Berne's Screwgun label.

== Reception ==
The AllMusic review by Thom Jurek said "For fans of solo guitar recordings, Ducret's experiments and compositions are more than dexterous or fascinating -- they are downright musically edifying".

Professional ratings
Review scores
Source	Rating
AllMusic	4/5 stars
The Penguin Guide to Jazz Recordings	3/4 stars

== Track listing ==
All compositions by Marc Ducret except as indicated

1. "What Did I Forget? / Old Brown Shoe" (Ducret / George Harrison) - 9:28
2. "(Détail)" - 12:47
3. "Méfiance" - 5:48
4. "Un Certain Malaise" - 12:15
5. "Le Bruit Court" - 3:13
6. "La Mazurka" - 4:35

== Personnel ==
- Marc Ducret - electric guitar
