= Incidental =

Incidental(s) may refer to:

- Incidentals, incidental expenses
- Incidentals (album)

== See also ==
- Incidental music
