= Snakeoil (album) =

Studio album by Tim Berne
- Released: 27 January 2012
- Recorded: January 2011
- Studio: Avatar (New York, New York)
- Genre: Jazz
- Length: 68:32
- Label: ECM; ECM 2234
- Producer: Manfred Eicher

Tim Berne chronology
The Veil (2011)	Snakeoil (2012)	Shadow Man (2013)

Snakeoil is an album by saxophonist Tim Berne, released on the ECM label in 2012.

== Reception ==
Professional ratings
Review scores
Source	Rating
AllMusic	4/5 stars
The Guardian	4/5 stars

The AllMusic review by Thom Jurek awarded the album 4 stars and stated "Snakeoil is unlike any recording in Berne's large catalog. The lack of physical force (though there is plenty of fire) is more than compensated for, in the thought-provoking concept and complexity with a resonant yet unconventional lyricism."

Writing in The Guardian, John Fordham commented "It's a terrific set, and an object lesson in balancing composition, improvisation and the tonal resources of an acoustic band."

The All About Jazz review by John Kelman said "That Berne and his group succeed in creating a context where freedom to coexist in such particularly seamless confluence makes Snakeoil a milestone in the saxophonist's career. The virtuosity of the quartet is never in question, and yet there's a refreshing lack of posturing and an "egos at the door" service to the music."

The JazzTimes review by Nate Chinen said "Snakeoil is a magnificent album, a standout not only in his lengthy discography but also in the recent outpouring of left-of-center jazz releases. In its carefully shifting balance of finely wrought composition and open improvisation, it reflects both a longstanding priority for Berne and a current preoccupation in modern jazz. In its impressive execution, it reflects something else: Berne’s tireless pursuit of the limber durability that can only come from the right kind of working band."

== Track listing ==
All compositions by Tim Berne except as noted

1. "Simple City" - 13:56
2. "Scanners" - 7:21
3. "Spare Parts" - 14:10
4. "Yield" (Matt Mitchell) - 12:02
5. "Not Sure" - 8:39
6. "Spectacle" - 12:02

== Personnel ==
- Tim Berne – alto saxophone
- Oscar Noriega – B♭ clarinet, bass clarinet
- Matt Mitchell – piano
- Ches Smith – drums, percussion
