= Theoretically =

Studio album by Tim Berne & Bill Frisell
- Released: 1984
- Recorded: Aug–Sept 1983; Aug 1984
- Studio: High Rise Sound; First Choice Studio, NYC
- Genre: Avant-garde jazz, downtown music
- Length: 48:48
- Label: Empire
- Producer: Bill Frisell, Tim Berne and Jon Rosenberg

Tim Berne chronology
Mutant Variations (1983)	Theoretically (1984)	Fulton Street Maul (1986)

Bill Frisell chronology
In Line (1983)	Theoretically (1984)	Rambler (1985)

Theoretically is an album by alto saxophonist Tim Berne and electric guitarist Bill Frisell, released on the Empire label in 1984, and again on Minor Music in 1986 with a bonus track recorded at the original sessions. The original features three compositions by Berne, two by Frisell, and one joint composition; the bonus track on the 1986 edition is a composition by Berne.

== Reception ==
The AllMusic review by Daniel Gioffre stated: "The overall feel of this record puts it almost into ambient territory, as Frisell's volume swells and Berne's upper register squeals blend into a single fabric of weighty yet spacious sound. It is a place where melody emerges almost as a surprise from a strangely menacing backdrop of pure atmosphere... It all works, no doubt about it, but there is room to question the quality of the source material. Overall, this is a good, if not particularly great, album from two musicians at the top of their game."

Professional ratings
Review scores
Source	Rating
AllMusic	3/5 stars

== Track listing ==
=== Original Release ===
1. "M" (Frisell, Berne) – 6:04
2. "Inside the Brain" (Berne) – 8:30
3. "Preview" (Berne) – 4:06
4. "Caroline" (Frisell) – 3:32
5. "2011" (Berne) – 16:17
6. "Perky Figure" (Frisell) – 2:42

=== 1986 Reissue ===
1. "M" (Frisell, Berne) – 6:04
2. "Inside the Brain" (Berne) – 8:30
3. "Preview" (Berne) – 4:06
4. "Caroline" (Frisell) – 3:32
5. "Ground Floor" (Berne) – 7:37
6. "2011" (Berne) – 16:17
7. "Perky Figure" (Frisell) – 2:42

== Personnel ==
- Bill Frisell – guitar
- Tim Berne – alto saxophone
