= Livein Cognito =

Live album by Tim Berne's Big Satan
- Released: 2006
- Recorded: 2006; Potaux-Razel
- Genre: Jazz
- Label: Screwgun; 70017
- Producer: Tim Berne

Tim Berne chronology
| Pre-Emptive Denial (2005) | Livein Cognito (2006) | Seconds (2007) |

Livein Cognito is a double live album by saxophonist Tim Berne's Big Satan. It was released in 2006 on Berne's Screwgun label.

== Reception ==
Professional ratings
Review scores
| Source | Rating |
|---|---|
| All About Jazz | 4.5/5 stars |

An All About Jazz review by John Kelman said "Dark and spacious in places, visceral, dense and penetrating in others, the impact of Livein Cognito can be heard in the audience's response. They may not always know how they're getting where they're going, but Big Satan fans can always be assured an intriguing trip". A JazzTimes review by Mike Shanley said "The synergy of Big Satan—Berne, Ducret and Rainey—is on full display on Livein Cognito, a two-disc live set. The herky-jerky and the ungrounded qualities of the music sometimes make things blend together".

== Track listing ==
All compositions by Tim Berne except as indicated

Disc One: Desperate

1. "Deadpan" - 10:59
2. "L' Ombra Di Verdi" (Marc Ducret) - 11:48
3. "Untitled" (Ducret) - 14:13
4. "Ce Sont les Noms des Mots" (Ducret) - 17:05
5. "Un Peu D'Histoire" (Ducret) - 9:36

Disc Two: MoreDesperate

1. "Mechanicals Failure" - 10:30
2. "Mr. Subliminal" - 12:32
3. "Untitled" (Ducret) - 16:19
4. "The Mini-Bar Incident" (Berne, Ducret) - 11:00
5. "Cause and Reflect" - 11:27
6. "BG Uh Oh" (Berne, Baikida Carroll) - 9:14

== Personnel ==
- Tim Berne – alto saxophone
- Marc Ducret – guitar
- Tom Rainey – drums
