= Pre-Emptive Denial =

Live album by Tim Berne's Paraphrase
- Released: 2005
- Recorded: May 2005; The Stone, NYC
- Genre: Jazz
- Length: 48:30
- Label: Screwgun; SC 70016
- Producer: Tim Berne

Tim Berne chronology
Feign (2005)	Pre-Emptive Denial (2005)	Livein Cognito (2006)

Pre-Emptive Denial is a live album by saxophonist Tim Berne's Paraphrase which was recorded at The Stone in 2005 and released on Berne's Screwgun label.

== Reception ==
The AllMusic review awarded the album 4 stars.

Professional ratings
Review scores
Source	Rating
AllMusic	4/5 stars
The Penguin Guide to Jazz Recordings	4/4 stars

== Track listing ==
All compositions by Tim Berne

1. "Trading on All Fours" - 24:08
2. "We Bow to Royalties" - 24:22

== Personnel ==
- Tim Berne - alto saxophone, baritone saxophone
- Drew Gress - bass
- Tom Rainey - drums
