= Science Friction (album) =

Studio album by Tim Berne
- Released: 2002
- Recorded: December 2001; Make Believe Ballroom
- Genre: Jazz
- Length: 52:02
- Label: Screwgun; SC 70013
- Producer: David Torn

Tim Berne chronology
Open, Coma (2001)	Science Friction (2002)	The Sevens (2002)

Science Friction is a studio album by saxophonist Tim Berne which was recorded in 2001 and released on Berne's Screwgun label.

== Reception ==
Professional ratings
Review scores
Source	Rating
AllMusic	4.5/5 stars
The Penguin Guide to Jazz Recordings	4/4 stars

The AllMusic review awarded the album 4 1/2 stars stating "in the case of Science Friction, the result is yet another peak in his recording career -- although when one considers Berne's other releases of the early '00s, the peak looks more like a plateau". The All About Jazz review said that "Compared to Berne's earlier efforts, Science Friction represents a high-water mark. Berne remains one of the most distinctive voices in modern jazz, who—best of all—seems to have an uncanny ability to assemble sympathetic musical collaborators who share his vision".

== Track listing ==
All compositions by Tim Berne except as indicated

1. "Huevos" - 6:27
2. "iHornet" - 3:27
3. "Sigh Fry" (Berne, Marc Ducret) - 9:50
4. "Manatee Woman" - 12:20
5. "Mikromaus" - 2:03
6. "Jalapeño Diplomacy" - 5:20
7. "The Mallomar Maneuvre" (Berne, David Torn) 1:04
8. "Clown Finger" - 11:31

== Personnel ==
- Tim Berne - alto saxophone
- Marc Ducret - acoustic and electric guitar
- Craig Taborn - electronic keyboards
- Tom Rainey - drums
