= Please Advise =

Live album by Tim Berne's Paraphrase
- Released: 1999
- Recorded: November 9, 1998; Germany
- Genre: Jazz
- Length: 62:31
- Label: Screwgun; SCR 70011
- Producer: Tim Berne

Tim Berne chronology
Cause & Reflect (1998)	Please Advise (1999)	Melquiades (1999)

Please Advise is a live album by saxophonist Tim Berne's Paraphrase which was recorded in Germany in 1998 and released on Berne's Screwgun label.

== Reception ==
The AllMusic review by William York said "Please Advise continues Berne's streak of quality releases on his Screwgun label during the late '90s, and repays the extra dedication that improvised music of such length requires".

Professional ratings
Review scores
Source	Rating
AllMusic	4/5 stars
The Penguin Guide to Jazz Recordings	3/4 stars

== Track listing ==
All compositions by Tim Berne

1. "Critical Mass" - 41:35
2. "Good Evening" - 25:01

== Personnel ==
- Tim Berne - alto saxophone, baritone saxophone
- Drew Gress - bass
- Tom Rainey - drums
