= Lowlife: The Paris Concert =

Live album by Tim Berne's Bloodcount
- Released: April 11, 1995
- Recorded: September 22–25, 1994
- Venue: Instants Chavirés, Montreuil, Paris, France
- Genre: Jazz
- Length: 76:17
- Label: JMT; JMT 514 019
- Producer: Stefan F. Winter

Tim Berne chronology
Nice View (1994)	Lowlife: The Paris Concert (1995)	Poisoned Minds: The Paris Concert (1995)

Lowlife: The Paris Concert is a live album by saxophonist Tim Berne's Bloodcount which was recorded in 1994 and released on the JMT label.

Lowlife was nominated for best mainstream jazz album at the National Association of Independent Recording Distributors and Manufacturers 1995 Indie Label awards.

== Reception ==
The AllMusic review by Dave Lynch said "there is something very special about the three JMT CDs by the Bloodcount band ... In the first of the three, Lowlife, a searching quality tends to dominate the three lengthy tracks, as the band usually takes its time reaching explicit statements of Berne's (and Julius Hemphill's) thematic material. The music even meanders, but such a description shouldn't be put in a negative light. The band is in no hurry as it investigates Berne's sonic world, but is never reduced to aimless noodling; the musicians' improvisations remain too close to theme, melody, and mode -- or compelling abstraction -- for that".

Professional ratings
Review scores
Source	Rating
AllMusic	4.5/5 stars
The Penguin Guide to Jazz Recordings	3/4 stars

== Track listing ==
All compositions by Tim Berne except as indicated

1. "Bloodcount" - 21:59
2. "Reflections - Lyric - Skin 1" (Julius Hemphill) - 17:07
3. "Prelude - The Brown Dog Meets the Spaceman" - 37:20

== Personnel ==
- Tim Berne - alto saxophone
- Chris Speed - tenor saxophone, clarinet
- Marc Ducret - electric guitar
- Michael Formanek - contrabass
- Jim Black - drums
