= The Watchman (album) =

Studio album by Erik Friedlander
- Released: August 20, 1996
- Recorded: January 30, 1996; Seltzer Sound, New York, NY
- Genre: Avant-garde, jazz, contemporary classical music
- Length: 56:05
- Label: Tzadik TZ 7107
- Producer: Erik Friedlander

Erik Friedlander chronology
Chimera (1995)	The Watchman (1996)	Topaz (1999)

The Watchman is a 1996 album by cellist Erik Friedlander which was released on the Tzadik label.

== Reception ==
Professional ratings
Review scores
Source	Rating
Allmusic	3/5 stars
The Penguin Guide to Jazz Recordings	3/4 stars

The Allmusic review by Stacia Proefrock awarded the album 3 stars stating "Friedlander has made a name for himself in the past by playing jazz cello with a style that does more than just mimic the high registers of a standup bass, and on this album he is freed even more from the expectations of the jazz tradition to create beautiful music with spiritual depth and a warm, sensual tone. The album's thematic exploration of emotion, memory, and mourning only add depth to the compositions".

== Track listing ==
All compositions by Erik Friedlander

1. "The Watchman" - 1:36
2. "Elisha (She Bears - Healing the Child - Parting the Waters)" - 12:25
3. "The Silver Bracelet: Theme" - 1:23
4. "Najime" - 9:07
5. "The Silver Bracelet" - 11:58
6. "Variations on the Watchman (Swords - The Trumpet Sounds - Night - Blood - Morning)" - 3:01
7. "Silver Like Dust" - 4:41
8. "The Watchman (Sleeps)" - 1:43

== Personnel ==
- Erik Friedlander – cello
- Chris Speed − clarinet
- Andrew D'Angelo − bass clarinet
- Drew Gress − bass
