= Clans of the Alphane Moon =

1964 science fiction novel by Philip K. Dick

- First edition cover
- Author: Philip K. Dick
- Cover artist: Ed Valigursky
- Language: English
- Genre: Science fiction
- Publisher: Ace Books
- Publication date: 1964
- Publication place: United States
- Media type: Print (hardback & paperback)
- Pages: 192

Clans of the Alphane Moon is a 1964 science fiction novel by American writer Philip K. Dick. It is based on his 1954 short story "Shell Game", first published in Galaxy Science Fiction magazine.

== Plot summary ==
War between Earth and insectoid-dominated Alpha III ended over a decade ago. (According to the novel, "Alphane" refers to the nearest star to our own system, Alpha Centauri). Some years after the end of hostilities, Earth intends to secure its now independent colony in the Alphane system, Alpha III M2. As a former satellite-based global psychiatric institution for colonists on other Alphane system worlds unable to cope with the stresses of colonisation, the inhabitants of Alpha III M2 have lived peacefully for years. But, under the pretence of a medical mission, Earth intends to take their colony back.

Against this background, Chuck Rittersdorf and his wife Mary are separating. Although they think they are going their separate ways, they soon find themselves together again on Alpha III M2. Mary travels there through government work, Chuck sees it as a chance to kill Mary using his remote control simulacrum. Along the way he is guided by his Ganymedean slime mould neighbour Lord Running Clam and Mary finds herself manipulated by the Alphane sympathiser, comedian Bunny Hentman.

== The Clans ==
On Alpha III M2, psychiatric diagnostic groups have differentiated themselves into caste-like pseudo-ethnicities. The inhabitants have formed seven clans:

The Pares are people with paranoia. They function as the statesman class. The Pare representative to the supreme council is Gabriel Baines, and their settlement is called Adolfville (named after Adolf Hitler). It is located within the northern sector of Alpha III M2, and is heavily fortified. This is where the supreme council building is, a stone, six-story-high building, the largest one in Adolfville.

The Manses are people with mania. They are the most active class, the warrior class. The Mans representative is Howard Straw. The Mans settlement is Da Vinci Heights. It is characterized as diverse but disordered, without aesthetic unity, "a hodgepodge of incomplete projects, started out but never finished." Also, this is where Alpha III M2's television transmitter is. There is supposed to be tension between them and the Pares, with the Manses constantly trying to stage a coup d'état.

The Skitzes are the ones with schizophrenia. They correspond to the poet class, with some of them being religious visionaries. The Skitz delegate to the bi-annual get-together at Adolfville is Omar Diamond. The Skitz town is named Joan d'Arc, "poor materially, but rich in eternal values."

The Heebs consist of people with hebephrenia (disorganized schizophrenia). Their settlement is Gandhitown. To the other clans, they are useful only for manual labour. Their representative is Jacob Simion. Gandhitown looks like "an inhabited garbage dump of cardboard dwellings." Like the Skitzes, some of the Heebs are religious visionaries as well; but they are inclined to produce ascetic saints, whereas the schizophrenic group produce dogmatists. An example is "the famous Heeb saint, Ignatz Ledebur, who radiated spirituality as he wandered from town to town, spreading the warmth of his harmless Heeb personality." Another notable Heeb character is Sarah Apostoles; she together with Omar Diamond and Ignatz Ledebur form "the so-called Holy Triumvirate."

The Polys have polymorphic schizophrenia. Annette Golding is the Poly delegate to the supreme council and their settlement is called Hamlet Hamlet. They are the creative members of society, producing new ideas. The children from every clan on Alpha III M2 were born Polys, went to their common, central school as Polys, did not become differentiated until perhaps their tenth or eleventh year. Some never became differentiated, though, hinting that, perhaps, some of them do not actually have mental disorders at all.

The Ob-Coms are the ones with obsessive-compulsive disorder, their delegate is Ingred Hibbler. The name of their location is not given. They are the clerks and office holders of the society, the ritualistic functionaries, with no original ideas. Their conservatism balances the radical quality of the Polys and gives the society stability.

The Deps have clinical depression. Their representative to the supreme council is Dino Watters and the name of their town is Cotton Mather Estates, where they live "in endless dark gloom."

== Reception ==
Writing in The Guardian in 2014, Sandra Newman cites Alphane as an example of "the Wild West era of science fiction, (when) plots could go anywhere or nowhere", stating that the plot is "ridiculous" and "offensive", and that "it has an effect you simply cannot produce with a book that is well written.” She concludes that “a genius's unedited ravings, however, is a thing both beautiful and rare."
