= Marc Ducret =

Danish jazz guitarist

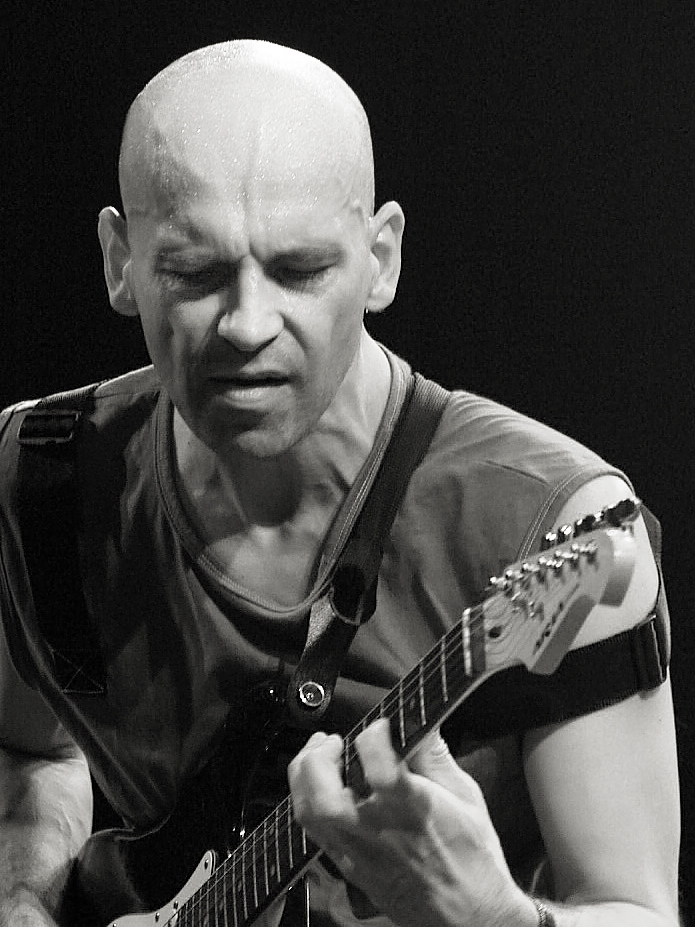
- Moers Festival, 2006

Background information
- Born: 19 August 1957 (age 69); Paris, France
- Genres: Avant-garde jazz, free jazz, free improvisation
- Occupation: Musician
- Instrument: Guitar
- Years active: 1987–present
- Labels: Label Bleu, Winter & Winter
- Member of: Big Satan
- Website: www.marcducret.com

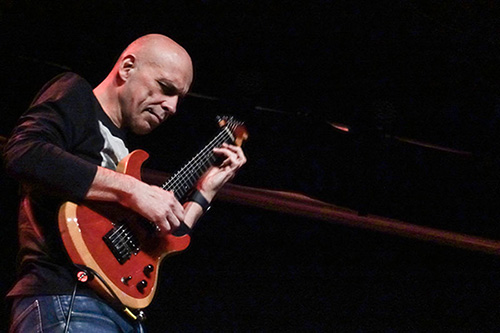
Marc Ducret (2016) in Aarhus, Denmark

Marc Ducret (born 19 August 1957) is a French avant-garde jazz guitarist who frequently collaborates with saxophonist Tim Berne.

Ducret's guitar style is idiosyncratic, having been called "highly original and very expressive," but also "Metheny-like."

== Discography ==
=== As leader ===
- La théorie du pilier (Label Bleu, 1987)
- Le Kodo (Label Bleu, 1989)
- Gris (Label Bleu, 1990)
- News from the Front (JMT, 1991)
- Détail (Winter & Winter, 1997)
- Un Certain Malaise (Screwgun, 1998)
- L'ombra di Verdi (Screwgun, 1999)
- Qui parle? (Sketch, 2003)
- Trio Live (2006)
- Trio Live No. 2 (2006)
- Le sens de la marche (Illusions, 2009)
- Tower, vol. 1 (Ayler, 2011)
- Tower, vol. 2 (Ayler, 2011)
- Tower, vol. 4 (Ayler, 2012)
- Tower, vol. 3 (Ayler, 2013)
- Tower-Bridge (Ayler, 2014)
- Metatonal (Ayler, 2015)
- Lady M (Illusions, 2019)
- Palm Sweat (Screwgun/Out Of Your Head, 2023)
- Ici (Ayler, 2023)

With Tim Berne

- Pace Yourself (JMT, 1991)
- Diminutive Mysteries (Mostly Hemphill) (JMT, 1993)
- Nice View (JMT, 1994)
- Lowlife: The Paris Concert (JMT, 1995)
- Poisoned Minds: The Paris Concert (JMT, 1995)
- Memory Select: The Paris Concert (JMT, 1995)
- Big Satan (Winter & Winter, 1997)
- Open, Coma (Screwgun, 2001)
- Science Friction (Screwgun, 2002)
- The Sevens (New World, 2002)
- The Sublime And (Thirsty Ear, 2003)
- Souls Saved Hear (Thirsty Ear, 2004)
- Livein Cognito (Screwgun, 2007)
- Seconds (Screwgun, 2007)
- Insomnia (Clean Feed, 2011)
- The Fantastic Mrs. 10 (Intakt, 2020)
- Science Friction +size (Screwgun, 2020)
- Adobe Probe (Screwgun, 2020)
- 5 (Screwgun, 2021)
- No Tamales On Wednesday (Screwgun, 2024)

With Samuel Blaser

- As the Sea (Hathut, 2012)
- Boundless (Hathut, 2011)
- Taktlos Zürich 2017 (Hathut, 2018)
- Audio Rebel (Blaser Music, 2020)
- ABC Vol. 1 (Blaser Music, 2020)
- ABC Vol. 2 (Blaser Music, 2020)
- Moods (Blaser Music, 2020)
- Voyageurs (Jazzdor Series, 2021)

With Hank Roberts

- Green (Winter & Winter, 2008)

With Liūtas Mockūnas

- Silent Vociferation (NoBusiness, 2009)
