= Michael Formanek =

American jazz bassist (born 1958)

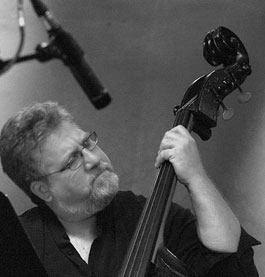
- Denmark 2010

Background information
- Born: May 7, 1958 (age 68); San Francisco, California, U.S.
- Genres: Jazz, avant-garde jazz
- Occupations: Musician, composer
- Instrument: Double bass
- Years active: 1980s–present
- Labels: Enja, Soul Note, Screwgun, ECM
- Website: amibotheringyou.com

Michael Formanek (born May 7, 1958) is an American jazz bassist born in San Francisco, California, United States, and associated with the jazz scene in New York.

== Career ==
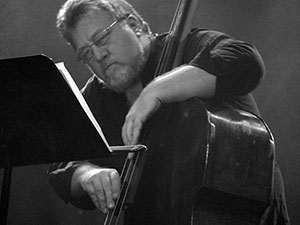
Michael Formanek in Aarhus, Denmark 2010

In the 1980s, Formanek worked as a sideman with Freddie Hubbard, Joe Henderson, Dave Liebman, Fred Hersch, and Attila Zoller. His debut album as a leader was 1990's Wide Open Spaces, featuring saxophonist Greg Osby, violinist Mark Feldman, guitarist Wayne Krantz, and drummer Jeff Hirshfield. In 1992 he released Extended Animation with the same ensemble, except with Tim Berne replacing Osby on saxophone.

In 1993, Formanek, Berne and Hirshfield recorded as a trio on the album Loose Cannon. Following this, Formanek led the septet of himself, Berne, trumpeter Dave Douglas, reed player Marty Ehrlich, trombonist Kuumba Frank Lacy, drummer Marvin Smith and pianist Salvatore Bonafede. That same year, Formanek began playing with Berne's ensemble, Bloodcount, through the end of the decade, on the albums Lowlife, Poisoned Minds, Memory Select, Discretion, and Saturation Point. His fourth album for Enja Records followed in 1996, with Douglas, trombonist Steve Swell, and drummer Jim Black.

In 1998, Berne and Formanek released Ornery People as a duo, and Formanek issued a solo album, Am I Bothering You?. He toured with Gerry Hemingway that same year. In 1999, Formanek worked in a trio with Ehrlich and Peter Erskine on drums. In 2000, he played in the quartet, Northern Exposure, with Black, Dave Ballou on trumpet, and Henrik Frisk on sax.

Formanek has done extensive work as a session musician, appearing on albums by Jane Ira Bloom, Uri Caine, James Emery, Lee Konitz, Kevin Mahogany, the Mingus Big Band, Scott Fields, the New York Jazz Collective, Daniel Schnyder, and Jack Walrath. Formanek is also a member of Lafayette Gilchrist's trio Inside Out.

Formanek was the director of the Peabody Jazz Orchestra and the jazz bass instructor at the Peabody Conservatory of Music in Baltimore, Maryland, before his amicable departure in 2018.

== Discography ==
As leader

- Wide Open Spaces (Enja, 1990)
- Extended Animation (Enja, 1992)
- Loose Cannon (Soul Note, 1993)
- Low Profile (Enja, 1994)
- Nature of the Beast (Enja, 1996)
- Ornery People with Tim Berne (Little Brother, 1998)
- Am I Bothering You? (Screwgun, 1999)
- Relativity (Enja, 1999)
- The Rub and Spare Change (ECM, 2010) with Craig Taborn, Tim Berne and Gerald Cleaver
- Small Places (ECM, 2012) with Craig Taborn, Tim Berne and Gerald Cleaver
- The Distance (ECM, 2016) with Ensemble Kolossus
- Time Like This (Intakt, 2018) with Elusion Quartet
- Even Better (Intakt, 2019) with Very Practical Trio
- Pre-Apocalyptic (Out Of Your Head, 2020)
- Dyads (Out Of Your Head, 2021) with Peter Formanek
- Imperfect Measures (Intakt, 2021)
- Were We Where We Were (Circular File Records, 2022) with Drome Trio
- Other Zones (Circular File Records, 2022)
- As Things Do (Intakt, 2023) with Elusion Quartet
- New Digs (Intakt, 2026)

With Tomas Fujiwara and Mary Halvorson as Thumbscrew

- Thumbscrew (Cuneiform, 2014)
- Convallaria (Cuneiform, 2016)
- Theirs (Cuneiform, 2018)
- Ours (Cuneiform, 2018)
- The Anthony Braxton Project (Cuneiform, 2020)
- Never is Enough (Cuneiform, 2021)
- Multicolored Midnight (Cuneiform, 2022)
- Wingbeats (Cuneiform, 2024)

With Franco Ambrosetti

- Movies (Enja, 1987)
- Movies Too (Enja, 1988)

With Chet Baker

- Burnin' at Backstreet (Fresh Sound)

With Tim Berne

- Lowlife: The Paris Concert (JMT, 1995)
- Poisoned Minds: The Paris Concert (JMT, 1995)
- Memory Select: The Paris Concert (JMT, 1995)
- Unwound (Screwgun, 1996)
- Saturation Point (Screwgun, 1997)
- Discretion (Screwgun, 1997)
- Seconds (Screwgun, 2007)
- Insomnia (Clean Feed, 2011)
- Adobe Probe (Screwgun, 2020)
- Attention Spam (Screwgun, 2021)
- 5 (Screwgun, 2021)
- Decay (Screwgun, 2022)

With Jane Ira Bloom

- Art and Aviation (Arabesque, 1992)

With Uri Caine

- Urlicht / Primal Light (Winter & Winter, 1997)
- Gustav Mahler in Toblach (Winter & Winter, 1999)
- Gustav Mahler: Dark Flame (Winter & Winter, 2003)

With Baikida Carroll

- Marionettes on a High Wire (OmniTone, 2001)

With Tony Malaby

- Sabino (Arabesque, 2000)

With Mark Murphy

- Beauty and the Beast (Muse, 1986)

With Art Pepper

- San Francisco Samba (Contemporary, 1977)

With Gary Thomas

- Pariah's Pariah (Winter & Winter, 1998)

With Jack Walrath

- Serious Hang (Muse, 1992 [1994])
