= Memory Select: The Paris Concert =

Live album by Tim Berne's Bloodcount
- Released: 1995
- Recorded: September 22–25, 1994
- Venue: Instants Chavirés, Montreuil, Paris, France
- Genre: Jazz
- Length: 69:30
- Label: JMT; JMT 514 029
- Producer: Stefan F. Winter

Tim Berne chronology
Poisoned Minds: The Paris Concert (1995)	Memory Select: The Paris Concert (1995)	Unwound (1997)

Memory Select: The Paris Concert is a live album by saxophonist Tim Berne's Bloodcount and third volume of the series which was recorded in 1994 and released on the JMT label. It was the last album to be released on the label.

== Reception ==
Professional ratings
Review scores
Source	Rating
AllMusic	4.5/5 stars
All About Jazz	4.5/5 stars
The Penguin Guide to Jazz Recordings	3/4 stars

The AllMusic review by Dave Lynch said "Memory Select takes its place as a fitting climax to the three CDs, standing strongly on its own but also feeling, appropriately, like the series' grand finale. Any listeners interested in Berne's growth as a player, composer, and bandleader should pick this up; better still to find all three of the JMT Bloodcount CDs -- subsequently reissued on Winter & Winter -- to place Memory Select in proper perspective".

Writing for All About Jazz, John Kelman stated "Memory Select - The Paris Concert III is a firm reminder that Berne is capable of more detailed orchestration—and that the concert stage may well be the place to experience this distinctive writer/performer's best work".

== Track listing ==
All compositions by Tim Berne

1. "Jazzoff" - 18:05
2. "Eye Contact" - 51:20

== Personnel ==
- Tim Berne – alto saxophone, baritone saxophone
- Chris Speed – tenor saxophone, clarinet
- Marc Ducret – electric guitar
- Michael Formanek – contrabass
- Jim Black – drums
