= Fulton Street Maul =

Studio album by Tim Berne
- Released: 1987
- Genre: Jazz
- Label: Columbia
- Producer: Gary Lucas

Tim Berne chronology
Mutant Variations (1984)	Fulton Street Maul (1987)	Sanctified Dreams (1988)

Fulton Street Maul is an album by the American saxophonist Tim Berne, released in 1987. It was his first album for a major label; he was working at Tower Records when Columbia Records decided to sign him. He supported the album with a North American tour. Fulton Street Maul was reissued in 1996.

== Production ==
Fulton Street Maul was produced by Gary Lucas, a childhood friend who helped Berne get his Columbia deal. It was only the second time Berne had recorded an album using multiple tracks. Berne was backed by cellist Hank Roberts, percussionist Alex Cline, and guitarist Bill Frisell. He was influenced primarily by Julius Hemphill and Eric Dolphy. The group limited their solos, preferring to stick to arrangements. "Federico" is an homage to Federico Fellini. The album cover art was created by Steve Byram, who went on to design several other Berne album covers.

== Critical reception ==
Professional ratings
Review scores
Source	Rating
AllMusic	4/5 stars
Chicago Sun-Times	3.5/4 stars
The Encyclopedia of Popular Music	3/5 stars
MusicHound Jazz: The Essential Album Guide	4/5 stars
Oakland Tribune	4/4 stars
Omaha World-Herald	4/5 stars
The Penguin Guide to Jazz on CD	3/4 stars
The Philadelphia Inquirer	4/4 stars

The New York Times called "Betsy" "a character study [that] involves eerie floating sounds; an elegiac tune; a static, echoic section using high overtones like Stockhausen's Stimmung, and a vaguely Arabian-sounding modal tune, wending its way into the distance"; the paper later included Fulton Street Maul on its list of the 10 best albums of 1987. The Chicago Sun-Times said that the album alternates "between shard-like soloing and seductive electronics, irreverent wit and genuinely gripping emotion".

The Sun Sentinel labeled Fulton Street Maul "an imaginative album that is rarely subtle, generally overpowering and often strange." The Washington Post concluded that "Berne often extends blues and bop themes and writes in a manner that strongly suggests the influence of Ornette Coleman... [yet] his compositions are coherent and thought-out." The Philadelphia Inquirer noted the "rigorous, as-it-happens jazz philosophy." The Plain Dealer dismissed the album as "unfocused, pompous, definitely yuppie-oriented".

== Track listing ==
No.	Title	Length
1.	"Unknown Disaster"
2.	"Icicles Revisited"
3.	"Miniature"
4.	"Federico"
5.	"Betsy"
