= Ubatuba (album) =

Studio album by Ingrid Laubrock
- Released: 2015
- Recorded: September 13–14, 2014
- Studio: Firehouse 12, New Haven
- Genre: Jazz
- Length: 56:07
- Label: Firehouse 12
- Producer: Ingrid Laubrock

Ingrid Laubrock chronology
Roulette of the Cradle (2015)	Ubatuba (2015)	Live @ The Jazz Happening Tampere (2016)

Ubatuba is the debut album by German jazz saxophonist Ingrid Laubrock's quintet featuring saxophonist Tim Berne, trombonist Ben Gerstein, tuba player Dan Peck and drummer Tom Rainey. It was recorded in 2014 and released on Firehouse 12.

== Reception ==
Professional ratings
Review scores
Source	Rating
All About Jazz	4/5 stars
Down Beat	4/5 stars
The Free Jazz Collective	4/5 stars
Tom Hull – on the Web	B+

The Down Beat review by John Corbett notes "It’s a pleasure to hear Tim Berne’s alto saxophone sounding wonderful in tandem with Laubrock and trombonist Ben Gerstein."

The All About Jazz review by Karl Ackermann states "Ubatuba is an ambitious creation in terms of Laubrock's astoundingly complex writing and in the masterful musicianship from all involved."

In a review for JazzTimes Britt Robson says about Laubrock "Her work in Paradoxical Frog and Anti-House marked her as a force to be reckoned with. Ubatuba ratifies that reputation with unique, tactile music that pricks the senses as much as it piques the intellect."

The Free Jazz Collective's Dan Sorrells wrote: "Ubatuba rewards careful and repeated listening. While clearly a vehicle for Laubrock's increasingly adventurous writing, the music provides plenty of leeway for her partners' idiosyncrasies and creativity... A great late-year entry, and an album that was certainly worth the wait."

Writer Raul Da Gama commented: "the music of Ubatuba seems to go in a circular motion, very slowly, very deliberately, very beautifully... Details in the writing are scintillating and full of surprise... [It] is a logical adaptation of all of her prior work congealing in an original score that brightens the future of the woodwind instrument in terms of tone colour, dynamic, timbre and musical scope."

== Track listing ==
All compositions by Ingrid Laubrock.

1. "Any Breathing Organism" – 10:27
2. "Homo Diluvii" – 5:55
3. "Hiccups" – 13:23
4. "Hall of Mirrors" – 4:15
5. "Any Many" – 6:26
6. "Hypnic Jerk" – 15:41

== Personnel ==
- Ingrid Laubrock – tenor sax, alto sax
- Tim Berne – alto sax
- Ben Gerstein – trombone
- Dan Peck – tuba
- Tom Rainey – drums
