= Chimera (Erik Friedlander album) =

Studio album by Erik Friedlander
- Released: November 21, 1995
- Recorded: April 17 & 18, 1995; Tedesco Studios, New Jersey
- Genre: Avant-garde, jazz, contemporary classical music
- Length: 63:06
- Label: Avant AVAN 057
- Producer: John Zorn

Erik Friedlander chronology
Chimera (1995)	The Watchman (1996)

Chimera is the 1995 debut album by cellist Erik Friedlander which was released on the Japanese Avant label.

== Reception ==
The JazzTimes review by Nancy Ann Lee stated "Containing highly imaginative, artistic chamber-jazz, Chimera finds these gifted musicians in tight, tonally colorful interactions and crackling solo moments that draw the most from their acoustic instruments. Everyone excels".

== Track listing ==
All compositions by Erik Friedlander except as indicated

1. "Alluvium" - 7:59
2. "Turbine #1" - 4:40
3. "Mercy Street" - 8:43
4. "Single Whip" - 9:48
5. "Blind Tiger" - 10:54
6. "Little Niles" (Randy Weston) - 5:57
7. "Chimera" - 5:52
8. "Fekunk" - 8:59

== Personnel ==
- Erik Friedlander – cello
- Chris Speed – clarinet
- Andrew D'Angelo – bass clarinet
- Drew Gress – bass
