= Shadow Man (Tim Berne album) =

Studio album by Tim Berne's Snakeoil
- Released: October 4, 2013
- Recorded: January 2013
- Studio: The Clubhouse; Rhinebeck, New York
- Genre: Jazz
- Length: 77:02
- Label: ECM 2339
- Producer: David Torn and Tim Berne

Tim Berne chronology
Snakeoil (2012)	Shadow Man (2013)	You've Been Watching Me (2015)

Shadow Man is an album by American composer and saxophonist Tim Berne's band Snakeoil, recorded in January 2013 and released on ECM in October later that year.

== Reception ==
Professional ratings
Review scores
Source	Rating
Allmusic	4/5 stars
The Guardian	4/5 stars

The AllMusic review by Thom Jurek awarded the album 4 stars and stated "Shadow Man's experiment, in trying to capture Snakeoil's live performance in detail and dynamic, is not only successful, it reveals this band at a peak of instinctive, intuitive creativity and imagination."

Writing in The Guardian, John Fordham commented "mingling wide-interval melodies that sometimes sound like contemporary classical music and sometimes trampling funk, quiet solos or intimate duets, tonal contrasts (warm clarinet lyricism, glimmering vibraphones, free-jazz sax wailing), dynamic percussion and unrelenting eventfulness. It's edgy, pattern spinning contemporary music, but austere it certainly is not."

The All About Jazz review by John Kelman said that "Shadow Man is an even more impressive outing from a quartet that, in a career highlighted by strong associations, may well be Berne's most impressively cohesive group yet" while Troy Collins stated "Emboldened by the sterling contributions of Berne's youthful sidemen, Shadow Man surpasses the refined austerity of Snakeoil's debut, providing a far more archetypal example of the protean ensemble's abilities."

The JazzTimes review by Thomas Conrad enthused "This band’s eponymous ECM debut last year was one of the most acclaimed jazz recordings of 2012. Shadow Man is stronger. It is wilder and deeper, an oceanic extravagance of strange sonic shapes and colors. Yet it coheres according to proprietary logic."

== Track listing ==
All compositions by Tim Berne except as indicated

1. "Son of Not So Sure" - 6:41
2. "Static" (Marc Ducret, Tim Berne) - 8:01
3. "Psalm" (Paul Motian) - 4:14
4. "OC/DC" - 22:55
5. "Socket" - 18:52
6. "Cornered (Duck)" - 16:15

== Personnel ==
- Tim Berne – alto saxophone
- Oscar Noriega – clarinet, bass clarinet
- Matt Mitchell – piano, Tack piano, Wurlitzer electric piano
- Ches Smith – drums, percussion, vibraphone
