= The Mystery of Compassion =

Studio album by Tom Varner
- Released: 1992
- Recorded: March 5, 6 & 7, 1992
- Genre: Jazz
- Length: 44:16
- Label: Soul Note
- Producer: Bobby Previte

Tom Varner chronology
Long Night Big Day (1991)	The Mystery of Compassion (1992)	Martian Heartache (1996)

The Mystery of Compassion is an album by American jazz French horn player and composer Tom Varner recorded in 1992 and released on the Italian Soul Note label.

== Reception ==
Professional ratings
Review scores
Source	Rating
AllMusic	4/5 stars
The Penguin Guide to Jazz Recordings	4/4 stars

The AllMusic review by Brian Olewnick awarded the album 4 stars stating "Varner's ensemble offers up fascinating music that straddles the borders between jazz and an urban mix with a root or two in noir soundtracks, world music, and who knows what else. The Mystery of Compassion is a must for fans of the jazzier edges of the downtown New York scene".

The authors of the Penguin Guide to Jazz Recordings awarded the album 4 stars, and wrote: "Varner's alarming juxtapositions make coherent sense without losing their capacity to surprise, and the players involved respond with a passionate intensity which is rare even among these driven musicians."

== Track listing ==
All compositions and arrangements by Tom Varner

1. "How Does Power Work?" - 9:32
2. "Water and Wood" - 5:56
3. "Fool's Oasis" - 8:26
4. "A Severed Arm" - 1:01
5. "The Well" - 13:52
6. "Death at the Right Time" - 7:21
7. "Control Passion" - 9:53
8. "Plunge" - 0:53
9. "$1000 Hat" - 14:15
10. "Prayer" - 3:20

- Recorded at Baby Monster Studio in New York City on March 5, 6 & 7, 1992

== Personnel ==
- Tom Varner - French horn
- Matt Darriau (track 6), Ed Jackson (tracks 1–5 & 7–9) - alto saxophone
- Ellery Eskelin (track 6), Rich Rothenberg (tracks 1–9) - tenor saxophone
- Jim Hartog - baritone saxophone (track 6)
- Steve Swell - trombone (tracks 6 & 10)
- Dave Taylor - bass trombone (tracks 6 & 10)
- Mark Feldman - violin (track 5)
- Mike Richmond - bass (tracks 1–9)
- Tom Rainey - drums (tracks 1–9)
