= Rambler (Bill Frisell album) =

Studio album by Bill Frisell
- Released: April 29, 1985
- Recorded: August 1984
- Studios: Power Station, New York City
- Genre: Post-bop
- Length: 45:22
- Label: ECM 1287
- Producer: Manfred Eicher

Bill Frisell chronology
| Theoretically (1984) | Rambler (1985) | Smash & Scatteration (1985) |

Rambler is the second album by American jazz guitarist Bill Frisell, recorded in August 1984 and released on ECM in April of the following year. The quintet features brass section Kenny Wheeler and Bob Stewart and rhythm section Jerome Harris and Paul Motian.

== Reception ==
The AllMusic review by Scott Yanow stated, "This relatively early set from Bill Frisell is a fine showcase for the utterly unique guitarist. Frisell has the ability to play nearly any extroverted style of music and his humor (check out the date's "Music I Heard") is rarely far below the surface. This particular quintet (with trumpeter Kenny Wheeler, tuba player Bob Stewart, electric bassist Jerome Harris and drummer Paul Motian) is not exactly short of original personalities and their outing (featuring seven Frisell compositions) is one of the most lively of all the ones in the ECM catalog."

Professional ratings
Review scores
| Source | Rating |
|---|---|
| AllMusic | 4.5/5 stars |
| The Penguin Guide to Jazz Recordings | 3/4 stars |

== Track listing ==
All compositions by Bill Frisell.

1. "Tone" – 8:00
2. "Music I Heard" – 4:49
3. "Rambler" – 8:20
4. "When We Go" – 5:19
5. "Resistor" – 5:49
6. "Strange Meeting" – 7:05
7. "Wizard of Odds" – 6:19

== Personnel ==
- Bill Frisell – guitar (with synthesizer)
- Kenny Wheeler – trumpet, cornet, flugelhorn
- Bob Stewart – tuba
- Jerome Harris – electric bass
- Paul Motian – drums
