= Roulette of the Cradle =

Studio album by Ingrid Laubrock
- Released: 2015
- Recorded: December 5, 2014
- Studio: System Two, Brooklyn
- Genre: Jazz
- Length: 50:29
- Label: Intakt
- Producer: Ingrid Laubrock

Ingrid Laubrock chronology
And Other Desert Towns (2014)	Roulette of the Cradle (2015)	Ubatuba (2015)

Roulette of the Cradle is an album by German jazz saxophonist Ingrid Laubrock, which was recorded in 2014 and released on the Swiss Intakt label. It was the third recording by her Anti-House quintet, the first band that she formed on her relocation to New York with guitarist Mary Halvorson, pianist Kris Davis, bassist John Hébert and drummer Tom Rainey. They are joined by clarinetist Oscar Noriega on two tracks.

== Reception ==
Professional ratings
Review scores
Source	Rating
All About Jazz	4/5 stars
AllMusic	4.5/5 stars
The Free Jazz Collective	4.5/5 stars
Jazzwise	3/5 stars

The All About Jazz review by John Sharpe states "Each cut abounds with abrupt switches in mood and tone delivered with such aplomb and invention that rather than seeming forced, the changes take on an aura of inevitability. Such richness means that there is delight to be found in close attention to the detail and each encounter reveals more of the underpinning without completely explaining the magic."

Selwyn Harris of Jazzwise noted that, in relation to the group's previous recordings, "it's clearer that Laubrock has a relationship with her band members built on trust and mutual understanding, so enabling a democratic approach to the ensemble in which no one voice speaks louder than the other." He wrote: "A mood, an anchor in the music is established before ensemble roles shift causing unpredictable changes in shape or narrative; spacey, pointillist or eerie contrapuntal contemporary chamber classical episodes can lead to something with the crashing insistence of thrash metal."

The Free Jazz Collective's Paul Acquaro commented: "The compositional approach on Roulette of the Cradle brings together the best aspects of each musician's playing... there is an arc and progression to the songs that speak to the leader's compositional prowess as much as the individual contributions."

Writing for the Chicago Reader, Peter Margasak stated that Laubrock "achieved a new apex" with the album, and remarked: "The music is exhilarating; nothing happens quite as you might expect it. Everyone in the group is a fantastic improviser, and there is plenty of extended soloing, but Laubrock's writing allows those improvisations to sprout from the performances in meticulous, composerly fashion."

In an article for JazzWord, Ken Waxman noted the "careful dynamics" and "musical interconnections" present on the album, and wrote: "the CD's defining track is 'From Farm Girl to Fabulous Vol. II', where homespun inflections, suggested by Davis' upright-piano-like woody plunks and mandolin-like strokes from the guitarist, accompany a reed transformation as Laubrock's outputs begins simply and concludes with smirking urbane and gritty urban enunciation."

Writer Raul Da Gama commented: "Pieces here are played just right, nothing is over-emoted. Compositions are carved up with introductions and epilogues and rich harmonics and rock-steady tempos through the middles... there is a rich tonality, which when suspended in mid-air literally takes my breath away. And that is why this record is a favourite of mine yesterday, today and tomorrow."

== Track listing ==
All compositions by Ingrid Laubrock

1. "That's All She Wrote" – 2:43
2. "Roulette of the Cradle" – 10:19
3. "Face the Piper, Part 1" – 3:57
4. "Face the Piper, Part 2" – 5:06
5. "Silence... (for Monika)" – 3:40
6. "...and Light (for Izumi)" – 8:02
7. "From Farm Girl to Fabulous, Vol. II" – 8:44
8. "Red Hook" – 7:51

== Personnel ==
- Ingrid Laubrock – tenor sax, soprano sax
- Mary Halvorson – guitar
- Kris Davis – piano
- John Hébert – bass
- Tom Rainey – drums
- Oscar Noriega – clarinet on 5 & 6
