= Martian Heartache =

Studio album by Tom Varner
- Released: 1997
- Recorded: March 5 & 6, 1996
- Genre: Jazz
- Length: 70:43
- Label: Soul Note
- Producer: Tom Varner

Tom Varner chronology
The Mystery of Compassion (1992)	Martian Heartache (1997)	The Window Up Above (1997)

Martian Heartache is an album by the American jazz French horn player and composer Tom Varner, recorded in 1996 and released on the Italian Soul Note label.

== Reception ==
Professional ratings
Review scores
Source	Rating
AllMusic	4.5/5 stars
The Penguin Guide to Jazz Recordings	4/4 stars

The AllMusic review by Chris Kelsey stated: "This album is one of the finest manifestations of the experimental impulse in jazz to be heard in some time".

The authors of the Penguin Guide to Jazz Recordings awarded the album 4 stars, and commented: "Sculpted with absolute precision but loose and swinging in feel, the music never turns fragmentary or episodic; even the shortest pieces are fully realized, composed and uncluttered."

Glenn Astarita, writing for All About Jazz, called the album "a poignant and multifaceted project," and stated: "Martian Heartache covers lots of territory. It is apparent that this gang was having loads of fun in the process and the entertainment factor rates a perfect 10!... The compositions have staying power and like the proverbial fine wine, get better with age. Highly Recommended!"

== Track listing ==
All compositions and arrangements by Tom Varner except as indicated

1. "Nuke 'em Tony" – 3:02
2. "Keep It Up" – 7:46
3. "Martian Affirmation" – 6:08
4. "Venus with a Syringe" – 3:45
5. "Precarious Dog" – 0:58
6. "Isaac Has a Vision on the Subway" – 6:16
7. "The Quick and the Dead" – 4:39
8. "Send Me a Probe" – 0:50
9. "Tough Luck" – 5:44
10. "Betsy Says Yes" – 1:18
11. "Eva Etc." – 10:09
12. "Anxiety All the Time" – 0:40
13. "Learn Something!" – 5:30
14. "Small Cry Big Laugh" – 11:13
15. "Lady Gay" (Traditional) – 3:24

- Recorded at Tedesco Studios in New Jersey on March 5 & 6, 1996

== Personnel ==
- Tom Varner – French horn
- Ed Jackson – alto saxophone
- Ellery Eskelin – tenor saxophone
- Drew Gress – bass
- Tom Rainey – drums
- Pete McCann – guitar (tracks 2, 5 & 11)
- Dominique Eade – vocals (track 15)
