= Drew Gress =

American jazz bassist and composer (born 1959)

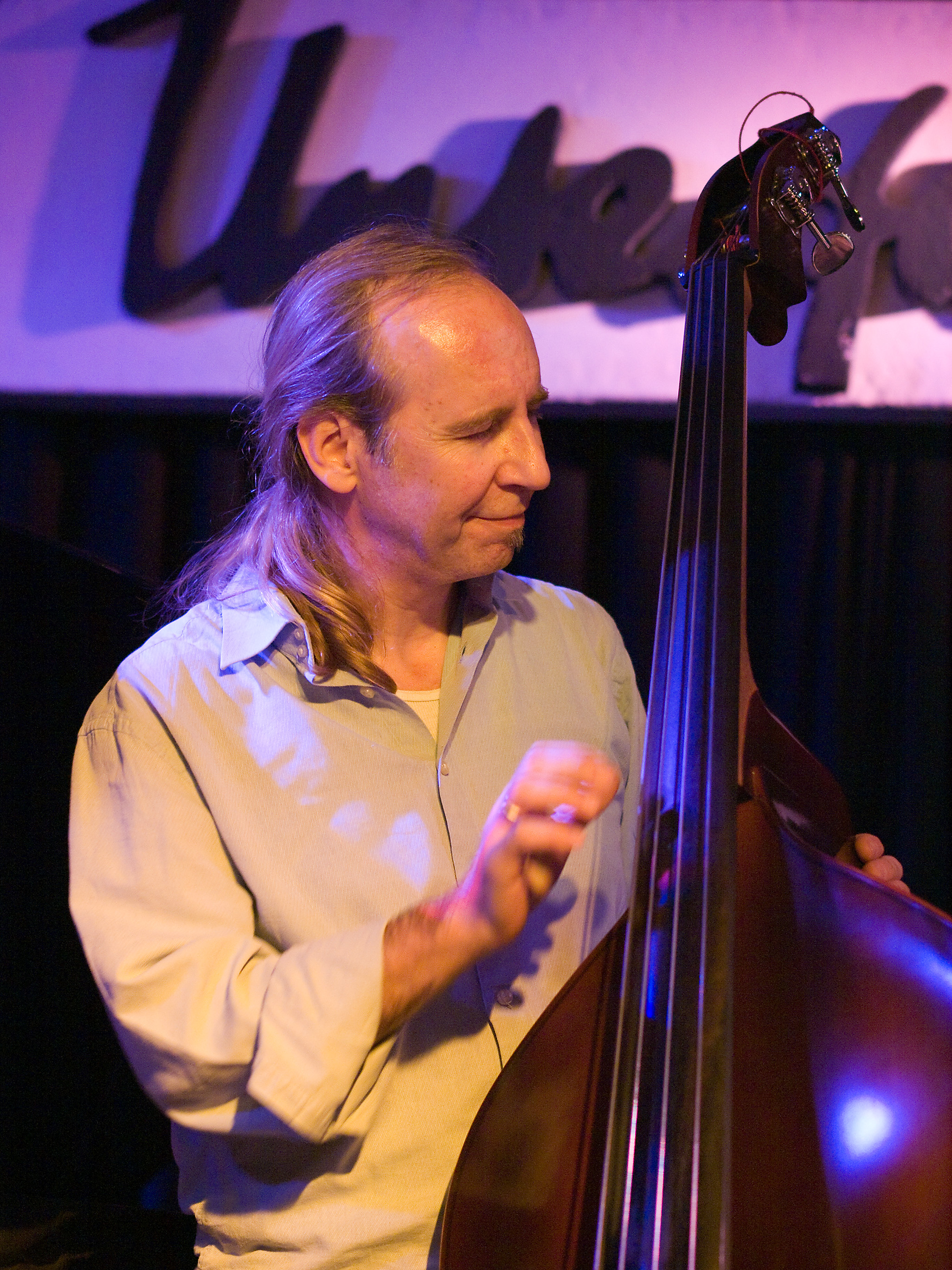
- Gress in 2010

Background information
- Born: November 20, 1959 (age 66); Trenton, New Jersey
- Genres: Jazz
- Occupation: Musician
- Instrument: Double bass
- Years active: 1980s–present
- Label: Enja
- Website: drewgress.com

Drew Gress (born November 20, 1959) is an American jazz double-bassist and composer born in Trenton, New Jersey and raised in the Philadelphia area.

== Biography ==
Gress studied at Towson State University and Manhattan School of Music. In the late 1980s he worked with Phil Haynes, recording several albums with the group Joint Venture.

In 1998, he released his first album as leader, Heyday, with his band Jagged Sky (featuring David Binney, Ben Monder, and Kenny Wollesen). Gress wrote all except two of the compositions. Two years later, he recorded Spin & Drift, on which he also played steel guitar. He recorded material for two further albums – 7 Black Butterflies and The Irrational Numbers – in 2004.

Gress has taught at Peabody Conservatory and Western Connecticut State University. He has also served tenures as artist in residence at University of Colorado-Boulder and at Russia's St. Petersburg Conservatory.

Gress has toured Europe, Asia, and South America. Those with whom he has and continues to work include Tim Berne, Uri Caine, Fred Hersch, Don Byron, Dave Douglas, and Erik Friedlander.

Critic John Fordham described a performance by Gress's group as "one of the great jazz performances in Britain in 2002". In 2004, the UK's BBC Radio and London's Guardian selected his quartet's live radio broadcast as Jazz Concert of the Year.

Composition awards include an NEA grant (1990), funding from Meet the Composer (2003).

== Playing and composing style ==
The DownBeat reviewer of Vesper, a collaboration between Gress and the trio expEAR, wrote that the bassist "has exquisite time and a composer's sense of line, a combination that allows him an insightful level of counterpoint in his playing". The DownBeat reviewer of Gress's The Sky inside wrote that he "favors a focused restraint, a sort of concentrated tension that wrings the maximum inspiration from minimal elements, and which maintains a taut severity even when spare free passages burst into angular swing".

== Discography ==
=== As leader ===
- Heyday (as Drew Gress's Jagged Sky) (Soul Note, 1998)
- Spin & Drift (Premonition, 2001)
- 7 Black Butterflies (Premonition, 2005)
- The Irrational Numbers (Premonition, 2008)
- And Again with Shims Trio (Deepdig, 2012)
- The Sky Inside (Pirouet, 2013)

=== As sideman ===
With John Abercrombie

- Within a Song (ECM, 2012)
- 39 Steps (ECM, 2013)
- Up and Coming (ECM, 2017)

With Tim Berne

- Visitation Rites (Screwgun, 1997)
- Please Advise (Screwgun, 1999)
- Pre-Emptive Denial (Screwgun, 2005)

With Uri Caine

- Wagner e Venezia (Winter & Winter, 1997)
- The Goldberg Variations (Winter & Winter, 2000)
- Uri Caine Ensemble Plays Mozart (Winter & Winter, 2006)

With Yelena Eckemoff

- In the Shadow of a Cloud (L&H, 2017)
- Better Than Gold and Silver (L&H, 2018)
- I Am a Stranger in This World (L&H, 2022)

With Fred Hersch

- Dancing in the Dark (Chesky, 1993)
- Plays ... (Chesky, 1994)
- Point in Time (Enja, 1995)
- Passion Flower: The Music of Billy Strayhorn (Nonesuch, 1996)
- The Duo Album (Classical Action, 1997)
- Live at the Village Vanguard (Palmetto, 2002)
- Trio + 2 (Palmetto, 2004)
- Night & the Music (Palmetto, 2007)
- '97 @ The Village Vanguard (Palmetto, 2018)
- Breath by Breath (Palmetto, 2022)
- The Surrounding Green (ECM, 2025)

With Joint Venture

- Joint Venture (Enja, 1987)
- Ways (Enja, 1989)
- Mirrors (Enja, 1994)

With Kenny Werner

- Beauty Secrets (RCA/BMG, 1999)

With others

- Ralph Alessi, Baida (ECM, 2013)
- Ray Anderson, Big Band Record (Gramavision, 1994)
- Lynne Arriale, With Words Unspoken (DMP, 1996)
- Jon Ballantyne, The Loose (Justin Time, 1994)
- Don Byron, Romance with the Unseen (Blue Note, 1999)
- Marc Copland, Night Whispers (Pirouet, 2009)
- Marc Copland, Better by Far (InnerVoice, 2017)
- Dave Douglas, Five (Soul Note, 1996)
- Dave Douglas, Convergence (Soul Note, 1999)
- Ellery Eskelin, Setting the Standard (Cadence, 1989)
- Erik Friedlander, Chimera (Avant, 1995
- Erik Friedlander, The Watchman (Tzadik, 1996)
- David Kane, Machinery of the Night (Magellan, 2006)
- Tony Malaby, Apparations (Songlines, 2003)
- Liam Noble, Romance Among the Fishes (Basho, 2005)
- Jason Robinson, Tiresian Symmetry (Cuneiform, 2012)
- Samo Salamon, Almost Almond (Sanje, 2011)
- John Surman, Brewster's Rooster (ECM, 2007)
- Tom Varner, Martian Heartache (Soul Note, 1996)
