= You've Been Watching Me =

Studio album by Tim Berne's Snakeoil
- Released: 17 April 2015
- Recorded: December 2014
- Studios: The Clubhouse, Rhinebeck, NY
- Genre: Jazz
- Length: 67:33
- Labels: ECM; ECM 2443
- Producer: David Torn

Tim Berne chronology
| Shadow Man (2013) | You've Been Watching Me (2015) | Incidentals (2017) |

You've Been Watching Me is an album by the American composer and saxophonist Tim Berne's Snakoil which was released on the ECM label in 2015.

== Reception ==
Professional ratings
Review scores
| Source | Rating |
|---|---|
| Allmusic | 4/5 stars |
| The Guardian | 4/5 stars |
| All About Jazz | 5/5 stars |

The Allmusic review by Thom Jurek awarded the album 4 stars and stated "You've Been Watching Me is the most structured record from Snakeoil as well as the most varied. The band's language has expanded with the addition of Ferreira, yet it's more intuitive -- where the space and complexity are different shades in the face of beauty".

Writing in The Guardian, John Fordham commented "The original alto sax, clarinets, piano and drums now expands to include the subtle and cinematic Ryan Ferreira’s guitar. Though this is the most collectivised edition of Snakeoil, a wealth of fascinating detail remains ... Some Berne followers might find the sense of being lost within his tightening mazes increases with this more collective venture, but DownBeat magazine nailed Berne’s current music by declaring that it “rocks and thinks, explores, deconstructs and, yes, it swings”".

The All About Jazz review by Karl Ackermann said that "You've Been Watching Me represents another forward-looking development for Berne and Snakeoil. The quintet works in various breakout formations adding to the variety of textures and sounds. There's an openness in this setting that adds depth and drama to the improvisations that weave through the arrangements. Berne's music has never been anything less than challenging, but here it is broader and more accessible without sacrificing edginess; You've Been Watching Me is a major achievement in Berne's portfolio".

JazzTimes reviewer Mike Shanley wrote "Snakeoil’s third album finds Berne continuing to assert his intense writing style under the ECM banner, with guitarist/collaborator David Torn handling the production for a second time and maintaining the saxophonist’s personality ... Previous Berne groups have focused on acoustic frenzy (Bloodcount) and dabbled in noisy electric structures (Science Friction). Snakeoil is poised to be his strongest band yet, because it combines those qualities".

== Track listing ==
All compositions by Tim Berne

1. "Lost in Redding" – 6:58
2. "Small World in a Small Town" – 18:26
3. "Embraceable Me" – 14:12
4. "Angles" – 2:26
5. "You've Been Watching Me" – 1:46
6. "Semi Self Detached" – 10:23
7. "False Impressions" – 13:22

== Personnel ==
- Tim Berne - alto saxophone
- Oscar Noriega - clarinet, bass clarinet
- Ryan Ferreira – electric guitar, acoustic guitar
- Matt Mitchell - piano, electronics
- Ches Smith - drums, percussion
