= Feign (album) =

Live album by Tim Berne's Hard Cell
- Released: 2005
- Recorded: May 12 & 13, 2005; Rheinbeck
- Genre: Jazz
- Length: 51:06
- Label: Screwgun; SC 70015
- Producer: Tim Berne

Tim Berne chronology
Electric and Acoustic Hard Cell Live (2004)	Feign (2005)	Pre-Emptive Denial (2005)

Feign is a studio album by saxophonist Tim Berne's Hard Cell which was recorded in 2005 at The Clubhouse Recording Studio and released on Berne's Screwgun label.

== Reception ==
Professional ratings
Review scores
Source	Rating
AllMusic	4/5 stars
The Guardian	4/5 stars
The Penguin Guide to Jazz Recordings	3.5/4 stars

The AllMusic review awarded the album 4½ stars stating "Feign is a blast of energized modern creative music, free improvisation corralled into appealing structures, and even moments of unexpected lyricism and beauty. It is 100 percent Tim Berne at his best, brought to full realization along with long-term collaborator Rainey and that relatively new kid on the Brooklyn block, Craig Taborn, who demonstrates without a doubt that he has become a full-fledged resident of Berne's musical neighborhood".

Writing in The Guardian, John Fordham called it a "fiercely focused set, in which Berne's bowstring-tight structures frame the music without restricting the improvising".

The All About Jazz review by John Kelman said that "Feign is the perfect introduction to Berne for newcomers. For already committed fans, it's a lighter but equally compelling continuation of his ongoing evolution".

The JazzTimes review by Thomas Conrad said "it is exactly the right sonic companion for certain moods--say, evenings when one recoils from emotional subjectivity and craves unadorned mineral (as opposed to animal or vegetable) truth. Berne configures intricate aural designs with the integrity of constant creative pressure and (despite the high output) few wasted notes".

== Track listing ==
All compositions by Tim Berne

1. "I Do It (For Brookti)" - 3:40
2. "Time Laugh" - 9:10
3. "Brokelyn" - 8:15
4. "Mechanicals Failure" - 6:34
5. "My First Phone" - 8:25
6. "BG....Uh....OH" - 4:21
7. "I Thought You Had It" - 7:55
8. "Pan/Ex" - 2:46

== Personnel ==
- Tim Berne - alto saxophone
- Craig Taborn - piano
- Tom Rainey - drums
