= Poisoned Minds: The Paris Concert =

Live album by Tim Berne's Bloodcount
- Released: 1995
- Recorded: September 22–25, 1994
- Venue: Instants Chavirés, Montreuil, Paris, France
- Genre: Jazz
- Length: 69:03
- Label: JMT; JMT 514 020
- Producer: Stefan F. Winter

Tim Berne chronology
Lowlife: The Paris Concert (1995)	Poisoned Minds: The Paris Concert (1995)	Memory Select: The Paris Concert (1995)

Poisoned Minds: The Paris Concert is a live album by saxophonist Tim Berne's Bloodcount and second volume of the series which was recorded in 1994 and released on the JMT label.

== Reception ==
The AllMusic review by Dave Lynch said "Poisoned Minds is for serious listeners without attenuated attention spans, a somewhat radical concept in itself. Yet aside from the lengths of the pieces, many elements of the music are not particularly radical despite Berne's avant-garde rep -- melody, rhythm, and theme are all important to the saxophonist, and the innovation comes from the way he manipulates structure, fitting the pieces of the puzzle together in unpredictable ways".

Professional ratings
Review scores
Source	Rating
AllMusic	4.5/5 stars
The Penguin Guide to Jazz Recordings	3.5/4 stars

== Track listing ==
All compositions by Tim Berne

1. "The Other" - 27:35
2. "What Are the Odds? Speed/J.B.'s Stove/A Slight Discrepancy in the Figures" - 41:28

== Personnel ==
- Tim Berne - alto saxophone, baritone saxophone
- Chris Speed - tenor saxophone, clarinet
- Marc Ducret - electric guitar
- Michael Formanek - contrabass
- Jim Black - drums
