= Visitation Rites =

Live album by Tim Berne's Paraphrase
- Released: 1997
- Recorded: 1996; Berlin, Germany
- Genre: Jazz
- Length: 73:55
- Label: Screwgun; SCREWU 70002
- Producer: Tim Berne

Tim Berne chronology
Big Satan (1997)	Visitation Rites (1997)	Discretion (1997)

Visitation Rites is a live album by saxophonist Tim Berne's Paraphrase which was recorded in Germany in 1996 and released on Berne's Screwgun label.

== Reception ==
The AllMusic review awarded the album 4 stars. In Jazziz, Steve Dollar wrote "The music burns but it also makes sense. Juggling alto and baritone saxophones, Berne zooms between incandescent bits of overblowing and tenderly articulated phrases, upper-register soul crys and thunderclap bursts of notes, while sustaining both formidable drive and cliche-free logic".

Professional ratings
Review scores
Source	Rating
AllMusic	4/5 stars
The Penguin Guide to Jazz Recordings	3.5/4 stars

== Track listing ==
1. "Poetic License" (Tom Rainey) – 19:59
2. "Piano Justice" (Tim Berne) – 30:41
3. "I Can't Wait 'Till Tomorrow" (Drew Gress) – 23:10

== Personnel ==
- Tim Berne – alto saxophone, baritone saxophone
- Drew Gress – bass
- Tom Rainey – drums
