= Seconds (Tim Berne album) =

Live album by Tim Berne's Bloodcount
- Released: 2007
- Recorded: 1994 (DVD) and 1997; The Middle of Somewhere (Disc 1), Paris, France (Disc 2: DVD) and the Children of the Corn Festival (Disc 3)
- Genre: Jazz
- Label: Screwgun; SC 70019
- Producer: Tim Berne

Tim Berne chronology
Livein Cognito (2006)	Seconds (2007)	(Duck) (2008)

Seconds is a live 2-CD set by saxophonist Tim Berne's Bloodcount which was recorded in 1997 and packaged along with a documentary DVD which was recorded in 1994 and released on Berne's Screwgun label.

== Reception ==
Professional ratings
Review scores
Source	Rating
All About Jazz	4.5/5 stars

Writing for All About Jazz, John Kelman stated "With two CDs of largely unheard Bloodcount material and a DVD that's as engaging as it is enlightening, Seconds is a valuable addition to the Bloodcount discography, further proof of just how important that group was for everyone involved". On the same site Sean Patrick Fitzell observed "Hardly leftovers, the package boasts previously unavailable original compositions and the type of bristling performances that forged the band's reputation".

== Track listing ==
All compositions by Tim Berne

Disc One: Live in the Middle of Somewhere 1997

1. "Scrap Metal" - 11:48
2. "Yes, Dear" - 21:13
3. "Mr. Johnson" - 25:42

Disc Two (DVD): Eyenoises... The Paris Movie 1994

1. "Eyecontact" - 51:20

Disc Three: Live At The Children Of The Corn Festival 1997

1. "Sense and Sinsemilla" - 13:41
2. "Screwgun" - 11:25
3. "Byram's World" - 15:51
4. "Yes, Dear" - 19:49
5. "Howmuch Longer" - 12:05

== Personnel ==
- Tim Berne - alto saxophone
- Chris Speed - tenor saxophone
- Michael Formanek - contrabass
- Jim Black - drums
- Marc Ducret - guitar (Disc Two (DVD) only)
