= Big Satan (album) =

Live album by Tim Berne, Marc Ducret and Tom Rainey
- Released: 1997
- Recorded: February 8–10, 1996; Instants Chavirés, Montreuil, Paris, France
- Genre: Jazz
- Length: 69:30
- Label: Winter & Winter; 910 005-2
- Producer: Stefan Winter

Tim Berne chronology
| Unwound (1996) | Big Satan (1997) | Visitation Rites (1997) |

Big Satan (also referred to as I Think They Liked It Honey) is a live album by saxophonist Tim Berne's Big Satan which was recorded in 1996 and released on the Winter & Winter label.

== Reception ==
The AllMusic review by Glenn Astarita said, "The band explores various methods of expounding upon a story line via Berne and Ducret's shredding lines and implosive mode of execution, while Rainey anchors the proceedings with loosely based polyrhythms and sweeping fills. Here, the musicians straddle the outside while also providing supplementary insight into familiar musical territories. (Strongly recommended.)"

Professional ratings
Review scores
| Source | Rating |
|---|---|
| AllMusic | 4.5/5 stars |
| The Penguin Guide to Jazz Recordings | 3/4 stars |

== Track listing ==
All compositions by Tim Berne except as indicated

1. "Bobby Raconte une Histore" (Marc Ducret) - 11:36
2. "Dialectes" (Ducret) - 15:24
3. "The 12½% Solution" - 10:46
4. "Scrap Metal" - 8:44
5. "Yes, Dear" - 14:08
6. "Description du Tunnel" (Ducret) - 16:19

== Personnel ==
- Tim Berne - alto saxophone, baritone saxophone
- Marc Ducret - electric guitar
- Tom Rainey - drums
