= Shell Game (short story) =

1954 short story by Philip K. Dick

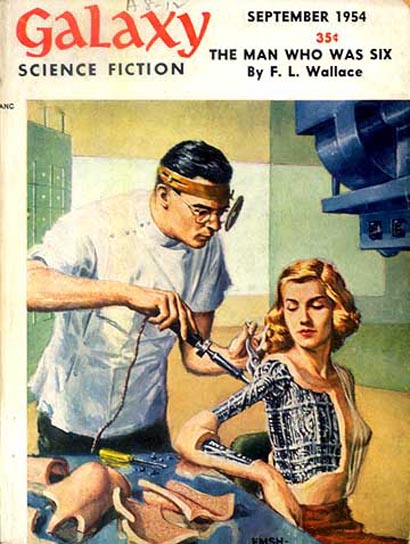
"Shell Game" was originally published in the September 1954 issue of Galaxy Science Fiction.

"Shell Game" is a science fiction short story by American writer Philip K. Dick. It was submitted to the Scott Meredith Literary Agency and received by SMLA on December 12, 1953. It was published in Galaxy Science Fiction in September 1954.

== Plot summary ==
A group of paranoid mental patients, long stranded on an alien planet by the shipwreck of the robot-controlled hospital spaceship transporting them to a mental hospital, believe themselves to be constantly under attack by aliens or other humans. They discover the damaged ship in a bog, and from recorded tapes, they learn of their condition and the circumstances of the shipwreck. Even when they discover this evidence of the truth and attempt to verify or disprove the information on the ship's tapes, they construct sophisticated explanations of why the attacks are real despite contrary evidence. After much internal dispute, and sometimes violent conflict, at the end of the story, the survivors of the infighting are still unsure whether they are paranoid or victims of a plot. As one of them states, they are like a group of rulers which are all either 12 or 13 inches long, so they have no basis for comparison. The central question of this story is how would people determine whether their judgments are reasonable or unreasonably paranoid when they agree they have evidence that either all or none of them are, in fact, paranoid.

This story was later expanded in the novel Clans of the Alphane Moon.

== Collection appearances ==
"Shell Game" appears in the following Philip K. Dick collections:

- The Book of Philip K. Dick (1973)
- The Collected Stories of Philip K. Dick, Vol. 3: The Father-Thing (1987)
- The Philip K. Dick Reader (1997)
