= Discretion (album) =

Live album by Tim Berne's Bloodcount
- Released: 1997
- Recorded: 1997; Grinnell, Iowa (tracks 3–5), New York (track 2) and Munich (track 1)
- Genre: Jazz
- Length: 73:39
- Label: Screwgun; SC 70003
- Producer: Tim Berne

Tim Berne chronology
Visitation Rites (1997)	Discretion (1997)	Saturation Point (1997)

Discretion is a live album by saxophonist Tim Berne's Bloodcount which was recorded in 1997 and released on Berne's Screwgun label.

== Reception ==
The AllMusic review by Joslyn Layne said "The musicians are brilliantly creative and experienced enough not to get lost in all the room provided by these large time frames. Each player has boundless creative energy, matched only by technical ability-- they never seem to tire, only to get more worked up and inspired. In the always-live recordings, Bloodcount constantly morph and shape-shift musical ideas, and keep the compositions breathing through exploitation of the whole range of dynamics... so even if some of the songs on Discretion are familiar, it's guaranteed to be a new listening experience".

Professional ratings
Review scores
Source	Rating
AllMusic	4.5/5 stars

== Track listing ==
All compositions by Tim Berne

1. "Is That a Gap?" - 14:53
2. "The Opener" - 14:10
3. "Talk Dirty to Me" - 10:20
4. "Eye Are Us" - 18:05
5. "Byram's World" - 16:15

== Personnel ==
- Tim Berne - alto saxophone, baritone saxophone
- Chris Speed - tenor saxophone, clarinet
- Michael Formanek - contrabass
- Jim Black - drums
