= The Shell Game (album) =

Studio album by Tim Berne
- Released: March 20, 2001
- Recorded: 2001
- Genre: Jazz
- Length: 66:42
- Label: Thirsty Ear; THI 57099.2
- Producer: David Torn

Tim Berne chronology
Auto da Fe (2000)	The Shell Game (2001)	Open, Coma (2001)

The Shell Game is an album by alto saxophonist Tim Berne featuring keyboardist Craig Taborn and drummer Tom Rainey which was recorded in 2000 at the Make Believe Ballroom in New York and released in 2001 on the Thirsty Ear label.

== Reception ==
Professional ratings
Review scores
Source	Rating
AllMusic	4/5 stars
The Guardian	4/5 stars
The Austin Chronicle	3.5/5 stars
The Penguin Guide to Jazz Recordings	3.5/4 stars

The AllMusic review awarded the album 4 stars stating "The Shell Game shines forth as a charismatic effort from a preeminent stylist who is willing to take risks". The Guardian's John Fordham rated the album 4 stars out of 5, saying, "The work of New York saxophonist/composer Tim Berne can sometimes be almost forbiddingly rugged and demanding, but the coherence on this session, and the assertiveness mixed with an unfamiliar mellowness in his tone, amount to a new level of inventiveness and confidence for him". The Austin Chronicle's Michael Chamy noted "The Shell Game plays like an epic novel, full of unexpected twists and turns, ultimately rewarding the repeat listener with a powerful cocktail, equal parts inspiration and intrigue". The All About Jazz review said that "The Shell Game ranks with Berne's best work. It presents a wide variety of textures and moods. At times the trio pursues deceptively straightforward progressions; at others it takes them apart to the very last nuance—and when you least expect it, they break free into exciting groove-driven jams. The only fault one might find with this record is that Berne's playing can sometimes be painfully relentless, because he seems to have a very high threshold [sic] for tension. But that's a minor criticism relative to what otherwise is a surprisingly inventive and creatively resonant recording". Writing in JazzTimes Daniel Piotrowski noted "Berne sticks to the modus operandi of his recent bands: long, meandering pieces with structured melodies making recurring, intermittent appearances. More so than in Berne's other bands, his sidemen are here mostly for texture and support rather than complete integration. In return, Taborn and Rainey create a lot of space for Berne to solo in as much as he likes-and he does at marathon lengths during the four drawn-out pieces".

== Track listing ==
All compositions by Tim Berne

1. "Hard Cell (for Tom)" - 9:26
2. "Twisted/Straight Jacket" - 21:07
3. "Heavy Mental (for Wayne Krantz)" - 6:28
4. "Thin Ice" - 29:41

== Personnel ==
- Tim Berne - alto saxophone
- Craig Taborn - keyboards, electronics
- Tom Rainey - drums
