= Open, Coma =

2001 studio album / live album by Tim Berne and the Copenhagen Art Ensemble

Studio album / Live album by Tim Berne and the Copenhagen Art Ensemble with Herb Robertson and Marc Ducret
- Released: 2001
- Recorded: September 16 & 17, 2000; Copenhagen Jazzhouse, Denmark and Sveriges Radio Studio 7, Malmö, Sweden
- Genre: Jazz
- Length: 208:03
- Label: Screwgun; SCR 70012
- Producer: Tim Berne

Tim Berne chronology
The Shell Game (2001)	Open, Coma (2001)	The Sevens (2002)

Open, Coma is a double album by saxophonist Tim Berne and the Copenhagen Art Ensemble with Herb Robertson and Marc Ducret which was recorded in 2000 in Denmark and Sweden and released on Berne's Screwgun label.

== Reception ==
Professional ratings
Review scores
Source	Rating
AllMusic	4.5/5 stars
Pitchfork Media	8.9
The Penguin Guide to Jazz Recordings	3.5/4 stars

The AllMusic review awarded the album 4½ stars stating "With its episodes of artful skronk lurking about, Open, Coma remains an uncompromising recording best suited for adventurous ears. But with its kaleidoscopic palette of colors and electric charge and groove conjuring up thoughts of Gil and Miles, this may be one of the best places for the uninitiated to begin investigating the world of Tim Berne". Pitchfork's Chris Dahlen said "it's no surprise that for all the colors and nuances of Berne's and conductor Ture Larsen's arrangements, this band is primarily an instrument of force. The great Basie and Ellington orchestras could get just as raucous, but they also had elements of swing and "cool" that Berne has mostly dispensed with. At turns rowdy, gorgeous, and frantically overstimulating, it's an exciting performance of Berne's catchy and intricate writing." The All About Jazz review said that "In many ways Open, Coma represents a new approach for Tim Berne. Never one to get too comfortable in any given place, he's taken a risk here by blowing up the size of the group and opening up its sound substantially. It pays off".

== Track listing ==
All compositions by Tim Berne

Disc One:

1. "Open, Coma" - 27:47
2. "Eye Contact" - 45:57

Disc Two:

1. "The Legend of P-1" - 32:48
2. "Impacted Wisdom" - 41:31

== Personnel ==
- Tim Berne - alto saxophone
- Marc Ducret - guitar
- Herb Robertson - trumpet

Copenhagen Art Ensemble

- Lotte Anker - soprano saxophone, tenor saxophone
- Thomas Agergaard - tenor saxophone, flute
- Peter Fuglsang - clarinet, bass clarinet
- Lars Vissing - trumpet
- Kasper Tranberg - cornet
- Mads Hyhne - trombone
- Klaus Löhrer - bass trombone, tuba
- Thomas Clausen - piano, Fender Rhodes
- Nils Davisen - bass
- Anders Mogensen - drums
- Ture Larsen - conductor
