= In Line (album) =

Studio album by Bill Frisell
- Released: 1983
- Recorded: August 1982
- Studio: Talent Studio; Oslo, Norway
- Genre: Post-bop
- Length: 42:22
- Label: ECM; ECM 1241
- Producer: Manfred Eicher

Bill Frisell chronology
In Line (1983)	Theoretically (1984)

Original LP Cover

In Line is the debut album by American jazz guitarist Bill Frisell, recorded in August 1982 and released on ECM Records the following year. It contains four solo performances by Frisell and five duets with bassist Arild Andersen.

== Reception ==
Professional ratings
Review scores
Source	Rating
AllMusic	3/5 stars
The Encyclopedia of Popular Music	3/5 stars
MusicHound Rock: The Essential Album Guide	3/5 stars
The Penguin Guide to Jazz Recordings	3/4 stars
The Rolling Stone Album Guide	4/5 stars

The Rolling Stone Album Guide called the album "a lusciously reflective collection".

Jon Solomon

== Track listing ==
All tracks are written by Bill Frisell.

Side one
No.	Title	Length
1.	"Start"	5:55
2.	"Throughout"	6:52
3.	"Two Arms"	4:00
4.	"Shorts"	3:08
5.	"Smile on You"	4:07

Side two
No.	Title	Length
1.	"The Beach"	6:06
2.	"In Line"	4:36
3.	"Three"	4:17
4.	"Godson Song"	3:57

== Personnel ==
- Bill Frisell – guitar
- Arild Andersen – bass (tracks 1, 4, 6, 8 & 9)
