= Saturation Point (album) =

Live album by Tim Berne's Bloodcount
- Released: 1997
- Recorded: 1997; St. Louis, Missouri
- Genre: Jazz
- Length: 52:47
- Labels: Screwgun; SC 70004
- Producer: Tim Berne

Tim Berne chronology
Discretion (1997)	Saturation Point (1997)	Ornery People (1998)

Saturation Point is a live album by saxophonist Tim Berne's Bloodcount which was recorded in 1997 and released on Berne's Screwgun label.

== Reception ==
The AllMusic review by William York said "the album is every bit as strong as the group's earlier releases. What's more, the sound quality exceeds that of Bloodcount's other live Screwgun albums, and the performances, while still longer than ten minutes in each case, are a bit more concise than before... Berne's horn playing sounds especially ornery on this album, including some painful shrieks and scrapes that aren't usually part of his style. However, even taking this slight reservation (if one can call it that) into account, Saturation Point is recommendable to anyone interested in Berne's music and especially the Bloodcount quartet".

Professional ratings
Review scores
Source	Rating
AllMusic	4/5 stars
The Penguin Guide to Jazz Recordings	3/4 stars

== Track listing ==
All compositions by Tim Berne

1. "Is That a Gap?" - 13:17
2. "Screwgun" - 10:26
3. "Snow White" - 14:24
4. "The Opener" - 14:38

== Personnel ==
- Tim Berne - alto saxophone, baritone saxophone
- Chris Speed - tenor saxophone, clarinet
- Michael Formanek - contrabass
- Jim Black - drums
