= The Great Satan (Trivax album) =

Studio album by Trivax
- Released: 30 May 2025
- Recorded: August 2024
- Studio: Ritual Sound, North Yorkshire; Priory Recording Studios, Birmingham
- Genre: Black metal
- Length: 42:28
- Label: Osmose
- Producer: Samuel Turbit

Trivax chronology
Eloah Burns Out (2023)	The Great Satan (2025)

Singles from The Great Satan
- 1. "Operation Ramadhan" Released: 29 April 2025; 2. "Here Comes the Flood" Released: 19 May 2025

The Great Satan is the third studio album by UK-based Iranian metal band, Trivax. It was released on 30 May 2025, through Osmose Productions, in LP, CD and digital formats.

== Background ==
Consisting of nine tracks with a total runtime of approximately forty-two minutes, the album was noted as encompassing elements of death, black and thrash metal, and incorporating influences of goth and acoustic Eastern instrumentation. It addresses religious radicalism in Iran and the Iranian Revolution's involvement in the country's retreat from progressivism. The album's cover art depicts Ruhollah Khomeini, the Supreme Leader of Iran in 1979. The Great Satan was recorded and engineered by Greg Chandler at Priory Recording Studios in Sutton Coldfield, (Note: Adapted from Bandcamp.) and produced, mixed and mastered by Samuel Turbit at Ritual Sound in North Yorkshire. The first single of the album, "Operation Ramadhan", was released on 29 April 2025. It was followed by the second single, "Here Comes the Flood", on 19 May 2025. (Note: Adapted from Spotify.)

== Reception ==
Professional ratings
Review scores
Source	Rating
Blabbermouth	8/10 stars
Metal Hammer	8/10 stars

Blabbermouth described the album as "a fierce celebration of freedom and spits in the face of theocratic lunacy," and "fearless, dynamic and elaborate, captured by a crystal clear, crisp production," rating it eight out of ten. Perran Helyes of Metal Hammer assigned it a rating of eight, describing energy exhibited on the album as "overwhelmingly an empowering fist in the face of oppression and a defiant declaration of freedom."

== Track listing ==
The Great Satan track listing
No.	Title	Length
1.	"Atash"	2:58
2.	"To Liberation and Beyond"	5:01
3.	"Lawless Eternal..."	3:48
4.	"Here Comes the Flood"	6:32
5.	"The Great Satan"	3:34
6.	"Daemon's Melancholie"	7:13
7.	"Ya Saheb Az Zaman"	1:05
8.	"Operation Ramadan"	8:17
9.	"Tamam Shod"	4:00
Total length:		42:28

== Personnel ==
Credits for The Great Satan adapted from Bandcamp.

- Shayan – lead vocals, guitars, baglama, oud
- Sully – bass, backing vocals
- Matt – drums
- Vickie Harley – operatic vocals (tracks 5, 7, 8)
- Mother – lead vocals, lyrics (track 5)
- Greg Chandler – engineering, recording
- Samuel Turbit – producer, mixing, mastering
- Nestor Avalos – artwork
- NecrosHorns – photography
