= Incidentals (album) =

Studio album by Tim Berne's Snakeoil
- Released: August 25, 2017
- Recorded: December 2014
- Studio: The Clubhouse; Rhinebeck, New York
- Genre: Jazz
- Length: 64:06
- Label: ECM; ECM 2579
- Producer: David Torn

Tim Berne chronology
You've Been Watching Me (2015)	Incidentals (2017)

Incidentals is an album by Tim Berne's Snakeoil recorded in December 2014 and released on ECM August 25, 2017—the band's fourth album for the label.

== Reception ==
Professional ratings
Review scores
Source	Rating
Allmusic	4/5 stars
The Guardian	4/5 stars
All About Jazz	4/5 stars
All About Jazz	4/5 stars

The AllMusic review by Thom Jurek awarded the album 4 stars, stating, "this five-track set offers what is by now an unmistakable sound, with Berne's constantly interweaving scripted melodies, modes, and dialogues seamlessly wedded to group improvisation. When combined, they create not only a musical signature, but a shared language."

Writing in The Guardian, John Fordham commented "This fourth Snakeoil album for ECM is one of the most viscerally direct and exciting chapters in a consistently creative story."

The All About Jazz review by Karl Ackermann said that "Long ago surpassing his mentor Julius Hemphill, Berne has been furthering the late saxophonist's technique and taking his own compositional skills to progressively higher levels. In Snakeoil he has found a perfect formation, where traditional solos are minimized and group dynamics dictate the sound. Just as could be said with each preceding Snakeoil release, Incidentals is the group's best release to date" while Mark Sullivan stated "The integration of composition and improvisation typical of Berne's work is especially pronounced in this program."

The JazzTimes review by Lloyd Sachs observed "Among its many rewards, Incidentals documents the growth of the exciting partnership between Berne and Mitchell. ... he relates to the leader through the heady way he embroiders open spaces, enhances the album’s pervasive classical imprint, intensifies the architecture of certain tunes and subtly colors the aural landscape with electronic touches."

== Track listing ==
All tracks are written by Tim Berne, except as noted.

No.	Title	Writer(s)	Length
1.	"Hora feliz"		10:26
2.	"Stingray Shuffle"		7:36
3.	"Sideshow"		26:01
4.	"Incidentals Contact"		10:47
5.	"Prelude One / Sequel Too"	Matt Mitchell, Berne / Berne	9:17

== Personnel ==
=== Snakeoil ===
- Tim Berne – alto saxophone
- Ryan Ferreira – electric guitar
- Oscar Noriega – clarinet, bass clarinet
- Matt Mitchell – piano, electronics
- Ches Smith – drums, vibraphone, percussion, timpani

=== Guest musician ===
- David Torn – guitar (tracks 1 [Intro] and 3 [Outro])
