= Big Satan =

American jazz ensemble

Big Satan is an American jazz ensemble headed by composer and alto saxophonist Tim Berne, featuring drummer Tom Rainey and electric guitarist Marc Ducret. Rainey and Ducret are regular Berne collaborators, and both contribute compositions as well.

== History ==
The group released its live self-titled debut (also called I Think They Liked It Honey) in 1997, described by Allmusic as "a truly mesmerizing set that rings with ominous overtones and intricately constructed fabrics of sound".

It would be 2004 before the group's second album, Souls Saved Hear, was finally released. Described as "dazzling" by Allmusic, it was also praised by the BBC. PopMatters described it as "an adventurous listen for the most discriminating, open-minded listener".

An interview with Berne along with a live set from The Vortex Jazz Club in London was broadcast by BBC Radio 3.

Their style of music can be described as avant garde jazz. Adopting elements from the styles of many previous “out-jazz” originators (like Sun Ra, Ornette Coleman, et al.), Big Satan's sound is aggressive but not without a sense of humor.

== Discography ==
- Big Satan (Winter & Winter, 1997)
- Souls Saved Hear (Thirsty Ear, 2004)
- Livein Cognito (Screwgun, 2006)
