= Tim Berne =

American jazz saxophonist (born 1954)

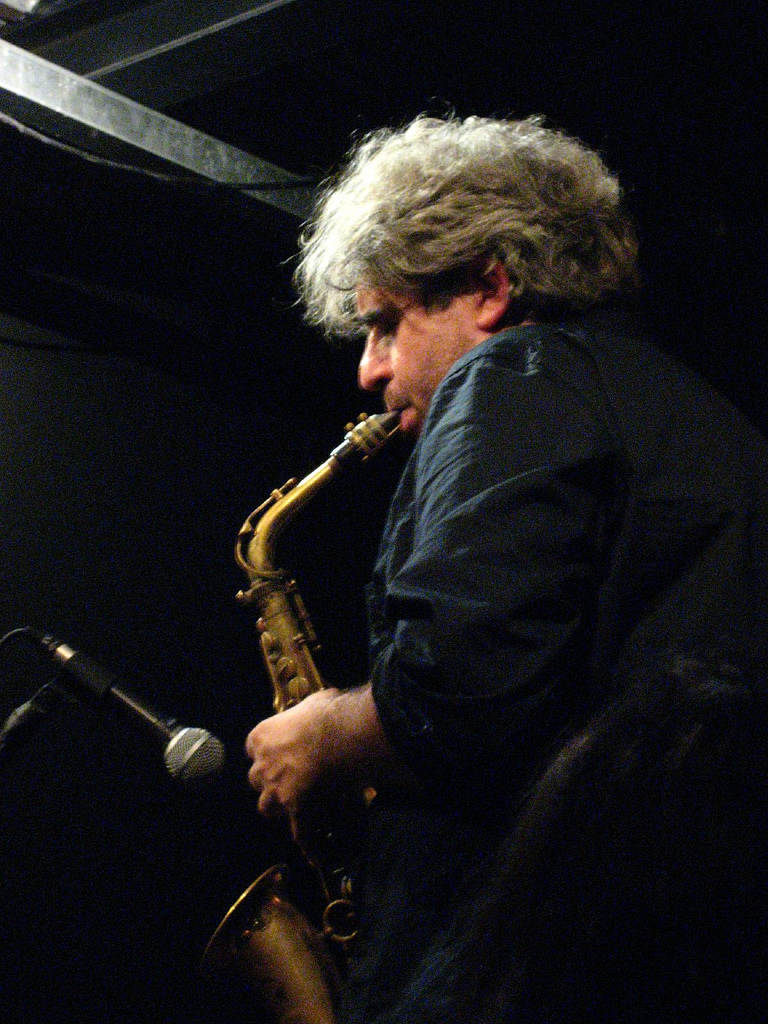

Background information
- Born: October 16, 1954 (age 72); Syracuse, New York, U.S.
- Genre: Avant-garde jazz
- Occupation: Musician
- Instrument: Saxophone
- Years active: 1979–present
- Labels: Empire, Soul Note, Columbia, JMT, Screwgun, Thirsty Ear, ECM, Intakt
- Website: screwgunrecords.com

Tim Berne (born October 16, 1954) is an American avant-garde jazz saxophonist and record label owner. His primary instruments are the alto and baritone saxophones.

== Biography ==
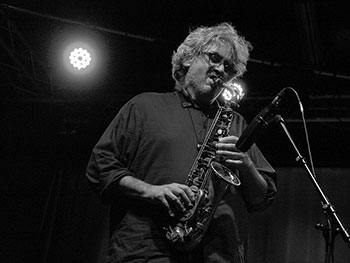
Tim Berne

Berne was born in Syracuse, New York, United States. He has said that he had no interest in playing an instrument until he attended Lewis & Clark College in Oregon. Hearing the album Dogon A.D. (1972) by Julius Hemphill turned his attention toward jazz. He was a fan of rhythm and blues, and it seemed to him that Hemphill was playing jazz with the soulfulness of R&B. In 1974, he went to New York to find Hemphill, who gave him saxophone lessons and advice on how to manage his career. Berne started the record label Empire Productions in 1979.

For Empire, he recorded four albums with avant-garde jazz musicians such as John Carter, Alex Cline, Nels Cline, Olu Dara, Vinny Golia, Paul Motian, and Ed Schuller. His next two albums appeared on Soul Note in the early 1980s. In these sessions he worked with Motian, Schuller, Ray Anderson, Herb Robertson and others. He then got a contract with Columbia and recorded with Robertson, Hank Roberts, Bill Frisell and others. During this time he also recorded a duo album with Frisell and two albums with John Zorn. After two albums with Columbia, he signed with JMT, a label known for avant-garde jazz.

In the 1990s, he recorded in the trio, Miniature, with Roberts and Joey Baron, and in the band Caos Totale with Django Bates, Mark Dresser, Marc Ducret, Steve Swell, and Bobby Previte. He led a trio with Michael Formanek and Jim Black, then added Chris Speed to form the quartet Bloodcount (which was occasionally a quintet with the addition of Ducret). PolyGram bought JMT and closed it. This motivated Berne to start Screwgun Records as the outlet for his albums.

Screwgun's first release was a 3-disc set by Bloodcount called Unwound, the music of which exemplified Berne's characteristic style of "explod[ing] the walls of traditional compositional form: instead of adhering to anything remotely resembling theme and variations, he intersperses thematic material–sometimes repeated, elongated, or truncated–with the careening pleasures of free improvisation." During the late 1990s he continued to perform with Bloodcount, formed Paraphrase, a trio with Drew Gress and Tom Rainey, and Big Satan, a trio with Ducret and Rainey.

In the early 2000s, Berne formed several groups, including the trio Hard Cell with Rainey and Craig Taborn and the quartet Science Friction (Berne, Ducret, Rainey, and Taborn). He also collaborated with members of The Bad Plus for the project Buffalo Collision, with Nels Cline of Wilco for the critically acclaimed album The Veil in 2011, and with David Torn on several projects and recordings.

Berne formed the band Snakeoil with Matt Mitchell, Oscar Noriega, and Ches Smith, which released a self-titled album in 2012, and six more recordings, with slight personnel changes, over the next decade. During this time, he has also recorded with members of The Bad Plus as Broken Shadows, and in duos with several musicians. In 2023 he released Oceans And with Hank Roberts and Aurora Nealand.

In the late 2010s albums by other musicians interpreting Berne's music have begun to appear. These include Førage by Matt Mitchell, Koi by Gregg Belisle-Chi, Palm Sweat by Marc Ducret, and Oddly Enough by Gordon Grdina.

== Groups ==
In approximate order of initial activity

- Miniature (Joey Baron, Hank Roberts)
- Caos Totale (Django Bates, Mark Dresser, Marc Ducret, Bobby Previte, Herb Robertson, Steve Swell)
- Bloodcount (Jim Black, Michael Formanek, Chris Speed, and sometimes Marc Ducret)
- Paraphrase (Drew Gress, Tom Rainey)
- Big Satan (Marc Ducret, Tom Rainey)
- Hard Cell (Tom Rainey, Craig Taborn)
- Science Friction (Marc Ducret, Tom Rainey, Craig Taborn)
- Buffalo Collision (Ethan Iverson, David King, Hank Roberts)
- Snakeoil (Marc Ducret, Matt Mitchell, Oscar Noriega, Ches Smith, formerly Ryan Ferreira)
- Broken Shadows (Reid Anderson, David King, Chris Speed)
- Capotosta (Gregg Belisle-Chi, Tom Rainey)

== Discography ==
=== As leader/co-leader ===
Release date	Album	Label	Personnel	Recording date	Notes
1979	The Five Year Plan	Empire	Tim Berne (alto sax), Vinny Golia (woodwinds), John Carter (clarinet), Glenn Ferris (trombone), Roberto Miranda (bass), Alex Cline (drums)	1979	
1980	7X	Empire	Tim Berne (alto sax), Vinny Golia (woodwinds), John Rapson (trombone), Nels Cline (guitar), Roberto Miranda (bass), Alex Cline (drums)	1980	
1981	Spectres	Empire	Tim Berne (alto sax), Olu Dara (trumpet), James Harvey (trombone), Ed Schuller (bass), Alex Cline (drums)	1981	
1982	Songs and Rituals in Real Time	Empire	Tim Berne (alto sax), Mack Goldsburg (tenor sax), Ed Schuller (bass), Paul Motian (drums)	1981	
1983	The Ancestors	Soul Note	Tim Berne (alto sax), Mack Goldsburg (tenor sax), Herb Robertson (trumpet), Ray Anderson (trombone), Ed Schuller (bass), Paul Motian (drums)	1983	
1984	Mutant Variations	Soul Note	Tim Berne (alto sax), Herb Robertson (trumpet), Ed Schuller (bass), Paul Motian (drums)	1983	
1984	Theoretically	Empire	Tim Berne (alto sax), Bill Frisell (guitar)	1984	
1987	Fulton Street Maul	Columbia	Tim Berne (alto sax), Bill Frisell (guitar), Hank Roberts (cello), Alex Cline (drums)	1986	
1987	Sanctified Dreams	Columbia	Tim Berne (alto sax), Herb Robertson (trumpet), Hank Roberts (cello), Mark Dresser (bass), Joey Baron (drums)	1987	
1988	Miniature	JMT	Tim Berne (alto sax), Hank Roberts (cello), Joey Baron (drums)	1988	
1989	Tim Berne's Fractured Fairy Tales	JMT	Tim Berne (alto sax), Herb Robertson (trumpet), Mark Feldman (violin), Hank Roberts (cello), Mark Dresser (bass), Joey Baron (drums)	1989	
1991	Pace Yourself	JMT	As Caos Totale; Tim Berne (alto sax), Herb Robertson (trumpet), Steve Swell (trombone), Marc Ducret (guitar), Mark Dresser (bass), Bobby Previte (drums)	1990	
1991	Can't Put My Finger on It	JMT	As Miniature; Tim Berne (alto sax, baritone sax), Hank Roberts (cello), Joey Baron (drums)	1991	
1993	Diminutive Mysteries (Mostly Hemphill)	JMT	Tim Berne (alto sax, baritone sax), David Sanborn (sopranino sax, alto sax), Marc Ducret (guitar), Hank Roberts (cello), Joey Baron (drums)	1992	
1993	Loose Cannon	Soul Note	Tim Berne (alto sax, baritone sax), Michael Formanek (bass), Jeff Hirschfeld (drums)	1992	
1994	Nice View	JMT	As Caos Totale; Tim Berne (alto sax), Herb Robertson (trumpet), Steve Swell (trombone), Django Bates (keyboards), Marc Ducret (guitar), Mark Dresser (bass), Bobby Previte (drums)	1993	
1995	Lowlife: The Paris Concert	JMT	As Bloodcount; Tim Berne (alto sax), Chris Speed (tenor sax, clarinet), Marc Ducret (guitar), Michael Formanek (bass), Jim Black (drums)	1994	
1995	Poisoned Minds: The Paris Concert	JMT	As Bloodcount; Tim Berne (alto sax, baritone sax), Chris Speed (tenor sax, clarinet), Marc Ducret (guitar), Michael Formanek (bass), Jim Black (drums)	1994	
1995	Memory Select: The Paris Concert	JMT	As Bloodcount; Tim Berne (alto sax, baritone sax), Chris Speed (tenor sax, clarinet), Marc Ducret (guitar), Michael Formanek (bass), Jim Black (drums)	1994	
1995	Inference	Music & Arts	Tim Berne (alto sax), Marilyn Crispell (piano)	1992	
1996	Unwound	Screwgun	As Bloodcount; Tim Berne (alto sax, baritone sax), Chris Speed (tenor sax, clarinet), Michael Formanek (bass), Jim Black (drums)	1996	
1997	Big Satan	Winter & Winter	As Big Satan; Tim Berne (alto sax, baritone sax), Marc Ducret (guitar), Tom Rainey (drums)	1996	Alternatively titled I Think They Liked In Honey
1997	Visitation Rites	Screwgun	As Paraphrase; Tim Berne (alto sax, baritone sax), Drew Gress (bass), Tom Rainey (drums)	1996	
1997	Discretion	Screwgun	As Bloodcount; Tim Berne (alto sax, baritone sax), Chris Speed (tenor sax, clarinet), Michael Formanek (bass), Jim Black (drums)	1997	
1997	Saturation Point	Screwgun	As Bloodcount; Tim Berne (alto sax, baritone sax), Chris Speed (tenor sax, clarinet), Michael Formanek (bass), Jim Black (drums)	1997	
1998	Ornery People	Little Brother	Tim Berne (alto sax, baritone sax), Michael Formanek (bass)	1997	
1998	Cause & Reflect	Level Green	Tim Berne (alto sax, baritone sax), Hank Roberts (cello)	1998	
1999	Please Advise	Screwgun	As Paraphrase; Tim Berne (alto sax, baritone sax), Drew Gress (bass), Tom Rainey (drums)	1998	
2001	The Shell Game	Thirsty Ear	Tim Berne (alto sax), Craig Taborn (keyboards), Tom Rainey (drums)	2001	
2001	Open, Coma	Screwgun	Tim Berne (alto sax), Hank Robertson (trumpet), Marc Ducret (guitar) with the Copenhagen Art Ensemble	2000	
2002	Science Friction	Screwgun	Tim Berne (alto sax), Craig Taborn (keyboards), Marc Ducret (guitar), Tom Rainey (drums)	2001	
2002	The Sevens	New World	ARTE Quartet with Marc Ducret (guitar) and David Torn (guitar, electronics)	2001	
2003	The Sublime And	Thirsty Ear	As Science Friction; Tim Berne (alto sax), Craig Taborn (keyboards), Marc Ducret (guitar), Tom Rainey (drums)	2003	
2004	Souls Saved Hear	Thirsty Ear	As Big Satan; Tim Berne (alto sax), Marc Ducret (guitar), Tom Rainey (drums)	2003	
2004	Electric and Acoustic Hard Cell Live	Screwgun	As Hard Cell; Tim Berne (alto sax), Craig Taborn (keyboards), Tom Rainey (drums)	2004	
2005	Feign	Screwgun	As Hard Cell; Tim Berne (alto sax), Craig Taborn (keyboards), Tom Rainey (drums)	2005	
2005	Pre-Emptive Denial	Screwgun	As Paraphrase; Tim Berne (alto sax), Drew Gress (bass), Tom Rainey (drums)	2005	
2006	Livein Cognito	Screwgun	As Big Satan; Tim Berne (alto sax), Marc Ducret (guitar), Tom Rainey (drums)	2006	
2007	Seconds	Screwgun	As Bloodcount; Tim Berne (alto sax, baritone sax), Chris Speed (tenor sax, clarinet), Michael Formanek (bass), Jim Black (drums)	1997	Includes DVD
2008	Duck	Screwgun	As Buffalo Collision; Tim Berne (alto sax), Ethan Iverson (piano), Hank Roberts (cello), David King (drums)	2007	
2011	Insomnia	Clean Feed	Tim Berne (alto sax, baritone sax), Chris Speed (clarinet), Baikida Carroll (trumpet), Dominique Pifarely (violin), Erik Friedlander (cello), Michael Formanek (bass), Jim Black (drums)	1997	
2011	Old And Unwise	Clean Feed	Tim Berne (alto sax), Bruno Chevillon (bass)	2010	
2011	The Veil	Cryptogramophone	As BB&C; Tim Berne (alto sax), Nels Cline (guitar), Jim Black (drums)	2009	
2012	Snakeoil	ECM	Tim Berne (alto sax), Oscar Noriega (clarinet), Matt Mitchell (piano), Ches Smith (drums)	2011	
2013	Shadow Man	ECM	As Snakeoil; Tim Berne (alto sax), Oscar Noriega (clarinet), Matt Mitchell (piano), Ches Smith (drums, vibraphone)	2013	
2015	You've Been Watching Me	ECM	As Snakeoil; Tim Berne (alto sax), Oscar Noriega (clarinet), Ryan Ferreira (guitar), Matt Mitchell (piano), Ches Smith (drums, vibraphone)	2014	
2015	Spare	Screwgun	As Snakeoil; Tim Berne (alto sax), Oscar Noriega (clarinet), Matt Mitchell (piano), Ches Smith (drums)	2013	Included with book of Steve Byram illustrations
2017	My First Tour - Live In Brussels	None	Tim Berne (alto sax), Herb Robertson (trumpet), Ed Schuller (bass), Paul Motian (drums)	1983	Digital Only
2017	Incidentals	ECM	As Snakeoil; Tim Berne (alto sax), Oscar Noriega (clarinet), Ryan Ferreira (guitar), Matt Mitchell (piano), Ches Smith (drums, vibraphone)	2014	
2018	Angel Dusk	Screwgun	Tim Berne (alto sax), Matt Mitchell (piano)	2017	
2019	Broken Shadows	Intakt	Tim Berne (alto sax), Chris Speed (tenor sax), Reid Anderson (bass), David King (drums)	2018	
2020	The Fantastic Mrs. 10	Intakt	As Snakeoil; Tim Berne (alto sax), Oscar Noriega (clarinet), Marc Ducret (guitar), Matt Mitchell (piano), Ches Smith (drums, vibraphone)	2019	
2020	The Coanda Effect	Relative Pitch	Tim Berne (alto sax), Nasheet Waits (drums)	2019	
2020	The Deceptive 4	Intakt	As Snakeoil; Tim Berne (alto sax), Oscar Noriega (clarinet), Matt Mitchell (piano), Ches Smith (drums)	2017	
2020	Spiders	Out Of Your Head Untamed	Tim Berne (alto sax), Matt Mitchell (piano)	2020	Digital Only
2020	Sacred Vowels	Screwgun	Tim Berne (alto sax)	2020	Digital Only
2020	Adobe Probe	Screwgun	Tim Berne (alto sax), Chris Speed (tenor sax), Shane Endsley (trumpet), Matt Mitchell (piano), Marc Ducret (guitar), Michael Formanek (bass), Dan Weiss (drums)	2009	Digital Only
2020	Broken Shadows Live	Screwgun	Tim Berne (alto sax), Chris Speed (tenor sax), Reid Anderson (bass), David King (drums)	2019	Digital Only
2020	1	Screwgun	Tim Berne (alto sax), Matt Mitchell (piano)	2010	Digital Only
2020	Blood From A Stone	Radio Legs	Tim Berne (alto sax), Mark Helias (bass)	2020	Digital Only
2020	The Cosmos	Screwgun	As Hard Cell; Tim Berne (alto sax), Craig Taborn (keyboards), Tom Rainey (drums)	2007	Digital Only
2020	+Size	Screwgun	As Science Friction; Tim Berne (alto sax), Hank Robertson (trumpet), Craig Taborn (keyboards), Marc Ducret (guitar), Tom Rainey (drums)	2003	Digital Only
2021	Sensitive	Screwgun	As Hard Cell; Tim Berne (alto sax), Craig Taborn (keyboards), Tom Rainey (drums)	2000	Digital Only
2021	Attention Spam	Screwgun	As Bloodcount; Tim Berne (alto sax, baritone sax), Chris Speed (tenor sax, clarinet), Michael Formanek (bass), Jim Black (drums)	1997	Digital Only
2021	5	Screwgun	As Bloodcount; Tim Berne (alto sax, baritone sax), Chris Speed (tenor sax, clarinet), Marc Ducret (guitar), Michael Formanek (bass), Jim Black (drums)	1997	Digital Only
2022	(D)IVO	Mahakala	Ivo Perelman (soprano sax), Tim Berne (alto sax), Tony Malaby (tenor sax), James Carter (baritone sax)	2022	
2022	Tangled	Screwgun	Tim Berne (alto sax), Nasheet Waits (drums)	2021	Digital Only
2022	Decay	Screwgun	Tim Berne (alto sax), Ryan Ferreira (guitar), Michael Formanek (bass), Ches Smith (drums)	2015	Digital Only
2022	Zone One	Screwgun	Tim Berne (alto sax), Gregg Belisle-Chi (guitar)	2022	Digital Only
2022	Mars	Intakt	Tim Berne (alto sax), Gregg Belisle-Chi (guitar)	2021	
2022	One More, Please	Intakt	Tim Berne (alto sax), Matt Mitchell (piano)	2021	
2023	Oceans And	Intakt	Tim Berne (alto sax), Aurora Nealand (accordion, clarinet, voice), Hank Roberts (cello)	2022	
2024	No Tamales On Wednesdays	Screwgun	As Science Friction; Tim Berne (alto sax), Craig Taborn (keyboards), Marc Ducret (guitar), Tom Rainey (drums)	2008	Digital Only
2024	Lucid/Still	Screwgun	As Oceans And; Tim Berne (alto sax), Aurora Nealand (accordion, voice), Hank Roberts (cello)	2023	Digital Only
2024	Burning Up	Relative Pitch	Tim Berne (alto sax), Chloë Sobek (violone)	2023	
2024	Live At The 188 Club	Screwgun	Tim Berne (alto sax), Aurora Nealand (accordion, clarinet, voice), Mark Helias (bass)	2023	Digital Only
2024	Live In Someplace Nice	Screwgun	Tim Berne (alto sax), Bill Frisell (guitar)	1984	Digital Only
2024	Parlour Games	Relative Pitch	Tim Berne (alto sax), Michael Formanek (bass)	1991	
2025	Yikes Too	Out Of Your Head / Screwgun	Tim Berne (alto sax), Gregg Belisle-Chi (guitar), Tom Rainey (guitar)	2024	
2025	Poiēsis	Relative Pitch	Tim Berne (alto sax), Masayo Koketsu (alto sax), Nava Dunkelman (percussion)	2023	
2025	Snakeoil OK	Screwgun	As Snakeoil; Tim Berne (alto sax), Oscar Noriega (clarinet), Matt Mitchell (piano), Ches Smith (drums)	2013	Digital Only
2025	In Lieu Of	Screwgun	As Snakeoil; Tim Berne (alto sax), Oscar Noriega (clarinet), Matt Mitchell (piano), Ches Smith (drums)	2012	Digital Only
2025	Medium Cool	Radio Legs	Tim Berne (alto sax, baritone sax), Mark Helias (bass)	1989	Digital Only
2026	Deflection Pool	Out Of Your Head	Tim Berne (alto sax), Aurora Nealand (accordion, voice, clarinet), Craig Taborn (synthesizers), Aliya Ultan (cello), Tom Rainey (drums)	2026	Digital Only

==== Compilations ====
Release date	Title	Label	Included albums
1999	The Empire Box	Screwgun	The Five Year Plan, 7X, Spectres, Songs and Rituals in Real Time
2007	Mind Over Friction	Screwgun	

=== Albums featuring music by Tim Berne ===
- Matt Mitchell - Førage (Screwgun, 2017)
- Gregg Belisle-Chi - Koi (Relative Pitch, 2021)
- Gordon Grdina - Oddly Enough (Attaboygirl, 2022)
- Marc Ducret - Palm Sweat (Out Of Your Head/Screwgun, 2023)
- Gregg Belisle-Chi - Slow Crawl (Intakt, 2025)

=== As sideman ===
With Ray Anderson

- Big Band Record (Gramavision, 1994)

With Nels Cline

- Angelica (Enja, 1988)

With Marc Ducret

- Tower Vol. 2 (Ayler, 2011)
- Tower Bridge (Ayler, 2014)

With Enten Eller

- Melquiades (Splasc(H), 1999)
- Auto da Fe (Splasc(H), 2001)

With Umberto Petrin

- Ellessi (Splasc(H), 1999)

With Jazzophone Compagnie

- Mosaiques (Yolk, 2000)

With Simon Fell

- Positions & Descriptions (Clean Feed, 2011)

With Figure 8

- Pipe Dreams (Black Saint, 1994)

With Michael Formanek

- Extended Animation (Enja, 1992)
- Low Profile (Enja, 1994)
- Nature of the Beast (Enja, 1997)
- The Rub and Spare Change (ECM, 2010)
- Small Places (ECM, 2012)
- The Distance (ECM, 2016)
- Even Better (Intakt, 2019)
- Pre-Apocalyptic (Out Of Your Head, 2020)
- Other Zones (Circular File, 2022)

With Vinny Golia

- Compositions for Large Ensemble (Nine Winds, 1984)
- Facts of Their Own Lives (Nine Winds, 1986)

With Drew Gress

- Spin & Drift (Premonition, 2001)
- 7 Black Butterflies (Premonition, 2005)
- The Irrational Numbers (Premonition, 2007)
- The Sky Inside (Pirouet, 2013)

With Mark Helias

- Split Image (Enja, 1985)
- The Current Set (Enja, 1986)

With Julius Hemphill

- Five Chord Stud (Black Saint, 1994)
- One Atmosphere (Tzadik, 2003)

With Ingrid Laubrock

- Ubatuba (2015)

With Mr. Rencore

- Intollerant (Auand, 2011)

With Hank Roberts

- Black Pastels (JMT, 1988)

With Herb Robertson

- Transparency (JMT, 1985)
- X-Cerpts: Live at Willisau (JMT, 1987)
- Elaboration (Clean Feed, 2005)
- Real Aberration (Clean Feed, 2007)

With Samo Salamon & Tom Rainey

- Duality (Samo, 2012)

With George Schuller

- Hellbent (Playscape, 2002)

With Ches Smith

- Hammered (Clean Feed, 2013)
- International Hoohah (For Tune, 2014)

With Spring Heel Jack

- Masses (Thirsty Ear, 2001)

With David Torn

- Prezens (ECM, 2005)
- Slipped on a Bar (Screwgun, 2009) with Prezens
- Sun of Goldfinger (ECM, 2019)
- Congratulations To You (Screwgun, 2020) with Sun of Goldfinger
- xFORM (Screwgun, 2020) with Prezens
- Ozmir (Screwgun, 2022) with Sun of Goldfinger
- Mystic (Screwgun, 2023) with The Sunny Four
- Ravens Low & Ready 2 (Screwgun, 2024)
- Candid (Intakt, 2025) with Sunny Five
- Door (Self-released, 2025)

With Stefan Winter

- The Little Trumpet (JMT, 1986)

With Yōsuke Yamashita

- Ways of Time (Verve, 1995)

With John Zorn

- The Big Gundown (Nonesuch/Icon, 1986)
- Spy vs Spy (Elektra/Musician, 1989)

With GingerBlackGinger

- Smalltalk Code (Challenge, 2026)
