= Screwgun Records =

- Founded: 1996
- Founder: Tim Berne
- Genre: Jazz
- Country of origin: U.S.
- Location: Brooklyn, New York
- Official website: www.screwgunrecords.com

Screwgun Records is a jazz record label founded by saxophonist Tim Berne in 1996. Most releases on the label have been by Berne, though some have been by Berne's associates and bandmates. Steve Byram has designed and illustrated the artwork for many of the label's albums.

After attending college in Oregon, Berne moved to New York City in the 1970s to meet saxophonist Julius Hemphill, whose music had inspired him to become a jazz musician. Hemphill became his mentor, giving him saxophone lessons and helping him find his way in the music business. Berne founded Empire Records in the late 1970s to issue own albums. He released five albums, and his work was noticed by Giovanni Bonandrini, an Italian producer who issued Berne's next two albums on Soul Note. Berne signed with Columbia Records in the 1980s, then recorded for JMT Records until it shut down in 1995. Then Berne founded Screwgun to get control of his work again. Screwgun albums were initially distinguished by their brown, cardboard covers decorated with the line drawings of Steve Byram. The unorthodox artwork fit Berne's unorthodox music and business tactics.

== Discography ==
=== Physical Releases ===
Year released	Catalogue No.	Artist	Title	Notes
1996	SCREWU 70001	Tim Berne's Bloodcount	Unwound	3-CD Box Set - Limited Edition of 2000
1997	SCREWU 70002	Tim Berne's Paraphrase	Visitation Rites	
1997	SCREWU 70003	Tim Berne's Bloodcount	Discretion	
1997	SCREWU 70004	Tim Berne's Bloodcount	Saturation Point	
1998	SCREWU 70005	Marc Ducret	Un Certain Malaise	
1998	SCREWU 70006	Michael Formanek	Am I Bothering You?	
1998	SCREWU 70007	Django Bates	Quiet Nights	
1998	SCREWU 70008	Julius Hemphill	Blue Boyé	2-CD Box Set rerelease of 1977 album on Mbari Records
1998	SCREWU 70009	Tim Berne	The Empire Box	5-CD Box Set compiling The Five Year Plan, 7X, Spectres, and Songs and Rituals in Real Time
1999	SCREWU 70010	Marc Ducret	L'Ombra di Verdi	
1999	SCREWU 70011	Tim Berne's Paraphrase	Please Advise	
2001	SCREWU 012	Tim Berne and The Copenhagen Art Ensemble with Herb Robertson and Marc Ducret	Open, Coma	2-CD Set
2002	SCREWU 013	Tim Berne	Science Friction	
2004	sc70014	Tim Berne's Hard Cell	Electric and Acoustic Hard Cell Live	
2005	sc70015	Tim Berne's Hard Cell	Feign	
2005	sc70016	Tim Berne's Paraphrase	Pre-Emptive Denial	
2006	sc70017	Tim Berne's Big Satan	Livein Cognito	2-CD Set
2007	sc70018	Tim Berne's Science Friction	Mind Over Friction	3-CD Set compiling Science Friction and The Sublime And
2007	sc70019	Tim Berne's Bloodcount	Seconds	2-CD + DVD Set
2008	none	Buffalo Collision	(Duck)	
2015	none	Tim Berne, Steve Byram, Snakeoil	Spare/Anguis Oleum	Limited Edition Book by Steve Byram (Spare) and live CD by Snakeoil (Anguis Oleum)
2017	none	Matt Mitchell, Tim Berne	Forage	Composed by Tim Berne, performed by Matt Mitchell
2018	none	Tim Berne, Matt Mitchell	Angel Dusk	

=== Joint Releases ===
Year released	Catalogue No.	Artist	Title	Notes
2023	Screwgun/OOYH 001	Marc Ducret	Palm Sweat	CD and Vinyl, Joint release with Out Of Your Head Records
2025	Screwgun/OOYH 002	Tim Berne, Tom Rainey, Gregg Belisle-Chi	Yikes Too	CD and Vinyl, Joint release with Out Of Your Head Records

=== Digital-only Releases ===
Year released	Catalogue No.	Artist	Title	Notes
2009	none	Prezens	Slipped On A Bar	
2017	none	Tim Berne, Paul Motian, Ed Schuller, Herb Robertson	My First Tour - Live In Brussels	
2020	none	Tim Berne	Sacred Vowels	
2020	none	David Torn	Fur	
2020	none	Tim Berne 7	Adobe Probe	
2020	none	Hank Roberts, Tim Berne	Cause And Reflect	Remastered reissue of 1998 release
2020	none	Broken Shadows	Broken Shadows Live	
2020	none	Matt Mitchell, Tim Berne	1	
2020	none	Sun Of Goldfinger	Congratulations To You	
2020	none	Prezens	xForm	
2020	none	Prezens	Slipped On A Bar	Reissue of 2009 release
2020	none	Hard Cell	The Cosmos	
2020	none	Science Friction	+Size	
2021	none	Hard Cell	Sensitive	
2021	none	Bloodcount	Attention Spam	
2021	none	Bloodcount	5	
2022	none	Tim Berne, Nasheet Waits	Tangled	
2022	none	Sun Of Goldfinger	Ozmir	
2022	none	Tim Berne, Ryan Ferreira, Michael Formanek, Ches Smith	Decay	
2022	none	Tim Berne, Gregg Belisle-Chi	Zone One	
2023	none	The Sunny Four	Mystic	
2024	none	David Torn, Tom Rainey, Tim Berne, Trevor Dunn	Disco Tent/Ravens Low and Ready 2	
2024	none	Science Friction	No Tamales On Wednesday	
2024	none	Oceans And	Lucid/Still	
2024	none	Aurora Nealand, Mark Helias, Tim Berne	Live At The 188 Club	
2024	none	Tim Berne with Bill Frisell	Live In Someplace Nice	
2025	none	Snakeoil	Snakeoil OK	
2025	none	Snakeoil	In Lieu Of	

== See also ==
- List of record labels
