= Palazzi =

Palazzi is an Italian surname. Notable people with the surname include:

- Abdul Hadi Palazzi (born 1961), Italian imam
- Andrea Palazzi (born 1996), Italian footballer
- Carlo Palazzi (died 2000), Italian fashion designer
- Caterina Palazzi (born 1982), Italian musician
- Gaetano Palazzi (1832–1892), Italian painter
- Lou Palazzi (1921–2007), American football player
- Mattia Palazzi (born 1978), Italian politician
- Michele Palazzi (born 1984), Italian photographer
- Mirko Palazzi (born 1987), Italian-born Sammarinese footballer
- Osvaldo Palazzi, Italian gymnast
- Togo Palazzi (1932–2022), American basketball player
- Giacomo Palazzi (born 2004)
