= Paradoxical Frog (album) =

Studio album by Kris Davis, Ingrid Laubrock, Tyshawn Sorey
- Released: 2010
- Recorded: August 4, 2009
- Studio: System Two, Brooklyn
- Genre: Jazz
- Length: 75:24
- Label: Clean Feed
- Producer: Kris Davis, Ingrid Laubrock, Tyshawn Sorey

Kris Davis chronology
Rye Eclipse (2008)	Paradoxical Frog (2010)	Good Citizen (2010)

Ingrid Laubrock chronology
Sleepthief (2008)	Paradoxical Frog (2010)	Anti-House (2010)

Paradoxical Frog is the debut album by a collective trio consisting of Kris Davis on piano, Ingrid Laubrock on tenor sax and Tyshawn Sorey on drums. It was recorded in 2009 and released on the Portuguese Clean Feed label.

== Reception ==
Professional ratings
Review scores
Source	Rating
All About Jazz	5/5 stars

In his review for JazzTimes Josef Woodard says that, "the trio presents a colorful and convincing example of post-free jazz, mixing intricate rhythmic notions, introspective musings and moments of cathartic release."

The 5-star All About Jazz review by Chris May notes that, "Despite its instrumentation, a good portion of the album is reminiscent of piano/bass/drums trio The Necks at its most spacious and unhurried."

The Point of Departure review by Troy Collins states, "The simultaneous release of Pool School and Paradoxical Frog make a strong case for Ingrid Laubrock as a major new player worthy of extra attention, and is a testament to the creative diversity of the Downtown scene and Clean Feed's efforts to document it."

The editors of NPR Music included the album in their feature "The Best New Jazz Of 2010 (So Far)", and reviewer Lars Gotrich noted that the musicians "share a similar approach to abstract jazz composition and execution: loose and unfolding like a flowering tea, yet full of unexpected color."

== Track listing ==
1. "Iron Spider" (Davis) – 4:43
2. "Paradoxical Frog" (Laubrock) – 11:50
3. "Slow Burn" (Sorey) – 14:22
4. "Canines" (Laubrock) – 9:12
5. "Homograph" (Sorey) – 12:38
6. "Ghost Machine" (Davis) – 5:16
7. "On the Six" (Sorey) – 4:01
8. "Feldman" (Davis) – 13:22

== Personnel ==
- Kris Davis – piano
- Ingrid Laubrock – tenor sax
- Tyshawn Sorey – drums
