= Lifespan (album) =

Studio album by Kris Davis
- Released: 2004
- Recorded: June 9 & 10, 2003
- Studio: Systems Two, Brooklyn
- Genre: Jazz
- Length: 65:46
- Label: Fresh Sound New Talent
- Producer: Russ Johnson, Kris Davis

Kris Davis chronology
| Lifespan (2004) | The Slightest Shift (2006) |

Lifespan is the debut album by Canadian jazz pianist Kris Davis, which was recorded in 2003 and released on the Spanish Fresh Sound New Talent label.

== Reception ==
Professional ratings
Review scores
| Source | Rating |
|---|---|
| Tom Hull | B+ |
| The Penguin Guide to Jazz Recordings | 3/4 stars |

The All About Jazz review by John Kelman states "Davis has a writing style that has already, at this early stage, developed into a unique sound. Her material would fit comfortably within an ECM context; while there is intensity to be found, the overall approach is more inward-looking."

Reviewing for The Village Voice in September 2004, Tom Hull said of the album, "Piano trio plus three horns do her bidding without clutter or show."

== Track listing ==
All compositions by Kris Davis

1. "Jo-ann" – 9:16
2. "Argyha" – 7:57
3. "Travel Far" – 11:00
4. "Lifespan" – 4:29
5. "Even Eivind" – 10:32
6. "Nein" – 1:55
7. "Endless" – 8:15
8. "The Epic" – 12:18

== Personnel ==
- Tony Malaby – tenor sax, soprano sax
- Russ Johnson – flugelhorn, trumpet
- Jason Rigby – tenor sax, soprano sax, bass clarinet, clarinet
- Kris Davis – piano
- Eivind Opsvik – bass
- Jeff Davis – drums
