= Capricorn Climber =

Studio album by Kris Davis
- Released: 2013
- Recorded: March 22, 2012
- Studios: Systems Two, Brooklyn
- Genre: Jazz
- Length: 60:17
- Label: Clean Feed
- Producer: Kris Davis

Kris Davis chronology
Union (2012)	Capricorn Climber (2013)	Massive Threads (2013)

Capricorn Climber is an album by Canadian jazz pianist Kris Davis, which was recorded in 2012 and released on the Portuguese Clean Feed label.

== Reception ==
Professional ratings
Review scores
Source	Rating
AllMusic	4/5 stars
Down Beat	4/5 stars

In his review for AllMusic, Dave Lynch notes that, "even as the music lingers in a free rhythmic zone with fragmented, initially hesitant motifs, the sonic puzzle pieces fit together with a combination of improvisational looseness and the clear-cut intention of chamberesque modern composition, with nothing out of place."

The Down Beat review by Shaun Brady states, "The sound of the quintet conjures a chamber ensemble in a state of decay, their grace and elegance evident but their tensions being revealed in enlightening fashion."

In a double review for JazzTimes Lloyd Sachs says, "The quintet alternates between wide tonal brush strokes and brisk melodies, free-floating effects and knotty inventions."

== Track listing ==
All compositions by Kris Davis except as indicated

1. "Too Tinkerbell" – 5:30
2. "Pass the Magic Hat" – 9:50
3. "Trevor's Luffa Complex" – 5:34
4. "Capricorn Climber" – 11:33
5. "Bottom of a Well" – 7:05
6. "Big Band Ball" – 4:58
7. "Pi Is Irrational" – 7:55
8. "Dreamers in a Daze" (Davis, Maneri, Laubrock, Dunn, Rainey) – 4:38
9. "Too Tinkerbell Coda" – 3:14

== Personnel ==
- Kris Davis – piano
- Mat Maneri – viola
- Ingrid Laubrock – sax
- Trevor Dunn – double bass
- Tom Rainey – drums, glockenspiel
