= Union (Paradoxical Frog album) =

Studio album by Paradoxical Frog
- Released: 2012
- Recorded: October 10, 2011
- Studio: System Two, Brooklyn
- Genre: Jazz
- Length: 71:50
- Label: Clean Feed
- Producer: Kris Davis, Ingrid Laubrock, Tyshawn Sorey

Kris Davis chronology
Aeriol Piano (2011)	Union (2012)	Capricorn Climber (2013)

Ingrid Laubrock chronology
Haste (2012)	Union (2012)	Strong Place (2013)

Union is the second album by Paradoxical Frog, a collective trio consisting of pianist Kris Davis, saxophonist Ingrid Laubrock and drummer Tyshawn Sorey. It was recorded in 2011 and released on the Portuguese Clean Feed label.

== Reception ==
Professional ratings
Review scores
Source	Rating
All About Jazz	3/5 stars
Down Beat	3.5/5 stars
The Free Jazz Collective	4.5/5 stars

The Down Beat review by Bill Meyer says that, "This music is so concerned with essence that it sometimes errs on the side of severity; one wishes for just a bit more payoff after so much restraint."

In a double review for JazzTimes Lloyd Sachs states, "That Union is [fun] speaks to how much Davis, Laubrock and Sorey enjoy not only their group concept, but playing in each other's company."

Martin Longley of the BBC commented: "The concept behind this trio is one of complete equality. Sometimes the trio can perform in a completely improvising frame of mind, but this recording inserts a significant ratio of composed themes, naturally infused with more spontaneous diversions. Each member contributes their own pieces... All spheres are open to the Frog."

The Free Jazz Collective's Paolo Casertano called the album "fascinating," and remarked: "Every musician takes his time to distil few powerful notes... This is, among the trio releases I've been lately listening to, maybe the closest to a spoken conversation. I have no other words to describe it."

== Track listing ==
1. "An Intermittent Procession" (Sorey) – 2:19
2. "First Strike" (Laubrock) – 5:52
3. "Fear the Fairy Dust" (Davis) – 11:03
4. "Second Strike" (Laubrock) – 7:07
5. "Figment 2012" (Sorey) – 9:03
6. "Union" (Davis) – 10:22
7. "Masterisk" (Laubrock) – 12:17
8. "Repose" (Sorey) – 12:15
9. "Third Strike, You're Out" (Laubrock) – 1:32

== Personnel ==
- Kris Davis – piano
- Ingrid Laubrock – tenor sax, soprano sax
- Tyshawn Sorey – drums, melodica, trombone
