= Save Your Breath =

Studio album by Kris Davis
- Released: 2015
- Recorded: January 7 & 8, 2014
- Studio: Sear Sound, New York City
- Genre: Jazz
- Length: 66:29
- Label: Clean Feed
- Producer: David Breskin

Kris Davis chronology
Waiting for You to Grow (2014)	Save Your Breath (2015)

Save Your Breath is an album by Canadian jazz pianist Kris Davis, which was recorded in 2014 and released on the Portuguese Clean Feed label. For this project, Davis assembled the band Infrasound, an unusual octet consisting of four bass clarinets, organ, guitar, drums and piano. She created the music on a commission from The Shifting Foundation. The album was recorded and mixed by rock engineer Ron Saint Germain.

== Reception ==
Professional ratings
Review scores
Source	Rating
AllMusic	4.5/5 stars
Down Beat	4.5/5 stars

In his review for AllMusic, Dave Lynch says about Infrasoud that "is a monster band capable of delivering a gargantuan punch."

The Down Beat review by John Ephland notes that "Whether it’s the new-music classical vibe interfacing with the down-home sense of abandon or the sound of the instruments themselves and the novel assortment Davis has brought on board, Save Your Breath seems to have something for everyone."

In a review for All About Jazz Glenn Astarita describes the album as "a musical journey that may be akin to navigating through a dense forest via snaking trails, rolling hills and dusky caves."

== Track listing ==
All compositions by Kris Davis

1. "Union Forever" – 9:27
2. "Jumping Over Your Shadow" – 10:37
3. "Always Leave Them (Wanting More)" – 10:01
4. "Whirly Swirly" – 11:53
5. "The Ghost of Your Previous Fuckup" – 9:41
6. "Save Your Breath" – 14:50

== Personnel ==
- Ben Goldberg – bass clarinet, contra alto clarinet, clarinet
- Oscar Noriega – bass clarinet, clarinet
- Joachim Badenhorst – bass clarinet, clarinet
- Andrew Bishop – contrabass clarinet, clarinet
- Nate Radley – guitar
- Gary Versace – organ
- Jim Black – drums
- Kris Davis – piano
