= Pool School =

Studio album by Tom Rainey
- Released: 2010
- Recorded: September 4, 2009
- Studio: Systems Two, Brooklyn
- Genre: Jazz
- Length: 58:18
- Label: Clean Feed
- Producer: Tom Rainey

Tom Rainey chronology
Pool School (2010)	Camino Cielo Echo (2012)

Pool School is the debut album by American jazz drummer Tom Rainey, which was recorded in 2009 and released on the Portuguese Clean Feed label.

== Reception ==
The All About Jazz review by Chris May notes that "The 12 tracks move adroitly between the composed and the improvised, the inside and the outside, the sun lounger and the deep end."

The Point of Departure review by Troy Collins states "This date shares numerous conceptual similarities with Sleepthief. Both albums offer experimental narratives bolstered by considered interplay and impressively intuitive logic, with Halvorson's idiosyncratic electric guitar providing a far more assertive edge than Noble's crystalline piano."

== Track listing ==
All compositions by Rainey, Halvorson, Laubrock

1. "Home Opener" – 5:33
2. "Calico Road" – 5:35
3. "Three Bag Mary" – 3:42
4. "Pool School" – 5:08
5. "Om on the Range" – 4:22
6. "Coney" – 5:58
7. "More Mesa" – 5:34
8. "Crinkles" – 3:26
9. "Semi-Bozo" – 7:18
10. "Heymana" – 4:06
11. "Clean Feat" – 3:59
12. "Pacification" – 3:37

== Personnel ==
- Ingrid Laubrock – tenor sax, soprano sax
- Mary Halvorson – guitar
- Tom Rainey – drums
