= The Slightest Shift =

Studio album by Kris Davis
- Released: 2006
- Recorded: October 7, 2005
- Studio: Systems Two, Brooklyn
- Genre: Jazz
- Length: 39:56
- Label: Fresh Sound New Talent
- Producer: Kris Davis

Kris Davis chronology
Lifespan (2004)	The Slightest Shift (2006)	Rye Eclipse (2008)

Professional ratings
Review scores
Source	Rating
Allmusic	4/5 stars
The Penguin Guide to Jazz Recordings	3.5/4 stars

The Slightest Shift is the second album by Canadian jazz pianist Kris Davis, which was recorded in 2005 and released on the Spanish Fresh Sound New Talent label.

== Reception ==
The All About Jazz review by Troy Collins states, "An intriguing mix of influences, Davis' singular pianism is never derivative. Subconsciously revealing her classical training, touches of Ligeti and Bartok hover in the margins of her phrasing."

In a review for JazzTimes Forrest Dylan Bryant says, "Digging through eight of the pianist’s turbulent, open-structured pieces in a crisp 40 minutes, they slide readily into collective groans, finger-snapping Monk-ish walks and tumbled heaps of crossed melodic lines."

== Track listing ==
All compositions by Kris Davis

1. "Bloodwine" – 7:14
2. "And Then I Said..." – 3:50
3. "Once" – 4:00
4. "35¢" – 3:10
5. "Morning Stretches" – 3:58
6. "Jack's Song" – 4:28
7. "Twice Escaped" – 5:01
8. "The Slightest Shift" – 8:15

== Personnel ==
- Kris Davis – piano
- Tony Malaby – tenor sax
- Eivind Opsvik – bass
- Jeff Davis – drums
