= Kris Davis =

Canadian jazz pianist and composer

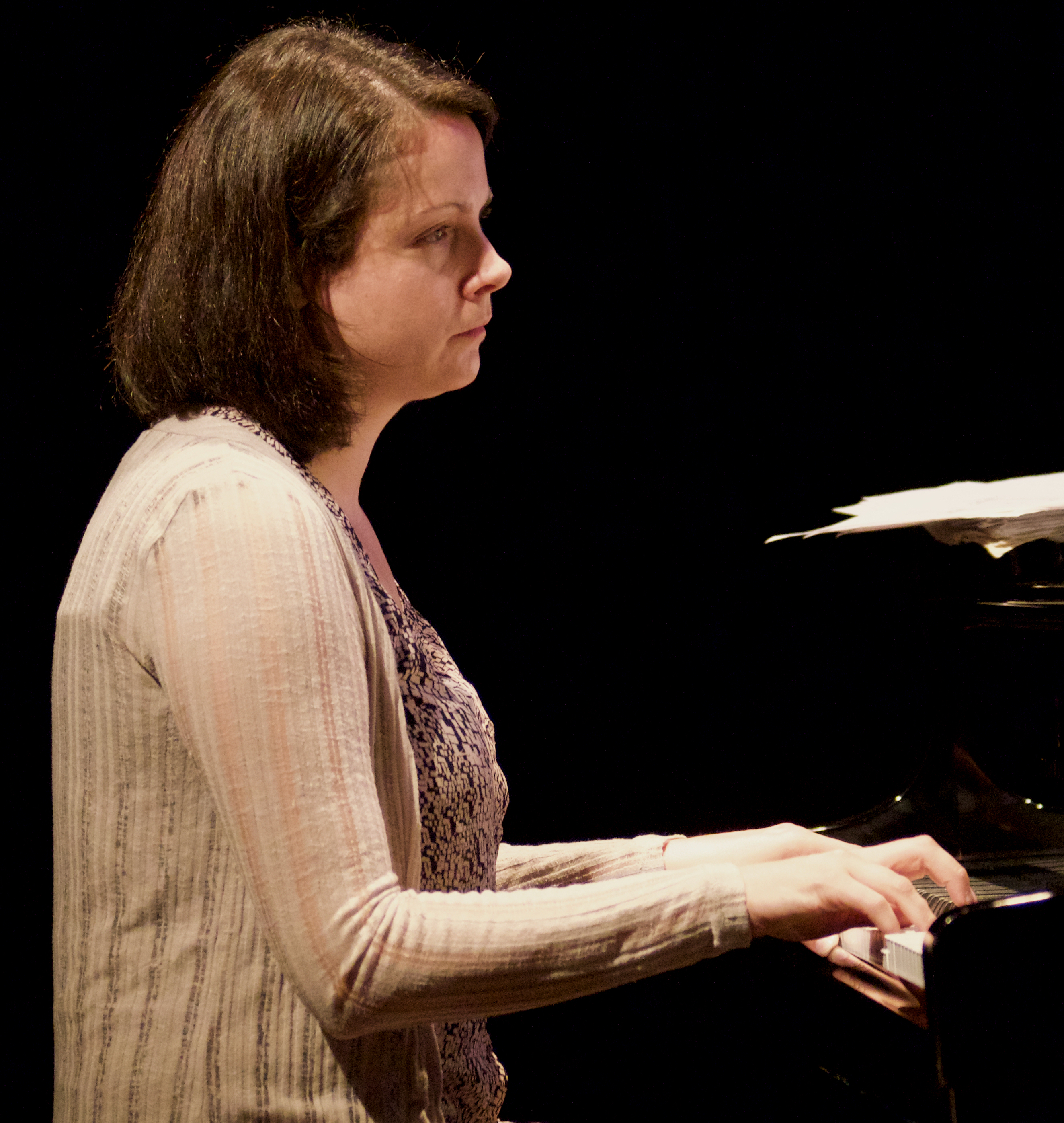
- Davis in 2014

Background information
- Born: 1980 (age 45–46); Vancouver, Canada
- Genres: Jazz
- Occupation: Musician
- Instrument: Piano
- Years active: Early 2000s–present
- Labels: Fresh Sound, Clean Feed, Thirsty Ear
- Website: krisdavis.net

Kris Davis (born 1980) is a Canadian jazz pianist and composer.

== Early life ==
Davis was born in Vancouver in 1980 and grew up in Calgary, Alberta. She studied classical piano from the age of six and discovered jazz while a high school student. She transcribed performances by pianists Herbie Hancock and Keith Jarrett. She later reported that, "By the eighth grade I knew I wanted to be a jazz musician." She later majored in jazz piano at the University of Toronto.

== Later life and career ==
Davis moved to New York in 2001. After her first album, Lifespan, was recorded in 2003, Davis says she "decided not to play chords anymore, just to play lines."

In 2009, Davis played solo concerts during a tour of Portugal. She followed this with a solo piano album, Aeriol Piano, which included sections for prepared piano. Her 2014 trio album Waiting for You to Grow was the follow-up to Good Citizen around five years earlier. On the change in style over the two releases, Davis said, "I had this concept to make [Good Citizen] almost like a pop record, where the tunes are really short [while] on the new record the tunes are much longer and explore multiple areas. I just wanted to write and not have any preconceived ideas".

In 2013, Davis composed a suite for four bass clarinets, guitar, piano, organ and drums. In 2014, Davis had a six-day residency at The Stone in New York City and played in the UK for the first time.

Davis completed her master's degree in composition at the City College of New York in 2014.

In 2015, Davis received a Doris Duke Impact Award. The following year, she performed John Zorn’s Bagatelles in both Quebec and New York City in a quartet with Mary Halvorson, Drew Gress, and Tyshawn Sorey. Her album Duopoly was included in 2016 best-of lists in publications including The New York Times, NPR Music, and PopMatters. Davis also founded the label Pyroclastic Records in 2016, and three years later she formed a nonprofit organization to support the label.

In 2019, Davis began work as instructor and assistant director at Berklee College of Music's Institute of Jazz and Gender Justice. Later that year, her record Diatom Ribbons was named jazz album of the year by The New York Times and the NPR Music Jazz Critics Poll.

The DownBeat Critics Poll named Davis 2017 Rising Star Pianist, 2018 Rising Star Artist, and 2020 winner of the piano category. In 2020, she was named Composer of the Year and Pianist of the Year by the Jazz Journalists Association. Davis' co-led album New Standards Vol. 1 won a Grammy Award for Best Jazz Instrumental Album.

== Personal life ==
Davis was formerly married to the drummer Jeff Davis. She married guitarist Nate Radley in 2012.

== Awards and honors ==
- 2016: DownBeat magazine: 25 for the Future
- 2021: Doris Duke Performing Artist Award

== Discography ==
An asterisk (*) indicates that the year is that of release.

=== As leader/co-leader ===
Year recorded	Title	Label	Personnel/Notes
2003	Lifespan	Fresh Sound	Sextet, with Tony Malaby (tenor sax, soprano sax), Russ Johnson (flugelhorn, trumpet), Jason Rigby (tenor sax, soprano sax, clarinet, bass clarinet), Eivind Opsvik (bass), Jeff Davis (drums)
2005	The Slightest Shift	Fresh Sound	Quartet, with Tony Malaby (tenor sax), Eivind Opsvik (bass), Jeff Davis (drums)
2005	Fiction Avalanche	Clean Feed	As part of the RIDD Quartet; with Jon Irabagon (sax), Reuben Radding (bass), Jeff Davis (drums)
2007	Rye Eclipse	Fresh Sound	Quartet, with Tony Malaby (tenor sax), Eivind Opsvik (bass), Jeff Davis (drums)
2008	Three	Clean Feed	As part of the band SKM; trio, with Stephen Gauci (sax), Michael Bisio (bass)
2009	Paradoxical Frog	Clean Feed	As part of the band Paradoxical Frog; trio, with Ingrid Laubrock (tenor sax), Tyshawn Sorey (drums)
2009	Good Citizen	Fresh Sound	Trio, with John Hebert (bass), Tom Rainey (drums)
2009	Aeriol Piano	Clean Feed	Solo piano
2011	Union	Clean Feed	As part of the band Paradoxical Frog; trio, with Ingrid Laubrock (tenor sax), Tyshawn Sorey (drums)
2012	Capricorn Climber	Clean Feed	Quintet, with Mat Maneri (viola), Ingrid Laubrock (sax), Trevor Dunn (bass), Tom Rainey (drums)
2012	Vermilion Tree	For Tune	As part of the band 3d; trio, with Tomasz Dąbrowski (trumpet, balkan horn), Andrew Drury (drums)
2012	Massive Threads	Thirsty Ear	Solo piano
2013*	Lark	Skirl	As part of the band Lark; quartet, with Ingrid Laubrock (tenor sax), Ralph Alessi (trumpet), Tom Rainey (drums)
2013	Waiting for You to Grow	Clean Feed	Trio, with John Hebert (bass), Tom Rainey (drums)
2014	Save Your Breath	Clean Feed	With Joachim Badenhorst, Andrew Bishop, Ben Goldberg, Oscar Noriega (bass clarinet), Gary Versace (organ), Nate Radley (guitar), Jim Black (drums)
2016*	Duopoly	Pyroclastic	Duos, with Don Byron (clarinet), Tim Berne (alto sax), Marcus Gilmore (drums), Billy Drummond (drums), Angelica Sanchez (piano), Craig Taborn (piano), Julian Lage (guitar), Bill Frisell (guitar)
2016	Octopus	Pyroclastic	Duo, with Craig Taborn (piano)
2017*	Asteroidea	Intakt	As part of the Borderlands Trio; with Stephan Crump (bass), Eric McPherson (drums)
2018	New American Songbooks Volume 2	Sound American	Vinyl only; 6 solo piano tracks: 1xKris Davis, 2xMatt Mitchell, 1xAruán Ortiz, 2xMatthew Shipp
2019*	Diatom Ribbons	Pyroclastic	With Esperanza Spalding (voice), J.D. Allen (tenor saxophone), Tony Malaby (tenor saxophone), Ches Smith (vibraphone), Nels Cline (guitar), Marc Ribot (guitar), Trevor Dunn (electric bass), Val Jeanty (turntable), Terri Lyne Carrington (drums)
2019*	Zoning	Astral Spirits/Monofonus Press	Trio, with Nick Fraser (drums), Tony Malaby (saxophone)
2020*	Bloodmoon	Intakt	Duo, with Ingrid Laubrock (saxophones)
2020*	Inland Empire	Clean Feed	with Øyvind Skarbø (drums), Fredrik Ljungkvist (saxophones), Ole Morten Vågan (double bass)
2022*	New Standards Vol. 1	Candid	Co-led with Nicholas Payton (trumpet), Matthew Stevens (guitar), Linda May Han Oh (bass), Terri Lyne Carrington (drums); various guests
2022	Diatom Ribbons Live at The Village Vanguard	Pyroclastic	Quintet, with Julian Lage (guitar), Val Jeanty (turntables, electronics), Trevor Dunn (bass), Terri Lyne Carrington (drums); in concert
2024	Run the Gauntlet	Pyroclastic	Trio, with Robert Hurst (bass), Johnathan Blake (drums)
2024	The Solastalgia Suite	Pyroclastic	with Lutosławski Quartet: Roksana Kwaśnikowska (first violin), Marcin Markowicz (second violin), Arur Rozmysłowicz (viola), and Maciej Młodawski (cello)

=== As sidewoman ===
Year recorded	Leader	Title	Label
2006	Rocket Engine	What Is This That Stands Before Me?	Loyal
2008*	Jon Irabagon	Outright!	Innova
2010*	Jeff Davis	We Sleep Outside	Loyal
2010*	Ingrid Laubrock	Anti-House	Intakt
2011*	Kermit Driscoll	Reveille	19/8
2011*	Tony Malaby	Novela	Clean Feed
2011*	Andrea Wolper	Parallel Lives	Jazzed Media
2013*	Ingrid Laubrock	Strong Place	Intakt
2013*	Eric Revis	City of Asylum	Clean Feed
2016*	Eric Revis	Crowded Solitudes	Clean Feed
2014*	Michael Musillami	Pride	Playscape
2014*	Matt Bauder	Nightshades	Clean Feed
2014*	Tom Rainey	Obbligato	Intakt
2015*	Ingrid Laubrock	Roulette of the Cradle	Intakt
2015*	Nick Fraser	Too Many Continents	Clean Feed
2015*	Devin Gray	Relative Resonance	Skirl
2017	Tom Rainey	Float Upstream	Intakt
2018*	Ingrid Laubrock	Contemporary Chaos Practices	Intakt
2018	Winged Serpents	Six Encomiums for Cecil Taylor	Tzadik
2019	Ken Vandermark	Momentum 4 (Consequent Duos: 2015>2019)	Audiographic (Box Set)
