= Forensic (disambiguation) =

Forensic science is the application of science to criminal and civil laws during investigation.

Forensic may also refer to:

- Forensic (2020 film), an Indian Malayalam-language psychological thriller film
- Forensic (2022 film), an Indian Hindi-language psychological crime thriller film
- Forensic (album), a 2005 album by Ingrid Laubrock
