= Rye Eclipse =

Studio album by Kris Davis
- Released: 2008
- Recorded: June 28, 2007
- Studio: Systems Two, Brooklyn
- Genre: Jazz
- Length: 43:23
- Label: Fresh Sound New Talent
- Producer: Kris Davis

Kris Davis chronology
| The Slightest Shift (2006) | Rye Eclipse (2008) | Paradoxical Frog (2010) |

Professional ratings
Review scores
| Source | Rating |
|---|---|
| Allmusic | 4.5/5 stars |

Rye Eclipse is an album by Canadian jazz pianist Kris Davis, which was recorded in 2007 and released on the Spanish Fresh Sound New Talent label.

== Reception ==
The All About Jazz review by Troy Collins states, "Elegantly balancing magnanimous collective expression with challenging pre-written forms, Rye Eclipse is a stellar example of creative improvised music."

In a review for JazzTimes Thomas Conrad notes that, "In return for patience and trust and a wide-open mind, Kris Davis' music offers uncommon creative adventure."

== Track listing ==
All compositions by Kris Davis except as indicated

1. "Rye Eclipse" – 10:31
2. "Wayne Oskar" – 4:11
3. "Prairie Eyes" – 5:29
4. "Minnow Bucket" – 2:43
5. "Empty Beehive" – 6:06
6. "Samuro" – 3:09
7. "Black Tunnel" – 7:30
8. "Rye Resurrected" (Kris Davis, Tony Malaby, Eivind Opsvik, Jeff Davis) – 3:44

== Personnel ==
- Kris Davis – piano
- Tony Malaby – saxophone
- Eivind Opsvik – bass
- Jeff Davis – drums
