= The Madness of Crowds =

The Madness of Crowds may refer to:

- Extraordinary Popular Delusions and the Madness of Crowds, an 1841 book by Charles Mackay
- The Madness of Crowds (Troy Donockley album), 2009
- The Madness of Crowds (Ingrid Laubrock album), 2011
- The Madness of Crowds: Gender, Race and Identity, a 2019 book by Douglas Murray

== See also ==
- The Wisdom of Crowds
