= Massive Threads =

Studio album by Kris Davis
- Released: 2013
- Recorded: October 21, 2012
- Studio: Tedesco Studios, Paramus, New Jersey
- Genre: Jazz
- Length: 41:36
- Label: Thirsty Ear
- Producer: Kris Davis

Kris Davis chronology
| Capricorn Climber (2013) | Massive Threads (2013) | Waiting for You to Grow (2014) |

Professional ratings
Review scores
| Source | Rating |
|---|---|
| Allmusic | 4/5 stars |

Massive Threads is the second solo album by Canadian jazz pianist Kris Davis, the follow-up to her first solo Aeriol Piano. It was recorded in 2012 and released on Thirsty Ear's Blue Series.

== Reception ==
The All About Jazz review by Mark Corroto states, "Davis' ability to link modern composers with jazz makes her music challenging and ultimately interesting. She melds Iannis Xenakis' abstractions with Keith Jarrett's expression."

In a review for JazzTimes Britt Robson notes that, "The imagery that comes out of her piano can be vividly cinematic, but her compositional style ensures that the sonic movie will likely be of the art-house variety."

The PopMatters review by Rob Cadwell says about the album, "Above all, its music that requires thought, cerebral in the sense that it’s 'wild mind' music – music played by a gifted pianist exploring the range of her instrument, with no boundaries."

== Track listing ==
All compositions by Kris Davis except as indicated

1. "Ten Exorcists" – 7:32
2. "Desolation and Despair" – 7:30
3. "Intermission Music" – 2:13
4. "Massive Threads" – 10:58
5. "Dancing Marlins" – 4:41
6. "Evidence" (Thelonious Monk) – 4:17
7. "Leaf-Like" – 1:57
8. "Slow Growing" – 2:28

== Personnel ==
- Kris Davis – piano
