= Hannah Marshall (musician) =

British musician and composer

Hannah Marshall is a British experimental and free improvising musician (cello, vocals) and composer.

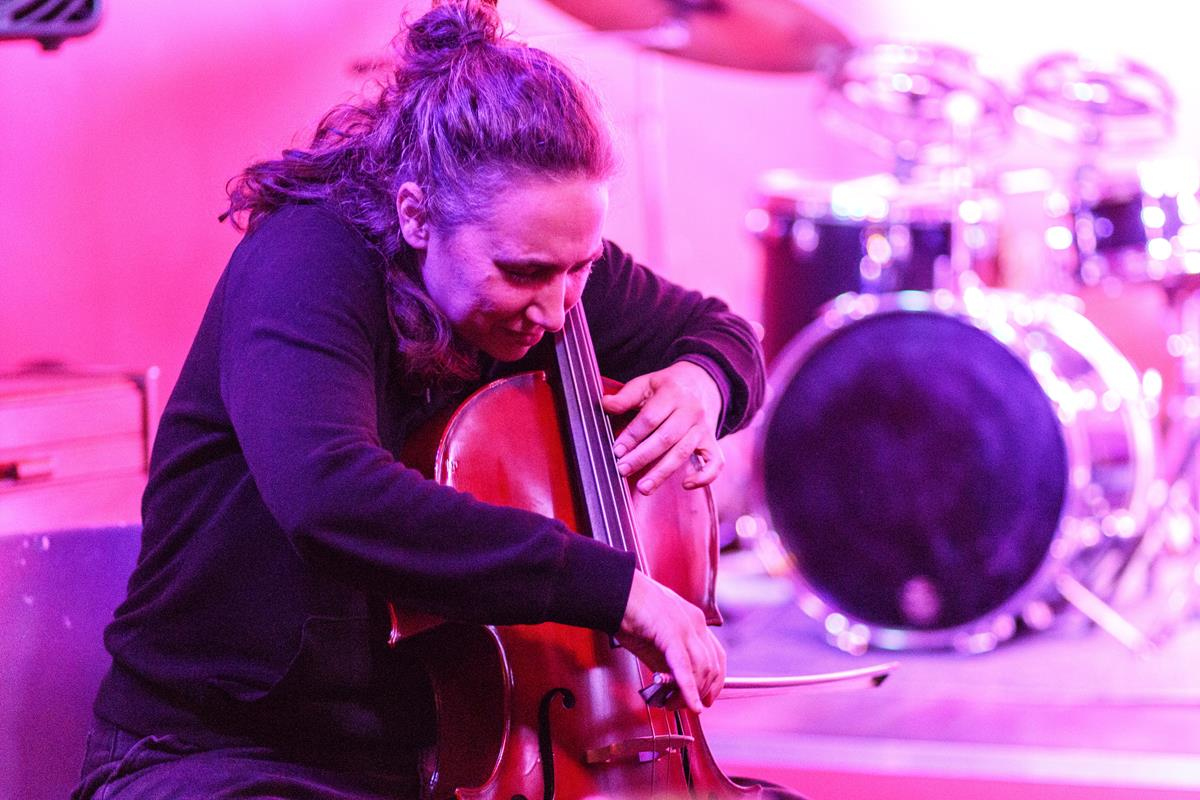
Hannah Marshall at Jazz Rumours Club in London 2019

== Biography ==
Marshall was born in London. She has played on the British and European improvisation scene since the 2000s, with among others Polar Bear, Terry Day, Alex Ward, Alexander Hawkins, Veryan Weston, Satoko Fukuda, Alison Blunt, Tony Marsh, Neil Metcalfe, Ingrid Laubrock, Rachel Musson and Dominic Lash;, Evan Parker, Luc Ex and Fred Frith. She also joined the Insub Meta Orchestra, the London Improvisers Orchestra and the Oxford Improvisers Orchestra. In 2012 she made a solo album Tulse Hill (Linear Obsessional Recordings). She is listed in 19 recording in the field of jazz between 2005 and 2014 by the discographer Tom Lord.

== Discography ==
- Trio of Uncertainty: Unlocked (Emanem, 2007), with Veryan Weston, Satoko Fukuda
- Barrel: Gratuitous Abuse (Emanem, 2011), with Alison Blunt, Ivor Kallin
- Veryan Weston / Ingrid Laubrock / Hannah Marshall : Haste (Emanem, 2012)
- Veryan Weston / Jon Rose / Hannah Marshall: Tuning Out (Emanem, 2015)
- Paul Dunmall, Phillip Gibbs, Alison Blunt, Neil Metcalfe, Hanna Marshall: I Look at You (FMR, 2015)
