= Good Citizen (album) =

Studio album by Kris Davis
- Released: 2010
- Recorded: May 28, 2009
- Studio: 58 N6 Media Labs, Brooklyn
- Genre: Jazz
- Length: 48:29
- Label: Fresh Sound New Talent
- Producer: Kris Davis

Kris Davis chronology
Paradoxical Frog (2010)	Good Citizen (2010)	Aeriol Piano (2011)

Professional ratings
Review scores
Source	Rating
Allmusic	4/5 stars

Good Citizen is an album by Canadian jazz pianist Kris Davis, which was recorded in 2009 and released on the Spanish Fresh Sound New Talent label.

== Reception ==
The All About Jazz review by Mark F. Turner states, "Good Citizen is yet another top notch release from a pianist/composer cut from the same cloth as Myra Melford and Geri Allen."

In a review for Wondering Sound, Charles Farrell notes that, "Kris Davis, with very able partners, is working in the new areas where jazz and modern classical music meet. Good Citizen bodes well for their successful ongoing merger."

== Track listing ==
All compositions by Kris Davis except as indicated

1. "Good Citizen" – 2:21
2. "Where Does That Tunnel Go" – 5:51
3. "Desert Prayers" – 6:28
4. "Sinking Orchird" – 5:05
5. "Recession Special" – 3:03
6. "Skinner Box" – 6:12
7. "B Side" – 3:47
8. "KTJ 1" (Davis, Hebert, Rainey) – 4:04
9. "Human Condition" – 4:16
10. "KTJ 2" (Davis, Hebert, Rainey) – 3:31
11. "The Iron Spider" – 3:51

== Personnel ==
- Kris Davis – piano
- John Hebert – bass
- Tom Rainey – drums
