= Float Upstream =

Studio album by Tom Rainey
- Released: 2017
- Recorded: January 19, 2017
- Studio: Brooklyn Recording, NYC
- Genre: Jazz
- Length: 43:23
- Label: Intakt
- Producer: Tom Rainey

Tom Rainey chronology
Hotel Grief (2015)	Float Upstream (2017)

Float Upstream is an album by American jazz drummer Tom Rainey, the second with his band Obbligato, which freely interpreted jazz standards. It was recorded in 2017 and released by Intakt Records.

== Reception ==
Professional ratings
Review scores
Source	Rating
Down Beat	4.5/5 stars

The Down Beat review by J.D. Considine says "The jazz standard may be the most renewable resource in popular culture. Obbligato, drummer Tom Rainey’s 'standards' band, takes an approach that respects the melody and harmonic structure of these compositions while employing strategies from collective and free improvisation."

The All About Jazz review by Dan McClenaghan states "Trumpeter Alessi and saxophonist Laubrock complement each others styles in fluid dances, by turns haunting or joyous, serpentine or terse—rarely unison. And always—in conjunction with this on-edge rhythm section—pushing the boundaries of straight ahead in the direction of freedom."

The Point of Departure review by Chris Robinson says "If nothing else, Float Upstream reminds us that in the hand of inventive and committed musicians, there's plenty of life left in songs that seem to have been played to death. This is a superb album."

== Track listing ==
1. "Stella by Starlight" (Victor Young) – 5:15
2. "Beatrice" (Sam Rivers) – 6:21
3. "What Is This Thing Called Love?" (Cole Porter) – 4:02
4. "What's New" (Bob Haggart) – 10:35
5. "There Is No Greater Love" (Isham Jones) – 6:48
6. "Float Upstream" (Obbligato) – 5:23
7. "I Fall in Love Too Easily" (Jule Styne) – 4:53

== Personnel ==
- Ralph Alessi – trumpet
- Ingrid Laubrock – saxophones
- Kris Davis – piano
- Drew Gress – bass
- Tom Rainey – drums
