= Hotel Grief =

Live album by Tom Rainey
- Released: 2015
- Recorded: December 30, 2013
- Venue: Cornelia Street Cafe, New York City
- Genre: Jazz
- Length: 60:06
- Label: Intakt

Tom Rainey chronology
Obbligato (2014)	Hotel Grief (2015)	Float Upstream (2017)

Hotel Grief is an album by American jazz drummer Tom Rainey, which was recorded in 2013 and released on the Swiss Intakt label. After two studio dates, this was the first live recording by his trio with saxophonist Ingrid Laubrock and guitarist Mary Halvorson.

== Reception ==
Professional ratings
Review scores
Source	Rating
Down Beat	4/5 stars

The Down Beat review by John Ephland states "Whatever the context and wherever these three take us, one can prepare for the unexpected. Jazz writer Bill Shoemaker makes that point clearly and eloquently in the liner notes: this is improvised music."

In a review for All About Jazz John Sharpe notes "Being so familiar with one another's styles means that even though collectively birthed the five selections possess a compelling internal logic, while their skills as improvisers mean they retain the freshness and unpredictability."

The Point of Departure review by Greg Buium says "Hotel Grief is a 61-minute set of free improvisation, but it is a cleverly structured, wonderfully coherent series of musical gestures.. It is a magnificent, and endlessly rewarding, date."

== Track listing ==
All compositions by Rainey, Halvorson and Laubrock.

1. "Last Overture" – 13:13
2. "Hotel Grief" – 16:45
3. "Briefly Lompoc" – 6:02
4. "Proud Achievements in Botany" – 18:42
5. "Mr. K.C." (for Keith Copeland) – 5:24

== Personnel ==
- Tom Rainey – drums
- Ingrid Laubrock – saxophones
- Mary Halvorson – guitar
