= Tyshawn Sorey =

American composer and multi-instrumentalist

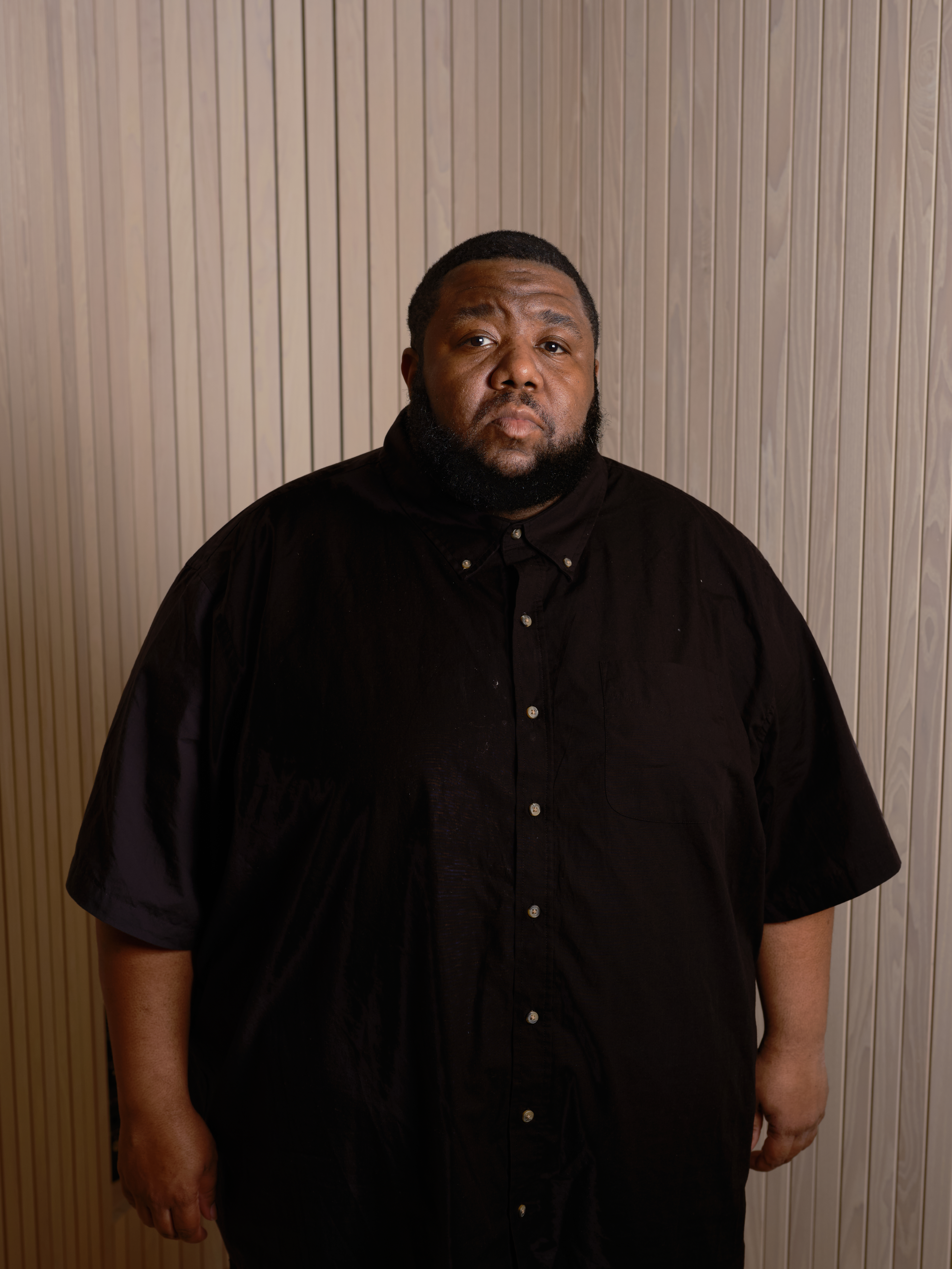
- Sorey in 2023

Background information
- Born: July 8, 1980 (age 45); Newark, New Jersey, U.S.
- Genres: Experimental music; classical; avant-garde jazz
- Occupations: Composer; musician; professor
- Instruments: Drums; percussion; trombone; piano; dungchen
- Years active: 2000–present
- Labels: Pi; Firehouse 12; 482 Music
- Website: tyshawnsorey.com

Tyshawn Sorey (born July 8, 1980) is an American composer, multi-instrumentalist, and professor of contemporary music.

Sorey has received accolades for performances, recordings, and compositions ranging from improvised solo percussion to opera, with work in best-of lists for both classical and jazz music. The New Yorker included Sorey on its annual "Notable Performances and Recordings" lists in 2017, 2018, 2019, and 2020; the pandemic-era entry was for premieres "cast in unconventional concerto form". His prolific output during a time of heavy restrictions on live performance led a New York Times critic to call him 2020's "composer of the year".

Sorey received the 2024 Pulitzer Prize for Music for his Adagio (for Wadada Leo Smith). He was named a MacArthur Fellow in 2017, a United States Artists Fellow in 2018, and in 2019 his song cycle for Josephine Baker, Perle Noire: Meditations for Josephine, was performed on the steps of the Metropolitan Museum of Art. His life and work have been the subject of features in publications including The New York Times, The New Yorker, The Wall Street Journal, NPR Music, and The Brooklyn Rail.

Sorey has recorded or performed with Wadada Leo Smith, Steve Coleman, Anthony Braxton, John Zorn, Steve Lehman, Joey Baron, Muhal Richard Abrams, Pete Robbins, Cory Smythe, Kris Davis, Vijay Iyer, Myra Melford, Dave Douglas, Butch Morris, and Sylvie Courvoisier.

In 2020, Sorey joined the faculty at the University of Pennsylvania as Presidential Assistant Professor of Music.

== Early life and career ==
Sorey grew up in Newark, New Jersey, and attended Newark Arts High School. As a teenager, he participated in the New Jersey Performing Arts Center Jazz for Teens program, through which he was awarded a Star-Ledger Scholarship.

In 2004, Sorey completed a B.Music in jazz studies and performance at William Paterson University, where he began as a classical trombone major before transferring to jazz drumming.

After a number of years recording and performing as a sideperson for artists including Vijay Iyer and Steve Lehman, Sorey's first album as leader was released on Firehouse 12 Records in 2007. The 2-CD That/Not features various configurations of Sorey, trombonist Ben Gerstein, pianist Cory Smythe, and bassist Thomas Morgan performing an array of works, from "Seven Pieces for Trombone Quartet" to the 43-minute "Permutations for Solo Piano". Sorey mainly plays drums, but also makes appearances on piano, including on the opening track. The material recorded for the album exceeded even the constraints of a two-disc set: a subsequent digital release of That/Not includes five additional pieces from the same sessions, including two "4 Hands" piano tracks.

Sorey's second album, Koan, was released in 2009. Featuring Todd Neufeld on electric and acoustic guitar and Thomas Morgan on bass and acoustic guitar, the 482 Music release was reviewed favorably by All About Jazz and the BBC, included in the 2009 Village Voice Jazz Critics’ Poll, and praised in NPR's "Take Five's Top 10 Jazz Records Of 2009".

In 2009, Sorey enrolled in a master’s program at Wesleyan University to study composition with Anthony Braxton. He completed his M.A. in 2011 and entered the doctoral program at Columbia University that fall. His enrollment at Columbia coincided with the release of his Oblique – I.

During the six years of doctoral study that followed, Sorey worked closely with George E. Lewis and Fred Lerdahl; off-campus, he recorded three albums with pianist Cory Smythe and bassist Chris Tordini. The first of these, Alloy, was released on Pi Recordings in 2014. For The Inner Spectrum of Variables, the trio was joined by three string performers: violinist Fung Chern Hwei, violist Kyle Armbrust, and cellist Rubin Kodheli. The Chicago Reader called The Inner Spectrum of Variables "one of the year's most arresting and ambitious recordings", and The Nation included the album in its "Ten Best Albums of 2016"; Nextbop's Rob Shepherd named it the best jazz album of the decade. In 2017, Sorey returned to the trio format for Verisimilitude, which was listed third in both the 2017 NPR Music Jazz Critics Poll and The New York Times Best Jazz Albums of 2017.

In 2017, Sorey completed his Doctor of Musical Arts in composition at Columbia. His dissertation comprises scores for his song cycle Perle Noire: Meditations for Josephine and an essay on the aesthetic practices and critical reception of the composition, its subject Josephine Baker, and the composer himself. Sorey cited Julia Bullock and members of the International Contemporary Ensemble as integral to his endeavor to "challenge the improvisation/composition binary and celebrate collaborative modeling"; in 2019, these artists joined Sorey in performing the piece on the steps of the Metropolitan Museum of Art.

After receiving his DMA, Sorey began his appointment as Assistant Professor of Music at Wesleyan University, where he established the university's Ensemble for New Music and taught courses on composition and improvised music. In the fall of 2017, he was awarded a MacArthur Fellowship for his work in music performance and composition.

In 2018, Sorey premiered Cycles of My Being, commissioned by Opera Philadelphia, Lyric Opera of Chicago, and Carnegie Hall, starring Lawrence Brownlee with poetry by Terrance Hayes. The piece centers on what it means to be a Black man living in America today and in 2020 was made into a film with Opera Philadelphia and released on its Digital Channel. In 2018 Sorey also released Pillars on Firehouse 12. In 2019 he was named Composer in Residence for the Seattle Symphony and Opera Philadelphia, and his duo album with Marilyn Crispell, The Adornment of Time, was released on Pi Recordings.

In March 2020, Sorey self-released his sextet's Unfiltered. That fall, he joined the faculty at the University of Pennsylvania as Presidential Assistant Professor of Music.

Beginning in 2019, Sorey embarked on several musical projects with Alarm Will Sound, including For George Lewis, a through-composed piece for sinfonietta commissioned by the ensemble, as well as several versions of autoschediasms, spontaneous compositions led by Sorey drawing on the instrumentalists' improvisational abilities. For George Lewis premiered in 2019 at Washington University in St. Louis and was released on an album with two versions of autoschediasms in 2021. One autoschediasm came from a live performance in St. Louis in 2019 and one was recorded remotely with musicians performing from five states during the COVID-19 pandemic. Sorey also recorded a holiday-themed autoschediasm based on Coventry Carol and Sussex Carol with Alarm Will Sound.

In 2022, Sorey’s composition Monochromatic Light (Afterlife), commissioned for the 50th anniversary of the Rothko Chapel, premiered there, followed by performances at the Park Avenue Armory in New York. The piece's instrumentation is similar to that of Morton Feldman’s Rothko Chapel.

== Musical style ==
Sorey's work is broadly experimental, drawing on a variety of influences, practices, and traditions. He opposes categorization of music by distinct genres, and in interviews and his doctoral thesis has questioned whether improvisation and composition are mutually exclusive.

Described as a musical shapeshifter, Sorey says he is invested less in "combining" genres than in movement across varying musical terrains: "For me, mobility represents not adhering to any particular musical model or institution. Unlike hybridity, mobility isn’t about fusion so much as the freedom to move between different models from moment to moment."

== Awards and honors ==
- 2008: Van Lier Fellowship
- 2008: Jerome Foundation Residency Grant
- 2012: Other Minds Composer Residency
- 2013: JazzDanmark / Danish Arts Foundation Artist Residency
- 2014: Shifting Foundation Grant
- 2015: Doris Duke Impact Award
- 2015: Jerome Foundation Residency Grant
- 2017: MacArthur Fellowship
- 2018: United States Artists Fellowship
- 2019: Seattle Symphony Composer in Residence
- 2019: Opera Philadelphia Composer in Residence
- 2024: Pulitzer Prize for Music

== Discography ==
=== As leader/composer ===
| Release year | Title | Label | Personnel |
|---|---|---|---|
| 2007 | That/Not | Firehouse 12 | Sorey (drums, piano), Ben Gerstein (trombone), Cory Smythe (piano, Wurlitzer), Thomas Morgan (bass) |
| 2009 | Koan | 482 Music | Sorey (drums and cymbals), Todd Neufeld (electric and acoustic guitar), Thomas Morgan (bass, acoustic guitar) |
| 2011 | Oblique – I | Pi | Sorey (drums, percussion), Loren Stillman (saxophone), John Escreet (piano), Todd Neufeld (guitar), Chris Tordini (bass) |
| 2014 | Alloy | Pi | Sorey (drums, percussion), Cory Smythe (piano), Chris Tordini (bass) |
| 2016 | The Inner Spectrum of Variables | Pi | Sorey (drumset), Cory Smythe (piano), Chris Tordini (contrabass), Fung Chern Hwei (violin), Kyle Armbrust (viola), Rubin Kodheli (cello) |
| 2017 | Verisimilitude | Pi | Sorey (drums, percussion), Cory Smythe (piano, toy piano, electronics), Chris Tordini (bass) |
| 2018 | Pillars | Firehouse 12 | Sorey (conductor, drum set, dungchen, percussion, trombone), Stephen Haynes (trumpet, flugelhorn, cornet, alto horn, small percussion), Ben Gerstein (trombone, melodica), Todd Neufeld (electric and acoustic guitar), Joe Morris (electric guitar, double bass), Carl Testa (double bass, electronics), Mark Helias (double bass ), Zach Rowden (double bass) |
| 2020 | Unfiltered | self-released | Sorey (drums), Nathan Reising (alto saxophone), Morgan Guerin (tenor saxophone), Lex Korten (piano), Sasha Berliner (vibraphone), Nick Dunston (bass) |
| 2022 | Mesmerism | Yeros7 Music | Sorey (drumset), Aaron Diehl (piano), Matt Brewer (contrabass) |
| 2022 | The Off-Off Broadway Guide to Synergism | Pi | Tyshawn Sorey Trio +1: Sorey (drums), Aaron Diehl (piano), Matt Brewer (bass), Greg Osby (alto saxophone) |
| 2023 | Continuing | Pi | Tyshawn Sorey Trio: Sorey (drums), Aaron Diehl (piano), Matt Brewer (bass) |
| 2024 | The Susceptible Now | Pi | Tyshawn Sorey Trio: Sorey (drums), Aaron Diehl (piano), Harish Raghavan (double bass); https://pirecordings.com/albums/the-susceptible-now/ |

=== As co-leader/composer ===
| Release year | Artist | Title | Label | Personnel |
|---|---|---|---|---|
| 2008 | Fieldwork | Door | Pi | Vijay Iyer (piano), Steve Lehman (saxophone), Sorey (drums) |
| 2010 | Paradoxical Frog | Paradoxical Frog | Clean Feed | Kris Davis (piano), Ingrid Laubrock (saxophone), Sorey (drums) |
| 2012 | Paradoxical Frog | Union | Clean Feed | Kris Davis (piano), Ingrid Laubrock (saxophone), Sorey (drums) |
| 2018 | Angelika Niescier / Christopher Tordini / Tyshawn Sorey | The Berlin Concert | Intakt | Angelika Niescier (saxophone), Christopher Tordini (bass), Sorey (drums) |
| 2019 | Tyshawn Sorey & Marilyn Crispell | The Adornment of Time | Pi | Sorey (drums, percussion), Marilyn Crispell (piano) |
| 2019 | Brad Barrett / Joe Morris / Tyshawn Sorey | Cowboy Transfiguration | Fundacja Słuchaj | Brad Barrett (double bass, cello), Joe Morris (guitar), Sorey (drums, percussion) |
| 2020 | Jennifer Curtis & Tyshawn Sorey | Invisible Ritual | New Focus | Jennifer Curtis (violin), Sorey (piano, percussion) |
| 2020 | Mike Sopko / Bill Laswell / Tyshawn Sorey | On Common Ground | M.O.D. Reloaded | Mike Sopko (guitar), Bill Laswell (bass), Sorey (drums) |
| 2021 | Vijay Iyer / Linda May Han Oh / Tyshawn Sorey | Uneasy | ECM Records | Vijay Iyer (piano), Linda May Han Oh (double bass), Sorey (drums) |
| 2024 | Vijay Iyer / Linda May Han Oh / Tyshawn Sorey | Compassion | ECM Records | Vijay Iyer (piano), Linda May Han Oh (double bass), Sorey (drums) |

=== As sideman and/or composer ===
With Alarm Will Sound

- For George Lewis / Autoschediasms (2021, Cantaloupe Music)

With Samuel Blaser

- Pieces of Old Sky (2009)

With David Binney

- Lifted Land (2013)

With Anthony Braxton

- Trillium E (2011)

With Steve Coleman

- Harvesting Semblances and Affinities (2010)
- The Mancy of Sound (2011)

With Armen Donelian

- Leapfrog (2011)

With Alexandra Grimal

- Andromeda (2012)

With Henry Grimes, Roberto Pettinato and Dave Burrell

- Purity (2012)

With Vijay Iyer

- Blood Sutra (Artists House, 2003)
- Far From Over (ECM, 2017)
- Uneasy (ECM, 2021)
- Compassion (ECM, 2024)

With Max Johnson

- Quartet (2012)

With Lauer Large

- Konstanz Suite (2009)

With Ingrid Laubrock

- Serpentines (2016)

With Steve Lehman

- Demian as Posthuman (2005)
- On Meaning (2007)
- Travail, Transformation and Flow (2009)
- Mise en Abîme (2014)

With Lage Lund

- Terrible Animals (2019)

With Roscoe Mitchell

- Duets with Tyshawn Sorey and Special Guest Hugh Ragin (Wide Hive, 2013)
- Bells for the South Side (ECM, 2017)

With Hafez Modirzadeh

- Facets (2021)

With Pascal Niggenkemper

- Pasàpas (2008)
- Urban Creatures (2010)

With Timuçin Şahin

- Bafa (2009)
- Inherence (2013)

With Samo Šalamon

- Kei's Secret (2006)

With Som Sum Sam

- Beauty Under Construction (2005)

With Angelica Sanchez Trio

- Float the Edge (Clean Feed, 2017)

With Sirone and Billy Bang

- Configuration (Silkheart, 2005)

With Craig Taborn

- Flaga: Book of Angels Volume 27 (Tzadik, 2016) composed by John Zorn

With John Zorn

- In the Hall of Mirrors (Tzadik, 2014)
- Valentine's Day (Tzadik, 2014)
- Hen to Pan (Tzadik, 2015)
