= Camino Cielo Echo =

Studio album by Tom Rainey
- Released: 2012
- Recorded: May 1, 2011
- Studio: Trout Recording, Brooklyn
- Genre: Jazz
- Length: 70:52
- Label: Intakt

Tom Rainey chronology
Pool School (2010)	Camino Cielo Echo (2012)	Obbligato (2014)

Camino Cielo Echo is the second album by American jazz drummer Tom Rainey, which was recorded in 2011 and released by Intakt Records. The record features the same trio as his debut album Pool School, with saxophonist Ingrid Laubrock and guitarist Mary Halvorson.

== Reception ==
The All About Jazz review by Mark Corroto states "The session sprouts in various directions, from the noisy thrashing of punk jazz to the almost ambient explorations of minimalism. Rainey spreads the composing duties between the three, but they seem to write with the same voice in mind."

In a review for Wondering Sound, Charles Farrell notes that "The players are all committed and resourceful — abundantly so — and they produce profound, jarring, and beautiful music. But they spend some of the time along the way having some fun, too."

== Track listing ==
1. "Expectation of Exception" (Rainey) – 6:45
2. "Mullet Toss" (Halvorson) – 6:16
3. "Mr and Mrs Mundane" (Laubrock) – 4:38
4. "Corporal Fusion" (Halvorson) – 3:45
5. "Arroyo Burrow" (Laubrock) – 6:29
6. "Strada Senza Nome" (Laubrock) – 4:24
7. "A Third Line into Little Miss Strange" (Halvorson) – 7:07
8. "Leapfrog" (Rainey) – 3:51
9. "Camino Cielo Echo" (Rainey) – 5:27
10. "Fluster" (Rainey) – 5:10
11. "Mental Stencil" (Laubrock) – 7:49
12. "Two Words" (Halvorson) – 4:49
13. "June" (Rainey) – 4:22

== Personnel ==
- Tom Rainey – drums
- Ingrid Laubrock – saxophones
- Mary Halvorson – guitar
