= Strong Place =

Studio album by Ingrid Laubrock
- Released: 2013
- Recorded: 2012
- Studio: Tedesco Studios, New York City
- Genre: Jazz
- Length: 57:13
- Label: Intakt

Ingrid Laubrock chronology
Union (2012)	Strong Place (2013)	Lark (2013)

Strong Place is the second album by German jazz saxophonist Ingrid Laubrock's Anti-House, a quintet with guitarist Mary Halvorson, pianist Kris Davis, bassist John Hébert and drummer Tom Rainey. It was recorded in 2012 and released on the Swiss Intakt label.

== Reception ==
Professional ratings
Review scores
Source	Rating
All About Jazz	5/5 stars
AllMusic	4.5/5 stars
The Guardian	4/5 stars

In his review for AllMusic, Dave Lynch says that the album "is filled with unpredictable twists and turns that keep the listener guessing, while the music nonetheless coheres through recurring motifs and the bandmembers' intuitive grasp of Laubrock's compositional and improvisational language."

The 5-star All About Jazz review by John Sharpe states, "Typically the German's charts avoid the obvious. Her convoluted thematic materials arise following an inscrutable inner logic, often juxtaposed with improvised elements, whether solo or group, as they intimate a tangled web of feelings, often within the space of a single number."

In a review for The Guardian, John Fordham notes that the group, "sounds more organised yet spontaneously conversational than ever. Strong Place represents a step-change for Anti-House, offering budding jazz composers fresh ideas and inspiration."

The Point of Departure review by Troy Collins states, "Laubrock's compositional sensibility balances impulsive spontaneity with a structural cohesiveness that occasionally sounds surreal; each of her sophisticated pieces embodies its own distinctive sound world. Although angular themes, oblique harmonies and fractious rhythms dominate her idiosyncratic writing, these works espouse a more consistent and contemplative mood than those found on the quintet’s debut."

Jim Macnie of The Village Voice wrote: "On Strong Place, the shifts aren't seismic—a collective grace moves the quintet's abstractions from episode to episode, and it's the connective logic that makes the pieces so engaging. From the leader's perpetually curious horn to Mary Halvorson's lithe squall to Tom Rainey's masterful jitters, the band is all about jazz cohesion."

Writing for The New York Times, Nate Chinen noted that Laubrock favors a "careful arrangement of ideas, and compositions with discrete parameters," as well as "chamber-group dynamics but shot through with rough texture and a vigilant avoidance of sentimentality." He singled out "Der Deichgraf" for praise, remarking: "The piece opens with a stern rumble of pianism before the ensemble gives halting chase, and then tapers off into balladic terrain without relaxing its intensity. (At one point the rhythm drops away to leave only Ms. Laubrock, circular-breathing a single note, and Ms. Halvorson, playing a wobbled-pitch version of the same.)"

== Track listing ==
All compositions by Ingrid Laubrock

1. "An Unfolding" – 7:48
2. "Der Deichgraf" – 10:25
3. "Count 'Em (for Richard Foreman)" – 9:58
4. "From Far Girl to Fabulous Vol. 1" – 5:36
5. "Alley Zen" – 4:25
6. "Strong Place (for Emanuella)" – 6:32
7. "Cup in a Teastorm (for Henry Threadgill)" – 6:01
8. "Here's to Love" – 6:28

== Personnel ==
- Ingrid Laubrock – tenor sax, soprano sax
- Mary Halvorson – guitar
- Kris Davis – piano
- John Hébert – bass
- Tom Rainey – drums
