= Serpentines (Ingrid Laubrock album) =

Studio album by Ingrid Laubrock
- Released: 2016
- Recorded: May 24, 2016
- Studio: Systems Two, Brooklyn
- Genre: Jazz
- Length: 53:32
- Label: Intakt
- Producer: Ingrid Laubrock

Ingrid Laubrock chronology
Buoyancy (2016)	Serpentines (2016)	Planktonic Finales (2017)

Serpentines is an album by German jazz saxophonist Ingrid Laubrock, which was recorded in 2016 and released by Intakt Records. It features a septet with an unusual line-up, with Miya Masaoka playing the koto, a traditional Japanese instrument, and individual instrumental parts manipulated electronically by Sam Pluta. Laubrock assembled the band (without guest trumpeter Peter Evans) for the Vision Festival 2015.

== Reception ==
Professional ratings
Review scores
Source	Rating
All About Jazz	4/5 stars
Down Beat	4/5 stars
The Free Jazz Collective	4/5 stars
Jazz Trail	A−

The Down Beat review by Peter Margasak notes, "Laubrock has created a work of remarkable density, both in terms of ideas and physical sound, and it yields greater dividends with each spin."

The All About Jazz review by John Sharpe states, "For this line up Laubrock takes her enigmatic charts for groups such as Anti-house and Ubatuba to another level, as improv jazz meets the classical avant-garde in pieces where mood and texture often trump individual pyrotechnics."

The Free Jazz Collective's Dan Sorrells wrote: "Serpentines is a record that demands to be played again; it's music that can be appreciated, but perhaps not fully understood after only one listen. It's a fitting and absorbing continuation of Laubrock's ongoing project: writing music that both excites and challenges some of the world's best improvisers."

Filipe Freitas of Jazz Trail commented: "Accurately composed and wrapped in fantastic chemistry, Serpentines reaffirms Laubrock as an indispensable figure in the contemporary jazz. New York is her home, but this music has no borders, showing solid, serpentine roads paved with freedom and discipline, expansions and contractions, composure and convulsion."

== Track listing ==
All compositions by Ingrid Laubrock.

1. "Pothole Analytics Pt. 1" – 4:44
2. "Pothole Analytics Pt. 2" – 5:42
3. "Chip in Brain" – 12:31
4. "Squirrels" – 15:15
5. "Serpentines" – 15:20

== Personnel ==
- Ingrid Laubrock – tenor sax, soprano sax, glockenspiel
- Peter Evans – piccolo trumpet, trumpet
- Miya Masaoka – koto
- Craig Taborn – piano
- Sam Pluta – electronics
- Dan Peck – tuba
- Tyshawn Sorey – drums
