= Aeriol Piano =

Studio album by Kris Davis
- Released: 2011
- Recorded: August 10, 2009
- Studios: Namouche Studios, Lisbon
- Genre: Jazz
- Length: 40:51
- Label: Clean Feed
- Producer: Kris Davis

Kris Davis chronology
Good Citizen (2010)	Aeriol Piano (2011)	Union (2012)

Aeriol Piano is a solo album by Canadian jazz pianist Kris Davis, which was recorded in 2009 and released on the Portuguese Clean Feed label.

== Reception ==
In a review for JazzTimes Lloyd Sachs states, "As she does throughout Aeriol Piano, Davis draws you in so effortlessly that the brilliance of what she's doing doesn't hit you until the piece has slipped past you."

The Point of Departure review by Troy Collins says, "A product of her influences, Davis seamlessly incorporates lessons learned from disparate sources, adapting the dissonant intervals of Cecil Taylor, probing lyricism of Paul Bley and understated minimalism of Morton Feldman into a singular style largely devoid of the clichés of the jazz tradition, such as block chords or left-handed bass lines."

== Track listing ==
All compositions by Kris Davis except as indicated

1. "All the Things You Are" (Jerome Kern) – 5:41
2. "Saturn Return" – 10:11
3. "A Different Kind of Sleep" – 8:25
4. "Good Citizen" – 4:54
5. "Beam the Eyes" – 3:36
6. "Stone" – 2:02
7. "The Last Time" – 3:36
8. "Work for Water" – 2:26

== Personnel ==
- Kris Davis – piano
