= Zurich Concert =

Live album by Ingrid Laubrock
- Released: 2014
- Recorded: December 10, 2011
- Venue: Rote Fabrik, Zürich
- Genre: Jazz
- Length: 73:33
- Label: Intakt
- Producer: Ingrid Laubrock

Ingrid Laubrock chronology
| Lark (2013) | Zurich Concert (2014) | And Other Desert Towns (2014) |

Zurich Concert is an album by German jazz saxophonist Ingrid Laubrock, which was recorded live in 2011 at the Rote Fabrik in Zürich and released on the Swiss Intakt label.

== Background ==
The Ingrid Laubrock Octet grew out of her London-based nine-piece ensemble Nein. In 2011 the saxophonist was offered the opportunity by Southwest German Radio (SWR) to work with her octet for several days at the "SWR NewJazz Meeting" in Baden-Baden, to develop a repertoire and present it on tour. It gave Laubrock the opportunity to bring together musicians from her new living situation in New York, where she has been based since 2009, and musicians from London who had already been members of her earlier nonet.

== Music ==
Laubrock brought eight compositions to the rehearsals in the SWR studio in Baden-Baden, seven of which are to be found in this CD. With the exception of "Blue Line & Sinker" which is a freely improvised introduction to the composition "Red Hook", some of the pieces are strictly notated and, due to their complexity were even conducted (by Tom Rainey). Most of the compositions, however, despite their precisely notated formal structures also leave large open spaces for improvisation. Laubrock decided to release on CD the Zurich live concert, recorded by the public broadcaster, instead of the studio recordings.

== Reception ==
Professional ratings
Review scores
| Source | Rating |
|---|---|
| All About Jazz | 4.5/5 stars |
| All About Jazz | 3/5 stars |
| Down Beat | 3/5 stars |
| The Free Jazz Collective | 4/5 stars |

The Down Beat review by Alain Drouot notes that "The lineup's wild card is Ted Reichman, whose haunting accordion leaves the strongest mark. His halo hovers over the soundscapes imagined by Laubrock, and his contributions greatly benefit the ensemble passages, which are by turn eerie, enigmatic or threatening."

The All About Jazz review by John Sharpe states "While the German has built her reputation as a distinctive voice on tenor and soprano saxophones and a compelling improviser, her writing is no less formidable and the seven numbers here share with her work for her group Anti-House an enigmatic and idiosyncratic shape, suggesting musical riddles."

The Free Jazz Collective's Paul Acquaro commented: "The overall recording is a smart assembly of varying textures and approaches and the diverse instrumentation makes for a fascinating listen. This is an album to take in whole, spend the hour and fifteen minutes that it demands to follow the ideas as they slowly appear and cohere."

Andy Boeckstaens of London Jazz News remarked: "Far from being a wild free-for-all, the concert contains music that is strictly notated. There is some space for improvisation, but it feels contained within a tightly-controlled structure... You won't go away humming any of these tunes, but Zürich Concert will remain in the memory long after the final notes have faded."

== Track listing ==
All compositions by Ingrid Laubrock except as indicated

1. "Glasses" – 4:58
2. "Novemberdoodle" – 11:04
3. "Blue Linwe & Sinker" (Ted Reichman, Tom Rainey, Drew Gress) – 2:41
4. "Chant" – 13:18
5. "Matrix" – 12:48
6. "Nightbus" – 18:29
7. "Der Zauberberg" – 10:15

== Personnel ==
- Ingrid Laubrock – soprano sax, tenor sax
- Mary Halvorson – guitar
- Tom Arthurs – trumpet
- Ted Reichman – accordion
- Liam Noble – piano
- Ben Davis – cello
- Drew Gress – bass
- Tom Rainey – drums, xylophone
