= Let's Call This... =

Studio album by Ingrid Laubrock & Liam Noble
- Released: 2006
- Studio: Mark Angelo Studios, London
- Genre: Jazz
- Length: 60:08
- Label: Babel

Ingrid Laubrock chronology
Forensic (2005)	Let's Call This... (2006)	Sleepthief (2008)

Liam Noble chronology
Romance Among the Fishes (2005)	Let's Call This... (2006)	Brubeck (2009)

Let's Call This... is an album by German jazz saxophonist Ingrid Laubrock and British pianist Liam Noble, which was released in 2006 on the British Babel label. It is an album consisting half of standard repertoire and half of entirely improvised pieces. Producer Seb Rochford adds electronic modifications to four of the originals.

== Reception ==
Professional ratings
Review scores
Source	Rating
All About Jazz	4.5/4 stars
The Guardian	3/5 stars
The Penguin Guide to Jazz Recordings	3.5/4 stars

The authors of The Penguin Guide to Jazz Recordings called the album "a terrific record in a potentially dull genre," and wrote: "these are formidable sessions... 'We See' and 'Duke's Ellington Sound of Love' are pleasantly rather than intrusively unorthodox and the originals manage to avoid being merely pretty-pretty."

The All About Jazz review by Chris May states: "After the whirlwind innovations of the last two years, Let's Call This... feels, in the best sense, like the restlessly exploratory Laubrock is pausing to reassess the eternal verities of classic tunes and changes, before setting off into unmapped territory once more."

In a review for The Guardian, John Fordham notes that "Laubrock has some Lee Konitz connections in her soft tone, cliche-avoidance and tendency to ponder, but on soprano throughout here, she adds a squawkier edge that occasionally suggests the late Steve Lacy."

== Track listing ==
1. "We See" (Thelonious Monk) – 5:15
2. "Spells" (Laubrock/Noble) – 3:35
3. "Alone Together" (Arthur Schwartz/Howard Dietz) – 7:21
4. "The Electric Ant" (Noble/Laubrock/Rochford) – 4:00
5. "Duke's Ellington Sound of Love" (Charles Mingus) – 9:58
6. "Let's Call This" (Thelonious Monk) – 6:32
7. "Peonies (After Hiroshige)" (Noble) – 3:02
8. "Cells" (Laubrock) – 1:41
9. "Angelica" (Duke Ellington) – 7:43
10. "I'm at Your Throat Now" (Laubrock/Noble) – 3:43
11. "Subconscious-Lee" (Lee Konitz) – 3:38
12. "Bells" (Laubrock/Noble) – 3:40

== Personnel ==
- Ingrid Laubrock – soprano sax
- Liam Noble – piano
