= Tony Malaby =

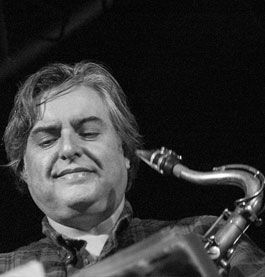

Background information
- Born: January 2, 1964 (age 61); Tucson, Arizona, U.S.
- Genres: Jazz
- Occupation: Musician
- Instrument: Saxophone
- Labels: Arabesque, Sunnyside, Clean Feed, Marge
- Website: www.tonymalaby.com

Tony Malaby (born January 12, 1964) is an American jazz tenor saxophonist.

Malaby was born in Tucson, Arizona. He moved to New York City in 1995 and played with several notable jazz groups, including Charlie Haden’s Liberation Music Orchestra, Paul Motian's Electric Bebop Band, Mark Helias's Open Loose, Fred Hersch's Trio + 2 and Walt Whitman project. He also played with bands led by Mario Pavone, Chris Lightcap, Bobby Previte, Tom Varner, Marty Ehrlich, Angelica Sanchez, Mark Dresser, and Kenny Wheeler. Other collaborators included Tom Rainey, Christian Lillinger, Ben Monder, Eivind Opsvik, Nasheet Waits, Samo Šalamon and Michael Formanek. His first album as a co-leader was Cosas with Joey Sellers.

The New York Times has called him one "of the best players of their generation."

== Gallery ==
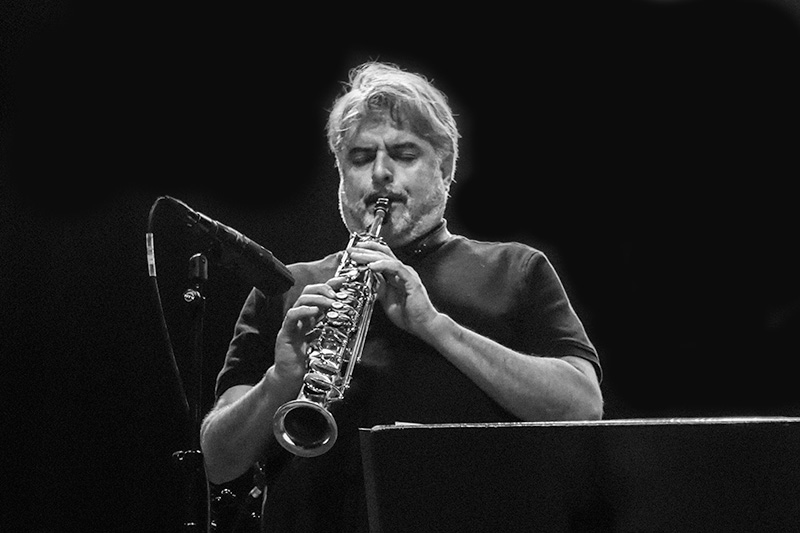
Denmark 2017.
Photos Hreinn Gudlaugsson

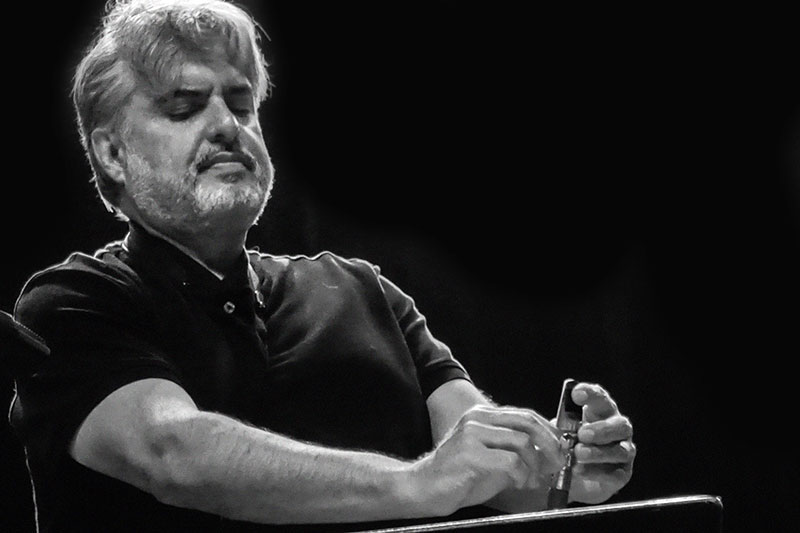
Denmark 2017

== Discography ==
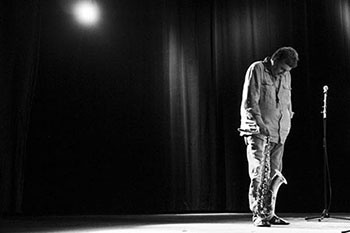
Tony Malaby

=== As leader ===
- Sabino (Arabesque, 2000)
- Apparitions (Songlines, 2003)
- Adobe (Sunnyside, 2004)
- Tamarindo (Clean Feed, 2007)
- Warblepeck (Songlines, 2008)
- Paloma Recio (New World, 2009)
- Voladores (Clean Feed, 2009)
- Tamarindo Live (Clean Feed, 2010)
- Novela (Clean Feed, 2011)
- Somos Agua (Clean Feed, 2014)
- Scorpion Eater (Clean Feed, 2014)
- Incantations (Clean Feed, 2016)
- The Cave of Winds (Pyroclastic, 2022)

=== As sideman ===
with Damian Allegretti

- Stoddard Place

with Kris Davis

- Lifespan (Fresh Sound, 2004)
- The Slightest Shift (Fresh Sound, 2006)
- Rye Eclipse (Fresh Sound, 2008)
- Diatom Ribbons (Pyroclastic Records, 2019)

With Charlie Haden Liberation Music Orchestra

- Not in Our Name (Verve, 2005)
- Time/Life (Impulse!, 2016)

with Pandelis Karayorgis and Mat Maneri

- Disambiguation (Leo, 2002)

with Paul Motian

- Garden of Eden (ECM, 2004)

With Mario Pavone

- Mythos (Playscape, 2002)
- Orange (Playscape, 2003)
- Boom (Playscape, 2004)
- Ancestors (Playscape, 2008)

with Samo Šalamon

- Two Hours (Fresh Sound New Talent, 2006)
- Traveling Moving Breathing (Clean Feed Records, 2018)

With Josh D. Reed, Matt Smiley and Ron Coulter

- Continental Divide (Kreating SounD, 2024)
