= The Adornment of Time =

Live album by Tyshawn Sorey and Marilyn Crispell
- Released: 2019
- Recorded: October 21, 2018
- Venue: The Kitchen, New York City
- Studio: 1:04:57
- Genre: Free jazz
- Label: Pi Recordings; PI83

The Adornment of Time is a live album by percussionist Tyshawn Sorey and pianist Marilyn Crispell.

== Background ==
It was recorded at The Kitchen in New York City in October 2018, and was released in 2019 by Pi Recordings. The album features an hour-long piece that was freely improvised; nothing was determined or discussed beforehand.

== Reception ==
=== Critical response ===
Professional ratings
Review scores
Source	Rating
AllMusic	4.5/5 stars
DownBeat	4/5 stars
Pitchfork	8/10 stars
All About Jazz	4.5/5 stars

In a review for AllMusic, Thom Jurek wrote: "The Adornment of Time... is among the most aptly titled improvised recordings in many years... Besides the instruments, audience, and the performance space, what exists between and around these two is time: Forever passing, ever present, and always falling forward into the next moment... For nearly 65 minutes, their interaction begets inquiry and investigation that in turn begets declamations, questions, and discoveries that serve to propel communication -- with silence, with one another, and with time itself -- deeper and wider than either of the participants could have conceived... By the time they conclude..., they have traveled far and taken their listeners with them through a pregnant sense of time painted with emotional, spiritual, and intellectual ideas and profound feelings. This is as much as any musical encounter can offer, let alone provide, and Sorey and Crispell deliver both."

Ammar Kalia, in a review for DownBeat, stated: "There is a type of improvisation that seems almost mystical to witness. It's full-blown, free-flowing and intensely narrative, the arc of which is only established as the players play and we listen along, trying to keep up. And it's the essence of drummer Tyshawn Sorey and pianist Marilyn Crispell's work together... A work this instinctual and eminently present-tense can seem difficult to unpack from the perspective of a recording, yet within it lies the key to the jazz form: the synaptic rushes of musicians communicating purely in the moment."

Writing for Pitchfork, Seth Colter Walls commented: "The Adornment of Time doesn't merely present two talented musicians in a room, improvising at the same time. Instead, the album makes good on ideals at the heart of the free-improv tradition—including equality and adaptiveness—that are often paid lip service, if not always easily heard."

Karl Ackermann of All About Jazz called the album "extraordinary," and remarked: "Sorey and Crispell are known for their exceptional ability to listen and to empathize with colleagues. These personal traits make this album a benchmark for immediate creativity... they create outside any obvious genre, but with a concentration on many musical foundations. The audience is spellbound—silent for the entire piece; it's likely many listeners will react the same way. Highly recommended."

Michael Rosenstein of Dusted Magazine stated that the "notion of 'mindful decision making' is evident throughout as the two build measured waves of tension and release. The way they steadily mount to crescendos of dynamics and density and abate into sections of extended composure is riveting."

Adam Shatz, writing for The New York Review, described the album as "gorgeous," and stated that, over the duration of the piece, "the collaboration’s architecture comes into radiant focus, gradually acquiring such physical power that you feel a kind of shock, and even sorrow, when it ends."

In an article for WBGO, Nate Chinen referred to the album as "mesmerizing," and praised its "grave, shimmering beauty." He commented: "The Adornment of Time is an experiential creation, and for those of us who couldn't be in the audience on that evening, the album is our chronicle. The only option is to devour it whole."

== Track listing ==
1. "The Adornment of Time" – 1:04:57

== Personnel ==
- Marilyn Crispell – piano
- Tyshawn Sorey – drums, percussion
