= Obbligato (album) =

Studio album by Tom Rainey
- Released: 2014
- Recorded: February 28, 2013
- Studio: Systems Two, Brooklyn
- Genre: Jazz
- Length: 52:04
- Label: Intakt
- Producer: Tom Rainey

Tom Rainey chronology
Camino Cielo Echo (2012)	Obbligato (2014)	Hotel Grief (2015)

Obbligato is the third album by American jazz drummer Tom Rainey, which was recorded in 2013 and released by Intakt Records. He leads a quintet with the same lineup as the collective LARK quartet (Rainey on drums, Ralph Alessi on trumpet, Ingrid Laubrock on sax and Kris Davis on piano), expanded by Drew Gress on bass. The album features a selection of standards, most of them taken from the Great American Songbook.

== Reception ==
Professional ratings
Review scores
Source	Rating
Down Beat	4/5 stars

The Down Beat review by Peter Margasak says that "The most satisfying quality of the session is hearing the band members expertly blend together, suggesting the agile and empathic lines of West Coast jazz applied to fuzzy melodic shapes."

The All About Jazz review by Troy Collins states "Though unconstrained by formal concerns, the musicians always maintain some key aspects of the underlying structure of each piece, be it melody, harmony or rhythm. Such awareness of the tradition enriches the depth of their interpretations, making Obbligato one of the most persuasive modern recordings of established standards in some time."

In a review for JazzTimes, Lloyd Sachs notes that "While the melodies are sometimes minimized, sometimes disguised, they always illuminate the core of the tunes."

== Track listing ==
1. "Just in Time" (Jule Styne) – 3:10
2. "In Your Own Sweet Way" (Dave Brubeck) – 6:16
3. "Long Ago and Far Away" (Jerome Kern) – 5:13
4. "Reflections" (Thelonious Monk) – 5:21
5. "Secret Love" (Sammy Fain) – 3:25
6. "Prelude to a Kiss" (Duke Ellington) – 7:56
7. "Yesterdays" (Jerome Kern) – 6:10
8. "If I Should Lose You" (Ralph Rainger) – 4:58
9. "You Don't Know What Love Is" (Gene de Paul) – 6:59
10. "Just in Time Again" (Jule Styne) – 2:36

== Personnel ==
- Ralph Alessi – trumpet
- Ingrid Laubrock – sax
- Kris Davis – piano
- Drew Gress – bass
- Tom Rainey – drums
