= Anti-House =

Studio album by Ingrid Laubrock
- Released: 2010
- Recorded: January 16, 2010
- Studios: Trout Recording, New York City
- Genre: Jazz
- Length: 72:45
- Label: Intakt

Ingrid Laubrock chronology
Paradoxical Frog (2010)	Anti-House (2010)	The Madness of Crowds (2011)

Anti-House is the eponymous debut album by German jazz saxophonist Ingrid Laubrock's band with guitarist Mary Halvorson, bassist John Hébert, drummer Tom Rainey and pianist Kris Davis, credited as a guest on about half the pieces. It was recorded in 2010 and released on the Swiss Intakt label. In the summer of 2008 Laubrock relocated from London to New York, where she participated in the collective trio Paradoxical Frog, but this was her first recording as leader in the U.S.

== Reception ==
Professional ratings
Review scores
Source	Rating
All About Jazz	5/5 stars
Down Beat	3/5 stars
The Guardian	3/5 stars

The Down Beat review by Bill Meyer says, "The more time one spends with this record, the more it impresses. Beyond the rigorous playing, each of its 14 tracks abounds with surprise changes in shape and direction. But while it commands admiration, it’s hard to love; the contrasts and complexities don’t really add up to some greater whole."

The 5-star All About Jazz review by Chris May states, "Anti-House is Laubrock's most all-round satisfying album to date, a cascade of gritty beauty, some of it quite savage, which harnesses the enduring appeal of Forensic to the discoveries that have followed it."

In a review for The Guardian, John Fordham says, "Though some of the motif-swapping strategies sound a shade robotic, Anti-House is a vivid indication of Laubrock's growing independence – and Halvorson's Derek Baileyesque scrambling runs, Hendrix distortions, wild on-the-fly detunings and massaged jazz-guitar grooves offer constant diversions."

A writer for the Morning Star commented: "this diverse group of men and women play like a dream... Altogether, this is an album of many creative delights."

== Track listing ==
All compositions by Ingrid Laubrock except as indicated

1. "Slopwfish Glowfish" – 4:15
2. "Flowery Prison Cell" (Laubrock, Halvorson, Hébert, Rainey, Davis) – 1:15
3. "Messy Minimum" (Laubrock, Halvorson, Hébert) – 1:38
4. "Quick Draw" – 7:40
5. "Funhouse Glockwork" – 6:06
6. "Tex & Clementine" – 6:00
7. "Anti-House" – 9:58
8. "Is Life Anything Like This" (Laubrock, Halvorson, Hébert, Rainey, Davis) – 1:48
9. "Big Band" (Laubrock, Halvorson, Hébert, Rainey, Davis) – 0:55
10. "Big Crunch" – 5:42
11. "Betterboon" – 6:47
12. "Tom Can't Sleep" (Laubrock, Rainey) – 6:07
13. "Oh Yes" – 6:43
14. "Mona Lisa Trampoline" – 7:51

== Personnel ==
- Ingrid Laubrock – tenor sax, soprano sax
- Mary Halvorson – guitar
- John Hébert – bass
- Tom Rainey – drums, glockenspiel
- Kris Davis – piano
