= Planktonic Finales =

Studio album by Stephan Crump, Ingrid Laubrock, Cory Smythe
- Released: 2017
- Recorded: August 13, 2015
- Studio: Oktaven Audio, Yonkers, New York
- Genre: Jazz
- Length: 53:17
- Label: Intakt
- Producer: Stephan Crump, Ingrid Laubrock, Cory Smythe

Ingrid Laubrock chronology
Serpentines (2016)	Planktonic Finales (2017)

Planktonic Finales is an album by a collective trio consisting of bassist Stephan Crump, saxophonist Ingrid Laubrock and pianist Cory Smythe. It was recorded in 2015 and released by Intakt Records.

== Reception ==
Professional ratings
Review scores
Source	Rating
All About Jazz	4.5/5 stars
Down Beat	3/5 stars
The Free Jazz Collective	5/5 stars
Jazzwise	4/5 stars

The Down Beat review by Carlo Wolff states, "The sonics are interesting in a workshop way, but few of the 11 tunes are memorable for much more than process. While that can be intellectually stimulating, one eventually craves a melodic statement rather than a musical 'trialogue'."

In an article for Jazzwise, Selwyn Harris wrote: "The free-flowing energy between the three participators is highly tangible. There's a melody-driven aspect connected to the impressionistic and abstract collective ethos forming the narrative of these pieces. Containing both intense drama and conversational intimacy, it's a very listenable recording that draws from a diverse vocabulary."

John Sharpe of All About Jazz noted the musicians' "deep listening and keen interaction where nothing is off limits," and commented: "there's a chamber sensibility inherent in the instrumentation, and the overall feel is intimate and for the most part introspective, with at times as much silence as sound... it's a supreme case of empathetic music making in which respect doesn't cow either adventure or surprise."

The editors of The Free Jazz Collective awarded the album a full 5 stars, and reviewer Troy Dostert remarked: "it is readily apparent from the opening moments of the record that these musicians have an extraordinary rapport... beauty is to be found through the players' careful, precise, and exceedingly generous ability to respond fruitfully and sympathetically to each move the other makes."

Point of Departure's John Litweiler praised Laubrock's playing, writing: "Her sax sounds convey intimacy. Her soprano sound is full-blooded; she makes that obstinate horn into a truly expressive instrument. Sometimes she does plays extreme sounds on her tenor – honks, screams, low subtones – but mainly she has a big sound that, again, moves naturally."

Writing for Dusted Magazine, Derek Taylor stated: "The context here has direct and immediately discernable ties to Euro free impov with tone and texture taking on as much importance as mappable structure. Conventional melody, rhythm and harmony are peripheral considerations... [the] variability and mobility of means and ends proves right in tune with the attributes of the ocean-going organisms referenced in the album's title."

== Track listing ==
All music by Stephan Crump, Ingrid Laubrock, Cory Smythe

1. "With Eyes Peeled" – 5:49
2. "Tones for Climbing Plants" – 7:04
3. "Sinew Modulations" – 11:46
4. "Through the Forest" – 3:56
5. "A House Alone" – 2:42
6. "Three-Panel" – 6:11
7. "Submerged (Personal) Effects" – 3:40
8. "Pulse Memory" – 2:26
9. "Bite Bright Sunlight" – 1:51
10. "As if in its Throat" – 4:07
11. "Inscribed in Trees" – 3:45

== Personnel ==
- Stephan Crump – acoustic bass
- Ingrid Laubrock – tenor sax, soprano sax
- Cory Smythe – piano
