= Ingrid Laubrock =

German jazz saxophonist

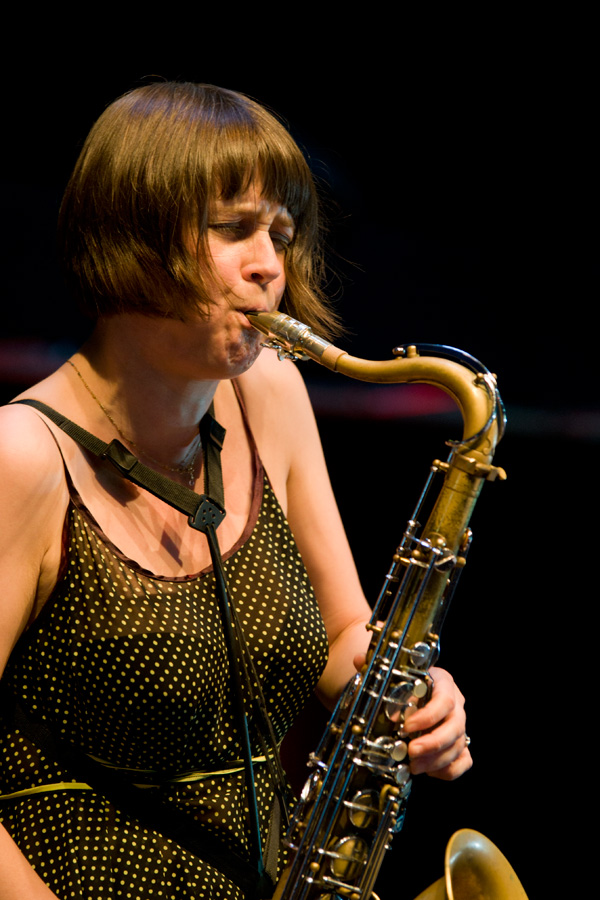
- Laubrock performing in 2012

Background information
- Born: 24 September 1970 (age 55); Stadtlohn, Germany
- Genres: Avant-garde jazz, free jazz
- Occupation: Musician
- Instrument: Saxophone
- Years active: 1994–present
- Labels: Candid, Intakt
- Website: ingridlaubrock.com

Ingrid Laubrock (born 24 September 1970) is a German jazz saxophonist, who primarily plays tenor saxophone but also performs and records on soprano, alto, and baritone saxophones.

She studied with Jean Toussaint, Dave Liebman and at the Guildhall School of Music and Drama.

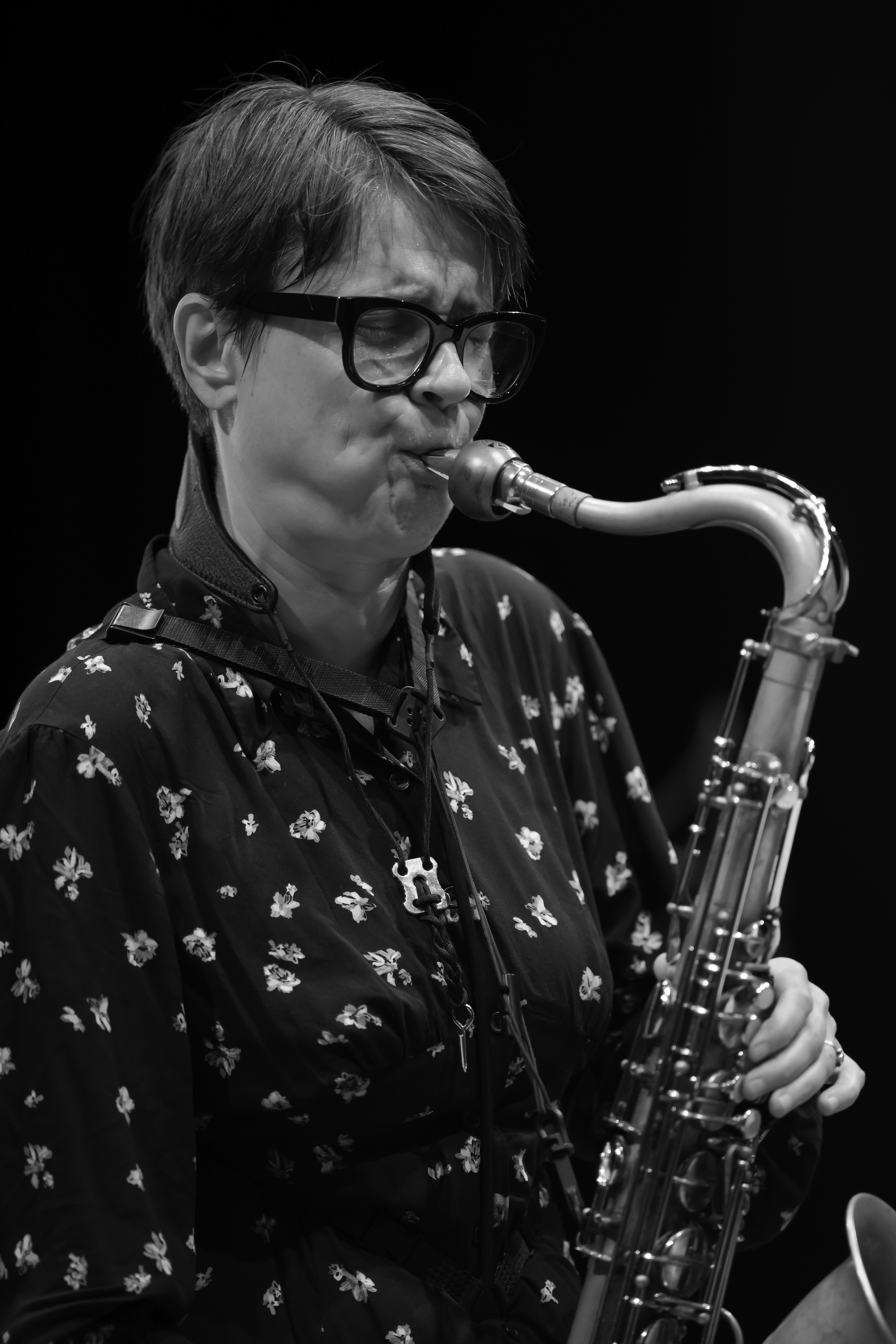
Laubrock performing in 2024, photo by Marek Lazarski

Laubrock moved to London, England in 1989, and became a member of the F-IRE Collective. In 2008 she moved to New York City.

In 1998, she released her first solo album Who Is It? and was nominated for the 'Rising Star of the Year' award at the 1999 BT Jazz Awards. She was also nominated for the BBC Award 'Rising Star' in 2005 and in 2009 won the SWR Jazz Award for her recording Sleepthief, featuring pianist Liam Noble and drummer Tom Rainey (her husband). They recorded a 2011 album called The Madness of Crowds.

She has played and recorded with Brazilian singer Monica Vasconcelos' band NÓIS and the Brazilian quartet NÓIS4 of which she is a founding member. Other musicians she has made guest appearances with include Kenny Wheeler, Norma Winstone, Polar Bear, Siouxsie and the Banshees, Scott Fields, Penny Rimbaud, and Anthony Braxton. In 2020 she will play with Kris Davis at the first edition of the Monheim Triennale.

The composition ″Vogelfrei″ for orchestra, soloists and choir from the album Contemporary Chaos Practices was included in The New York Times' 25 Best Classical Music Tracks of 2018 by NY Times critic Seth Colter Walls.

== Discography ==
=== As leader/co-leader ===
Release year	Title	Label	Personnel/Notes
1998	Who Is It?	Candid	
2001	Some Time	Candid	
2005	Forensic	F-IRE Collective	Quintet with Karin Merchant (piano), Ben Davis (cello), Larry Bartley (bass), Tom Skinner (drums); guest: Julian Siegel (bass clarinet)
2006	Let's Call This...	Babel Label	Duo with Liam Noble (piano)
2008	Sleepthief	Intakt	Trio with Liam Noble (piano), Tom Rainey (drums)
2010	Paradoxical Frog	Clean Feed	As part of the band Paradoxical Frog; trio, with Kris Davis (piano), Tyshawn Sorey (drums)
2010	Anti-House	Intakt	As the band Anti-House; with Mary Halvorson (guitar), John Hébert (bass), Tom Rainey (drums, glockenspiel); guest: Kris Davis (piano)
2011	The Madness of Crowds	Intakt	As the band Sleepthief; trio with Liam Noble (piano), Tom Rainey (drums)
2012	Catatumbo	Babel	Trio with Olie Brice (bass), Javier Carmona (drums)
2012	Haste	Emanem	Trio with Veryan Weston (piano), Hanna Marshall (cello)
2012	Union	Clean Feed	As part of the band Paradoxical Frog; trio, with Kris Davis (piano), Tyshawn Sorey (drums)
2013	Strong Place	Intakt	As the band Anti-House; quintet, with Mary Halvorson (guitar), Kris Davis (piano), John Hébert (bass), Tom Rainey (drums)
2013	Lark	Skirl	As part of the band Lark; quartet, with Kris Davis (piano), Ralph Alessi (trumpet), Tom Rainey (drums)
2014	Zurich Concert	Intakt	Octet with Mary Halvorson (guitar), Tom Arthurs (trumpet), Ted Reichman (accordion), Liam Noble (piano), Ben Davis (cello), Drew Gress (bass), Tom Rainey (drums, xylophone)
2014	And Other Desert Towns	Relative Pitch	Duo with Tom Rainey (drums)
2015	Roulette of the Cradle	Intakt	As the band Anti-House; quintet, with Mary Halvorson (guitar), Kris Davis (piano), John Hébert (bass), Tom Rainey (drums); guest: Oscar Noriega (clarinet)
2015	Ubatuba	Firehouse 12	As the band Ubatuba; quintet, with Tim Berne (alto sax), Dan Peck (tuba), Ben Gerstein (trombone), Tom Rainey (drums)
2016	Live @ The Jazz Happening Tampere	Relative Pitch	As the band Perch Hen Brock & Rain; quartet with Ab Baars (reeds), Ig Henneman (viola), Tom Rainey (drums)
2016	Buoyancy	Relative Pitch	Duo with Tom Rainey (drums)
2016	Serpentines	Intakt	Septet with Peter Evans (trumpet), Miya Masaoka (koto), Craig Taborn (piano), Sam Pluta (electronics), Dan Peck (tuba), Tyshawn Sorey (drums)
2017	Planktonic Finales	Intakt	Trio with Stephan Crump (bass), Cory Smythe (piano)
2017	Utter	Relative Pitch	Duo with Tom Rainey (drums)
2018	Contemporary Chaos Practices – Two Works for Orchestra and Soloists	Intakt	Quartet with Nate Wooley (trumpet), Mary Halvorson (guitar), Kris Davis (piano)
2019	Channels	Intakt	Trio with Stephan Crump (bass), Cory Smythe (piano)
2019	TISM	RogueArt	Quartet with Sylvie Courvoisier (piano), Mark Feldman (violin), Tom Rainey (drums)
2019	Kasumi	Intakt	Duo with Aki Takase
2020	Stir Crazy	–	Duo with Tom Rainey (drums)
2020	Blood Moon	Intakt	Duo with Kris Davis
2020	Dreamt Twice, Twice Dreamt – Music For Chamber Orchestra And Small Ensemble	Intakt	
2023	The Last Quiet Place	Pyroclastic	Sextet with Mazz Swift (violin), Tomeka Reid (cello), Brandon Seabrook (guitar), Michael Formanek (bass), Tom Rainey (drums)

=== As sidewoman ===
Release year	Leader	Title	Label
2013	Kris Davis	Capricorn Climber	Clean Feed
2013	Mary Halvorson	Illusionary Sea	Firehouse 12
2014	Max Johnson	The Prisoner	NoBusiness
2012	Living by Lanterns	New Myth/Old Science	Cuneiform
2010	Tom Rainey	Pool School	Clean Feed
2012	Tom Rainey	Camino Cielo Echo	Intakt
2014	Tom Rainey	Obbligato	Intakt
2015	Tom Rainey	Hotel Grief	Intakt
2017	Tom Rainey	Float Upstream	Intakt
2015	Nate Wooley	Battle Pieces	Relative Pitch
2015	Sara Serpa	Close Up	Clean Feed
2019	Tom Rainey	Combobulated	Intakt
2019	Robert Landfermann	TOPAZ	klaengrecords
2020	Scott Fields	Seven Deserts	New World Records
2025	Nels Cline	Consentrik Quartet	Blue Note
