= Caterina Palazzi =

Italian bass player

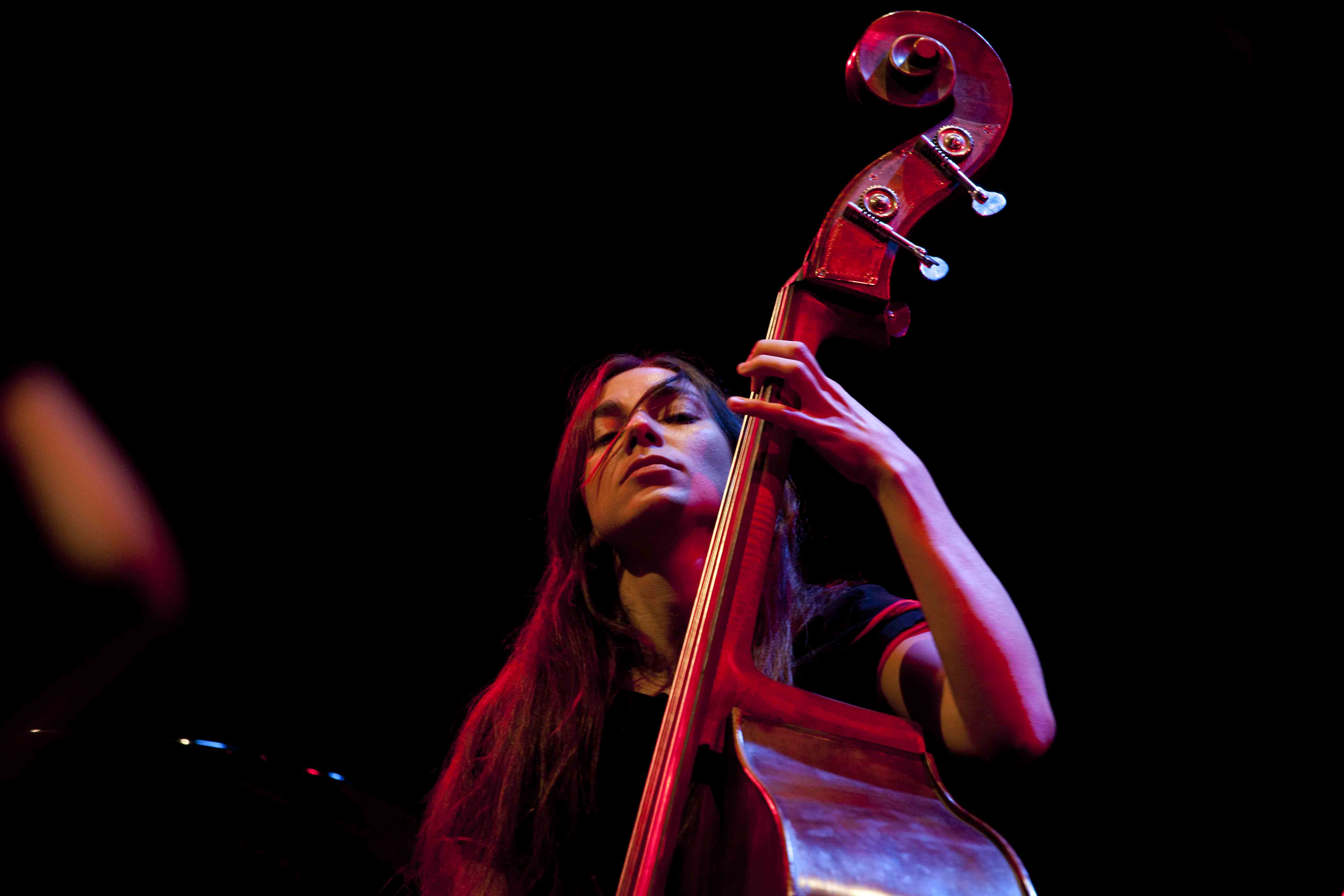
Caterina Palazzi in 2011

Caterina Palazzi is an Italian double bass player. She's known as the leader of the Italian band Sudoku Killer, which plays jazz, psychedelic rock, and noise music. In 2010 she won the Jazzit Award as best italian jazz composer. In 2022 she is mentioned as one of 20 best ever italian bassists on Rockit magazine.

== Biography ==
Caterina Palazzi was born in Rome. She was the guitarist for the punk rock group the Barbie Killers. Beginning in 2000, she moved closer to jazz while attending the DAMS University (Arts, Music, and Show). From 2002 she attended the professional course at Saint Louis College of Music of Rome.

She is the leader and composer of the jazz/noise band Sudoku Killer, which released the albums Sudoku Killer (ZdM, 2010), Infanticide (Auand Records, 2015), "Asperger" (Clean Feed Records, 2018)

In 2010, she won the Jazzit Award for best Italian composer. The album Sudoku Killer won second best album and her band won fourth place. From 2010–2015, she was named best new talent for the other important Italian jazz prize, TOP JAZZ, by Musica Jazz magazine. In 2022 she is announced twelfth between 20 best ever italian bassists on Rockit magazine.

She has worked with Stefano Bollani, Gianluca Petrella, Roberto Gatto, Maurizio Giammarco, Mirko Guerrini, Israel Varela, and Luca Aquino. On summer 2023 she opened the Italian tour of Kim Gordon (Sonic Youth bassist).

She is the sister of photographer Michele Palazzi.

== Discography ==
=== As leader ===
- 2010 Sudoku Killer (Zone di Musica)
- 2015 Infanticide (Auand)
- 2018 Asperger (Clean Feed Records)
