= Mike McGinnis =

- Born: 1973 (age 51–52); Sanford, Maine, United states
- Genres: Jazz
- Occupations: Instrumentalist, composer
- Instruments: Saxophone, clarinet
- Labels: RKM Music
- Website: mikemcginnis.com

Mike McGinnis (born 1973) is an American saxophonist, clarinetist, and composer.

== Early life ==
Mike McGinnis was born in 1973 in Sanford, Maine where he grew up. McGinnis began saxophone lessons with Bill Street in 1987. He studied music at the University of Southern Maine and Eastman School of Music and has been studying traditional harmony and counterpoint with NYC teacher Paul Caputo since 2004.

== Career ==
McGinnis recorded his debut CD, Tangents, with his group Between Green (which included Shane Endsley and Jacob Sacks) for Ravi Coltrane's RKM Music label in 2000. As a co-leader he has recorded four albums with The Four Bags, one with DDYGG and one with OK|OK. He also appeared in director Ang Lee's Taking Woodstock as the flute player.
