= Yeah Yeah Records =

American record label

Yeah Yeah Records is a Brooklyn-based, NYC-centric record label specializing in avant garde jazz and improvised music.

Yeah Yeah Records was founded in 2002. Artists appearing on the label include Paul Motian, Mat Maneri, Jacob Sacks, Yoon Sun Choi, Eivind Opsvik, Dan Weiss, and others.
