= Jacob Sacks =

American jazz pianist and composer

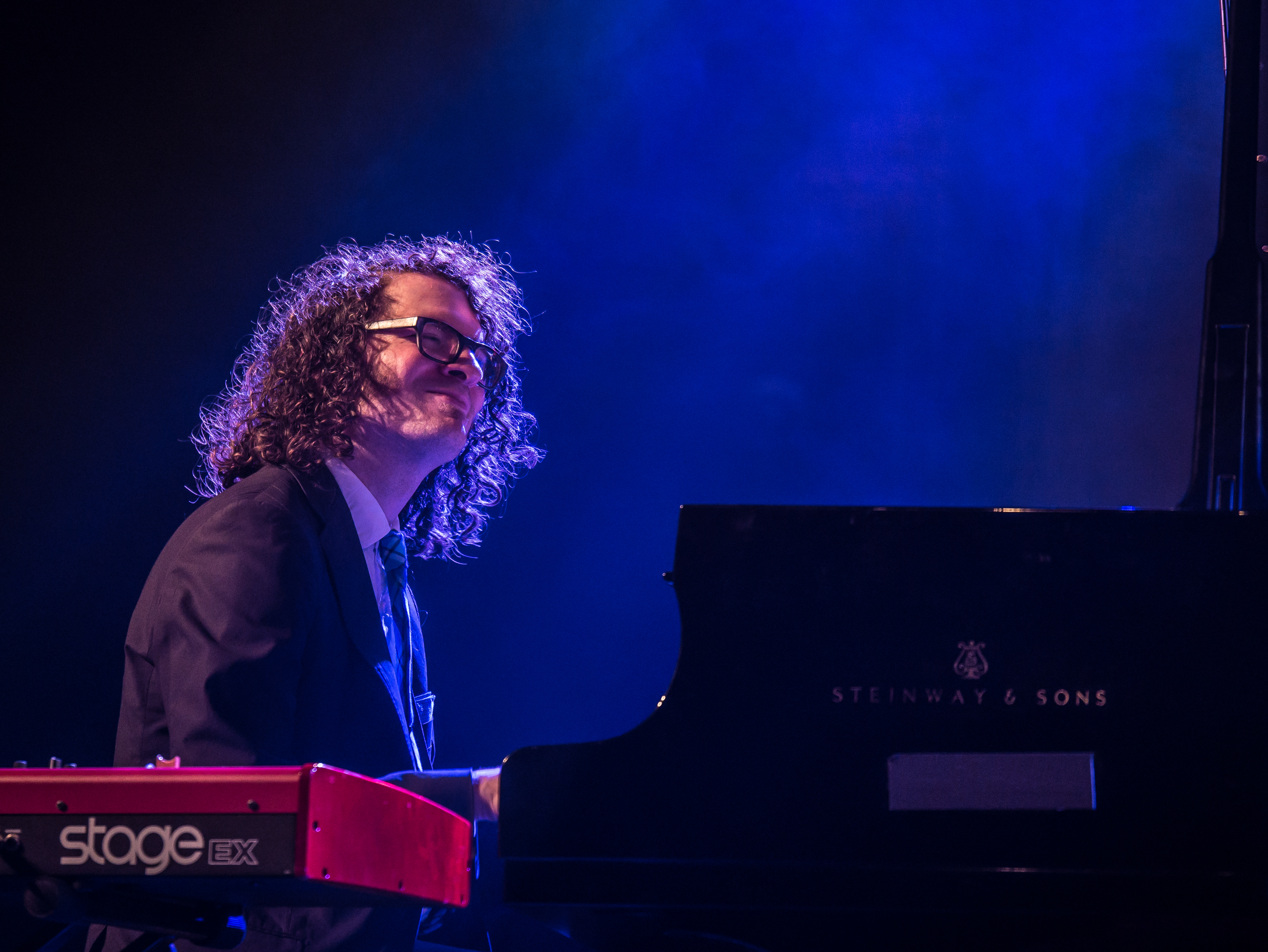
- At the Moers Festival 2015

Background information
- Origin: Michigan, U.S.
- Genres: Jazz
- Occupations: Musician, composer
- Instrument: Piano
- Years active: Late 1990s–present
- Website: jacobsacks.com

Jacob Sacks is an American jazz pianist and composer.

== Life and career ==
Sacks is originally from Michigan. He met drummer Dan Weiss at the Manhattan School of Music. Sacks was a finalist in the 1999 Thelonious Monk International Piano Competition, aged 22. Sacks was part of bassist Eivind Opsvik's quartet. Sacks has for a long time played in a trio with the bassist Thomas Morgan and drummer Dan Weiss, and in a duo with vocalist Yoon Sun Choi. Sacks has also played and recorded with harpsichord and other keyboard instruments.

== Playing style ==
Nate Chinen of The New York Times commented that Sacks is "drawn to the subtler, deeper mechanics of harmony and form."

== Compositions ==
Sacks "isn't averse to succinctness or simplicity as a composer".

== Discography ==
An asterisk (*) indicates that the year is that of release.

=== As leader/co-leader ===
Year recorded	Title	Label	Personnel/Notes
2005	Two Miles a Day	Loyal / Yeah Yeah	Quartet, with Mat Maneri (viola, violin), Eivind Opsvik (bass), Paul Motian (drums)
2008	Imagination: The Music of Joe Raposo	Yeah Yeah	Duo, co-led with Yoon Sun Choi (vocals)
2013*	No Man's Land	Yeah Yeah	Quintet, with Andrew Bishop (clarinet, tenor sax), John Wojciechowski (tenor sax), Tim Flood (bass), Dan Weiss (drums)

=== As sideman ===
Year recorded	Leader	Title	Label
2010*	David Binney	Aliso	Criss Cross Jazz
2010*	Dan Weiss	Timshel	Sunnyside
2010*	Jacám Manricks	Labyrinth	Manricks
2012*	Jon Irabagon	Unhinged	Irabbagast
2012*	Eivind Opsvik	Overseas IV	Loyal
2014*	Dan Weiss	Fourteen	Pi
2014*	Mike McGinnis	Road Trip	RKM
2017*	David Binney	The Time Verses	Criss Cross Jazz
2020*	Okkyung Lee	Yeo-Neun	Shelter Press
