= Haste (album) =

Live album by Veryan Weston, Ingrid Laubrock, Hanna Marshall
- Released: 2012
- Recorded: February 9, 2011
- Venues: Espai Cultural Caja Madrid, Barcelona
- Genre: Jazz
- Length: 56:11
- Label: Emanem

Veryan Weston chronology
5 More Dialogues (2011)	Haste (2012)	Dialogues in two Places (2012)

Ingrid Laubrock chronology
Catatumbo (2012)	Haste (2012)	Union (2012)

Haste is the debut album by the free improvisation trio consisting of British pianist Veryan Weston, German saxophonist Ingrid Laubrock and British cellist Hannah Marshall. It was recorded live in 2011 during the XV Festival Internacional de Improvisacion Hurta Cordel in Barcelona and released on the British Emanem label.

== Reception ==
Professional ratings
Review scores
Source	Rating
All About Jazz	4.5/5 stars
All About Jazz	3.5/5 stars
The Free Jazz Collective	4.5/5 stars

The All About Jazz review by Raul D'Gama Rose states, "Together, these three musicians have created an ingenious document where past and present collide revealing a glimpse what might be in a not-so-imaginary future."

The Point of Departure review by Stuart Broomer says, "It's work (for musician and listener alike) that consistently surprises, whether it's Laubrock's articulation (like a gentle machine gun), Weston's at once billowing and blistering keyboard passes, or Marshall's eerily evasive knitwork that simultaneously links and dissolves the myriad connections in the music. It's free improvisation of rare consonance."

Stef Gijssels of The Free Jazz Collective commented: "The overall effect is eery, presenting a sonic universe full of surprises and possibilities, of sensitive enthusiasm and hesitating joy, and at times of sad acceptance or paralysing terror... Beautiful, challenging and rewarding music."

== Track listing ==
All compositions by Weston, Laubrock, Marshall

1. "Sleping Down Hill" – 27:11
2. "Leaning Up" – 23:16
3. "Courtesy of None" – 5:44

== Personnel ==
- Veryan Weston – piano
- Ingrid Laubrock – soprano sax, tenor sax
- Hannah Marshall – cello
