= The Madness of Crowds (Ingrid Laubrock album) =

Studio album by Ingrid Laubrock
- Released: 2011
- Recorded: September 9, 2010
- Studio: Brooklyn Recording, New York City
- Genre: Jazz
- Length: 64:33
- Label: Intakt

Ingrid Laubrock chronology
Anti-House (2010)	The Madness of Crowds (2011)	Catatumbo (2012)

The Madness of Crowds is the second album by Sleepthief, a free improvisation trio led by German jazz saxophonist Ingrid Laubrock with British pianist Liam Noble and American drummer Tom Rainey. It was recorded in 2010 and released by Intakt Records. The song titles as well as the album's title are taken from the book Extraordinary Popular Delusions and the Madness of Crowds by Scottish writer Charles Mackay.

== Reception ==
Professional ratings
Review scores
Source	Rating
All About Jazz	5/5 stars
The Free Jazz Collective	4/5 stars
The Guardian	3/5 stars

The 5-star All About Jazz review by Nic Jones states "As of The Madness of Crowds, saxophonist Laubrock, pianist Liam Noble and drummer Tom Rainey are one of the most rewarding bands out there. They were before, but now the clarity and depth of interaction in their music is enough to deepen that assertion, and when a signature sound also comes as part of the deal then it's time for the loud applause."

In a review for The Guardian, John Fordham says "Laubrock's yelping lines over Rainey's battering percussion, her contrasting murmurings over damped piano strings and arrhythmic tappings, windy multiphonic sounds amid cowbell chimes and ghostly chords reveal an increasingly distinctive Sleepthief soundscape."

The Free Jazz Collective's Paul Acquaro called the music "pretty intriguing material," and noted that the "excellent group's interplay is intriguing and interesting."

== Track listing ==
All compositions by Laubrock, Noble, Rainey

1. "Extraordinary Popular Delusions" – 8:04
2. "You Never Know What's in the Next Room" – 10:31
3. "The Slow Poisoners" – 5:09
4. "There She Goes with Her Eye Out" – 5:06
5. "South Sea Bubble" – 4:49
6. "Haunted Houses" – 4:52
7. "Does Your Mother Know You're Out?" – 10:30
8. "Tulipmania" – 7:37
9. "Hindsight Is Always 20/20" – 7:55

== Personnel ==
- Ingrid Laubrock – saxophones
- Liam Noble – piano
- Tom Rainey – drums
