= Forensic (album) =

Studio album by Ingrid Laubrock
- Released: 2005
- Recorded: May 28, 2003
- Studio: Curtis Schwartz Studios, Ardingly
- Genre: Jazz
- Length: 66:37
- Label: F-IRE
- Producer: Ingrid Laubrock

Ingrid Laubrock chronology
Some Time (2001)	Forensic (2005)	Let's Call This... (2006)

Forensic is an album by German jazz saxophonist Ingrid Laubrock, which was recorded in 2003 and released on the British F-IRE label, a musician-run company associated to the F-IRE Collective.

== Reception ==
Professional ratings
Review scores
Source	Rating
All About Jazz	5/5 stars
The Guardian	3/5 stars
The Penguin Guide to Jazz Recordings	3/4 stars

The authors of The Penguin Guide to Jazz Recordings wrote: 'There's an ease and confidence about Forensic... a strong album with a rare coherence and sense of purpose."

The 5-star All About Jazz review by Chris May states "Mysterious, moody and close to the edge, Forensic plays like a new take on the noir tradition. It's astringent and shadowy, like you'd expect from noir, but it's also visceral, hot and exhilarating, like you probably wouldn't. A new noir for a new world disorder."

In a review for The Guardian, John Fordham says "Some of the music is spookily dark and sepulchral, some of it delicately eccentric, some spun as slowly and symmetrically as a web, and the cello of Ben Davis is a constant source of both fresh melody and subtle timbres."

Lara Bellini of the BBC commented: "Laubrock shows an inextinguishable curiosity, testing stylistic boundaries both as composer and interpreter. Her investigative (indeed, forensic) approach to jazz shapes the album from head to toe, dissecting it under a playful scalpel."

One Final Note's Jay Collins remarked: "Laubrock's abilities are on display in the company of a stellar quintet... Perhaps the key here, other than the individual contributions, is Laubrock's compositional restlessness, which proves compelling whether negotiating film noir landscapes, heartfelt introspection, or pulsing improvs... with each journey, Laubrock's finely-crafted, wide-ranging program ends up pulling at your shirtsleeves."

== Track listing ==
All compositions by Ingrid Laubrock except 5, 8 & 10 which are free improvisations

1. "Forensic Experts" – 4:00
2. "Stone Lions" – 7:20
3. "Monologue Man Pt I" – 2:01
4. "Monologue Man Pt II" – 8:38
5. "Us" – 4:49
6. "Forensic" – 8:16
7. "Clara" – 5:14
8. "Stringding" – 6:06
9. "Mirrors" – 7:45
10. "BLT" – 12:28

== Personnel ==
- Ingrid Laubrock – soprano sax, alto sax, tenor sax, baritone sax, vocal on 10
- Karim Merchant – piano
- Ben Davis – cello
- Larry Bartley – double bass
- Tom Skinner – drums, bells
- Julian Siegel – bass clarinet on 4
