= Sleepthief (Ingrid Laubrock album) =

Studio album by Ingrid Laubrock
- Released: 2008
- Recorded: September 1, 2007
- Studio: Radley College
- Genre: Jazz
- Length: 63:38
- Label: Intakt

Ingrid Laubrock chronology
Let's Call This... (2006)	Sleepthief (2008)	Paradoxical Frog (2010)

Sleepthief is the eponymous debut album by German jazz saxophonist Ingrid Laubrock's free improvisation trio with British pianist Liam Noble and American drummer Tom Rainey. It was recorded in 2007 and released on the Swiss Intakt label. Laubrock and Noble played together since 2005 and recorded the duo Let's Call This.... While Rainey was visiting the UK they decided to get together and Sleepthief was born.

== Reception ==
Professional ratings
Review scores
Source	Rating
All About Jazz	5/5 stars
All About Jazz	4/5 stars
The Free Jazz Collective	4.5/5 stars
The Guardian	3/5 stars

The 5-star All About Jazz review by Chris May states, "In British pianist Liam Noble and American drummer Tom Rainey, Laubrock has found the perfect partners—restlessly inventive, provocative, deep, infinitely nuanced, spontaneously architectural." AAJ's Nic Jones commented: "this is heavy creativity indeed... it's also a declaration of the abiding value of collective, spontaneous music making."

In a review for The Guardian, John Fordham notes that, "The music is free-jazz, but full of contrasts. Some of it finds the Monkish Noble banging chords while Rainey plays scattered patterns at half his speed, some has Laubrock's gruff, Evan Parkerish trills and whirrs drifting up and down over piano-string twangs and arrhythmic clatters."

The Free Jazz Collective's Stef Gijssels noted the music's "seeming paradox[es]": "intimacy and expansiveness... warmth and creativity, tradition and avant-garde," and described the album as "highly recommendable."

Writing for Point of Departure, Brian Morton called the album "clever, emotionally nuanced and sheerly enjoyable," describing Laubrock's tone as "something very individual and original."

== Track listing ==
All compositions by Laubrock, Noble, Rainey

1. "Zugunruhe" – 8:19
2. "Sleepthief" – 10:30
3. "Oofy Twerp" – 5:54
4. "Never Were Not" – 9:55
5. "Environmental Stud" – 7:04
6. "The Ears Have It" – 8:33
7. "Batchelor's Know-how" – 5:39
8. "Social Cheats" – 4:39
9. "Amelie" – 3:05

== Personnel ==
- Ingrid Laubrock – saxophones, piano on 9
- Liam Noble – piano
- Tom Rainey – drums
