= Eivind Opsvik =

Norwegian jazz musician and composer

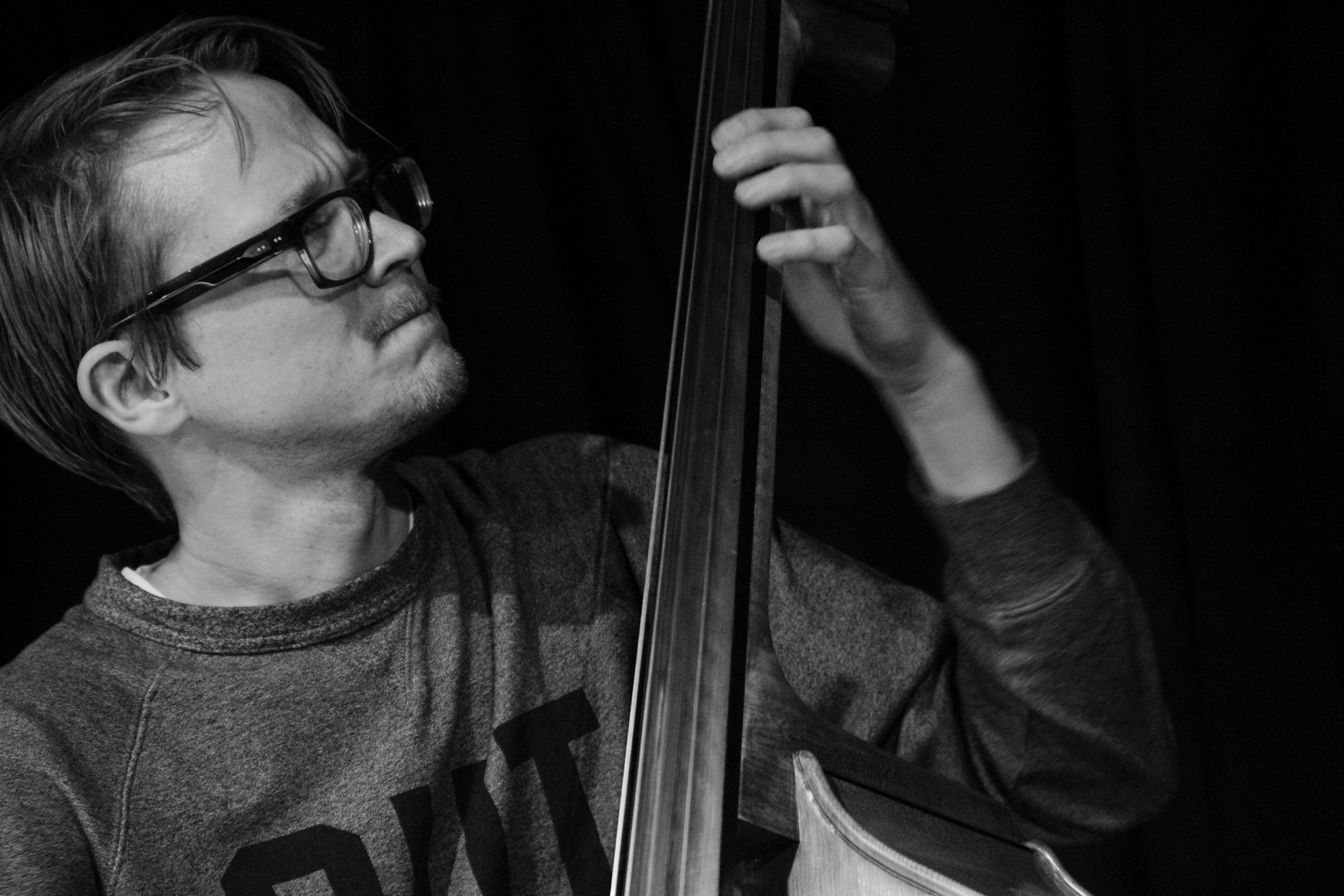
- Opsvik with the Nate Wooley Quintet in concert at Club W71, Weikersheim March 15, 2014.

Background information
- Born: 1973 (age 52–53); Oslo
- Origin: Norway
- Genres: Jazz
- Occupations: Musician, composer
- Instruments: Upright bass, lap steel guitar, keyboards, drums
- Label: Loyal Label
- Website: eivindopsvik.com

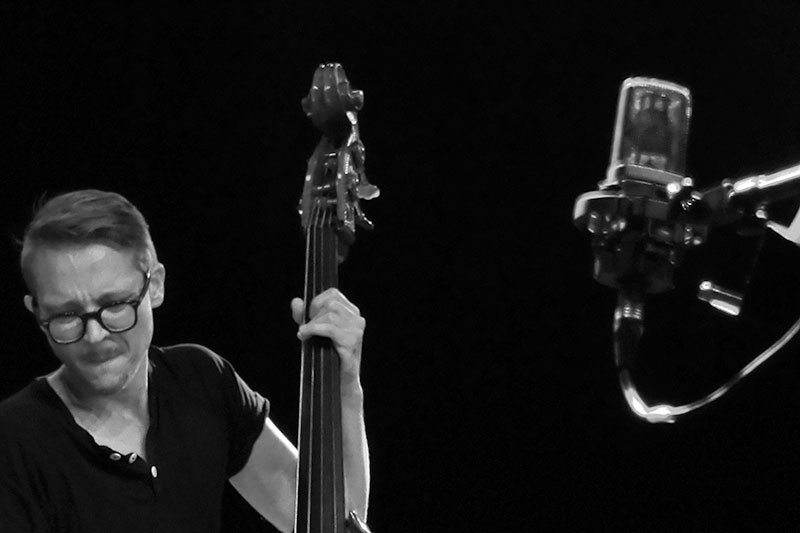
Eivind Opsvik performing with Nate Wooley Quintet at Aarhus Jazzfestival, Denmark 2016

Eivind Opsvik (born 1973 in Oslo, Norway) is a Norwegian jazz musician (upright bass) and composer, the son of the Norwegian interior and furniture designer Peter Opsvik.

== Career ==
Opsvik is a graduate of the Norwegian Academy of Music (1993–97). He made himself evident on the Oslo jazz scene from the early 1990s, before moving to New York in 1998, where he has been living since. He is thoroughly involved in composing, recording, mixing and producing music, as he manages a studio (Greenwood Underground) and record label (Loyal Label) in his basement. His main projects are 'Overseas' and 'Opsvik & Jennings', besides his solo project.

'Overseas' is the name of his band that was formed in 2002 and includes Jacob Sacks (piano, harpsichord and organ), Tony Malaby (saxophone), Kenny Wollesen (drums) and the most recent addition, Brandon Seabrook (guitar). Opsvik plays upright bass and writes all the music. Four records have been released, starting with Overseas (2003), then Overseas II (2005) and third Overseas III (2008). Overseas IV was recorded in the summer of 2011 and released in 2012.

Opsvik & Jennings is an experimental pop duo with tunesmith and guitarist Aaron Jennings, that have released three albums, Fløyel Files (2005), Commuter Anthems (2007) and A Dream I Used to Remember (2009).

Opsvik is currently working on a solo album (2013) in collaboration with photographer Michelle Arcila. He also performs with a plethora of other bands and musicians, like Tony Malaby's Paloma Recio, Nate Wooley Quintet, Jesse Stacken Trio, Skuli Sverrison's Seria, Two Miles A Day with a record featuring Jacob Sacks, Mat Maneri and Paul Motian, Jeff Davis Trio with Russ Lossing, Mary Halvorson's Reverse Blue, Rocket Engine, Plainville, Kris Davis Trio, Håkon Kornstad, David Binney with Brian Blade and Craig Taborn, Rocket Engine, Tone Collector, Jesse Harris' Cosmo, The Interaction of Non-Interaction with Ben Gerstein and Poor Pluto.

== Discography ==
=== Solo albums ===
Within 'Overseas' including Jacob Sacks & Tony Malaby

- 2003: Overseas (Fresh Sound New Talent), feat. Craig Taborn, Wells Hanley, Gerald Cleaver, Jeff Davis, Dan Weiss, Loren Stillman & Jason Rigby
- 2005: Overseas II (Fresh Sound New Talent), feat. Kenny Wollesen, Jeff Davis, Craig Taborn, Loren Stillman
- 2008: Overseas III (Loyal Label), feat. Kenny Wollesen, Larry Campbell & Jeff Davis
- 2012: Overseas IV (Loyal Label), feat. Kenny Wollesen & Brandon Seabrook
- 2017: Overseas V (Loyal Label), feat. Kenny Wollesen & Brandon Seabrook

=== Collaborations ===
Within 'Tone Collector' including Tony Malaby & Jeff Davis

- 2005: Tone Collector (Jazzaway Records)

Within 'Opsvik & Jennings' (Aaron Jennings)

- 2005: Fløyel Files (NCM East)
- 2007: Commuter Anthems (Rune Grammofon)
- 2009: A Dream I Used to Remember (Loyal Label)

Within Marvin Charles Trio including Ketil Gutvik

- 2006: Marvin Charles Trio (Hot Club Records)

Within 'Jacob Sacks/Eivind Opsvik/Mat Maneri/Paul Motian'

- 2007: Two Miles A Day (Loyal Label/Yeah Yeah Records)

Within Jostein Gulbrandsen Quartet

- 2007: Twelve (Fresh Sound New Talent)

Within 'Rocket Engine' including Eric Biondo, Mike Pride, Jonathan Goldberger, Aaron Jennings, Ben Gerstein, Jeff Davis & Kris Davis

- 2007: What is This That Stands Before Me? (Loyal Label)

Within 'Jon Irabagon's Outright!'

- 2008: Outright! (Innova Recordings)

Within 'Nate Wooley Quintet' including Harris Eisenstadt, Josh Sinton & Matt Moran

- 2011: (Put Your) Hands Together (Clean Feed Records)
- 2015: (Dance to) The Early Music (Clean Feed Records)

Within 'Nate Wooley Sextet' including Josh Sinton, Harris Eisenstadt, Dan Peck & Matt Moran

- 2013: (Sit In) The Throne of Friendship (Clean Feed Records)

With David Binney

- 2013: Lifted Land (Criss Cross/Musikklosen), Craig Taborn & Tyshawn Sorey

With Mary Halvorson

- 2014: "Reverse Blue" (Relative Pitch Records)

With David Binney

- 2017: "The Times Verses" (Criss Cross)

With Samo Salamon

- 2025: "Dream Suites Vol. 1" (Samo Records)
