= Michele Palazzi =

Italian photographer (born 1984)

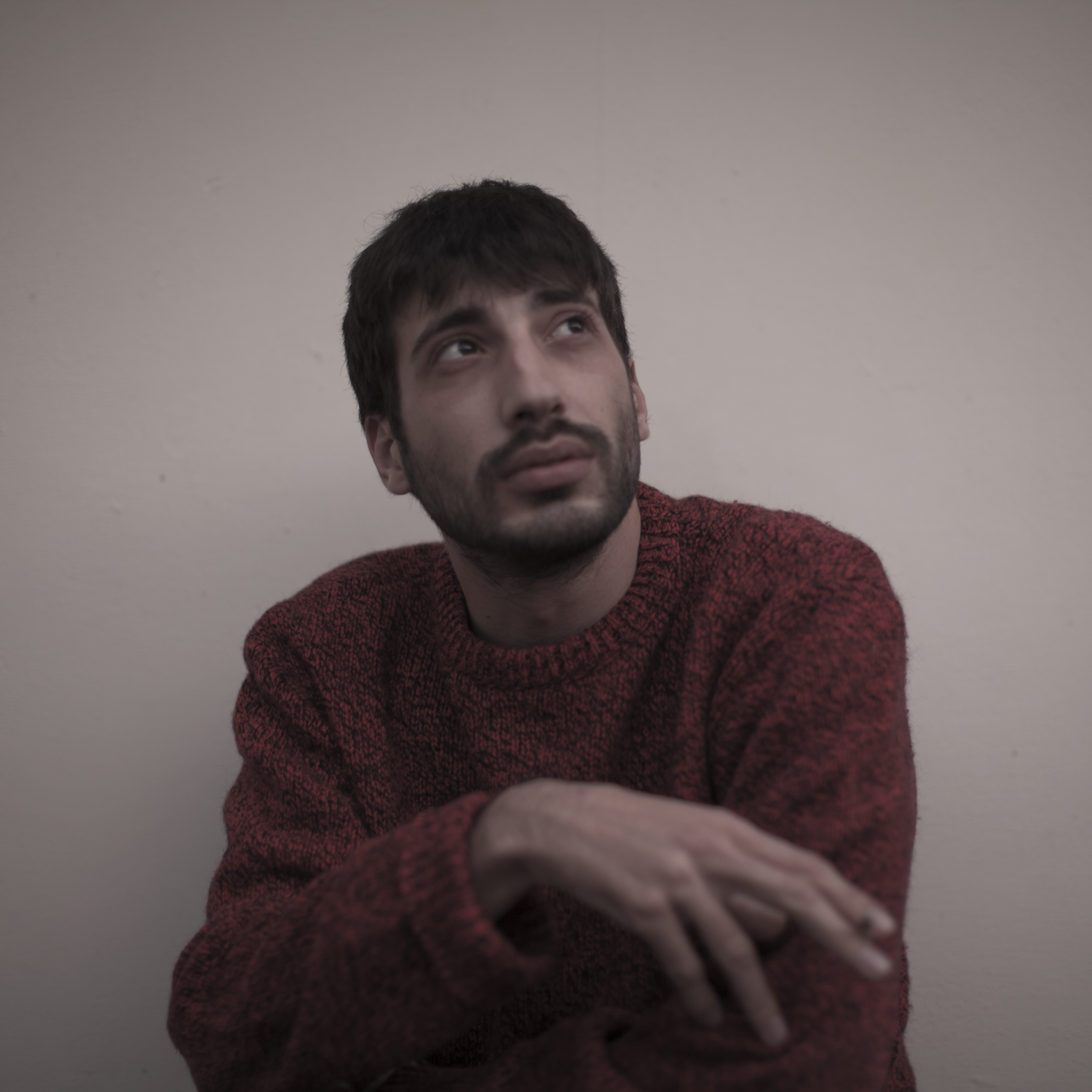
- Born: November 27 1984; Rome, Italy
- Known for: Photography
- Awards: World Press Photo Award for Daily Life, first prize stories
- Website: michelepalazziphotographer.com

Michele Palazzi (born 27 November 1984) is an Italian photographer and World Press Photo prize winner.

== Biography ==
Palazzi is an Italian photographer born in Rome. In 2007 he gained a three-year master's degree in Photography at the Scuola Romana di Fotografia. In 2013 he received the First Prize of Environmental Photographer of the Year Award by the Chartered Institution of Water and Environmental Management. Between 2012 and 2013 he started working on Black Gold Hotel a long term project about the modernization impact in Mongolia, which has been awarded with the First Prize in the Daily Life category - Stories of the World Press Photo 2015. In 2019 Palazzi published his first book, Finisterrae: terra di confine and in 2021 published the second one, Mongolia Felix with a text written by Giovanni Lindo Ferretti.

He lives in Rome and he is represented by the Contrasto agency. He's currently working as a photography teacher at the Rome University of Fine Arts.

== Publications ==
- Finisterrae: terra di confine. Livorno: Origini Edizioni, 2019. ISBN 9788831429009.
- Mongolia Felix Livorno: Origini Edizioni, 2021. ISBN 9788831429023.

== Collections ==
Palazzi's work is held in the following public collections:

- Bibliothèque nationale de France, Paris, FR: 1 print (as of January 2020)

== Prizes and awards ==
- 2011 Center Awards “Migrant Workers Journey” 1st Prize Project Launch Award
- 2013 Environmental Photographer of the Year “Gone with the Dust #02” 1st Prize Environmental Photographer of the Year Award
- 2015 World Press Photo “Black Gold Hotel” 1st Prize Daily Life, Stories
