= Clean Feed Records =

Portuguese record label

- Founded: 2001; 25 years ago
- Founder: Pedro Costa
- Genre: Jazz
- Country of origin: Portugal
- Location: Lisbon
- Official website: www.cleanfeed-records.com

Clean Feed Records is a jazz record label founded in Lisbon, Portugal, in 2001.

The label's roster includes Ray Anderson, Tim Berne, Carlos Bica, Anthony Braxton, Mark Dresser, Ellery Eskelin, Peter Evans, Scott Fields, Fight the Big Bull, Charles Gayle, Dennis González, Mary Halvorson, Alfred Harth, Tony Malaby, Joe Morris, Caterina Palazzi, Evan Parker, Elliott Sharp, Ken Vandermark, and Otomo Yoshihide.

Since 2006, the company has presented the annual Clean Feed Festival in New York City, featuring performances by Clean Feed recording artists. Starting in 2010, it expanded its festivals to include Chicago and cities in Europe.

All About Jazz in 2009 rated it one of the five best jazz labels in the world for the last two years running.

== See also ==
- List of record labels
