= Brad Jones (bassist) =

American jazz bassist (born 1963)

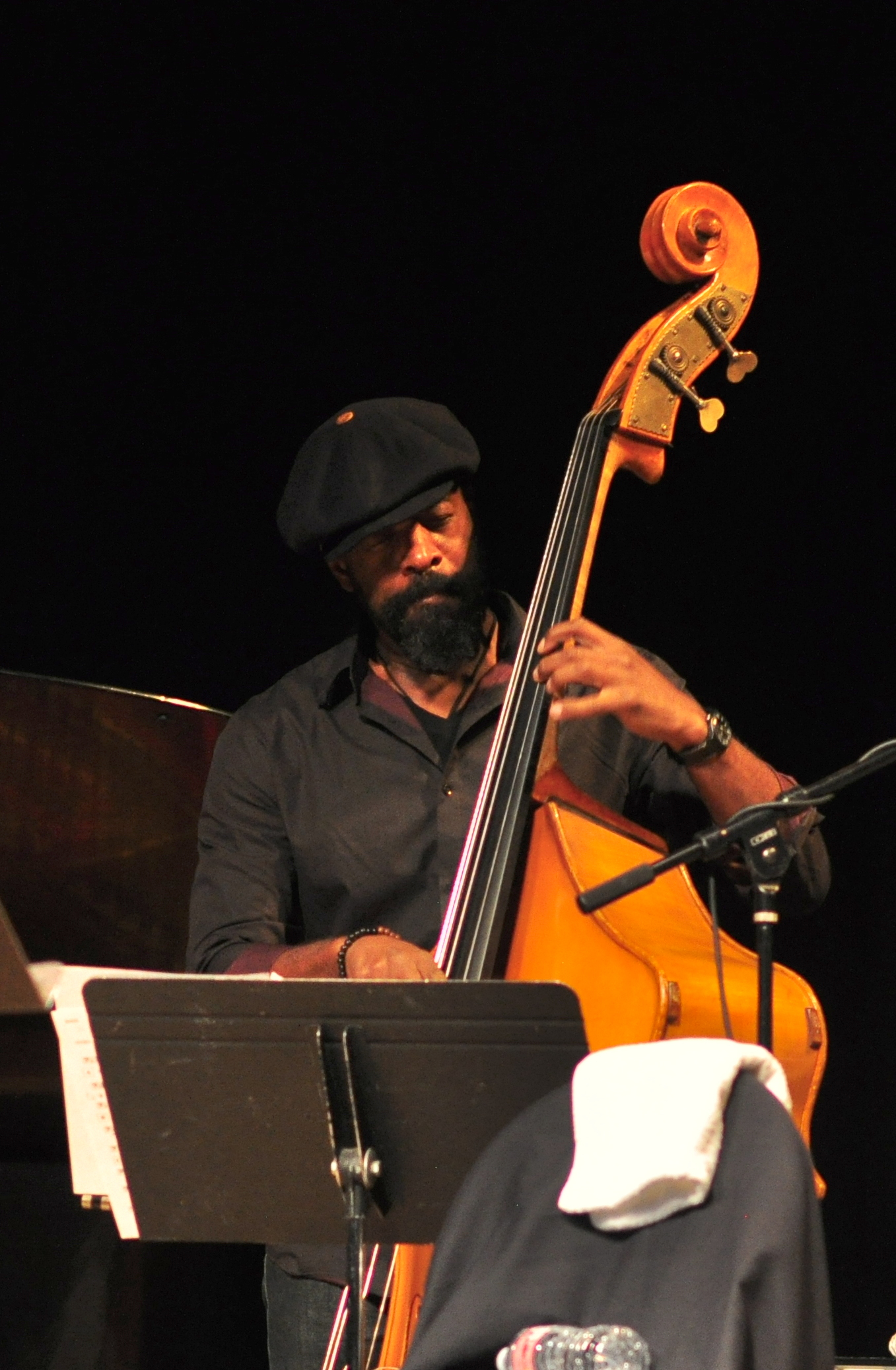

Background information
- Birth name: Bradley Christopher Jones
- Born: May 20, 1963 (age 62); New York City, U.S.
- Genres: Jazz
- Occupations: Musician; educator
- Instruments: Double bass; electric bass
- Years active: 1987–present
- Labels: Knitting Factory; Ropeadope

Bradley Christopher Jones (born May 20, 1963, in New York City) is an American jazz bassist who performs on both bass guitar and double-bass.

Jones started on drums as a child and first began playing bass guitar at age 12. At age 18 he added double bass, studying under Lisle Atkinson, and he took a bachelor's degree in music education at Jersey City State College in 1986. In the late 1980s he worked regularly with Dave Tronzo and Jim Nolet, and played in the Jazz Passengers and in groups led by Marc Ribot.

In the 1990s he worked with Muhal Richard Abrams, Elvin Jones, Ornette Coleman, Carlos Garnett, Mark Taylor, Kazutoki Umezu, Misha Mengelberg, and Han Bennink.

He has led the groups AKA Alias featuring Curtis Fowlkes and David Gilmore, the Brad Jones Quartet with Greg Tardy and more recently Avant Lounge with Bruce Williams, Barney McAll, Bill Ware and Nate Smith.

== Discography ==
- Uncivilized Poise (Knitting Factory Works, 1999) with AKA Alias
- Pouring My Heart In (Brad Jones Quartet, 2003) with the Brad Jones Quartet
- The Embodiment (Senoj, 2009) with AKA Alias
- Avant Lounge (Ropeadope, 2012) with Avant Lounge

=== As sideman ===
With Muhal Richard Abrams

- Blu Blu Blu (Black Saint, 1991)
- Family Talk (Black Saint, 1993)
- Think All, Focus One (Black Saint, 1995)
- Song for All (Black Saint, 1995 [1997])

with Ray Anderson and Marty Ehrlich

- Hear You Say (Intuition, 2010)

With Noël Akchoté

- Toi-Même (Winter & Winter, 2008)

With Lucian Ban

- Playground (Jazzaway, 2006)

With Don Byron

- Do the Boomerang: The Music of Junior Walker (Blue Note, 2006)
- Love, Peace, and Soul (Savoy, 2011)

With George Cartwright

- Dot (Cuneiform, 1994)

With Ornette Coleman

- Tone Dialing (Harmolodic, 1995)

With Elvis Costello

- North (Deutsche Grammophon, 2003)

With Dave Douglas

- Freak In (RCA Bluebird, 2003)
- Keystone (Greenleaf, 2005)
- Moonshine (Greenleaf, 2007)
- Spark of Being (Greenleaf, 2010)

With Francis Dunnery

- Tall Blonde Helicopter (Atlantic, 1995)

With Carlos Garnett

- Resurgence (Muse, 1996)
- Fuego en Mi Alma (HighNote, 1997)
- Under Nubian Skies (HighNote, 1999)

With The Jazz Passengers

- Broken Night Red Light (Les Disques du Crépuscule, 1987)
- Deranged & Decomposed (Les Disques du Crépuscule, 1988)
- Implement Yourself (New World, 1990)
- Live at the Knitting Factory (Knitting Factory, 1990)
- Plain Old Joe (Knitting Factory Works, 1993)
- In Love (High Street, 1994)
- Individually Twisted (32 Jazz, 1996)
- "Live" in Spain (32 Jazz, 1998)
- Reunited (Justin Time, 2010)
- Still Life with Trouble (Enja, 2017)

With Elvin Jones

- Going Home (Enja, 1992)

With Sean Lennon

- Into the Sun (Grand Royal, 1998)

With Dave Liebman

- Surreality (Enja, 2012)

With David Mead

- Indiana (Nettwerk, 2004)

With Misha Mengelberg

- Who's Bridge (Avant, 1994)
- Four in One (Songlines, 2001)

With Allison Moorer

- Down to Believing (eOne, 2016)

With Max Nagl

- Big Four (HatOLOGY, 2002) with Steven Bernstein and Noël Akchoté
- Flamingos (HatOLOGY, 2004) with Otto Lechner
- Big Four Live (HatOLOGY, 2007) with Steven Bernstein and Noël Akchoté
- Big Four/Sortilèges (Extraplatte, 2010) with Steven Bernstein and Noël Akchoté

With Roy Nathanson

- Camp Stories: Music from the Motion Picture (Knitting Factory Works, 1996)
- Fire at Keaton's Bar and Grill (Six Degrees, 2000)
- Subway Moon (Yellowbird, 2009)

With Jim Nolet

- With You (Knitting Factory Works, 1993)

With Bobby Previte

- Set the Alarm for Monday (Palmetto, 2008)

With Chuck Prophet

- Bobby Fuller Died for Your Sins (Yep Roc, 2017)

With Marc Ribot

- Requiem for What's His Name (Les Disques du Crépuscule, 1992)
- Shoe String Symphonettes (Tzadik, 1997)
- The Prosthetic Cubans (Atlantic, 1998)
- ¡Muy Divertido! (Atlantic, 2000)

With Roswell Rudd

- Keep Your Heart Right (Sunnyside, 2008)

With Jamie Saft

- Chaliwa (Veal, 2013) as New Zion Trio
- Sunshine Seas (RareNoise, 2016) as New Zion with Cyro Baptista
- Blue Dream (RareNoise, 2018)
- Hidden Corners (RareNoise, 2019)

With Elliott Sharp

- Aggregat (Clean Feed, 2012)
- Quintet (Clean Feed, 2013)
- Dialectrical (Clean Feed, 2016)

With Vibes: Bill Ware and E.J. Rodriguez

- Vibes (Knitting Factory, 1998)
- With Drawn (Knitting Factory, 1999)
- Liebe Tunina (Knitting Factory, 2000)
- Vibes 4 (Knitting Factory, 2001)

With Bill Ware

- Long and Skinny (Knitting Factory Works, 1993)
- Played Right (Cheetah, 2009)

With John Zorn

- John Zorn's Cobra: Live at the Knitting Factory (Knitting Factory Works, 1995)
- Voices in the Wilderness (Tzadik, 2003)
