= Moonshine (Dave Douglas album) =

Live album by Dave Douglas & Keystone
- Released: 2007
- Recorded: May 4, 2007
- Genre: Jazz
- Length: 56:31
- Label: Greenleaf Music
- Producer: Dave Douglas

Dave Douglas chronology
Live at the Jazz Standard (2007)	Moonshine (2007)	Spirit Moves (2009)

Moonshine is the 28th album by trumpeter Dave Douglas. It was released on the Greenleaf label in 2007 and features a live performance recorded in a studio in front of an audience by Douglas, Adam Benjamin, DJ Olive, Gene Lake, Marcus Strickland, and Brad Jones.

== Reception ==
Professional ratings
Review scores
Source	Rating
Allmusic	4/5 stars
All About Jazz	5/5 stars

The Allmusic review by Thom Jurek awarded the album 4 stars, stating: "This is not 'jazz' in the conventional (read: conservative) sense, but without the jazz heritage, this creative tour de force of 21st century jazz-funk wouldn't -- and probably couldn't -- exist. Moonshine is a(nother) monster outing by Douglas". On All About Jazz John Kelman said "What makes Moonshine ultimately such a success, however, is Douglas' ability to cloak avant-garde concerns in accessible surroundings. As deep and challenging as anything he's ever recorded, Moonshine remains an album that's as much food for the heart and soul as it is for the mind, and continues Douglas' remarkably unbroken string of superb and uncompromising releases". In JazzTimes, Bill Milkowski wrote "Inspired by the unfinished 1917 Buster Keaton/Fatty Arbuckle comedy film Moon-shine, this collection of cutting edge, groove-oriented tunes by Douglas’s electrified, genre-bending Keystone band picks up where 2005’s Keystone left off".

== Track listing ==
All compositions by Dave Douglas

1. "Dog Star" - 5:01
2. "Moonshine" - 7:30
3. "Married Life" - 9:43
4. "Silent Stars" - 8:39
5. "Scopes" - 2:39
6. "Flood Plane" - 7:42
7. "Kitten" - 4:23
8. "Tough" - 10:54

== Personnel ==
- Dave Douglas: trumpet
- Adam Benjamin: Fender Rhodes piano
- DJ Olive: turntables
- Marcus Strickland: saxophone
- Brad Jones: bass
- Gene Lake: drums
