= United Front: Brass Ecstasy at Newport =

Live album by Dave Douglas
- Released: 2011
- Recorded: August 8th, 2010 at the CareFusion Newport Jazz Festival, RI
- Genre: Jazz
- Length: 45:01
- Label: Greenleaf GRE-1018

Dave Douglas chronology
Spark of Being (2010)	United Front: Brass Ecstasy at Newport (2011)	Three Views (2011)

United Front: Brass Ecstasy at Newport is a live album by trumpeter Dave Douglas' Brass Ecstasy released on the Greenleaf Music label in 2011.

== Reception ==
Professional ratings
Review scores
Source	Rating
All About Jazz	4/5 stars

In JazzTimes, Brian Zimmerman wrote "The songs on this album are imbued with the kind of energy that only a live performance can create. Listen closely and you’ll hear the audience shout and scream their approval. And believe me – after hearing this album, you’ll probably do the same". On All About Jazz Mark Corroto said "This unique lineup matches the marching sounds of trumpet, tuba, and trombone with of Nasheet Waits' full drum kit, while Vincent Chancey's French horn balances the outside parade with the inside chamber, and does so nicely. Waits is more than a timekeeper, he's the turbo engine, with Chancey providing the polishing agent to the sound".

== Track listing ==
All compositions by Dave Douglas except as indicated

1. "Spirit Moves" - 5:03
2. "Rava" - 10:05
3. "Fats" - 3:36
4. "I'm So Lonesome I Could Cry" (Hank Williams) - 7:31
5. "United Front" - 6:18
6. "Bowie" - 12:28

== Personnel ==
- Dave Douglas: trumpet
- Vincent Chancey: French horn
- Luis Bonilla: trombone
- Marcus Rojas: tuba
- Nasheet Waits: drums
