= Linda May Han Oh =

Australian jazz bassist and composer (born 1984)

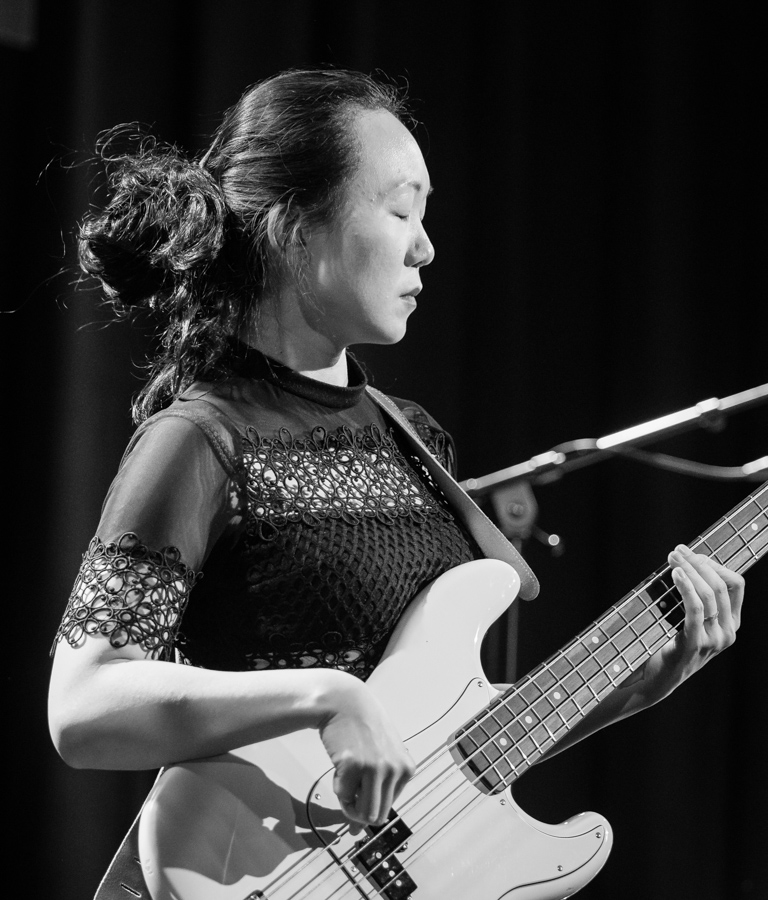
- Linda Oh performing in Oslo in 2019

Background information
- Born: Linda May Han Oh; 25 August 1984 (age 42); Petaling Jaya, Selangor, Malaysia
- Origin: Perth, Western Australia, Australia
- Genre: Jazz
- Occupation: Musician
- Instrument: Bass
- Label: Biophilia
- Website: lindamayhanoh.com

Linda May Han Oh (born 25 August 1984) is an Australian jazz bassist and composer. She is currently Associate Professor at the Berklee College of Music and is also part of the Institute for Jazz and Gender Justice.

== Biography ==
Born in Petaling Jaya, Malaysia, to parents of Chinese heritage, Oh was raised in Perth, Western Australia. When she was 11, she started to play the clarinet and at the age of 13 bassoon. She went to Churchlands Senior High School. As a bass guitarist, she started in a high school band; and in 2002, she attended the Western Australian Academy of Performing Arts, where she picked up the upright bass and studied solo transcriptions of Dave Holland. Her thesis was on the classical Indian music rhythms in Holland's solos. After more scholarships she moved to New York in 2008, where she completed her master's degree at the Manhattan School of Music, among others with Jay Anderson, John Riley, Phil Markowitz, Dave Liebman and Rodney Jones as supervisors.

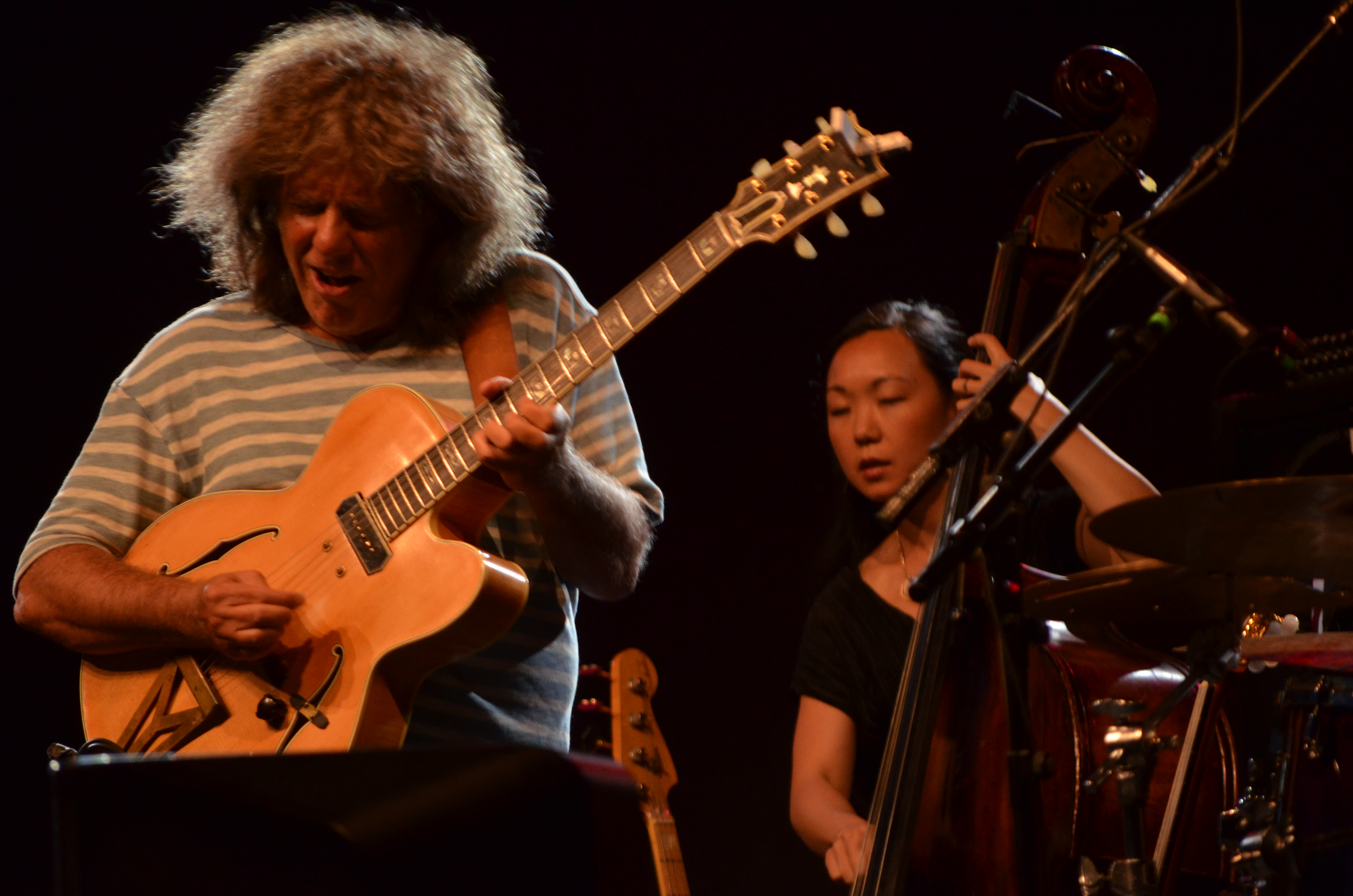
On upright bass with Pat Metheny (2018)

In 2008, she released her debut album Entry with own compositions and a cover version of Red Hot Chili Peppers Soul to Squeeze, with the trumpeter Ambrose Akinmusire and drummer Obed Calvaire. Oh also contributed to albums with the alto saxophonist Jon Irabagon (Outright, 2008), Sarah Bemanning (Løvetann Klokke, 2010), Brian Girley (Tro, 2011) and Art Hirahara (Hygget & Meditasjoner, 2014). In 2012, the album Initial Here with pianist Fabian Almazan was released, followed by Sun Pictures (Greenleaf), among others with Ted Poor. In addition, she has performed with Slide Hampton, T. S. Monk, Nathan Davis, George Kabler, James Morrison, Nasheet Venter, Joel Frahm, Pat Metheny, Steve Wilson and Billy Childs. She married Cuban American pianist Fabian Almazan in 2018. As of 2024, Han Oh was living in Boston and working as a professor at Berklee College of Music.

== Awards and honors ==
- 2004: Winner of the competition IAJE Sisters in Jazz
- First prize for best presentation at her exam.
- 2006-2008 she was a scholarship holder of the program Betty Carter's Jazz Ahead, Banff center, program for creative improvisation, and Steans Institut.
- 2008: Participant of ASCAP Young Jazz Composer’s Award
- 2009: Semifinalist of the Thelonious Monk International Jazz Bass Competition.
- 2010: Winner of the Bell-Prize for young Australian jazz musicians of the year.
- 2018-2021: Named Bassist of the Year from the JJA Jazz Awards.
- 2020: Winner of the Art Music Award for Work of the Year: Jazz for Aventurine.
- 2022: Winner of the Deutscher Jazzpreis String instruments (International) award.
- 2023: Winner of the Herb Alpert Award for Music.
- 2023: Winner of the 'Best jazz instrumental album' at the Grammys alongside Terri Lyne Carrington, Kris Davis, Nicholas Payton & Matthew Stevens for New Standards Vol. 1
- 2023-2025: Named Bassist of the Year from the JJA Jazz Awards.

== Discography ==
=== As leader ===
- Entry (Self-released, 2009)
- Initial Here (Greenleaf Music, 2012)
- Sun Pictures (Greenleaf Music, 2013)
- Walk Against Wind (Biophilia, 2017)
- Aventurine (Biophilia, 2019)
- The Glass Hours (Biophilia, 2023)
- Strange Heavens (Biophilia, 2025)

=== As guest ===
With Dave Douglas

- GPS Vol 2: Orange Afternoons (Greenleaf Music, 2011)
- Be Still (Greenleaf Music, 2012)
- Pathways (Greenleaf Music, 2013)
- Time Travel (Greenleaf Music, 2013)
- Brazen Heart (Greenleaf Music, 2015)
- Serial Sessions 2015 (Greenleaf Music, 2016)
- Brazen Heart: Live at Jazz Standard (Greenleaf Music, 2018)
- Songs Of Ascent: Book 1 - Degrees (Greenleaf Music, 2022)

With Art Hirahara

- Libations & Meditations (Posi-Tone, 2015)
- Central Line (Posi-Tone, 2017)
- Sunward Bound (Posi-Tone, 2018)

With Jim Snidero

- Stream of Consciousness (Savant, 2013)
- Main Street (Savant, 2015)
- Project-K (Savant, 2020)

With others

- Thomas Barber, Snow Road (D Clef, 2009)
- Fabian Almazan, Personalities (Biophilia, 2011)
- Dan Cavanagh and Joe McCarthy, The Heart of the Geyser (OA2 Records, 2012)
- Quentin Angus, Perception (Aurora Sounds, 2013)
- Angela Davis, The Art of the Melody (Nicholas, 2013)
- George Colligan, Ask Me Tomorrow (SteepleChase, 2014)
- Tineke Postma, Sonic Halo (Challenge, 2014)
- Kavita Shah, Visions (Naive, 2014)
- Michael Dease, Relentless (Posi-Tone, 2014)
- David Berkman, Old Friends and New Friends (Palmetto, 2015)
- Terri Lyne Carrington, The Mosaic Project: Love and Soul (Concord, 2015)
- Joe Lovano and Dave Douglas, Sound Prints (Blue Note, 2015)
- Anthony Branker, Beauty Within (Origin, 2016)
- George Colligan, More Powerful (Whirlwind, 2017)
- Joe Lovano and Dave Douglas, Scandal (Greenleaf Music, 2018)
- Florian Weber, Lucent Waters (ECM, 2018)
- Fabian Almazan, This Land Abounds with Life (Biophilia, 2019)
- Pat Metheny, From This Place (Nonesuch, 2020)
- Vijay Iyer and Tyshawn Sorey, Uneasy (ECM, 2021)
- Victor Wooten and Steve Bailey, S'Low Down (Vix, 2022)
- Vijay Iyer and Tyshawn Sorey, Compassion (ECM, 2024)
- Nils Wülker, Zuversicht (Warner Music, 2026)
