= Live at Koncepts =

Live album by Henry Threadgill
- Released: 1991
- Recorded: May 4, 1991
- Genre: Jazz
- Label: Taylor Made
- Producer: David Stone

Henry Threadgill chronology
Spirit of Nuff...Nuff (1990)	Live at Koncepts (1991)	Too Much Sugar for a Dime (1993)

Live at Koncepts is a live album by Henry Threadgill recorded at the Koncepts Cultural Gallery in Oakland, California. The album features seven of Threadgill's compositions performed by Threadgill's Very Very Circus with Mark Taylor, Brandon Ross, Masujaa Edwin Rodriguez, Marcus Rojas, and Larry Bright.

== Reception ==
The Allmusic review by Brian Olewnick awarded the album 3 stars, stating, "Live at Koncepts isn't at quite the level of the best of this band's studio efforts (Spirit of Nuff...Nuff may take the prize there), but is quite enjoyable on its own. Any Threadgill fan will want to hear it".

Professional ratings
Review scores
Source	Rating
Allmusic	3/5 stars

== Track listing ==
All compositions by Henry Threadgill

1. "Next" - 9:04
2. "Snakes Don't Do Suicide" - 7:39
3. "I Love You with an Asterisk" - 5:40
4. "Someplace" - 7:30
5. "Dangerously Slippy" - 6:51
6. "King Kong" - 6:09
7. "Breach of Protocol" - 8:50

Recorded at Koncepts Cultural Gallery in Oakland, CA on May 4, 1991

== Personnel ==
- Henry Threadgill - alto saxophone, flute, bass flute
- Mark Taylor - french horn
- Brandon Ross, Masujaa - electric guitar, acoustic guitar
- Edwin Rodriguez, Marcus Rojas - tuba
- Larry Bright - drums percussion
