= A Thousand Evenings =

Studio album by Dave Douglas
- Released: 2000
- Genre: Jazz
- Label: RCA
- Producer: Dave Douglas

Dave Douglas chronology
Leap of Faith (2000)	A Thousand Evenings (2000)	El Trilogy (2001)

A Thousand Evenings is the 16th album by trumpeter Dave Douglas and the second featuring his Charms of the Night Sky group. It was released on the RCA label in 2000 and features performances by Douglas, Greg Cohen, Mark Feldman and Guy Klucevsek.

== Reception ==
Professional ratings
Review scores
Source	Rating
Allmusic	4/5 stars
The Penguin Guide to Jazz Recordings	3.5/4 stars

The Allmusic review by Sam Samuelson awarded the album 4 stars stating "By 2000 trumpeter Dave Douglas had etched himself as one of the most versatile, intriguing, and important players and composers on the scene... A Thousand Evenings is an example of great musicians keeping their ideals straight in the oft-murky landscape of major-label contemporary jazz, and is highly recommended". On All About Jazz Mark Corroto stated "The meat of this release is two commissioned pieces. “In So Many Words,” dedicated to Jaki Byard, was commissioned by Chamber Music America and “The Branches” by Ashkenaz Festival. The Byard piece feels like a movie soundtrack composition echoing the stated emotional titles by way of classical-jazz-popular inventions. Feldman takes an emotional solo on “Mournful” and the melody of “In Praise” stays with you long after its 5 minutes. “The Branches” returns Douglas to his love for European folk and classical music.". In JazzTimes Bill Shoemaker wrote "A Thousand Evenings has a different feel than Charms of the Night Sky's first outing. Instead of plunging headlong into bottomless depths, the program builds upon contrasts. In a perverse way, the sunnier tracks give some of the album's yearning-filled material a more savory quality".

== Track listing ==
1. "A Thousand Evenings" – 6:48
2. "The Branches: Part 1" – 6:09
3. "The Branches: Part 2" – 7:27
4. "Words for a Loss" – 5:01
5. "Variety" – 3:14
6. "The Little Boy With the Sad Eyes" (Adderley) – 7:09
7. "In So Many Worlds: Ecstatic" – 2:17
8. "In So Many Worlds: Mournful" – 5:05
9. "In So Many Worlds: In Praise" – 5:07
10. "Goldfinger" (Barry, Bricusse, Newley) – 4:13
11. "On Our Way Home" – 4:06
12. "Memories of a Pure Spring" – 9:59

All compositions by Dave Douglas except as indicated

== Personnel ==
- Dave Douglas: trumpet
- Greg Cohen: acoustic bass
- Mark Feldman: violin
- Guy Klucevsek: accordion
