= Present Joys =

Studio album by Dave Douglas & Uri Caine
- Released: July 22, 2014
- Recorded: December 16–17, 2013
- Studio: Avatar, New York City
- Genre: Jazz
- Length: 42:31
- Label: Greenleaf Music
- Producer: Dave Douglas

Dave Douglas chronology
Time Travel (2013)	Present Joys (2014)	Sound Prints (2015)

Uri Caine chronology
Callithump (2014)	Present Joys (2014)	Two Minuettos (2017)

Present Joys is a studio album by trumpeter Dave Douglas and pianist Uri Caine which was released in July 2014 on the Greenleaf Music label. The album follows Douglas' 2012 exploration of hymns, Be Still, by including four songs from the Sacred Harp songbook.

== Reception ==
Professional ratings
Review scores
Source	Rating
AllMusic	3.5/5 stars
The Guardian	4/5 stars
PopMatters	8/10 stars

The AllMusic review by Matt Collar awarded the album 3½ stars out of 5, stating "Ultimately, as the title implies, Present Joys showcases Douglas and Caine interacting in the moment with a thoughtful, creative joy". Writing for The Guardian, John Fordham called it "a 2014 jazz highlight". PopMatters' Will Layman stated "Dave Douglas and Uri Caine are good enough to stand up to making “pretty” music, even traditional music. They pass the test and come out still surprising us".

== Track listing ==
All compositions by Dave Douglas unless indicated

1. "Soar Away" (Alfred Marcus Cagle) - 3:58
2. "Ham Fist" - 5:04
3. "Bethel" - 4:53 (Sacred Harp)
4. "Present Joys" (Cagle) - 4:57
5. "Supplication" (Southern Harmony) - 3:02
6. "Seven Seas" - 4:29
7. "Confidence" (Oliver Holden) - 3:45
8. "End to End" - 3:02
9. "Old Putt" - 3:55
10. "Zero Hour" - 5:26

== Personnel ==
- Dave Douglas - trumpet
- Uri Caine - piano
