= El Trilogy =

Studio album by Dave Douglas
- Released: 2001
- Recorded: 1999 & 2000
- Genre: Jazz
- Label: BMG
- Producer: Dave Douglas

Dave Douglas chronology
A Thousand Evenings (2000)	El Trilogy (2001)	Witness (2001)

El Trilogy is the 17th album by trumpeter Dave Douglas. It was released on the BMG label in 2001 and features music commissioned to accompany performances by the Trisha Brown Dance Company performed by Douglas, Greg Cohen, Mark Feldman, Guy Klucevsek, Gregory Tardy and Susie Ibarra.

== Reception ==
The Allmusic review awarded the album 4½ stars.

Professional ratings
Review scores
Source	Rating
Allmusic	4.5/5 stars

== Track listing ==
1. "Five Part Weather Invention: Aerial Manoeuvres" - 1:11
2. "Five Part Weather Invention: Aria One" - 4:48
3. "Five Part Weather Invention: Bounding Lines" - 4:32
4. "Five Part Weather Invention: Scherzo" - 2:19
5. "Five Part Weather Invention: Aria Two" - 5:20
6. "Rapture To Leon James: Part One" - 13:17
7. "Rapture To Leon James: Part Two" - 8:19
8. "Groove And Countermove: Prairie" - 5:08
9. "Groove And Countermove: Escher" - 4:52
10. "Groove And Countermove: Spring - 7:32
11. "Groove And Countermove: Anton" - 1:19
12. "Groove And Countermove: Fin" - 5:31

All compositions by Dave Douglas

  - Recorded at Avatar Studios, New York City in 1999 and 2000

== Personnel ==
- Dave Douglas – trumpet
- Greg Cohen – acoustic bass
- Mark Feldman – violin (tracks 1–5 & 8–12)
- Guy Klucevsek – accordion (tracks 1–5)
- Gregory Tardy – clarinet, tenor saxophone (tracks 6–12)
- Susie Ibarra – drums, percussion (tracks 6–12)
