= Magic Triangle (Dave Douglas album) =

Studio album by Dave Douglas
- Released: 1998
- Recorded: May 12–13, 1997
- Genre: Jazz
- Length: 56:28
- Label: Arabesque
- Producer: Dave Douglas

Dave Douglas chronology
Charms of the Night Sky (1998)	Magic Triangle (1998)	Convergence (1999)

Magic Triangle is the eleventh album by the trumpeter Dave Douglas. It was released on the Arabesque label in 1998 and contains performances by Douglas, Chris Potter, James Genus, and Ben Perowsky.

== Reception ==
The AllMusic review by Scott Yanow stated: "Falling between hard bop and avant-garde jazz, the music tugs and pushes at the boundaries of the modern mainstream. Douglas varies the tempos and moods from piece to piece, giving listeners not only expertly played performances but a constantly flowing program. Although none of the individual selections have themes that will stay in one's mind after the CD has ended, the solos are consistently strong, the musicians blend together well, and the ensembles are colorful. Well worth exploring".

Professional ratings
Review scores
Source	Rating
AllMusic	3/5 stars
The Penguin Guide to Jazz Recordings	3/4 stars

== Track listing ==
1. "Everyman" - 4:17
2. "Magic Triangle" - 8:20
3. "Padded Cell" - 6:30
4. "Circular" - 8:16
5. "Kisangani" - 6:14
6. "Barrage" - 3:33
7. "Odalisque" - 7:14
8. "Coaster" - 4:08
9. "The Ghost" - 7:56

All compositions by Dave Douglas
- Recorded at Systems Two, Brooklyn on May 12 & 13, 1997

== Personnel ==
- Dave Douglas – trumpet
- Chris Potter – tenor saxophone
- James Genus – bass
- Ben Perowsky – drums
