= The Tiny Bell Trio =

Studio album by Dave Douglas
- Released: 1994
- Recorded: December 21–22, 1993
- Genre: Jazz
- Length: 54:48
- Label: Songlines

Dave Douglas chronology
Parallel Worlds (1993)	The Tiny Bell Trio (1994)	In Our Lifetime (1995)

Professional ratings
Review scores
Source	Rating
Allmusic	3/5 stars
The Penguin Guide to Jazz Recordings	3.5/4 stars

The Tiny Bell Trio is the second album by trumpeter Dave Douglas and the first to feature his Tiny Bell Trio. It was released on the Canadian Songlines label in 1994 and features performances by Douglas, Brad Shepik and Jim Black.

== Reception ==
The Allmusic review by David R. Adler states "the Tiny Bell Trio produces a remarkably full sound despite its sparse instrumentation... Douglas's goal here is to absorb musical influences from the Balkans and Europe... As an early glimpse of Douglas's unconventional brilliance, this one is well worth checking out". The album was identified by Chris Kelsey in his Allmusic essay "Free Jazz: A Subjective History" as one of the 20 Essential Free Jazz Albums.

== Track listing ==
1. "Red Emma" - 4:55
2. "Punchy" - 4:59
3. "Road/Home" - 6:39
4. "Head-On Kouvlodsko" - 5:04
5. "The Drowned Girl" (Weill) - 4:56
6. "La Belle Saison" (Kosma) - 0:43
7. "Song for My Father-In-Law" - 5:47
8. "Shards" - 4:02
9. "Felijar" (Schoeppach) - 5:43
10. "Fille d'Acier (Girl of Steel)" (Kosma) - 4:52
11. "Arabesque for Clarinet and Piano" (Tailleferre) - 3:57
12. "Czardas" (Traditional Hungarian) - 3:11

All compositions by Dave Douglas except as indicated

== Personnel ==
- Dave Douglas: trumpet
- Brad Shepik: guitar
- Jim Black: drums
