= Leap of Faith (Dave Douglas album) =

Studio album by Dave Douglas
- Released: 2000
- Recorded: September 19–20, 1998
- Studio: Avatar, New York City
- Genre: Jazz
- Length: 64:23
- Label: Arabesque
- Producer: Dave Douglas

Dave Douglas chronology
Soul on Soul (2000)	Leap of Faith (2000)	A Thousand Evenings (2001)

Leap of Faith is the 15th album by trumpeter Dave Douglas. It was released on the Arabesque label in 2000 and features performances by Douglas, Chris Potter, James Genus, and Ben Perowsky.

== Reception ==
Professional ratings
Review scores
Source	Rating
Allmusic	3/5 stars
The Penguin Guide to Jazz Recordings	4/4 stars

The Allmusic review by Michael G. Nastos awarded the album 3 stars stating "Listeners with attention spans that allow them to focus on this heady brand of creative modern jazz will easily hear this as one of many triumphs concocted by Douglas in the 1990s. This collaboration is among his better team efforts. Highly recommended". On All About Jazz David Adler stated "Loose, natural interplay is the name of the game here, and Leap of Faith finds the quartet even more loose and natural than last time around. Douglas's writing also seems more varied and inventive". In JazzTimes Peter Margasak wrote " His piano-less quartet on Leap of Faith-tenorist Chris Potter, bassist James Genus, and drummer Ben Perowsky-superficially recalls the telepathic unison playing of the classic Davis quintet with Wayne Shorter, but Douglas' complex, serpentine compositions and the way his rhythm section triggers and prods the front-line into action is worlds apart from that group".

== Track listing ==
1. "Caterwaul" - 3:13
2. "Leap of Faith" - 8:14
3. "Another Country" - 6:07
4. "Millennium Bug" - 6:37
5. "Emmenthaler" - 1:20
6. "Mistaken Identity" - 7:27
7. "Guido's High Note" - 3:10
8. "Continental Divide" - 9:55
9. "Igneous" - 7:32
10. "Western Haiku" - 5:53
11. "Euro Disney" - 4:55

All compositions by Dave Douglas

== Personnel ==
- Dave Douglas: trumpet
- Chris Potter: tenor saxophone
- James Genus: bass
- Ben Perowsky: drums
