= Three Views =

Compilation album by Dave Douglas
- Released: November 22, 2011
- Recorded: January 31, March 17 and June 27, 2011 in Brooklyn, New York
- Genre: Jazz
- Length: 140:36
- Label: Greenleaf Music
- Producer: Dave Douglas

Dave Douglas chronology
United Front: Brass Ecstasy at Newport (2011)	Three Views (2011)	Be Still (2012)

Three Views is a 3CD compilation album by trumpeter Dave Douglas which combines three volumes originally released as music downloads on Greenleaf Music's Portable Series in 2011 and features Douglas' Brass Ecstasy, a Quintet with Ravi Coltrane and Vijay Iyer, and the So Percussion Ensemble.

== Reception ==
Professional ratings
Review scores
Source	Rating
Allmusic	4/5 stars

Allmusic awarded the album 4 stars with Thom Jurek stating "This is an exciting way to hear new works from Douglas. And while it's commendable – and more than likely necessary – that he continues to develop the technological format for distribution of his work, one hopes that he continues to issue physical recordings like this one too". On All About Jazz John Kelman said "Each of the GPS sets reflects a different side of Douglas' approach to playing, writing and band-leading, building on a body of work that's remarkable for its size, depth and breadth. ...With the range of music covered by these inaugural releases in his Greenleaf Portable Series, Douglas demonstrates that the wellspring is far from dry, and that, nearly twenty years after emerging on the scene as a vital force, he remains as expansive, creative and relevant as ever".

== Track listing ==
All compositions by Dave Douglas except as indicated

Greenleaf Portable Series Volume 1: Rare Metals

1. "Town Hall" – 7:06
2. "Night Growl" – 4:13
3. "Lush Life" (Billy Strayhorn) – 7:29
4. "Thread" – 6:01
5. "Safeway" – 5:10
6. "My Old Sign" – 5:50
- Recorded January 31, 2011 at 58 North 6th Street in Brooklyn, NY.

Greenleaf Portable Series Volume 2: Orange Afternoons

1. "The Gulf" – 9:01
2. "Valori Bollati" – 7:22
3. "Solato" – 8:18
4. "Orologi" – 11:38
5. "Orange Afternoons" – 8:24
6. "Frontier Justice" – 4:13
- Recorded March 17, 2011 at 58 North 6th Street in Brooklyn, NY.

Greenleaf Portable Series Volume 3: Bad Mango

1. "One More News" – 4:54
2. "Bad Mango" – 5:45
3. "Nome" – 2:58
4. "Witness" – 8:34
5. "Spider" – 2:50
6. "One Shot" – 5:32
7. "Time Leveler" – 4:59
- Recorded June 27, 2011 at So Percussion Studio, Brooklyn, NY

== Personnel ==
- Dave Douglas: trumpet
- Vincent Chancey: French horn (Volume 1)
- Luis Bonilla: trombone (Volume 1)
- Marcus Rojas: tuba (Volume 1)
- Nasheet Waits: drums (Volume 1)
- Ravi Coltrane: saxophone (Volume 2)
- Vijay Iyer: piano (Volume 2)
- Linda Oh: bass (Volume 2)
- Marcus Gilmore: drums (Volume 2)
- Adam Sliwinski: marimba, toys, concert bass drum, glockenspiel (Volume 3)
- Jason Treuting: drumset, melodica, deskbells (Volume 3)
- Josh Quillen: Korg synthesizer, vocoder, kick drum, snare drum, ride cymbal (Volume 3)
