= Live at the Bimhuis Set 1 & 2 =

Live album by Dave Douglas
- Released: 2005
- Recorded: Bimhuis, Amsterdam, Netherlands
- Genre: Jazz
- Label: Greenleaf

Dave Douglas chronology
Mountain Passages (2005)	Live at the Bimhuis Set 1 & 2 (2005)	Keystone (2005)

Professional ratings
Review scores
Source	Rating
Pittsburgh Tribune-Review	3/4 stars

Live at the Bimhuis Set 1 & 2 is a 2005 live album by jazz trumpeter Dave Douglas. The album was recorded at the Bimhuis in Amsterdam and released by Greenleaf Music.

== Track listing ==
1. "Penelope" - 23:57
2. "The Infinite" - 12:22
3. "Poses" (Wainwright) - 9:22
4. "Caterwaul" - 3:37
5. "Waverly" - 17:35
6. "The Frisell Dream" - 5:12
7. "Unison" (Björk) - 11:44
8. "Ramshackle" (Beck) - 7:57
9. "Deluge" - 23:09

All compositions by Dave Douglas unless otherwise noted

== Personnel ==
- Dave Douglas: trumpet
- Rick Margitza: tenor saxophone, bass clarinet
- Uri Caine: Fender Rhodes
- James Genus: bass
- Clarence Penn: drums
