= Spark of Being =

Box set by Dave Douglas & Keystone
- Released: September 21, 2010
- Length: 158:07
- Label: Greenleaf
- Producer: Dave Douglas

Dave Douglas chronology
A Single Sky (2009)	Spark of Being (2010)	United Front: Brass Ecstasy at Newport (2011)

Spark of Being is a 3-disc box set of music written by Dave Douglas and performed by his electric band, Keystone. Written for the Bill Morrison film by the same name, Spark of Being was commissioned by Stanford University and released by Douglas's Greenleaf Music record label in 2010.

== Background ==
Stanford University commissioned Dave Douglas to write a soundtrack for Bill Morrison's Frankenstein film.

== Recording and music ==
The musicians were part of Douglas's established sextet known as Keystone. In the studio, Douglas encouraged improvisation, so that he would have enough material to edit for release. The music "makes use of the library of sounds at Stanford University's computer music department, which DJ Olive weaves into the live palette of keyboard, bass, drums and Douglas himself on trumpet".

== Release and reception ==
The Spark of Being set was released by Greenleaf Music on September 21, 2010. Greenleaf also issued the three CDs separately: Spark of Being: Soundtrack, which was from the film; Spark of Being: Expand; and Spark of Being: Burst. The first was issued on June 22, 2010; the second was released on September 6 of the same year. All were released by Greenleaf Music, which issued the set of 3 CDs

The Daily Telegraph's reviewer wrote: "The combination of poetic suggestiveness, musical invention and instrumental brilliance is a marvel, and all the more effective for being understated." The JazzTimes reviewer wrote that "Douglas has composed tunes that could work with any instrumentation, and the samples are an extra flavoring – not a gimmick the whole thing depends upon".

== Track listing ==
=== Disc 1: Soundtrack ===
1. Creature Theme, 7:08
2. Spark Of Being, 3:45
3. Observer, 4:02
4. Travelogue, 7:24
5. Prologue, 4:27
6. Tree Ring Circus, 6:29
7. Creature And Friend, 2:56
8. Is It You?, 2:43
9. Chroma, 7:53
10. Observer Claymation, 3:51
11. Observer Animation, 1:02
12. Split Personality, 6:21
13. Creature Alone, 1:40

=== Disc 2: Expand ===
1. Spark Of Being, 3:44
2. Creature, 7:33
3. Tree Ring Circus, 5:42
4. Observer, 4:03
5. Chroma, 7:42
6. Travelogue, 7:56
7. Prologue, 5:52

=== Disc 3: Burst ===
1. Leaving London, 4:26
2. Creature Code, 5:02
3. The Growing Tree, 4:40
4. Vitalism, 7:20
5. Creature Discomfort, 8:08
6. Split Personality Infinitive, 7:42
7. Tree Ring Vamp, 2:14
8. Travelogue (Complete), 7:24
9. Leaving London Reprise, 1:58
10. Creature Theme (Closure), 7:00

== Personnel ==
- Dave Douglas – trumpet
- Marcus Strickland – tenor saxophone
- Adam Benjamin – keyboards
- Brad Jones – bass
- Gene Lake – drums
- DJ Olive – laptop/turntable
