= Soul on Soul =

Studio album by Dave Douglas
- Released: 2000
- Recorded: 1999
- Genre: Jazz
- Label: RCA
- Producer: Dave Douglas

Dave Douglas chronology
Songs for Wandering Souls (1999)	Soul on Soul (2000)	Leap of Faith (2000)

Professional ratings
Review scores
Source	Rating
AllMusic	4.5/5 stars

Soul on Soul is the 14th album by trumpeter Dave Douglas and his first on a major label. It was released on the RCA label in 2000 and features performances by Douglas, Chris Speed, Joshua Roseman, Greg Tardy, Uri Caine, James Genus and Joey Baron. The album includes Douglas' interpretations of four compositions by Mary Lou Williams.

== Reception ==
The AllMusic review by Steve Loewy states " For those who know Douglas only for his forays into the avant-garde, this recording should open some eyes; the trumpeter has a strong handle on the tradition. Actually, this is nothing new, as he has been remarkably at home with a broad collection of styles for years". On All About Jazz, Mark Corroto said "For Douglas' first US major label release, he chose to record music that was accessible to devotees of the Wynton Marsalis revolution as well as Douglas' own legion of fans. Like Mary Lou Williams herself, the sextet takes us from the stride piano styling of Uri Caine to the post-bop saxophone lamentations of Chris Speed and Greg Tardy. It is almost as if Douglas is telling us it can be just as hip to look backward, as it is to look forward. Mary Lou Williams' music affords just such opportunity".

== Track listing ==
All compositions by Dave Douglas except as indicated

1. "Blue Heaven" - 6:23
2. "Ageless" - 7:11
3. "Soul on Soul" - 6:15
4. "Moon of the West" - 7:22
5. "Canticle" - 6:08
6. "Aries" (Williams) - 2:31
7. "Mary's Idea" (Williams) - 2:47
8. "Waltz Boogie" (Williams) - 5:05
9. "Multiples" - 9:51
10. "Kyrie" - 4:12
11. "Zonish" - 6:29
12. "Eleven Years Old" - 1:37
13. "Play It Momma" (Williams) - 3:39
- Recorded at Avatar Studios in NYC

== Personnel ==
- Dave Douglas: trumpet
- Chris Speed: tenor saxophone, clarinet
- Greg Tardy: clarinet, bass clarinet, tenor saxophone
- Josh Roseman: trombone
- Uri Caine: piano
- James Genus: bass
- Joey Baron: drums
