= Gregory Tardy =

American jazz saxophonist (born 1966)

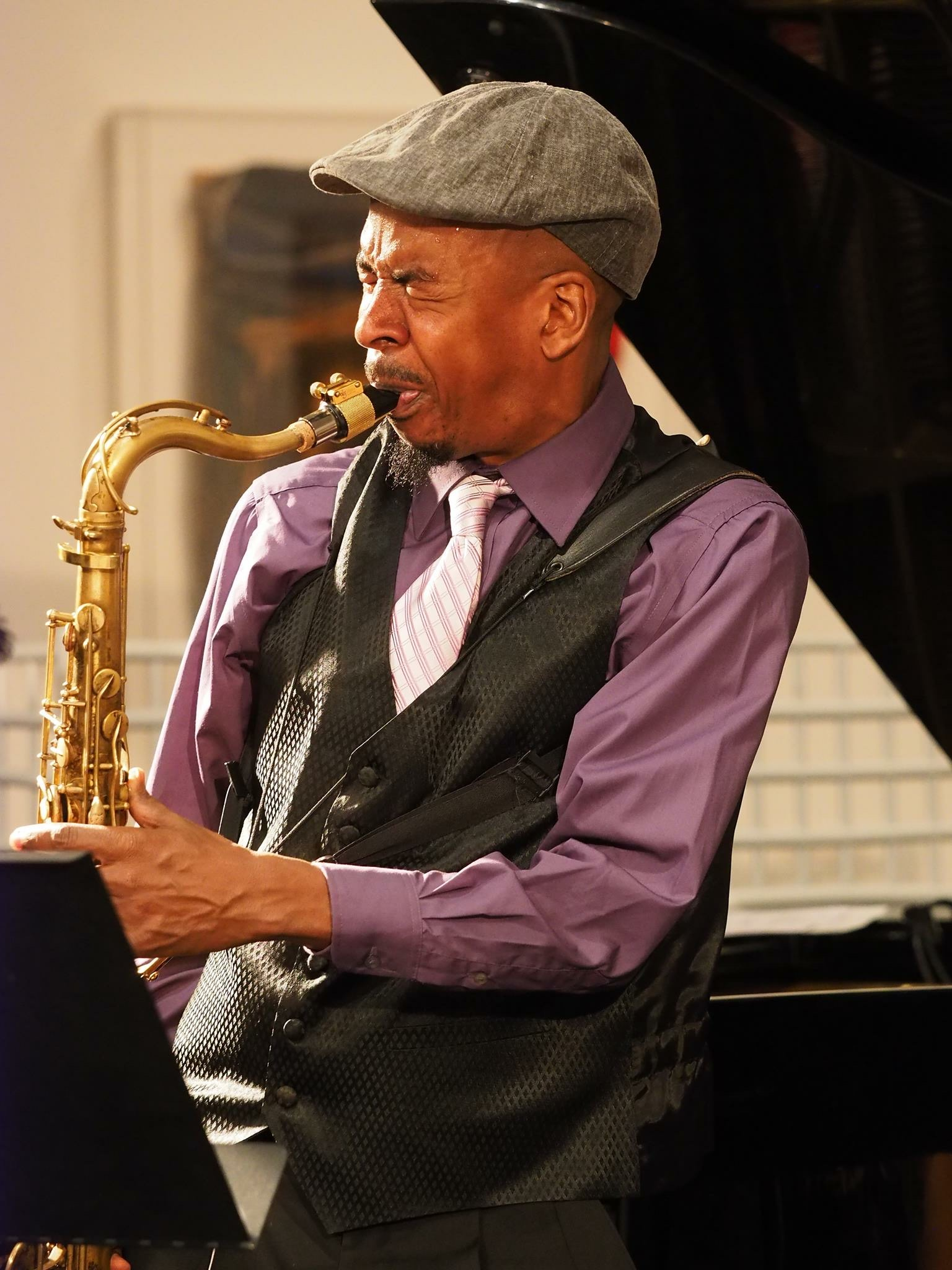
- Gregory Tardy playing at the Jerusalem Jazz Festival in 2017

Background information
- Born: February 3, 1966 (age 60)
- Origin: New Orleans, Louisiana, United States
- Genres: Jazz
- Occupations: Musician, composer, songwriter
- Instruments: Tenor Saxophone, Clarinet
- Website: www.gregorytardy.com

Gregory Tardy (born February 3, 1966) is an American jazz saxophonist and clarinetist, who has released albums for the record labels WJ3 Records SteepleChase Records, J Curve Records, and Impulse! Records. He has played with Elvin Jones, Avishai Cohen, Jazz at Lincoln Center Orchestra with Wynton Marsalis, Aaron Goldberg, Brad Mehldau, and Joshua Redman, among many others.

== Early life and education ==
Born in New Orleans on February 3, 1966, Gregory John Tardy's parents were both opera singers. His mother, Jo Anne Tardy, also recorded as a jazz singer. He trained at Carroll College and the University of Wisconsin as a classical clarinetist. In order to fund his college education he played tenor saxophone in a funk and fusion band. He pursued further studies in jazz harmony at the Wisconsin Conservatory of Music, and later studied at the University of New Orleans.

== Selected discography ==
Name of CD	Release date	Record Company
Crazy Love	1992	DuBat
Serendipity	1998	Impulse!
The Hidden Light	2000	J-Curve
Abundance	2001	Palmetto
The Truth	2005	SteepleChase
Steps Of Faith	2006	SteepleChase
He Knows My Name	2007	SteepleChase
The Strongest Love	2010	SteepleChase
Monuments	2011	SteepleChase
Standards & More	2013	SteepleChase
Hope	2014	SteepleChase
With Songs Of Joy	2015	SteepleChase
Chasing After The Wind	2016	SteepleChase
More Than Enough with Bill Frisell	2019	Newvelle
If Time Could Stand Still	2020	WJ3 Records
Sufficient Grace	2022	WJ3 Records
In His Timing	2023	WJ3 Records
Abide In Love	2025	WJ3 Records

With Tom Harrell

- The Art Of Rhythm (RCA Bluebird, 1998)

With Andrew Hill

- A Beautiful Day (Palmetto, 2002)
- Time Lines (Blue Note, 2006)

With Dave Douglas

- Soul on Soul (RCA Victor, 2000)
- El Trilogy (RCA/BMG, 2001)

With Brian Lynch/Eddie Palmieri Project

- Simpatico (ArtistShare, 2005)

With Chris Potter

- Song for Anyone (Sunnyside, 2007)

With Marcus Printup

- Peace In The Abstract SteepleChase, 1996
- Homage SteepleChase, 2010

With Bill Frisell

- History, Mystery (Nonesuch, 2008)
- Four (Blue Note, 2022)

With Craig Brann

- Advent(ure) SteepleChase, 2012
