= Time Travel (Dave Douglas album) =

Studio album by Dave Douglas Quintet
- Released: April 9, 2013
- Recorded: April 15 & 16, 2012
- Studio: Avatar (New York, New York)
- Genre: Jazz
- Length: 54:01
- Label: Greenleaf Music
- Producer: Dave Douglas

Dave Douglas chronology
Be Still (2012)	Time Travel (2013)	Present Joys (2014)

Time Travel is an album by Dave Douglas' Quintet which was released in April 2013 on the Greenleaf Music label.

== Reception ==
Professional ratings
Review scores
Source	Rating
Allmusic	4/5 stars
All About Jazz	4.5/5 stars

The Allmusic review by Matt Collar awarded the album 4 stars out of 5, stating "While Douglas has made his mark delving into various genre-crossing projects that often skirt the edges of hardcore improvisatory jazz, with Time Travel he has found just as much room to explore within a world of jazz possibilities". Writing for All About Jazz, Troy Collins said "the current incarnation of Douglas' Quintet reflects the independent spirit of a pioneering artist whose intrepid enthusiasm manifests itself in his choice of gifted young collaborators. Lending credence to its title, Time Travel displays the boundless creativity of a group that derives equal inspiration from both past and future". JazzTimes' Geoffrey Himes stated it "may well be the most mainstream jazz album Douglas has ever released". The New York Times critic Nate Chenin ranked the album sixth on his top ten jazz releases of 2013.

== Track listing ==
All compositions by Dave Douglas

1. "Bridge to Nowhere" - 8:25
2. "Time Travel" - 6:21
3. "Law of Historical Memory" - 8:22
4. "Beware of Doug" - 5:50
5. "Little Feet" - 9:17
6. "Garden State" - 5:36
7. "The Pigeon and the Pie" - 10:10

== Personnel ==
- Dave Douglas - trumpet
- Jon Irabagon - tenor saxophone
- Matt Mitchell - piano
- Linda Oh - bass
- Rudy Royston - drums
