= Parallel Worlds (album) =

Studio album by Dave Douglas
- Released: 1993
- Recorded: March 17–18, 1993
- Genre: Jazz
- Length: 63:22
- Label: Soul Note
- Producer: Tim Berne & Dave Douglas

Dave Douglas chronology
Parallel Worlds (1993)	The Tiny Bell Trio (1994)

Parallel Worlds is the debut album by trumpeter Dave Douglas, released on the Italian Soul Note label in 1993. It features six of Douglas' compositions and compositions by Anton Webern, Kurt Weill, Duke Ellington and Igor Stravinsky performed by Douglas, Mark Feldman, Erik Friedlander, Mark Dresser and Michael Sarin.

== Reception ==
Professional ratings
Review scores
Source	Rating
AllMusic	4/5 stars
The Penguin Guide to Jazz Recordings	3.5/4 stars
The Village Voice	A

The AllMusic review by Ron Wynn states: "This isn't another hard bop outing or a completely free-wheeling session; instead, it's got elements of both, and a departure as well. It requires close scrutiny and a completely open mind, because Dave Douglas is following no direction except his own."

== Track listing ==
All compositions by Dave Douglas except as indicated

1. "Sehr Bewegt" (Webern) - 1:29
2. "Parallel Worlds" - 9:16
3. "In Progress" - 5:37
4. "Remains" - 7:07
5. "Piece for Strings" - 6:55
6. "Ballad in Which Macheath Begs All Men for Forgiveness" (Weill) - 6:05
7. "Loco Madi" (Ellington) - 5:53
8. "On Your Leaving" - 7:15
9. "For Every Action" - 9:30
10. "Grand Choral" (Stravinsky) - 4:15
- Recorded at Sear Sound, New York City on March 17 and 18, 1993

== Personnel ==
- Dave Douglas: trumpet
- Mark Feldman: violin
- Erik Friedlander: cello
- Mark Dresser: bass
- Michael Sarin: drums
