= Keystone (album) =

Studio album by Dave Douglas
- Released: 2005
- Recorded: January–May, 2005
- Genre: Jazz
- Label: Greenleaf Music
- Producer: Dave Douglas

Dave Douglas chronology
Live at the Bimhuis Set 1 & 2 (2005)	Keystone (2005)	Meaning and Mystery (2006)

Keystone is the twenty-fifth album by trumpeter Dave Douglas. It was released on the Greenleaf label in 2005 and features performances by Douglas, Jamie Saft, DJ Olive, Gene Lake, Marcus Strickland, and Brad Jones. The music was written to accompany Roscoe 'Fatty' Arbuckle's silent films and a DVD containing the complete film Fatty and Mabel Adrift (1916) and a collage of Arbuckle's scenes set to "Just Another Murder" is included with the album.

== Reception ==
Professional ratings
Review scores
Source	Rating
Allmusic	4/5 stars
All About Jazz	4/5 stars
All About Jazz	4.5/5 stars
The Penguin Guide to Jazz Recordings	3/4 stars

The Allmusic review awarded the album 4 stars stating "Keystone is an excellent, brave, and exciting offering from a man whose talent and vision are perfectly balanced". On All About Jazz Michael McCaw said "Keystone is an incredibly mature-sounding album from Dave Douglas—not because his work up till now has not been complete, but because he has fully integrated the technology and mode of the music first espoused by Miles Davis. Yet he has moved beyond that reference point and created a group sound that is thoroughly modern and doesn't need to push itself to musical extremes to demonstrate mastery". on the same site John Kelman noted "Despite all manner of electronic treatments at work, the core is a real playing band. But what distinguishes Keystone most is that it's Douglas' most groove-oriented album to date—and his most funky". In JazzTimes, David R. Adler wrote "Roscoe "Fatty" Arbuckle, the silent-film legend and the father of pie-in-the-face comedy, has inspired some of the most inviting melodies of Dave Douglas's career. ...Arbuckle may have been the archetypal screwball comic, but Douglas' tribute is remarkably free of camp, restoring a measure of dignity to its subject".

== Track listing ==
1. "A Noise from the Deep" - 6:54
2. "Just Another Murder" - 4:51
3. "Sapphire Sky Blue" - 4:55
4. "Butterfly Effect" - 6:14
5. "Fatty's Day Off" - 2:31
6. "Mabel Normand" - 4:47
7. "The Real Roscoe" - 4:31
8. "Famous Players" - 6:52
9. "Barnyard Flirtations" - 1:42
10. "Hollywood" - 4:19
11. "Tragicomique" - 5:18

All compositions by Dave Douglas

== Personnel ==
- Dave Douglas: trumpet
- Marcus Strickland: saxophone
- Jamie Saft: Wurlitzer piano
- DJ Olive: turntables
- Brad Jones: bass
- Gene Lake: drums
