= A Single Sky =

Studio album by Dave Douglas
- Released: September 29, 2009
- Genre: Jazz
- Length: 62:30
- Label: Greenleaf Music

Dave Douglas chronology
Spirit Moves (2009)	A Single Sky (2009)	Spark of Being (2010)

A Single Sky is the 30th album by Dave Douglas. It was released on the Greenleaf Music label in 2009 and features Douglas with Grammy-winning arranger/conductor Jim McNeely and the Frankfurt Radio Bigband. It is notable for being Dave Douglas's first big band album.

== Reception ==
The Allmusic review by Michael G. Nastos awarded the album 4 stars stating "it's another large feather in the cap for Douglas, the most widely revered progressive jazz musician to appear in the past 20 years, and for many great reasons".

Professional ratings
Review scores
Source	Rating
Allmusic	4/5 stars

== Track list ==
1. The Presidents (comp/arr. – Douglas) – 9:33
2. Bury Me Standing (comp. – Douglas/arr. – McNeely) – 9:58
3. A Single Sky (comp. – Douglas/arr. – McNeely) – 11:12
4. Campaign Trail (comp/arr. – Douglas) – 8:56
5. Tree and Shrub (comp. – Douglas/arr. – McNeely) – 5:02
6. Persistence of Memory (comp. – Douglas/arr. – McNeely) – 11:10
7. Blockbuster (comp/arr. – Douglas) – 6:43

== Personnel ==
- Dave Douglas – trumpet
- Frankfurt Radio Big Band - Jim McNeely – conductor
