= Spirit of Nuff...Nuff =

Studio album by Henry Threadgill
- Released: 1990
- Recorded: November 19, 20, and 21, 1990
- Genre: Jazz
- Length: 58:10
- Label: Black Saint

Henry Threadgill chronology
Rag, Bush and All (1988)	Spirit of Nuff...Nuff (1990)	Live at Koncepts (1991)

Spirit of Nuff...Nuff is an album by Henry Threadgill released on the Black Saint label in 1991 produced by Flavio and Giovanni Bonandrini. The album and features seven of Threadgill's compositions performed by Threadgill's Very Very Circus with Curtis Fowlkes, Brandon Ross, Masujaa, Marcus Rojas, Edwin Rodriguez, and Gene Lake.

== Reception ==
The Allmusic review by Stephen Cook awarded the album 4½ stars, stating, "Henry Threadgill changes direction once again with a two tuba, two guitar, trombone, and drums outfit he calls Very Very Circus. Threadgill's layered, idiosyncratic compositions still abound, but as one would expect from a front line like this, the sound is darker and more dense than on prior releases... Another excellent title from one of jazz's most progressive and original artists".

Professional ratings
Review scores
Source	Rating
Allmusic	4.5/5 stars
The Penguin Guide to Jazz Recordings	3.5/4 stars

== Track listing ==
All compositions by Henry Threadgill

1. "Hope a Hope A" - 7:40
2. "Unrealistic Love" - 10:39
3. "Drivin' You Slow and Crazy" - 10:29
4. "Bee Dee Aff" - 9:28
5. "First Church of This" - 8:04
6. "Exacto" - 5:02
7. "In the Ring" - 6:48

Recorded at R.P.M. Studios, New York City on November 19, 20, and 21, 1990

== Personnel ==
- Henry Threadgill - alto saxophone, flute
- Curtis Fowlkes - trombone
- Brandon Ross, Masujaa - electric guitar
- Marcus Rojas, Edwin Rodriguez - tuba
- Gene Lake - drums
