= Spirit Moves =

Studio album by Dave Douglas
- Released: 2009
- Recorded: December 15 & 16, 2008 in Brooklyn, New York
- Genre: Jazz
- Length: 53:08
- Label: Greenleaf Music

Dave Douglas chronology
Moonshine (2007)	Spirit Moves (2009)	A Single Sky (2009)

Spirit Moves is the 29th album by trumpeter Dave Douglas. It was released on the Greenleaf Music label in 2009 and features Douglas band Brass Ecstasy.

== Reception ==
Professional ratings
Review scores
Source	Rating
Allmusic	4/5 stars
PopMatters	8/10 stars

The Allmusic review by Thom Jurek awarded the album 4 stars stating "In sum, Spirit Moves is a welcome departure for Douglas, who has been working with his longtime electric band and more recently with his great Keystone group. It's beautiful because, though it moves radically from the concerns of his other groups, it does indeed restate his deep love for the tradition while expressing his forward-thinking notions of group interplay as well as his own healthy, warm sense of humor". In JazzTimes, Josef Woodard wrote "On Spirit Moves, Douglas puts an intriguing songbook of originals and inventively retreated cover songs before his able and aesthetically willing brass cohorts". PopMatters Will Layman observed "It is a project that, beginning from its name, ought to be a kind of tribute. And it is, in part. But the best tribute to Lester Bowie, of course, is to do something original and surprising. And Dave Douglas manages that here by using a smaller band that remains rich, subtle, impressionistic, and versatile—but still fun. Maybe it was a bit arrogant to name his latest band Brass Ecstasy. But, you know, that’s what it is".

== Track listing ==
All compositions by Dave Douglas except as indicated

1. This Love Affair (Rufus Wainwright) – 3:25
2. Orujo – 3:38
3. The View from Blue Mountain – 4:53
4. Twilight of the Dogs – 4:06
5. Bowie – 6:27
6. Rava – 5:36
7. Fats – 3:48
8. The Brass Ring – 7:56
9. Mr. Pitiful (Redding/Cropper) – 3:05
10. I'm So Lonesome I Could Cry (Williams Sr) – 4:18
11. Hope (bonus) – 6:05
12. Prayer For Baghdad (bonus) – 5:18

== Personnel ==
- Dave Douglas: trumpet
- Vincent Chancey: French horn
- Luis Bonilla: trombone
- Marcus Rojas: tuba
- Nasheet Waits: drums
