= Convergence (Dave Douglas album) =

Studio album by Dave Douglas
- Released: 1998
- Recorded: January 22–23, 1998
- Genre: Jazz
- Length: 71:47
- Label: Soul Note
- Producer: Dave Douglas

Dave Douglas chronology
Magic Triangle (1998)	Convergence (1998)	Songs for Wandering Souls (1999)

Convergence is the 12th album by trumpeter Dave Douglas. It was released on the Italian Soul Note label in 1998 and features performances by Douglas, Mark Feldman, Erik Friedlander, Drew Gress and Michael Sarin.

== Reception ==
The Penguin Guide to Jazz selected this album as part of its suggested Core Collection.

The Allmusic review by Alex Henderson awarded the album 4½ stars stating "You can hear a variety of influences in Douglas' playing -- everyone from Lester Bowie and Don Cherry to Miles Davis and Booker Little -- but Convergence leaves no doubt that he is very much an original himself".

Professional ratings
Review scores
Source	Rating
Penguin Guide to Jazz	4/4 stars
Allmusic	4.5/5 stars

== Track listing ==
1. "Chit Kyoo Thwe Tog Nyin Hmar Lar" (Traditional Burmese) - 1:13
2. "Joe's Auto Glass" - 6:31
3. "Tzotzil Maya" - 7:47
4. "Meeting At Infinity" - 15:53
5. "Desseins Eternels" (Messiaen) - 4:08
6. "Bilbao Song" (Weill) - 8:36
7. "Border Stories: The Story" - 0:30
8. "Border Stories: The Elaboration" - 0:55
9. "Border Stories: The Exaggeration" - 0:41
10. "Border Stories: Apocrypha" - 0:43
11. "Collateral Damages" - 6:59
12. "Goodbye Tony" - 13:37
13. "Nothing Like You" (Dorough, Landesman) - 4:14

All compositions by Dave Douglas except as indicated

  - Recorded at Sound on Sound, New York City on January 22 and 23, 1998

== Personnel ==
- Dave Douglas – trumpet
- Mark Feldman – violin
- Erik Friedlander – cello
- Drew Gress – bass
- Michael Sarin – drums
