= In Our Lifetime (Dave Douglas album) =

Studio album by Dave Douglas
- Released: 1995
- Recorded: December 7–8, 1994
- Genre: Jazz
- Length: 54:48
- Label: New World
- Producer: Marty Ehrlich & Dave Douglas

Dave Douglas chronology
The Tiny Bell Trio (1994)	In Our Lifetime (1995)	Constellations (1995)

Professional ratings
Review scores
Source	Rating
Allmusic	4.5/5 stars
The Penguin Guide to Jazz Recordings	4/4 stars

In Our Lifetime is the third album by trumpeter Dave Douglas. It was released on the New World label in 1995 and features performances by Douglas, Josh Roseman, Chris Speed, Marty Ehrlich, Uri Caine, James Genus and Joey Baron. The album features Douglas' interpretations of three compositions by Booker Little and nine of his originals.

== Reception ==
The Allmusic review by Scott Yanow states "Trumpeter Dave Douglas's New World CD is consistently intriguing, the type of music that gains in interest with each listening".

== Track listing ==
1. "In Our Lifetime" - 10:16
2. "Three Little Monsters" - 5:20
3. "Forward Flight" (Little) - 6:54
4. "The Persistence of Memory" - 4:37
5. "Out in the Cold" - 6:26
6. "Strength and Sanity" (Little) - 4:47
7. "Sappho" - 0:49
8. "At Dawn" - 4:07
9. "Shred" - 2:41
10. "Rapid Ear Movement" - 1:36
11. "Moods in Free Time" (Little) - 5:40
12. "Bridges (For Tim Berne)" - 17:44

All compositions by Dave Douglas except as indicated

== Personnel ==
- Dave Douglas: trumpet
- Josh Roseman: trombone
- Chris Speed: clarinet, tenor saxophone
- Uri Caine: piano
- James Genus: bass
- Joey Baron: drums
- Marty Ehrlich: bass clarinet (track 1)
