= Witness (Dave Douglas album) =

Studio album by Dave Douglas
- Released: 2001
- Recorded: December 13 & 14, 2000
- Studio: Avatar, New York City
- Genre: Jazz
- Length: 66:47
- Label: RCA
- Producer: Dave Douglas

Dave Douglas chronology
El Trilogy (2001)	Witness (2001)	The Infinite (2002)

Witness is the 18th album by trumpeter Dave Douglas. It was released on the RCA label in 2001 and features performances by Douglas, Chris Speed, Joe Daley, Mark Feldman, Erik Friedlander, Drew Gress, Bryan Carrott, Michael Sarin, Ikue Mori, Joshua Roseman and Yuka Honda with Tom Waits providing vocals on one track.

== Reception ==
Professional ratings
Review scores
Source	Rating
Allmusic	4/5 stars

The Allmusic review by Alex Henderson awarded the album 4 stars stating "One of the things that makes Dave Douglas such a compelling voice in avant-garde jazz is his open-mindedness. The New York-based trumpeter has made a point of exposing himself to a wide variety of music -- everything from Lester Bowie's innovations to classical to East European folk -- and his willingness to be influenced by so many different things has made for a lot of fresh, adventurous albums. Witness is no exception; this 2001 release finds the jazzman being affected by classical as well as Middle Eastern and North African music... Witness is yet another album that Douglas can be proud of". On All About Jazz David Adler stated "With Witness, Dave Douglas's first overtly political album, the trumpeter/composer stimulates our imaginations even as he encourages us to confront global injustice". In JazzTimes Doug Ramsey wrote "Dave Douglas focuses his artist's conscience and political acuity on our time and finds plenty to protest. His Witness, initially inspired by arms profiteering during the war in Yugoslavia, also concerns itself with the suppression of political rights, social justice and feminist aspirations. The music calls on the tradition of his jazz predecessors and contemporaries but also draws from Balinese, African and Middle Eastern forms and, heavily, from modern classical composers like Lutoslawski, Ligeti, Stockhausen and, one suspects, Steve Reich ...How would the music stand on its own if a listener didn't know it was protest music? Pretty well. It's interesting stuff. There might be puzzlement about his category, but there would be no doubt about Douglas' passion".

== Track listing ==
All compositions by Dave Douglas

1. "Ruckus" - 4:45
2. "Witness" - 8:16
3. "One More News" - 3:03
4. "Woman at Point Zero" - 7:40
5. "Kidnapping Kissinger" - 3:02
6. "Mahfouz" - 23:51
7. "Episode for Taslima Nasrin" - 4:41
8. "Child of All Nations" - 7:14
9. "Sozaboy" - 3:59

== Personnel ==
- Dave Douglas: trumpet
- Mark Feldman: violin
- Chris Speed: tenor saxophone, clarinet
- Joe Daley: tuba
- Erik Friedlander: cello
- Drew Gress: bass
- Bryan Carrott: vibraphone, marimba
- Michael Sarin: drums
- Ikue Mori: electronics

with guests:

- Joshua Roseman: trombone (1, 4, 6, 9)
- Yuka Honda: sampling keyboard (1, 6)
- Tom Waits: vocals (6)
