= Live at the Jazz Standard (Dave Douglas album) =

Live album by Dave Douglas Quintet
- Released: 2007
- Recorded: December 5–10, 2006
- Venue: Jazz Standard, NYC
- Genre: Jazz
- Label: Greenleaf
- Producer: Dave Douglas

Dave Douglas Quintet chronology
Meaning and Mystery (2006)	Live at the Jazz Standard (2007)	Moonshine (2007)

Download Cover

Live at the Jazz Standard is the 27th album by trumpeter Dave Douglas and the first to feature him exclusively on cornet. It was released on the Greenleaf label in 2007 and features live performances by Douglas, Donny McCaslin, Uri Caine, James Genus and Clarence Penn. Douglas recorded his Quintet's performances at the Jazz Standard nightclub in New York City in December 2006 making all twelve complete sets available for download within days of the performances. This 2-CD set was distilled from those concerts.

== Reception ==
Professional ratings
Review scores
Source	Rating
AllMusic	4.5/5 stars
All About Jazz	4.5/5 stars
The Penguin Guide to Jazz Recordings	4/4 stars

The Allmusic review by Matt Collar awarded the album 4½ stars stating "This is soulful, visceral, moody and propulsive post-bop that often leans heavily toward late-'60s and '70s modal and free jazz". On All About Jazz John Kelman said "As undeniably superb as the quintet's studio albums are, the group has never sounded this hot". Alarm magazine's Ryan McCarthy wrote "Douglas crafts many brilliant melodies, and the soloing is top-tier, though often soiled by the lack of bite where the nitty-gritty rhythm should be. Live at the Jazz Standard is a showcase for Douglas and Caine controlling their mediums, needless of a supporting cast".

== Track listing ==
All compositions by Dave Douglas

1. "Earmarks" - 5:58
2. "Tree and Shrub" - 4:01
3. "War Room" - 5:18
4. "Indian Point" - 11:16
5. "The Cornet Is a Fickle Friend" - 1:53
6. "The Next Phase (For Thomas)" - 7:25
7. "October Surprise" - 9:21
8. "Seth Thomas" - 10:23
9. "Meaning and Mystery" - 7:59
10. "Navigations" - 8:50
11. "Redemption" - 4:54
12. "Little Penn" - 8:26
13. "Living Streams" - 6:27
14. "Leaving Autumn" - 8:41
15. "Magic Triangle" - 7:00
16. "A Single Sky" - 10:40

== 12 Set Download ==
The Dave Douglas Quintet's performed two sets each night over their six-night residency at the Jazz Standard jazz club in New York City in December 2006. Each set was recorded and offered as a music download on the Greenleaf website the day after it was performed for $7.00 per set. Purchasers of the entire 12 sets were sent physical copies of the 2-CD album as a bonus gift.

Tuesday, December 5: Set I

1. "Padded Cell" - 4:08
2. "Invocation" - 11:53
3. "October Surprise" - 9:58
4. "Just Say This" - 7:25
5. "Elk's Club" - 8:19
6. "Argo" - 6:11
7. "A Single Sky" - 9:29

Tuesday, December 5: Set II

1. "Earmarks" - 5:54
2. "Culture Wars" - 17:00
3. "The Next Phase (For Thomas)" - 7:21
4. "Tree and Shrub" - 6:01
5. "Indian Point" - 9:51
6. "Little Penn" - 8:42

Wednesday, December 6: Set I

1. "Penelope" - 14:40
2. "Painter's Way" - 5:51
3. "Living Streams" - 5:25
4. "Skeeter-ism" - 6:41
5. "Meaning & Mystery" - 7:54
6. "Seventeen" - 19:09

Wednesday, December 6: Set II

1. "Waverly" - 15:10
2. "Blues to Steve Lacy" - 8:04
3. "Seth Thomas" - 6:34
4. "Redemption" - 4:48
5. "The Cornet Is a Fickle Friend" - 1:48
6. "Ramshackle" - 5:09
7. "The Team" - 15:53

Thursday, December 7: Set I

1. "Passing Through" - 13:26
2. "Earmarks" - 5:58
3. "Unison" (Björk) - 9:40
4. "Navigations" - 8:51
5. "Twombly Infinites" - 3:55
6. "Deluge" - 14:51

Thursday, December 7: Set II

1. "Strange Liberation" - 12:02
2. "Leaving Autumn" - 8:36
3. "Caterwaul" - 5:04
4. "Elk's Club" - 8:17
5. "The Next Phase (For Thomas)" - 7:21
6. "War Room" - 5:16
7. "Tim Bits" - 11:35

Friday, December 8: Set I

1. "Invocation" - 12:53
2. "Tree and Shrub" - 5:57
3. "The Cornet Is a Fickle Friend" - 1:48
4. "Blues to Steve Lacy" - 6:58
5. "Argo" - 5:13
6. "Ramshackle" - 7:01
7. "Rock of Billy" - 15:56

Friday, December 8: Set II

1. "The Infinite" - 12:06
2. "Living Streams" - 6:20
3. "Crazy Games" (Mary J. Blige, Kenneth Dickerson) - 7:02
4. "Poses" (Rufus Wainwright) - 8:15
5. "Indian Point" - 11:11
6. "Culture Wars" - 19:21

Saturday, December 9: Set I

1. "Penelope" - 13:34
2. "Painter's Way" - 6:23
3. "Frisell Dream" - 5:05
4. "Nine Cloud Dream" - 9:17
5. "Magic Triangle" - 6:52
6. "A Single Sky" - 10:58

Saturday, December 9: Set II

1. "Deluge" - 12:36
2. "Earmarks" - 5:37
3. "Unison" (Björk) - 10:24
4. "Padded Cell" - 4:36
5. "Elk's Club" - 6:37
6. "Sheik of Things to Come" - 8:48
7. "Seventeen" - 13:34

Sunday, December 10: Set I

1. "Passing Through" - 13:31
2. "Caterwaul" - 5:19
3. "Tree and Shrub" - 3:45
4. "Seth Thomas" - 10:19
5. "Twombly Infinites" - 3:03
6. "War Room" - 5:36
7. "Just Say This" - 7:42
8. "Little Penn" - 8:49

Sunday, December 10: Set II

1. "October Surprise" - 9:15
2. "Tim Bits" - 11:15
3. "Navigations" - 9:17
4. "The Next Phase (For Thomas)" - 8:46
5. "The Infinite" - 12:19
6. "The Team" - 18:12

== Personnel ==
- Dave Douglas: cornet
- Donny McCaslin: tenor saxophone
- Uri Caine: Fender Rhodes
- James Genus: bass
- Clarence Penn: drums, percussion
