= Mountain Passages =

Studio album by Dave Douglas
- Released: 2005
- Recorded: June 2003 in Vancouver, British Columbia in Canada
- Genre: Jazz
- Length: 54:22
- Label: Greenleaf
- Producer: Dave Douglas

Dave Douglas chronology
Bow River Falls (2004)	Mountain Passages (2005)	Live at the Bimhuis Set 1 & 2 (2005)

Mountain Passages is the 23rd album by trumpeter Dave Douglas and the first released on his own Greenleaf Music label in 2005. It features performances by Douglas, Michael Moore, Marcus Rojas, Peggy Lee, and Dylan van der Schyff.

== Reception ==
Professional ratings
Review scores
Source	Rating
Allmusic	4/5 stars
PopMatters	8/10 stars
The Penguin Guide to Jazz Recordings	4/4 stars

The Allmusic review by Thom Jurek awarded the album 4 stars stating "Mountain Passages is another large compositional step for Douglas, whose aesthetic ambition is boundless and whose ability to execute that vision is seemingly limitless". On All About Jazz Brand Reiter said "The music is at turns solemn, whimsical, darkly melancholic and plaintively gorgeous, but what exactly is it? Jazz? Well, yeah... sort of... maybe... sure. It's certainly as much jazz as it is as anything else and—like all Douglas' explorations—undeniably worth your attention". In JazzTimes, Thomas Conrad wrote "Mountain Passages (like the Ladino music of the Northern Mediterranean that partly inspired it) modulates between extremes of the contemplative and the raucous. The alchemy of instrumental sonorities is unique (trumpet both open and muted, cello both pizzicato and arco, three reed instruments in turn) and the genre is classifiable only as Douglas-music: too formally notated for jazz, too hard-driven for chamber music". PopMatters Will Layman observed "Dave Douglas made great music for RCA, but on his own imprint he seems to be even freer and more exultant—a guy with a trumpet and all of jazz history to draw on, not to mention every other kind of music under the white clouds that shade our listening. Mountain Passages makes you want to breath it all in".

== Track listing ==
All compositions by Dave Douglas

1. "Summit Music" - 3:55
2. "Family Of The Climber" - 4:17
3. "Gnarly Schnapps" - 2:02
4. "Gumshoe" - 3:38
5. "Twelve Degrees Proof" - 4:15
6. "North Point Memorial" - 4:32
7. "Cannonball Run" - 4:43
8. "Palisades" - 3:21
9. "A Nasty Spill" - 7:27
10. "Purple Mountains Majesty" - 1:49
11. "Off Major" - 2:45
12. "Bury Me Standing" - 7:41
13. "Encore: All Is Forgiven" - 3:33

== Personnel ==
- Dave Douglas: trumpet
- Michael Moore: alto saxophone, clarinet, bass clarinet
- Marcus Rojas: tuba
- Peggy Lee: cello
- Dylan van der Schyff: drums
