= Callithump =

Studio album by Uri Caine
- Released: February 14, 2014
- Recorded: December 13, 2012
- Studios: Avatar, New York City
- Genre: Jazz
- Length: 53:09
- Labels: Winter & Winter; 910 210
- Producer: Stefan Winter

Uri Caine chronology
Rhapsody in Blue (2013)	Callithump (2014)	Present Joys (2014)

Callithump is a solo album by pianist Uri Caine which was released in February 2014 on the Winter & Winter label.

== Reception ==
Professional ratings
Review scores
Source	Rating
The Sydney Morning Herald	4/5 stars
PopMatters	8/10 stars

Writing for The Sydney Morning Herald, John Shand observed "the American prefers to remind us of the wonder of the piano being equally capable of a delicacy so diaphanous that it rivals a harp. Meanwhile its phenomenal range and harmonic and dynamic potential make it the solo instrument par excellence... This direct-to-two-track analogue recording captures all the dynamism of his solo playing. It seduces with what ABC Classic FM would call "swoon" music, dazzles with invention and bullies with 88-note cyclones". PopMatters' Will Layman stated "Callithump is both atypically normal and classic Caine... the stylistic range and sense of genre is massive, all-engulfing. And fantastic... Ultimately, you come to the end of Callithump exhilarated with the possibilities of a piano, a man, a space".

== Track listing ==
All compositions by Uri Caine

1. "Callithump" - 3:35
2. "Sepharad" - 7:02
3. "Map of the Heart" - 4:30
4. "Greasy" - 4:25
5. "The Magic of Her Nearness" - 6:15
6. "Chanson de Johnson" - 3:27
7. "Bow Bridge" - 4:12
8. "Everything Is Bullshit" - 3:54
9. "Raindrop Prelude" - 5:28
10. "Perving Berlin" - 5:33
11. "Dotted Eyes" - 4:48

== Personnel ==
- Uri Caine - piano
