= Guy Klucevsek =

American-born accordionist and composer (1947–2025)

Background information
- Born: February 26, 1947; New York City
- Died: May 22, 2025 (aged 78) Staten Island
- Occupation: Musician
- Instrument: Accordion
- Formerly of: Accordion Tribe

Guy Klucevsek (February 26, 1947 – May 22, 2025) was an American accordionist and composer known for his fusion of polka, minimalism and experimental music. He began playing accordion at age five and later studied at the California Institute of the Arts. Klucevsek taught at Glassboro State College before emerging as a figure in the Downtown New York experimental scene. Over his career, he composed over 100 works, released more than 20 albums, and collaborated with artists such as John Zorn, Tom Waits, Laurie Anderson, and Bill Frisell. He was also active in cross-cultural collaborations and contributed to several John Williams film scores. In 2010, he received a United States Artists Fellowship. He stopped touring in 2018 due to illness and died in 2025.

== Life and career ==
Klucevsek, who was of Slovenian heritage, was born in New York City on February 26, 1947, and raised in New Jersey and outside of Pittsburgh, Pennsylvania. At the age of five he began playing the accordion after seeing a performance by Dick Contino on television. He studied accordion with Walter Grabowski who eventually introduced him to the more difficult free-bass accordion. This allowed Klucevsek to play straight from piano music without transcription. In high school he formed a Slovenian polka band and played tuba in the school band. After graduating from high school, he matriculated to Indiana University of Pennsylvania where he earned a BA in 1969. He pursued further studies at the University of Pittsburgh and graduated with an MA in 1971. He then attended the California Institute of the Arts where he was a pupil of Robert Bernat, Harold Budd, Gerald Shapiro, Morton Subotnick, and James Tenney.

In 1972, Klucevsek joined the faculty of Glassboro State College now (Rowan University) where he taught until 1976. He was a member of Relâche, a chamber ensemble based in Philadelphia, from 1980 through 1990. He moved to Manhattan in the 1980s where he was involved in the Downtown experimental music scene and first met his long time collaborator John Zorn. His first album, Blue Window, was released in 1986. Over his career Klucevsek composed more than 100 pieces, released more than 20 albums and collaborated with Dave Douglas, Bill Frisell, Laurie Anderson, Maureen Fleming, Tom Waits and others. He was also a founding member of the international group Accordion Tribe. Klucevsek also participated in cross-cultural collaborations including with Basque accordionist Kepa Junkera, oud player Rahim AlHaj and Japanese composer Teiji Ito.

Klucevsek worked on John Williams's scores for several Steven Spielberg films, including The Terminal, Indiana Jones and the Kingdom of the Crystal Skull, and The Adventures of Tintin. In 2010, Klucevsek won a United States Artists Fellow award. With a string quartet and Renée Fleming, he performed “Danny Boy” at John McCain's funeral at the Washington National Cathedral.

He stopped touring in 2018 due to illness and last publicly performed in 2022. Klucevsek died at home in Staten Island on May 22, 2025, at the age of 78, after battling neuroendocrine cancer for nearly ten years.

== Musical style ==
While Klucevsek's music sometimes fits within traditional polka styles it moves far beyond this into experimentalism and minimalism. Klucevsek was influenced by Flaco Jimenez and Nathan Abshire which led him to look to integrate his Slovenian-American heritage into his avant-garde music. His polkas would often be in minor keys and played at great speed rather than the genial pace and major key of traditional polkas. Klucevsek was reluctant to label himself and his style but thought of himself as a composer rather than an accordionist. His music was unique in employing the accordion in jazz and improvisational music.

== Discography ==
=== As leader ===
- Blue Window (Zoar Records, 1986)
- Scenes from a Mirage (Review, 1987)
- Who Stole the Polka? (Eva, 1991)
- Flying Vegetables of the Apocalypse (Experimental Intermedia, 1991)
- Polka Dots & Laser Beams (Eva, 1992)
- Manhattan Cascade (CRI, 1992)
- Transylvanian Softwear (John Marks, 1994)
- Citrus, My Love (RecRec Music, 1995)
- Stolen Memories (Tzadik, 1996)
- Altered Landscapes (EVVA, 1998)
- Accordance with Alan Bern (Winter & Winter, 2000)
- Free Range Accordion (Starkland, 2000)
- The Heart of the Andes (Winter & Winter, 2002)
- Tales from the Cryptic with Phillip Johnston (Winter & Winter, 2003)
- Notefalls with Alan Bern (Winter & Winter, 2007)
- Song of Remembrance (Tzadik, 2007)
- Dancing On the Volcano (Tzadik, 2009)
- The Multiple Personality Reunion Tour (Innova, 2012)
- Teetering On the Verge of Normalcy (Starkland, 2016)

With Accordion Tribe

- Accordion Tribe (Intuition, 1998)
- Sea of Reeds (Intuition, 2002)
- Lunghorn Twist (Intuition, 2006)

=== As sideman ===
With Dave Douglas

- Charms of the Night Sky (Winter & Winter, 1998)
- A Thousand Evenings (BMG/RCA Victor, 2000)
- El Trilogy (BMG/RCA Victor, 2001)

With others

- Rahim AlHaj, Little Earth (UR Music, 2010)
- Laurie Anderson, Bright Red (Warner Bros., 1994)
- Laurie Anderson, Life On a String (Nonesuch, 2001)
- Boston Pops Orchestra & Keith Lockhart, Lights, Camera, Music! (BSO Classics, 2017)
- Anthony Braxton, 4 (Ensemble) Compositions 1992 (Black Saint, 1993)
- Mary Ellen Childs, Kilter (Experimental Intermedia, 1999)
- Anthony Coleman, Disco by Night (Avant, 1992)
- Nicolas Collins, It Was a Dark and Stormy Night (Trace Elements, 1992)
- Lukas Foss, Music by Lukas Foss (CRI, 1980)
- Bill Frisell, Have a Little Faith (Elektra Nonesuch, 1993)
- Fred Frith, Stone, Brick, Glass, Wood, Wire (I Dischi di Angelica, 1999)
- David Garland, Control Songs (Review, 1986)
- David Garland, Togetherness: Control Songs Vol. 2 (Ergodic, 1999)
- Robin Holcomb, Rockabye (Elektra Musician 1992)
- Phillip Johnston, Music for Films (Tzadik, 1998)
- Jerome Kitzke, The Character of American Sunlight (Innova, 2013)
- Mary Jane Leach, 4BC/Green Mountain Madrigal/Lake Eden/Trio for Duo (1987)
- Natalie Merchant, Motherland (Elektra, 2001)
- Michael Moore, Holocene (Ramboy, 2008)
- Phill Niblock, The Movement of PeopleWorking (Extreme/Microcinema, 2008)
- Pauline Oliveros, Tara's Room + Sounding Way (Important, 2019)
- Bobby Previte, Claude's Late Morning (Gramavision, 1988)
- Relache, Here and Now (Callisto, 1983)
- John Zorn, The Big Gundown (Nonesuch, 1986)
- John Zorn, Cobra (Hat Hut, 1987)
- Peter Zummo, Zummo with an X (New World, 2006)
- Peter Zummo, Lateral Pass (Foom, 2014)
- Tom Waits, Orphans: Brawlers, Bawlers & Bastards (Anti-, 2006)
- Tom Waits, Orphans: Bastards (Anti-, 2018)

== Sources ==
- Franklin, Joseph, Settling scores: a life in the margins of American music, Sunstone Press, 2006. ISBN 0-86534-477-9
- Jenkins, Todd S. "Klucevsek, Guy", Free jazz and free improvisation: An encyclopedia, Volume 2, Greenwood Publishing Group, 2004, p. 200. ISBN 0-313-33314-9.
- Ross, Alex, Classical Music in Review: Guy Klucevsek Accordionist, Dance Theater Workshop, New York Times, 2 October 1993
- Wolk, Douglas, "A world of squeezeboxes", CMJ New Music Monthly, May 1997, p. 10
