= Meaning and Mystery =

Studio album by Dave Douglas
- Released: 2006
- Recorded: February 1, 2006
- Genre: Jazz
- Label: Greenleaf Music
- Producer: Dave Douglas

Dave Douglas chronology
Live at the Bimhuis Set 1 & 2 (2005)	Meaning and Mystery (2006)	Live at the Jazz Standard (2006)

Meaning and Mystery is the 26th album by trumpeter Dave Douglas. It was released on the Greenleaf label in 2006 and features performances by Douglas, Donny McCaslin, Uri Caine, James Genus and Clarence Penn.

== Reception ==
Professional ratings
Review scores
Source	Rating
Allmusic	3.5/5 stars
All About Jazz	4.5/5 stars
The Penguin Guide to Jazz Recordings	4/4 stars

The Allmusic review by Thom Jurek awarded the album 3½ stars stating "Meaning and Mystery is yet another album in the Douglas catalog that showcases his fine compositional and arrangement abilities, but more than this, it's the sound of a group in the process of continued restless development long after the bandmembers have found their collective voice". On All About Jazz Paul Olsen said "Meaning and Mystery is yet another superlative recording from Douglas. Will his well of inspiration never run dry?". In JazzTimes, Steve Greenlee wrote "Meaning and Mystery, is a fully realized statement by a band that draws on the high points of jazz history and breaks new ground".

== Track listing ==
All compositions by Dave Douglas

1. "Painter's Way" - 5:29
2. "Culture Wars" - 12:46
3. "The Sheik of Things to Come" - 7:45
4. "Blues to Steve Lacy" - 5:55
5. "Tim Bits" - 5:31
6. "Twombly Infinites" - 2:28
7. "Elk's Club" - 5:40
8. "Invocation" - 7:54
9. "The Team" - 7:46

== Personnel ==
- Dave Douglas: trumpet
- Donny McCaslin: tenor saxophone
- Uri Caine: Fender Rhodes
- James Genus: bass
- Clarence Penn: drums, percussion
