= Marcus Rojas =

American musician (b. 1963)

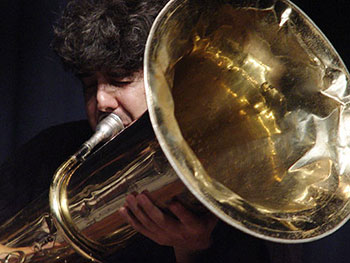
- Rojas in 2007

Background information
- Born: February 23, 1963 (age 63); New York City, New York, U.S.
- Genres: Jazz, classical, chamber music
- Occupation: Musician
- Instrument: Tuba
- Formerly of: Spanish Fly

Marcus Rojas (born February 23, 1963) is an American tubist from New York City.

== Early life ==
Rojas was born in New York City on February 23, 1963, and grew up in Red Hook, Brooklyn. His early influences included Eddie Palmieri, Willie Colón, and uncles who played percussion and trombone. He began on trombone at elementary school, then changed to tuba in junior high school. At age 15, Rojas began lessons with tubist Samuel Pilafian. He went on to attend the High School of Music & Art in New York, and studied further at the New England Conservatory.

== Career ==
"After graduation, he moved back to New York and started to work with a wide variety of musicians in different settings, including bassist Charlie Haden's Liberation Music Orchestra, composer-saxophonist Henry Threadgill's Very Very Circus, trumpeter Lester Bowie's Brass Fantasy." He has played in the orchestras of the Metropolitan Opera and the New York City Ballet.

Rojas formed the trio Spanish Fly with Steven Bernstein and David Tronzo in 1989. He has also worked with the American Symphony Orchestra, Foetus, Sly & Robbie, and John Zorn.

He has taught at New York University, State University of New York at Purchase, and Brooklyn College.

== Discography ==
=== As co-leader ===
- Brass Bang! with Steven Bernstein, Paolo Fresu, Gianluca Petrella (Bonsai/Tuk, 2014)
- Tattoos And Mushrooms with Steven Bernstein, Kresten Osgood (ILK Music, 2009)

=== As sideman ===
With Bob Belden

- 1991 Straight to My Heart: The Music of Sting
- 2001 Black Dahlia

With David Byrne

- 1994 David Byrne
- 2012 Love This Giant

With Thomas Chapin

- 1992 Insomnia
- 1999 Alive

With Dave Douglas

- Mountain Passages (Greenleaf, 2005)
- Spirit Moves (Greenleaf, 2009)
- United Front: Brass Ecstasy at Newport (Greenleaf, 2011)
- Rare Metal (Greenleaf, 2011)

With Spanish Fly

- 1994 Rags to Britches
- 1996 Fly by Night

With Sting

- 2009 If on a Winter's Night...
- 2010 Symphonicities
- 2013 The Last Ship

With They Might Be Giants

- 2004 Indestructible Object
- 2011 Album Raises New And Troubling Questions

With Henry Threadgill

- Too Much Sugar for a Dime (Axiom, 1993)
- Carry the Day (Columbia, 1994)
- Makin' a Move (Columbia, 1995)

With Loudon Wainwright III

- 2009 High Wide & Handsome: The Charlie Poole Project
- 2012 Older Than My Old Man Now

With Victor Wooten

- 2012 Sword & Stone
- 2012 Words & Tones

With John Zorn

- 1992 John Zorn's Cobra: Live at the Knitting Factory
- 2002 Cobra: John Zorn's Game Pieces Volume 2
- 2011 The Satyr's Play / Cerberus

With others

- 1987 No Dummies Allowed, Charlie Persip
- 1991 Spirit of Nuff...Nuff, Very Very Circus
- 1996 Mundo Civilizado, Arto Lindsay
- 1996 Gravity!!!, Howard Johnson and Gravity
- 1999 Hold the Elevator, Orange Then Blue
- 2000 Muy Divertido!, Marc Ribot
- 2001 Songs I Heard, Harry Connick Jr.
- 2003 Alegría, Wayne Shorter
- 2004 Lake Biwa, Wadada Leo Smith
- 2004 While the Music Lasts, Jesse Harris
- 2008 Yo-Yo Ma & Friends: Songs of Joy & Peace, Yo-Yo Ma
- 2009 Arrow, Clare & the Reasons
- 2009 Declaration, Donny McCaslin
- 2009 Tattoos & Mushrooms, Steven Bernstein
- 2009 Trombone Tribe, Roswell Rudd
- 2010 Girls Need Attention, Richard Julian
- 2010 Heavy Dreaming, Ryan Keberle
- 2011 The Gaddabouts, The Gaddabouts
- 2012 Manhattan Jazz Orchestra Plays Disney, Manhattan Jazz Orchestra
- 2016 Stranger to Stranger, Paul Simon
