= Charms of the Night Sky =

Studio album by Dave Douglas
- Released: 1998
- Recorded: September 18–19, 1997
- Genre: Jazz
- Length: 64:36
- Label: Winter & Winter
- Producer: Dave Douglas, Stefan Winter, and Joe Ferla

Dave Douglas chronology
Moving Portrait (1998)	Charms of the Night Sky (1998)	Magic Triangle (1999)

Charms of the Night Sky is the tenth album by the trumpeter Dave Douglas. It was released on the German Winter & Winter label in 1998 and contains performances by Douglas, Greg Cohen, Mark Feldman and Guy Klucevsek.

== Reception ==
Professional ratings
Review scores
Source	Rating
AllMusic	4.5/5 stars
The Penguin Guide to Jazz Recordings	4/4 stars

The AllMusic review by Steve Loewy stated: "Trumpeter Dave Douglas has participated in so many styles of music that listing them all would be mesmerizing. Some of his best work has been performed in free style and hard bop jazz groups. Here, he charts a different path, albeit one that he has pursued successfully before, in a mellow, lovely vein".

== Track listing ==
All compositions by Dave Douglas except as indicated

1. "Charms Of The Night Sky" - 7:32
2. "Bal Masque" - 3:48
3. "Sea Change" - 5:18
4. "Facing West" - 4:23
5. "Dance In Thy Soul (for Charlie Haden)" - 8:07
6. "Little One" (Hancock) - 4:11
7. "Wild Coffee" (Klucevsek) - 1:14
8. "The Girl With The Rose Hips" (Klucevsek) - 2:51
9. "Decafinata" (Klucevsek) - 2:27
10. "Poveri Fiori" (Cilea) - 2:41
11. "Odyssey" - 6:28
12. "Twisted" - 3:37
13. "Codetta" - 2:53
- Recorded at Avatar Studios, New York City on September 18 and 19, 1997

== Personnel ==
- Dave Douglas: trumpet
- Mark Feldman: violin
- Guy Klucevsek: accordion
- Greg Cohen: acoustic bass
