= Be Still (Dave Douglas album) =

Studio album by Dave Douglas Quintet
- Released: September 25, 2012
- Recorded: April 15 & 16, 2012
- Studio: Avatar (New York, New York)
- Genre: Jazz
- Length: 42:53
- Label: Greenleaf Music
- Producer: Dave Douglas

Dave Douglas chronology
GPS, V3: Bad Mango (2011)	Be Still (2012)	Time Travel (2013)

Be Still is an album by Dave Douglas' who is a prolific trumpeter, composer, and educator from New York City. He is a part of quintet with guest vocalist and guitarist Aoife O'Donovan. The album was released in September 2012 on the Greenleaf Music label. It was released in response to the loss of his mother.

== Reception ==
Professional ratings
Review scores
Source	Rating
AllMusic	4/5 stars
All About Jazz	4/5 stars
PopMatters	9/10

Thom Jurek for AllMusic states, "Be Still is brimming with poetic elegance; but it is also adventurous in its graceful articulation of folk forms (jazz is one of them, after all), and possesses a creativity and musical sophistication that is above all, revelatory". Writing for All About Jazz, Glenn Astarita said "Be Still is a significant entry into Douglas's hefty and multifarious discography. It's a beautiful production, brimming with memorable pieces that sustain recurring listens. Figuratively speaking, the program may be analogous to an elegantly wrapped gift waiting to be opened". PopMatters' Will Layman stated "With Be Still, Dave Douglas seems to be standing both smack in the middle of American art—jazz, sure, but so much else as well—and slightly apart from it. He’s seeing connections and beauty where others might not. He’s making something that is mysterious but also ought to touch any listener who dares beyond the Top 40. It’s a great, great record".

== Track listing ==
1. "Be Still My Soul" (Catharina von Schlegel, Jean Sibelius) - 5:01
2. "High On a Mountain" (Ola Belle Reed) - 2:37
3. "God Be with You" (Jeremiah Rankin, William G. Tomer) - 5:00
4. "Barbara Allen" (Traditional) - 4:22
5. "This Is My Father's World" (Maltbie Davenport Babcock) - 3:43
6. "Going Somewhere with You" (Dave Douglas) - 5:23
7. "Middle March" (Douglas) - 5:46
8. "Living Streams" (Traditional) - 5:02
9. "Whither Must I Wander?" (Ralph Vaughan Williams) - 5:59

== Personnel ==
- Dave Douglas - trumpet
- Aoife O'Donovan – guitar, vocals
- Jon Irabagon - tenor saxophone
- Matt Mitchell - piano
- Linda Oh - bass
- Rudy Royston - drums
