= Greenleaf Music =

American jazz record label

- Founded: 2005
- Founder: Dave Douglas
- Genre: Jazz
- Country of origin: U.S.
- Location: Croton-on-Hudson, New York
- Official website: www.greenleafmusic.com

Greenleaf Music is an independent music company directed by American trumpeter and composer Dave Douglas. In addition to recordings on CD, vinyl, and digital formats, Greenleaf Music houses sheet music and podcasts, as well as supporting tours by its community of artists.

Founded in 2005 by Douglas and Mike Friedman (of Premonition Records), Greenleaf Music has released albums by Dave Douglas, Donny McCaslin, Nicole Mitchell, Harrison Bankhead, Hamid Drake, Kneebody, Michael Bates, Curtis Robert Macdonald, Linda May Han Oh, Matt Ulery, Ryan Keberle, Rudy Royston, Greg Ward and Mareike Wiening. The Greenleaf Music podcast, A Noise From The Deep, has produced over 70 episodes.

The label operates in New York and is distributed by Redeye Worldwide. Greenleaf Music also has an independent subscription store through the Bandcamp platform.

== Discography ==
- Curtis Robert Macdonald – Community Immunity, 2011
- Dave Douglas & Brass Ecstasy – Spirit Moves, 2009
- Dave Douglas & Keystone – Keystone, 2006; Keystone: Live at Jazz Standard, 2008; Keystone: Live in Sweden, 2007; Spark of Being, 2010
- Dave Douglas and Uri Caine – Present Joys, 2014
- Dave Douglas Quintet – Live at the Bimhuis Set 1 & 2, 2006; Live at the Jazz Standard (Complete Book), 2006; Live at the Jazz Standard, 2007; Meaning and Mystery, 2006
- Dave Douglas – Be Still, 2012; A Single Sky, 2009; GPS, V1: Rare Metals, 2011; GPS, V2: Orange Afternoons, 2011; GPS, V3: Bad Mango, 2011; Magic Triangle/Leap of Faith [2-CD Reissue], 2012; Mountain Passages, 2005; Time Travel, 2013; United Front: Brass Ecstasy at Newport, 2011; High Risk, 2015; Dark Territory, (2016)
- Donny McCaslin – Recommended Tools, 2008; Perpetual Motion, 2011; Casting for Gravity, 2012
- Kneebody – Self-titled, 2005
- Linda May Han Oh – Initial Here, 2012
- Matt Ulery – Wake an Echo, 2013; By a Little Light, 2012
- Michael Bates' Outside Sources – Clockwise, 2008; Live in New York, 2009
- Nicole Mitchell / Harrison Bankhead / Hamid Drake – Indigo Trio: Live in Montreal, 2007
- Nels Cline & Norton Wisdom – Stained Radiance [DVD], 2010
