= Dave Douglas (trumpeter) =

American jazz trumpeter, composer, and educator

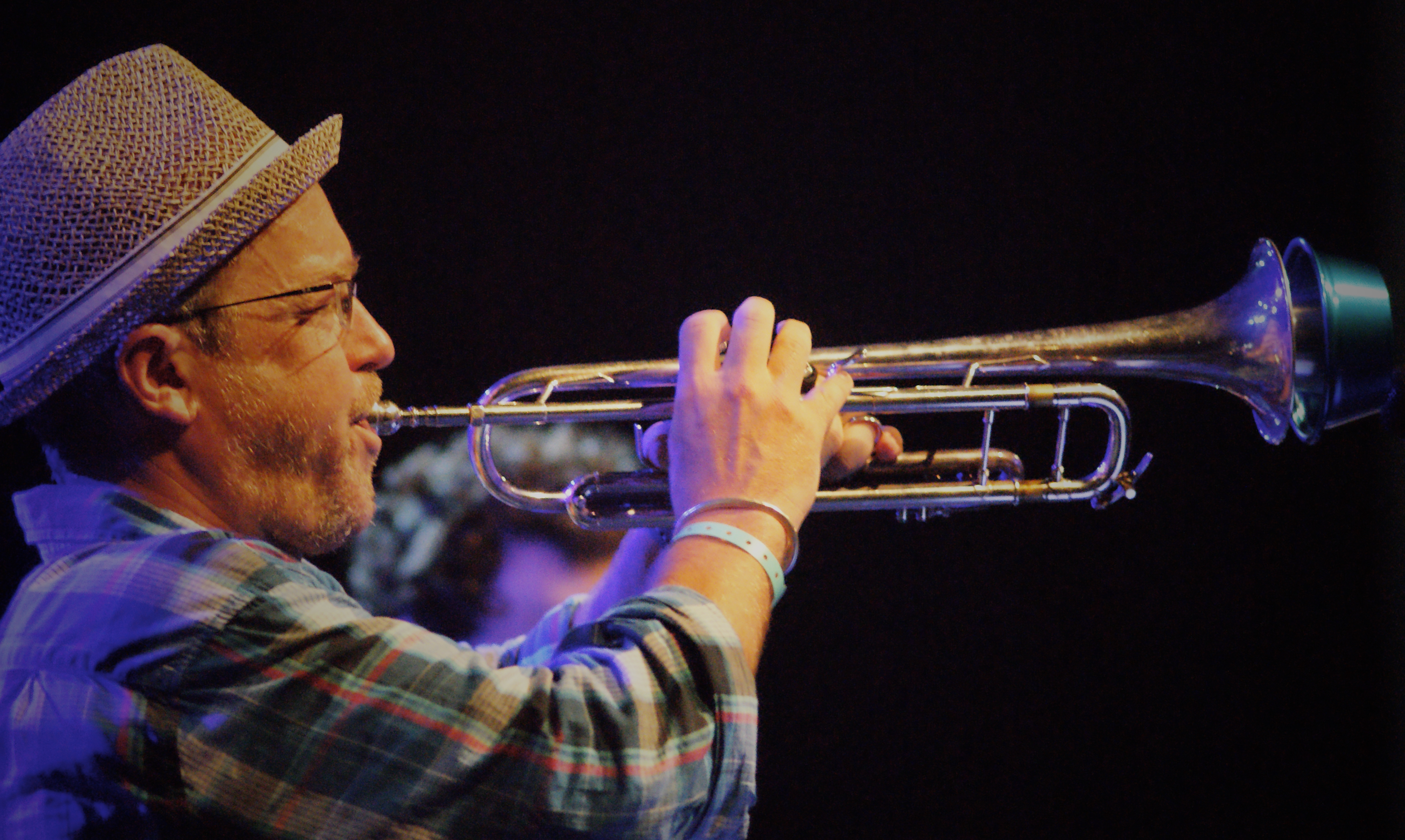
- Douglas in 2011 at North Sea Jazz Festival

Background information
- Born: March 24, 1963 (age 63); Montclair, New Jersey, U.S.
- Genres: Jazz, free jazz, electronic
- Occupations: Musician, composer, bandleader
- Instruments: Trumpet, cornet
- Years active: 1984–present
- Labels: Greenleaf, RCA, Winter & Winter, Arabesque, Soul Note
- Website: davedouglas.com

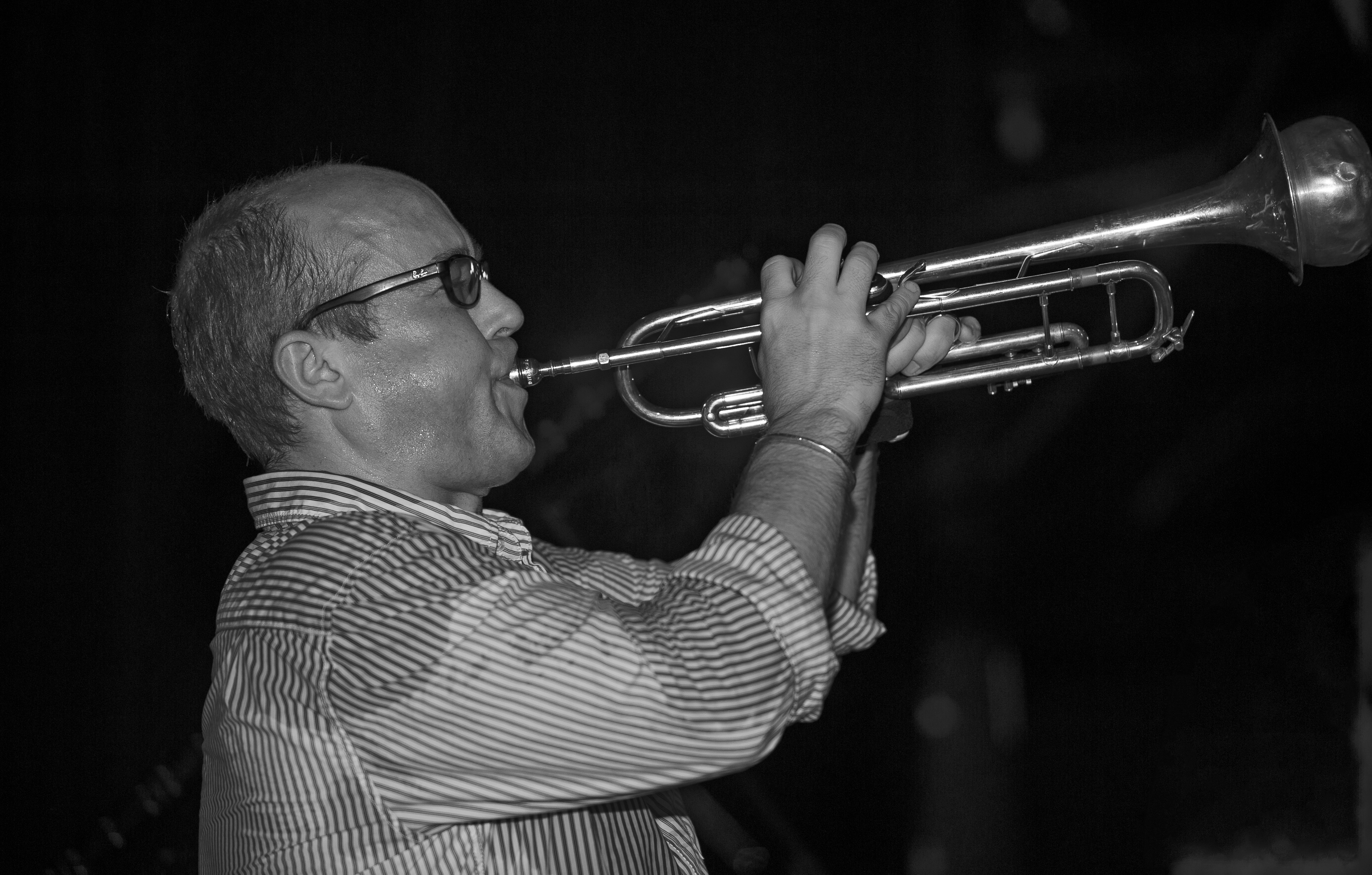
Dave Douglas, Vision XIII Festival

Dave Douglas (born March 24, 1963) is an American jazz trumpeter, composer, and educator. His career includes more than ninety recordings as a leader and more than 500 published compositions. His ensembles include the Dave Douglas Quintet; Sound Prints, a quintet co-led with saxophonist Joe Lovano; Uplift, a sextet with bassist Bill Laswell; Present Joys with pianist Uri Caine and Andrew Cyrille; High Risk, an electronic ensemble with Shigeto, Jonathan Aaron, and Ian Chang; ENGAGE, a sextet with Jeff Parker, Tomeka Reid, Anna Webber, Nick Dunston, and Kate Gentile; Alloy, a sextet with trumpeters Alexandra Ridout and Dave Adewumi, and GIFTS Quintet with James Brandon Lewis, Tomeka Reid, Rafiq Bhatia and Ian Chang.

He has won a Doris Duke Performing Artist Award, a Guggenheim Fellowship, an Aaron Copland award, and received Grammy Award nominations. As a composer, Douglas has received commissions from the Trisha Brown Dance Company, Birmingham Contemporary Music Group, Norddeutscher Rundfunk, Essen Philharmonie, The Library of Congress, Stanford University and Monash Art Ensemble, which premiered his chamber orchestra piece Fabliaux in March 2014.

From 2002 to 2012, he served as artistic director of the Workshop in Jazz and Creative Music at the Banff Centre in Canada. He is a co-founder of the Festival of New Trumpet Music in New York with trumpeter Roy Campbell Jr. Since 2003, Douglas has served as director of the nonprofit festival. He is on the faculty at the Mannes School of Music and is a guest coach for the Juilliard Jazz Composer's Ensemble. In 2016, he accepted a four-year appointment as the artistic director of the Bergamo Jazz Festival. In 2025, Douglas began a two-year residency with the Malmö Academy of Music in Sweden.

In 2005 Douglas founded Greenleaf Music, a record label for his albums, sheet music, podcasts, as well as the music of other modern jazz musicians. Greenleaf has produced over 100 albums.

== Early life ==
Born in Montclair, New Jersey, Douglas grew up in the New York City area and attended Phillips Exeter Academy, a private high school in New Hampshire. He was introduced to jazz by his father, Damon Greenleaf Douglas Jr., and as a young teen was shown jazz theory and harmony by the pianist Tommy Gallant. Douglas began performing jazz during his junior year in high school while on an abroad program in Barcelona, Spain. After graduating from high school in 1981, he studied at the Berklee College of Music and New England Conservatory, both located in Boston, Massachusetts.

== Career ==
=== 1980s ===
In 1984, Douglas moved to New York to study at New York University, to study directly with Carmine Caruso, and he finished a degree in music. Early gigs included the experimental rock band Dr. Nerve, Jack McDuff, Vincent Herring as well as street bands around New York City. He played with a variety of ensembles and came to the attention of the jazz pianist, composer, and bandleader, Horace Silver, with whom he toured the US and Europe in 1987.

In the late 1980s, Douglas began playing with bands led by Don Byron, Tim Berne, Marty Ehrlich, Walter Thompson, and others in New York. He played in the composer collectives Mosaic Sextet. He also toured with theater companies including the world-renowned Bread and Puppet Theater and the Swiss ensemble Les Montreurs d'images.

=== 1990s ===
From 1989 to 1996 Douglas played in the quintet New and Used with whom he recorded two albums. In March 1993, Douglas got the opportunity to record his first album as a leader, Parallel Worlds (Black Saint/Soul Note), which featured his String Group with Mark Feldman (violin), Erik Friedlander (cello), Mark Dresser (bass), Michael Sarin (drums). The album is a collection of original pieces, some using serial composition techniques, and arrangements of Webern, Ellington, Kurt Weill and Stravinsky.

This first recording was followed in quick succession by the debuts of two groups, the Tiny Bell Trio (Songlines) with Brad Shepik and Jim Black and The Dave Douglas Sextet, with Chris Speed, Josh Roseman, Uri Caine, James Genus and Joey Baron, which recorded an homage to Booker Little called In Our Lifetime (New World).

This began a period during which Douglas recorded widely as a side musician and as a member of many new jazz groups. Douglas also began touring extensively worldwide both as a leader and as a side musician.

In 1993, Douglas also began performing with John Zorn in his Masada quartet, with Greg Cohen and Joey Baron. The group, which still occasionally performs, deals with Jewish and diaspora culture and heritage through Zorn's original compositions. As such, it is an amalgam of jazz, new music, klezmer, and purely improvised styles. The band became one of Zorn's most long-standing and popular ensembles, and brought Douglas wider attention.

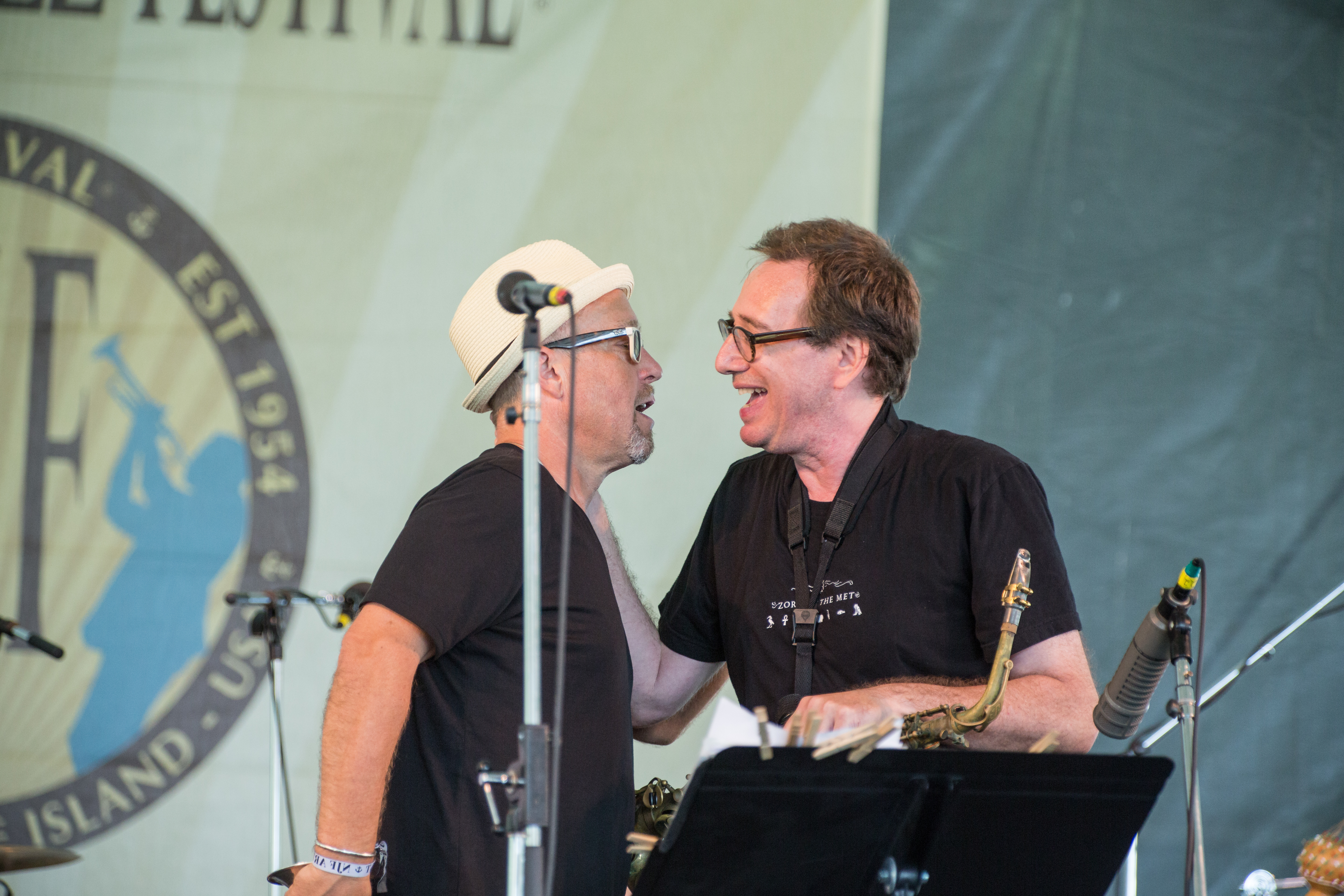
Masada in concert

Since the mid-1990s, Douglas has led a variety of groups simultaneously. In 1996, Douglas recorded Sanctuary with Cuong Vu, Anthony Coleman, Yuka Honda, Dougie Bowne, and other musicians of the New York downtown scene of the time. The group involved sampling and DJ improvisations in addition to jazz.

In 1997, Douglas started a quartet featuring trumpet, violin, accordion, and bass (with Guy Klucevsek, Mark Feldman, and Greg Cohen) which recorded Charms of the Night Sky, incorporating sounds of Eastern European and Argentinian folk musics as well as jazz influences on the music, which is generally mellow and relaxed. The album included a number of tracks with Douglas and accordionist Guy Klucevsek performing as a duo. A second album by the Charms of the Night Sky group, A Thousand Evenings was released in 2000.

Also in 1997, Douglas founded a jazz quartet with Chris Potter, James Genus, and Ben Perowsky. This group recorded two albums in this period, Magic Triangle and Leap of Faith. Both were originally released by Arabesque Recordings, and have subsequently been reissued on Douglas's own imprint, Greenleaf Music. Greenleaf has also released sheet music containing all of the original compositions from these albums. This group further explored Douglas's interest in writing harmony for cordless groups and lyrical, accessible new acoustic jazz sounds.

Towards the end of the 1990s, Douglas formed a Quintet with Uri Caine on fender rhodes, Chris Potter, James Genus and drummer Clarence Penn. The formation of this group coincided with Douglas signing a seven-record deal with major label RCA Victor.

Douglas also began to appear at the mainstream jazz clubs around New York such as Iridium, Village Vanguard and Jazz Standard. His international touring continued with multiway residencies of his original works at festivals in Belgium, Italy, Poland, Germany, France and Spain.

It was at the end of the 1990s that Douglas first visited the Banff Centre for the Arts as a visiting artist, at the invitation of pianist Kenny Werner. A few year later he would begin a ten-year stint as the Director of the Banff International Workshop in Jazz and Creative Music.

=== 2000s ===
In 2000, Douglas released Soul on Soul, a tribute to composer and pianist Mary Lou Williams, featuring original arrangements of her music for the sextet and new pieces inspired by her work. Douglas also released albums featuring Charms of the Night Sky and the Dave Douglas Quartet in the same year.

In the early years of the decade, Douglas worked often with the Trisha Brown Dance Company. El Trilogy, an extended musical work accompanying modern dance, was performed during 2000–2001.

Witness, a nine-part suite, was released in 2001. It features a band made up of trumpet, sax, two electric pianos, electronic percussion, bass, and drums. Douglas' music had always been informed by his political concerns, but this album was his most ambitious attempt to give them musical form, often by celebrating his political and cultural heroes through dedications and track titles. The album includes a 20-minute track entitled "Mahfouz", in which gravel-voiced singer Tom Waits reads an excerpt from the works of Egyptian writer Naguib Mahfouz, as well as pieces dedicated to Edward Said and Taslima Nasrin.

More recently, Douglas founded the Dave Douglas New Quintet and Nomad. The Quintet is a trumpet and tenor sax-led group but with Fender Rhodes electric piano. Their first album, The Infinite (2001), featured Douglas originals and pieces by or inspired by musicians Rufus Wainwright, Björk and Thom Yorke. This was followed up by 2004's Strange Liberation by the same group with guest Bill Frisell on guitar. Formed in 2003, Nomad is made up of trumpet, clarinet, cello, tuba, and drums. With this band, Douglas performed his suite Mountain Passages, commissioned for the Italian Sound of the Dolomites Festival, and released as the first album on Douglas' record label Greenleaf Music in 2005. The suite features a variety of different influences including Italian Ladino music, New Orleans jazz, and other musics, and is to be played from 9 to 12,000 feet above sea level.

Douglas also started a new band called Keystone, which performs works influenced by the silent film actor and director Roscoe "Fatty" Arbuckle. The project includes pieces to be performed with Arbuckle's films. This ensemble is made up of trumpet, tenor sax, Wurlitzer (electric piano), turntables, electric bass, and drums. A CD of this music – accompanied by a DVD with two Arbuckle shorts – was released in 2005.

2006 saw Douglas release Meaning and Mystery, where he plays again with his quintet, now with Donny McCaslin in place of Chris Potter on saxophones. In December 2006, Greenleaf Music recorded all the quintet's performances over a six-night engagement at New York's Jazz Standard jazz club, called them Live at the Jazz Standard, and made the two-hour sets the band played each night available for download from the company's website within 24 hours. The 44 compositions, almost all of them by Douglas alongside covers of Wainwright, Mary J. Blige and Björk, featured 14 tunes not previously recorded by the band. Those 14 new compositions were released on a 2-CD set, Live at the Jazz Standard, in 2007.

In late 2007, Moonshine, a further recording by Keystone, was released. This was based upon recordings made of a concert performance by the band at that year's Bray Jazz Festival in Ireland. The Keystone band then led a 5-night run at Jazz Standard in April 2008. Greenleaf Music recorded and released all ten sets through their website as a download-only series, Keystone: Live at Jazz Standard (Complete Book).

In 2009, Douglas released two albums: Spirit Moves by his Brass Ecstasy band which featured Vincent Chancey, Luis Bonilla, Marcus Rojas and Nasheet Waits; and his first album of big band compositions, A Single Sky, a collaboration with Jim McNeely and the Frankfurt Radio Bigband.

=== 2010s ===
In tandem with the 100th anniversary of the first Frankenstein film, Douglas collaborated with experimental film-maker Bill Morrison and released the 3-CD set Spark of Being. Written for his Keystone ensemble, the set includes three related, yet subtly different, albums to accompany the Morrison film. The first edition, entitled Soundtrack, comprises long-form pieces edited to accompany the film in real time. The second edition, Expand, contains extended performances of the original themes from the soundtrack, arranged in a traditional jazz album format. Burst, the third edition, consists of additional variations and unused outtakes recorded at the initial session.

In 2011, Douglas released three albums within the span of five months through Greenleaf Music. The albums were released only in digital format and contained approximately 30 to 50 minutes of music per album, referencing album lengths of the LP era. Released under the unifying label of the Greenleaf Portable Series, or GPS, the albums showcased ensembles that Douglas may only "rarely get to play with" in some cases. The first album, Rare Metals featured Douglas' Brass Ecstasy ensemble. The second album, Orange Afternoons included Ravi Coltrane on tenor sax, Vijay Iyer on piano, Linda Oh on bass, Marcus Gilmore on drums. The third, Bad Mango, paired Douglas with the innovative quartet So Percussion.

After the bandleaders' intersecting tenures in the SFJAZZ Collective in 2008, Douglas joined with tenor saxophonist Joe Lovano to form the co-led quintet Sound Prints with drummer Joey Baron, bassist Linda Oh and pianist Lawrence Fields. Inspired by the music of tenor saxophonist Wayne Shorter the group debuted at New York's Village Vanguard in November 2012. In 2013 the Monterey Jazz Festival commissioned Wayne Shorter to write two pieces for the group. Sound Prints premiered "Unknown” and “To Sail Beyond The Sunset” at the festival that year. The concert resulted in Live at Monterey Jazz Festival on Blue Note Records in 2015. The group's second album Scandal, was released in 2018 on Greenleaf Music and it marked the first time the pair has recorded a full studio album of material together. The album boasts ten originals by Lovano and Douglas as well as treatments of two Shorter classics. Two tracks from the same recording session were released on a 7” 45 on green vinyl: On Pebble Street was a special release for Record Store Day in April 2018. The quintet released their third album of original compositions, Other Worlds, in May 2021. The CD artwork features space-inspired artwork by celebrated visual artist Dave Chisholm. Other Worlds was later released as a double vinyl LP for Record Store Day Black Friday on November 25, 2022.

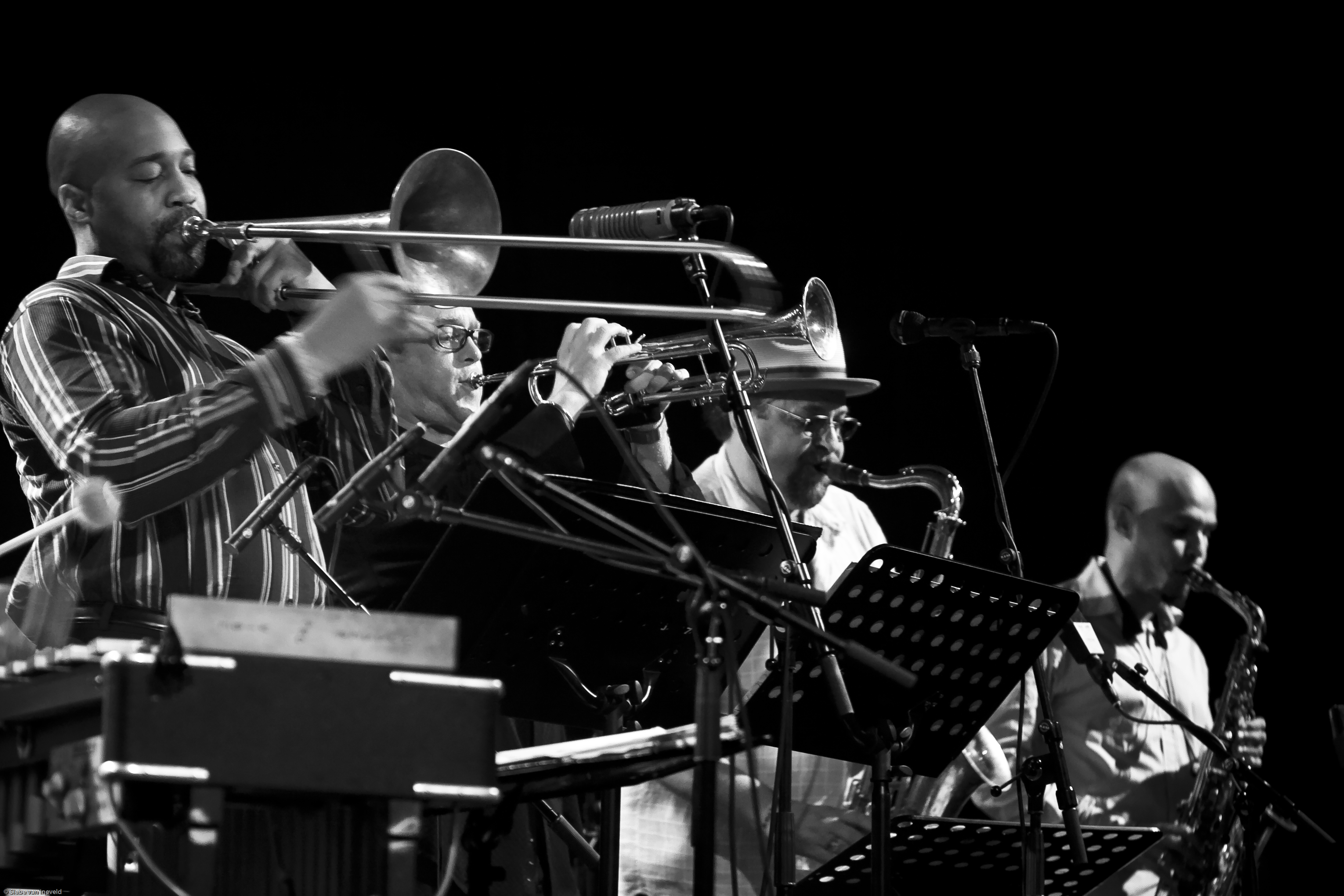
SFJAZZ Collective

Douglas released Be Still in 2012. The album featured Douglas' newly formed quintet of Jon Irabagon on saxophone, Matt Mitchell on piano, Linda Oh on bass, and Rudy Royston on drums with the addition of vocalist Aoife O'Donovan. Dedicated to the memory of Douglas' mother, Emily, who died in 2011, Be Still features nine tracks, of which six are hymns and folks songs that she requested Douglas perform at her funeral. The same ensemble, minus O'Donovan, recorded and released Time Travel the following year.

Inspired by 2005's Mountain Passages, which the I Suoni delle Dolomiti festival in Northern Italy commissioned to be performed at a high altitude, Douglas initiated his 2013 tenure as the Monterey Jazz Festival's "Showcase Artist" with a benefit concert and hike at Glen Deven Ranch in Big Sur, California. The audience and performers alike hiked to a promontory overlooking the Pacific Ocean and then listened to a concert of Douglas' music.

In celebration of his 50th birthday, Douglas launched his "50 States Project" and set out to perform in each of the 50 U.S. states throughout the course of 2013. The tour aimed to include performances in "unlikely and outdoors locations for people who might not otherwise have the same kind of access to live, improvised music as those in larger cities." The tour also coincided with the release of ‘DD|50: Special Edition 50th Birthday Recordings’ a special box set that included three CDs (Pathways, Time Travel, and Be Still) and a DVD containing previously unreleased in-studio performances and art videos shot by Christoph Green.

Douglas formed the collective ensemble Riverside in collaboration with tenor saxophonist Chet Doxas, electric bassist Steve Swallow and drummer Jim Doxas out of a shared respect for Texas-born multireedist Jimmy Giuffre. The group's eponymously titled recording features originals by Douglas and Doxas, as well as Giuffre's "The Train and the River". The group's sophomore album The New National Anthem was released in May 2017 featuring the pianist and composer Carla Bley. The album features three compositions by Bley, as well as songs by Douglas, Swallow and Doxas. The group played a number of concerts and festivals in the summer and fall of 2017 with Bley as a special guest, including two concerts in Quebec and a ten-date tour of Europe

In July 2014, Douglas released a duo project Present Joys with his long-time collaborator, pianist Uri Caine. The two explore the music of the Sacred Harp tradition, taking on four pieces from the shape-note tune books as well as several new Douglas compositions undertaken in the same vein. The duo expanded with the addition of drummer Andrew Cyrille. The trio released Devotion in 2019, performing Douglas compositions inspired by Franco D’Andrea, Carla Bley, Mary Lou Williams, and Dizzy Gillespie.

The Monash Art Ensemble (MAE) is a collaboration between the Sir Zelman Cowen School of Music at Monash University in Melbourne, Australia, and the Australian Art Orchestra (AAO), an improvising chamber orchestra including some of Melbourne's finest players also affiliated with Monash University. In 2014, Dave composed a set of music drawing inspiration from composers of the early 14th century French Ars Nova, most notably Guillaume De Machaut. Scored for four winds, four brass, four strings, and four percussion, including electronics, the music explores ideas of hocket, isorhythm, and modal counterpoint as points of departure, mixing improvisation with timbre and structure in unexpected ways. The resulting album, Fabliaux, was released in 2015 on Greenleaf Music in collaboration with Australian label JazzHead.

Dave first met DJ, producer and beatmaker Shigeto (Ghostly International) at a Red Bull Music Academy event that paired musicians in a series of solo and duet improvisations, and the two found some common creative ground. Following that collaboration, Douglas formed an electronic ensemble to probe the possibilities of improvised jazz and electronic music. Adding Jonathan Maron on electric and acoustic bass and Mark Guiliana on electric and acoustic drums, as well as engineer Geoff Countryman - whose knowledge and skills as a musician and technician helped piece everything together – the group released High Risk in 2015. The group's follow up album, Dark Territory, was released on LP as a Record Store Day 2016 Exclusive.

In the fall of 2015, Dave released Brazen Heart, an album featuring his longstanding quintet with Jon Irabagon, Matt Mitchell, Linda May Han Oh, and Rudy Royston. The title track was commissioned for the Ecstatic Music Festival as a piece for large brass ensemble to be performed at the World Trade Center site in lower Manhattan, reimagined for a small group. Following a North American tour, the quintet played a week of shows at the Jazz Standard in November 2015. Recorded on the fly, each night's music was released the next day for digital download on Bandcamp, allowing fans to hear the music with a remarkable turnaround. The complete set of music – four nights, eight sets, eighty-four tracks in total – was released as Brazen Heart Live, an 8-CD box set. PopMatters compared the release to Miles Davis’ The Complete Live at the Plugged Nickel 1965 sessions.

In 2016, Douglas joined with French pianist Frank Woeste, bassist Matt Brewer and drummer Clarence Penn to produce a cooperative album with support from the French-American Jazz Exchange. Dada People was inspired by the Dada art movement and the work of Man Ray and his circle of artists.

Douglas composed a series of twelve short compositions, each named for an Italian month of the year entitled New Sanctuary. The 2016 work touches on his compositional process from 1996'sSanctuary. It challenges the performers to maximally tease out the implications of each idea, using their own personal vocabulary to develop and explore the music in fresh ways every time. Douglas recorded the music in a new trio with guitarist Marc Ribot and percussionist Susie Ibarra.

In 2017, Douglas released Little Giant Still Life, featuring the brass quartet, The Westerlies. After encountering the group at Seattle's Earshot Jazz Festival, Douglas began writing music for group of ensemble improvisors, later adding drummer Anwar Marshall. Much of the music is inspired by the American painter Stuart Davis.

Douglas’ 2018 Subscriber Series is entitled, UPLIFT. Subtitled, “Twelve Pieces For Positive Action,” the music was conceived by Douglas as a response to the tumultuous political and social climate of the United States and beyond. Featuring twelve new Douglas compositions for a new sextet, each piece highlights a specific social cause and references organizations doing important work. The ensemble, which came together to record the music in December 2017, features saxophonist Joe Lovano, guitarists Mary Halvorson and Julian Lage, bassist Bill Laswell and drummer Ian Chang. Throughout 2018, a new track was released each month exclusively for subscribers with a CD coming out in December 2018. A descendant of UPLIFT, Douglas recorded a program of brand new compositions – ENGAGE - as reactions and ruminations on hope and positivity. Douglas sought out specific improvisers and collaborators from different generations and backgrounds to deal with music that inspires, challenges and stirs to action. The songs were specifically built for this collaborative and dynamic ensemble including woodwind player Anna Webber, cellist Tomeka Reid, guitarist Jeff Parker, bassist Nick Dunston and drummer Kate Gentile. On some of the pieces, the ensemble is joined by trumpeters Dave Adewumi and Riley Mulherkar. The twelve pieces are built using the compositional rule of major triads, with each of the twelve pieces in the “song cycle” approaching these triads in a different way. The pieces were released monthly during 2019 to Greenleaf Music subscribers, and a culminating CD was released in December 2019.

=== 2020-present ===
To honor the legacy of the great trumpeter, composer and humanist Dizzy Gillespie, Douglas wanted to explore Dizzy's experimental and wide open mind as well as the influence of his music. The project started out as a concert program, assembled for a performance presented by Jazz at Lincoln Center in February, 2018. For that, Douglas assembled a sextet that included Ambrose Akinmusire on trumpet, guitarist Bill Frisell, pianist Gerald Clayton, bassist Linda May Han Oh and Joey Baron on drums. Douglas began to conceive of a recorded version of the program, although with a different set of players. In addition to Baron, Douglas brought trumpeter Dave Adewumi, guitarist Matthew Stevens, pianist Fabian Almazan, and bassist Carmen Rothwell into the studio. The resulting album Dizzy Atmosphere: Dizzy Gillespie at Zero Gravity was released in 2020.

Douglas collaborated again with the Monash Art Ensemble in 2020 as a virtual Artist in Residence. Working with a 13-piece ensemble, the musicians workshopped five pieces that Dave composed with inspiration from the Australian writer and poet Kevin Gilbert, along with lyrics contributed by ensemble members. Recording online and remotely, everyone recorded their parts separately and the music was blended together after the fact. The Dream: Monash Sessions was released in digital format in March 2021.

For the 2020 Greenleaf Music Subscriber Series, Douglas recorded a suite entitled, Marching Music. Subtitled Music to March By, Douglas conceived of these pieces as music you could have in your headphones when you attend Climate Marches, Demonstrations for Equal Rights, Voting Rights Movements, and all other actions towards a just society. Featuring a special quartet with guitarist Rafiq Bhatia, bassist Melvin Gibbs and drummer Sim Cain, the ten pieces were released throughout 2020 to subscribers.

On December 4, 2020, Douglas released the album Overcome exclusively to Bandcamp, featuring vocalist Fay Victor, vocalist and guitarist Camila Meza, bassist Jorge Roeder, and drummer Rudy Royston. The album includes a version of “We Shall Overcome”, a gospel song that is best known as a protest song of the American civil rights movement. Having been recorded remotely in first year of the COVID-19 pandemic, it was eventually issued on vinyl and via digital distribution in 2022.

In 2021, Douglas was approached by the Kerrytown Concert House in Ann Arbor to produce an online solo trumpet concert, which was live streamed in December 2021. Using some of that material, plus some additional performances online for Greenleaf subscribers, the album Hudson Solos emerged, all tied to thoughts about the Hudson River. A number of the pieces were released to Greenleaf Music subscribers in 2021 as part of the Subscribers Series and a CD was released in late 2021.

Secular Psalms is a Dave Douglas studio album featuring a newly commissioned suite of ten pieces, inspired by and dedicated to The Adoration of the Mystic Lamb by Jan van Eyck and Hubert van Eyck – a polyptych originally painted for display in St. Bavo's Cathedral in Ghent, Belgium. Commissioned by Handelsbeurs Concert Hall in Gent, Belgium to celebrate the 600th anniversary of the Altarpiece with creation of new music. Drawing on Latin Mass, on early medieval folk songs, on composers of the period, like Guillaume DuFay, and on jazz and improvised music, Douglas and team deliver a lyrical, mystical, spiritual score full of upbeat optimism for our times. Douglas says the title refers to “songs of praise for all of us.” For this project Douglas branched out into new instruments including serpent, lute, organ and sampler, providing a painterly panorama of new sounds, and performed by group of international musicians: Tomeka Reid, Marta Warelis, Berlinde Deman, Frederick Leroux and Lander Gyselinck. The world premiere of the piece took place in Europe in November 2021 with performances in Gent and Brugge Belgium, the Netherlands and Germany. The CD was released by Greenleaf Music in April 2022. The albums and their compositions reference the Song of Ascents, a set of songs from the Book of Psalms.

The Dave Douglas Quintet featuring Irabagon, Mitchell, Oh, and Royston reunited to release its fourth studio album, Songs of Ascent: Book 1 - Degrees on October 7, 2022. The ensemble simultaneously released a second album, Songs of Ascent: Book 2 - Steps directly to subscribers of Greenleaf Music. Douglas recorded all his trumpet parts for both albums first, recording remotely with the musicians from their homes.

In March 2023, Douglas released If There Are Mountains with pianist Elan Mehler, featuring haiku sung by vocalist Dominique Eade. The album had previously been released in 2020 only on vinyl through Mehler's independent label Newvelle Records. The recorded ensemble, a sextet, also includes John Gunther, Simón Willson, and Dayeon Seok.

Douglas’ ensemble GIFTS released its self-titled debut album in 2024 featuring guitarist Rafiq Bhatia, drummer Ian Chang and saxophonist James Brandon Lewis. The album honors Billy Strayhorn, and includes reimaginations of his compositions such as Take the A Train, alongside compositions by Dave Douglas.

Dave Douglas, Rafiq Bhatia and Ian Chang toured Europe in 2023, and their final performance in Katowice, Poland was recorded and released as a subscriber exclusive album: Gifts Trio Live. On April 24, 2026, the ensemble released the album Transcend with the addition of cellist Tomeka Reid. This album paid homage to Duke Ellington, and his Sacred Concerts.

In 2024, Douglas presented a new group at Festival of New Trumpet Music in honor of cofounder Roy Campbell, Jr. The sextet, called Alloy, released a self-titled album in September 2025, and a subsequent album Alloy: Extras directly to subscribers of Greenleaf Music. Alongside Douglas, the ensemble features trumpeters Alexandra Ridout and Dave Adewumi, Vibraphonist Patricia Brennan, Bassist Kate Pass, and Drummer Rudy Royston.

Four Freedoms is an album recorded at Getxo Festival in the Basque Country of Spain, in July 2025. The album features Dave Douglas (trumpet), Marta Warelis (piano), Nick Dunston (bass) and Joey Baron (drums). The quartet recorded a live concert, then reconvened the next day on the same stage to capture versions of the music without an audience. The album is a hybrid of a live album and a studio album, released in January, 2026.

== Personal life ==
Douglas lives in the New York area, lectures regularly at The New School and travels frequently worldwide as a composer and performer. His daughter Mia was born in 1984.

== Discography ==
- Parallel Worlds (1993)
- The Tiny Bell Trio (1994)
- In Our Lifetime (1995)
- Constellations (1995)
- Five (1996)
- Stargazer (1997)
- Moving Portrait (1998)
- Charms of the Night Sky (1998)
- Magic Triangle (1998)
- Convergence (1999)
- Songs for Wandering Souls (1999)
- Soul on Soul (2000)
- Leap of Faith (2000)
- A Thousand Evenings (2000)
- El Trilogy (2001)
- Witness (2001)
- The Infinite (2002)
- Freak In (2003)
- Strange Liberation (2004)
- Bow River Falls (2004)
- Mountain Passages (2005)
- Keystone (2005)
- Meaning and Mystery (2006)
- Spirit Moves (2009)
- A Single Sky (2009)
- Spark of Being (2010)
- Three Views (2011)
- Be Still (2012)
- Time Travel (2013)
- Present Joys [with Uri Caine] (2014)
- High Risk (2015)
- Brazen Heart (2015)
- Dark Territory (2016)
- Brazen Heart Live at Jazz Standard - Saturday (2017)
- Stargazer (2017)
- Brazen Heart Live at Jazz Standard - Friday (2018)
- Brazen Heart Live at Jazz Standard - Thursday (2018)
- Brazen Heart Live at Jazz Standard - Sunday (2018)
- Showing Up / The Power Of The Vote (2019)
- Dizzy Atmosphere (2020)
- Seven Minutes for Kenny (2020)
- Hudson Solos (2021)
- Overcome (2022)
- Secular Psalms (2022)
- Other Worlds (2022)
- Songs of Ascent: Book 1 - Degrees (2022)
- Songs of Ascent: Book 2 - Steps (2022)
- GIFTS (2024)
- Alloy (2025)
- Four Freedoms (2026)
- Transcend (2026)

== Honors and awards ==
Year	Award	Source
2000	Talent Deserving Wider Recognition	Down Beat Critics Poll
2001	Personality of the Festival	International Cork Jazz Festival, Guinness Jazz Festival
2001	Trumpet Player of the Year	Jazz Times Readers Poll
2001	Composer of the Year	Down Beat Critics Poll
2001	Trumpet Player of the Year	Down Beat Critics Poll
2001	Trumpet Player of the Year	Down Beat Readers Poll
2001	Trumpet Player of the Year	Jazz Journalists Association Awards
2001	Musician of the Year	Italian Jazz Critics Society
2002	Trumpet Player of the Year	Jazz Journalists Association Awards
2002	Trumpet Player of the Year	Down Beat Critics Poll
2002	Composer of the Year	Down Beat Critics Poll
2003	Best Instrumental Jazz Album, The Infinite	Grammy Awards (Nominee)
2003	Trumpet Player of the Year	Jazz Journalists Association Awards
2003	Trumpet Player of the Year	Down Beat Critics Poll
2003	Trumpet Player of the Year	Down Beat Readers Poll
2004	Trumpet Player of the Year	Down Beat Critics Poll
2004	Trumpet Player of the Year	Jazz Journalists Association Awards
2005	Guggenheim Fellowship	Guggenheim Foundation
2005	Trumpet Player of the Year	Down Beat Critics Poll
2006	Trumpet Player of the Year	Down Beat Critics Poll
2006	Trumpet Player of the Year	Jazz Journalists Association Awards
2006	Best Contemporary Jazz Album, Keystone	Grammy Awards (Nominee)
2007	Trumpet Player of the Year	Jazz Journalists Association Awards
2007	Trumpet Player of the Year	Down Beat Critics Poll
2008	Trumpet Player of the Year	Down Beat Critics Poll
2009	Trumpet Player of the Year	Down Beat Critics Poll
2011	Trumpet Player of the Year	Down Beat Critics Poll
2013	Trumpet Player of the Year	Down Beat Critics Poll
2016	Doris Duke Artist Award	Doris Duke Foundation
2025	ITG Silver Medal, Gifts	International Trumpet Guild

== Residencies ==
Year	Residency
2010	Stanford Jazz Workshop
2011	University of Miami, Frost School of Music
2012	International Jazz Artist in Residence, Royal Academy of Music, London
2012	University of Miami, Frost School of Music
2013	Indiana University, Bloomington
2013	University of Washington, Seattle
2013	International Jazz Artist in Residence, Royal Academy of Music, London
2014	SUNY Oswego
2014	University of Oregon
2014	Monash University, Melbourne, Australia, Sir Zelman Cowen School of Music (Distinguished Scholar in Jazz)
2014	University of Colorado, Boulder
2015	Jalisco Jazz Festival, Guadalajara, Mexico
2015	Berklee College of Music, Berklee Global Jazz Institute
2015	Columbia College, Chicago
2016	New York Masters International Jazz Workshop, Wroclaw, Poland
2016	Utah State University
2017	Sienna Jazz Workshop
2017	Milan Conservatory
2017	Jazz te Gast, Amsterdam
2017	Malmö Academy of Music, Malmö, Sweden
2018	Middle Tennessee State University
2018	New England Conservatory
2018	Sacramento State University, Festival of the Arts
2018	Banff Centre for Arts and Creativity
2018	Royal Academy of Music, London, UK
2019	Summer Jazz Improv Workshop, New York University,
2020	Monash University, Sir Zelman Cowen School of Music, Melbourne, Australia
2020	Oscar Peterson Artist-in-Residence, York University
2022	College-Conservatory of Music, University of Cincinnati
2023	Guildhall School of Music, London, UK

== Workshops and masterclasses ==
Year	Residency
2013	University of Wyoming
2013	University of Louisville
2014	Purchase College
2014	University of Alabama
2014	University of Nevada
2014	University of Kansas
2015	Litchfield Jazz Camp
2015	Purdue University
2015	University of Northern Iowa
2015	Manhattan School of Music
2016	Festival Place au Jazz, Antony, France
2016	Seattle JazzED
2016	University of California, Davis
2016	University of New Hampshire
2017	Straight Ahead Jazz Camp, Chicago
2017	Cuesta College
2017	University of Michigan
2017	University of Mary, Bismark, North Dakota
2018	Art Up Art Festival, Milan, Italy
2018	Sacramento State Festival of the Arts
2019	Georgetown University
2019	Barga Jazz Festival, Bara, Italy
2020	Ball State University
2021	Merano Italy Jazz Fest Masterclass
2022	Cincinnati Symphony Orchestra
2023	Masterclass @ Club Telex, Gent
2024	Langnau Jazz Workshop
2024	Stanford Jazz Workshop
2025	Malmo Academy of Music, Sweden
