= List of hurdy-gurdy musicians =

This is a list of musicians notable for playing the hurdy-gurdy.

== List ==
- Leo Abrahams
- Alestorm
- Andrey Vinogradov
- Ritchie Blackmore
- Nordman
- Blowzabella
- Grégory Jolivet ex Blowzabella
- Mykola Budnyk
- Ethel Cain
- Dorothy Carter
- George Cassidy
- Régine Chassagne
- Valentin Clastrier
- Gaia Consort
- Rémy Couvez
- Cellar Darling
- Jean-François Dutertre
- Nigel Eaton
- Peter Pringle
- Eluveitie
- In Extremo
- Faun
- Jem Finer
- Geologist
- Ben Grossman
- Patty Gurdy
- Buzzo McCowling
- Keiji Haino
- Andy Irvine
- Ithilien
- Jonne Järvelä
- The Kelly Family
- Anna Katharina Kränzlein
- Michalina Malisz
- Bear McCreary
- Efrim Menuck
- Anna Murphy
- Anton Newcombe
- Candice Night
- Omnia
- Jimmy Page
- Emmanuelle Parrenin
- Dominique Regef
- Saltatio Mortis
- Stam1na
- Gordiy Starukh
- Storm Seeker
- Subway to Sally
- Richard Thompson
- Sébastien Tron
- Stevie Wishart
- Guilhem Desq
