= In the Night =

In the Night may refer to:

== Music ==
- In the Night Tour, a concert tour by Kelly Key
- In the Night, a video by Mustasch, 2008

=== Albums ===
- In the Night (Charley Crockett album) or the title song, 2016
- In the Night (Cheryl Lynn album) or the title song, 1981
- In the Night (Dream Evil album) or the title song, 2010
- In the Night (George Shearing and Dakota Staton album), 1958

=== Songs ===
- "In the Night" (The Weeknd song), 2015
- In the Night (Beck song), 2026
- "In the Night", by Autograph from Sign In Please, 1984
- "In the Night", by Blackfoot from Tomcattin', 1980
- "In the Night", by Capital Sound, 1994
- "In the Night", by Childish Gambino from Bando Stone & the New World, 2024
- "In the Night", by Norman Mapp
- "In the Night", by the Pet Shop Boys from the single "Opportunities (Let's Make Lots of Money)", 1985
- "In the Night", by Phinehas from The Fire Itself, 2021
- "In the Night", by Rock Goddess from Hell Hath No Fury, 1983

== Other uses ==
- In the Night (ballet), a 1970 ballet by Jerome Robbins to nocturnes of Frédéric Chopin
- In the Night (film), a 1922 British-Dutch silent film directed by Frank Richardson

== See also ==
- Dans la Nuit (disambiguation)
- In the Night Garden..., a British children's television series 2007–2009
- In the Night Kitchen, a 1970 children's book by Maurice Sendak
- The Orphan's Tales: In the Night Garden, a 2006 novel by Catherynne M. Valente
- Strangers in the Night (disambiguation)
