= Helter Skelter =

Helter Skelter or Helter-Skelter may refer to:

== Arts and entertainment ==
=== Film ===
- Helter Skelter (1949 film), a British romantic comedy
- Helter Skelter (1976 film), an American crime film
- Helter Skelter (2004 film), an American crime film
- Helter Skelter (2012 film), a Japanese psychological horror film

=== Literature ===
- "Helter Skelter", a 1731 poem by Jonathan Swift
- Helter Skelter (book), 1974, by Vincent Bugliosi

=== Music ===
==== Albums ====
- Helter Skelter (Fred Frith and François-Michel Pesenti album), 1992
- Helter Skelter (The D.O.C. album), 1996

==== Songs ====
- "Helter Skelter" (song), 1968, by the Beatles
- "Helter Skelter", a 1997 song by Edge of Sanity from Infernal
- "Healter Skelter", a 2010 song by Shining from Blackjazz
- "Helter Skelter", a 2010 song by the Shapeshifters
- "Helter Skelter", a 2017 song by Tom Swoon and Maximals

=== Television ===
- "Helter Skelter" (Dexter), an episode of Dexter
- "Helter Skelter", an episode of Eureka Seven
- "Helter Skelter", an episode of Instant Star
- "Helter Skelter", an episode of Terror in Resonance
- Helter Skelter: An American Myth, a television series broadcast by Epix

=== Video games ===
- Helter Skelter, a race track in the video game R4: Ridge Racer Type 4
- Helter Skelter, a character in the video game No More Heroes

=== Other uses in arts and entertainment ===
- Helter Skelter (manga), a manga series by Kyoko Okazaki
- Helter Skelter I, a 2007 painting by Mark Bradford

== Other uses ==
- Helter Skelter (rave music promoter)
- Helter skelter (ride), an amusement ride with a spiral shaped slide
- Helter Skelter (scenario), an apocalyptic vision associated with the Manson Family
- Helter Skelter Publishing, an English publisher and bookshop
- Jayjay Helterbrand, a Filipino-American basketball player

== See also ==
- Helter Shelter (disambiguation)
- Helta Skelta, a 1993 album by Turbonegro
- Heltah Skeltah, an American hip hop duo
- Willy-nilly (idiom), an English idiom and slang
