= Beñat Achiary =

Basque vocal improviser

Beñat Achiary (born 1947) is a Basque vocal improviser who lives in southern France.

== Life and career ==
Achiary was born in Saint-Palais, Pyrénées-Atlantiques, in 1947. He has been interested in Basque folklore. In the second half of the 1980s he worked with the Tour de France ensemble. He met there the saxophonist Michel Doneda, with whom he collaborated for years. They founded a trio with the violinist Alexander Bălănescu, and played with quartet with percussionist Lê Quan Ninh and the hurdy-gurdy player Dominique Regef.

Achiary recorded several solo albums, including of Basque songs in contemporary context. He released three songs from Gherasim Luca's "heroes-limite" on his CD "Seven Circles for Peter" for the German label FMP in 2004. He played on albums by Jean-Marie Machado, Jean-François Pauvros, and Pedro Soler. Achiary also played in groups such as Earthly Bird and Hors Ciel.

He taught at the Bayonne Conservatoire and is artistic director of the Errobiko Festibala (Festival de la Nive) in Itxassou.
