= French folk music =

Music genre

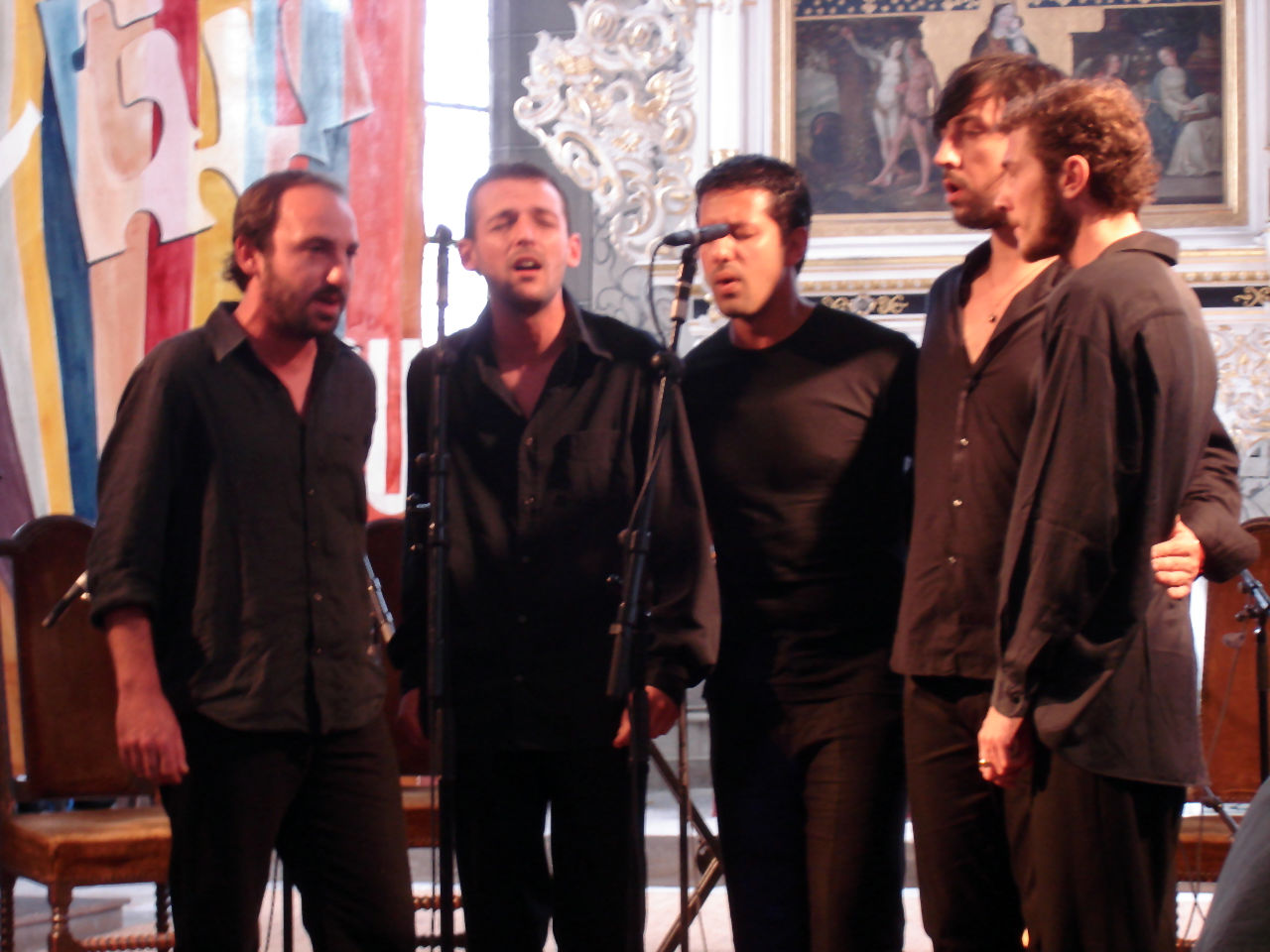
The Corsican group L'Alba

As Europe experienced a wave of roots revivals in the 1950s and 1960s, France found its regional culture reviving traditional music. Brittany, Limousin, Gascony, Corsica and Auvergne were among the regions that experienced a notable resurgence in the popularity of folk music. Traditional styles of music had survived most in remote areas, such as the island of Corsica and mountainous Auvergne, as well as the more nationalist lands of the Basques and Bretons.

In many cases, folk traditions were revived in relatively recent years to cater to tourists. These groupes folkloriques tend to focus on very early 20th century melodies and the use of the piano accordion.

Folk music and dance now has an established place as a popular pastime in its own right with innumerable festivals, concerts and bals folks across France and a number of regular publications devoted to it.

== Auvergne ==
Auvergne is known for cabrette bagpipes. The cabrette (little goat in Auvergnat) is a bagpipe made of goatskin (goats being an integral part of Auvergnat traditional life) and without drones, blown by elbow-driven bellows. Some famous old players : Martin Cayla, Jean Bergheaud, Marcel Bernard, Antoine Bouscatel, Joseph Costeroste, Georges Soule, and some modern players: Dominique Paris, Victor Laroussinie, Didier Pauvert, Stéphane Charpentier, Michel Esbelin, François Lazarevic. They play both regrets (slow airs), bourrées (typical auvergne danse) and swift, 3/8 dance music.

Joseph Canteloube was a well-known composer from Auvergne in the early 20th century, and produced a famous collection of folk music called Songs of the Auvergne.

== Béarn ==
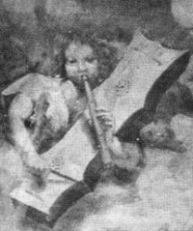
Angel playing the string drum in Fresco painting from Convento de la Concepción Épila, Aragón, Spain

Béarn's revivalist scene has been quite limited in scope, though it has produced the nationally renowned singer Marilis Orionaa. Traditional instruments from the area include the tambour de Béarn, a six-string drum used as a rhythm drone instrument to accompany the three-holed recorder.

== Gascony ==
One of the biggest stars of the French roots revival was Perlinpinpin Folc, formed in 1972 and led by Christian Lanau, whose Musique Traditionelle de Gascogne was a popular release that sparked interest in the traditional music of Gascony.

Gascon small pipes, called boha (bouhe), are a well-known part of the local scene. They have a rectangular chanter and drone combination, which is unique to Gascony, and are made out of sheepskin with the fleece showing.

== Languedoc ==
Languedoc is home to several unusual instruments, including the bodega, a kind of bagpipe, and the aboès and graille, both kinds of oboes. The bodega is made out of goatskin, using an unusual process in which the innards of the animal are removed through the neck so that the entire, unbroken skin can be used for the instrument. It has only one large shoulder drone. The bodega is known from at least the 14th century. Popular traditional groups from Languedoc include Calabrun, Trencavel, Laurent Audemard's Une Anche Passe and Trioc.

== Limousin ==
Limousin is known for its violin music, as well as the chabrette bagpipe. Eric Montbel is the biggest star of Limousin folk, while Françoise Etay, Jean Pierre Champeval, Olivier Durif, Valentin Clastrier and Pascal Lefeuvre are also popular. Instruments include the cabrette bagpipe and the ancient army fife, pifre. Limousin violin music, focussed in Corrèze, has produced stars François Etay and Trio Violon, while more modern fiddlers include François Breugnot, Olivier Durif, Jean Pierre Champeval and Jean-François Vrod. The hurdy-gurdy in Limousin has been extended to avant-garde styles utilizing electronic music, jazz and other influences, including Pascal Lefeuvre, Dominique Regef and Valentin Clastrier.

== Provence and Alps ==
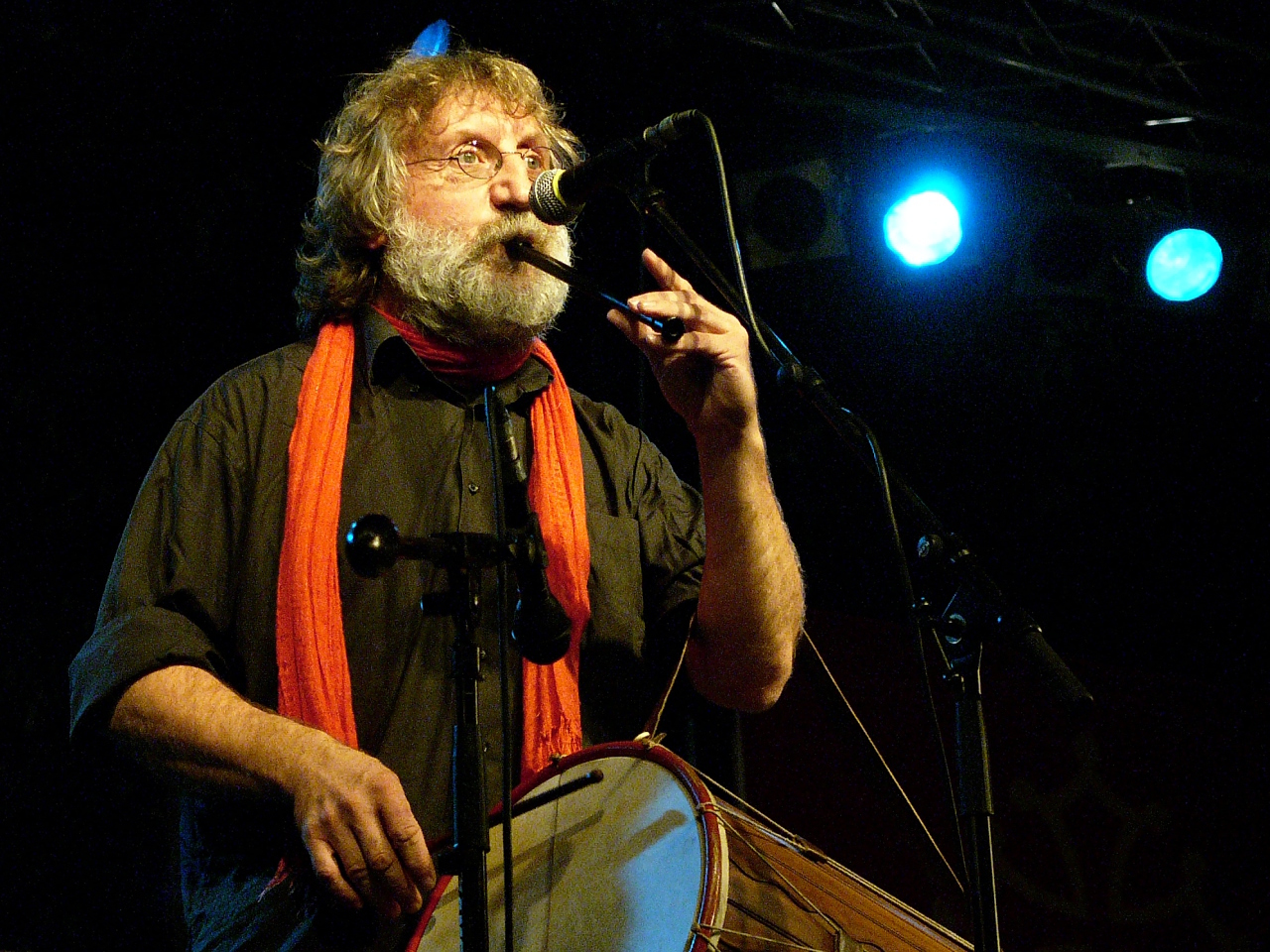
Singer Miquèu Montanaro

The most iconic form of Provençal folk music is a duo of fife and drum, or ensembles of galoubets-tambourins; the most prominent characteristic of the region's folk music, however, is the Italian musical influence. Performers include Patrice Conte, Yves Rousguisto and André Gabriel. Alpine diverse communities include Savoie, whose distinct hurdy gurdy tradition has produced the modern band La Kinkerne, the Alpes Maritimes choral tradition, which includes choirs like La Compagnie Vocale and Corous de Berra, and the northern region, which has produced a vibrant violin tradition, Dauphiné's rigaudon dance and performers Rigodon Sauvage, Patrick Mazellier and Drailles. Dauphiné also features one of the rare sword dances that have stood the test of time, the Bacchu-ber performed yearly in Briançon.

== Roussillon ==
The southwestern region of Roussillon's music is shaped by its unique ethnicities, and includes forms of Catalan and Gypsy music. The former includes the sardana and is based around the city of Perpignan. The sardana is played by a band (coble) consisting of three kinds of oboes, flutes and other instrument, including shawms and bagpipes among some recent revivalists. Modern traditional performers include Cobla Mil-Lenaria, La Cobla de Joglars, Els Ministrles del Rossellano and La Colba els Montgrins.
