= Strange Liberation =

Studio album by Dave Douglas
- Released: 27 January 2004
- Recorded: January 2003
- Genre: Jazz
- Label: Bluebird
- Producer: Dave Douglas

Dave Douglas chronology
| Freak In (2003) | Strange Liberation (2004) | Bow River Falls (2003) |

Strange Liberation is the 21st album by jazz trumpeter Dave Douglas. It was released on the Bluebird imprint of RCA Records in 2004. The album features the Dave Douglas Quintet plus guest guitarist Bill Frisell. The album received widespread critical acclaim and did well on the jazz album charts, reaching number three on Billboard's and number one on CMJ's.

== Overview ==
Trumpeter and bandleader Dave Douglas returns with his quintet that premiered on his 2002 album The Infinite. His band is composed of Chris Potter on tenor saxophone and bass clarinet, Uri Caine on Fender Rhodes, James Genus on bass, and Clarence Penn on drums, plus guest guitarist Bill Frisell. This is Douglas's first collaboration with Frisell, someone he had wanted to work with since 1987. This is Douglas's sixth release on Bluebird Records and was recorded by engineer Joe Ferla in DSD

Prior to the album's release Douglas premiered the track "The Frisell Dream" at the 2003 Monterey Jazz Festival. The track "Just Say This" refers to the September 11 attacks and their aftermath. Douglas attempts to respond to an eight-year-old's attempt to play Thelonious Monk's "Blue Monk" with the tune "Skeeter-ism". The album's title is derived from a phrase used by Martin Luther King Jr. in reference to America's involvement in the Vietnam War.

== Reception ==
Professional ratings
Review scores
| Source | Rating |
|---|---|
| Allmusic | 4.5/5 stars |

In the book Essential Jazz: the First 100 Years, the album is called "a fascinating amalgam of 4/4 swing grooves and rock-based electric textures reminiscent of Miles Davis's electric music of the late 1960s". John Kelman from All About Jazz counters that opinion by recounting that while Douglas's earlier release The Infinite did hearken back to late 1960s Davis, this release moves "completely into Dave Douglas territory". He concludes his review saying that the album is "another fine entry in a body of work that strives to break down barriers by eliminating preconceptions as to what music should or shouldn't be".

Dylan Hicks of City Pages call the album Douglas's "strongest effort" since signing with Bluebird, similarly Chris Dahlen of Pitchfork calls the album "a set of music that's simply one of the best written, paced and performed works in his catalog", in The New York Times Ben Ratliff calls it "the best album in several years by Dave Douglas", and Thom Jurek from Allmusic writes "in its imagination and depth it is one of the high marks of Douglas' thus far prolific career".

In All About Jazz, Marc Meyers says the album "explod[es] in a veritable riot of colors, moods, idioms, and rhythms". Billboard named the album a 'Critics' Choice' with Dan Ouellette calling it "a reflective, whimsical and driving quintet date". He goes on to refer to the Douglas/Frisell pairing as a "perfect tonal match". Thomas Conrad writes in JazzTimes that the album "possesses, in spades, that quality of immediacy essential to jazz".

== Track listing ==
All compositions by Dave Douglas

1. "A Single Sky" – 2:05
2. "Strange Liberation" – 8:04
3. "Skeeter-ism" – 5:58
4. "Just Say This" – 6:29
5. "Seventeen" - 8:39
6. "Mountains From the Train" – 5:15
7. "Rock of Billy" – 5:55
8. "The Frisell Dream" – 3:54
9. "Passing Through" – 1:36
10. "The Jones" – 4:24
11. "Catalyst" – 5:08

- Recorded in New York City in January 2003

== Personnel ==
- Dave Douglas – trumpet
- Bill Frisell – guitar
- Chris Potter – tenor saxophone, bass clarinet
- Uri Caine – Fender Rhodes
- James Genus – bass
- Clarence Penn – drums, percussion

=== Production ===
- Ann Cutting – cover photo
- Joe Ferla – associate producer, engineer, mixing
- Suzannah Kincannon – photography
- Hiroyuki Komuro – engineer
- Sheryl Lutz-Brown – design
- Jason Stasium – assistant
- David Weyner – executive producer
- Mark Wilder – mastering
- Kevin Wilson – assistant

== Charts ==
Jazz Albums Chart
| Year | Source | Peak |
|---|---|---|
| February 2004 | Billboard | 3 |
| February 2004 | CMJ | 1 |
