= Dans la Nuit =

Dans la Nuit may refer to:

- Dans la nuit (film), a 1929 film by Charles Vanel
- Dans la Nuit (album), a 2000 album by Louis Sclavis
- "Dans la nuit", a song by Reynaldo Hahn
- "Dans la Nuit", a 1966 song by Chantal Goya
- "Dans la Nuit", a 1964 tune by Jacques Denjean et Son Orchestre
