= Amerio =

Amerio or Amério is an Italian surname. Notable people with the surname include:

- Luigi Amerio (1912–2004), Italian electrical engineer and mathematician
- Romano Amerio (1905–1997), Swiss Roman Catholic theologian
- Sandy Amerio (born 1973), French film director
