= Re: Pasolini =

Studio album by Stefano Battaglia
- Released: May 15, 2007
- Recorded: April and July 2005
- Studio: Artesuono Studio; Udine, Italy
- Genre: Jazz
- Length: 118:32
- Label: ECM; ECM 1998/99
- Producer: Manfred Eicher, Stefano Battaglia

Stefano Battaglia chronology
Raccolto (2005)	Re: Pasolini (2007)	Pastorale (2010)

Re: Pasolini is a double album by Italian jazz pianist Stefano Battaglia, recorded in 2005 and released on ECM in 2007, and is dedicated to the figure of filmmaker and writer Pier Paolo Pasolini. The cover artwork features a still from the film The Gospel According to Matthew (1964), considered one of his masterworks.

== The compositions ==
The album is split over two discs: the first one features a well-planned, slow-tempo track list; the second shows more subdued and improvised hues, and the pieces become more lackadaisical.

"Canzone di Laura Betti", as the title suggests, is dedicated to actress Laura Betti. "Totò e Ninetto" was named after actors Totò and Ninetto Davoli: the title refers to Pasolini's film, The Hawks and the Sparrows, in which the actors play two priests who preach whilst prowling around aimlessly. "Canto Popolare" is an aria which pays homage to Italian traditional folk songs. "Fevrar" (February), refers to an early poem in Friulan dialect by Pasolini; Battaglia defines the composition an homage "to the undefinable light of Friuli, a dance inspired by its borders and boundaries." "Il Sogno di una Cosa" ("The Dream of a Thing") is a nostalgic look at an archaic Italy now vanished, whilst "Teorema" refers to Pasolini's film of the same name. "Callas" refers to the noted opera singer, Maria Callas, who took part in Pasolini's Medea. Originally, the piece was to have featured piano, strings and percussion. The track that closes the first disc is "Pietra Lata", named after a neighbourhood of Rome. The song expressed the Rome described in the works of Rossellini and Pasolini,

"where the city is reveled in its vital figure through its metamorphosis: the biting glow of the Roman sky on bridges stones, the bright prisons of car's metal, the scorching and almost oily dust of the summer's breeze, the rain-soaked streets at night, the asphalt mirroring the reflections of the windows and the street lamps[...], a melancholic, merciless Rome."

The second disc opens with "Lyra", a hymn to Pasolini and his poetic side. The composition is a series of eight brief, free-form variations – originally, fifteen pieces were recorded. "Meditazione Orale" ("Oral Meditation") is based on an audio recording featuring music by Ennio Morricone and the original text of the same name issued in 1974, while "Scritti Corsari" refers to Pasolini's fighting side, his approach towards politics and ethic. Similarly, "Setaccio" focuses on the figure of the young Pasolini developing his artistic interests. "Mimesis, Divina Mimesis" represents "the dialogue, the fight between what is real and its mimesis." The title also refers to Pasolini's Divina Mimesis, a rereading of Dante's Divine Comedy. "Ostia" is named after the town near Rome, where Pasolini was mysteriously and brutally murdered on November 1, 1975. The piece wants to depict "Pasolini's last heartbeats, a soundtrack to that violent and gory tragedy." Ultimately, "Pasolini" resulted from Battagia's fusion of two pieces, one inspired by Pasolini's playing soccer. This was the first piece written by Battaglia to honour the filmmaker.

== Reception ==
Professional ratings
Review scores
Source	Rating
AllMusic	4.5/5 stars
All About Jazz	4.5/5 stars
The Guardian	3/5 stars
The Penguin Guide to Jazz Recordings	4/4 stars

In his review for AllMusic, Thom Jurek says "To call Stefano Battaglia's Re: Pasolini on ECM, ambitious would be an erroneous understatement. In fact, it is an undertaking of enormous propensity ... Battaglia's work is an epic, and yes, a masterpiece that is a force in and of itself to be reckoned with. It is the high point in an already celebrated career."

The Penguin Jazz Guide notes that the album is "A demanding listen over two long discs, but absolutely essential modern music, whether all of it jazz or not hardly seems the issue."

All About Jazz reviewer John Kelman wrote: "Battaglia honors Pasolini's multiplicity of interests through a series of compositions covering a wide range of emotional resonances, from stark beauty to jagged and, sometimes, chaotic disturbance ... Re: Pasolini is a most fitting tribute to one of Italy's more controversial figures by one of Italy's more ambitious and stylistically far-reaching pianists."

John Fordham of The Guardian gave the album three stars noting "It's very contemporary-classical and darkly preoccupied in feel, but the kind of set that reveals more on every listen."

In a review for JazzTimes, Steve Futterman states "Each of the album’s two discs sports its own personality and distinct instrumentation. Disc one finds Battaglia merging, in various configurations, with a small group. His quietly stated themes... find room for improvisation, but of a conspicuously integrated nature... Disc two leaves the melodic ease and ensemble weave behind. Here, Battaglia conceives pieces-the majority compact duets between piano and strings-that owe more to 20th-century classical music than to conventional jazz forms. The second disc’s mood remains as stringently introspective as the previous disc was meditatively warm. Yet Battaglia’s dramatic flair imbues each of these austere performances with a vitality that keeps you attentive even as it casts a chill.... Re: Pasolini is a triumph for Battaglia, the pianist, composer and arranger."

== Track listing ==
All compositions by Stefano Battaglia, unless otherwise noted.

Disc One

1. "Canzone di Laura Betti" – 5:00
2. "Totò e Ninetto" – 4:47
3. "Canto Popolare" – 5:04
4. "Cosa Sono le Nuvole" (Modugno, Pasolini) – 7:15
5. "Fevrar" – 9:10
6. "Il Sogno di una Cosa" – 4:49
7. "Teorema" – 10:41
8. "Callas" – 5:07
9. "Pietra Lata" – 10:08

Disc Two

1. "Lyra I" – 1:12
2. "Lyra II" 3:34
3. "Meditazione Orale" – 5:24
4. "Lyra III" – 1:59
5. "Lyra IV" – 2:01
6. "Scritti Corsari" – 1:22
7. "Lyra V" – 2:20
8. "Epigrammi" – 2:27
9. "Lyra VI" – 1:33
10. "Setaccio" – 2:20
11. "Lyra VII" – 4:07
12. "Mimesis, Divina Mimesis" – 7:08
13. "Lyra VIII" – 5:35
14. "Ostia" – 11:22
15. "Pasolini" – 4:07

== Personnel ==
=== Disc one ===
- Stefano Battaglia – piano
- Aya Shimura – cello
- Salvatore Maiore – bass
- Roberto Dani – drums
- Mirco Mariottini – clarinet
- Michael Gassmann – trumpet

=== Disc two ===
- Stefano Battaglia – piano
- Dominique Pifarély – violin
- Vincent Courtois – cello
- Bruno Chevillon – bass
- Michele Rabbia – percussion
