= Georgia Spiropoulos =

Greek composer (born 1965)

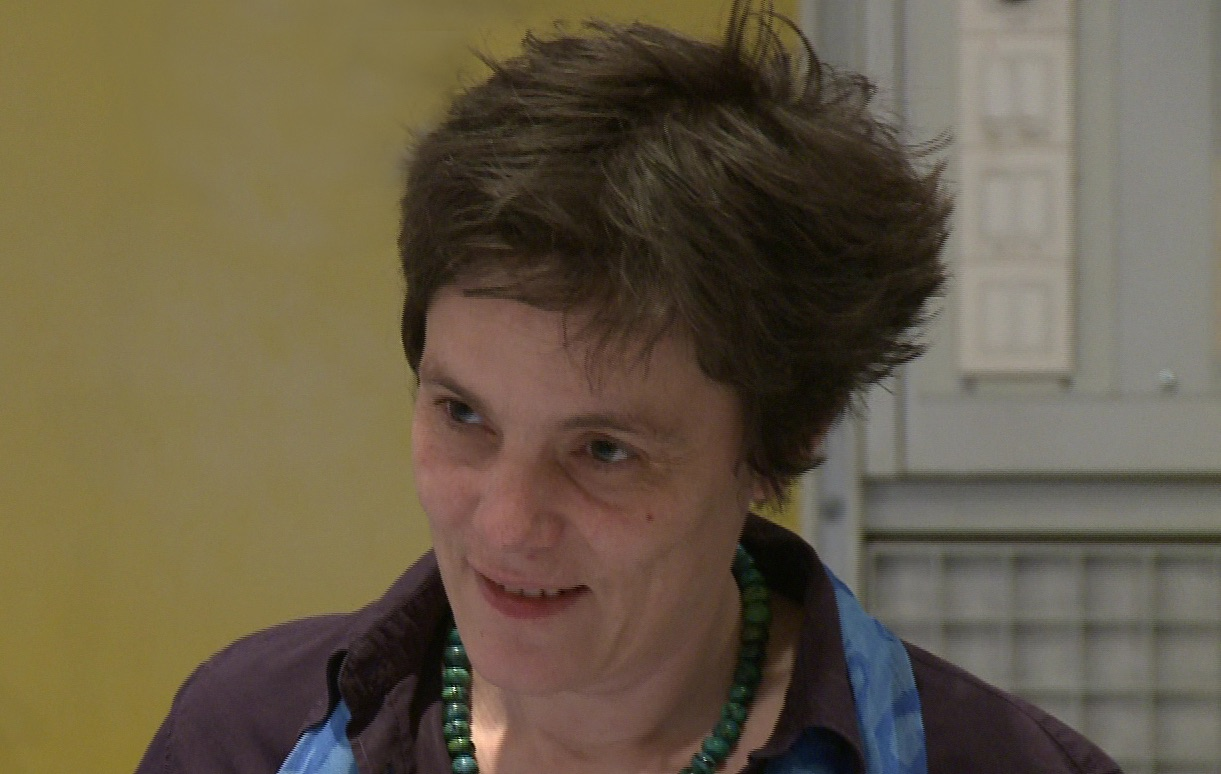
- Georgia Spiropoulos - Working at IRCAM 2010

Background information
- Born: 1965 (age 60–61); Greece
- Occupation: Composer
- Website: Georgia Spiropoulos official site

Georgia Spiropoulos (Greek: Γεωργία Σπυροπούλου) (born in Greece, 1965) is a composer. She is also an arranger, instrumentalist, and multimedia artist.

== Biography ==
She was born in Athens in 1965. Studying piano, she was introduced to jazz, also studying counterpoint and fugue. She initially worked as a performer, arranger, and transcriber of Greek oral-tradition music. She studied piano, harmony, counterpoint and fugue in Athens. At the same time, she studied jazz piano and worked as an instrumentalist and arranger of Hellenic traditional music of oral transmission for ten years.

In 1996, she moved from Athens to Paris, leaning under Philippe Leroux and discovering electroacoustic music.

She earned a master in Arts and Languages from the École des hautes études en sciences sociales (EHESS), and in Paris has studied music composition, electro-acoustic and computer music with Philippe Leroux. She studied form analysis with Michael Levinas, and composition with Jacques Charpentier. She also worked with George Crumb and Günter Kahowez in France, Austria and Greece.

In 2000, she attended the computer music course at IRCAM. She was one of the ten selected composers to participate to the IRCAM's Composition and Musical Computing Annual Course and worked with Jonathan Harvey, Brian Ferneyhough, Tristan Murail, Marco Stroppa, Philippe Hurel and Ivan Fedele.

In 2008 she worked as composer-in-research with the project "Mask: Voice transformations and computer tools for live performance".

== Commissions and works ==
She received commissions from the French Ministry of Culture, the Baden-Württemberg Ministry of Culture, Radio France, IRCAM-Centre Pompidou, "Marseille-Provence Cultural Capital of Europe 2013", Sacem, the Onassis Foundation, Haus der Kulturen der Welt, La Muse en circuit and numerous ensembles.

In 2010, she produced "Les Bacchantes", a tribute to Iannis Xenakis, with the piece including lights, stage action, and electronics. It was performed by vocalist Médéric Collignon. Wrote Le Monde, "the harshness, not to say the savagery, of the vocal dimension (rattles, howls, strangled sounds or obtained by tapping on the throat) is of today's orality (Spiropoulos says he listened to certain types of rock) while electronics, of the virtual siren kind, refer to the 'ancient' civilization of the studio."

In 2015, she collaborated on "Roll.... n'Roll...n'Roll" with harpist Hélène Breschand.

Spiropoulos's works are published by Babelscores, Paris and by herself. Her music has been released by Eole Records, Subrosa, Collection QB, ArsPublica labels and Conservatoire de Paris - Cité de la Musique.

== Performances and multimedia work ==
Her works are performed internationally at Centre Pompidou, Cité de la Musique, IRCAM, Louvre Auditorium (Paris), Symphony Space (New York), Yerba Buena Center for the Arts (San Francisco), Radial System V (Berlin), Gasteig München (Munich), ZKM (Karlsruhe), AOI Concert Hall (Shizuoka), Pollack Hall, Le Gesù, Le Vivier (Montreal), Felicja Blumenthal Music Center, Hateiva Hall (Tel Aviv), Concert Hall of the Academy of Music (Krakow), Onassis Stegi, French Institut, and the Goethe Institut (Athens).

She participated at festivals such as Manifeste, Agora, Ars Musica, [enso Days Berlin, Présences - Radio France, Athens & Epidaurus Festival, In Transit - International Festival of Performing Arts - Berlin, Seamus, Extension, Musiques Libres de Besançon, Gegenwelten Festival Neue Musik, Futura, WhyNote, Aujourd'hui Musiques, Musiques de Notre Temps, Hateiva, Sinkro, ICEM, ICMC, SMC, WFAE, WOCMAT, Electroacoustic Music Days of Greece, The Electronic Arts and Music Festival of Miami, and the Boston Cyberarts Festival.

In 2018, she released "Interjections" for saxophone quartet and electroacoustic device. In 2019, Le Monde reporte she had created a multimedia performance during the financial crisis of Athens based on a tag found on a wall, called "Eror (The Pianist)." It became a program of the IRCAM festival on June 6, 2019. It involved sound, visual, staging, and lighting that she designed.

== Collaborations ==
She collaborates with many ensembles, such as the Ensemble Intercontemporain, L’Itinéraire, Ensemble 2e2m, Sillages, Ars Nova, San Francisco Contemporary Music Players, McGill Contemporary Music Ensemble, Aventure, Nikel, dissonArt, Bl!ndman, Sixtrum, Smashensemble, Curious Chamber Players, Pulsar Trio, Zafraan, and Octopus.

She has collaborated with choirs (Accentus, Les Cris de Paris, Le Jeune Choeur de Paris), saxophone quartets (Prism, Habanera, Quasar), and soloists (Claude Delangle, Médéric Collignon, Hélène Breschand, Alvise Sinivia, Shigeko Hata, Geraldine Keller, Theophilos Sotiriades, Vincent David, Valérie Joly).

She has also collaborated with conductors such as Laurence Equilbey, David Milnes, Mark Foster, Pierre Roulier, Guillaume Bourgogne, Geoffroy Jourdain, and Nicolas Krüger.

== Teaching ==
- Distinguished Visiting Chair in Music Composition. Active Director of the Digital Composition Studio (DCS). 2017-18 At McGill she taught music composition and electroacoustic music.
- ilSUONO 2019 International Contemporary Music Academy. Instructor, composer-in-residence. 2019
- Master classes and conferences : Columbia University (NYC), McGill University (Montreal), University of California Santa Barbara, University of Paris 7, University of Paris 8, University of Crete, IRCAM, ICMC and SMC International Conferences, Ars Musica Colloquium, Hochschule für Musik und Theater München, Paris Conservatory CRR, Tel Aviv Conservatory, Alte Schmiede-Vienna, French Institut of Athens.
- Jury member: IRCAM, ICMC and SMC International Conferences, master in Arts and Languages from the École des hautes études en sciences sociales (EHESS). ilSuono Summer Academy.

== Awards ==
- Civitella Ranieri Foundation Fellow 2020. Residency 2021.
- Knight of the Order of Arts and Letters 2013. Made by France's Minister of Culture and Communication Aurélie Filippetti.
- Royal Abbey of Fontevraud Fellowship 2017
- Cité Internationale des Arts Fellowship 2009-2011
- Villa Medicis Hors-les-Murs Award 2002 AFAA & the French Ministry of Foreign Affairs; Composer-in-residence in the United States (NYC, Boston & Cambridge, 2003-2004).

== Personal life ==
As of 2021, she lived in Paris.

== Works ==
- External link

== Discography ==
- Phonotopia by Eole Records (booklet)
- Full discography

== Bibliography ==
- External link
