= L'affrontement des prétendants =

Studio album by the Louis Sclavis Quintet
- Released: 2001
- Recorded: September 1999
- Studio: Studios la Buissonne; Pernes-les-Fontaines, France
- Genre: Avant-garde jazz
- Length: 63:37
- Label: ECM; ECM 1705
- Producer: Manfred Eicher

Louis Sclavis chronology
| Les Violences de Rameau (1996) | L'affrontement des prétendants (2001) | Dans la Nuit (2000) |

L'affrontement des prétendants is an album by the Louis Sclavis Quintet recorded in September 1999 and released on ECM in 2001. The quintet features trumpeter Jean-Luc Cappozzo, cellist Vincent Courtois and rhythm section Bruno Chevillon and François Merville.

== Reception ==
The AllMusic review by Thom Jurek awarded the album 4½ stars stating, "It is as a quintet this band plays, as a musical unit that is seasoned and confident and in full possession of its strengths and musical empathies. So democratic and accomplished is this band that it sounds as if it has no leader, but only music to play. And that's as high a compliment as any reviewer can pay."

Professional ratings
Review scores
| Source | Rating |
|---|---|
| AllMusic | 4.5/5 stars |
| The Penguin Guide to Jazz Recordings | 4/4 stars |

== Track listing ==
All compositions by Louis Sclavis, except as noted.

1. "L'affrontement des prétendants" - 8:45
2. "Distances" (Vincent Courtois, Sclavis) - 3:19
3. "Contre contre" - 6:40
4. "Hors les murs" (Bruno Chevillon) - 2:50
5. "Possibles" - 5:25
6. "Hommage à Lounès Matoub" - 16:59
7. "Le temps d'après" - 8:06
8. "Maputo Introduction" - 2:32
9. "Maputo" 6:32
10. "La mémoire des mains" (Chevillon, François Merville, Sclavis) - 2:29

== Personnel ==
=== Louis Sclavis Quintet ===
- Louis Sclavis – clarinet, bass clarinet, soprano saxophone
- Jean-Luc Cappozzo – trumpet
- Vincent Courtois – cello
- Bruno Chevillon – double bass
- François Merville – drums
