= Music of Limousin =

The best known musician from the Occitan region of Limousin is probably the piper Eric Montbel, a former member of such bands as Lo Jai, Le Grand Rouge, and Ulysse; he plays the chabreta, or Limousin bagpipe. Along with him and other pipers, the region is known for Corrèze's distinct violin tradition as well as the hurdy-gurdy. The fife is also popular.

== History ==
A music school was established at the abbey Saint Martial of Limoges in Limousin in the 11th century.

== List of performers ==
- Guy Bertrand
- François Breugnot, violin
- Jean Pierre Champeval, violin
- Valentin Clastrier, hurdy-gurdy
- Jean-Marc Delaunay, violin
- Olivier Durif, violin
- Françoise Etay, violin
- Pierre Imbert
- Jean-Yves Lameyre, violin, hurdy-gurdy
- Myriam Lameyre, bagpipes
- Pascal Lefeuvre, bagpipes
- Christian Oller
- Dominique Regef, hurdy-gurdy
- Trio Violon, violin
- Jean-François Vrod, violin
