= Silk and Salt Melodies =

Studio album by the Louis Sclavis Quartet
- Released: August 22, 2014
- Recorded: March 2014
- Studio: Studios la Buissonne; Pernes-les-Fontaines
- Genre: Jazz
- Length: 1:02:36
- Label: ECM; ECM 2402
- Producer: Manfred Eicher

Louis Sclavis chronology
Sources (2012)	Silk and Salt Melodies (2014)	Ida Lupino (2016)

Professional ratings
Review scores
Source	Rating
All About Jazz	4.5/5 stars
The Guardian	4/5 stars

Silk and Salt Melodies is a jazz album by the Louis Sclavis Quartet recorded March 2014 and released on ECM August later that year. The quartet features Gilles Coronado on guitars, Benjamin Moussay on keys, and Keyvan Chemirani on percussion.

== Reception ==
Karl Ackermann in All About Jazz gave a four and a half star review saying, "Putting Silk and Salt Melodies in the context of Sclavis' larger body of work is somewhat irrelevant; he builds, incorporates and moves on. It's a good philosophy for listening as well."

The Guardian awarded the album four stars, with John Fordham saying, "The Frenchman [Louis Sclavis] is one of the most consistently satisfying, yet surprising jazz-driven composer-players in Europe.... The playing is terrific, but—as so often with Sclavis—the themes are even better."

== Track listing ==
All tracks are written by Louis Sclavis

No.	Title	Length
1.	"Le parfum de l'éxil"	9:00
2.	"L'homme sud"	9:22
3.	"L'autre rive"	8:15
4.	"Sel et soie"	7:36
5.	"Dance for Horses"	6:59
6.	"Des feux lointains"	5:49
7.	"Cortège"	8:40
8.	"Dust and Dogs"	5:50
9.	"Prato Plage"	1:05
Total length:		1:02:36

== Personnel ==
=== Louis Sclavis Quartet ===
- Louis Sclavis – clarinet
- Gilles Coronado – guitar
- Benjamin Moussay – piano, keyboard
- Keyvan Chemirani – percussion
