= Rouge (Louis Sclavis Quintet album) =

Studio album by Louis Sclavis Quintet
- Released: March 1992
- Genre: Jazz
- Length: 63:24
- Label: ECM
- Producer: Manfred Eicher

Louis Sclavis chronology
Ellington on the Air (1991)	Rouge (1992)	Trio de Clarinettes: Live (1991)

Rouge is an album by French jazz musician Louis Sclavis, recorded in 1991 and released in 1992 on the ECM label. It was reissued in 2006 and 2019.

== Reception ==
In a review for Jazzwise, Robert Shore wrote: "I don't know what the Frenchman's inspiration for the title of this recording was – Rouge (Red) – but there's a fair bit of intergalactic shimmering going on in clarinetist/saxophonist Sclavis's ECM debut from 1991. And, of course, ECM is very good at capturing this sort of soundscape... It's a heady brew, pitched somewhere between avant-garde jazz and chamber music." According to The Penguin Guide to Jazz, "Sclavis's ECM debut is a challenging and surprisingly abstract set that rarely allows itself to settle into a jazz groove. Rouge establishes Sclavis as an enterprising and thought-provoking composer. If it does so at the expense of rhythmic energy (a strategy consistent with his ambivalence about jazz percussion), it doesn't short-change in other departments."

Professional ratings
Review scores
Source	Rating
The Penguin Guide to Jazz	3.5/4 stars

== Track listing ==
1. "One" (Louis Sclavis, Dominique Pifarély) - 2:35
2. "Nacht" (Louis Sclavis) - 8:04
3. "Kali la nuit" (François Raulin) - 5:20
4. "Reflet" (Louis Sclavis) - 3:05
5. "Reeves" (François Raulin) - 7:03
6. "Les bouteilles" (Louis Sclavis) - 7:52
7. "Moment donné" (Dominique Pifarély) - 4:16
8. "Face Nord" (Louis Sclavis) - 10:33
9. "Rouge" (Louis Sclavis) - 5:15 / "Pourquoi une valse" (Louis Sclavis, François Raulin) - 1:24
10. "Yes love" (Louis Sclavis) - 5:57

== Personnel ==
- Louis Sclavis - Clarinets, Soprano Saxophone
- Dominique Pifarély - Violin
- Bruno Chevillon - Bass
- François Raulin - Piano, Synthesizer
- Christian Ville - Drums
