= Hélène Breschand =

French harpist and composer

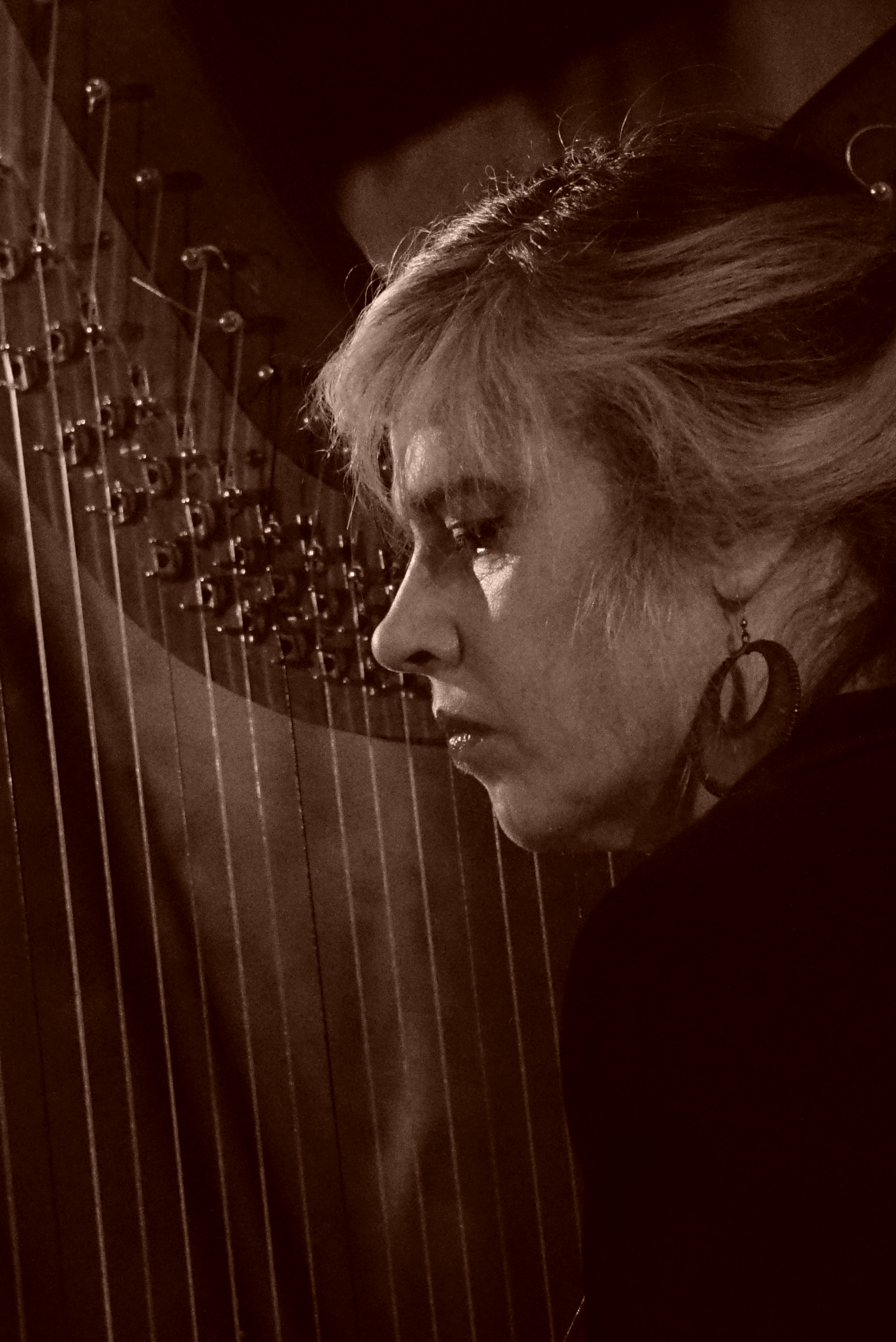

Background information
- Instrument: harp

Hélène Breschand (born 18 March 1966) is a French harpist, composer and improviser. Breschand leads a career both as a solo artist as well as in ensemble work, playing both a contemporary repertoire and premiering new works as much as she plays improvised music and musical theater. She is a musician who plays on the verge of several genres ranging from contemporary music to jazz. She plays both written and improvised music.

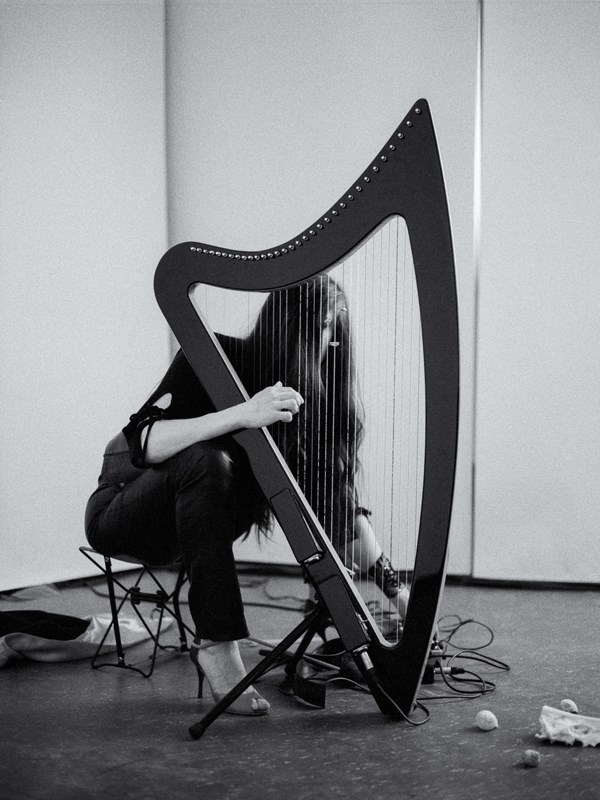
2017

== Family ==
She was born to the painters Thérèse Boucraut and Maurice Breschand in Paris. Her brother is the director Jean Breschand. She is the niece of singers Jacqueline and Roger Leroy.

== Life and career ==
Born in Paris into a family of artists, she discovered contemporary music during the heyday of the serial music movement, and discovered free jazz and the expansion of new technologies as early as the 1970s.

She began learning harp with Martine Géliot, before deciding to continue with Brigitte Sylvestre. Sylvestre initiated Breschand into musical theater and contemporary music. She obtained the "Médaille d'or" and the "Prix d'Excellence" by unanimity at the Conservatoire à Rayonnement Régional of Paris under the direction of Sylvestre and obtained the "Prize of Analysis" under the direction of Christian Acaoui. She teaches harp, gives an improvisation workshop at the conservatory of the 6th arrondissement in Paris and she is regularly invited to give workshops around the world.

She has met and participated in the creation of new works in chamber ensembles and orchestras where she has worked with Luciano Berio, Bernard Cavanna, Pascal Dusapin, Emmanuel Nùnes, François Sarhan, etc. Breschand has also had several pieces for solo harp composed especially for her.

She regularly performs contemporary repertoire by composers such as Georges Aperghis, John Cage, Mauricio Kagel, Luc Ferrari, Jacques Rebotier, Georgia Spiropoulos, Yoshihisa Taira, Kasper T. Toeplitz, Tôn-Thất Tiết, David Toop, etc.

She has played both written and improvised music with musicians such as Sophie Agnel, Uriel Barthélémi, Bruno Chevillon, Médéric Collignon, Vincent Courtois, Marc Ducret, Michel Doneda, Michel Godard, Sylvain Kassap, Joelle Léandre, Vincent Le Quang, Thierry Madiot, Jean-Marc Montera, Michael Nick, Annick Nozati, Zeena Parkins, Jean-François Pauvros, Didier Petit, Edith Scob, Elliott Sharp, The Do, Kasper Toeplitz, Franck Vigroux, Wilfried Wendling, etc.

She has often played in museum settings for different exhibitions and installations (Nox or Pierick Sorin, in museums in Arles, Nantes, Paris, Strasbourg, Troyes, etc.). Her interest in fine arts lead to her collaboration on works by Christian Marclay. Invited by Marcly, she interpreted "Graffiti composition" several times as well as played "Shuffle" in several different configurations, such as Screenplay, at la Villette in Paris with Elliott Sharp.

== Collaborations ==
Breschand has collaborated with artists in multiple artistic disciplines such as fine arts, dance, film, lighting and theater.

She also works in collaboration with choreographers (Mic Guillaumes, Anja Hempel, etc.), directors (Jean-Claude Berutti, Daniel Mesguich, etc.), performance artists (Pierick Sorin, Jacques Perconte, Hiroshi Sugimoto, etc.) and film (music to The Passion of Joan of Arc by Carl Theodor Dreyer, Salomé by Charles Bryant, Le Voile brûlé by Viviane Candas, etc.). She participated in the composition of Bruno Coulais's music for Henry Selick's 3D animated film Coraline.

She collaborated with the ensembles Transeuropééennes with Pablo Cueco (including the creation of a work by Cueco with Chaurasia at the Théatre de la Ville), Le Banquet for the premiere of the opera by Bernard Cavanna, Ars Nova, for the reprise of Laborintus II by Luciano Berio as well as with Ensemble 2e2m and Erwartung.

Breschand began playing improvised music through Didier Petit with whom she regularly played in the ensemble of Denis Colin.

She has had a trio with Didier Petit and Sylvain Kassap and a duo with Jean-François Pauvros for many years.

Breschand is co-founder of the contemporary music ensemble Laborintus with Sylvain Kassap and Franck Masquelier.

From 1999 to 2005, she participated in the creation and was president of the collective Topophonie with Sophie Agnel, Thierry Madiot and Théo Jarrier. The collective's ambition was to bring artistic experiences into public places, doing sound walks, events and improvisations in outdoor spaces as a way of blurring the distinction between music and life. Pascal Battus, Li-Ping Ting, Dante Feijoo and Sharif Sehnaoui later joined the collective.

Since 1998, (date of the creation of Regard en Abyme for harp and electronics), she has a duo with Wilfried Wendling with whom she develops staged shows with electronics, text and video.

In 2001, she participated in the Ensemble d'Improvisateurs Européens, created by Jean-Marc Montera, who brought together such musicians as Chris Cutler and Thomas Lehn. The ensemble did a tour throughout France and in other countries where they interpreted Treatise by Cornelius Cardew.

In 2003, she contributed to the creation of the show Le Grand Crwth by François Sarhan and Anja Hempel.

In 2005, she composed the music for the show Ariane(s) with the circus artist Cécile Mont-Reynaud.

Since 2009, she has been developing a duo with the Cameroonian poet and singer Ze Jam Afane.

She created the show "Double Face" with and for Isabelle Moretti in 2009.

In 2010, she met the members of the pop band The Do. She played on their second album and continues to collaborate with the lead singer Olivia Merilahti.

In 2011, she participated in the creation of David Toop's opera Star Shaped Biscuit with Elaine Mitchener, Jamie McDermott, Sylvia Hallett, Lore Lixenberg, Allen, Martin Allen, and Jan Hendrickse.

In 2013, she began a duo with the video artist Jacques Perconte.

In 2014, Helene started a duo with Kasper Toeplitz, following the creation of a solo piece for harpe and electronics by this composer, at the center for creation GRAME.

== Composer and author ==
As a composer, Breschand has developed a semi-graphic compositional style which leaves room for improvisation. She been edited by Billaudot, as well as Misterioso.

She composed the music for the film Le Voile brûlé by Viviane Candas and for the silent films The Passion of Joan of Arc by Carl Theodore Dreyer and Salomé by Charles Bryan. She has also contributed composed music for experimental cinema.

She is the initiator and co-author with Laurence Bancaud, Aurélie Barbé and Mathilde Aubat-Andrieu of the book La Harpe aux XXème et XXIème Siècles, published in 2012 by Minerve Editions.

=== Selected compositions ===
- Fire, electroacoustic piece for harp, voice and radiophonic archives, 2007
- Ô, electroacoustic piece, 2012
- Sleeping woman for solo voice, musical theatre, 2000
- Si Loin, Si Proche, for directed instrumental ensemble, free nomenclature, graphic score, 2013
- L, for instrumental ensemble, free nomenclature (plus audio support), graphic score, 2014
- Soleil Rouge, Lune Folle, for solo alto, 2013
- Minotaure, for solo harpe, 2006
- Improvisation I, II, III, for solo harp, 1998
- Infidélité, for 4 voices, musical theater, 2001
- Délire, for solo voice or accompanied, musical theater, 2010
- A Vos Risques et Périls, solo for harp, musical theater, 2011
- Antre De Jeux, solo or duo, musical theater, free nomenclature, 2011
- Nuit Blanche, harp duo, 2000
- Double Face, harp duo, 2011.

== Selected discography ==
- "Les Incarnés", solo; voice, acoustic and electric harp, original compositions by Hélène Breschand, label: D'AUTRES CORDES
- "Le Gout Du Sel", Solo; voice, acoustic and electric harp, original compositions by Hélène Breschand, label : D'AUTRES CORDES
- "Hélène Breschand Harpiste Joue", pieces by Berio, Cage, Taïra, Ton-That Tiet and improvisations, label: IN SITU
- "Lascaux Expérience", compositions by Luis Naón, performed by LABORINTUS, label: CÉSARÉ
- "Zodiacales", Based on Les Tierkreis by Karlheinz STOCHKAUSEN, performed by LABORINTUS, label DAPHÉNÉO
- "Et Tournent Les Sons", Compositions by Luc Ferrari, performed by LABORINTUS, label : CÉSARÉ and La Muse en circuit
- "Sombre", Duo with Jean-François PAUVROS, label: VICTO
- Double-peine, Duo with Sylvain Kassap, label: D'AUTRES CORDES
- Alpentöne, 2004, with: Michel Godard – serpent, tuba; Linda Bsiri – voice, trumscheit; Christina Zavalloni – voice; Gabrielle Mirabassi – clarinet; Hélène Breschand – harp; Pierre Favre – drums; Calinxtus – gregorian chant (conducted by Gianni di Gennaro).
- "Fleuve", 2003 – with Pierre Favre Ensemble, label : ECM
- "Triste Lilas" by Franck Vigroux, label : D'AUTRES CORDES, 2004
- "Les Incarnés", Vinyl, 2014 – compositions voice and harp Hélène Breschand, label : D'AUTRES CORDES, 2014
- "Austral", d'eRikm by Laborintus, DVD, label : D'AUTRES CORDES, 2012

== Collaborations ==
- "Hell (A Small Detail)" by François Sarhan, Label: Zig Zag
- "Thisness" by Jef Lee Johnson, Label: Nato
- "De L'Origine Du Monde" by Tony Hymas, Label: Nato
