= Stefano Battaglia =

Italian classical and jazz pianist

Stefano Battaglia (born 1965 in Milan) is an Italian classical and jazz pianist, as well as a soloist and bandleader. He has played more than 3,000 concerts as an improviser in many important festivals and international appointments over the world. He has also recorded more than 100 CDs and received numerous awards for his solo piano and trio recordings. He is currently working on an anthology of recordings called the Book of Jazz.

== Life and career ==
Stefano Battaglia was born on August 31, 1965, in Milano, Lombardia, Italy, and began to study piano when he was seven years old. He graduated from the Conservatory of Milan, a college of music located in Milan, Italy. He mainly played Baroque keyboard repertoire in Italy and also abroad, with a main focus on composers such as Bach, Scarlatti, and Handel, as well as XVII century program and modern music with a focus on composers like Hindemith, Boulez Messiaen, and Ligeti.

Battaglia has performed extensively nationally, performing as a soloist with the European Youth Orchestra in Barcelona (1981). He won the J.S. Bach Festival award in Düsseldorf for best new pianist of the year (1986) and the Brussels National Radio Award as the best young European pianist (1997), earning him wider attention worldwide. He made his solo debut in 1987 as the leader with "Things Ain't What They Used to Be" on the Splasc(h) label. He has since recorded and led more than 15 recordings for the label Splasc(h), with pieces ranging from solo works to 16-piece ensemble Theatrum. In 1991, he also performed as a soloist of the Orchestra Giovanile Europea.

He was invited at the Swiss Radio and Italian radio television to play the J.S. Bach's Art of the Fugue and Partitas, as well as English virginal music from the sixteenth century (Fitzwilliam Virginal Book), and was rewarded as best new talent of 1988 and 1999 best Italian musician from the Musica Jazz magazine.

== Collaborations ==
In addition to his international performances, Battaglia has also participated in several collaborations with Italian musicians and international artists, including Lee Konitz, Kenny Wheeler, Dewey Redman, Tony Oxley, Barre Phillips, Steve Swallow, Enrico Rava, Aldo Romano, Bill Elgart, Dominique Pifarely, Jay Clayton, Pierre Favre, and many others. Other than solo performances, he has also focused on studying the trio format of piano, bass, and drums, as well as the duo piano-percussion format with Tony Oxley, Pierre Favre, Bill Elgart, and Michele Rabbia.

Battaglia has been working on ongoing duo projects with pianist Enrico Peiranunzi, as well as drummer Tony Oxley. He also works in the trio ALA alongside cellist Chico Marquez and clarinetist Gabriele Mirabassi. In 2009, he recorded an album of duets with percussionist and electronic musician Michele Rabbia, which was issued by ECM in 2010 as Pastorale. In that same year, he worked on trio albums recorded with double bassist Salvatore Maiore and drummer Roberto Dani, which featured 10 tracks that focused on drawing inspiration from mythical places. The albums were later released as The River of Anyder in 2011 and Songways in March 2013.

Battaglia has also recorded a number of pieces for many different labels as a soloist, guest, and bandleader. In that same year (2013), he collaborated with bassist Fiorenzo Bodrato, drummer Massimiliano Furia, and guitarist Andrea Massaria on "Bartleby the Scrivener for Evil Rabbit", as well as bassist Robert Caon and drummer Marco Carlesso on "Three Open Rooms on Caligola." In the following year of 2014, he released a ballad collection named Anything Your Little Heart Says with Rabbia and bassist Giovanni Maier. In 2015, he and Rabbia, along with guitarist and electronic musician Evivind Arset, released In Memoriam. In 2016, Battaglia worked with German reedist Ulrich Drechsler and released a duo album Little Peace Lullaby, and worked with guitarist Samo Salamon to release Winds.

== Playing Style ==
Battaglia started off playing baroque music written by Bach, Scarlatti, and Handel, as well as modern music written by Hindemith, Boulez Messiaen, and Ligeti. However, he has since then experimented and wrote works in genres such as ECM style jazz, avant-garde jazz, chamber jazz, modern creative, as well as modern classical.

He makes full usage of the percussive and rhythmic possibilities of the piano, and by drawing on his Italian heritage, he incorporates a unique use of sounds and timbres, as well as melody vocation, which is reflective of the romantic style. He has often by remarked as a "rare artist who plays with fearless freedom and meaningful passion," and that he embodies the soul of "modern jazz and contemporary classical music."

He has described how he views music, as a "universal metalanguage, a place which is genuinely without boundaries, not just in words but in fact, where my music or others' music does not exist, solely music."

== Teaching career ==
Since 1988, he has been teaching at the Siena Jazz summer program, where he teaches improvisation techniques for the three-year course and the two-year course of Siena Jazz University. He has also been conducting Laboratorio Permanente do Ricerca Musicale since 1996, a workshop on musical research, improvisation, composition, and creation in music. Since 2018, he has been teaching at the Accademia Chigiana and directs the Tabula Rasa project of the Chigiana Siena Jazz Ensemble. Battaglia is a founder of the jazz group Triplicity and Theatrum as part of the Permanent Workshop for Musical Research in Siena.

Since 2004, he has been recording as a leader for the ECM Records, with important work on the CD focusing on the Raccolto, Re: Pasolini, Pastorale, the River of Anyder, Songways, and Pelagos.

== Discography ==
=== As leader ===
Year recorded	Title	Label	Personnel/Notes
1987	Things Ain't What They Used to Be	Splasc(h)	Trio, with Piero Leveratto (bass), Gianni Cazzola (drums)
1988	Auryn	Splasc(h)	Trio, with Paolino Dalla Porta (bass), Manhu Roche (drums)
1990	Explore	Splasc(h)	Duo, with Tony Oxley (drums)
1991	Confession	Splasc(h)	Trio, with Paolino Dalla Porta (bass), Roberto Gatto (drums)
1992	Bill Evans Compositions, Vol. 1	Splasc(h)	Trio, with Paolino Dalla Porta (bass), Aldo Romano (drums)
1993	Bill Evans Compositions, Vol. 2	Splasc(h)	Trio, with Paolino Dalla Porta (bass), Aldo Romano (drums)
1993	Sulphur	Splasc(h)	Trio, with Paolino Dalla Porta (bass), Tony Oxley (drums)
1993	Baptism	Splasc(h)	Solo piano
1993	Life of a Petal	Splasc(h)	Solo piano
1995	Unknown Flames: Live in Siena	Splasc(h)	Trio, with Paolino Dalla Porta (bass), Roberto Gatto (drums); in concert
1997	Rito Stagionale	Splasc(h)	
1997	Gesti	Splasc(h)	
1997	Mut(e)azioni	Splasc(h)	
1997	Omen	Splasc(h)	Duo, with Pierre Favre (percussion)
1997	Ecumenica: The Swiss Radio Tapes 1	Splasc(h)	Solo piano
1997	Musica Centripeta: The Swiss Radio Tapes 2	Splasc(h)	Solo piano
2003	Raccolto	ECM	One CD trio, with Giovanni Maier (double bass), Michele Rabbia (percussion); one CD trio with Dominique Pifarély (violin), Rabbia (percussion)
2005	Re: Pasolini	ECM	One CD with Aya Shimura (cello), Salvatore Maiore (bass), Roberto Dani (drums), Mirco Mariottini (clarinet), Michael Gassmann (trumpet); one CD with Dominique Pifarély (violin), Vincent Courtois (cello), Bruno Chevillon (double bass), Michele Rabbia (percussion)
2009	Pastorale	ECM	Duo, with Michele Rabbia (percussion, electronics)
2009	The River of Anyder	ECM	Trio, with Salvatore Maiore (bass), Roberto Dani (drums)
2012	Songways	ECM	Trio, with Salvatore Maiore (bass), Roberto Dani (percussion)
2014	In the Morning: Music of Alec Wilder	ECM	Trio, with Salvatore Maiore (bass), Roberto Dani (drums); in concert
2015	windS	Klopotec	Duo, with Samo Šalamon (guitar); in concert
2016	Pelagos	ECM	Solo piano; some tracks in concert
