= Médéric Collignon =

French jazz musician

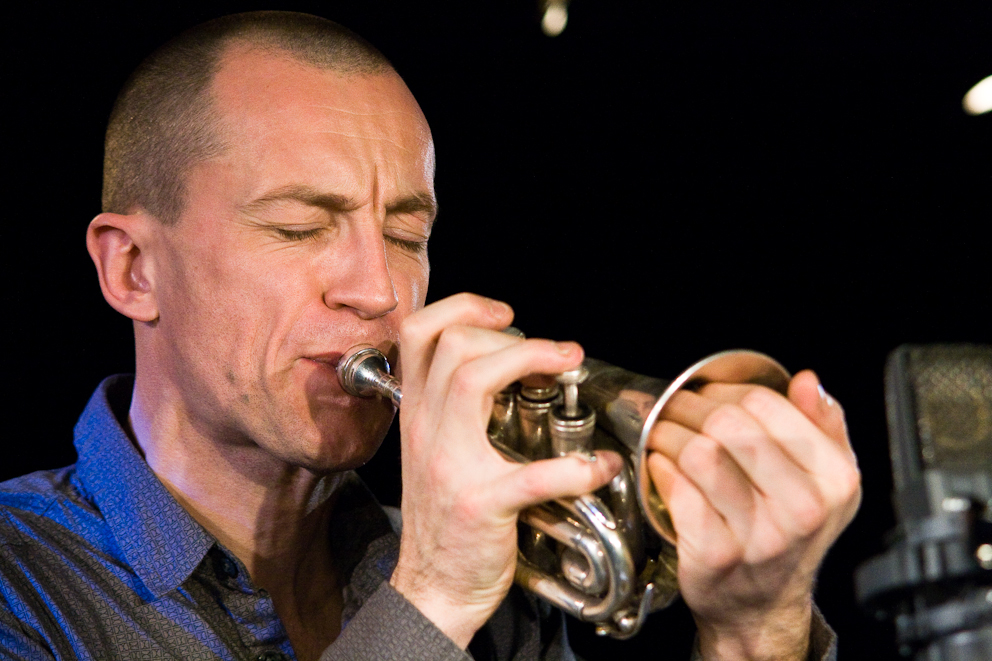
- Médéric Collignon on stage at Le Triton (Les Lilas, 93 - France) in December 2008

Background information
- Born: July 6, 1970 (age 54); Villers-Semeuse, Ardennes, France
- Genres: Jazz
- Occupation(s): Vocalist, instrumentalist
- Instrument(s): Cornet, saxhorn, mini korg
- Years active: 1989–present
- Website: www.myspace.com/medericollignofficial

Médéric Collignon (born 6 July 1970 in Villers-Semeuse, Ardennes) is a French jazz vocalist, cornettist and saxhorn player.

He learnt to play the trumpet at the age of five, became a pupil at the Conservatoire de Charleville-Mézières in 1984, and gained his diploma at the Conservatoire de Nancy in 1989. In 2009 he was awarded the Django Reinhardt prize by the Académie du Jazz.

He has been influenced by various genres, including funk, hard rock, jazz-rock and the music of Olivier Messiaen.

== Discography ==
=== As leader ===
- 2006 Porgy and Bess, Discograph
- 2010 Shangri-Tunkashi-La, Plus Loin Music
- 2012 À la recherche du roi frippé, Just Looking

=== As sideman ===
- 2001 Sereine, Label Bleu, with Claude Barthélémy
- 2003 Admirabelamour, Label Bleu, with the Orchestre national de jazz conducted by Claude Barthélémy
- 2003 Napoli's Walls, ECM, with Louis Sclavis
- 2005 "Lunfardo", record label Chief Inspector (200509), Sébastien Gaxie
- 2007 Bamana, Act Music, with Soriba Kouyaté
