= L'Imparfait des Langues =

L'imparfait des Langues

Studio album by Louis Sclavis
- Released: 2007
- Recorded: April 2005
- Studio: Studios la Buissonne; Pernes-les-Fontaines
- Genre: Avant-garde jazz
- Length: 56:03
- Label: ECM; ECM 1954
- Producer: Manfred Eicher, Louis Sclavis

Louis Sclavis chronology
African Flashback (2005)	L'imparfait des Langues (2007)	Lost on the Way (2009)

Professional ratings
Review scores
Source	Rating
All About Jazz	4.5/5 stars
AllMusic	4/5 stars
The Guardian	5/5 stars
The Penguin Guide to Jazz Recordings	4/4 stars

L'imparfait des langues ("The Imperfection of Language") is an album by French jazz musician Louis Sclavis, recorded in April 2005 and released by ECM in 2007, his fifth for this label, and twelfth overall.

== Background ==
Sclavis had received a commission to premiere a new project at the Monaco Festival Le Printemps des Arts in Monte Carlo, in April 2005. Having put together an ensemble, Sclavis sketched the compositions for L'imparfait des langues in ten days. The concert was cancelled at short notice due to the death of Monaco's Prince Rainier. Without a venue, Sclavis and his group booked into a recording studio in Pernes-les-Fontaines and recorded the music in a single day.

== Music ==
Sclavis was keen to challenge his compositional habits and brought together an ensemble with which he had had little previous experience. The players were not "pure jazz", but worked in many different styles of music. Structurally, many of the pieces are based on short 8 or 16-bar phrases and equal emphasis is placed on texture and sound as well as melody. The album has a wide textural diversity, from the "aggressive improvisation" of "L'idée du dialecte" and the Sonic Youth-style overdriven guitar of Maxime Delpierre's "Convocation" to the heavily processed vocals of "Annonce" and the repetitive "Le verbe."

== Track listing ==
All compositions by Louis Sclavis, except "Premier imparfait «a»" and "Premier imparfait «b»" by Louis Sclavis and Paul Brousseau and "Convocation" by Maxime Delpierre.

1. "Premier imparfait «a»" – 1:46
2. "L'idée du dialecte" – 6:57
3. "Premier imparfait «b»" – 1:01
4. "Le verbe" – 6:42
5. "Dialogue with a dream" – 3:59
6. "Annonce" – 1:40
7. "Archéologie" – 6:12
8. "Deuxieme imparfait" – 2:16
9. "Convocation" – 1:16
10. "Palabre" – 4:00
11. "Le longs du temps" – 5:30
12. "L'écrit sacrifié" – 2:25
13. "Story of a phrase" – 7:32
14. "L'imparfait des langues" – 3:57

== Personnel ==
- Louis Sclavis – clarinet, bass clarinet, soprano saxophone
- Marc Baron – alto saxophone
- Paul Brousseau – keyboards, sampling, electronics, guitar
- Maxime Delpierre – guitar
- François Merville – drums
