= Sandy Amerio =

French film director

- Born: October 4, 1973 (age 52); Paris, France
- Occupation(s): Film director, visual artist, researcher, writer

Sandy Amerio (born October 4, 1973) is a film director, visual artist, researcher and writer.

== Early life and education ==
Sandy Amerio was born in Paris, France, and grew up in several northern suburbs of Paris. She studied art at the ESAD de Reims from 1994 to 1995, then pursued video studies at the école supérieure des beaux-arts de Nantes Métropole from 1996 to 1999, and film directing at Le Fresnoy–Studio National des Arts Contemporains from 2000 to 2002.

== Career ==
In her first film, Surfing on (our) History (2000), Amerio confronted her family with its own image. The film developed contemporary drama themes such as a loss of grip on History. Annick Peigné-Giuly of Libération described it as "a very clever answer to the question often asked in the documentary: is my life a novel?"

Her second film, Waiting Time /Romania (2001), also features non-actors playing themselves in Romania.

In 2004, Amerio introduced a business storytelling concept in France with her film Hear Me, Children-Yet-to-Be-Born (2004), featuring Nancye Ferguson, James C.Burns, and Black Sifichi as voice-over in a Death Valley corporate tale. In the film, a manager tells a story that occurred during his last business trip to the Dead Sea with the aim of laying off the employees who listen to him. The same year, she published her first book on business storytelling, including texts from American storytellers such as Rosabeth Moss Kanter, Doug Stevenson, and Diana Hartley.

Between 2008 and 2010, she collaborated with French writer Patrick Bouvet on the reading and audiovisual performance Wandering Souls. The project combined poetical texts, graphic works, and music, examining how the United States constructed internal and external enemies across history, from the Second World War to the present day, through various media including horror films and amateur videos.

Amerio also works on stage, performing her own texts accompanied by experimental musician Jean-Marc Montera (Director of the GRIM in Marseille). An album, called L'Hôtesse, was released in 2011.

Between 2010 and 2012, Amerio investigated reality and fiction concepts, initiating the Restage Replay Reload creation process with Japanese World War II reenactor Hiroki Nakazato. She directed and edited the movie DRAGOONED, a documentary on hardcore reenactment practice, presented at the 63rd Berlin International Film Festival (Forum Expanded).

== Artistic approach ==
Sandy Amerio primarily works in film, while also engaging in writing, performance, sound, and photography. Her work investigates contemporary social and cultural phenomena, often through an anthropological lens and narrative experiments. According to the New Media Encyclopedia – Centre Pompidou, "Her research relates to the signs emitted by our contemporary societies. With an anthropological approach and through narratives, she focuses on elements of reality, which she questions, by inventing protocols that enable distanciation, creating aesthetic, theoretical, and poetic connections."
