= Bow River Falls =

Studio album by Dave Douglas
- Released: 2004
- Recorded: June, 2003 in Banff, Alberta
- Genre: Jazz
- Length: 58:27
- Label: Koch
- Producer: Dave Douglas

Dave Douglas chronology
| Strange Liberation (2004) | Bow River Falls (2004) | Mountain Passages (2005) |

Bow River Falls is the 22nd album by trumpeter Dave Douglas. It was released on the Koch label in 2004 and features performances by Douglas, Louis Sclavis, Peggy Lee, and Dylan van der Schyff.

== Reception ==
Professional ratings
Review scores
| Source | Rating |
|---|---|
| Allmusic | 4/5 stars |
| The Penguin Guide to Jazz Recordings | 3.5/4 stars |

The Allmusic review by Matt Collar awarded the album 4 stars stating "Bow River Falls is a highly rewarding listen and ranks with the best of Douglas' recordings". On All About Jazz Sean Patrick Fitzell said "The colors and textures assembled on Bow River Falls reflect its diverse cast and the flowing results suggest that the musicians found common ground to communicate. Hopefully, this will be an auspicious start for continuing collaboration". In JazzTimes, Aaron Steinberg wrote "Having so many distinctive composers on hand, Douglas splits the program between tunes by himself, Lee and Sclavis. It's great fun hearing the band go at one another's instantly recognizable themes. Lee's music focuses on texture and serves as atmospheric interludes between Sclavis' and Douglas' playful, melodic music".

== Track listing ==
All compositions by Dave Douglas except as indicated

1. "Blinks" (Lacy) - 2:32
2. "Bow River Falls" - 5:12
3. "Fete Forraine" (Sclavis) - 5:12
4. "Window" (Lee) - 4:24
5. "Maputo" (Sclavis) - 7:08
6. "Petals" - 5:19
7. "Retracing 2" (Lee) - 6:37
8. "Dernier Regards/Vol" (Sclavis) - 3:02
9. "Woman at Point Zero" - 8:16
10. "Dark Water" (Douglas, Lee, Sclavis, van der Schyff) - 5:22
11. "Paradox" - 5:23

== Personnel ==
- Dave Douglas: trumpet
- Louis Sclavis: clarinet, bass clarinet
- Peggy Lee: cello
- Dylan van der Schyff: drums, laptop
