= Freak In =

Studio album by Dave Douglas
- Released: 2003
- Recorded: July–December 2002
- Genre: Electronic jazz; electroacoustic; sound collage
- Label: RCA Bluebird
- Producer: Dave Douglas

Dave Douglas chronology
The Infinite (2002)	Freak In (2003)	Strange Liberation (2003)

Freak In is the 20th album by trumpeter Dave Douglas. It was released on the RCA Bluebird label in 2003 and features performances by Douglas, Jamie Saft, Marc Ribot, Karsh Kale, Joey Baron, Romero Lubambo, Brad Jones, Ikue Mori, Seamus Blake, Chris Speed, Craig Taborn, Michael Sarin, with Stephanie Stone contributing vocals on one track.

Following his post-bop effort Infinite (2002), Freak In saw Douglas move into an abstract electronic jazz direction, arranging tunes and sound collages from his sextet using computer software with Saft. The album features "early electro-acoustic experimentation". The jazz sound is accompanied by Kale's tabla beats, Mori's "weird sounds" and Ribot's avant-garde guitar work.

== Reception ==
Professional ratings
Review scores
Source	Rating
Allmusic	4/5 stars

The Allmusic review by Dave Lynch awarded the album 4 stars stating "As both player and sole composer, Douglas stands as the unifying force, free to approach the full possibilities of each tune individually, but not at the expense of the overall album's coherence. Quite literally crackling with energy and dense with ideas from the first to the hidden 12th track, Freak In is one of the strongest CDs of his extraordinary career". On All About Jazz Matt Rand stated "For years, Douglas has been involved in all sorts of breaking down and building back up of existing structure. But now Douglas has refined his approach, and has made a record that defines its own style". A reviewer for CMJ New Music Monthly emphasised the unpredictability of Douglas' career and highlighted the "downright abstract" title track, and the "darkly compelling" "Hot Club of the 13th Street", while adding that "Maya" features a "modern angular groove".

== Track listing ==
1. "Freak In" - 3:47
2. "Culver City Park" - 7:19
3. "Black Rock Park" - 4:54
4. "Hot Club Of 13th Street" - 2:12
5. "Eastern Parkway" - 5:36
6. "November" - 5:41
7. "Porto Alegre" - 5:57
8. "The Great Schism" - 4:36
9. "Wild Blue" - 2:59
10. "Maya" - 6:51
11. "Traveler There Is No Road" - 7:54
12. "The Mystic Lamb" - 7:22

All compositions by Dave Douglas

== Personnel ==
- Dave Douglas: trumpet, keyboards, voice
- Seamus Blake: saxophone
- Chris Speed: saxophone, clarinet
- Marc Ribot: electric guitar
- Romero Lubambo: acoustic guitar
- Jamie Saft: keyboards, loops, programming
- Craig Taborn: Fender Rhodes
- Brad Jones: Ampeg baby bass, acoustic bass
- Joey Baron, Michael Sarin: drums
- Karsh Kale: tabla, additional drums
- Ikue Mori: electronic percussion
- Stephanie Stone: vocals (track 7)
