= Baptism (Stefano Battaglia album) =

Studio album by Stefano Battaglia
- Recorded: 5 December 1993
- Studio: Murec Studio, Milan
- Genre: Jazz
- Label: Splasc(h)

Baptism is a solo piano album by Stefano Battaglia. It was recorded in 1993 and released by Splasc(h).

== Recording and music ==
The album of solo piano performances by Battaglia was recorded at Murec Studio in Milan on 5 December 1993. The pieces pay tribute to other pianists in various ways. "Tristano" is a direct tribute to Lennie Tristano; in addition, "Battaglia reaches into the fake books of pianists from Keith Jarrett ('The Golden Bough'), Bill Evans ('Baptism'), and Misha Mengelberg ('Youniverse'), seeking a point where the seams blur and the different stylistic approaches no longer hold sway in the piano's language.

== Release and reception ==
Professional ratings
Review scores
Source	Rating
AllMusic	4.5/5 stars
The Penguin Guide to Jazz	3.5/4 stars

Baptism was released by Splasc(h), as was Life of a Petal, another Battaglia solo piano album from the same year. The AllMusic review described Battaglia's overall approach and effect: "He leaves an obvious skeleton while decorating it with tonal tattoos: themes and motifs that come from the inside and move to the surface, all the while using his remarkable technical facility to transform his historical and linguistic subjects into newly created sonic paintings of tender, moving beauty." The Penguin Guide to Jazz commented that "Observe" and "Requiem Pour Renée Daumal" are "the work of a very singular imagination altogether."

== Track listing ==
1. "Tristano" – 4:09
2. "Baptism" – 3:55
3. "Transmutation" – 2:35
4. "The Golden Bough" – 4:20
5. "Bluesiana" – 6:11
6. "Streams" – 2:21
7. "The Chant" – 2:33
8. "Observe" – 6:00
9. "Singularities" – 3:06
10. "Youniverse" – 4:21
11. "Fugatha" – 4:09
12. "Wish" – 4:01
13. "Requiem Pour Renée Daumal" – 2:53

== Personnel ==
- Stefano Battaglia – piano
