= The River of Anyder =

Studio album by the Stefano Battaglia Trio
- Released: August 26, 2011
- Recorded: November 2009
- Studio: Auditorio Radiotelevisione Svizzera; Lugano, Switzerland
- Genre: Jazz
- Length: 79:09
- Label: ECM; ECM 2151
- Producer: Manfred Eicher

Stefano Battaglia chronology
Pastorale (2010)	The River of Anyder (2011)	Songways (2013)

Professional ratings
Review scores
Source	Rating
Allmusic	4/5 stars

The River of Anyder is a jazz album by the Stefano Battaglia Trio, recorded in November 2009 and released on ECM in August 2011. The trio features Battaglia on piano, Salvatore Maiore on bass and Roberto Dani on drums.

== Track listing ==
All compositions by Stefano Battaglia.

1. "Minas Tirith" – 7:32
2. "The River of Anyder" – 7:00
3. "Ararat Dance" – 8:48
4. "Return to Bensalem" – 7:40
5. "Nowhere Song" – 2:18
6. "Sham–bha–lah" – 15:00
7. "Bensalem" – 12:13
8. "Anagoor" – 11:07
9. "Ararat Prayer" – 6:20
10. "Anywhere Song" – 1:11

== Personnel ==
- Stefano Battaglia – piano
- Salvatore Maiore – bass
- Roberto Dani – drums
