= Songways =

Studio album by Stefano Battaglia Trio
- Released: March 5, 2013
- Recorded: April 2012
- Studio: Auditorio Radiotelevisione Svizzera; Lugano, Switzerland
- Genre: Jazz
- Length: 78:03
- Label: ECM; ECM 2286
- Producer: Manfred Eicher

Stefano Battaglia chronology
The River of Anyder (2011)	Songways (2013)

Songways is an album by the Stefano Battaglia Trio, featuring Battaglia on piano Salvatore Maiore on bass and Roberto Dani on percussion, recorded in April 2012 and released on ECM the following year.

== Reception ==
Professional ratings
Review scores
Source	Rating
AllMusic	4/5 stars
PopMatters	9/10 stars

The AllMusic review by Thom Jurek awarded the album 4 stars stating "Songways is European jazz rooted deep in the Italian tradition: it wears both its classicism and post-vanguard lyricism plainly, in the process creating a deft, instinctive, and highly expressionistic music."

The PopMatters review by John Garratt stated "Songways is amorphously terrific. It may not be a jazz or classical release, but it’s one of 2013’s best so far."

The All About Jazz review by John Kelman said that "Songways capitalizes on the strength of a trio that's been honing its craft in multiple contexts for eight years, finding beauty in every nook and cranny even as it eschews the obvious, and continues to hone its profoundly lyrical language with music that paints vivid pictures and evokes cinematic landscapes, encouraging the imagination to run where it will."

The JazzTimes review by Thomas Conrad said "Songways is one of the prettiest piano trio albums of the new millennium... In jazz, “pretty” is often an adjective that damns with faint praise. Battaglia's music is pretty but neither shallow nor soft."

== Track listing ==
All compositions by Stefano Battaglia

1. "Euphonia Elegy" - 12:11
2. "Ismaro" - 5:09
3. "Vondervotteimittis" - 7:22
4. "Armonia" - 13:50
5. "Mildendo Wide Song" - 6:08
6. "Monte Analogo" - 6:51
7. "Abdias" - 3:40
8. "Songways" - 8:42
9. "Perla" - 5:17
10. "Babel Hymn" - 8:52

== Personnel ==
- Stefano Battaglia — piano
- Salvatore Maiore — double bass
- Roberto Dani — percussion
