= Raccolto =

Studio album by Stefano Battaglia
- Released: 2005
- Recorded: September and December 2003
- Genre: Jazz
- Length: 104:48
- Label: ECM; ECM 1933/34
- Producer: Manfred Eicher

Stefano Battaglia chronology
Stravagario 2 (2005)	Raccolto (2005)	Re: Pasolini (2007)

Raccolto is an album by Italian pianist Stefano Battaglia recorded in September and December 2003 and released on ECM in 2005.

== Reception ==
The AllMusic review by Thom Jurek awarded the album 4 stars stating "Milanese pianist and composer Stefano Battaglia has walked on both sides of the classical and jazz street with ease and comfort... he performs in two different settings to illustrate his tremendous gifts as both an improviser and a composer... Disc one showcases Battaglia in a jazz trio setting... Here, lush lyricism folds into free improvisation... The second disc in this collection features Rabbia and Battaglia with violinist Dominique Pifarély, a member of Louis Sclavis' group. These 12 tunes are full of bracing improvisations and textural tension... The two discs together are all but irresistible to fans of the new European music."

Professional ratings
Review scores
Source	Rating
Allmusic	4/5 stars
The Penguin Guide to Jazz Recordings	3.5/4 stars

== Track listing ==
Disc One:

All compositions by Stefano Battaglia except as indicated

1. "Raccolto" – 5:43
2. "Triangolazioni" – 14:42
3. "Triosonic I" (Stefano Battaglia, Giovanni Maier, Michele Rabbia) – 3:47
4. "All Is Language" (Battaglia, Maier, Rabbia) – 11:01
5. "Our Circular Song" (Battaglia, Maier, Rabbia) – 4:25
6. "Coro" – 4:24
7. "Trisonic II" (Battaglia, Maier, Rabbia) – 1:22
8. "In Front of the Fourth Door" (Battaglia, Maier, Rabbia) – 4:33
9. "L'Osservanza" – 4:21

Disc Two:

All compositions by Stefano Battaglia, Dominique Pifarély and Michele Rabbia except as indicated

1. "Lys" – 5:02
2. "Canto I (Dell'agonia della terra)" – 4:11
3. "Riconoscenza" – 4:05
4. "Réminiscence pour violon et piano" (Battaglia, Pifarély) – 4:09
5. "Pourquoi?" – 3:47
6. "Il circo ungherese" – 3:27
7. "Veritas" – 1:55
8. "Velario de marzo" (Battaglia, Pifarély) – 5:04
9. "Recitativo in memoria di Luciano Berio" – 5:40
10. "Canto II (Dell'agonia dei cieli)" – 3:01
11. "Trois brouillons" – 6:02
12. "...Dulci declinant lumina somno..." – 3:53

- Recorded at Artesuono Recording Studio in Udine, Italy in September and December 2003

== Personnel ==
- Stefano Battaglia – piano
- Dominique Pifarély – violin (Disc Two)
- Giovanni Maier – double bass (Disc One)
- Michele Rabbia – percussion
