= Pelagos (album) =

Studio album / Live album by Stefano Battaglia
- Released: 15 September 2017
- Recorded: May 2016
- Venue: Fazioli Concert Hall; Sacile, Italy
- Genre: Jazz
- Label: ECM; ECM 2570/71
- Producer: Manfred Eicher

Stefano Battaglia chronology
windS (2015)	Pelagos (2017)

Pelagos is a solo double album by Italian classical and jazz pianist Stefano Battaglia, recorded in May 2016 and released on ECM September 15, 2017—Battaglia's seventh release for the label.

== Background ==
The theme of the album is "the suffering countries of the Mediterranean and Balkan areas." For the two days before the recording, Battaglia was in a monastery, "meditating upon the meaning of migration."

=== Recording and music ===
The album of solo piano performances by Battaglia was recorded at the Fazioli Concert Hall in Sacile, Italy in May 2016. Two sessions were recorded at the same venue—one with an audience and one without. Some of the pieces include playing on a prepared piano.

Approximately four hours of music were recorded. Producer Manfred Eicher selected around two hours of playing for release. Of the tracks, five ("Pelagos", "Halap", "Exilium", "Migration Mantra" and "Ufratu") are Battaglia compositions, eleven are improvisations and one is a traditional Arabic song, "Lama Bada Yatathanna", that is performed twice. Applause was cut from the recording, so does not appear on the album.

Some of the track titles are in keeping with the album's theme: "Lampedusa" is an Italian island where migrant boats from Libya landed. "Horgos e Roszke" are towns on the Hungary–Serbia border. "Exilium" means "exile" in Latin; while "Destino" is Italian for "destiny". The first of these four is an improvisation; "Crushed notes, in pairs, become slowly louder, in protest or simply in pain." The second is also an improvisation, played quietly. The final two "are founded on a few dark repeating left-hand chords like knells of finality, from which Battaglia's right hand seeks release in markings upon silence, in isolated notes that gather to bare melodies." Additionally, "Ufratu" is named after the Euphrates.

== Reception ==
The JazzTimes reviewer believed that this was the best of Battaglia's ECM recordings: "Pelagos is an achievement of extraordinary depth, realized through an extraordinary range of artistic means."

== Track listing ==
Disc one
No.	Title	Length
1.	"Destino"
2.	"Pelagos"
3.	"Migralia"
4.	"Lamma Bada Yatathanna"
5.	"Processional"
6.	"Halap"
7.	"Dogon"
8.	"Life"

Disc two
No.	Title	Length
1.	"Lampedusa"
2.	"Hora Mundi"
3.	"Lamma Bada Yatathanna"
4.	"Exilium"
5.	"Migration Mantra"
6.	"Horgos e Roszke"
7.	"Ufratu"
8.	"Heron"
9.	"Brenner Toccata"

- Tracks drawn from the concert performance are: 1, 3–6, 8 (CD1); 2, 4, 5, 8 (CD2)

== Personnel ==
- Stefano Battaglia – piano
