= Lost on the Way =

Studio album by Louis Sclavis
- Released: 2009
- Recorded: September 2008
- Studio: Théâtre de Saint-Quentin-en-Yvelines; Saint-Quentin-en-Yvelines, France
- Genre: Jazz
- Length: 56:51
- Label: ECM; ECM 2098
- Producer: Manfred Eicher

Louis Sclavis chronology
L'Imparfait des Langues (2007)	Lost on the Way (2009)

Lost on the Way is an album by French clarinetist and composer Louis Sclavis recorded in September 2008 and released on ECM the following year.

== Reception ==
The AllMusic review by Michael G. Nastos awarded the album 4½ stars stating "This is masterpiece among many well-crafted efforts by Sclavis, and comes highly recommended for fans of or newcomers to his extraordinary music."

Professional ratings
Review scores
Source	Rating
Allmusic	4.5/5 stars

== Track listing ==
All compositions by Louis Sclavis except as indicated

1. "De Charybde en Scylla" – 5:35
2. "La Première Île" (Olivier Lété, Sclavis) – 1:24
3. "Lost on the Way" (Lété, Sclavis) – 6:42
4. "Bain d'Or" – 6:03
5. "Le Sommeil des Sirènes" – 7:23
6. "L 'Heure des Songes" – 4:19
7. "Aboard Ulysses's Boat" – 5:52
8. "Les Doutes du Cyclope" – 6:51
9. "Un Vent Noir" – 3:40
10. "The Last Island" (Lété) – 1:20
11. "Des Bruits à Tisser" – 5:18
12. "L 'Absence" – 2:24

== Personnel ==
- Louis Sclavis – clarinet, soprano saxophone
- Matthias Metzger – soprano saxophone, alto saxophone
- Maxime Delpierre – guitar
- Olivier Lété – bass
- François Merville – drums
