= Dominique Regef =

French musician

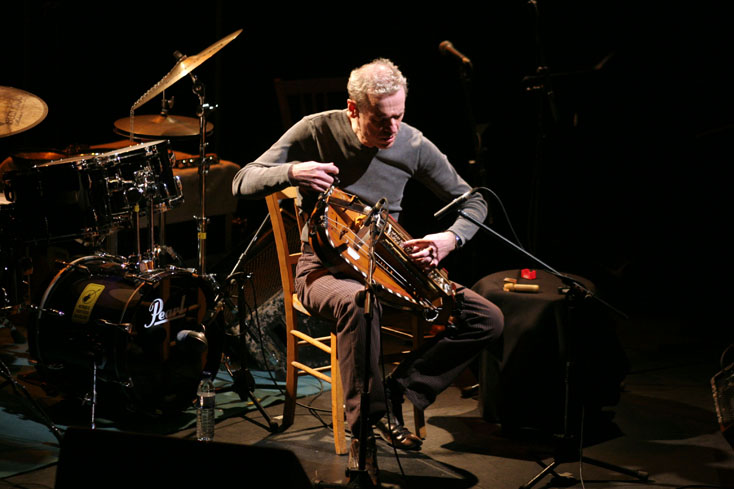
Dominique Regef

Dominique Regef (b. Paris, 1947) is a French improvisor, composer, and musician specializing in stringed instruments: the cello, the rebec, the vièle à archet, and the Rajasthan dilruba. Dominique Regef is recognized as an exceptional soloist on the hurdy-gurdy; he is known for surprising and moving audiences with his sound on the instrument. His concerts, be it a solo recital or a small group performance, shock listeners from all over the world with their originality and their strength. He has performed in several well-known music festivals, including the International Baroque Music Festival, the Jazz à Luz festival and the Grenoble Jazz Festival. He is cited as one of the best examples of modern hurdy-gurdy playing.

His interest in contemporary and improvised music was confirmed after long experimentation and contribution in the world of classical, medieval and traditional music. His first instruments were classical cello and piano. His more traditional work followed a cyclical and organic logic. It made use of the element of brute strength and sonority as an essential part of his musical conversations. In reviews of his solo album, Eight Magazine claimed that Regef has "transformed an instrument of antiquity into something utterly contemporary," while the Wire remarked that he "creates an intense soundscape of whirling strings, buzzing drones, and strident polyphonic effects akin to an electronic keyboard."

== Collaborations ==
Dominique Regef has collaborated with the following artists: Michel Doneda, Lê Quan Ninh, Daunik Lazro, Beñat Achiary, Evan Parker, Joëlle Léandre, Equidad Bares, Pascal Contet, Carlos Zingaro, Otomo Yoshihide, Bob Ostertag, Jon Rose, Francès Marie Uitti, Jean-Marc Montera, Rosina de Pèira, Mighela Cesari, Philippe Maté, Rémy Walter, Jean-François Méchali, Michel Marre, Jacques Di Donato, Didier Petit, Gérard Zuchetto, Stephan Eicher, Steve Waring, Pierre Jodlowsky and György Kurtag Junior, among others

He has also worked with the following choreographers: Michel Raji, Emmanuel Grivet, Heddy Maalem and Marceline Lartigue, among others.

Finally, he has worked with the following poets and playwrights : Serge Pey, Thierry Bédart, Anne Lefèvre, Denis Podalydès and Peter Brook, among others.

== Discography ==
=== Solo Album ===
- 1993:Tourneries

=== Collaborations ===
- 1970: Special Instrumental Guitar, with Steve Waring
- 1979: Le Bestiaire, with Malicorne
- 1979: Un bal Renaissance, with Mélusine and La Maurache
- 1988: Chemins Ibériques, with Equidad Bares
- 1988: Musique liturgique et profane du XIV siècle, with Toulouse Medieval Ensemble
- 1988: Arranoa, with Beñat Achiary
- 1991: Trobar e cantar, with Gérard Zuchetto
- 1991: Lili Purprea, with Beñat Achiary
- 1992: L'élémentaire sonore, with Michel Doneda
- 1992: SOC, with Michel Doneda and Lê Quan Ninh
- 1993: Anuèit, with Rosina de Pèira
- 1993: U cantu prufondu, with Mighela Cesari
- 1993: Kaskasnikola, with Ziskakan
- 1993: Carcassonne, with Stephan Eicher
- 1994: Non ci badar...guarda et passa, with Stephan Eicher
- 1994: Face to the Ground, with Rémy Walter
- 1994: L'ampleur des dégâts, with Eric Lareine
- 1995: Ballade pour une mer qui chante Vol.2, with Les Vents D'Est
- 1995: L'évangile du serpent, with Serge Pey
- 1996: La symphonnie indien, with Mythia - Ravi Prasad
- 1996: Système Friche
- 1998: Emotions, with Philippe Matté
- 2000: Concept, with Troubadours Art Ensemble
- 2000: Trob'art, with Troubadours Art Ensemble
- 2000: Open the Door, with Rodger Hodson
- 2001: Concepts 2, with Troubadours Art Ensemble
- 2001: OCCITANIA
- 2001: Indians Gavachs, with Michel Marre
- 2001: Renaissance, with Philippe Eidel
- 2002: Douce Amie - Chansons de Trouvères, with Millenarium
- 2003: Trobada, with Trobada

== See also ==
- Valentin Clastrier
- French folk music
- Music of Limousin
