= Jean-Marc Montera =

French guitarist

Jean-Marc Montera is a French guitarist, mainly active in the experimental music scene. Besides being active as a musician, he's also the director of the organisation GRIM, that organises concerts, festivals, workshops and artist in residence projects in Marseille.

Montera is active as a player since the 1970s and has undertaken collaborations with musicians such as Fred Frith, André Jaume, Barre Phillips, Yves Robert, Loren Mazzacane Connors, Thurston Moore, Lee Ranaldo, Louis Sclavis, Hifiklub, Michel Doneda. And in the theater, dance and visual art scenes with people including Sarah Kane, Biljana Srbljanović, Jean-Claude Berutti, Odile Duboc, Sandy Amerio. In 1978 he raised the organisation GRIM (Groupe de recherche et d'improvisation musicales, roughly translated: Group of Search and Musical Improvisation) of which is the director up until present time.

In 2001 he started an ensemble 'Treatise' de Cornelius Cardew with Chris Cutler (ex-Henry Cow), Thomas Lehn and Hélène Breschand. In 2006 he performed in a guitar trio with Noël Akchoté and Jean-François Pauvros.

== Discography (incomplete) ==
- Naxos (with Barre Phillips und Claudia Phillips), 1987
- Tavagna Group with André Jaume and Rémi Charmasson: Piazza di Luna, 1989
- Unlike, 1990
- Paolo Daminani Ensemble: Song tong, 1991
- HumaNoise congress, 1992
- Christine Wodrascka Quartet: Transkei, 1994
- Hang Around Shout, 1995 (live);
- Gianni Gebbia, Miriam Palma, Vittorio Villa: Terra arsa, 1996
- Improvvisazioni Quartetto (with Mike Cooper, Mauro Orselli and Eugenio Sanna), 1997
- Smiles from Jupiter, Soloalbum, 1998
- King Übü Örchestrü: Trigger zone, 1998
- MMMR, 1998 (with Lee Ranaldo, Thurston Moore, Loren Mazzacane Connors);
- NOT, 1999 (with Érik M and Michel Doneda);
- Smiles From Jupiter, 2000
- Roman, 2004 (with Louis Sclavis);
- L'Hôtesse (with Sandy Amerio)

=== Other contributions ===
- Fred Frith and François-Michel Pesenti: Helter Skelter (1992)
- Fred Frith: Stone, Brick, Glass, Wood, Wire (1999)

== Soundtrack for movie ==
- 2010 : Alter ego, film by Jérôme Nunes.
