= Life of a Petal =

1993 album of jazz piano music by Stefano Battaglia

Studio album by Stefano Battaglia
- Recorded: 5 December 1993
- Studio: Murec Studio, Milan
- Genre: Jazz
- Label: Splasc(h)

Life of a Petal is a solo piano album by Stefano Battaglia. It was recorded in 1993 and released by Splasc(h).

== Recording and music ==
The album of solo piano performances by Battaglia was recorded at Murec Studio in Milan on 5 December 1993. Various harmonic structures are prevalent in his playing: "Making original use of arpeggiated scalar devices and intervallic structural shifts (cascading a skein of chords tonally from E♭ through to A♭^{7} while playing all the tones between on the left hand as the right hand builds scales from each half tone in 9/8 time is a common one) gives Battaglia room to juxtapose stylistic considerations not only from jazz but European classical musical as well".

== Release and reception ==
Professional ratings
Review scores
Source	Rating
AllMusic	4.5/5 stars
The Penguin Guide to Jazz	3/4 stars

Life of a Petal was released by Splasc(h), as was Baptism, another Battaglia solo piano album from the same year. The AllMusic review concluded: "this is a physical record with spiritual undertones, a perfect mirror for Baptism in that it shows Battaglia's mettle as both the most inventive pianist of his generation in Italy [...] and his truly eloquent compositional language." The Penguin Guide to Jazz commented that the pieces "often seem to be seeking an individual point that never arrives."

== Track listing ==
1. "Poem Pour Rûmî" – 3:51
2. "Tell Me What It Is" – 3:50
3. "Etude" – 6:11
4. "Eldila" – 2:20
5. "Blowed" – 5:29
6. "Recitative" – 3:22
7. "Tatum" – 3:03
8. "Life of a Petal" – 4:16
9. "Magnetic Love Field" – 3:01
10. "Taste" – 3:18
11. "Vision" – 3:35
12. "Hymn" – 5:31

== Personnel ==
- Stefano Battaglia – piano
