= Pastorale (album) =

Studio album by Stefano Battaglia and Michele Rabbia
- Released: 2010
- Recorded: March 2009
- Studio: Artesuono Studio; Udine, Italy
- Genre: Jazz; contemporary classical music
- Length: 61:17
- Label: ECM; ECM 2120
- Producer: Manfred Eicher

Stefano Battaglia chronology
Re: Pasolini (2007)	Pastorale (2010)	The River of Anyder (2011)

Pastorale is an album by Italian pianist Stefano Battaglia with Michele Rabbia on electronics and percussion recorded in March 2009 and released on ECM the following year.

== Reception ==
The All About Jazz review by John Kelman said that "An album of contrasting dark thoughts and brighter ideations, the masterful Pastorale strikes an almost immediate subconscious chord. Resonating on a deep level, it's Battaglia's purest, most vividly evocative—and provocative—album to date."

The Independent's Phil Johnson said "The spare, nuanced music is as close to John Cage or Morton Feldman as it is to jazz, but despite the limited instrumentation a great variety of sound is conjured up."

== Track listing ==
All compositions by Stefano Battaglia and Michele Rabbia except where noted.

1. "Antifona Libera (A Enzo Bianchi)" (Battaglia) – 6:28
2. "Metaphysical Consolations" – 5:59
3. "Monasterium" – 3:55
4. "Oracle" – 2:28
5. "Kursk Requiem" – 3:58
6. "Cantar del Alma" – 8:05
7. "Spirits of Myths" – 4:50
8. "Pastorale" – 7:00
9. "Sundance in Balkh" (Battaglia) – 5:50
10. "Tanztheater (In Memory of Pina Bausch)" – 9:48
11. "Vessel of Magic" – 2:56

== Personnel ==
- Stefano Battaglia – prepared piano
- Michele Rabbia – percussion, electronics
