= Napoli's Walls =

Studio album by Louis Sclavis
- Released: 2003
- Recorded: December 2002
- Studio: Studios la Buissonne; Pernes-les-Fontaines
- Genre: Jazz
- Length: 60:03
- Label: ECM; ECM 1857
- Producer: Manfred Eicher

Louis Sclavis chronology
Dans la Nuit (2000)	Napoli's Walls (2003)	African Flashback (2005)

Napoli's Walls is an album by French clarinetist Louis Sclavis recorded in December 2002 and released on ECM the following year.

== Reception ==
The AllMusic review by Thom Jurek awarded the album 4 stars stating "this record is full of sensual pleasure and an utterly accessible, often deeply moving articulation of a new musical language."

In JazzTimes, Aaron Steinberg wrote:

"If you're curious about Sclavis' work as a leader, a great place to start would be the Frenchman's latest recording, the particularly pungent Napoli's Walls. Between 1987 and 1995, French painter Ernest Pignon-Ernest wandered around the Italian city of Naples, literally applying his artwork to the walls of the city. Pignon-Ernest's scenes depicting suffering and pain in a stark, classical style inspired Sclavis to form a new group and write new music in response. Sclavis has shown a particular talent for putting together remarkable bands tailored to specific projects, and this is no exception."

Professional ratings
Review scores
Source	Rating
Allmusic	4/5 stars

== Track listing ==
All compositions by Louis Sclavis except as indicated

1. "Colleur de nuit" – 10:38
2. "Napoli's Walls" – 7:22
3. "Mercè" – 3:03
4. "Kennedy in Napoli" – 6:29
5. "Divinazione moderna I" – 3:34
6. "Divinazione moderna II" – 3:35
7. "Guetteur d'inaperçu" – 8:23
8. "Les apparences" – 4:39
9. "Porta segreta" (Vincent Courtois) – 5:07
10. "Il disegno smangiato d'un uomo" – 7:12

== Personnel ==
- Louis Sclavis – clarinet, bass clarinet, soprano saxophone, baritone saxophone
- Médéric Collignon – pocket trumpet, voices, horn, percussion, electronics
- Vincent Courtois – cello, electronics
- Hasse Poulsen – guitar
