= Musica Centripeta: The Swiss Radio Tapes 2 =

Studio album by Stefano Battaglia
- Recorded: 1997
- Genre: Jazz
- Label: Splasc(h)

Musica Centripeta: The Swiss Radio Tapes 2 is a solo piano album by Stefano Battaglia. It was recorded in 1997 and released by Splasc(h).

== Recording and music ==
The album of solo piano performances by Battaglia was recorded for Swiss radio in 1997. "His compositions – many of them spontaneous – take their time, articulating the inner ear of harmonic construction and proceeding to erect little scalar structures that shift and seem to flit by until a number of them are assembled into one large idea."

== Release and reception ==
Professional ratings
Review scores
Source	Rating
AllMusic	4.5/5 stars

Musica Centripeta was released by Splasc(h) in 2000. The AllMusic review concluded that "This second volume must have been a treat to record because, in its elegance and austere grace, it is nothing less than a small masterpiece." AllAboutJazz wrote that "You won't find any hummable tunes on Musica Centripeta, but neither will you find somnolent repetition or forced abstraction. This disc is a serious study of sound, best appreciated with attentive listening and a mind open to creative synthesis."

== Track listing ==
1. "Il Volo Dell'Ibis"
2. "Intessitura"
3. "Pian Del Lago"
4. "Musica Centripeta"
5. "Arca"
6. "Dardo"
7. "Melancholia Generosissima"
8. "Diaram"
9. "Accade"
10. "Madame Blavatsky"
11. "Illusionista"
12. "Limbus"

== Personnel ==
- Stefano Battaglia – piano
