= Helter Skelter (Fred Frith and François-Michel Pesenti album) =

Studio album by Fred Frith and François-Michel Pesenti
- Released: 1992
- Recorded: February 1992
- Studio: Studio Cactus, Marseille, France
- Genre: Experimental, free jazz
- Length: 55:16
- Language: French
- Label: RecRec (Switzerland)
- Producer: Fred Frith

Fred Frith chronology
Live Improvisations (1992)	Helter Skelter (1992)	Quartets (1994)

Helter Skelter is a 1992 rock opera by Fred Frith and François-Michel Pesenti. It was their first collaborative album and was recorded in Marseille, France, in February 1992. The music was composed by Frith, with libretto by Pesenti, and was conducted by Frith and Jean-Marc Montera. Frith and Pesenti do not perform on this album.

== Background ==
In 1990, English multi-instrumentalist, composer and improvisor Fred Frith spent six months in Marseille, France, working with Que d'la Gueule, a group of young unemployed rock musicians. He composed Helter Skelter for them to perform, a rock opera for two sopranos, one contralto and a large electric ensemble. Their style of playing and abilities varied considerably, but Frith found that this was what contributed to the success of the project. He said, "Somehow all their personalities infected the kind of music we ended up making together." To add to the mix, Frith also encouraged them to create and play homemade instruments.

Helter Skelter was billed as an "operatic tragedy", and was first performed in December 1990 at Theatre Toursky in Marseille. Later the work was also performed in Zagreb, Hamburg, St. Brieuc and Paris. The opera was recorded in February 1992 by Christian Noêl at Studio Cactus in Marseille, and later mixed in July 1992 by Benedykt Grodon, Fred Frith and Jean-Marc Montera at Sound Fabrik in Munich using additional material taken from concert performances.

== Reception ==
In his book Plunderphonics, 'pataphysics & pop mechanics: an introduction to musique actuelle, Andrew Jones said that Que d'la Gueule "show themselves to be a powerful ensemble bristling with talent and volatile contradictions", and that in Helter Skelter they "sketch a broad canvas of despair and hope, an urban maelstrom with moments of pure beauty peering through the shards of electroacoustic reality." Jones added that "Listening to [the opera] is like a ride on a subway and a stroll through a bustling market while listening to music on a walkman: striated fragments upon fragments leak through, from Eastern European jigs and dances …, samples of street life, radio broadcasts, plaintive chords arising from the horns, a soprano singer launching into Catalani's La Romance, all layered in an astonishing dense, chaotic mix and anchored by two airtight drummers."

== Track listing ==
Music by Fred Frith, lyrics by François-Michel Pesenti.

Part I: Y'a Pas Quelqu'un Qui Peut M'aider?
No.	Title	Length
1.	"Fingers"	3:08
2.	"Lungs"	4:16
3.	"Guerre 1"	6:02
4.	"Heart"	2:27
5.	"Mirror" / "Dark as a Match"	4:44
6.	"Guerre 2"	1:52
7.	"Habits"	3:23
8.	"Crescent City" / "Agnus Dei"	4:28

Part II: La Salle Des Adieux
No.	Title	Length
9.	"Tais-Toi"	1:51
10.	"Fermer"	3:09
11.	"Sanctus"	3:45
12.	"Tenir"	2:56
13.	"Rends-Moi Mon Argent"	2:52
14.	"Lux Aeterna"	4:24
15.	"Libera Me"	3:05
16.	"Sauve Moi"	2:54

Source: Discogs, liner notes

== Personnel ==
- Fred Frith – conductor
- Jean-Marc Montera – conductor
- Dalila Khatir – soprano vocals
- Danielle Stephan – soprano vocals
- Frederique Wolf-Michaux – contralto vocals

=== Que d'la Gueule ===
- Claude Monteil – soprano saxophone, tuyaux
- Edmond Hosdikian – alto saxophone, tenor saxophone
- Fred Giuliani – samples, klavier
- Kiwi – electric piano, analog synthesizer
- Nadine Laporte – digital synthesizer
- Richard Peter – electric guitar
- Christophe Costabel – electric guitar
- Laurent Luci – electric guitar
- Farid Khenfouf – electric bass
- Denis Cabacho – metal percussions, harmonica, newspapers
- Jean-Christophe Ville – 1-string banjo, melodica, chains, food
- Didier Roth – home-made instruments, tapes, radio, lungs
- Ahmed Compaore – drums
- Mathias Mopty – drums

Source: Discogs, liner notes

== Production ==
- Recorded February 1992 by Christian Noêl at Studio Cactus, Marseille
- Mixed July 1992 by Benedykt Grodon, Fred Frith and Jean-Marc Montera at Sound Fabrik, Munich using additional material taken from performances in Zagreb, Hamburg, St. Brieuc and Paris
- Digital editing by Andy Fuchs at Silent Movie Music, Munich
- Produced by Fred Frith
- Liner notes by Gabriel Vialle
- Photography by Heike Liss
- Design by Peter Bäder

Source: Discogs, liner notes
