= Antoine Bouscatel =

French musician

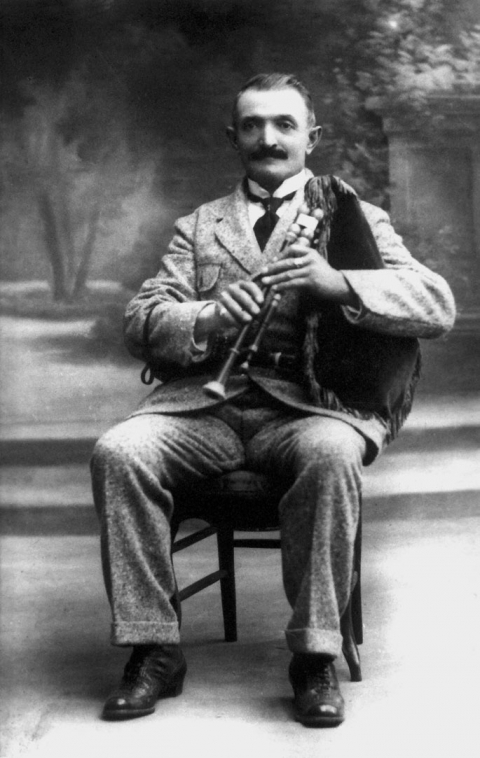
Antoine Bouscatel

Antoine ("Bousca") Bouscatel (or Antonin; born 9 March 1867, Cantal, France; died 1945) was a French cabrette bagpipe player, well-known at the turn of the 20th century in Paris.

"The hailed king of the bag pipes was Antoine "Bousca" Bouscatel. Born in 1867 in the Cantal region of the French Auvergne, he received his first pipes when he was eight years old. Bouscatel spend his days alone in the Auvergnat alps tending his family's cows and goats and teaching himself to play. It was his music of a goatherd that Bouscatel brought to Paris.

He arrived in the capital (Paris) in 1890 when he was 23. Like many Auvergnat farmhands, he came to Paris seeking a better life, part of a wave of immigration from the Auvergne. Bouscatel settled in what were then the fringes of the city in la Roquette, the Faubourg Saint-Antoine near where the old Bastille once stood, far from the grand boulevards and Opera. The neighborhood was known in Auvergnat argot as la Bastoche, and it became a veritable village of the Auvergne transplanted into the heart of Paris."

'Musicians like Bouscatel were often hired to play with friends and private family affairs on Sundays for, "a small taste of the dew of paradise in the limbo of the big city.".'

"Bouscatel worked during the day as a boilermaker and coppersmith, common work among Auvergnats. But when night descended, he packed up his musette and set out to play. He honed his crude country style and no longer sounded like a goatherd: Recordings of Bouscatel display a musician able to coax enchanting sounds from his crude instrument and play rousing bourrees that kept the good times alive."

By 1903, Bouscatel was the star of a small bistro named Au Chalet, crowded in between scrap-metal dealers' shops and groceries on the street known to all as the Auvergnat heaven on Earth, rue de Lappe. It was on rue de Lappe that Bouscatel was crowned the king of the musette. He gave up his day job to perform through the nights, and by 1910, Au Chalet was in Bouscatel's hands and renamed Chez Bouscatel. Over the years, Bouscael expanded his bal into a grand dance hall. He appeared each evening still wearing his biaude blouse, felt hat, and red scarf, symbols of Auvergnat tradition applauded by his crowds, even though they had traded their old farm wear for work clothes suited to the factories. Bouscatel also still cultivated a ground moustache in the best Auvergnat style. Like many pipers, he wore on his ankles bracelets of bells with which he kept time and provided his own simple accompaniment. Often, he played solo. Other times, he led a trio of a violin and hurdy-gurdy. With a shout of "He les enfants!" Bouscatel pumped up the red-velvet-covered airbag with his right arm, blew into the mouthpiece, and the night began."

== Sources ==
- Ursula Hemetek. Manifold identities: studies on music and minorities. Cambridge Scholars Press, 2004. ISBN 1-904303-37-4, ISBN 978-1-904303-37-4
- Michael Dregni's book, "Django, The Life and Music of a Gypsy Legend". Copyright 2004.
