= The Infinite (album) =

Studio album by Dave Douglas
- Released: 2002
- Recorded: December 16–18, 2001
- Studio: Avatar, New York City
- Genre: Jazz
- Label: RCA
- Producer: Dave Douglas

Dave Douglas chronology
Witness (2001)	The Infinite (2002)	Freak In (2003)

The Infinite is the 19th album by American jazz trumpeter Dave Douglas. It was released on the RCA label in 2002 and has performances by Douglas, Chris Potter, Uri Caine, James Genus and Clarence Penn.

== Reception ==
Professional ratings
Review scores
Source	Rating
Allmusic	3/5 stars

The Allmusic review by Dave Lynch awarded the album 3 stars stating, "The Infinite is a strong debut release from Douglas' New Quintet. Those with tastes tending toward post-bop and pre-fusion jazz should find much to like here, with the album perhaps serving as an entry point to the trumpeter's more chance-taking endeavors". On All About Jazz, C. Andrew Hovan wrote, "The Infinite is the record I've been waiting for Dave to make for some time now. It's not too left of center, has a drummer on board, and allows Douglas' own eclectic sense of musical adventure to run wild."

== Track listing ==
All compositions by Dave Douglas except as indicated

1. "Poses" (Rufus Wainwright) - 5:38
2. "The Infinite" - 6:34
3. "Penelope" - 9:15
4. "Crazy Games" (Mary J. Blige, Kenneth Dickerson) - 4:38
5. "Waverly" - 7:23
6. "Yorke" - 6:18
7. "Unison" (Björk) - 5:01
8. "Deluge" - 5:43
9. "Argo" - 3:35

== Personnel ==
- Dave Douglas – trumpet
- Chris Potter – tenor saxophone, bass clarinet
- Uri Caine – Fender Rhodes
- James Genus – bass
- Clarence Penn – drums
