= Helter Shelter =

Helter Shelter may refer to:

- Helter Shelter (cartoon), a 1955 Woody Woodpecker cartoon
- "Helter Shelter" (The Simpsons), a 2002 episode of the animated television series The Simpsons
- "Helter Shelter" (The Powerpuff Girls) a 2001 episode of the animated television series The Powerpuff Girls
