= Dans la Nuit (album) =

Dans la nuit

Soundtrack album by Louis Sclavis
- Released: 2002
- Recorded: October 2000
- Studio: Studios la Buissonne; Pernes-les-Fontaines
- Genre: Jazz
- Length: 54:52
- Label: ECM; ECM 1805
- Producer: Manfred Eicher

Louis Sclavis chronology
L'Affrontement des Prétendants (1999)	Dans la nuit (2002)	Napoli's Walls (2002)

Dans la nuit is a soundtrack by French clarinetist Louis Sclavis recorded in October 2000 and released on ECM in 2002. The album was initialized through an invitation of French director Bertrand Tavernier to Sclavis, he agreed and wrote this music to Charles Vanel's 1929 film Dans la nuit.

== Reception ==
The AllMusic review by Glenn Astarita awarded the album 4½ stars stating "Sclavis' multi-hued and altogether vividly constructed arrangements hit the mark in a noticeably huge way."

Professional ratings
Review scores
Source	Rating
Allmusic	4.5/5 stars
The Penguin Guide to Jazz Recordings	3/4 stars

== Track listing ==
All compositions by Louis Sclavis except as indicated

1. "Dia dia" - 1:15
2. "Le travail" - 6:00
3. "Dans la nuit" - 3:39
4. "Fête foraine" - 4:57
5. "Retour de noce" - 2:17
6. "Mauvais rêve" - 1:41
7. "Amour et beauté" - 2:49
8. "L'Accident Part 1" - 3:35
9. "L'Accident Part 2" - 3:17
10. "Le miroir" (Vincent Courtois, Jean-Louis Matinier, François Merville, Louis Sclavis) - 4:43
11. "Dans la nuit" - 1:11
12. "La fuite" (Courtois, Matinier, Merville, Sclavis) - 5:14
13. "La peur du noir" (Matinier) - 1:27
14. "Les 2 visages" - 6:19
15. "Dia dia" - 5:00
16. "Dans la nuit" - 1:29

== Personnel ==
- Louis Sclavis – clarinet, bass clarinet
- Jean-Louis Matinier – accordion
- Dominique Pifarély – violin
- Vincent Courtois – cello
- François Merville – percussion, marimba
