= Strangers in the Night (disambiguation) =

"Strangers in the Night" is a song.

Strangers in the Night may also refer to:

- Strangers in the Night (Frank Sinatra album)
- Strangers in the Night (UFO album)
- "Strangers in the Night", a song by Interpol re-titled as "C'mere"
- "747 (Strangers in the Night)" a song by British heavy metal band Saxon
- Strangers in the Night (film), a 1944 film directed by Anthony Mann
- "Strangers in the Night" (ALF), a 1986 television episode
- "Strangers in the Night" (Modern Family), a 2014 television episode
