= Michel Godard =

Michel Godard may refer to:

- Michel Godard (musician)
- Michel Godard (politician)

== See also ==
- Michael Godard, artist
- Michael Goddard, animal geneticist
