= GRIM =

GRIM (Groupe de recherche et d'improvisation musicales, roughly translated Group of Research and Musical Innovation; Occitan: Grop de Recerca e d'Innovacion Musicale), was a non-profit organization for improvised and experimental music. The GRIM was based at the Montévidéo, a cultural centre in Marseille, France. A voluntary association, it was co-founded in 1978 by guitarist-composer Jean-Marc Montera; saxophonists André Jaume, David Rueff, and Lionel Dublanchet; and percussionist Gerard Siracusa. Its stated goal was to further the development of musique vivante, a term coined by the group which referred to a type of music free from categorization which blended jazz, contemporary art music, improvised music, and other musical source materials.

Grim was funded by the city of Marseille with a focus on organizing musical events. The organisation hosted concerts, workshops, lectures, artist in residence projects and studio recording sessions, in addition to having a multimedia public library with books and music relating to avant garde music, experimental music, improvised music, sound art and contemporary music. It previously helped organise the festivals Nuit d'Hiver and Sonic Protest. Jaume left GRIM in 1984, and Siracusa departed in 1885. Prominent members of the organization included jazz trumpeter Guy Longnon, double bass player Bruno Chevillon, and trombonist Yves Robert.

As of March 2017, the GRIM has been absorbed into the gmem CNCM, another creative institute also located in Marseille.

== Educational activities ==
Members of the public (children, professionals, music-lovers, etc.) could access classes in which they were taught by music professionals over a fixed period. Regular workshops with founder Jean-Marc Montera (Department of Musicology of the University of Provence) were also available.

== See also ==
- IRCAM
