= Rémy Couvez =

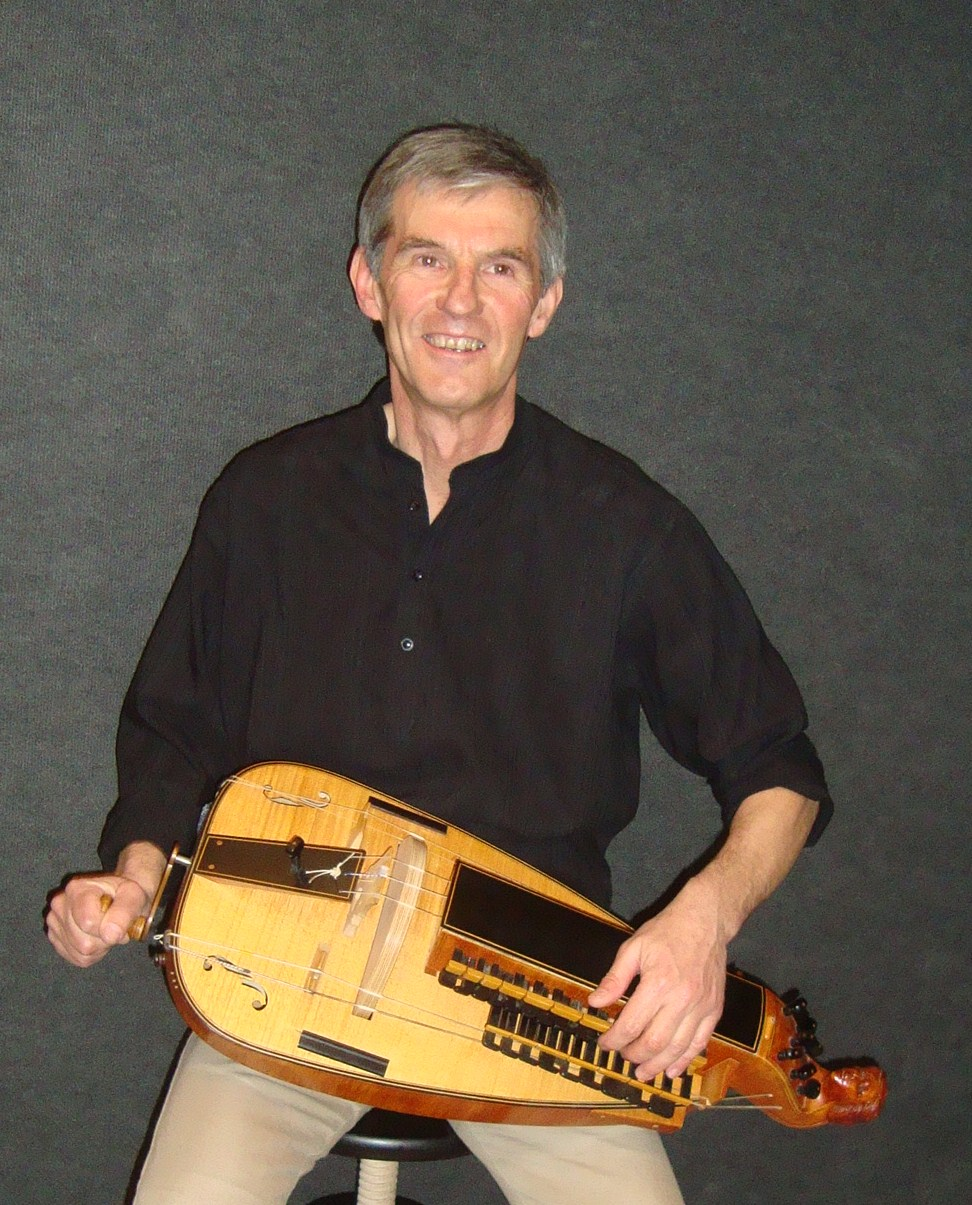
- Rémy Couvez

Background information
- Occupation(s): Musician, composer
- Instrument: Hurdy-gurdy
- Years active: 1982–present
- Website: www.remycouvez.com

Rémy Couvez is a French composer and viellist, a musician who plays the hurdy-gurdy.

== Biography ==
He was introduced to the hurdy-gurdy in 1978, and he started playing the instrument in 1981. Until 2000, he created music combining the hurdy-gurdy with electric instruments. Since then, he's come back to acoustic music.

== Concerts ==
In 1982, he performed his first concert solo.

He's currently doing concerts with:

- Quintet: hurdy gurdy, baroque oboe, harpsichord, sackbut and cello ;
- Duet: hurdy gurdy and pipe organ.

== Discography ==
Sources:

- 1986: Paysages Intérieurs, self-published
- 1993: Propos Insolites, Buda Musique editions
- 1997: Itinérances, Buda Musique editions
- 2000: Wheeling Dance, Buda Musique editions
- 2008: Confluence, Buda Musique editions
- 2012: Wood Song, Buda Musique editions
- 2014: Vielle et Orgue, Buda Musique editions
- 2018: Quintus Novum, Buda Musique editions
