= In the Night Tour =

2011 concert tour by Kelly Key

- Tour by Kelly Key
- Associated album: Studio K
- Start date: April 16, 2011

Kelly Key concert chronology
- Holiday Tour (2010); In the Night Tour (2011)

In the Night Tour was the seventh concert tour by Brazilian pop recording artist Kelly Key to promote concerts only in LGBT nightclubs.

== Development ==
The tour (without an album basis) brought the singer's biggest hits in remixed versions by DJ especially for the gay community, as well as covers and new songs added during the tour. The shows promoted by Kelly Key performed only indoors as nightclubs as discos and nightclubs as a way to fit the work done by singers like Wanessa and Lorena Simpson. The tour has gogoboys and special effects on stage and screen.

== Set List ==
Act 1: Welcome to... In The Night Tour

- 01. "K Diferente"
- 02. "Só Quero Ficar"
- 03. "Anjo"
- 04. "O Amor e o Poder"
- 05. "Adoleta" (remix)
- 06. "Pegue e Puxe" (remix)
- 07. "I Deserve It"
- 08. "Poker Face" (Lady Gaga cover)

Act 2: Só Para Maiores (en: Only for people over age)

- 09. "Barbie Girl" (remix)
- 10. "Baba" (remix)
- 11. "Escondido"
  - Intro: "Summer Lie" (Eliza G song)
- 12. "Shake Boom"
- 13. "O Problema é Meu"
- 14. "Cachorrinho" (remix)
- 15. "Pegue e Puxe"
- 16. "4 Minutes" (Madonna cover)

=== Additional songs ===
- "Chic, Chic" (performer only in Brasília)

== Opening acts ==
- DJ Hellen Chic (Brasília)

== Dates ==
| Date | City | Country | Venue |
|---|---|---|---|
South America
| April 16, 2011 | Brasília | Brazil | Blue Space |
| April 17, 2011 | Santo Antônio de Jesus | Brazil | Feira de Eventos do Recôncavo |
| April 23, 2011 | Rio de Janeiro | Brazil | Le Boy |
| May 7, 2011 | Santos | Brazil | Capital Disco / Liquid Love |
| May 14, 2011 | São José do Rio Preto | Brazil | Mixed Club |
