= Dans la nuit (film) =

1929 film

In the Night
- French: Dans la nuit
- Directed by: Charles Vanel
- Written by: Charles Vanel
- Starring: Charles Vanel; Sandra Milovanoff
- Release date: 1930
- Running time: 75 minutes
- Country: France
- Language: Silent

Dans la nuit (English: In the Night) is a 1929 French silent film by Charles Vanel. The film is a macabre drama about a disfigured worker who wears a mask to hide his face from his unfaithful wife. The producers imposed a happy ending on the film. Louis Sclavis recorded a jazz soundtrack album Dans la nuit for ECM in 2002.

== Plot ==
In a small mining town, a couple gets married, attending a celebration in town before returning home for the night. Months later, the husband is injured because of an explosion at the pit where he works. He survives but is left with disfiguring scars on his face, which he covers with a mask.

The wife falls for another man, and the two form a plan to run away together. At the last minute, the husband comes home to find them together, ready to leave. The two men get into a fight, each wearing a mask, and the husband is overpowered. They dump the body into a pool of water in the mine. The following morning, the wife begs to leave town, only to find that her husband had attacked her affair partner and taken his place before they hid the body. She awakens in bed to see her unscarred husband and realizes that the whole story had been a terrible nightmare.
