= Valentin Clastrier =

French musician (born 1947)

French musician Valentin Clastrier (born 1947) is a French musician who specializes in contemporary music for the hurdy-gurdy; before Clastrier, the instrument was used primarily in the performance of European Medieval and folk musics.

He began his career as a guitarist, and was introduced to the hurdy-gurdy in 1970. His instrument has 27 strings rather than the conventional six. Since 2006 Clastrier works together with Wolfgang Weichselbaumer on a new prototype.

Clastrier's compositions for the instrument (in both acoustic and electroacoustic versions) have been recorded, in collaboration with other creative European musicians (including tubist and serpent player Michel Godard, accordionist Jean-Louis Matinier, saxophonist/clarinetists Michaël Riessler and Louis Sclavis, and percussionists Gérard Siracusa and Carlo Rizzo).

== See also ==
- Dominique Regef

http://www.valentinclastrier.com/
