= Lê Quan Ninh =

French percussionist (born 1961)

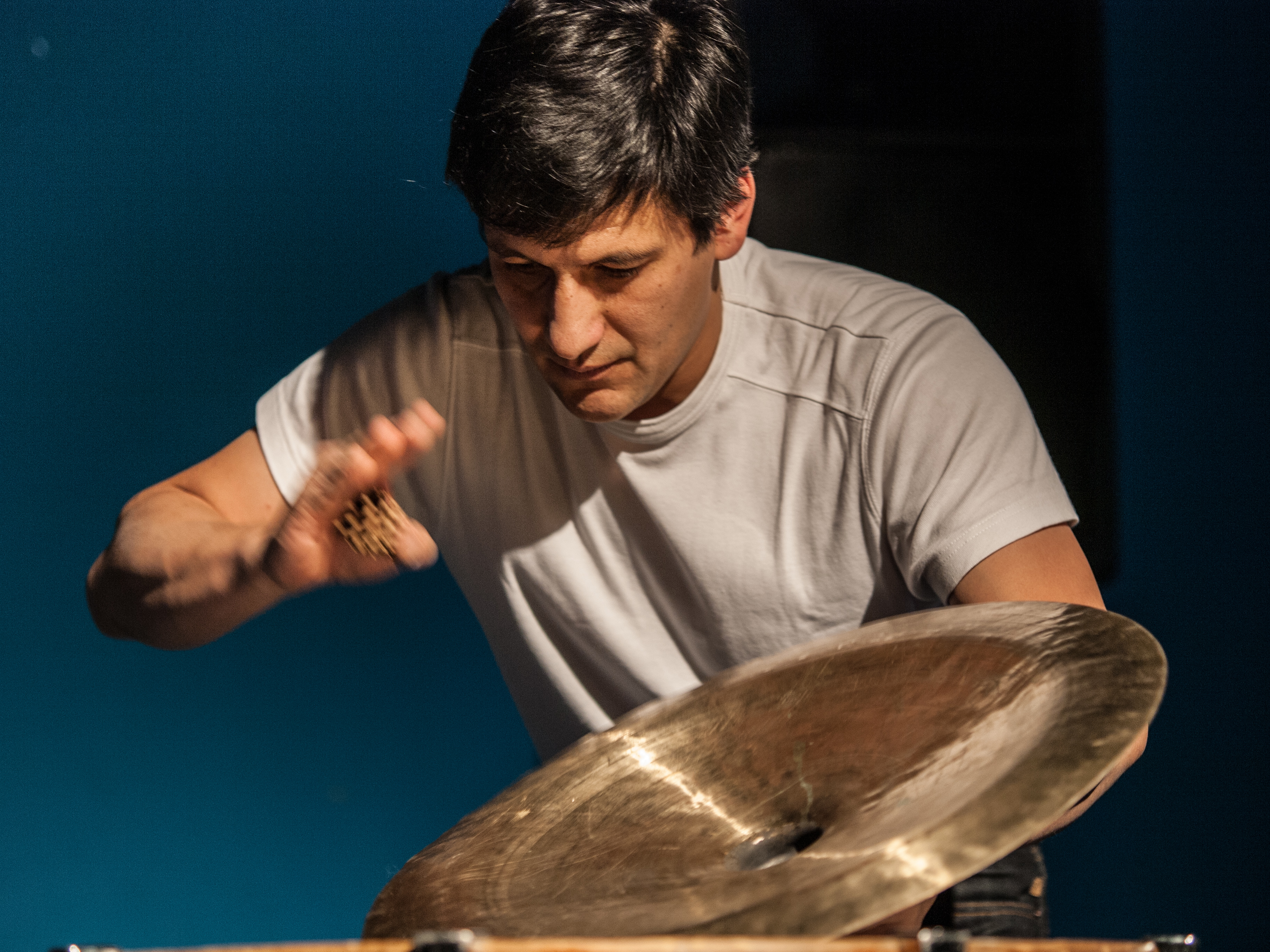

Lê Quan Ninh (born Paris, 1961) is a French percussionist active in contemporary music and free improvisation.

He began studying piano at the age of 7, but turned towards percussion as a teenager. When he was 16, he entered the National Conservatory in Versailles. During this time he discovered free jazz. After graduating, he taught percussion for 3 years at a conservatory in Bondy, France while performing with contemporary music, dance, and theater groups often using self-taught techniques and found objects in his improvisation.

In the 1980s Ninh collaborated with Daunik Lazro, Michel Doneda, Serge Pey, Peter Kowald, Butch Morris, and Nicolas Peskine's Compagnie du Hasard.

In 1992 Ninh founded the Association La Flibuste which organized and presented improvisational artistic events across genres. He was a member of the multi-media percussion ensemble Quatuor Helios and, along with cellist Martine Altenburger, a founder of the ensemble]h[iatus.

== Selected works ==
- Ustensiles
- Le Ventre Négatif
