= Louis Sclavis =

French jazz musician

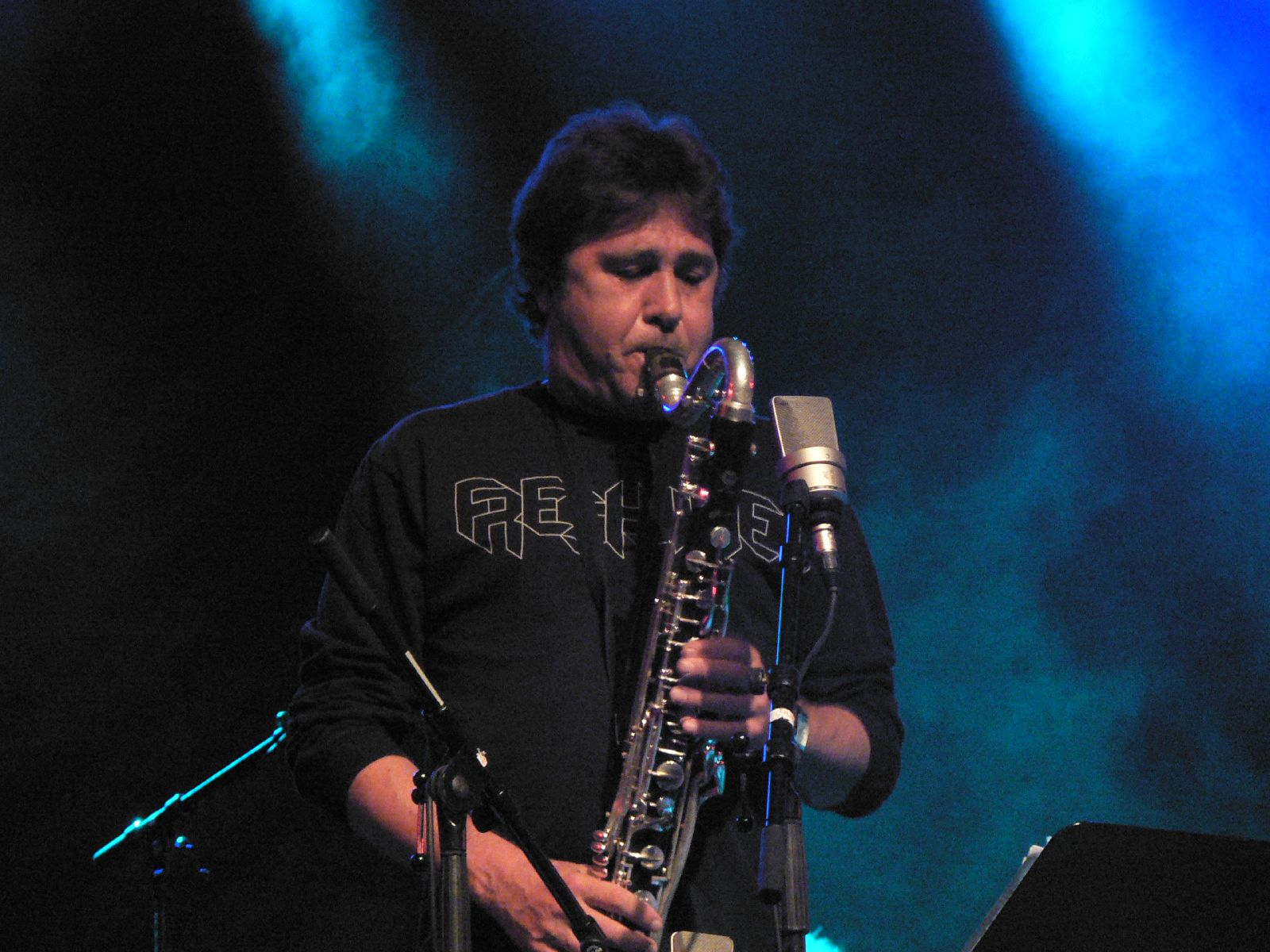
- Louis Sclavis in 2007

Background information
- Born: 2 February 1953 (age 73); Lyon, France
- Genres: Jazz, Avant-garde jazz, free jazz, free improvisation, contemporary classical
- Occupations: Musician, songwriter, record producer
- Instruments: Clarinet, bass clarinet, soprano saxophone
- Years active: 1975–present
- Labels: ECM, Label Bleu, Clean Feed, FMP, Yolk Records

Louis Sclavis (born 2 February 1953) is a French jazz musician. He performs on clarinet, bass clarinet, and soprano saxophone in a variety of contexts, including avant-garde jazz, free jazz, free improvisation and contemporary classical.

== Life and career ==
He was born in Lyon, France. Sclavis played with the Henri Texier Quartet.

He has won numerous awards, including: the PRIX DJANGO REINHARDT “best French jazz musician” (1988); First Prize in the Barcelona Biennale (1989); the British Jazz award at the Midem for “Best Foreign Artist” (1990/91); the DJANGO D’OR “Best French jazz record of the year” (1993); and the GRAND PRIX SACEM 2009.

He was one of the first to combine jazz with French folk music, working most prominently with the hurdy-gurdy player Valentin Clastrier.

His latest album India (Yolk Records, 2025) is a direct reference to the title of his 1987 album Chine. The nine compositions of him have been recorded in Novembre 2024 by the new Louis Sclavis Quintet: Sarah Murcia on double bass, Benjamin Moussay on piano, Olivier Laisney on trumpet and Christophe Lavergne on drums.

== Discography ==
- Ad Augusta Per Argustia (Nato, 1981)
- Clarinettes (Label Bleu, 1985)
- Chine (Ida, 1987)
- Chamber Music (Ida, 1989)
- Ellington on the Air (Ida, 1991)
- Rouge (ECM, 1991)
- Trio de Clarinettes: Live (FMP, 1991)
- Acoustic Quartet (ECM, 1994)
- Carnet de Routes (Label Bleu, 1995)
- Ceux qui veillent la nuit (JMS, 1996)
- Danses et Autres Scenes (JMS, 1998)
- Les Violences de Rameau (ECM, 1996)
- Suite Africaine (Label Bleu, 1999)
- L'Affrontement des Prétendants (ECM, 1999)
- Dans la Nuit (ECM, 2000)
- Napoli's Walls (ECM, 2002)
- Bow River Falls (Koch, 2004)
- Roman, (2004);
- African Flashback (Label Bleu, 2005)
- L'Imparfait des Langues (ECM, 2007)
- Lost on the Way (ECM, 2009)
- Eldorado Trio (Clean Feed, 2010)
- Sources (ECM, 2012)
- Silk and Salt Melodies (ECM, 2014)
- Characters On A Wall (ECM, 2019)
- Les Cadances Du Monde (JMS-Cream, 2022)
- Langues Et Lueurs (Yolk Records, 2023) avec Jean-Paul Delore & Sebastien Boisseau
- Unfolding (ECM Records, 2023) Duo avec Benjamin Moussay
- India (Yolk Records, 2025) avec Sarah Murcia, Benjamin Moussay, Olivier Laisney, Christophe Lavergne

== Filmography ==
- 1999: It All Starts Today (Ça commence aujourd'hui) by Bertrand Tavernier (Sony Music France)
- 2002: A Moment of Happiness by Antoine Santana
- 2002: Dans la nuit by Charles Vanel (ECM)
- 2002: Vivre me tue by Jean-Pierre Sinapi
- 2007: After Him (Après lui) by Gaël Morel
- 2009: Plus tard tu comprendras by Amos Gitaï
- 2009: Portraits-autoportraits by Gilles Porte
- 2011: Roses à crédit by Amos Gitaï
- 2015: La porte d'Anna by Patrick Dumont & François Hébrard
- 2017: La consolation by Magaly Richard-Serrano
- 2019: Nicolas Philibert, hasard et nécessité by Jean-Louis Comolli
- 2022: The Sixth Child by Léopold Legrand
- 2024: Shikun by Amos Gitaï
