= Bruno Chevillon =

French jazz double bassist

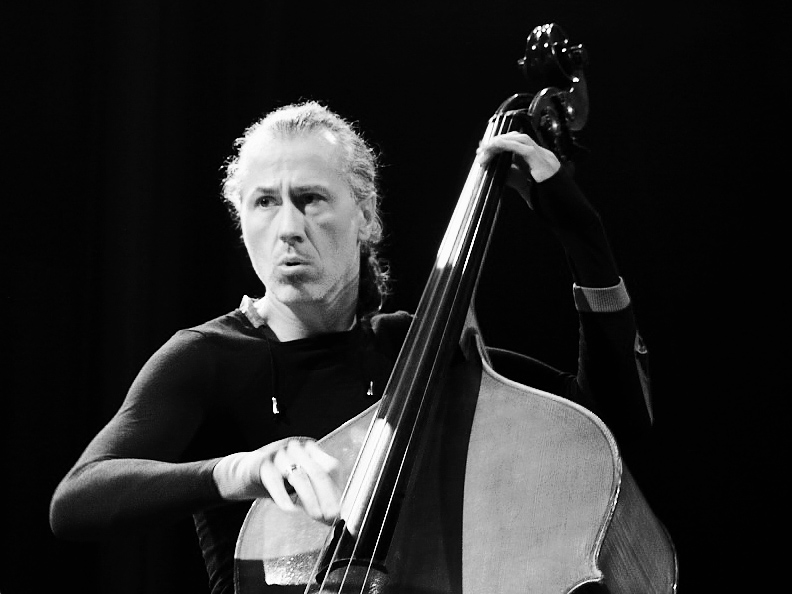
Bruno Chevillon

Bruno Chevillon (born 23 August 1959) is a French jazz double bassist who is well known in avant-garde jazz as well as in new improvised music.

== Life ==
Born in Valréas Vaucluse, Chevillon followed a double training since he graduated from the Beaux Arts in 1983, where he studied photography, and at the same time followed Joseph Fabre's classical double bass teaching at the Conservatoire à rayonnement régional d'Avignon. He made his debut in jazz by following the class of André Jaume, is a member of the Groupe de recherche et d'improvisation musicales (GRIM), and then joined the Lyon collective Association à la Recherche d'un Folklore Imaginaire where he made a decisive encounter: that of Louis Sclavis. Chevillon was then associated with a large part of the clarinettist's projects.

In addition to his long collaboration with Sclavis, the double bassist plays with the main actors of avant-garde jazz and Free improvisation : Marc Ducret, Claude Barthélemy, Stéphan Oliva, François Corneloup, François Raulin, Joey Baron, Elliott Sharp, Franck Vigroux, Benjamin de la Fuente, Samuel Sighicelli, Laurent Dehors, Gerome Nox etc.

Essentially a sideman, Chevillon also flourishes as a soloist, however, notably in his performance on Pier Paolo Pasolini. Contemporary classical music is also part of his work.

In 2007, he recorded his only solo album Hors-Champ published on the label d'Autres Cordes, which mixes double bass and electronics. In 2014, he joined the [National Jazz Orchestra] as artistic advisor, alongside Olivier Benoit.

== Recordings ==
- 1994: Acoustic Quartet, with Louis Sclavis, Dominique Pifarély, Marc Ducret - ECM
- 1999: L'Ombra Di Verdi within the Marc Ducret Trio - Screwgun Records
- 2007: Hors-Champ - d'Autres Cordes
- 2011: Old And Unwise, with Tim Berne - Clean Feed
- 2012: Caravaggio #2 within the group Caravaggio (Benjamin de la Fuente, Éric Échampard and Samuel Sighicelli) - La Buissonne
- 2013: Stretching Out with Samo Salamon, Dominique Pifarely and Roberto Dani - Samo Records
