= Bedrock 3 =

Studio album by Uri Caine
- Released: 2001
- Recorded: March 8, 2001
- Genre: Jazz
- Length: 60:18
- Label: Winter & Winter 910 068
- Producer: Stefan Winter

Uri Caine chronology
The Goldberg Variations (2000)	Bedrock 3 (2001)	Solitaire (2001)

Bedrock 3 is an album by Uri Caine with Tim Lefebvre and Zach Danziger which was released on the Winter & Winter label in 2001.

== Reception ==
Professional ratings
Review scores
Source	Rating
Allmusic	3.5/5 stars
Tom Hull	A−
The Penguin Guide to Jazz Recordings	3/4 stars

In his review for Allmusic, David R. Adler notes that "a jazz/hip-hop hybrid with a personal and accessible avant-garde thrust. Hip, spacy, and sometimes dark, the music also has its tongue-in-cheek aspects". On All About Jazz Phil DiPietro said "Frankly, outside of Herbie's recorded output, I can't come up with a recording of electric piano, bass and drums that so thoroughly throws down in so complex, yet so tight, yet so accessible fashion as this one".

== Track listing ==
All compositions by Uri Caine, Tim Lefebvre & Zach Danziger

1. "Our Hour" – 8:52
2. "Nymphomania" – 6:35
3. "Fang" – 5:54
4. "Skins" – 2:22
5. "Humphrey Pass My Way" – 6:28
6. "Flagrant Fragrant" – 5:06
7. "Toe Jam" – 3:52
8. "Red Eye" – 2:42
9. "Lobby Daze" – 7:36
10. "J. Edgar Hoover in a Dress" – 4:37
11. "Root Canal" – 6:08

== Personnel ==
- Uri Caine – Fender Rhodes piano
- Tim Lefebvre – bass
- Zach Danziger – drums
- DJ Logic – turntables (tracks 8 & 11)
- Jessie System (track 9), Pete Davenport (track 11) – vocals
