= James Genus =

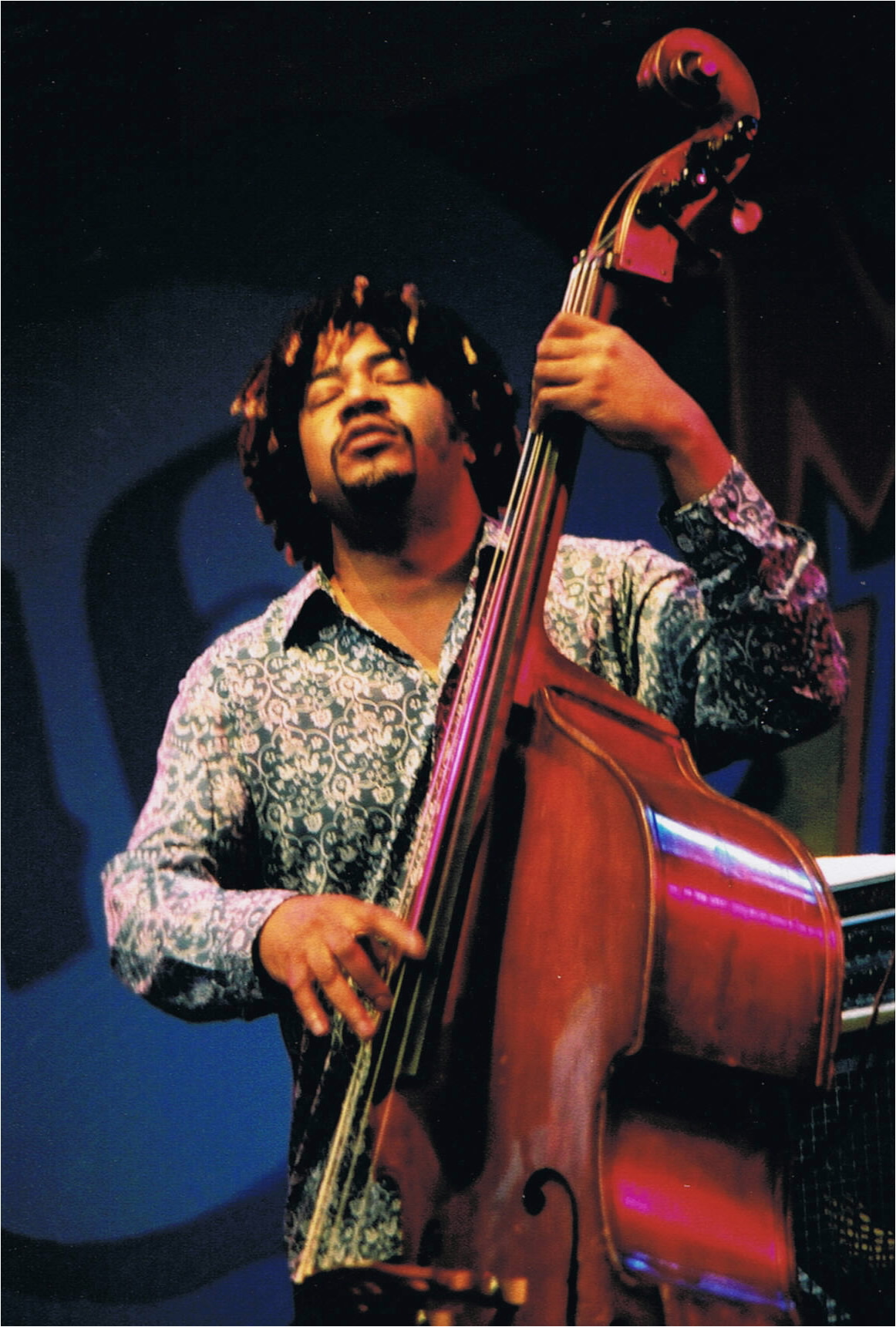
- Genus performing at the 51st Monterey Jazz Festival 19 September 2008

Background information
- Born: 20 January 1966 (age 60); Hampton, Virginia, U.S.
- Genre: Jazz
- Occupation: Musician
- Instruments: Guitar, Bass guitar, upright bass
- Years active: 1987–present
- Member of: Saturday Night Live Band

James Genus (born January 20, 1966) is an American jazz bassist. He plays both electric bass guitar and upright bass and currently plays in the Saturday Night Live Band. He also occasionally fills in for Mark Kelley of the hip hop band The Roots. Genus has performed as a session musician and sideman throughout his career, having worked with an extensive list of artists.

== Biography ==
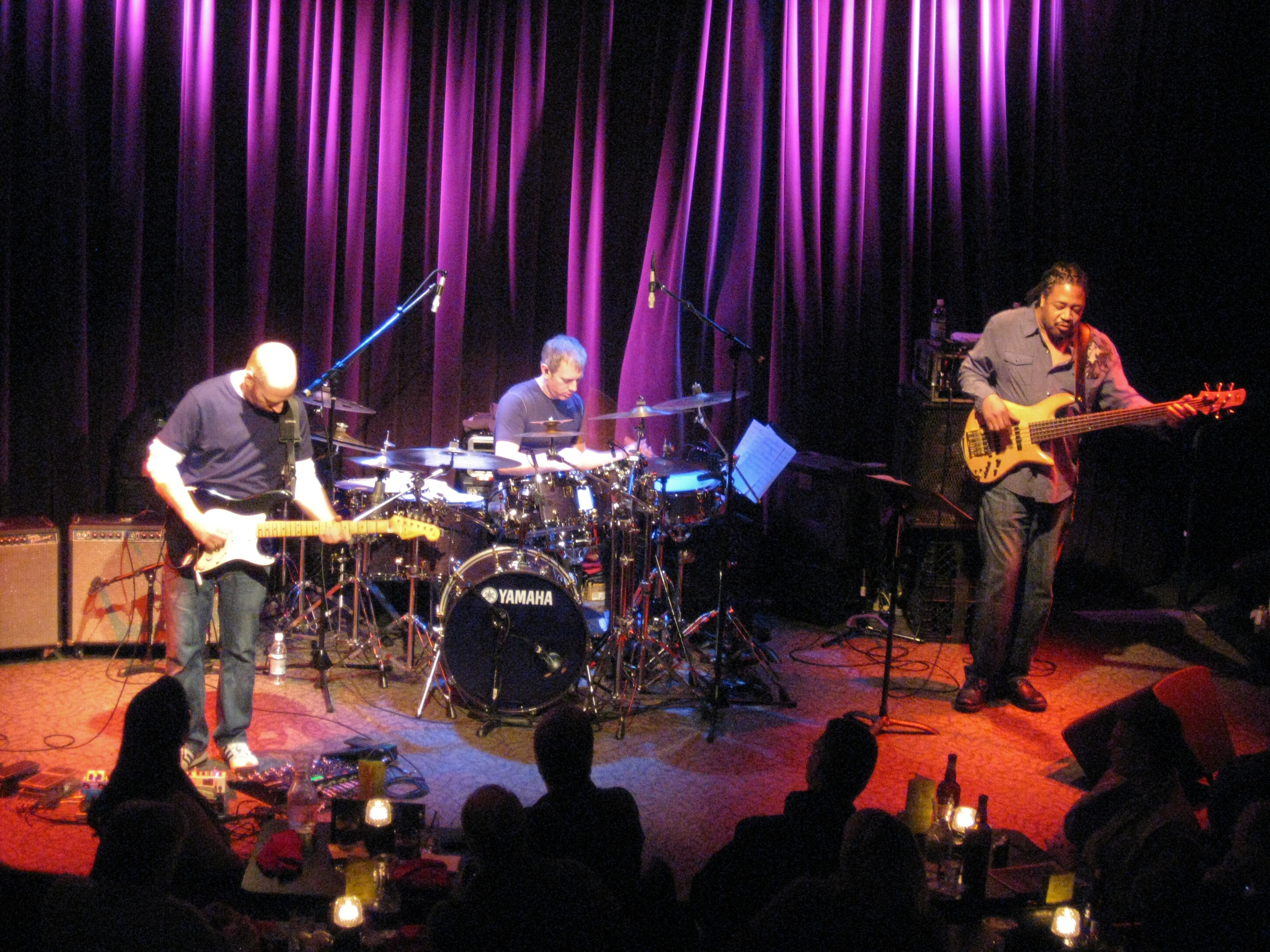
Genus with Oz Noy on guitar and Dave Weckl on drums.

Genus was born in Hampton, Virginia. He began on guitar at age six and switched to bass at 13. He studied at Virginia Commonwealth University from 1983 to 1987 and played for a summer at Busch Gardens Williamsburg. Then he moved to New York City, where he quickly began working with many noted players on the city's jazz scene. He has played with Out of the Blue (1988–89), Horace Silver (1989), Roy Haynes and Don Pullen (1989–91), Nat Adderley (1990), Greg Osby and New York Voices (1990–91), Jon Faddis (1991), T.S. Monk (1991), Benny Golson (1991), Dave Kikoski (1991), Bob Berg (1991–96), Geoffrey Keezer (1992), Lee Konitz (1992), Michael Brecker (1992–96), Bob James (since 1994), Michel Camilo (since 1995), Elysian Fields (since 1995), Branford Marsalis (1996), Chick Corea (1996), Didier Lockwood (1996), Dave Douglas (1996), Uri Caine (1997), Global Theory (1997), Ravi Coltrane (2000), Bill Evans (2005), Herbie Hancock (2008), and Daft Punk (2013).

== Discography ==
=== As sideman ===
With Nat Adderley

- The Old Country (Alfa, 1990)

With Greg Osby

- Man-Talk for Moderns, Vol. X (Blue Note, 1990)

With The Brecker Brothers

- Return of the Brecker Brothers (GRP, 1992)
- Out of the Loop (Brecker Brothers album) (GRP, 1994) - 37th Annual Grammy Awards Best Contemporary Jazz Performance

With Gary Burton

- Generations (Concord, 2004)

With Uri Caine

- Blue Wail (Winter & Winter, 1999)
- The Sidewalks of New York: Tin Pan Alley (Winter & Winter, 1999)
- The Goldberg Variations (Winter & Winter, 2000)

With James Carter

- Present Tense (EmArcy, 2008)

With Dave Douglas

- In Our Lifetime (New World, 1995)
- Stargazer (Arabesque, 1997)
- Moving Portrait (DIW, 1998)
- Magic Triangle (Arabesque, 1998)
- Soul on Soul (RCA, 2000)
- Leap of Faith (Arabesque, 2000)
- The Infinite (RCA, 2002)
- Strange Liberation (Bluebird, 2003)
- Meaning and Mystery (Greenleaf, 2006)
- Live at the Jazz Standard (Greenleaf, 2007)

With Benny Golson

- Domingo (Dreyfus, 1992)

With Alex Han

- Spirit (3 Deuces, 2017)

With Lee Konitz

- Jazz Nocturne (Venus/Evidence, 1992 [1994])

With Geoff Keezer

- World Music (DIW, 1992)

With Pat Martino

- Stone Blue (Blue Note, 1998)

With Steve Masakowski

- What It Was (Blue Note, 1993)

With T. S. Monk

- Take One (Blue Note, 1992)

With Don Pullen

- Random Thoughts (Blue Note, 1990)

With John Beasley

- Positootly! (Resonance, 2009)

With Daft Punk

- Random Access Memories (Columbia, 2013)

With James Williams

- Up to The Minute Blues (DIW, 1994)
