= Vittorio Ghielmi =

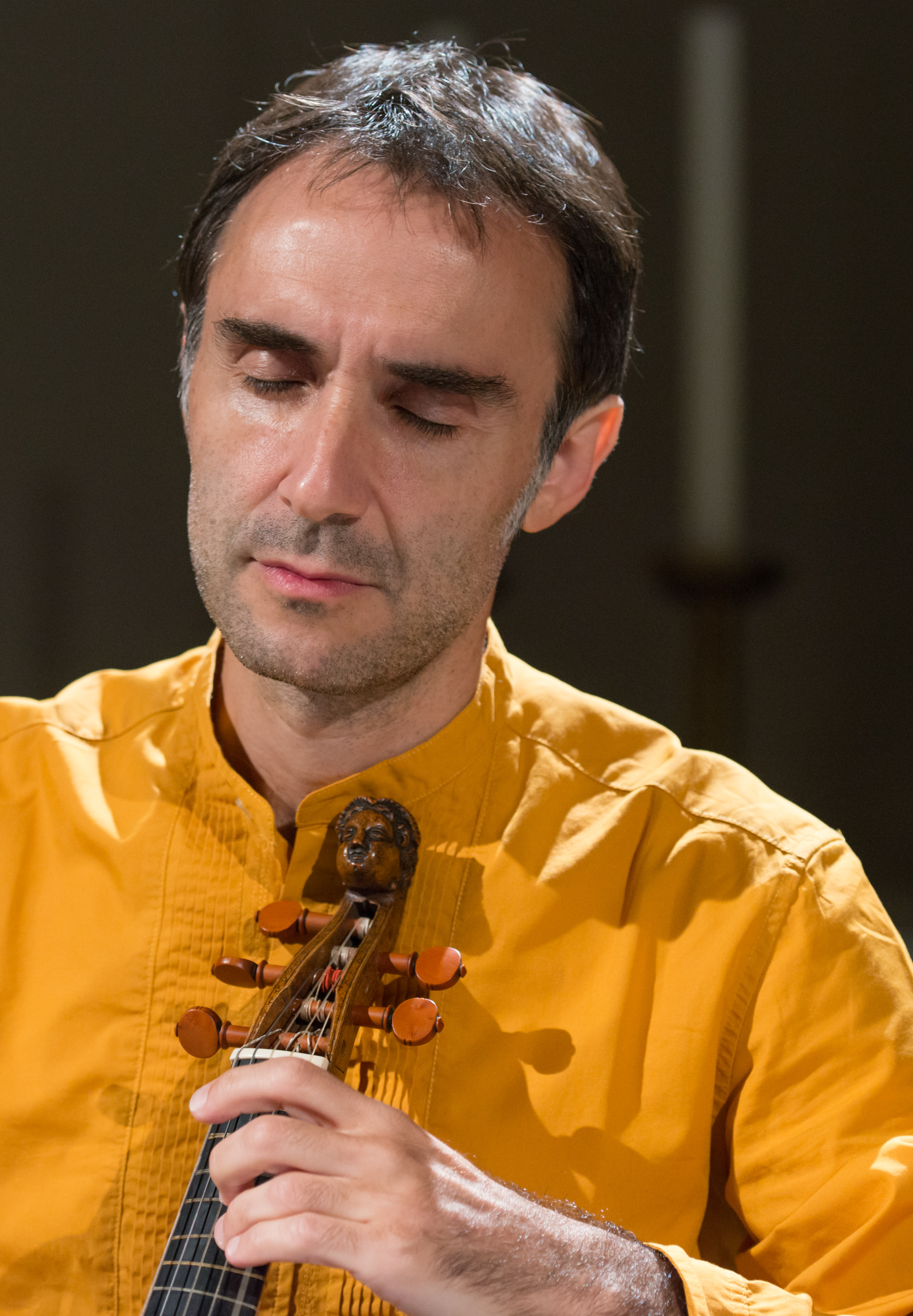
Vittorio Ghielmi (foto Holger Schneider)

Vittorio Ghielmi is a Milanese soloist (viola da gamba), conductor, composer. He has been compared by critics to Jasha Heifetz ("Diapason") for his virtuosity, and described as "An Alchemist of sound" ("Diario de Sevilla"), "A shaman of the viol" ("La Repubblica") or "Ein Teufelgambist" (“Mittelbayerische Zeitung”) for the intensity and versatility of his musical interpretations.

- Le violiste au coup d’archet le plus libre et le plus enlevé de la planète. (Radio France "France Musique").

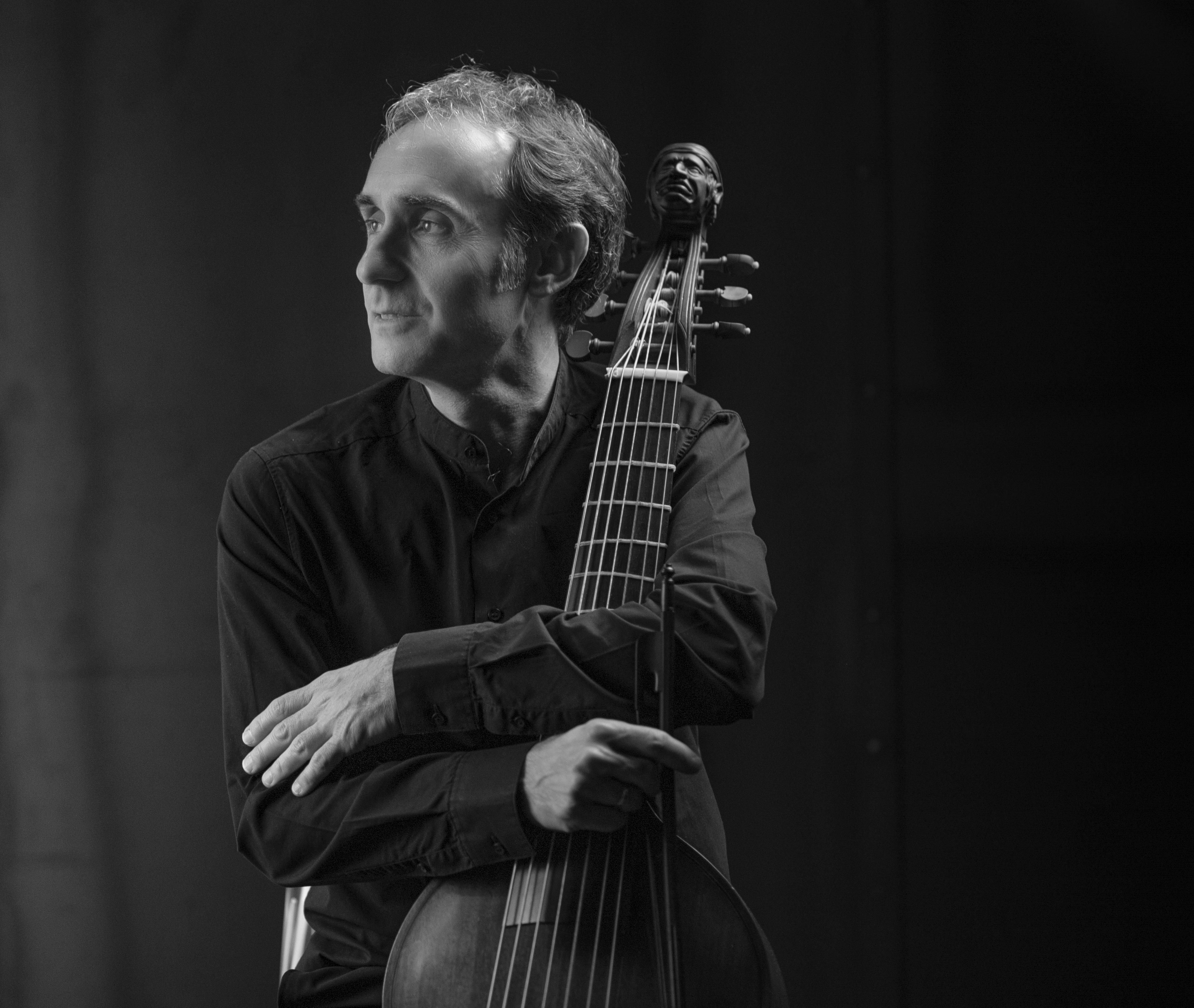
Vittorio Ghielmi (foto Orlando Bonaldo)

As viola da gamba soloist or conductor, he appears regularly with famous orchestras in the fields of both classical, modern and early music (Los Angeles Philharmonic Orchestra – with J.G.Graun's Concerto in the Hollywood Bowl; the London Philharmonia, Staatskapelle Berlin, The Wiener Philharmoniker, the Wiener-Symphoniker, Il Giardino Armonico, the Freiburg Baroque Orchestra, Akamus etc.). He is one of the few viola da gamba players regularly invited to appear as a soloist-conductor with orchestras and he has been invited as soloist for the world première of many new compositions, often dedicated to him (Kevin Volans, White man's sleep, Teatro Regio di Torino; Nadir Vassena, Bagatelle trascendentali for viola da gamba, lute and orchestra, Berliner Philharmoniker Hall, 2006; Uri Caine Concerto for viola da gamba and orchestra, Amsterdam Concertgebouw and Bozar Bruxelles 2008; Caine Concerto per viola da gamba, basset-horn and Orchestra, Passau 2012 etc.). He has been assistant to Riccardo Muti at the Salzburg Festspiele.

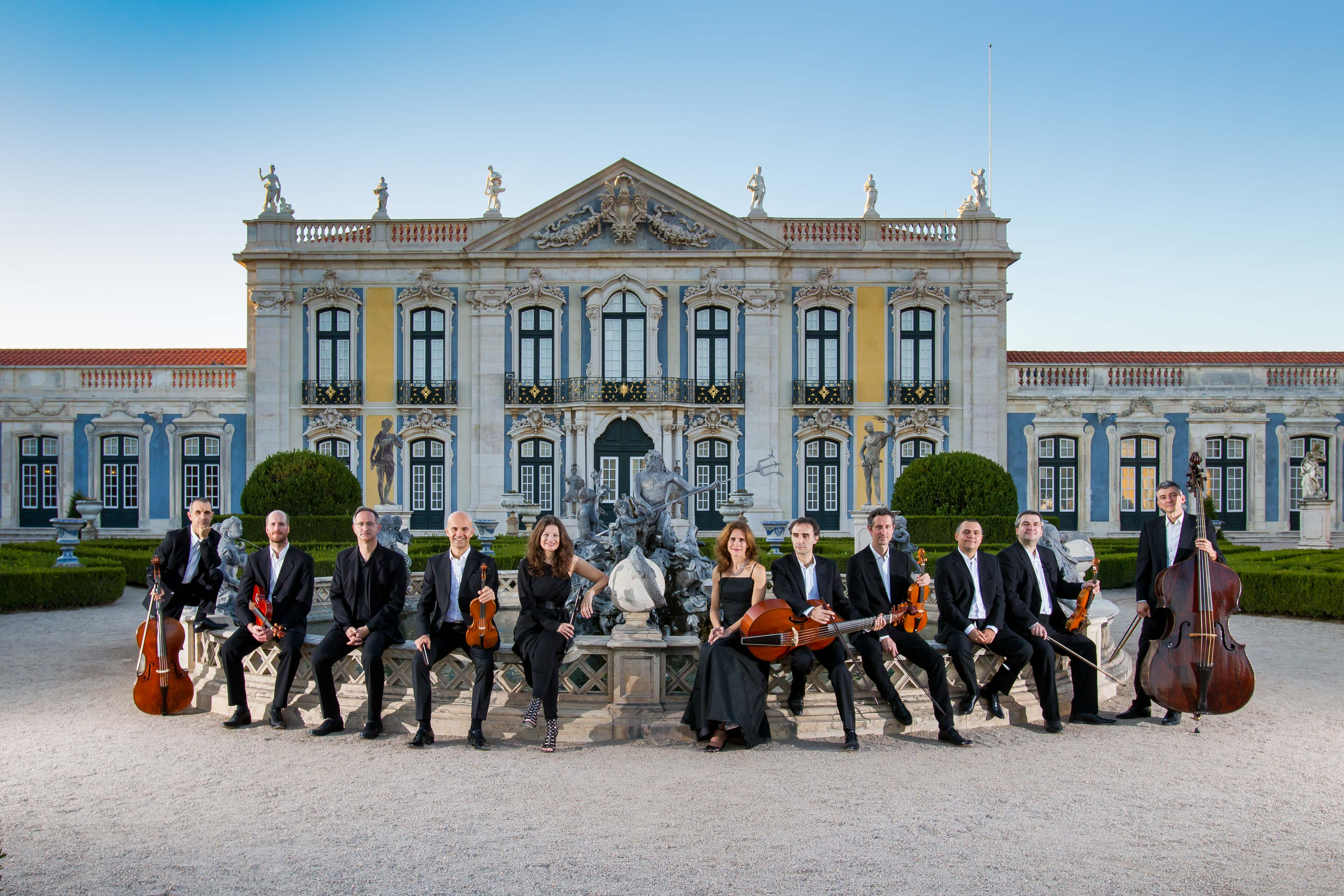
Il Suonar Parlante Orchestra (Foto Duarte)

His ensemble, Il Suonar Parlante Orchestra, is a creative community of soloists, devoted to a new investigation of the early music and classical repertoire as well as to the creation of new musical realities. Besides the classical repertoire, the ensemble has performed and created new projects with important jazz players such as Kenny Wheeler, Uri Caine, Jim Black, Don Byron, Markus Stockhausen, Nguyen Lê and Achille Succi; jazz and blues singers such as Cristina Zavalloni and Barbara Walker; pop singers like Vinicio Capossela; and flamenco stars such as Carmen Linares. Several composers have written new music for Il Suonar Parlante Orchestra. The ensemble also collaborates with traditional Asian musicians like the Afghan virtuosi of "Ensemble Kaboul" (Khaled Arman).

- Like an army made just of the strongest generals, in IL SUONAR PARLANTE ORCHESTRA each member is able of the highest solistic performances. (Mittelbayerische Zeitung).

Vittorio Ghielmi performed, in duo with his brother Lorenzo Ghielmi (organ, piano, harpsichord) or with the lutenist Luca Pianca, in the most important halls (Musikverein and Konzerthaus Wien, Berliner Philharmoniker Hall, Casals Hall Tokio etc.).

As soloist or chamber musician, he has shared the stage since early youth with artists such as Gustav Leonhardt (duo), Cecilia Bartoli, Andràs Schiff, Thomas Quasthoff, Mario Brunello, Viktoria Mullova, Giuliano Carmignola, Reinhard Goebel, Giovanni Antonini, Ottavio Dantone, Enrico Bronzi etc. Over three nights in 2009, he gave a performance of Forqueray's complete works for viola da gamba at De Bijloke, Ghent (B).He has been artist in residence at Musikfest Stuttgart 2010, the Segovia festival 2011, and the Bozar Bruxelles 2011, Gliwice All'improvviso festival 2025.

Vittorio Ghielmi (foto Orlando Bonaldo)

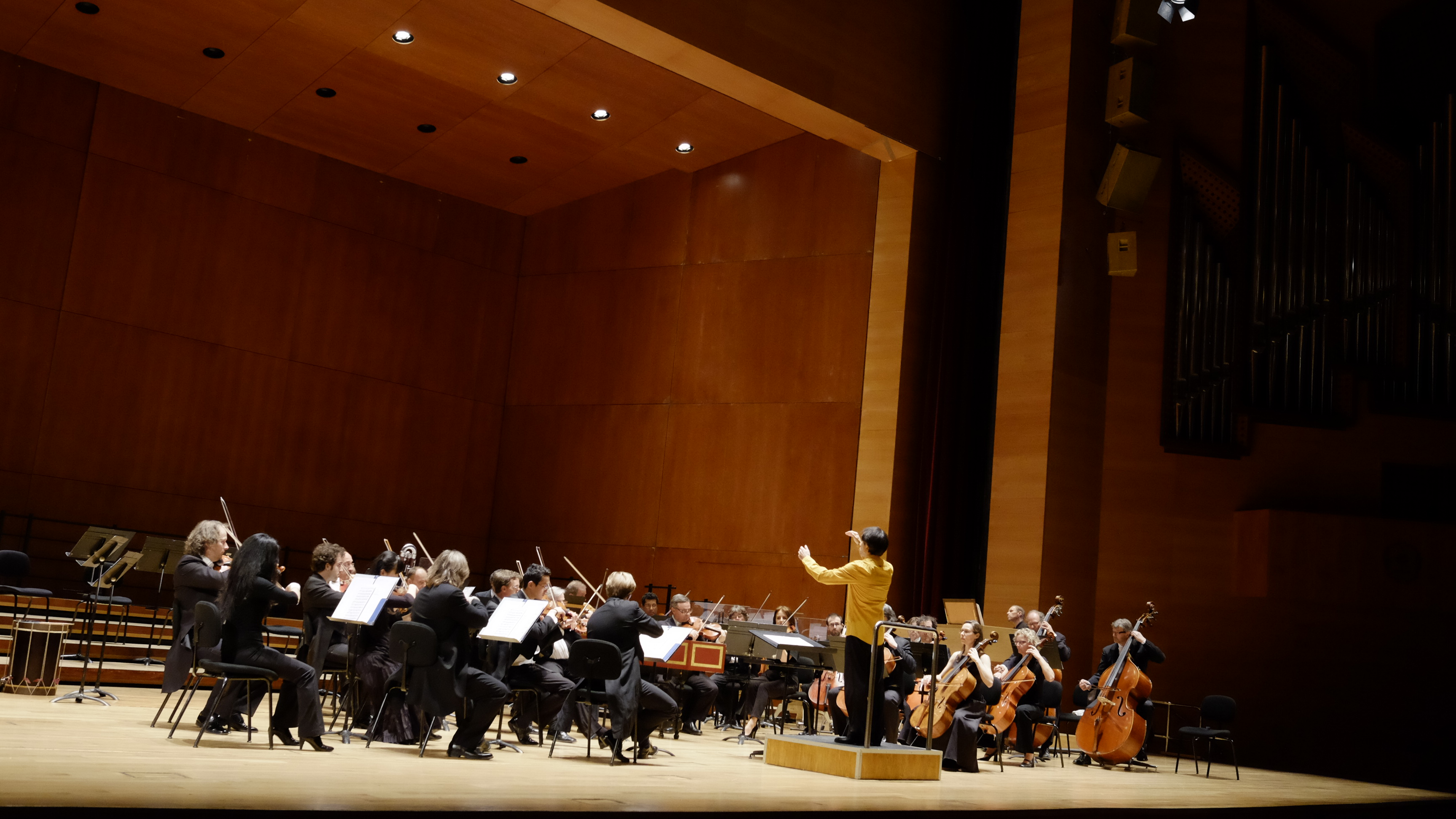
Vittorio Ghielmi, Orquesta Ciudad de Granada.

In 2007 he conceived with the Argentinian singer Graciela Gibelli and conducted a show, based on Buxtehude's "Membra Jesu Nostri", with the American film maker Marc Reshovsky (Hollywood) and the Swedish choir "Rilke Ensemble" (G.Eriksson); the project was produced by the Semana de musica religiosa de Cuenca (Madrid) and brought later to the Musikfest Stuttgart in 2010. In 2012 he conducted Handel's Water music at the Portogruaro Festival (Venice) with a spectacle on the river Lemene conceived by Monique Arnaud. In 2018 he conducted the Opera Pygmalion by Rameau at the Drottningholms Slottsteater (Stockholm), with the régie of Saburo Teshigawara; the new, original conception of this spectacle was so described in the Financial Times (3 August 2018): "In their new production for Drottningholm Slottsteater, the Japanese dancer and choreographer Saburo Teshigawara and Italian conductor and viola da gamba player Vittorio Ghielmi create a genuine masterpiece which combines exquisite music-making with experimental dance and modern lighting effects with the theatre’s unique 18th-century stage technology. Indeed, it is some time since the theatre has been so marvellously and innovatively put to use.“ In 2025 he conducted “Nozze di Figaro” (Teatro Accademico, Castelfranco Veneto), “Giuditta” by A. Scarlatti (Accademia Chigiana di Siena), Griselda by A. Scarlatti (Regie Tomasz Cyz, Ruins of Thatre Victoria, Gliwice, Poland).

Ghielmi's collaboration with traditional players and in particular with the Sardinian traditional singers of the Cuncordu de Orosei, which lead him to a new insight in the European ancient music, is documented in the film The Heart of Sound, BFMI (Salzburg-Hollywood).(Medici TV)

He has made many recordings, winning many prizes (for labels such as Winter&Winter, Harmonia Mundi, Teldec, Decca, Sony, Auvidis, Opus 111, Passacaille, Alpha Outhere) covering all the musical styles and the entire viol repertoire; four CDs are dedicated to the virtuosic gamba concerti by Johan Gottlieb Graun (1702-1771). Recently published (2018) is the Cd Gypsy Baroque with the singer Graciela Gibelli, the cymbalist Marcel Comendant, and the violinist improviser Stanislav Palúch. and Le Secret de Monsieur Marais, (Outhere, Paris).

In addition to his activity as an instrumentalist and conductor, he has often been in demand as an arranger and composer. The cd The Passion of Musick (with Dorothee Oberlinger), dedicated to "celtic" music and containing his arrangements and compositions won in 2015 the ECHO Klassic Preis.

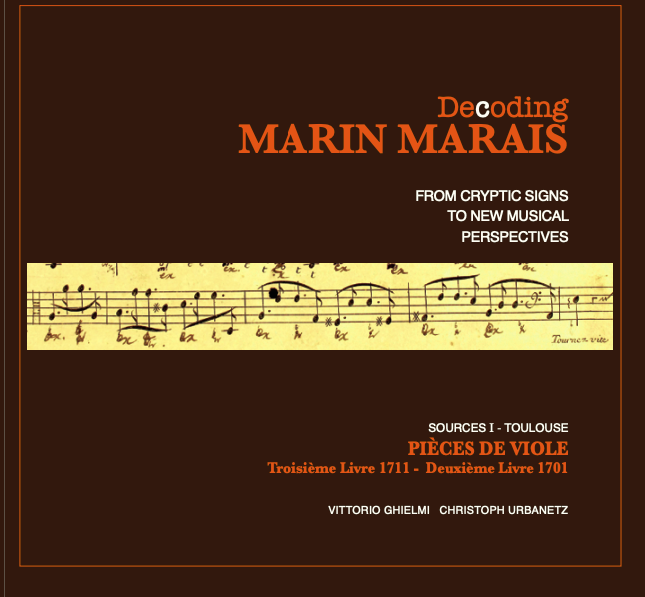
https://www.facebook.com/libroforte.finemusicbooks/

He is Professor for viola da gamba and Head of the Department für Alte Musik at the Mozarteum Universität Salzburg and visiting professor at the Royal College of London. He is graduate (Docteur ès lettres) at the Università Cattolica di Milano. He was born in Milan, Italy, where as a child he began his study of music with the violin (with Dora Piatti and Angelo Leone), the double bass (with Carlo Capriata, former first double bass of La Scala theatre) and later the viola da gamba, conducting and composition. In 1995 he was the winner of the "Concorso Internazionale Romano Romanini per strumenti ad arco" (Brescia). His fieldwork within early musical traditions surviving in forgotten parts of the world and bringing new perspectives to the interpretation of European "early music" led to him being presented the "Erwin Bodky Award" (Cambridge, Massachusetts USA 1997). He studied the viol with Roberto Gini (Accademia Internazionale della Musica, Milano), Wieland Kuijken (Conservatoire Royale, Bruxelles) and Christophe Coin (Paris). Associations with instrument maker, engineer and humanist Luc Breton (CH) as well as with many musicians of non-European traditions (India, Afghanistan, Latin America) have been fundamental to his musical career, creating a deeper reflexion on the nature of sound used in early and modern European tradition (classical music).

Vittorio Ghielmi, besides his professorship at the Mozarteum Universität in Salzburg, regularly gives master-classes in Academies and Universities all over the world (Juilliard School, Royal College London, Sincletica University Barcelona, Conservatoire Royale Brussels, Akademie der Kunst Berlin etc.). In the "Politecnico della cultura, delle arti e delle lingue" in Milan, he has organised series of conferences and concerts focused on the early music instrumental techniques and their survival in "ethnic" musical traditions. Since 2018 he organises with Mozarteum university and the Accademia Chigiana (Siena) a series of Concerts and Masterclasses for classical players approaching ancient music (Chigiana-Mozarteum Baroque Project). He is artistic director (team) of the ORA Festival for early music in Salzburg. He has published studies and articles on music and previously unpublished scores (Fuzeau, Minkoff, Ut Orpheus), as well as a method for viola da gamba known throughout the world (with Paolo Biordi). He is currently publishing a complete edition of Johann Gottlieb Graun's Viola da Gamba concertos and directs the musical research of "Libroforte-Fine Music Editions" and a musicological book about the "secret signs„ of Marin Marais in collaboration with Christoph Urbanetz. Vittorio Ghielmi plays a bass viol made by Michel Colichon, Paris 1688 and one made by Luc Breton (Morges 2007).

== Basic discography ==
- Bagpipes from Hell – Music for Viola da gamba, Lyra-viol, Lute, and Ceterone. 17th and 18th century (Vittorio Ghielmi, Luca Pianca, 1999)
- Pièces de caractère – Works by: Marais, Forqueray, Mouton, Dollé, Caix d'Hervelois, De Visée (Vittorio Ghielmi, Luca Pianca, 2002)
- Short Tales for a Viol – English lyra-viol music of the 17th century (Vittorio Ghielmi)
- Duo – German Music for Lute & Viol (Vittorio Ghielmi, Luca Pianca)
- Full of Colour (V. Ghielmi, E. Reijseger, Il Suonar Parlante)
- Johann Sebastian Bach – Preludi ai corali (Vittorio Ghielmi, Italian Viola da Gamba Quartet)
- Telemann, Georg Philipp – Chamber Music with Viola Da Gamba (Ensemble Baroque de Limoges)
- Devil's Dream (Ghielmi, Pianca, Gibelli)
- Johann Sebastian Bach – Sonatas, Preludes and Fugues
- Villa Medici – Nata per la musica Bern, Beschi, Caine
- Carl Philipp Emanuel Bach – Lieder zum singen bey dem Clavier
- Johann Gottlieb Graun – Konzertante Musik mit Viola da Gamba
- J. S. Bach: Sonatas for Viola da Gamba & Harpsichord, Vittorio Ghielmi (viola da gamba), Lorenzo Ghielmi (fortepiano). Also includes Bach Preludes & Fugues, 1998, [Lorenzo is Vittorio's older brother]
- C. P. E. Bach: Lieder – Zum singen bey dem clavier — Ursula Fiedler (Soprano) Lorenzo Ghielmi (Clavier), Vittorio Ghielmi (viola da gamba), Ars Musici, 1999
- Der Kastanienball – Vittorio Ghielmi, Il Suonar Parlante – Prinzregenten Theater, Munchen, Germany (2004).
- Dalla Casa: Il Secondo Libro dei Madrigali – Il Terzo Suono Balconi, Dalla Casa, Fabris, Fagotto, Fedi
- Graun: Concerti – Ponseele, Il Gardellino Ensemble
- Graun: Concerti CPO
- Marin Marais: La Force et la Douceur, Pièces de viole, V. Ghielmi and Luca Pianca, Passacaille, 2010
- Barbarian Beauty, Concertos for viola da gamba and orchestra, (Graun, Telemann, Tartini and Vivaldi: the gypsy side), with Marcel Comendant (cymbalon), Dorothee Oberlinger recorder, M.Hirasaki, violin and "Il Suonar Parlante Orchestra", Passacaille 2011
- La Force et la douceur, Music by Marin Marais, Vittorio Ghielmi and Luca Pianca, Passacaille ed. Marais : La Force et la douceur. Ghielmi, Pianca.
- Forqueray le diable Vittorio Ghielmi, Lorenzo Ghielmi, Rodney Prada, Luca Pianca, Passacaille ed.
- Gypsy Baroque, Alpha, Vittorio Ghielmi IL SUONAR PARLANTE ORCHESTRA, Gypsy Baroque | Outhere Music
- "Le Secret de Marais", Alpha, Vittorio Ghielmi IL SUONAR PARLANTE ORCHESTRA, Le secret de Monsieur Marais

With Uri Caine

- The Goldberg Variations (Winter & Winter, 2000)
