= David Moss (musician) =

American jazz musician

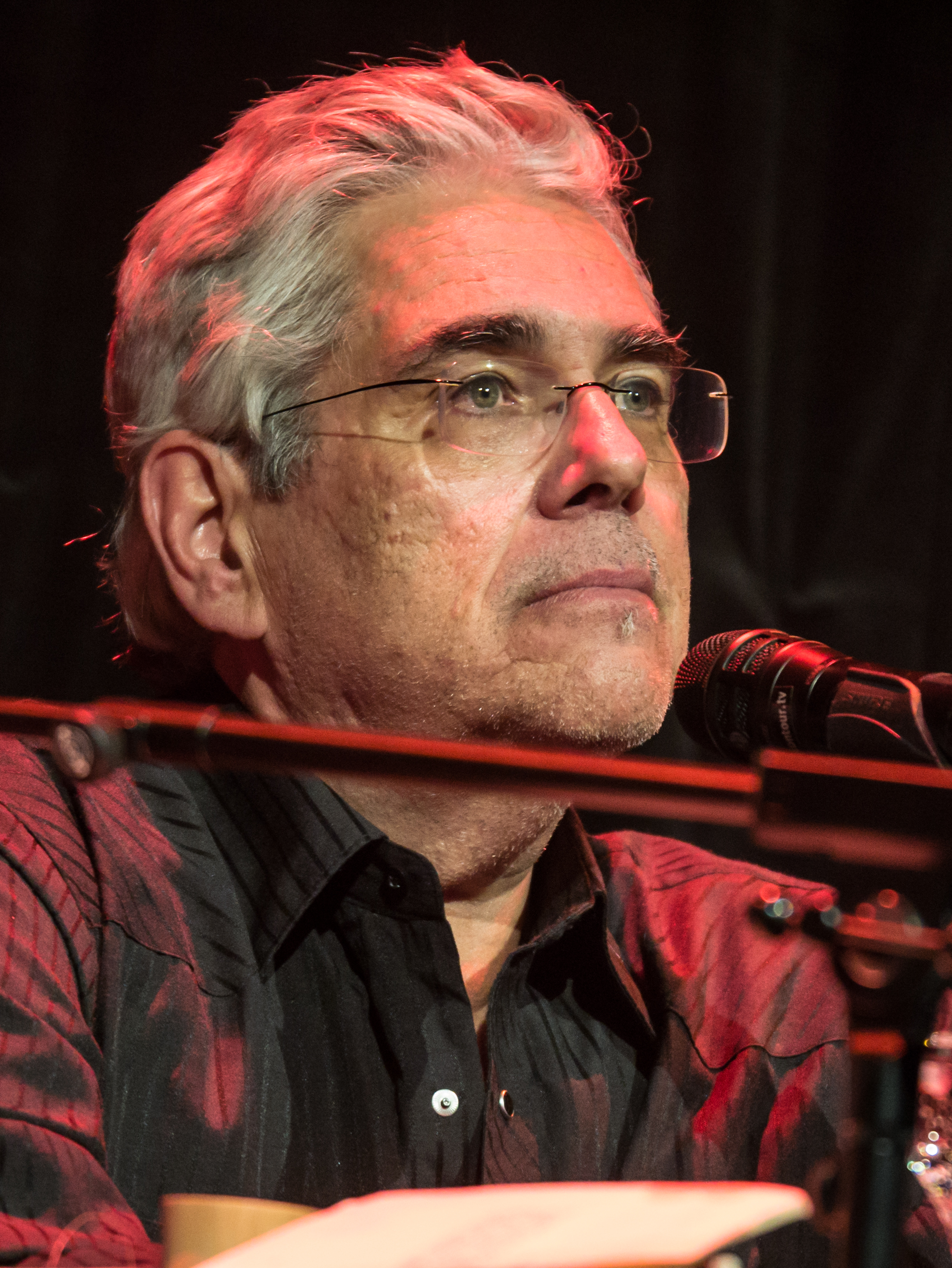
David Moss at the Moers Festival 2017

David Moss (born January 21, 1949, in New York City) is an American composer, percussionist and self-taught vocalist, founder of the David Moss Dense Band; co-founder and artistic director of the Institute for Living Voice, Antwerp. His performances are noted for their innovative style, multimedia approach and improvisation. Moss has lived in Berlin, Germany since 1991, when he received a fellowship from the prestigious Berlin Artist Program of the DAAD.

== Biography ==
Between 1963 and 1968 Moss studied percussion at Hartt College of Music and Hartford Symphony with Joe Porcaro, Al Lepak, Richard Lepore. In the following years he took percussion with Tanjore Ranganathan at Wesleyan University and composition with Bill Dixon at Bennington College.

From 1971 to 1973, Moss played percussion for the Bill Dixon Ensemble. In the early 1980s he played on the first album by The Golden Palominos.

Since his education has finished, he performed in many cities worldwide; in 1991 and 1992 he received Guggenheim and DAAD fellowships in Berlin.

== Discography ==
- Coessential with Baird Hersey (Bent, 1977)
- Terrain (Cornpride, 1980)
- Percussion Interchanges (Ictus, 1981)
- Full House (Moers, 1984)
- Dense Band (Moers, 1985)
- My Favorite Things (Intakt, 1991)
- The Day We Forgot (No Man's Land, 1991)
- All at Once at Any Time (Victo, 1994)
- Moss Tales (The Listening Room, 1995)
- Time Stories (Intakt, 1998)
- 2 For Tea (Long Arms Records, 1998) with Sergey Kuryokhin
- Fragmentary Blues with Michael Rodach (Traumton, 1999)
- Vocal Village Project (Intakt, 2002)
- Sogna Suite (Atopos, 2006)
- Koans Vol. 2 (Ictus, 2006)

With Uri Caine

- Love Fugue: Robert Schumann (Winter & Winter, 2000)
- The Goldberg Variations (Winter & Winter, 2000)
