= Ralph Peterson Jr. =

American jazz drummer (1962–2021)

- Born: May 20, 1962; Pleasantville, New Jersey, U.S.
- Died: March 1, 2021 (aged 58) Dartmouth, Massachusetts, U.S.
- Genre: Jazz
- Occupation: Musician
- Instrument: Drums

Ralph Peterson Jr. (May 20, 1962 – March 1, 2021) was an American jazz drummer, composer, teacher, and bandleader.

== Early life ==
Peterson's father, Ralph Peterson, Sr., was the first black police chief and first black mayor of Pleasantville, New Jersey, where Peterson was raised. Four of Peterson's uncles and his grandfather were drummers, and Peterson himself began on percussion at age three. Peterson played trumpet at Pleasantville High School and worked locally in funk groups. He applied to Livingston College at Rutgers University to study drums, but he failed the percussion entrance exam and enrolled as a trumpeter instead, graduating in 1984.

== Career ==
In 1983, he joined Art Blakey's Jazz Messengers as the group's second drummer. Chosen by Blakey himself to fill the drum chair, Peterson remained with Blakey until the jazz legend’s 1990 death. He dedicated a 1994 Ralph Peterson Quintet album, Art, to the repertoire of his mentor. He worked with Terence Blanchard and Donald Harrison in 1984, and with Walter Davis (1985, 1989), Tom Harrell (1985), Out of the Blue (1985–1988), Branford Marsalis (1986), David Murray, Craig Harris (1987), James Spaulding (1988), Roy Hargrove (1989), Jon Faddis (1989), Dewey Redman, Mark Helias (1989), and Wynton Marsalis (with the Count Basie ghost band).

During the 1990s, Peterson played as a sideman with Jack Walrath, Craig Handy, Charles Lloyd, Kip Hanrahan (1992), Bheki Mseleku, Courtney Pine, Steve Coleman, George Colligan, Stanley Cowell, Mark Shim, and Betty Carter.

He began recording as a leader in 1988, with a quintet (Terence Blanchard, Steve Wilson, Geri Allen, and Phil Bowler) on V and Volition. He also worked with Allen and Bowler as a trio in "Triangular"; Essiet Essiet replaced Bowler for the 1988 Triangular recording. In 1989 he recorded in the quartet format as "The Fo'tet" with Don Byron, Steve Wilson (later Bobby Franchesini), Melissa Slocum (later Belden Bullock), and Bryan Carrott. After living in Canada for some time, he returned to Philadelphia, where he worked again with "The Fo'tet,” and recorded as Triangular 2 with Slocum and Uri Caine. He also led the group "Hip Pocket,” with whom he played trumpet.

On May 21, 2021, Peterson’s Onyx Productions released Raise Up Off Me, Peterson’s final full-length album. Comprising five Peterson originals and compositions by Zaccai Curtis, Bud Powell, James Williams (musician), Patrice Rushen, and John Hicks, the album was hailed as Peterson’s “closing statement.” In the liner notes, Orrin Evans tied Peterson’s music to his life:

If you knew Ralph Peterson, you knew whenever he titled a song or album, it directly correlated to something going on in his life. Art (1994, Blue Note) was Ralph’s tribute to his mentor, Art Blakey, who had just passed. Reclamation Project (1995, Evidence) was his way of telling us he was reclaiming his life and career. “The Trials of Trust and Treachery” off of Subliminal Seduction (2002, Criss Cross) was his homage to the difficulty but importance of long-term relationships. While Raise Up Off Me can easily be associated with 2020, the Black Lives Matter Movement, and the pandemic, the message I hear is Ralph’s fight to LIVE!

== Technique ==
Peterson’s style was described as “passionate precision,” fusing the swing and energy of a hurricane with consistent and grounded time. Others described his play as having “agile dynamism, lunging propulsion, and risk with triumph. He was also known for “long, cyclical polyrhythms.”

Peterson believed that music programs “pushing kids to have their own style” was problematic; He claimed not to have a style of his own; “My style is copying the style of the people I love and the way I combine it and that’s nothing more.” Though he conceded that he did have an identifiable style based on his subjective choices in adapting others’ styles, he did not believe that one should self-consciously try to develop their own style, but rather let that style naturally emerge as a synthesis of their influences and experiences.

== Influences and Teaching Philosophy ==
Coming to the fore in the 1980s as a member of the Young Lions, a cohort of musicians tied to the neo-bop movement, Peterson acknowledged the influence of Art Blakey. Dubbed Blakey’s protégé, torchbearer, and “anointed heir,” Peterson emulated elements of Blakey’s playing style, including his snare drum press-roll crescendo, confident that this didn’t limit his own artistic vision. Peterson also acknowledged having apprenticed under Elvin Jones, singer Betty Carter and pianist Walter Davis Jr. He credited Davis, who gave him his first gig in New York, with instilling in him the importance of brushwork.

Peterson praised Alan Dawson’s teaching and developed the veteran drummer’s Rudiment Ritual using the principles of three part-writing to incorporate parallel, contrary, and oblique motion. As a Berklee instructor, Peterson emphasized the importance of customizing his instruction to each student, making adjustments for those who had a stronger work ethic or could more easily absorb information; he refused to hold a student back “based on a pre-described formula.”

Peterson encouraged his students to “learn tunes” and not to be dependent on the Real Book, a popular collection of lead sheets, which he claimed was “60 percent wrong,” and that reliance on the book would limit students’ learning of application. Just using the book, he claimed, wouldn’t teach the syntax and language of the music; this could only be learned by listening to recordings. By the same token, one could learn the melody from the Real Book, but to hear how it was “most creatively improvised on,” one would need to listen to records.

To provide students with this “basic language,” Peterson created a course entitled Jazz Drum Set Repertoire which required students to learn 50 songs in 15 weeks. Though some said that this was asking too much of students, Peterson insisted that it was not. “I usually disseminate five tunes a week. Five tunes a week is not a lot. That's one tune a day with two days off!” This was part of Peterson’s imperative to “internalize” the music, so that students could be ready to perform or record a composition with only 24 hours’ notice:

The practical application of learning tunes quickly is like so: if I get a call today- it's Thursday- for recording on Saturday... the best a band leader can do is next day mail us the music. Or I suppose with email you could get the music by tonight. Right? Fine. We can see and hear the music tonight. Right? But the best we have is 24 hours to learn the music. And you need to be ready to record on Saturday!

Ultimately, Peterson taught a holistic conception of musicianship, involving “hearing and playing beyond the drum set. Understanding form, melody, harmony, and phrasing all have a profound effect on what a drummer plays.” Peterson’s Berklee students included Ari Hoenig, E.J Strickland, Tyshawn Sorey, Johnathan Blake, Mark Whitfield Jr., Kush Abadey and Justin Faulkner. He also mentored the jazz writer Nate Chinen.

== Personal life ==
Peterson taught at the University of the Arts in Philadelphia and Boston’s Berklee College of Music, where he started in 2003. In 2010, Peterson started his own Onyx Productions Music Label.

In his twenties, Peterson struggled with drug addiction, though after achieving sobriety used his difficulties to “help those coming up behind him, either as a compass point or a cautionary tale.”

In addition to his musical work, Peterson ran a Boston taekwondo studio for many years and was ranked as a fifth dan black belt in 2019.

Peterson died at his home in Dartmouth, Massachusetts, after a six-year battle with cancer on March 1, 2021, at age 58. He was survived by his wife Linea, daughter Sonora Slocum, stepdaughters Saydee and Haylee McQuay, and his spiritual daughter Jazz Robertson.

== Discography ==
=== As leader ===
- V (Blue Note, 1988)
- Triangular (Blue Note, 1989) – rec. 1988
- Volition (Blue Note, 1990) – rec. 1989
- Ralph Peterson Presents the Fo'tet (Somethin' Else, 1990)
- Ornettology (Somethin' Else, 1991)
- Art (Blue Note, 1993)
- The Reclamation Project (Evidence, 1995)
- The Fo'tet Plays Monk (Evidence, 1997)
- Back to Stay (Sirocco, 1999)
- Triangular 2 (Sirocco, 2000)
- The Art of War (Criss Cross Jazz, 2001)
- Subliminal Seduction (Criss Cross Jazz, 2002)
- Tests of Time (Criss Cross Jazz, 2003)
- The Fo'tet Augmented (Criss Cross Jazz, 2004)
- Outer Reaches (Onyx, 2010)
- The Duality Perspective (Onyx, 2012)
- Alive at Firehouse 12 Vol. 1 (Onyx, 2013)
- Alive at Firehouse 12 Vol. 2: Fo' n Mo (Onyx, 2016)
- Triangular III (Onyx, 2016)
- Dream Deferred (Onyx, 2016)
- I Remember Bu: Alive Vol. 4 @ Scullers (Onyx, 2018)
- Inward Venture: Alive Vol. 5 At The Side Door (Onyx 2018)
- Legacy Alive Vol. 6 at the Side Door (Onyx, 2019)
- Listen Up! (Onyx, 2019)
- Onward & Upward (Onyx, 2020)
- Raise Up Off Me (Onyx, 2021)

=== As sideman ===
With Don Byron

- Tuskegee Experiments (Nonesuch, 1992)
- Music for Six Musicians (Nonesuch, 1995)

With Uri Caine

- Sphere Music (Winter & Winter, 2005)
- Toys (JMT, 1995)
- Blue Wail (Winter & Winter, 1999)
- The Goldberg Variations (Winter & Winter, 2000)

With George Colligan

- Activism (SteepleChase, 1996)
- Ultimatum (Criss Cross, 2002)

With Wayne Escoffery

- Intuition (Nagel Heyer, 2004)
- Live at Smalls (SmallsLIVE, 2015)
- Vortex (Sunnyside, 2018)
- The Humble Warrior (Smoke Sessions, 2020)

With Duane Eubanks

- My Shining Hour (TCB, 1999)
- Second Take (TCB, 2001)

With Orrin Evans

- Captain Black (Criss Cross, 1998)
- Grown Folk Bizness (Criss Cross, 1999)
- Mother's Touch (Posi-Tone, 2014)

With Craig Handy

- Split Second Timing (Arabesque, 1992)
- Introducing Three for All + One (Arabesque, 1993)

With Charles Lloyd

- Notes from Big Sur (ECM, 1992)
- Quartets (ECM, 2013)

With David Murray

- New Life (Black Saint, 1987)
- Lovers (DIW, 1988)
- I Want to Talk About You (Black Saint, 1989)
- Deep River (DIW, 1989)
- Ballads (DIW, 1990)
- Spirituals (DIW, 1990)
- Hope Scope (Black Saint, 1991)
- Tenors (DIW, 1993)

With Jeremy Pelt

- Profile (Fresh Sound, 2002)
- Insight (Criss Cross, 2003)

With others

- Melissa Aldana, Free Fall (Inner Circle Music, 2010)
- Pat Bianchi, Back Home (Doodlin, 2010)
- Terence Blanchard, Discernment (Bellaphon, 1986)
- Don Braden, Contemporary Standards Ensemble (Double-Time, 2000)
- Anthony Branker, Spirit Songs (Sons of Sound, 2005)
- Stanley Cowell, Mandara Blossoms (SteepleChase, 1996)
- Anthony Cox, Factor of Faces (Minor Music, 1993)
- Walter Davis Jr., Scorpio Rising (SteepleChase, 1989)
- Jon Faddis, Into the Faddisphere (Epic, 1989)
- Kip Hanrahan, Exotica (American Clave, 1992)
- Roy Hargrove, Diamond in the Rough (Novus/RCA, 1990)
- Tom Harrell, Moon Alley (Criss Cross, 1986)
- Craig Harris, Blackout in the Square Root of Soul (JMT, 1988)
- Donald Harrison, Nascence (CBS, 1986)
- Sean Jones, Eternal Journey (Mack Avenue, 2004)
- Frank Lowe, Soul Folks No More (No. 10, 2001)
- Carmen Lundy, This Is Carmen Lundy (Afrasia, 2001)
- Branford Marsalis, Royal Garden Blues (CBS, 1986)
- Delfeayo Marsalis, An Evening with Delfeayo Marsalis Kalamazoo (Troubadour Jass, 2017)
- Bheki Mseleku, Beauty of Sunrise (Verve, 1997)
- Jamaaladeen Tacuma, Groove 2000 (Caramelle, 1998)
- James Spaulding, Gotstabe a Better Way! (Muse, 1990)
- Michele Rosewoman, Occasion to Rise (Somethin' Else, 1991)
- Mark Shim, Mind Over Matter (Blue Note, 1998)
- Bobby Watson, Quiet As It's Kept (Red Record, 1999)

== Sources ==
- Gary W. Kennedy, "Ralph Peterson Jr.". Grove Jazz online.
- Scott Yanow, Ralph Peterson at Allmusic
- Giovanni Rusonello (March 7, 2021). "Ralph Peterson Jr., Jazz Drummer and Bandleader, Dies at 58". The New York Times. Retrieved March 7, 2021.
- Jeff Schwachter. "A Musical Homecoming for Ralph Peterson; From Pleasantville to Blakey to Berklee and beyond, Ralph Peterson's life in jazz comes full circle with new album and Father's Day concert in Atlantic City." Archived 2014-08-19 at the Wayback Machine, Atlantic City Weekly, June 13, 2012.
- George Colligan. "The Ralph Peterson Interview."
- Berklee staff. "In Memoriam: Ralph Peterson, Jr."
- Nate Chinen. NPR.org. "Ralph Peterson Jr., Drummer Who Re-Enlivened Hard Bop, Dead At 58."
- Bill Milkowski. "Ralph Peterson: 'The Music is Why I'm Here.'" DownBeat. December 13, 2018.
- Brian Zimmerman. "Drummer Ralph Peterson Jr., Torchbearer for the Jazz Messengers, Dies at 58." JAZZIZ Magazine. Retrieved 1 March 2021.
