= Blue Wail =

Studio album by Uri Caine Trio
- Released: February 9, 1999
- Recorded: December 1–2, 1997
- Studio: Avatar, New York City
- Genre: Jazz
- Length: 62:25
- Label: Winter & Winter 910 034-2
- Producer: Joe Ferla & Stefan Winter

Uri Caine chronology
Wagner e Venezia (1997)	Blue Wail (1999)	The Sidewalks of New York: Tin Pan Alley (1999)

Blue Wail is an album by pianist Uri Caine that was released on the Winter & Winter label in 1999.

== Reception ==
Professional ratings
Review scores
Source	Rating
Allmusic	4.5/5 stars
Tom Hull	B+
The Penguin Guide to Jazz Recordings	3.5/4 stars

In his review for Allmusic, David R. Adler notes that "Caine and company imbue every tune with an extraordinary blues feeling and a fat swing groove. But this is not just another straight-ahead piano trio outing. Caine gives the form a shot in the arm with these sophisticated compositions, all of which contain a bevy of surprises. Blue Wail is on the whole an aggressive, burning album". On All About Jazz, C. Michael Bailey said "Blue Wail might, at first listen, be just a pedestrian Post Bop piano trio gig. Maybe that, if it was not for Uri Caine's enormous talent and musicality... Uri Caine is the type of musician who is going to produce a body of significant music that for a time will lie just beyond the mainstream, pulling the mainstream with it". JazzTimes reviewer, Harvey Pekar, observed "Caine swings easily and has a nice, light touch here, drawing his style from many sources, including McCoy Tyner, Wynton Kelly and several classical composers. He blends these influences skillfully, but doesn't cover new ground; in fact his playing wouldn't have been considered particularly modern fifteen years ago. Most jazz pianists don't come close to accomplishing what Caine's been able to do, and I enjoy listening to his work on this CD".

== Track listing ==
All compositions were by Uri Caine, except as indicated.

1. "Honeysuckle Rose" (Fats Waller) – 4:03
2. "Loose Trade" – 5:33
3. "The Face of Space" – 6:21
4. "Digature of the Line" – 4:55
5. "Blue Wail" – 8:35
6. "Stain" – 5:48
7. "Sweet Potato" – 9:19
8. "Bones Don't Cry" – 5:15
9. "Poem for Shulamit" – 4:45
10. "Fireball" – 3:37
11. "Honeysuckle Rose" (Waller) – 4:14

== Personnel ==
- Uri Caine – piano
- James Genus – bass
- Ralph Peterson, Jr. – drums
