= Uri Caine Ensemble Plays Mozart =

Live album by Uri Caine Ensemble
- Released: 2006
- Recorded: June 16–18, 2006
- Venues: Holland Festival, Amstel Church, Amsterdam, the Netherlands
- Genres: Classical music, Jazz
- Length: 65:15
- Label: Winter & Winter 910 049-2
- Producer: Stefan Winter

Uri Caine chronology
Things (2006)	Uri Caine Ensemble Plays Mozart (2006)	Moloch: Book of Angels Volume 6 (2006)

Uri Caine Ensemble Plays Mozart is a live album by pianist Uri Caine's Ensemble performing works written by Wolfgang Amadeus Mozart recorded in 2006 and released on the Winter & Winter label. It was recorded at the Amstel church in Amsterdam as part of the 60th Holland Festival.

== Reception ==
Professional ratings
Review scores
Source	Rating
AllMusic	3/5 stars
All About Jazz	4.5/5 stars
Tom Hull	B+

In his review for AllMusic, Jonathan Widran said, "the album swings mercurially from mood, paying strict homage at times but also reminding the listener that centuries have passed and it's time for new twists on the sacred. One's enjoyment will depend solely on his or her passion for tradition, but overall, for the adventurous, Plays Mozart is worth at least one test spin". On All About Jazz Troy Collins said, "Working in klezmer and Dixieland variations, as well as free jazz, psychedelic rock and even subtle electronica, Caine can seem mighty irreverent to the old guard. But he also contributes pieces of unflagging beauty and tenderness, proving his point that all forms (from the sacred to the profane) can exist on the same plane, if only one allows them". JazzTimes's reviewer, Andrew Lindemann Malone, observed, "Caine’s playful deconstructions and augmentations deliver tons of delightful surprises".

== Track listing ==
All compositions by Wolfgang Amadeus Mozart

1. "Piano Sonata in C major" (K. 545) first movement – 3:47
2. "Symphony 40 in G minor" (K. 550) first movement – 12:58
3. "Symphony 41 in C major" (K. 551) second movement – 10:17
4. "Clarinet Quintet in A major" (K. 581) fourth movement – 7:46
5. "Piano Sonata in C major" (K. 545) second movement – 7:57
6. "Sinfonia Concertante in E♭ major" (K. 364) third movement – 6:38
7. "Batti, Batti, o bel Masetto", aria Zerlina, act 1 from Don Giovanni (K. 527) – 8:50
8. "Bei Männern, welche Liebe fühlen", duet Pamina/Papageno, act 1, and "Der Hölle Rache kocht in meinem Herzen", aria Königin der Nacht, act 1 from Die Zauberflöte (K. 620) – 5:47
9. "Turkish Rondo from Piano Sonata in A major" (K. 331) – 8:27
10. "Piano Sonata in C major" (K. 545) third movement – 3:44

== Personnel ==
- Uri Caine – piano, arranger
- Ralph Alessi – trumpet
- Chris Speed – clarinet
- Joyce Hammann – violin
- Nguyên Lê – guitar
- DJ Olive – turntables
- Drew Gress – double bass
- Jim Black – drums
