= Solitaire (Uri Caine album) =

Studio album by Uri Caine
- Released: 2001
- Recorded: November 22–23, 2000; Schloss Elmau, Germany
- Genre: Jazz
- Length: 68:16
- Label: Winter & Winter 910 075-2
- Producer: Stefan Winter

Uri Caine chronology
Bedrock 3 (2001)	Solitaire (2001)	Rio (2001)

Solitaire is a 2001 solo album by pianist Uri Caine. It was released on the Winter & Winter label.

== Reception ==
Professional ratings
Review scores
Source	Rating
AllMusic	4/5 stars
The Penguin Guide to Jazz	3.5/4 stars
Tom Hull	B

In his review for AllMusic, David R. Adler notes that "Solitaire, the first solo piano album by Uri Caine, is a tour de force… Here, with nothing but 88 keys to work with, he makes music as electrifying as anything in his catalog". On All About Jazz C. Michael Bailey said "The music is a bit indescribable, as its depth and breath are immense. Suffice it to say that the recording is a bit like an Avant Guard [sic] Classical recital where the performer has a stream-of-consciousness conversation with the instrument and we, the audience, are eaves-dropping".

== Track listing ==
All compositions by Uri Caine unless otherwise indicated.

1. "Say It in French" - 3:23
2. "As I Am" - 3:27
3. "Roll On" - 5:19
4. "Sonia Said" - 4:51
5. "Beartoes" - 4:53
6. "Inhaling You" - 4:09
7. "Hamsin" - 4:20
8. "Solitaire" - 5:22
9. "The Call" - 6:20
10. "Snort" - 3:52
11. "All the Way" (Sammy Cahn, Jimmy Van Heusen) - 4:15
12. "Twelve" - 3:53
13. "Blackbird" (John Lennon, Paul McCartney) - 6:03
14. "Anaconda" - 5:35
15. "Country Life" - 2:25

== Personnel ==
- Uri Caine - piano
