= Wagner e Venezia =

Live album by Uri Caine Ensemble
- Released: 1997
- Recorded: June 6–9, 1997
- Venues: Gran Caffé Quadri, Piazza San Marco, and Hotel Metropol, Riva Schiavoni, Venezia
- Genre: Classical music
- Length: 55:24
- Label: Winter & Winter 910 013-2
- Producer: Stefan Winter

Uri Caine chronology
Urlicht / Primal Light (1997)	Wagner e Venezia (1997)	Blue Wail (1998)

Wagner e Venezia is a live album by pianist Uri Caine's Ensemble featuring compositions by Richard Wagner recorded in Venice and released on the Winter & Winter label in 1997.

== Reception ==
Professional ratings
Review scores
Source	Rating
Allmusic	4/5 stars
All About Jazz	5/5 stars
The Penguin Guide to Jazz Recordings	3/4 stars

In his review for Allmusic, Stephen Cook said " For the most part, the music moves at a lithe pace, matching the festive sounds of the crowd with exuberant and playful performances. Maybe not the right fit for classical purists, but certainly a fine offering for the adventurous listener". Writing for All About Jazz, C. Michael Bailey said "Wagner e Venezia is one of the pinnacles among pinnacles from the pianist/composer's early output".

== Track listing ==
All compositions by Richard Wagner

1. "Liebestod" (Tristan und Isolde) - 7:59
2. "Ouvertüre" (Tannhäuser) - 10:38
3. "Ouvertüre" (Lohengrin, 3.Akt) - 3:59
4. "Prelude" (Tristan und Isolde) - 9:25
5. "Ouvertüre" (Die Meistersinger von Nürnberg) - 9:43
6. "Der Ritt der Walküren" - 4:42
7. "Ouvertüre" (Lohengrin, 1.Akt) - 8:58

== Personnel ==
- Uri Caine - piano
- Dominic Cortese - accordion
- Mark Feldman, Joyce Hammann - violin
- Erik Friedlander - cello
- Drew Gress - bass
