= Positootly! =

Studio album by John Beasley
- Released: September 8, 2009
- Studio: Bennett Studios (Englewood, New Jersey); Rising Jazz Stars Studios (Beverly Hills, California)
- Genre: Jazz
- Length: 49:00
- Label: Resonance
- Producer: George Klabin; Joe Donofrio

John Beasley chronology
| Letter to Herbie | Positootly! |

Professional ratings
Review scores
| Source | Rating |
|---|---|
| AllMusic | 4.5/5 stars |

Positootly! is an album by pianist John Beasley. The album was Beasley's second for Resonance Records, and featured an eclectic combination of styles, including jazz, soul jazz, bossa nova, and nuevo tango. In 2010, Positootly! was nominated for the Grammy Award for Best Jazz Instrumental Album, Individual or Group.

== Track listing ==
All compositions by John Beasley except as indicated

1. "Caddo Bayou" – 5:04
2. "Positootly!" – 4:32
3. "Dindi" (Antônio Carlos Jobim) – 5:30
4. "Black Thunder" – 6:41
5. "Shatita Boom Boom (Club Desire)" – 4:58
6. "Tanguedia III" (Astor Piazzolla) – 5:29
7. "Elle" – 4:53
8. "So Tired" (Bobby Timmons) – 4:45
9. "The Eight Winds" – 4:51
10. "Hope...Arkansas" – 2:32

== Personnel ==
- John Beasley – acoustic piano, Fender Rhodes, organ, synthesizers
- James Genus – acoustic bass, electric bass
- Jeff "Tain" Watts – drums
- Munyungo Jackson – percussion
- Bennie Maupin – soprano saxophone, tenor saxophone
- Brian Lynch – trumpet

== Production ==
- George Klabin – producer
- Joe Donofrio – co-producer
- Fran Gala – engineer
- Jonathan Ryan Jiskra – engineer
- Dave Kowalski – engineer
- Pierre Paul – engineer, mastering
- Anthony Polis – cover design, artwork
- Ricky Schultz – cover design, artwork
- Giovanni Rodriguez – artwork
- Julie Dermansky – photography
- Brian McNally – photography
- Dan Ouellette – liner notes
