= Secrets (Mark Feldman album) =

Studio album by Mark Feldman, Uri Caine Greg Cohen & Joey Baron
- Released: January 27, 2009
- Recorded: January 2008
- Studio: East Side Sound, NYC
- Genre: Religious Jewish music, jazz
- Length: 59:08
- Label: Tzadik TZ 8130
- Producer: Daniel Zamir & John Zorn

Mark Feldman chronology
What Exit (2006)	Secrets (2009)	To Fly to Steal (2010)

Uri Caine chronology
The Othello Syndrome (2008)	Secrets (2009)	Plastic Temptation (2009)

Secrets is an album by violinist Mark Feldman, pianist Uri Caine, bassist Greg Cohen and drummer Joey Baron performing traditional Hassidic spiritual themes which was released on the Tzadik label in 2009.

== Reception ==
Professional ratings
Review scores
Source	Rating
Allmusic	4/5 stars

In his review for Allmusic, Michael G. Nastos notes that "this is music anyone can enjoy, no matter your religious or non-secular persuasion. What is most evident is that, although these songs are revealed perhaps for the first time on a contemporary recording, it's no secret as to the absolute brilliance of these four quality modern creative improvising musicians making this music all their own. It's a very strong release, and comes with the highest of recommendations". On All About Jazz Warren Allen said "Secrets finds them interpreting a variety of niggunim, the often wordless prayer melodies sung by sects of Hasidic Jews, and they mix a jazz sensibility with slight, indefinable touches of the avant-garde to create a quartet that speaks many languages in one voice".

== Track listing ==
All compositions traditional nigunim of the Lubavitch, Satmar, Bobov and Modzitzer Hassidim

1. "Lubavitcher Nigun" – 6:27
2. "Avinu Malkenu" – 5:40
3. "Chabad Nigun" – 5:24
4. "Z'chor Dovon" – 4:11
5. "Satmar Rikud" – 7:30
6. "Bobover Nigun" – 3:25
7. "Kel Adon" – 6:32
8. "Z'chor Hashem" – 5:35
9. "Moditzer Nigun" – 4:25

== Personnel ==
- Mark Feldman – violin
- Uri Caine – piano
- Greg Cohen – bass
- Joey Baron – drums
