= Diabelli Variations (album) =

Studio album by Uri Caine
- Released: 2002
- Recorded: February 23–26, 2002; WDR, Koln, Germany
- Genres: Classical music, Jazz
- Length: 56:07
- Label: Winter & Winter 910 086
- Producers: Uri Caine & Stefan Winter

Uri Caine chronology
Rio (2001)	Diabelli Variations (2002)	Gustav Mahler: Dark Flame (2003)

Diabelli Variations is an album by Uri Caine performing Ludwig van Beethoven's Diabelli Variations with the Concerto Köln which was recorded in 2002 and released on the Winter & Winter label.

== Reception ==
Professional ratings
Review scores
Source	Rating
Allmusic	3/5 stars
The Penguin Guide to Jazz Recordings	3/4 stars

In his review for Allmusic, Alex Henderson notes that "Diabelli Variations is strictly for broad-minded listeners who have no problem with the Euro-classical and jazz worlds interacting".

On All About Jazz C. Michael Bailey said "Like his previous forays into the classical realm, Caine willingly combines classical and jazz elements, seasoning the festivities with a bit of barrelhouse boogie woogie in one place, a bit of Harlem Stride in another, and a bit of Bill Evans impressionism in yet another. The results are a very listenable bit of genius that should appeal to those with a jazz and/or classically bent alike". Writing in JazzTimes, Andrew Lindemann Malone observed "Caine's interpretation never feels like something new so much as self-indulgent, extravagant riffing on this great work. True, Caine can make his riffing very interesting indeed, but it's hard to imagine that most music fans won't find a good recording of the original (William Kinderman on Hyperion, say) far more memorable than this enjoyable but inessential record".

== Track listing ==
All compositions adapted by Uri Caine after Ludwig van Beethoven

1. "Theme" - 1:00
2. "Variation I" - 2:13
3. "Variation II" - 0:56
4. "Variation III" - 1:15
5. "Variation IV" - 1:14
6. "Variation V" - 1:04
7. "Variation VI" - 0:59
8. "Variation VII" - 1:49
9. "Variation VIII" - 1:22
10. "Variation IX" - 1:29
11. "Variation X" - 0:38
12. "Variation XI" - 0:59
13. "Variation XII" - 0:54
14. "Variation XIII" - 1:00
15. "Variation XIV" - 2:53
16. "Variation XV" - 0:31
17. "Variation XVI" - 1:17
18. "Variation XVII" - 1:44
19. "Variation XVIII" - 1:27
20. "Variation XIX" - 1:05
21. "Variation XX" - 2:28
22. "Variation XXI" - 1:09
23. "Variation XXII" - 0:50
24. "Variation XXIII" - 1:06
25. "Variation XXIV" - 1:14
26. "Variation XXV" - 3:23
27. "Variation XXVI" - 1:00
28. "Variation XXVII" - 1:35
29. "Variation XXVIII" - 0:50
30. "Variation XIX" - 1:14
31. "Variation XXX" - 1:58
32. "Variation XXXI" - 5:03
33. "Variation XXXII" - 5:50
34. "Variation XXXIII" - 2:22

== Personnel ==
- Uri Caine - fortepiano

Concerto Köln:

- Werner Ehrhardt, Jörg Buschhaus, Stephan Sänger, Markus Hoffmann, Frauke Pöhl, Martin Ehrhardt - first violin
- Hedwig van der Linde, Antje Engel, Corinna Hildebrand, Gudrun Engel-hardt, Kathrin Tröger, Chiharu Abe - second violin
- Antje Sabinski, Giovanni Zordan, Lothar Haass, Stefan Schmidt - viola
- Werner Matzke, Jan Kunkel, Susanne Wahmhoff - violon cello
- Johannes Esser, Miriam Wittulski - double bass
- Cordula Breuer - flute
- Pier Luigi Fabretti - oboe
- Diego Montes - clarinet
- Lorenzo Alpert - bassoon
- Dileno Baldin - horn
- Hannes Kothe - trumpet
- Stefan Gawlick - timpani
