= Gustav Mahler: Dark Flame =

Album by Uri Caine

Studio album by Uri Caine
- Released: 2003
- Recorded: July 1999 to May 2003; Marstall, Munich, Germany
- Genre: Jazz
- Length: 76:54
- Label: Winter & Winter 910 095
- Producer: Stefan Winter

Uri Caine chronology
Diabelli Variations (2002)	Gustav Mahler: Dark Flame (2003)	Live at the Village Vanguard (2004)

Gustav Mahler: Dark Flame is an album by Uri Caine featuring interpretations of music by Gustav Mahler which was released on the Winter & Winter label in 2003.

== Reception ==
Professional ratings
Review scores
Source	Rating
Allmusic	4/5 stars
The Penguin Guide to Jazz Recordings	4/4 stars

In his review for Allmusic, Alex Henderson notes that "Caine celebrates Mahler on his own terms on this consistently intriguing CD".

Writing in JazzTimes, Andrew Lindemann Malone observed "When Caine responds to the melodies, rhythms and texts of Mahler's originals, he doesn't merely change his own rhythms and melodies, as jazzmen have since time immemorial, but changes styles completely-and since Mahler embraced an eclectic style himself, Caine can really pull out anything he can think of".

== Track listing ==
All compositions by Uri Caine after Gustav Mahler

1. "Dark Flame" - 11:03
2. "Only Love Beauty" - 2:57
3. "In Praise of Lofty Judgement" - 3:08
4. "Two Blue Eyes" - 9:51
5. "Shining Trumpets" - 7:53
6. "The Lonely One in Autumn" - 4:51
7. "Song of the Prisoner in the Tower" - 8:06
8. "When My Sweetheart..." - 8:39
9. "Labor Lost" - 3:18
10. "On Youth" - 3:34
11. "Rhinelegend" - 3:20
12. "When Your Mother Comes in the Door" - 1:14
13. "St. Anthony of Padua Preaches to the Fishes" - 6:16
14. "Only Love Beauty" - 2:44

== Personnel ==
- Uri Caine - piano (tracks 1, 3–5, 7–9, 11–14)
- Ralph Alessi - trumpet (tracks 1, 3–5, 7–9, 11, 13 & 14)
- Don Byron - clarinet (tracks 1, 3–5, 7–9, 11, 13 & 14)
- Tao Chen - dizi (tracks 6 & 10)
- Yi Zhou - pipa (track 10)
- Mark Feldman - violin (tracks 1, 3–5, 7–9, 11, 13 & 14)
- David Gilmore - guitar (track 7)
- Bao-Li Zhang - erhu (track 10)
- Sisi Chen - yang quin (tracks 6 & 10)
- DJ Olive - turntables, electronics (tracks 1, 3–5, 7 & 8)
- Michael Formanek - bass (tracks 1, 3–5, 8, 9, 11, 13 & 14)
- Jim Black - drums
- Kettwiger Bach Chor conducted by Wolfgang Kläsener
- Aaron Bensoussan (tracks 4 & 8), Sadiq Bey (track 9), Shulamith Wechter Caine (track 4), Tong Qiang Chen (track 6), Julie Patton (tracks 1 & 7) - voice
- Sepp Bierbichler (tracks 3, 7, 11 & 12), Barbara Walker (track 2) - vocals
