= Live at the Village Vanguard (Uri Caine Trio album) =

Live album by Uri Caine Trio
- Released: Jun 8, 2004
- Recorded: May 23–25, 2003
- Venue: The Village Vanguard (New York, New York)
- Genre: Jazz
- Label: Winter & Winter
- Producer: Stefan Winter

Uri Caine chronology
| Gustav Mahler: Dark Flame (2003) | Live at the Village Vanguard (2004) | Shelf Life (2005) |

Professional ratings
Review scores
| Source | Rating |
|---|---|
| AllMusic | 4/5 stars |
| All About Jazz | (favorable) |
| JazzTimes | (favorable) |
| Tom Hull | B+ |
| The Penguin Guide to Jazz Recordings | 3.5/4 stars |

Live at the Village Vanguard is a 2004 album by jazz pianist Uri Caine as Uri Caine Trio.

== Track listing ==
1. "Nefertiti" (Wayne Shorter) – 9:03
2. "All the Way" (Jimmy Van Heusen) – 5:21
3. "Stiletto" – 7:38
4. "I Thought About You" (Jimmy Van Heusen) – 8:44
5. "Otello" – 6:33
6. "Snaggletooth" – 7:43
7. "Go Deep" – 9:33
8. "Cheek to Cheek" – 9:10
9. "Most Wanted" – 6:34
10. "BushWhack" – 6:20

== Personnel ==
- Uri Caine – piano
- Drew Gress – bass
- Ben Perowsky – drums
