= The Sidewalks of New York: Tin Pan Alley =

Studio album by Uri Caine Ensemble
- Released: August 10, 1999
- Recorded: February 4–10, 1999; Gramercy Park Hotel, Avatar Studios, Central Park and various other locations in New York City
- Genre: Jazz, popular music
- Length: 77:16
- Label: Winter & Winter 910 038-2
- Producer: Stefan Winter

Uri Caine chronology
Blue Wail (1997)	The Sidewalks of New York: Tin Pan Alley (1999)	Gustav Mahler in Toblach (1999)

The Sidewalks of New York: Tin Pan Alley is an album by pianist Uri Caine. It was released through Winter & Winter Records, on August 10, 1999.

== Reception ==
Professional ratings
Review scores
Source	Rating
Allmusic	3/5 stars
All About Jazz	5/5 stars
Tom Hull	A−
The Penguin Guide to Jazz Recordings	3/4 stars

In his review for AllMusic, Ken Dryden notes that "Pianist Uri Caine's work is always intriguing, but this CD is something very different. Sidewalks of New York comes off like the soundtrack to an as−yet unmade documentary about Tin Pan Alley at the turn of the century, complete with sound effects of horses and people on the street, folks celebrating in a rowdy saloon, and so on". On All About Jazz, C. Michael Bailey said "The Sidewalks of New York is an impressionistic documentary of late 19th and early 20th century popular music. Not music of the 1920s, the music of the pre−1920s. Each piece flows into the next, often with the background of street and bar noises, all providing an ambiance of a bustling city's life".

== Track listing ==
1. "Overture: The Sidewalks of New York/I Wonder Who's Kissing Her Now" (James W. Blake, Charles B. Lawlor/Joseph E. Howard, Harold Orlob, Will M. Hough, Frank R. Adams) – 2:27
2. "Too Much Mustard" (Cecil Macklin) – 2:40
3. 'Has Anybody Here Seen Kelly?" (Clarence Wainwright Murphy, Will Letters) – 2:32
4. "Life's a Very Funny Proposition After All" (George M. Cohan) – 4:04
5. "Sidewalk Story: Daisy Bell/My Wild Irish Rose" (Harry Dacre/Chauncey Olcott) – 3:51
6. "Charleston Rag" (Eubie Blake) – 2:08
7. "Take Me Out to the Ball Game" (Jack Norworth, Albert Von Tilzer) – 1:49
8. "Everybody's Doin' It" (Irving Berlin) – 1:32
9. "How'd You Like to Spoon with Me?" (Jerome Kern, Edward Laska) – 1:44
10. "Cohen Owes Me Ninety Seven Dollars" (Berlin) – 3:37
11. "By the Light of the Silvery Moon" (Gus Edwards, Edward Madden) – 3:20
12. "Nobody" (Bert Williams, Alex Rogers) – 4:11
13. "Waiting for the Robert E. Lee" (L. Wolfe Gilbert, Lewis F. Muir) – 1:18
14. "Interlude: The Sidewalks of New York" (Blake, Lawlor) – 3:46
15. "By the Beautiful Sea" (Harry Carroll, Harold R. Atteridge) – 1:48
16. "In the Good Old Summertime" (George Evans, Ren Shields) – 1:16
17. Some of These Days: The Rehearsal" (Shelton Brooks) – 6:46
18. "Some of These Days: The Show" (Brooks) – 4:03
19. "Castle Walk" (F. W. Meacham, Ford Dabney) – 2:49
20. "They Didn't Believe Me" (Kern, Herbert Reynolds) – 3:41
21. "The Memphis Blues" (W. C. Handy, George Norton) – 1:56
22. "After the Ball" (Charles K. Harris) – 3:28
23. "You're a Grand Old Flag" (Cohan) – 1:23
24. "The Bowery" – 4:03
25. "When I Leave the World Behind" (Berlin) – 2:34
26. "Finale: The Sidewalks of New York" (Blake, Lawlor) – 3:29
27. "Coda: In the Good Old Summertime" (Evans, Shields) – 1:01

== Personnel ==
- Uri Caine – piano, vocals
- Bob DeBellis – flute
- Ralph Alessi (tracks 2, 5, 11, 14, 18 & 23), Dave Douglas (tracks 4, 12 & 22) – trumpet
- Josh Roseman – trombone
- Bob Stewart – tuba
- Don Byron – clarinet
- Dominic Cortese – accordion, vocals
- Mark Feldman – violin
- Eddy Davis – banjo
- James Genus – bass
- Ben Perowsky – drums
- Barbara Walker (tracks: 17, 18), Brian D’Arcy Jones (tracks: 5), Fay Galperin (tracks: 14), Nancy Anderson (tracks: 20, 22, 24), Nancy Opel (tracks: 3, 8, 11), Philip Hernandez (tracks: 26), Renae Morway-Baker (tracks: 25), Sadiq Bey (tracks: 12, 24), Saul Galperin (tracks: 7, 14), The Sidewalks Of New York Choir, Stuart Zagnit (tracks: 4, 10), Susan Haefner (tracks: 9) – vocals
