= Sphere Music =

Studio album by Uri Caine
- Released: 1993
- Recorded: April and May 1992
- Studio: Clinton Studios, New York City
- Genre: Jazz
- Length: 65:18
- Label: JMT 514 007
- Producer: Stefan Winter

Uri Caine chronology
Sphere Music (1993)	Toys (1996)

Sphere Music is the debut album by pianist Uri Caine featuring two compositions by Thelonious Monk which was first released on the JMT label in 1993.

== Reception ==
Professional ratings
Review scores
Source	Rating
Allmusic	3/5 stars
Tom Hull	B+
The Penguin Guide to Jazz Recordings	3.5/4 stars

In her review for Allmusic, Heather Phares said "An eclectic tour through different musical moods and styles, Sphere Music is an engaging, promising first work".

== Track listing ==
All compositions by Uri Caine except as indicated

1. "Mr. B.C." - 8:55
2. "This Is a Thing Called Love" - 7:12
3. "When the Word Is Given" - 5:20
4. "'Round Midnight" (Thelonious Monk) - 4:17
5. "Let Me Count the Ways" - 6:34
6. "Jelly" - 7:18
7. "Just in Time" (Adolph Green, Betty Comden, Jule Styne) - 7:50
8. "We See" (Monk) - 8:02
9. "Jan Fan" - 10:08

== Personnel ==
- Uri Caine - piano
- Graham Haynes - cornet (tracks 3 & 9)
- Don Byron - clarinet (tracks 1, 4 & 6)
- Gary Thomas - tenor saxophone (tracks 3, 7 & 9)
- Anthony Cox (tracks 3, 5 & 7–9), Kenny Davis (tracks 1, 2 & 6) - bass
- Ralph Peterson, Jr., - drums
