= Rio (Uri Caine album) =

Studio album by Uri Caine
- Released: 2001
- Recorded: June 8–13, 2001; Various locations in Rio de Janeiro, Brazil
- Genre: Jazz
- Length: 69:06
- Label: Winter & Winter 910 079
- Producers: Uri Caine & Stefan Winter

Uri Caine chronology
Solitaire (2001)	Rio (2001)	Diabelli Variations (2002)

Rio is an album by Uri Caine which was recorded and released on the Winter & Winter label in 2001. The album explores Brazilian music, and features of large ensemble of Brazilian musicians with an emphasis on percussion.

== Reception ==
Professional ratings
Review scores
Source	Rating
Allmusic	3/5 stars
Tom Hull	B
The Penguin Guide to Jazz Recordings	3/4 stars

In his review for Allmusic, Glenn Astarita notes that "With this effort, Caine seemingly derives inspiration from the rhythmic structures while melding his thematic inventions into the percussionists' temporal planes. Nonetheless, the artist captures and illustrates the less commercial side of what might be considered indigenous Brazilian music".

On All About Jazz C. Michael Bailey said "The Brazilian music presented here is not the plush Bossa one would expect. It is more of an abstract look at the indigenous popular music, that music that might have less appeal in the United States if entrusted in lesser hands that Caines. The excellent results are a collections of Brazilian vignettes, little Latin confections finely crafted to be had and eaten too. Caine surrounds himself with Brazilian musicians, most particularly percussionists who weave their special magic throughout the music. It is as if we are privy to a Rio radio dial, spinning form one station to the next and listening every once and awhile". Writing in JazzTimes, Bill Shoemaker observed, "Playing both piano and Fender Rhodes, Caine is joined by a revolving cast of musicians, singers and drum choruses who consistently coax rhythmically vibrant performances from him. At slower tempi, Caine caresses the lyrical soul of Brazilian music with obvious affection. Rio is a virtual hour in the sun".

== Track listing ==
All compositions by Uri Caine except as indicated

1. "Samba do Mar" (Uri Caine e Unidos da Vila Isabel) - 4:35
2. "Dia de Praia" - 4:49
3. "Teu Chamego" - 5:42
4. "Revolucionário" (Paulo Braga) - 3:55
5. "Bondinho de Santa Tereza" (Traditional) - 3:16
6. "Combatente" (Maurício Pacheco, Pedro D-Lita) - 4:07
7. "Samba do Fogo" (Uri Caine e Unidos da Vila Isabel) - 3:12 Rdio
8. "Raquel" - 5:31
9. "Arpoador" - 5:05 Rdio
10. "Assalto Cultural" (Uri Caine / Odélio Antônio Jr., Paulo Henrique Deptuesou, Antônio Carlos L. Roca) - 3:40
11. "Na Lapa" (Ricardo Curtz, Ericson Pires, Claudio Monjope, Tiago Didac, Uri Caine) - 3:09
12. "Samba da Terra" (Uri Caine e Unidos da Vila Isabel) - 3:31 Rdio
13. "Um Minuto Só" (Jairzinho Oliveira) - 4:02
14. "Choro Maluco" (Paulo Braga) - 5:05
15. "Samba da Rua" (Traditional) - 1:39
16. "Akalanguiado" (Paulo Braga) - 3:32
17. "Adeus" - 1:30
18. "Samba do Vento" (Uri Caine e Unidos da Vila Isabel) - 2:38

== Personnel ==
- Uri Caine - piano, teclado Fender Rhodes
- Paulo Braga - bateria, percussão
- Jorge Helder - baixo
- Lula Galvão - violão
- Jair Oliveira - violão, voz
- Kacau Gomes, Cris Delanno - voz
- Humberto Cazes - percussão, pandeiro, reco - reco de mola, tamborim, triangulo
- Unidos da Vila Isabel
- Grupo Corpo Movimento Capoeira
- Morro do Cantagalo
- Stereo Maracanã
- Assalto Cultural
- Hapax
- Arcos da Lapa
- Músicos do Morro dos Prazeres
