= Things (album) =

Studio album by Uri Caine, Paolo Fresu
- Released: July 8, 2006
- Recorded: May 18–19, 2005
- Studio: Artesuono Recording Studio
- Genre: Jazz
- Length: 1:06:08
- Label: Blue Note 0946-369284-2-5
- Producer: Vittorio Albani

Uri Caine chronology
Shelf-Life (2005)	Things (2006)	Uri Caine Ensemble Plays Mozart (2006)

Professional ratings
Review scores
Source	Rating
Debaser	4/5 stars

Things is a studio album by American pianist Uri Caine and Italian trumpeter Paolo Fresu which was released on the Blue Note label in 2006.

== Track listing ==
No.	Title	Length
1.	"Dear Old Stockholm"	5:19
2.	"Everything Happens To Me"	7:02
3.	"Frammento Del Temperamento Discutibile"	0:17
4.	"Fishermen, Strawberries and Devil Crab"	5:10
5.	"Frammento Impavido"	0:44
6.	"Cheek to Cheek"	7:17
7.	"Si Dolce È Il Tormento"	5:26
8.	"Frammento Di Re Fosco"	0:51
9.	"I Loves You Porgy"	5:21
10.	"Cheney's Dick"	4:38
11.	"Frammento Del Coraggioso"	1:19
12.	"Sonia Said"	3:44
13.	"Fellini"	6:48
14.	"Solar"	4:33
15.	"Frammento Con Lapilli"	1:05
16.	"Varca Lucente"	3:21
17.	"Frammento Aviario"	0:57
18.	"E Se Domani"	2:16
Total length:		01:06:08

== Personnel ==
- Uri Caine – piano, electric piano
- Paolo Fresu – trumpet, flugelhorn, effects
