= The Othello Syndrome =

Studio album by Uri Caine Ensemble
- Released: October 26, 2008
- Recorded: February 2005 to March 2008
- Genres: Contemporary classical music, Jazz
- Length: 75:23
- Label: Winter & Winter 910 135–2
- Producer: Stefan Winter

Uri Caine chronology
| Pure Affection (2007) | The Othello Syndrome (2008) | Secrets (2009) |

The Othello Syndrome is an album by pianist Uri Caine featuring compositions based on excerpts from Giuseppe Verdi's opera Otello which was released on the Winter & Winter label in 2008.

== Reception ==
Professional ratings
Review scores
| Source | Rating |
|---|---|
| Allmusic | 4/5 stars |
| PopMatters | 9/10 stars |

In his review for Allmusic, Ken Dryden notes that "Opera fans without a sense of humor will scoff at this recording, but Caine shows a love of the music, even in his madcap charts". PopMatters correspondent Will Layman said "The Othello Syndrome, Caine's zany take on Verdi's 1887 opera, is Caine's most consistently focused classical project and, plainly, one of the very best". On the website All About Jazz, C. Michael Bailey wrote, "The Othello Syndrome is Uri Caine at his mad scientist best: conjuring music from a million different places and making it sound like it was with you at home all the time". JazzTimes reviewer, Perry Tannenbaum, observed "The Othello Syndrome is obviously a meticulously crafted piece. While its daring and eclecticism will no doubt spark lively controversy, its heart points up the beauty of Verdi's score".

== Track listing ==
All compositions by Uri Caine after Giuseppe Verdi

1. "Othello's Victory" – 3:39
2. "Fire Song" – 4:56
3. "Drinking Song" – 4:25
4. "Love Duet with Othello and Desdemona" – 8:28
5. "Introduction to Act II" – 2:49
6. "Jago's Credo" – 4:42
7. "She's the Only One I Love" – 6:02
8. "Jago's Web" – 3:55
9. "Desdemona's Lament" – 4:44
10. "Am I a Fool?" – 5:18
11. "The Lion of Venice" – 3:53
12. "Othello's Confession" – 3:25
13. "The Willow Song / Ave Maria" – 7:41
14. "Murder" – 4:17
15. "The Death of Othello" – 5:05

== Personnel ==
- Uri Caine – piano, keyboards
- Ralph Alessi – trumpet
- Achille Succi, Chris Speed – clarinet
- Joyce Hammann – violin
- Nguyên Lê – guitar
- Tim Lefebvre – bass, electric bass
- John Hebert bass
- Jim Black, Zach Danziger – drums
- Bruno Fabrizio Sorba, Stefano Bassanese – electronics
- Bunny Sigler (tracks 1, 4, 7, 10 & 15), Dhafer Youssef (tracks 1 & 14), Josefine Lindstrand (tracks 4, 9 & 13) – vocals
- Julie Patton (tracks 4 & 14), Marco Paolini (tracks 6 & 8), Sadiq Bey (tracks 6, 12 & 14) – voice
