= Plastic Temptation =

Studio album by Uri Caine
- Released: 2009
- Recorded: March 2009
- Studio: Excello Recording, NYC
- Genre: Jazz
- Length: 61:05
- Label: Winter & Winter 910 161-2
- Producer: Stefan Winter

Uri Caine chronology
Secrets (2009)	Plastic Temptation (2009)	Twelve Caprices (2010)

Plastic Temptation is an album by Uri Caine's Bedrock with Tim Lefebvre and Zach Danziger which was released on the Winter & Winter label in 2009.

== Reception ==
Professional ratings
Review scores
Source	Rating
Allmusic	4/5 stars
Tom Hull	B

In his review for Allmusic, Alex Henderson notes that "as eclectic and far-reaching as Plastic Temptation is, Caine and his associates never sound confused or unfocused. In fact, the 61-minute CD is admirably cohesive. Plastic Temptation will come as a surprise to those who associate Caine with jazz-minded interpretations of Beethoven, Mozart, and Bach, but it's an exciting journey if one is open to hearing a totally different side of the risk-taking musician".

== Track listing ==
All compositions by Uri Caine, Tim Lefebvre & Zach Danziger except as indicated

1. "Overture" – 1:51
2. "Prelude for Sheldon" – 2:41
3. "Noid" – 4:34
4. "Roll With It" (Caine, Danziger, Lefebvre, Barbara Walker) – 4:46
5. "Duke Countdown" (Caine, Danziger) – 0:29
6. "Count Duke" – 3:52
7. "Riled Up" – 4:23
8. "Till You Come Back To Me" (Caine, Danziger, Lefebvre, Walker) – 5:53
9. "Plastic Temptation" – 4:39
10. "Seven Year Glitch" (Caine, Danziger) – 1:58
11. "Work It Out" (Caine, Danziger, Lefebvre, Walker, Andrew (Benjamin) Sterling Cannon) – 4:29
12. "Mayor Goldie" (Caine, Danziger) – 6:00
13. "Victrola" (Caine, Danziger) – 2:14
14. "Lemonana Vasconcelos" (Caine, Danziger, Lefebvre, Walker) – 4:27
15. "Ink Bladder" (Caine, Danziger) – 2:22
16. "Lunchmeat Concerto in Eb Minor" (Caine, Danziger) – 1:18
17. "Garcia" – 2:11
18. "Organ Thunder" – 2:55

== Personnel ==
- Uri Caine – keyboards
- Tim Lefebvre – bass, guitar
- Zach Danziger – drums
- Elizabeth Pupo-Walker – percussion
- Barbara Walker – vocals

== Technical credits ==
- Nathan Rosborough – Audio engineer
- Hugh Pool – Audio engineer
- Excello Recording, Brooklyn, NY – Recording studio
