= Moving Portrait =

Studio album by Dave Douglas
- Released: 1998
- Recorded: December 29 & 30, 1997
- Studio: Avatar, New York City
- Genre: Jazz
- Length: 64:36
- Label: DIW Records; DIW 934
- Producer: Dave Douglas & Kazunori Sugiyama

Dave Douglas chronology
Stargazer (1997)	Moving Portrait (1998)	Charms of the Night Sky (1998)

Professional ratings
Review scores
Source	Rating
AllMusic	3/5 stars
The Penguin Guide to Jazz Recordings	3.5/4 stars

Moving Portrait is the ninth album by the trumpeter Dave Douglas. It was released on the Japanese DIW label in 1997 and contains performances by Douglas, Bill Carrothers, James Genus and Billy Hart. It includes Douglas' interpretations of three compositions by Joni Mitchell.

== Reception ==
On All About Jazz, Jim Santella stated: "Like all forms of art, the result is a session that includes drama, variety, and a story that attaches different meanings to each viewer or listener. Douglas' music evolves from the hard bop idiom, with special care given to the presentation of his unique ideas. The trumpeter uses a soft attack, round tone, fluid articulation, and unlimited imagination to honor beauty in various forms. ...Recommended".

== Track listing ==
All compositions by Dave Douglas except as indicated

1. "The Nine Cloud Dream" – 5:17
2. "Paradox" – 7:27
3. "Moving Portrait" – 10:05
4. "First Frost" – 6:30
5. "Roses Blue" (Mitchell) – 2:52
6. "My Old Man" (Mitchell) – 7:40
7. "The Same Situation" (Mitchell) – 6:00
8. "Movement" – 8:09
9. "Romero" – 10:36
- Recorded at Avatar, New York City on December 29 and 30, 1997

== Personnel ==
- Dave Douglas: trumpet
- Bill Carrothers: piano
- James Genus: bass
- Billy Hart: drums
