= Urlicht / Primal Light =

Studio album by Uri Caine
- Released: 1997
- Recorded: June 11–26, 1996
- Studios: Systems Two Recording Studio, Brooklyn
- Genres: Classical music, jazz
- Length: 72:42
- Label: Winter & Winter 910 004-2
- Producer: Stefan Winter

Uri Caine chronology
Toys (1996)	Urlicht / Primal Light (1997)	Wagner e Venezia (1997)

Urlicht / Primal Light is an album by pianist Uri Caine featuring compositions by Gustav Mahler recorded in 1996 and released on the Winter & Winter label in 1997.

== Reception ==
Professional ratings
Review scores
Source	Rating
Allmusic	4/5 stars
The Penguin Guide to Jazz Recordings	3.5/4 stars

In his review for Allmusic, Steve Loewy said "Very few, if any, attempts to merge classical music and jazz have succeeded. Somehow, jazz pianist Uri Caine's masterful and magnificent interpretations of selected works of the 19th century classical composer Gustav Mahler work remarkably well... He does not simply "jazz up" Mahler, which would mock the greatness of his works. Instead, he worms himself inside the songs and harmonies and uses them as a starting point to create a related, but new, synthesis of his music. Jewish folk melodies, cantorial renditions, free jazz, and classical violin are all merged in a whole that transcends the parts". Gramophone said "What Caine has done is much more radical and controversial than anything in, say, Jacques Loussier’s Bach. Each shard is given a bizarre new slant, which means relocating it to a Broadway show, a dinner-dance in the Catskills, a jazz concert or a rock venue".

== Track listing ==
All compositions by Gustav Mahler

1. "Symphony No. 5, Funeral March" – 5:52
2. "The Drummer Boy" – 5:45
3. "Now Will the Sun Rise as Brightly" – 1:50
4. "I Often Think They Have Merely Gone Out!" – 3:33
5. "Symphony No. 1 Titan" – 12:02
6. "Primal Light" – 2:31
7. "I Went Out This Morning Over the Countryside/Resurrection" – 6:54
8. "Symphony No. 5, Adagietto" – 10:35
9. "The Drunkard in Spring" – 7:50
10. "Who Thought Up This Song?" – 2:36
11. "The Farewell" – 12:59

== Personnel ==
- Uri Caine – piano
- Dave Douglas – trumpet
- Josh Roseman – trombone
- Dave Binney – soprano saxophone
- Don Byron – clarinet
- Mark Feldman – violin
- Larry Gold – cello
- Danny Blume – guitar, electronics
- DJ Olive – turntables
- Michael Formanek – bass
- Joey Baron – drums
- Aaron Bensoussan – hand drum, cantor
- Arto Lindsay, Dean Bowman – vocals
