= DJ Olive =

American DJ

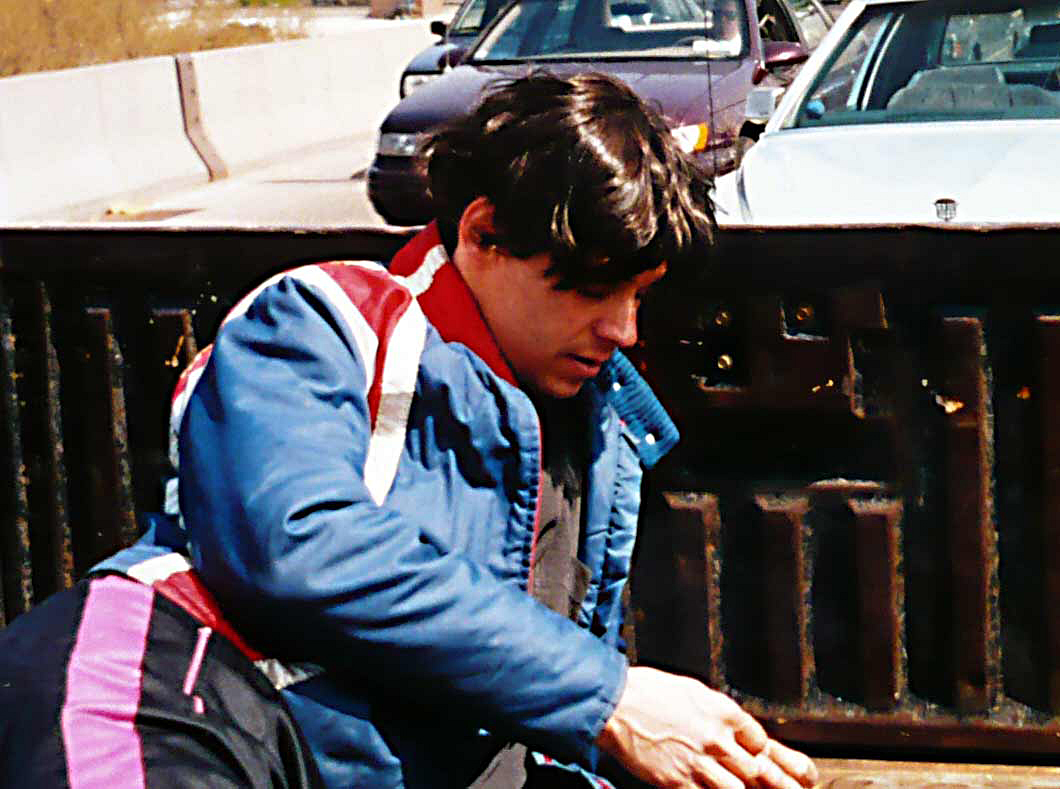
- Asch in 1992

Background information
- Also known as: The Audio Janitor
- Born: Gregor Asch; Williamsburg, Brooklyn, New York City, New York
- Genres: Hip hop, instrumental hip hop, turntablism, ambient, illbient, electronic, acid jazz, nu-jazz, jazz, free improvisation, experimental, avant-garde
- Occupations: Disc jockey, producer, turntablist, artist
- Instruments: Turntables, analog synthesizers, programming
- Years active: Early 1990s (with We), 1991-present (as DJ Olive)
- Labels: Asphodel Records, The Agriculture, Room40, Sub Rosa, SYR Records

Gregor Asch' (born ca. 1961), better known by the stage names DJ Olive and The Audio Janitor; is an American disc jockey and turntablist.

He is known for producing music generally in the electronic genre, with strong influences of dub, and free improvisation styles. He is widely credited with coining of the term "Illbient" in 1994. He was a founding member of the immersionist group Lalalandia Entertainment Research Corporation in 1991.

DJ Olive is a member of We, Lunchbox and Liminal. He has also collaborated with Kim Gordon, Ikue Mori, William Hooker, Zeena Parkins, Uri Caine, Medeski Martin and Wood, Dave Douglas, and various others.

== Discography ==
- dj olive. Coco, Record blanks
- dj olive. So Me Free, Record blanks
- dj olive. Homeless Records, Record blanks
- dj olive. Moon Wax, Record blanks
- dj olive. Vinyl Scores Live at Kootenay Coop Radio, Record blanks
- dj olive. Vinyl Scores Live at Berghain, Record blanks
- dj olive. Balm, Record blanks
- dj olive, THWIS, the Agriculture
- dj olive, "Heaps As" Live in Tasmania, the Agriculture
- dj olive, Bodega, the Agriculture
- dj olive, Coonymus ep, the Agriculture
- dj olive, Triage, ROOM40
- dj olive, Sleep, ROOM40
- dj olive, Buoy, ROOM40
- We™, Decentertainment, Home Entertainment,
- We™, Square root of negative one, Asphodel
- We™, "as is", Asphodel
- We™, Asphodelic, Asphodel
- We™, Sonar99. La recopilacion, so dens
- We™, crooklyn dub vol 1, Word sound
- We™, Valis: assassination of syntax, subharmonic
- We™, Mysteries of creation, Axiom
- We™, Necropolis Mix, Knitting Factory Works
- We™, The Antenna Tool and Die Session, Asphodel
- We™, Home Entertainment Vol. 2, Liquid Sky Music
- We™, Home Entertainment Vol. 3, Liquid Sky Music
- We™, Rock& Roll, this is jungle sky vol. 5, Liquid Sky Music
- We™, Land of the Baboon, Silent
- We™, You Mix, Incursions in Illbient, Asphodel
- Lunchbox, Anyways, the Agriculture
- Lunchbox, Incite:20, XLR8R
- Kim Gordon, Dj Olive, Ikue Mori, SYR 5
- DJ Olive & J.P. Dessy, Scories, Sub Rosa
- BBQ Beets II, returturn of the yams, the Agriculture.com
- Barbecue Beets, sunrise on a rooftop in brooklyn, the agriculture
- Liminal, Live at the Whitney Museum Series, Knitting Factory Works
- Liminal, Nosferatu Soundtrack, Knitting Factory Works
- Liminal, Pre Set, Knitting Factory Works
- Keter, Zohar, Knitting Factory Works
- Elliott Sharp, State of the Union, Zoar
- Funk, this is jungle sky vol.6. Liquid Sky Music
- Welcome to Execrate, Leaf
- Ben Neill, Triptycal, Antilles
- William Hooker, Armageddon, Homestead Records
- William Hooker, Mindfulness, Knitting Factory Works
- William Hooker, Compexity #2, Kos recordings
- Cloudwatch vol. 2. Sonic Soul
- Gerard Malanga, Up from the Archives, Sub Rosa
- BitStreams, Sound work exhibition at the Whitney Museum, JDK
- A Mutated Christmas, Illegal Art
- Copier.Coller, Quatermass, La Batie, Sub Rosa
- The turntable sessions, vol 1, Amulet Records
- Drop the Needle, illy B Eats remixes and breakbeats, Amulet Records
- Melatonin, Room 40
- Dj Olive meets I/O, Powerhouse Sessions, Room 40
- Polyhedric Tetrapak, Ooze.bap records
- NXS, Sleeper, Music Mine
- Soundworks, Whitney Biennial 2002, Whitney
- Blue Marble, Aiko Shimada, Tzadik
- EMIT, One, Electronic music information technology
- City Sonics, Transcultures
- Christian Marclay, dj Trio, Asphodel
- Christian Marclay, dj Trio, Live at the Hirshhorn 2002, Cuneiform Records
- Liquid Architecture #6, Liquid Architecture Festival Melbourne
- Matt Haimovitz, Goulash, Oxingale records
- Matt Haimovitz Tod Machover, The Vinyl Cello, Oxingale records
- Benefit Compilation For Japan, Various Artists Of Kompakt Distribution
- 2008 Mutek Festival Compilation, Mutek Records
- Air Texture Vol 3, Air Texture

With Uri Caine

- Urlicht / Primal Light (Winter & Winter, 1997)
- Gustav Mahler in Toblach (Winter & Winter, 1999)
- The Goldberg Variations (Winter & Winter, 2000)
- Gustav Mahler: Dark Flame (Winter & Winter, 2003)
- Shelf-Life (Winter & Winter, 2005)
- Uri Caine Ensemble Plays Mozart (Winter & Winter, 2006)

With Dave Douglas

- Keystone (Greenleaf, 2005)
- Moonshine (Greenleaf, 2007)
- Spark of Being (Greenleaf, 2010)

With Medeski, Martin & Wood

- Uninvisible (Blue Note, 2002)
