= Stargazer (Dave Douglas album) =

Live album by Dave Douglas
- Released: 1997
- Recorded: December 30, 1996
- Genre: Jazz, free jazz
- Length: 60:01
- Label: Arabesque
- Producer: Dave Douglas

Dave Douglas chronology
Sanctuary (1997)	Stargazer (1997)	Moving Portrait (1998)

Professional ratings
Review scores
Source	Rating
Allmusic	4/5 stars
The Penguin Guide to Jazz Recordings	3/4 stars

Stargazer is the eighth album by jazz trumpeter Dave Douglas. It was released in 1997 on Arabesque Records. The album features performances by Douglas, Chris Speed, Josh Roseman, Uri Caine, James Genus and Joey Baron, and includes Douglas' interpretations of three compositions by Wayne Shorter.

== Reception ==
The Allmusic review by David R. Adler states "Douglas's writing and playing are highly unpredictable and emotionally rich. His remarkable sextet delivers every note with conviction and finesse". On All About Jazz Glenn Astarita said "With Stargazer, Dave Douglas has quickly established himself as one of the premier trumpet masters of the 90's... This release ranks among Douglas' most inspired work — fine craftsman with amazing chops yet an extremely versatile and musician. The future of jazz seems bright with the advent of Dave Douglas' vision. Highly recommended".

== Track listing ==
All compositions by Dave Douglas except as indicated

1. "Spring Ahead" - 4:24
2. "Goldfish" - 10:28
3. "Stargazer" - 6:39
4. "Four Sleepers" - 10:23
5. "On The Milky Way Express" (Shorter) - 4:12
6. "Pug Nose" (Shorter) - 4:41
7. "Dark Sky" - 5:53
8. "Intuitive Science" - 8:49
9. "Diana" (Shorter) - 4:32
- Recorded on December 30, 1996

== Personnel ==
- Dave Douglas: trumpet
- Chris Speed: tenor saxophone, clarinet
- Joshua Roseman: trombone
- Uri Caine: piano
- James Genus: bass
- Joey Baron: drums
