= Toys (Uri Caine album) =

Studio album by Uri Caine
- Released: 1996
- Recorded: February & March 1995
- Studio: Power Station, New York City
- Genre: Jazz
- Length: 68:58
- Label: JMT JMT 514 022-2
- Producer: Stefan Winter

Uri Caine chronology
Sphere Music (1995)	Toys (1996)	Urlicht / Primal Light (1997)

Toys is the second album by pianist Uri Caine featuring four compositions by Herbie Hancock which was first released on the JMT label in 1995.

== Reception ==
Professional ratings
Review scores
Source	Rating
Allmusic	3/5 stars
All About Jazz	3.5/5 stars
Tom Hull	A−
The Penguin Guide to Jazz Recordings	4/4 stars

In her review for Allmusic, Heather Phares said "Toys continues Uri Caine's integration of disparate styles into jazz... his technical brilliance and mercurial style shine". Writing for All About Jazz, Robert R. Calder said "neither the most spontaneous nor always the most profound. Technical accomplishment it does have in spades, however".

== Track listing ==
All compositions by Uri Caine except as indicated

1. "Time Will Tell" - 7:54
2. "The Prisoner" (Herbie Hancock) - 10:39
3. "Herbal Blue" - 5:47
4. "Or Truth?" - 7:22
5. "Yellow Stars in Heaven" - 9:05
6. "Over & Out" - 7:53
7. "Dolphin Dance" (Hancock) - 2:06
8. "Toys" (Hancock) - 7:26
9. "Cantaloupe Island" (Hancock) - 4:40
10. "Woodpecker" - 4:25
11. "I'm Meshugah for My Sugah (And My Sugah's Meshugah for Me)" - 1:41

== Personnel ==
- Uri Caine - piano
- Dave Douglas - trumpet
- Don Byron - bass clarinet
- Josh Roseman - trombone
- Gary Thomas - tenor saxophone, flute
- Dave Holland - bass
- Ralph Peterson, Jr., - drums
- Don Alias - percussion
