= Love Fugue: Robert Schumann =

Studio album by Uri Caine Ensemble & La Gaia Scienza
- Released: 2000
- Recorded: 2000
- Genres: Classical music, Jazz
- Length: 65:15
- Label: Winter & Winter 910 049-2
- Producer: Stefan Winter

Uri Caine chronology
Gustav Mahler in Toblach (1999)	Love Fugue: Robert Schumann (2000)	The Goldberg Variations (2000)

Love Fugue: Robert Schumann is an album by pianist Uri Caine featuring selections from Robert Schumann's song cycle Dichterliebe (Op. 48) and Piano Quintet in E-flat major (Op. 44) recorded in 2000 and released on the Winter & Winter label.

== Reception ==
Professional ratings
Review scores
Source	Rating
Allmusic	4/5 stars
Tom Hull	C+
The Penguin Guide to Jazz Recordings	3/4 stars

In his review for Allmusic, Alex Henderson said "Caine takes more than his share of liberties with Schumann's compositions, bringing both jazz and Latin elements to them and allowing for improvisation some of the time ... Classical purists are bound to denounce this CD as musical blasphemy, but for those with more eclectic tastes, Love Fugue is a joy to listen to".

== Track listing ==
All compositions by Robert Schumann

1. "Im Wunderschönen Monat Mai" – 2:23
2. "Allegro" – 8:44
3. "Aus Meinen Tränen Spriessen" – 1:24
4. "Die Rose, Die Lilie, Die Taube" – 0:28
5. "Wenn Ich In Deine Augen Seh" – 1:57
6. "Scherzo" – 3:09
7. "Ich Will Meine Seele Tauchen" – 4:17
8. "Im Rhein, Im Heiligen Strome" – 2:10
9. "Ich Grolle Nicht" – 2:47
10. "Und Wüssten's Die Blumen" – 0:53
11. "Andante" – 6:13
12. "Das Ist Ein Floten Und Geigen" – 1:41
13. "Hor' Ich Das Liedchen Klingen" – 2:11
14. "Ein Jungling Liebt Ein Mädchen" – 3:03
15. "Am Leuchtenden Sommermorgen" – 3:10
16. "Finale" – 7:18
17. "Ich Hab' Im Traum Geweinet" – 3:46
18. "Allnächtlich Im Traume" – 1:50
19. "Aus Alten Märchen Winkt Es" – 2:48
20. "Die Alten Bösen Lieder" – 4:54

== Personnel ==
- Uri Caine – piano, arranger
- David Gilmore – guitar
- Stefano Barneschi – violin
- Marco Bianchi – viola
- Paolo Beschi – cello
- Federica Valli – fortepiano
- David Moss (tracks 4, 8 & 19), Mark Ledford (tracks 1, 3–5, 7–10, 12–15 & 17–20) – vocals
- Julie Patton (tracks 1, 15 & 17), Shulamith Wechter Caine (tracks 3 & 13) – recitation
- Mariko Takahashi – narration (tracks 5 & 7)
