= Gustav Mahler in Toblach =

1999 album

Live album by Uri Caine Ensemble
- Released: 1999
- Recorded: 19 July 1998
- Venues: Gustavv Mahler Festival, Toblach, Italy
- Genre: Classical music
- Label: Winter & Winter 910 046-2
- Producer: Stefan Winter

Uri Caine chronology
The Sidewalks of New York: Tin Pan Alley (1999)	Gustav Mahler in Toblach (1999)	Love Fugue: Robert Schumann (2000)

Professional ratings
Review scores
Source	Rating
Tom Hull	B+
The Penguin Guide to Jazz Recordings	4/4 stars

Gustav Mahler in Toblach (subtitled I Went Out This Morning Over the Countryside) is a live album by pianist Uri Caine's Ensemble, featuring compositions by Gustav Mahler, recorded in Italy and released as a double CD on the Winter & Winter label in 1999.

== Reception ==
David Adler, writing for All About Jazz, noted: "Classical purists haven't been too thrilled with Caine's efforts, but they aren't really his audience. Whether you'd rather listen to Uri Caine's Mahler or to Mahler himself is a subjective question. But one shouldn't deny Caine credit for teaching us something new about music's elasticity".

== Track listing ==
All compositions by Gustav Mahler

Disc One:

1. "Symphonie No. 5, Funeral March" – 7:06
2. "I Often Think They Have Merely Gone Out!" (from Songs on the Death of Children) 10:24
3. "Now Will the Sun Rise as Brightly" (from Songs on the Death of Children) – 5:35
4. "The Drummer Boy" (from The Boy's Magic Horn) – 14:03
5. "Introduction to Symphony No. 5, Adagietto" – 1:53
6. "Symphony No. 5, Adagietto" – 12:42

Disc Two:

1. "Symphony No. 1 "Titan", 3rd Movement" – 13:22
2. "I Went Out This Morning Over the Countryside, Symphony No. 2 "Resurrection", Andante Moderato" 13:26
3. "Symphony No. 2 "Resurrection", Primal Light" – 2:34
4. "Interlude to the Farewell" (from The Song of the Earth) – 1:49
5. "The Farewell" (from The Song of the Earth) – 26:25

== Personnel ==
- Uri Caine – piano, keyboards
- Ralph Alessi – trumpet
- David Binney – alto saxophone
- Mark Feldman – violin
- Aaron Bensoussan – oud, vocals
- DJ Olive – turntables, electronics
- Michael Formanek – bass
- Jim Black – drums
