= Shelf-Life (album) =

Studio album by Uri Caine
- Released: 2005
- Recorded: March 2004; Magic Shop, New York
- Genre: Jazz
- Length: 60:18
- Label: Winter & Winter 910 112-2
- Producer: Stefan Winter

Uri Caine chronology
Live at the Village Vanguard (2004)	Shelf-Life (2005)	Things (2006)

Shelf-Life is an album by the group Bedrock featuring keyboardist Uri Caine with bassist Tim Lefebvre and drummer Zach Danziger which was released on the Winter & Winter label in 2005.

== Reception ==
Professional ratings
Review scores
Source	Rating
PopMatters	7/10 stars
All About Jazz	4.5/5 stars
The Penguin Guide to Jazz Recordings	2.5/4 stars

PopMatters correspondent Will Layman said "The sense of parody, exaggeration, and pastiche is dead-on brilliant, at least the first time you hear the disc... The small details of Shelf-Life are utterly worth revisiting. Each time it sounds a bit less jammy and more organized. But it repays the kind of listens it’s hard to give in life—long, hard, sustained listens. If you’ve got the time and the inclination, well—Uri Caine has just the album for you". In his review for Allmusic, Scott Yanow notes that "This set takes a few listens to sort out, and it will either be loved or hated by jazz listeners, depending on their feelings toward electronic sounds". All About Jazz said "Depending on your personal tastes and breadth of exposure, the rapid and regular shifts in mood, style, and era on Shelf-Life may be energizing or disconcerting—probably a combination of the two. As for me, it all adds up to pure joy, in no small part due to the music's unpredictability. Caine, Danziger, and Lefebvre are not so reckless as to ever lose control, so individual tracks may wander a bit, but they never get lost. And that's absolutely key. Tightness is a virtue".

== Track listing ==
All compositions by Uri Caine, Tim Lefebvre & Zach Danziger except as indicated

1. "SteakJacket Prelude" – 3:56
2. "SteakJacket" – 3:17
3. "Defenestration" – 4:20
4. "Wolfowitz in Sheep's Clothing" – 5:20
5. "Blakey" – 3:40
6. "On the Shelf" (Caine, Lefebvre, Danzinger, Luke Vibert) – 3:27
7. "Darker Bionic Cue" – 2:59
8. "Strom's Theremin" – 5:19
9. "Oder" – 5:04
10. "Murray" – 3:30
11. "bE lOOse" (Caine, Lefebvre, Danzinger, Martin Baumgartner) – 2:14
12. "Watch Out!" – 2:23
13. "Bauwelklogge (Dedicated to Mel Lang)" – 4:56
14. "Shish Kabab Franklin" – 4:45
15. "Interruptus" (Caine, Lefebvre, Danzinger, Baumgartner) – 5:54
16. "Hello" – 3:59
17. "Sweat" (Caine, Lefebvre, Danzinger, Bunny Sigler) – 5:00

== Personnel ==
- Uri Caine – keyboards
- Tim Lefebvre – bass, guitar
- Zach Danziger – drums, percussion
- Arto Tuncboyaciyan – percussion (tracks 1, 5–6, 8)
- Luke Vibert – production, programming (tracks 6, 13, 17)
- Bootsie Barnes – tenor saxophone (tracks 10, 16–17)
- Ralph Alessi – trumpet (tracks 4, 9)
- nnnj – reconstruction worker (tracks 7, 11)
- DJ Olive – electronics (tracks 15–16)
- Barbara Walker – vocals (tracks 11, 17)
- Ruben Gutierrez – clarinet (track 10)
- Bunny Sigler – vocals (track 17)
- Dan Zank – string programming (track 17)
