= The Goldberg Variations (Uri Caine album) =

Studio album by Uri Caine Ensemble
- Released: August 15, 2000
- Recorded: October 1999 to January 2000
- Studios: Avatar (New York City); WDR Studio 2 (Köln, Germany); Boomish (New York City); GoodandEvil (New York City); Skin Tone Riddles (New York City); Westrax (New York City); Velour (New York City); Loft (Köln, Germany); Villa Medici-Giulini (Briosco, Italy); Bauer (Ludwigsburg, Germany)
- Genres: Classical music, Jazz
- Length: 155:15
- Label: Winter & Winter 910 054
- Producer: Stefan Winter

Uri Caine chronology
Love Fugue: Robert Schumann (2000)	The Goldberg Variations (2000)	The Philadelphia Experiment (2001)

The Goldberg Variations is a double CD album by pianist Uri Caine's Ensemble performing Johann Sebastian Bach's Goldberg Variations recorded in remembrance of 250th anniversary of his death and released on the Winter & Winter label.

== Reception ==
Professional ratings
Review scores
Source	Rating
AllMusic	4/5 stars
BBC ClassicalMusic.com	5/5 stars
The Penguin Guide to Jazz Recordings	3/4 stars

In his review for AllMusic, Alex Henderson said " Occasionally, this double-CD comes across as iconoclasm for the sake of iconoclasm; things become forced and unnatural when Caine employs DJs and unsuccessfully tries to convince us that hip-hop, electronica, and rave music can be relevant to Bach. But most of the time, his experimentation pays off handsomely. Goldberg Variations isn't for everyone; classical purists, in fact, will want to avoid it. But those who have very eclectic tastes in music will find that this 1999/2000 project, although not perfect, is highly imaginative and even fascinating". On All About Jazz Glenn Astarita said "Basically, one of the great attributes of this ambitious project is based upon Caine's ability to inject humor and disparate elements into his writings and arrangements; although, there's much more than meets the eye here as ideas abound with ceaseless invention and soulful articulation despite the semi austere implications. Perhaps the bottom line or desired effect of this project is contingent upon the relationships established between varying art forms and how all music is rooted and intertwined. Either way you view it, Caine's The Goldberg Variations is a magnificent event for the aural senses! Highly recommended". The BBC's ClassicalMusic.com said "Caine’s arrangements are wonderfully inventive and they’re brilliantly executed, too. Caine treats Bach’s original variations fairly soberly – most are played either on solo piano or by a Baroque chamber ensemble – but elsewhere he lets his imagination run riot... DJs, poets, a choral group, a gamba quartet, several notable jazzers and a gamut of vocalists also feature. There’s humour aplenty, yet Caine respects musicality – each variation is crafted with due expertise. Parody? Pastiche? It’s more a carnivalesque celebration of Bach’s enduring appeal. If only more tributes could be this bold, this creative, this much fun!"

== Track listing ==
All compositions adapted arranged and composed by Uri caine after Johann Sebastian Bach

Disc One:

1. "Aria" - 1:48
2. "Variation 1" - 1:03
3. "Variation 2" - 0:51
4. "The Introitus Variation" - 3:40
5. "The Dig It Variation" - 2:20
6. "Logic's Invention" - 0:38
7. "The Stuttering Variation" - 2:29
8. "Variation 3, Canon at the Unison" - 1:12
9. "The Hot Six Variation" - 2:43
10. "Variation 5 [+8]" - 1:26
11. "Rachmaninoff" - 1:52
12. "The Dr. Jekyll & Mr. Hyde Variation" - 3:57
13. "Vivaldi" - 0:50
14. "Variation for Saxophone & Piano" - 2:47
15. "Variation 4" - 1:07
16. "The Waltz Variation" - 1:01
17. "The Carol Variation" - 2:35
18. "Variation 6, Canon at the 2nd" - 0:42
19. "The Stomp Variation" - 2:26
20. "The Nobody Knows Variation" - 3:50
21. "Canon at the 3rd in 3/4" - 2:38
22. "Variation 7, Gigue" - 1:20
23. "Variation 9, Canon at the 3rd" - 1:41
24. "Variation 10, Fughetta" - 1:35
25. "Variation 11" - 1:57
26. "Variation for Violin & Piano" - 2:11
27. "Variation 12, Canon at the 4th" - 1:19
28. "Variation 13" - 2:24
29. "The Hallelujah Variation" - 1:46
30. "The Verdi Piano Duet Variation" - 1:28
31. "Luther's Nightmare Variation" - 2:17
32. "Canon at the 6th in 6/4" - 1:43
33. "The Jaybird Lounge Variation" - 2:33
34. "Variation 14" - 0:43
35. "Variation 15, Canon at the 5th" - 2:05
36. "The Contrapunto Variation" - 4:25
37. "Variation for Piano Solo No. 1" - 0:56
38. "Canon at the 5th in 5/4" - 2:34
39. "The Chorale Variation" - 1:12

Disc Two:

1. "Variation 16 [Overture]" - 1:47
2. "Don's Variation" - 2:32
3. "Variation for Vinicius" - 4:57
4. "Olive's Remix" - 0:40
5. "The »I Poem« Variation [Fughetta for 4 Voices]" - 2:43
6. "Variation 17" - 0:59
7. "Variation 18, Canon at the 6th" - 1:48
8. "Mozart" - 1:28
9. "Canon at the 7th in 7/4" - 1:40
10. "The Minimal Variation" - 3:28
11. "The Tango Variation" - 1:50
12. "The Boxy Variation" - 5:05
13. "Variation 19" - 2:11
14. "Variation 21, Canon at the 7th - 1:22
15. "The Wedding March Variation [For Ralph & Liz]" - 1:52
16. "Variation 22" - 1:41
17. "Variation for Gamba Quartet" - 1:59
18. "Canon at the 4th in 4/4" - 3:12
19. "Variation for Piano Solo No. 2" - 3:26
20. "Variation on B-A-C-H" - 2:30
21. "Variation for Cello Solo" - 2:34
22. "Händel" - 0:34
23. "Variation 23" - 1:00
24. "Variation 25" - 5:22
25. "Variation 26" - 1:01
26. "Variation 29" - 1:37
27. "Variation 30 Quodlibet" - 0:50
28. "Variation 30 Quodlibet / The Drinking Party" - 1:42
29. "Logic's Organ Prelude" - 0:48
30. "Uri's Organ Prelude" - 5:15
31. "The Blessing Variation" - 4:41
32. "Aria" - 1:54
33. "The Eternal Variation" - 2:43

== Personnel ==
- Uri Caine - piano, harpsichord, organ, Silbermann fortepiano
- Vittorio Ghielmi, Arno Jochem - viola da gamba
- Paul Plunkett - baroque trumpet
- Annegret Siedel, Gregor Hübner, Todd Reynolds - violin
- David Moss, Dean Bowman, Barbara Walker, Marco Bermudez, Vinicius Cantuária - vocals
- DJ Logic, DJ Olive - turntables, electronics
- Ralph Alessi - trumpet
- Don Byron - clarinet
- Ralph Peterson, Jr. - drums
- Josh Roseman - trombone
- Bob Stewart - tuba
- Michael Freimuth - lute
- Greg Osby - alto saxophone
- Reggie Washington - electric bass
- James Genus, Reid Anderson, Drew Gress - bass
- Cordula Breuer - alto recorder
- Milton Cardona - percussion
- Sadiq Bey, Tracie Morris - poetry
- Paulo Braga - drums
- Jörg Reiter - accordion
- Liz Alessi - bassoon
- Ernst Reijseger - cello
- Danny Blume, Chris Kelly, Zach Danziger, Tim Lefebvre - electronics

Quartetto Italiano di Viole da Gamba:

- Vittorio Ghielmi - viola basso
- Rodney Prada - viola tenore
- Paolo Biordi - viola soprano
- Cristiano Contadin - viola basso

Köln String Quartet:

- Annegret Siedel, Mary Utiger - violin
- Jane Oldham - viola
- Arno Jochem - cello

Kettwiger Bach Ensemble conducted by Wolfgang Kläsener

- Beate Gebauer, Franziska Jahr, Hildegard Singer, Petra Schnabel - soprano
- Anne-Katherine Schlegel, Patricia Just, Ulli Neumann - alto
- Hans-Joachim Kuhs, Kim Nguyen, Richard Martin-Markowski - tenor
- Guido Diesing, Lothar Düsterhus, Oliver Kopetzki - bass
