= Uri Caine =

American pianist and composer (born 1956)

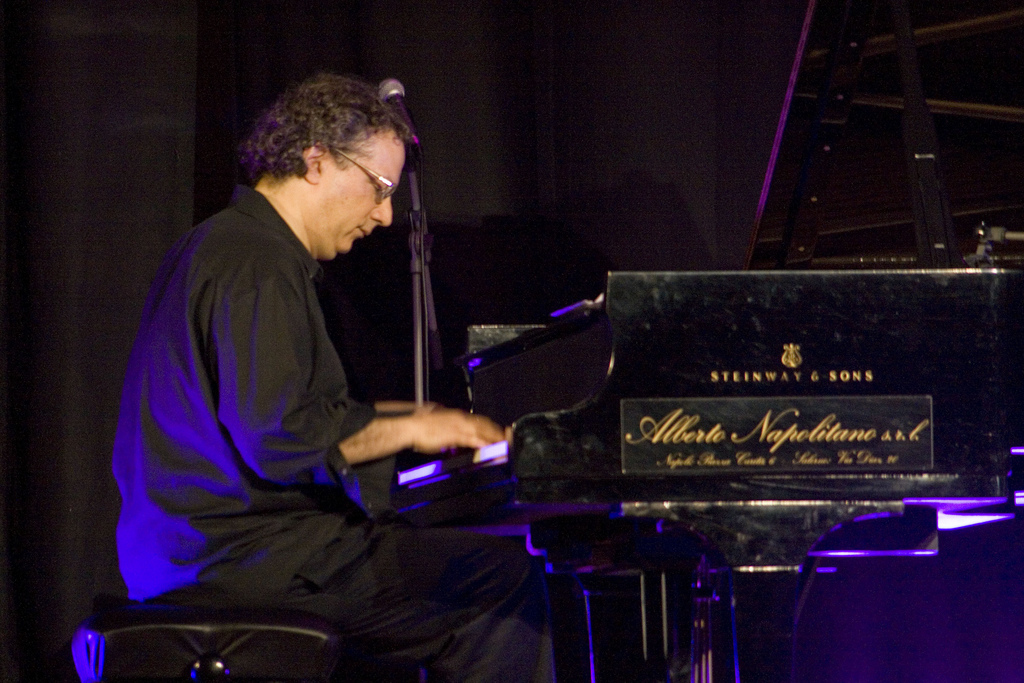
- Caine in 2006

Background information
- Born: June 8, 1956 (age 70); Philadelphia, Pennsylvania, U.S.
- Genres: Jazz, classical
- Occupations: Musician, composer
- Instrument: Piano

Uri Caine (born June 8, 1956) is an American classical and jazz pianist and composer from Philadelphia.

== Biography ==
=== Early years ===
Caine was born on June 8, 1956, in Philadelphia, to Burton Caine (1928–2023), a professor at Temple Law School, and poet Shulamith Wechter Caine. He began playing piano at age seven, and studied with French jazz pianist Bernard Peiffer at 12. He later studied at the University of Pennsylvania, where he came under the tutelage of George Crumb. He also gained a greater familiarity with classical music in this period and worked at clubs in Philadelphia.

Caine played professionally after 1981, and by 1985 had his recording debut with the Rochester-Gerald Veasley band. In the 1980s, he moved to New York City, where he continues to live. His solo recording debut was in 1992. He also appeared on a klezmer album (Don Byron Plays the Music of Mickey Katz, 1993) and other recordings with modern jazz musicians Don Byron and Dave Douglas, among many others.

=== Later years ===
Caine has recorded 16 mostly classical albums. His 1997 jazz tribute to Gustav Mahler received an award from the German Mahler Society, while outraging some jury members. Caine has also reworked Bach's Goldberg Variations, Beethoven's Diabelli Variations, as well as music by Wagner, Schumann and Mozart.

He was Composer-in-Residence of the Los Angeles Chamber Orchestra from 2005 to 2009. He became a United States Artists Fellow in 2010.

In 2012, he performed with the Armenian State Chamber Orchestra in Yerevan, Armenia, and, in 2013 and 2014, was Composer-in-Residence at Mannes College.

In 2019, Caine released an oratorio on the life and death of Octavius Catto.

=== The Bedrock Project and other collaborations ===
In 2001, he teamed up with drummer Zach Danziger to conceive an original project fusing live jungle and drum 'n' bass beats with fusion jazz called "Uri Caine Bedrock 3". They have toured worldwide, including with the New York-based DJ Olive.

Also in 2001, he released with drummer Ahmir "Questlove" Thompson of The Roots and Christian McBride an album called The Philadelphia Experiment which contains jazz, funk, instrumental hip hop and jazz fusion. This album was produced by Aaron Levinson and features collaborations such as Pat Martino on guitar and Jon Swana on trumpet.

In 2006, he recorded an album of composition from John Zorn's second Masada book called Moloch: Book of Angels Volume 6. In November 2012, Caine collaborated with drummer Han Bennink to release a live album entitled Sonic Boom. In 2008 he was special guest of the Italian jazz awards red carpet show in Genoa (Italy) at Teatro di Sant'Agostino.

== Discography ==
=== As leader/co-leader ===
Recording date	Title	Label	Year released	Notes / Personnel
1992–04, 1995–05	Sphere Music	JMT	1993	With Anthony Cox and Kenny Davis (bass; separately), Ralph Peterson, Jr., (drums), Graham Haynes (cornet), Don Byron (clarinet), Gary Thomas (tenor sax)
1995–02, 1995–03	Toys	JMT	1996	With Dave Douglas (trumpet), Don Byron (bass clarinet), Josh Roseman (trombone), Gary Thomas (tenor sax, flute), Dave Holland (bass), Ralph Peterson, Jr. (drums), Don Alias (percussion)
1996–06	Urlicht / Primal Light	Winter & Winter	1997	With Dave Douglas (trumpet), Josh Roseman (trombone), Dave Binney (soprano sax), Don Byron (clarinet), Mark Feldman (violin), Larry Gold (cello), Danny Blume (guitar, electronics), DJ Olive (turntables), Michael Formanek (bass), Joey Baron (drums), Aaron Bensoussan (hand drum, cantor), Arto Lindsay and Dean Bowman (vocals)
1997–06	Wagner e Venezia	Winter & Winter	1997	With Dominic Cortese (accordion), Mark Feldman and Joyce Hammann (violin), Erik Friedlander (cello), Drew Gress (bass); in concert
1997–12	Blue Wail	Winter & Winter	1999	Trio, with James Genus (bass), Ralph Peterson, Jr. (drums)
1998–07	Gustav Mahler in Toblach	Winter & Winter	1999	With Ralph Alessi (trumpet), David Binney (alto sax), Mark Feldman (violin), Aaron Bensoussan (oud, vocals), DJ Olive (turntables, electronics), Michael Formanek (bass), Jim Black (drums); in concert
1999–02	The Sidewalks of New York: Tin Pan Alley	Winter & Winter	1999	Bob DeBellis (flute), Ralph Alessi and Dave Douglas (trumpet; separately), Josh Roseman (trombone), Bob Stewart (tuba), Don Byron (clarinet), Dominic Cortese (accordion, vocals), Mark Feldman (violin), Eddy Davis (banjo), James Genus (bass), Ben Perowsky (drums), various vocalists
1999–10– 2000–01	The Goldberg Variations	Winter & Winter	2000	With various
2000	Love Fugue: Robert Schumann	Winter & Winter	2000	With David Gilmore (guitar), Stefano Barneschi (violin), Marco Bianchi (viola), Paolo Beschi (cello), Federica Valli (fortepiano), David Moss and Mark Ledford (vocals; separately), Julie Patton and Shulamith Wechter Caine (recitation; separately) Mariko Takahashi (narration)
2000–11	Solitaire	Winter & Winter	2001	Solo piano
2001–02	Bedrock 3	Winter & Winter	2001	With Tim Lefebvre (bass), Zach Danziger (drums); DJ Logic (turntables), Jessie System and Pete Davenport (vocals) added on some tracks
2001–06	Rio	Winter & Winter	2001	With various
2002–02	Diabelli Variations	Winter & Winter	2002	With Concerto Köln
1999–07– 2003–05	Gustav Mahler: Dark Flame	Winter & Winter	2003	With various
2003–05	Live at the Village Vanguard	Winter & Winter	2004	Trio, with Drew Gress (bass), Ben Perowsky (drums); in concert
2004–03	Shelf-Life	Winter & Winter	2005	As Bedrock; trio, with Tim Lefebvre (bass, guitar), Zach Danziger (drums, percussion); various guests added on some tracks
2005–05	Things	Blue Note	2006	Duo, with Paolo Fresu (trumpet, flugelhorn, effects)
2006–06	Uri Caine Ensemble Plays Mozart	Winter & Winter	2006	With Ralph Alessi (trumpet), Chris Speed (clarinet), Joyce Hammann (violin), Nguyên Lê (guitar), DJ Olive (turntables), Drew Gress (double bass), Jim Black (drums); in concert
2006–09	Moloch: Book of Angels Volume 6	Tzadik	2006	Solo piano
2007?	The Classical Variations	Winter & Winter	2007	
2007?	Pure Affection	Alessa	2007	Duo, co-led with Gust Tsilis
2005–02– 2008–03	The Othello Syndrome	Winter & Winter	2008	With Ralph Alessi (trumpet), Achille Succi and Chris Speed (clarinet), Joyce Hammann (violin), Nguyên Lê (guitar), Tim Lefebvre (bass, electric bass), John Hebert (bass), Jim Black and Zach Danziger (drums), Bruno Fabrizio Sorba and Stefano Bassanese (electronics), Bunny Sigler, Dhafer Youssef, Josefine Lindstrand, Julie Patton, Marco Paolini and Sadiq Bey (vocals)
2008–10	Think	Blue Note	2009	Co-led with Paolo Fresu, with Alborada String Quartet
2009–03	Plastic Temptation	Winter & Winter	2009	As Bedrock, with Tim Lefebvre (bass, guitar), Zach Danziger (drums), Elizabeth Pupo-Walker (percussion), Barbara Walker (vocals)
2009–06	Twelve Caprices	Winter & Winter	2010	Collaboration with Arditti String Quartet
2010–04	Sonic Boom	816	2012	Duo, co-led with Han Bennink (drums); in concert
2010–09	Siren	Winter & Winter	2011	Trio, with John Hébert (bass), Ben Perowsky (drums)
2012–12	Rhapsody in Blue	Winter & Winter	2013	With Ralph Alessi (trumpet), Jim Black (drums), Theo Bleckmann (vocals), Joyce Hammann (violin), Mark Helias (bass), Chris Speed (clarinet, tenor sax), Barbara Walker (vocals)
2012–12	Callithump	Winter & Winter	2014	Solo piano
2013–12	Present Joys	Greenleaf	2014	Duo, co-led with Dave Douglas (trumpet)
2015–02	Two Minuettos	Tŭk	2017	Duo, co-led with Paolo Fresu (trumpet, flugelhorn, effects); in concert

Collaborations
As The Philadelphia Experiment
(with Christian McBride, Ahmir "Questlove" Thompson, Pat Martino, John Swana, Larry Gold and Aaron Levinson)

- The Philadelphia Experiment (Ropeadope, 2001) – rec. 2000

With Mark Feldman, Greg Cohen and Joey Baron

- Secrets (Tzadik, 2009) – rec. 2008

=== As sideman ===
With Dave Douglas

- In Our Lifetime (New World, 1995)
- Stargazer (Arabesque, 1997) – live rec. 1996
- Soul on Soul (RCA, 2000)
- The Infinite (RCA, 2002) – rec. 2001
- Strange Liberation (Bluebird, 2004)
- Meaning and Mystery (Greenleaf, 2006)
- Live at the Jazz Standard (Greenleaf, 2007) – live rec. 2006

With John Zorn

- Voices in the Wilderness (Tzadik, 2003)
- Moloch: Book of Angels Volume 6 (Tzadik, 2006)
- Filmworks XXI: Belle de Nature/The New Rijksmuseum (Tzadik, 2008)
- Masada Quintet featuring Joe Lovano, Stolas: Book of Angels Volume 12 (Tzadik, 2009)

With others

- Don Byron, Don Byron Plays the Music of Mickey Katz (Nonesuch, 1993)
- Forma Antiqva, Antonio Vivaldi: The Four Seasons (Winter & Winter, 2011)
- Frank London, Nigunim (Tzadik, 1998)
- Zohar, Keter (Knitting Factory, 1999)
