= Ivey-Divey =

Studio album by Don Byron
- Released: 2004
- Genre: Jazz
- Label: Blue Note
- Producer: Hans Wendl

Don Byron chronology
You Are #6: More Music for Six Musicians (2001)	Ivey-Divey (2004)	Do the Boomerang: The Music of Junior Walker (2006)

Ivey-Divey is an album by the American musician Don Byron, released in 2004. He supported it with a North American tour. Byron, for "I Want to Be Happy", was nominated for a Grammy Award for "Best Jazz Instrumental Solo".

== Production ==
The album is a tribute to Lester Young's 1946 recordings with Nat King Cole and Buddy Rich; the title comes from one of Young's expressions about going with the flow. Byron, playing tenor saxophone and clarinet, was backed by Jack DeJohnette on drums and Jason Moran on piano. The trumpeter Ralph Alessi and the bassist Lonnie Plaxico contributed to a few tracks. "Abie the Fishman" refers to a gag from the Marx Brothers' Animal Crackers. "Freddie Freeloader" and "In a Silent Way" are versions of the Miles Davis compositions.

== Critical reception ==
Professional ratings
Review scores
Source	Rating
AllMusic	4/5 stars
The Gazette	4.5/5 stars
The Penguin Guide to Jazz Recordings	3.5/4 stars

The New York Times considered Ivey-Divey to be Byron's "best album in years". The Village Voice said that "DeJohnette, always a painterly drummer, evoked Rich's skittering, mostly brushes work on the CD but scattered each measure's beats to enable a wildly elastic, thoroughly modern sense of swing." The Gazette praised "Lefty Teachers at Home". Newsday listed Ivey-Divey as the third best jazz album of 2004 and noted that Young "would have dug the dreadlocked clarinetist, as much for the latter's love of the put-on as for his easy-does-it eclecticism."

== Track listing ==
No.	Title	Length
1.	"I Want to Be Happy"
2.	"Somebody Loves Me"
3.	"I Cover the Waterfront"
4.	"I've Found a New Baby"
5.	"Himm (For Our Lord and Kirk Franklin)"
6.	"The Good Drag"
7.	"Abie the Fishman"
8.	"Lefty Teachers at Home"
9.	"'Leopold, Leopold...'"
10.	"Freddie Freeloader"
11.	"In a Silent Way"
12.	"Somebody Loves Me" (Alternate Take)
