= John Kirby (musician) =

American jazz double-bassist and bandleader (1908–1952)

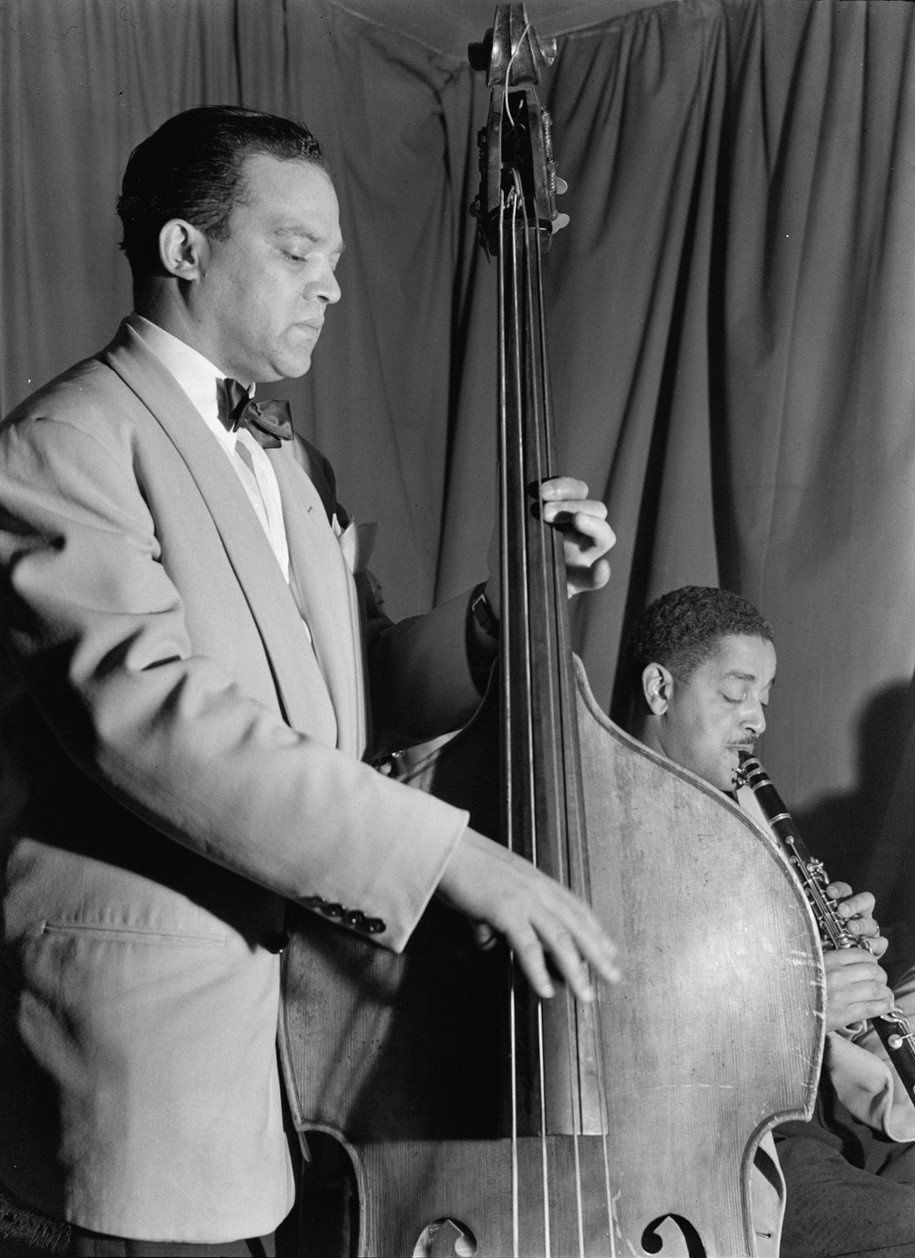
- Kirby and Buster Bailey, Washington D.C., c. May 1946; Photo: William P. Gottlieb

Background information
- Born: John Kirk; December 31, 1908; Winchester, Virginia, U.S.
- Died: June 14, 1952 (aged 43) Hollywood, California
- Genres: Jazz
- Occupation: Musician
- Instrument: Double bass

John Kirby (December 31, 1908 – June 14, 1952), was an American jazz double-bassist and bandleader. In addition to sideman work (prominently with Benny Goodman), Kirby lead a chamber jazz sextet in the late 1930s and early 1940s, which scored several hit songs including "Loch Lomond" and the debut recording of "Undecided", a jazz standard. He was the first musician in the chamber jazz genre. Earlier in his career he also played trombone and tuba.

== Background ==
Kirby was born John Kirk in Winchester, Virginia, United States, on 31 December 1908. His mother, Dolly Kirk (died October 1925) gave him up for adoption in 1908 and he was raised by Reverend Washington Johnson and his wife, Nancy, at 442 North Kent Street in Winchester. (Kirby is listed as a household member in the 1920 United States Federal Census, but not in the 1910 census.) Kirby was a student at the Winchester Colored School, renamed Douglass School in 1916. He took piano lessons from Nancy and valve trombone lessons around 1917 under the guidance of Professor Powell Gibson, the principal of Douglass School, as well as a math, drama, and music teacher. A photo of Kirby can be seen on page 13 of the History of Douglas School Winchester, Virginia by Judy Humbert and June Gaskins, Kirby's cousin. Kirby later stated that Bach's work fascinated him as a child and that he learned to play music just as it was written.

Kirby's formal education ended around 1923. That same year, he met Mary Moten of Airmont, Virginia and they married on 25 August 1925. On 14 December 1925, Mary gave birth to Yvonne Constance Kirk. Based on known affiliations (Yvonne, Powell Gibson, Mary Moten and former schoolmate, Anna Bertha), Kirby's biological father lived in Baltimore and was a frequent visitor to the Winchester area. Kirby left the Winchester area in 1928 as a trombonist and played in the Baltimore area for two years. By 1936, Kirby was a successful sideman on the New York City jazz scene and Yvonne, now a student at Douglass herself, heard stories about her successful father from Gibson.

== Bands and recording ==
In 1928, Kirby arrived in Baltimore, where he met trombonist Jimmy Harrison, saxophonist Coleman Hawkins and composer Duke Ellington. Harrison persuaded Kirby to switch from trombone to tuba. Shortly after his arrival in New York, Kirby played tuba with Bill Brown and His Brownies at the Star Ballroom on Forty-Second Street. Later, he performed with pianist Charlie Sheets at the Bedford Ballroom in Brooklyn and then with John C. Smith's Society Band at Harlem's Alhambra Ballroom.

Kirby joined the Fletcher Henderson orchestra as a tuba player in 1930. In the early 1930s, he performed some complicated tuba work on a number of Henderson's recordings, but switched to double-bass when tuba fell out of favor. In the early 1930s, Kirby took bass lessons from Pops Foster and Wellman Braud (bassist with Duke Ellington). About 1933 Kirby left Henderson to play two stints with drummer Chick Webb and His Orchestra, before returning to Henderson, and then join Lucky Millinder; he briefly led a quartet in 1935, but was usually employed as bassist in others' groups.

In 1937, Kirby played bass on two of Billie Holiday's earliest recording dates, both with pianist Teddy Wilson. John Hammond, who produced these sessions for Columbia Records, said, "He is by far the best bass player around. It had to be Kirby on the first Teddy Wilson-Billie Holiday recording date."

Securing a gig at the Onyx Club on 52nd Street in 1937 confirmed Kirby's status as a bandleader, although in the first Onyx Club line-up, it was singer-drummer Leo Watson who got featured billing. Kirby's sextet was soon known as the Onyx Club Boys, and took the shape it would basically hold until World War II, usually with Charlie Shavers (trumpet), Buster Bailey (clarinet), Russell Procope (alto saxophone), Billy Kyle (piano), O'Neil Spencer (drums). "The Biggest Little Band in the Land," as it was called it, began recording in August 1937 with a swing version of "Loch Lomond." The group's name would vary with time and depending on who was credited as session leader: John Kirby and His Onyx Club Boys, John Kirby and His Orchestra, Buster Bailey and His Rhythm Busters, Buster Bailey and His Sextet, The John Kirby Sextet. Vocals were often performed by Maxine Sullivan, who became Kirby's second wife in 1938 (divorced 1941). In 1938, four members of the group (Shavers, Bailey, Kyle and Kirby) participated in two recording sessions for Vocalion Records (11 May and 23 June) accompanying singer Billie Holiday as Billie Holiday and her Orchestra.

Kirby tended toward a lighter, classically influenced style of jazz, often referred to as chamber jazz, which has both strong defenders and ardent critics. He was prolific and popular from 1938 to 1941, but World War II took away Kyle and Procope; bad health claimed Spencer, who died from tuberculosis in 1944. Nevertheless, Kirby kept trying to lead a group in clubs and in the studio, occasionally managing to attract such talents as Dizzy Gillespie, Benny Carter, Ben Webster, Clyde Hart, Budd Johnson, and Zutty Singleton.

As Kirby's career declined, he drank heavily and was beset by diabetes. After the war, Kirby got the surviving sextet members back together, with Sarah Vaughan as vocalist, but the reunion did not last. A concert at Carnegie Hall in December 1950, with Bailey plus drummer Sid Catlett, attracted only a small audience, which "crushed Kirby's spirit and badly damaged what little was left of his career. Kirby moved to Hollywood, California, where he died, aged 43, just before a planned comeback.

Kirby and his orchestra had a 30-minute radio program, Flow Gently, Sweet Rhythm (also known as The John Kirby Show) on CBS April 7, 1940–January 12, 1941. The program also featured Sullivan and the Golden Gate Quartet. Kirby and Sullivan have been cited as "the first artist (black or white, big or small) to sponsor their own jazz-oriented series."

== Awards and honors ==
In 1993 Kirby was inducted into the North San Diego County, California Big Band and Jazz Hall of Fame. In 2010 a historical marker was placed in front of Kirby's childhood home located at 442 North Kent Street in Winchester, Va. The marker is listed on the Virginia Historical Registry commemorating Virginia's legacy of African American culture The Winchester Star 6/26/2010. Since 2004, Kirby has been honored at various locations in Winchester, Va., with the latest on April 9, 2022, at Shenandoah University. In 2008 New Yorker magazine listed The John Kirby Sextet album "Night Whispers 1938-1946, #26 of 100 essential jazz albums. On the same "Essential Jazz albums" list, Kirby performed tuba and bass on #6 Fletcher Henderson's "Tidal Wave", as tuba and bassist on #17 saxophonist Coleman Hawkins, "The Essential Sides Remastered", as bassist on #19 Billie Holiday's "Lady Day, The Masters Takes and Singles", and as bassist on #27 Chick Webb and His Orchestra with vocalist Ella Fitzgerald "Stompin at the Savoy."

In 1961, saxophonist Dave Pell recorded the tribute album I Remember John Kirby. Clarinetist Don Byron paid tribute to Kirby (along with Duke Ellington and Raymond Scott) on his 1996 album Bug Music.

== Discography ==
- 1938–39 John Kirby and His Orchestra The Chronological (Classics, 1994)
- 1939–41 John Kirby and His Orchestra The Chronological (Classics, 1994)
- 1941–43 John Kirby and His Orchestra The Chronological (Classics, 1994)
- 1945–46 John Kirby and His OrchestraThe Chronological (Classics, 1994)
- 1941.00 Complete Associated Transcriptions Vol. 1 (Storyville, 2000)
- 1941–43 Complete Associated Transcriptions Vol. 2 (Storyville, 2002)
- 1943–44 Complete Associated Transcriptions Vol. 3 (Storyville, 2002)
- John Kirby and His Orchestra (Columbia, 1951)
- Intimate Swing (Harmony/Columbia, 1958)
- Boss of the Bass (Columbia, 1977)
- John Kirby (Atlantis, 1986)
- The Biggest Little Band in the World (Living Era/ASV, 1999)
- Complete Columbia and RCA Recordings (2xCD) (Definitive Recs., 1992)
- Night Whispers (Jazz Legends, 2005)

=== As sideman ===
With Benny Goodman

- The Complete RCA Victor Small Group Recordings (RCA Victor, 1997)
