= 4 Play (Cold Sweat album) =

Studio album by Craig Harris
- Released: 1991
- Recorded: August 1990; Skyline Studios, NYC
- Genre: Jazz
- Length: 45:52
- Label: JMT; JMT 834 444
- Producer: Stefan F. Winter

Craig Harris chronology
Cold Sweat Plays J. B. (1989)	4 Play (1991)	F-Stops (1993)

4 Play is an album by trombonist Craig Harris' band Cold Sweat which was recorded in 1990 and released on the JMT label.

== Reception ==
The AllMusic review by Scott Yanow stated "Mixing together avant-garde players with funksters, the music is somewhat strange, disturbing, and ultimately a bore".

Professional ratings
Review scores
Source	Rating
AllMusic	1.5/5 stars

== Track listing ==
All compositions by Craig Harris except as indicated

1. "Foreplay One" – 0:49
2. "You Are Everything" (Linda Creed, Thom Bell) – 4:49
3. "'Round Midnight" (Thelonious Monk) – 6:13
4. "Spinning Around" (Don McPherson, Luther Simmons, Enrique Sylvester) – 3:49
5. "Foreplay Two" – 0:43
6. "If This World Were Mine" (Marvin Gaye) – 5:44
7. "The Secret Garden" (El Debarge, Quincy Jones, Rod Temperton, Siedah Garrett) – 3:13
8. "Foreplay Three" – 0:42
9. "Going in Circles" (Anita Poree, Jerry Peters) – 4:46
10. "In the Rain" (Tony Hester) – 3:33
11. "Whip Appeal" (Babyface, Perri "Pebbles" Reid) – 5:30
12. "Nefertiti" (Wayne Shorter) – 1:02
13. "La-La (Means I Love You)" (Thom Bell, William Hart) – 4:21
14. "Foreplay Four" – 0:47

== Personnel ==
- Craig Harris – trombone
- Eddie Allen – trumpet
- Sam Furnace – alto saxophone, baritone saxophone, flute
- Booker T. Williams, George Adams – tenor saxophone
- Brandon Ross, Fred Wells – electric guitar
- Douglas Booth – keyboards
- James Calloway (tracks 2, 3 & 6), Melvin Gibbs (tracks 4, 9, 10 & 13) – electric bass
- Damon Mendez – drums
- Kweyao Agyapon – percussion (track 4)
- Andy Bey (tracks 3 & 9), Sekou Sundiata (tracks 5, 8 & 14) – vocals
