= F-stop (disambiguation) =

F-stop is a measure of the light-gathering ability of an optical system such as a camera lens.

F-stop may also refer to:

- F-Stops, a 1993 jazz album by Craig Harris
- F-Stop Music, a subsidiary of Atlantic Records
- F-Stop, a video game prototype for Portal 2
