= Shelter (Craig Harris album) =

Studio album by Craig Harris and Tailgaters Tales
- Released: 1987
- Recorded: November & December 1986
- Studio: Mediasound (New York City)
- Genre: Jazz
- Length: 43:18
- Label: JMT; JMT 870 008
- Producer: Stefan F. Winter

Craig Harris chronology
Tributes (1985)	Shelter (1987)	Blackout in the Square Root of Soul (1988)

Shelter is an album by trombonist Craig Harris and Tailgaters Tales which was recorded in 1986 and released on the JMT label.

== Reception ==
The AllMusic review by Brian Olewnick called it "An uneven set, but the highlights and generally fine level of playing make Shelter worth a listen, depending on one's tolerance for mawkishness".

Professional ratings
Review scores
Source	Rating
AllMusic	2.5/5 stars
The Penguin Guide to Jazz Recordings	3/4 stars

== Track listing ==
All compositions by Craig Harris

1. "Africans Unite" – 4:42
2. "Shelter Suite:" – 17:26
  1. "Shelter"
  2. "Subway Scenarios"
  3. "Sea of Swollen Hands"
  4. "Three Hots and a Cot"
  5. "Shelter (Reprise)"
  6. "Bags and Rags"
3. "Cootie" – 7:12
4. "Reminiscing" – 4:56
5. "Sound Sketches" – 9:00

== Personnel ==
- Craig Harris – trombone, didgeridoo
- Don Byron – clarinet, bass clarinet
- Eddie Allen – trumpet
- Anthony Cox – bass
- Pheeroan Aklaff – drums
- Rod Williams – piano (track 1)
- Tunde Samuel – vocals (tracks 1 & 2)
