= Romance with the Unseen =

Studio album by Don Byron
- Released: September 21, 1999
- Genre: Jazz
- Label: Blue Note
- Producers: Don Byron, Hans Wendl

Don Byron chronology
Nu Blaxploitation (1998)	Romance with the Unseen (1999)	A Fine Line: Arias and Lieder (2000)

Romance with the Unseen is an album by the American musician Don Byron, released on September 21, 1999. He supported the album with a North American tour. Due in part to the album, Byron was chosen as "Clarinetist of the Year" in a DownBeat readers' poll.

== Production ==
The album was produced by Byron and Hans Wendl. Byron was backed by Jack DeJohnette on drums, Drew Gress on bass, and Bill Frisell on guitar. Byron considered many of the songs to be about romantic relationships and his inability to separate his political opinions from his personal interactions. He took a more relaxed approach to recording, seeking out people he wanted to play with and choosing not to worry about technical aspects of his playing or commercial prospects. "I'll Follow the Sun" is a version of the Beatles song. "Perdido (Pegao)" is a take on the composition made famous by Duke Ellington. "One Finger Snap" was written by Herbie Hancock. "Basquiat" is a tribute to the American artist Jean-Michel Basquiat. "Homegoing" is based on one of Byron's favorite and much used melodies. "Bernhard Goetz, James Ramseur, and Me" references the 1984 New York City Subway shooting.

== Critical reception ==
Professional ratings
Review scores
Source	Rating
AllMusic	4/5 stars
The Gazette	9/10
Los Angeles Times	2.5/4 stars
The Penguin Guide to Jazz on CD	3/4 stars
Sound & Vision	4.5/5 stars
The Sydney Morning Herald	4/5 stars

The Gazette said that "Frisell's moody, impressionistic guitar serves as a perfect backdrop to Byron's clean, articulate clarinet". The Chicago Sun-Times noted that "few contemporary musicians roam the stylistic landscape as restlessly or rewardingly as clarinetist Don Byron". The Los Angeles Times opined that "despite the players' skill and the music's appeal as an intellectual exercise, the music seems unfulfilled." Sound & Vision called "I'll Follow the Sun" "one of the most beguiling jazz interpretations of the Beatles."

The Globe and Mail said that Byron's "clarinet, for all of its piping melody and pure tones, probably couldn't have carried the disc without the assistance of Frisell". The Irish Times concluded that "Byron spins a series of solos that rely for impact more on their logic and originality of line than on tone". The Independent said, "Byron's sounds are beautifully airy, on a set of free-floating tunes whose delicate treatment by the band creates a very superior form of chamber-jazz, with none of the usual stuffiness that term implies."

== Track listing ==
No.	Title	Length
1.	"A Mural from Two Perspectives"
2.	"Bad Twilight"
3.	"Bernhard Goetz, James Ramseur, and Me"
4.	"I'll Follow the Sun (For EAMR)"
5.	"'Lude"
6.	"Homegoing"
7.	"One Finger Snap"
8.	"Basquiat"
9.	"Perdido (Pegao)"
10.	"Closer to Home"
