= Jean-Paul Bourelly =

American guitarist (born 1960)

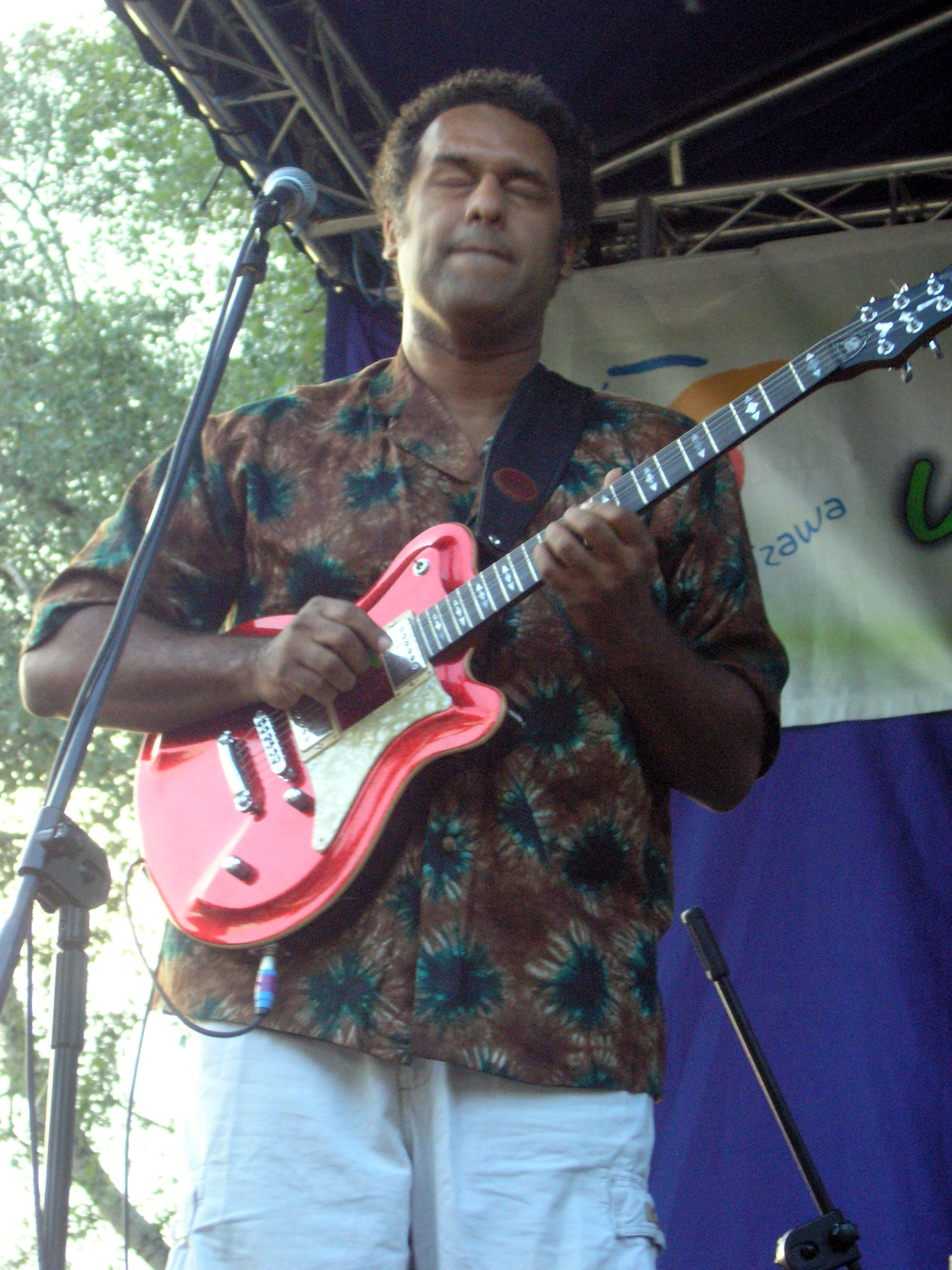
- Jean-Paul Bourelly, Warsaw Summer Jazz Days, 2006

Background information
- Born: Jean-Paul Etienne Bourelly; November 23, 1960 (age 65); Chicago, Illinois, U.S.
- Genres: Jazz fusion; rock; avant-rock; blues; world
- Occupations: Musician; singer; composer; record producer; label owner
- Instrument: Guitar
- Years active: 1980–present
- Website: www.bourelly.com

Jean-Paul Etienne Bourelly (born November 23, 1960) is an American guitarist whose music crosses the boundaries of jazz fusion and rock.

Bourelly was born in Chicago, Illinois, to parents from Haiti. His grandmother taught him Yoruba music. When he was ten years old, he sang at the Lyric Opera. He took lessons on piano and drums. He played acoustic guitar, but after hearing Jimi Hendrix on the radio, he bought an electric guitar with money he had saved from working at his uncle's gas station. During the same year, a late-night radio show introduced him to the music of Charlie Parker, which impressed him.

In 1979, he moved to New York City. During the 1980s, he worked with Muhal Richard Abrams, Olu Dara, Roy Haynes, Elvin Jones, Pharoah Sanders, McCoy Tyner, Steve Coleman, Marc Ribot, Elliott Sharp, Archie Shepp, and David Torn. He produced albums for Cassandra Wilson. He got a small role in the film The Cotton Club directed by Francis Ford Coppola. Near the end of the decade, he played on Amandla, one of Miles Davis's last albums. In 1987, he released his first solo album, Jungle Cowboy, and through 1995 he led the BluWave Bandits.

Bourelly said that when he moved to Europe in the 1990s, his music became difficult to classify, and that it combines his Haitian heritage, African rhythms, blues, and rock. He founded the record label JPGotMangos and led several groups during the 2000s, including 3kings, Citizen X, and Blues Bandits.

His daughter Bibi Bourelly is a singer and songwriter. She was born in Berlin to Bourelly and a German woman who was the head of the Art Department at Berlin's House of the World’s Cultures. He raised Bibi after her mother died, and she grew up close to professional musicians.

== Discography ==
=== As leader ===
- Jungle Cowboy (JMT, 1987)
- Trippin (Enemy, 1992)
- Saints & Sinners (DIW, 1993)
- Blackadelic-Blu (DIW, 1994)
- Tribute to Jimi (DIW, 1995)
- Live! Fade to Cacophony (DIW, 1995)
- Rock the Cathartic Spirits (DIW, 1996)
- Mag Five with Harry Sokal, Lonnie Plaxico, Ronnie Burrage (PAO, 1998)
- Vibe Music (PAO, 1999)
- Boom Bop (PAO, 2000)
- Trance Atlantic (Boom Bop II) (Double Moon, 2001)
- News from a Darked Out Room (Phonector, 2006)
- CutMotion (JPGotMangos, 2007)
- Kiss the Sky with Daryl Taylor, Kenny Martin (JPGotMangos, 2018)

=== As sideman ===
With Cassandra Wilson

- Point of View (JMT, 1986)
- Days Aweigh (JMT, 1987)
- She Who Weeps (JMT, 1991)
- Dance to the Drums Again (Columbia, 1992)
- Songbook (JMT, 1995)

With others

- George Adams, Old Feeling (Blue Note, 1991)
- Muhal Richard Abrams, Blues Forever (Black Saint, 1982)
- Muhal Richard Abrams, Rejoicing with the Light (Black Saint, 1983)
- Ayibobo, Freestyle (DIW, 1993)
- Ayibobo, Stone Voudou (DIW, 2003)
- Bell Biv DeVoe, Poison (MCA, 1990)
- Charles & Eddie, Duophonic (Capitol, 1992)
- D-Nice, To Tha Rescue (Jive, 1991)
- Miles Davis, Amandla (Warner Bros., 1989)
- Defunkt, A Blues Tribute Jimi Hendrix & Muddy Waters (Enemy, 1994)
- Pee Wee Ellis, Blues Mission (Gramavision, 1993)
- Craig Harris, Blackout in the Square Root of Soul (JMT, 1988)
- Graham Haynes, Transition (Antilles, 1995)
- Vincent Henry, Vincent (Jive, 1990)
- Hi-Five, Keep It Goin' On (Jive, 1992)
- DJ Jazzy Jeff & The Fresh Prince, Ring My Bell (Jive, 1991)
- Elvin Jones & McCoy Tyner Love & Peace (Trio, 1982)
- Butch Morris, Dust to Dust (New World, 1991)
- Butch Morris, Possible Universe (Nu Bop, 2014)
- Marvin Peterson, Visions of a New World (Atlantic, 1989)
- Jeff Redd, A Quiet Storm (Uptown/MCA, 1990)
- Sonya Robinson, Sonya (Columbia, 1987)
- Roz, A-Yo Ah'Ite (ZYX Music, 1994)
- Omar Sosa, Tales from the Earth (Ota, 2009)
- Stone Raiders, Truth to Power (Yellowbird, 2012)
- Jamaaladeen Tacuma, Brotherzone (P-Vine, 1999)
- Jamaaladeen Tacuma, Revolutionary Royalty (Jam-All, 2014)
