= Cold Sweat Plays J. B. =

Studio album by Craig Harris
- Released: 1989
- Recorded: November 1988
- Studio: Mediasound, New York City
- Genre: Jazz
- Length: 40:37
- Label: JMT; JMT 834 426
- Producer: Stefan F. Winter

Craig Harris chronology
Blackout in the Square Root of Soul (1988)	Cold Sweat Plays J. B. (1989)	4 Play (1991)

Cold Sweat Plays J. B. is an album by trombonist Craig Harris' tribute band Cold Sweat performing compositions by James Brown which was recorded in 1988 and released on the JMT label.

== Reception ==
The AllMusic review by Ron Wynn called it "As fine an example of applying improvisational élan to R&B/soul idiom as you can find in the 80s".

Professional ratings
Review scores
Source	Rating
AllMusic	3/5 stars

== Track listing ==
All compositions by James Brown except as indicated

1. "Brown's Prance" (Craig Harris) – 0:52
2. "Give It Up or Turnit a Loose" (Charles Bobbit) – 6:52
3. "It's a Man's Man's Man's World" (Brown, Betty Jean Newsome) – 6:51
4. "I Got the Feelin'" – 0:17
5. "Brown's Dance" (Harris) – 3:45
6. "Showtime Medley:" – (6:26)
  1. "Funky Good Time – 1:45
  2. "I Got the Feelin'" – 0:17
  3. "I Can't Stand It" – 0:56
  4. "Licking Stick" (Brown, Bobby Byrd, Alfred Ellis) – 0:40
  5. "There Was a Time" (Brown, Buddy Hopgood) – 6:26
7. "Please, Please, Please" (Brown, Johnny Terry) – 4:38
8. "Try Me" – 3:41
9. "Cold Sweat" (Brown, Ellis) – 7:25

== Personnel ==
- Craig Harris – trombone, vocals, music director
- Eddie Allen – trumpet
- Kenny Rogers – alto saxophone, soprano saxophone
- Booker T. Williams – tenor saxophone
- Brandon Ross, Fred Wells – electric guitar
- Clyde Criner – keyboards
- Alonzo Gardner – electric bass
- Damon Mendez – drums
- Kweyao Agyapon – percussion

Guests:

- Olu Dara – trumpet (tracks 2 & 7)
- Arthur Blythe – alto saxophone (tracks 2 & 3)
- David Murray – tenor saxophone (tracks 5 & 9)
- Kenyatte Abdur-Rahman – percussion (track 6)
- Sekou Sundiata – vocals (tracks 2 & 6)
