= Ayibobo =

American mizik rasin band

- Origin: New York City, United States
- Genres: Mizik rasin, jazz, world music
- Label: DIW Records
- Members: Wilfred "Tido" Lavaud; Chico Boyer; Julius "Ju Ju" House; Muneer B. Fennell; Gaston "Bonga" Jean-Baptiste; Jimmy Rock; Jean-Paul Bourelly; Tido Gaston; Jacques "Doudou" Chancy; Thurgot Theodat; Booker T.; Rosna
- Past members: Craig Harris; Vincent Henry; Rob Robinson; Kenny Martin; Mathias Agbokou

Ayibobo is a band from New York City, United States that is Jean-Paul Bourelly's side project. Ayibobo is one spelling of a Haitian Creole word that means "amen". MusicHound described the band as combining "Haitian singers and drummers with jazz horns, Bourelly's style, and EU drummer Ju Ju House."

Although the band is from New York, most of the band members are Haitian. The band released their first album Freestyle in 1993, produced by Jean-Paul Bourelly and Kazunori Sugiyama. The album was recorded in New York City from April to May 1993. The Wire magazine said that on the album Bourelly "immersed his wonderfully jarring, new-Hendrix sound in the chants and polyrhythms of non-geographically specific Africa. It’s tightly played and well recorded, occasionally hinting at some new kind of psychedelic funk, but you can't help wishing Bourelly would step out and wail like we know he can." AllMusic called Freestyle "danceable, pan-cultural jazz at its most enjoyable".

Their second album Stone Voudou was released in 2003, also on DIW Records. It is composed of live recordings of a concert spanning five nights performed in August 2001 in Berlin, Germany.

== Discography ==
Year	Album	Label	Notes
1993	Freestyle	DIW Records	
2003	Stone Voudou	DIW Records	

== Band members ==
Lineup (as of 1993)

- Wilfred "Tido" Lavaud – Lead vocals
- Chico Boyer – Bass guitar
- Julius "Ju Ju" House – Drums
- Gaston "Bonga" Jean-Baptiste – Drums
- Jean-Paul Bourelly – Guitar
- Craig Harris – Trombone
- Vincent Henry – Alto saxophone
- Rob Robinson – Organ
- Booker T. – Tenor saxophone

Lineup (as of 2003)

- Chico Boyer – Bass, drums, instruments (vaksin, konè), vocals
- Muneer B. Fennell – Cello
- Gaston "Bonga" Jean-Baptiste – Congas, percussion, instruments (vaksin, konè), vocals
- Jimmy Rock – Congas, percussion, vocals
- Kenny Martin – Drums
- Jean-Paul Bourelly – Guitar, drums, vocals
- Mathias Agbokou – Percussion, vocals
- Jacques "Doudou" Chancy – Saxophone, percussion, instruments (vaksin, konè), vocals
- Rosna – Vocals, percussion

Lineup (current)

- Wilfred "Tido" Lavaud – Vocals, guitar
- Chico Boyer – Bass, percussion
- Julius "Ju Ju" House – House drums
- Muneer B. Fennell – Cello
- Gaston "Bonga" Jean-Baptiste – Vocals, percussion
- Jimmy Rock – Drums
- Jean-Paul Bourelly – Guitar, percussion
- Tido Gaston – Vocals, percussion
- Jacques "Doudou" Chancy – Alto sax
- Thurgot Theodat – Alto sax
- Booker T. – Tenor sax
- Rosna – Vocals, percussion
