= Tuskegee Experiments (album) =

Studio album by Don Byron
- Released: 1992
- Recorded: 1990–1991
- Genre: Jazz
- Length: 61:19
- Label: Elektra/Nonesuch
- Producer: Arthur Moorhead

Don Byron chronology
| Tuskegee Experiments (1992) | Don Byron Plays the Music of Mickey Katz (1993) |

Tuskegee Experiments is an album by the American jazz clarinettist Don Byron, released in 1992. Its title refers to the Tuskegee syphilis experiment — the notorious medical experiment conducted around Tuskegee, Alabama, lasting from 1932 to 1972, in which 400 subjects, mainly poor, black sharecroppers, were used in an investigation of the effects of syphilis without their knowledge or consent.

== Critical reception ==
Professional ratings
Review scores
| Source | Rating |
|---|---|
| AllMusic | 4/5 stars |

Rolling Stone wrote that "Byron displays all his prowess as both an instrumentalist and a gleeful provocateur ever willing to shake things up." The Morning Call stated that "Byron and his quartet play with abandon and without any undue reverence to the past."

== Track listing ==
1. "Waltz for Ellen" (Byron) –3:05
2. "Tuskegee Strutter's Ball" (Byron) –8:08
3. "In Memoriam: Uncle Dan" (Byron) –5:20
4. "Next Love" (Byron) –9:50
5. "Tears" (Byron) –8:12
6. "Main Stem" (Ellington) –7:26
7. "Diego Rivera" (Byron) –9:23
8. "Tuskegee Experiment" (Byron) –6:27
9. "Auf einer Burg" (Schumann) –3:28

(recorded November 1990 and July 1991.)

== Personnel ==
- Don Byron – clarinet, bass clarinet
- Greta Buck – violin
- Bill Frisell – guitar
- Joe Berkovitz – piano
- Edsel Gomez – piano
- Richie Schwarz – marimba
- Kenny Davis – bass
- Lonnie Plaxico – bass
- Reggie Workman – bass
- Pheeroan akLaff – drums
- Ralph Peterson – drums
