= Blackout in the Square Root of Soul =

Studio album by Craig Harris and Tailgaters Tales
- Released: 1988
- Recorded: November 1987; RPM Studios, New York City
- Genre: Jazz
- Length: 39:39
- Label: JMT; JMT 880 015
- Producer: Stefan F. Winter

Craig Harris chronology
| Shelter (1987) | Blackout in the Square Root of Soul (1988) | Cold Sweat Plays J. B. (1989) |

Blackout in the Square Root of Soul is an album by trombonist Craig Harris and Tailgater's Tales which was recorded in 1987 and released on the JMT label.

== Reception ==
The AllMusic review by Brian Olewnick called it "An ambitious but ultimately unsuccessful venture".

Professional ratings
Review scores
| Source | Rating |
|---|---|
| AllMusic | 2.5/5 stars |
| The Penguin Guide to Jazz Recordings | 2.5/4 stars |

== Track listing ==
All compositions by Craig Harris

1. "Blackout in the Square Root of Soul" – 9:55
2. "Phase I - Phase II - Generations" – 3:55
3. "Free I" – 7:09
4. "Love Joy" – 6:00
5. "Blues Dues" – 2:25
6. "Dingo" – 4:53
7. "Awakening Ancestors" – 5:22

== Personnel ==
- Craig Harris – trombone, didgeridoo, vocals
- Don Byron – clarinet, bass clarinet
- Eddie Allen – trumpet
- Jean-Paul Bourelly – guitar
- Clyde Crinner – keyboards
- Anthony Cox – bass
- Ralph Peterson Jr. – drums
