= Quiver (Ron Miles album) =

Studio album / Live album by Ron Miles
- Released: October 12, 2012
- Recorded: September 2011
- Venue: Dazzle Jazz Club, Denver CO
- Studio: Mighty Fine Productions, Denver, CO
- Genre: Jazz
- Length: 66:15
- Label: Yellowbird yeb-7728
- Producer: Hans Wendl

Ron Miles chronology
Stone / Blossom (2006)	Quiver (2012)	Circuit Rider (2014)

Quiver is an album by trumpeter Ron Miles with guitarist Bill Frisell and drummer Brian Blade which was released on the Yellowbird label in 2012.

== Reception ==
Professional ratings
Review scores
Source	Rating
All About Jazz	4.5/5 stars

On All About Jazz, Mark F. Turner said "there are more subdued voices who let their music do the talking, as is the case for Ron Miles' Quiver, a project led by the Denver-based trumpeter and his talented cohorts, guitarist Bill Frisell and drummer Brian Blade. These gentle masters are highly respected leaders with expansive discographies and projects that have covered a wide spectrum of contemporary music ... Quiver celebrates the iconic sounds of Americana, juxtaposing its historical and contemporary contexts ... The release epitomizes Miles' style as he quietly leaves his mark as an exemplary trumpeter".

In JazzTimes Jeff Tamarkin wrote "Quiver remains robust and engaging even while the players demonstrate a mutual understanding of the value of breathing room, and if it seems that a trumpet-guitar-drums trio might need to work extra hard to generate sparks, that just happens naturally. And it happens without grandstanding. No one is striving for complexity". Stereophile's Fred Kaplan observed "This is a trio album as oddball as its name, with Bill Frisell on electric guitar and Brian Blade on drums: no piano, no bass, no other horns. You’d expect it to sound threadbare; it’s not ... There’s an intimacy to these sessions; the instruments are vivid and natural. This is an extremely likeable recording".

The NPR review by Michelle Mercer stated "A quiet purposefulness pervades Quiver, which is refreshingly free of concept or backstory. When musicians as perceptive and responsive as Ron Miles, Bill Frisell and Brian Blade come together, the result is sublime". Radio National's Doug Spencer observed "Ego-free conversations between three humble masters: Quiver is wide open, precisely focused, highly imaginative and very tender".

== Track listing ==
All compositions by Ron Miles except where noted

1. "Bruise" – 9:30
2. "Queen B" – 6:25
3. "Mr. Kevin" – 5:55
4. "There Ain't No Sweet Man That's Worth The Salt of My Tears" (Fred Fisher) – 10:49
5. "Just Married" – 7:00
6. "Doin' the Voom Voom" (Duke Ellington) – 6:16
7. "Days of Wine And Roses" (Henry Mancini, Johnny Mercer) – 10:04
8. "Rudy-Go-Round" – 6:02
9. "Guest of Honor" – 4:16
- Recorded at Mighty Fine Productions, Denver, CO (tracks 2–4, 6, 8 & 9) and the Dazzle Jazz Club, Denver CO (tracks 1, 5 & 7) in September 2011

== Personnel ==
- Ron Miles – trumpet, sattva
- Bill Frisell – guitar
- Brian Blade – drums
