= Bug Music (album) =

Studio album by Don Byron
- Released: 1996
- Recorded: May 1996
- Studios: Master Sound, Astoria, NY
- Genre: Jazz
- Length: 53:12
- Label: Nonesuch 7559-79313
- Producer: Don Byron

Don Byron chronology
No Vibe Zone (1996)	Bug Music (1996)	Nu Blaxploitation (1998)

Bug Music is an album by clarinetist Don Byron featuring music from the 1930s, specifically that of Duke Ellington, Billy Strayhorn, John Kirby, and Raymond Scott. It was released on the Nonesuch label in 1996.

== Reception ==
Professional ratings
Review scores
Source	Rating
AllMusic	4.5/5 stars

The AllMusic review by Scott Yanow stated, "Other than a silly rendition of Ellington's 'Blue Bubbles' and an adventurous interpretation of 'Snibor,' the selections are played with respect and great understanding of the somewhat forgotten style. None of the modern musicians sound as if swing were only their second language, making the continually surprising set a major success."

The album peaked at No. 4 on the Billboard jazz charts in February 1997.

== Track listing ==
All music transcribed and arranged by Don Byron.

1. "The Dicty Glide" (Duke Ellington) – 3:15
2. "Frasquita Serenade" (F. Lehar, H. Reichert, A.M. Willner) – 2:50
3. "St. Louis Blues" (William C. Handy) – 2:52
4. "Wondering Where" (Charles Shavers) – 2:50
5. "Bounce of the Sugar Plum Fairies" (Tchaikovsky, Louis C. Singer) – 1:39
6. "Charley's Prelude" (Louis C. Singer) – 2:47
7. "Royal Garden Blues" (Clarence Williams, Spencer Williams) – 1:50
8. "Siberian Sleighride" (Raymond Scott) – 2:50
9. "The Penguin" (Raymond Scott) – 2:47
10. "The Quintet Plays Carmen" (Raymond Scott) – 2:51
11. "Powerhouse" (Raymond Scott) – 2:54
12. "Tobacco Auctioneer" (Raymond Scott) – 2:35
13. "War Dance for Wooden Indians" (Raymond Scott) – 2:32
14. "Cotton Club Stomp" (Duke Ellington, Harry Carney, Johnny Hodges) – 2:45
15. "Blue Bubbles" (Duke Ellington) – 3:24
16. "SNIBOR" (Billy Strayhorn) – 9:48

== Personnel ==
- Don Byron – clarinet, baritone saxophone, conductor
- Steve Wilson – alto saxophone
- Robert DeBellis – tenor saxophone
- Charles Lewis – trumpet
- Steven Bernstein – trumpet
- James Zollar – trumpet
- Craig Harris – trombone
- Uri Caine – piano, vocals
- Paul Meyers – banjo
- David Gilmore – guitar
- Kenny Davis – bass
- Pheeroan akLaff – drums
- Billy Hart – drums
- Joey Baron – drums
- Dean Bowman – vocals
