= Live (Bill Frisell album) =

Live album by Bill Frisell
- Released: 1995
- Recorded: October 27, 1991
- Venue: Terceros Encuentros de Nueva Musica, Teatro Lope de Vega, Sevilla, Spain
- Genre: Post-bop
- Length: 71:23
- Label: Gramavision
- Producer: Hans Wendl

Bill Frisell chronology
The High Sign/One Week (1995)	Live (1995)	Quartet (1996)

Live is a live album by guitarist Bill Frisell released on the Gramavision label. It was released in 1995 and features a performance by Frisell, bassist Kermit Driscoll and drummer Joey Baron recorded in 1991 at Terceros Encuentros de Nueva Musica, Teatro Lope de Vega, Seville, Spain.

== Reception ==
The AllMusic review by Rick Anderson awarded the album 4.5 stars, stating, "This album finds Frisell onstage with bassist Kermit Driscoll and drummer Joey Baron, running through a few faves ("Throughout," "Strange Meeting," "When We Go"), as well as some more obscure and surprising material. Driscoll is a sharply intuitive bassist with a reggae player's feel for silence; Baron punctuates more than he undergirds. As a result, this is largely music without groove. Instead, it hovers and floats overhead like a benevolent thunderstorm, sometimes letting loose rumbling, atonal chaos like "Crumb" and sometimes emitting bolts of pure electric light such as the utterly charming "Rag" and the yearning sweetness of "Throughout." "Pip, Squeak/Goodbye" steps briefly into tango territory, and Frisell takes the Sonny Rollins composition "No Moe" all the way back to the Delta with a bent blues solo. The John Hiatt cover, by the way, is the emotional centerpiece of the album: a deeply felt rendition of "Have a Little Faith in Me." This is a very special disc."

Professional ratings
Review scores
Source	Rating
Allmusic	4.5/5 stars

== Track listing ==
All tracks are by Bill Frisell except as noted.

1. "Throughout" – 6:42
2. "Rag" – 5:17
3. "Crumb / No Moe" (Frisell / Sonny Rollins) – 6:35
4. "Have a Little Faith in Me" (John Hiatt) – 5:12
5. "Pip, Squeak / Goodbye" – 8:56
6. "Hello Nellie" – 8:13
7. "Strange Meeting" – 6:45
8. "Hangdog" – 3:25
9. "Child at Heart" – 10:39
10. "Again" – 5:50
11. "When We Go" – 3:50

== Personnel ==
- Bill Frisell – guitar
- Kermit Driscoll – bass
- Joey Baron – drums
