= Go West: Music for the Films of Buster Keaton =

Music for the Films of Buster Keaton: Go West

Studio album by Bill Frisell
- Released: 1995
- Recorded: 1995
- Studio: Möbius Music, San Francisco
- Genre: Jazz fusion Post-bop; Americana; Film soundtrack
- Length: 69:19
- Label: Elektra Nonesuch
- Producer: Lee Townsend

Bill Frisell chronology
This Land (1994)	Music for the Films of Buster Keaton: Go West (1995)	The High Sign/One Week (1995)

Music for the Films of Buster Keaton: Go West is the sixth album by Bill Frisell to be released on the Elektra Nonesuch label. It was released in 1995 and features performances by Frisell, bassist Kermit Driscoll and drummer Joey Baron. The album is designed as accompaniment to the Buster Keaton's silent film classic, Go West (1925), and was released at the same time as another album of Keaton soundtracks by Frisell, The High Sign/One Week (1995).

== Reception ==
The AllMusic review by JT Griffith stated:

Go West is a Buster Keaton classic often compared to the Charlie Chaplin classics. The story follows a down-and-out Midwesterner following Horace Greeley's adage "Go West, young man!" Classic hilarity in this film includes a milking scene and a card game. (Roscoe "Fatty" Arbuckle makes an in-drag cameo.) The original soundtrack recording also includes Kermit Driscoll on acoustic and electric basses and Joey Barron on percussion. Frisell and his band performed the music to all three films at St. Ann's in Brooklyn, NY, in May 1993. The warmly recorded albums are adventurous and evocative. Critics described Bill Frisell's inspired episodic work with Keaton's films as "deceptively modest" and "melancholy Americana. These rich narrative accompaniments are essential for students of cinema music and evangelists of the power of the score to enrich and enlighten visual art."

Professional ratings
Review scores
Source	Rating
AllMusic	4/5 stars
The Penguin Guide to Jazz Recordings	3/4 stars

== Track listing ==
All compositions by Bill Frisell.

1. "Down on Luck" – 4:11
2. "Box Car" – 0:57
3. "Busy Street Scene" – 0:44
4. "Go West" – 1:00
5. "Train" – 3:06
6. "Brown Eyes" – 4:21
7. "Saddle Up!" – 2:41
8. "First Aid" – 0:51
9. "Bullfight" – 2:25
10. "Wolves" – 3:14
11. "New Day" – 5:27
12. "Branded" – 1:20
13. "Eats" – 1:13
14. "Splinter Scene" – 2:33
15. "Cattle Drive" – 4:36
16. "Card Game" – 5:03
17. "Ambush" – 4:02
18. "Passing Through Pasadena" – 1:52
19. "To The Streets" – 3:11
20. "Tap Dancer and Confusion" – 6:42
21. "Devil Suit" – 2:08
22. "Cops and Fireman" – 3:58
23. "That a Boy" – 1:31
24. "I Want Her" – 2:13

== Personnel ==
- Bill Frisell – acoustic and electric guitars
- Kermit Driscoll – acoustic and electric basses
- Joey Baron – drums and percussion
