= Stone Raiders =

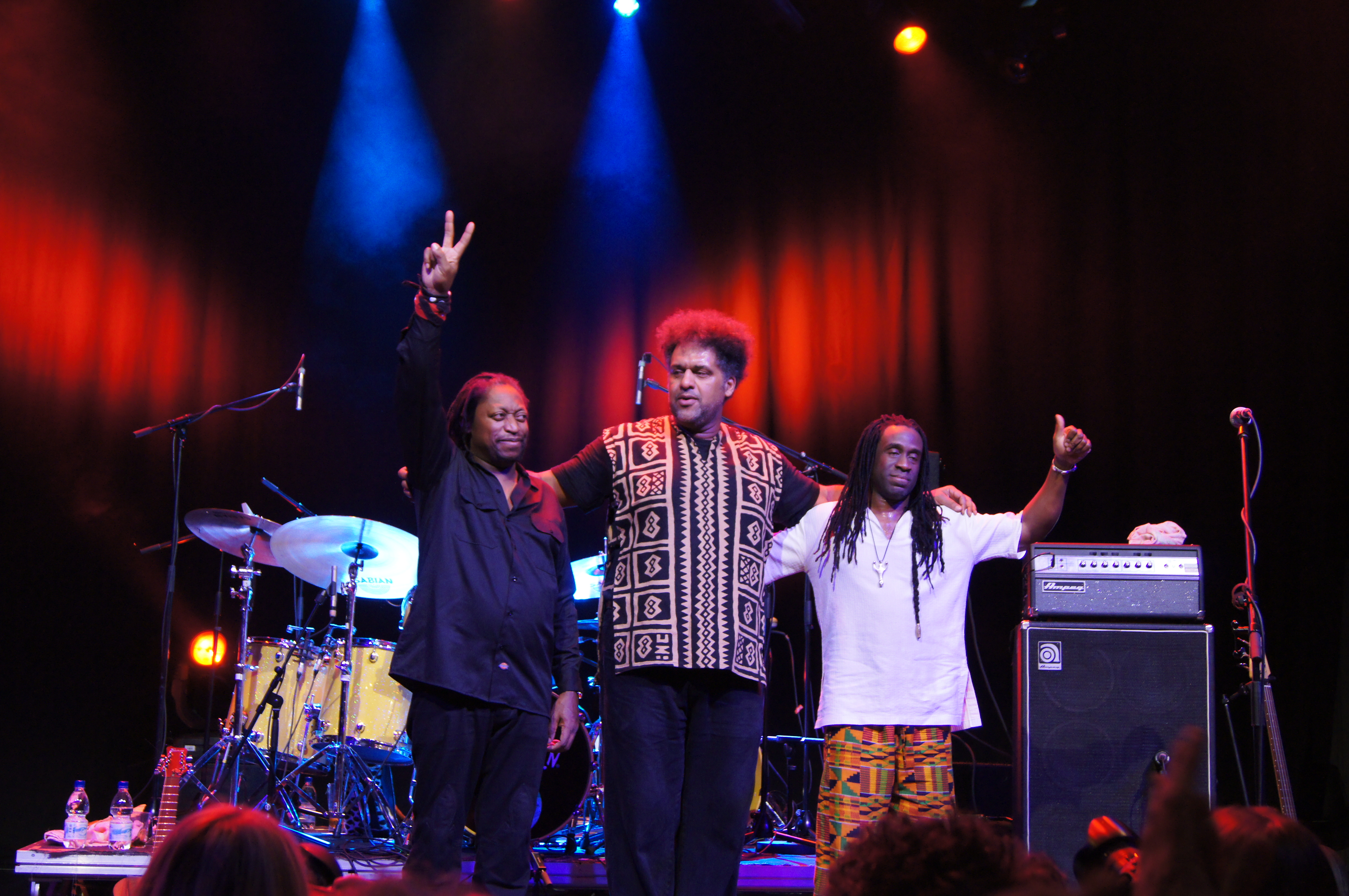
- Stone Raiders perform live in Kino Šiška, Ljubljana, Slovenia on 2 February 2012.

Background information
- Origin: United States
- Genres: Blues rock; funk
- Label: Yellowbird records
- Members: Jean-Paul Bourelly; Darryl Jones; Will Calhoun
- Website: www.facebook.com/stoneraiders

Stone Raiders also known as Black Stone Raiders is an American blues rock and funk band.

Stone Raiders members are Jean-Paul Bourelly, a Chicago born jazz fusion and blues rock guitarist, Darryl Jones, also a Chicago born jazz and rock bass guitarist who also plays with The Rolling Stones, and Will Calhoun, an American drummer and a member of the group Living Colour.
