= Kermit Driscoll =

American jazz musician

James "Kermit" Driscoll (born March 4, 1956) is an American jazz bassist. He is known for his long association with guitarist Bill Frisell in the 1980s and '90s. Driscoll has worked in many genres and music settings: Broadway, classical, jazz, folk, rock, film, and television. He has taught at SUNY Purchase College and Sarah Lawrence College.

== Biography ==
Driscoll was born in Kearney, Nebraska. He began playing piano at age five. Soon after, he added saxophone, and at age thirteen he picked up the bass guitar. He was soon was playing gigs around the midwest. When an offer to travel with a rock band came up, he dropped out of high school at age sixteen to go on tour.

He later attended the University of Miami, where one of his teachers was Jaco Pastorius. At Berklee College of Music in 1975 he became friends with guitarist Bill Frisell, and they often performed locally in Boston. Driscoll cites Pastorius and Frisell as two of the biggest influences on his life. Around 1976, he and his roommate, drummer Vinnie Colaiuta, and Frisell found work in a band called the Boston Connection. According to Frisell, band members dressed in orange polyester suits and played disco.

In May 1978, Driscoll traveled to Belgium to play with Stephan Houben who was working with Frisell. With this group he made his first recording, Mauve Traffic, with Frisell, Houben, Greg Badolato, Vinton Johnson, and Michel Herr. The album included a composition by Driscoll entitled "Doggone it". In January, 1980, he moved to New York City, and during the next year toured with Buddy Rich.

From 1986 to 1996, he was a member of Bill Frisell's quartet. From 1990 to 1995, he was in the group New and Used with trumpeter Dave Douglas and saxophonist Andy Laster.

In 2005, he was diagnosed with advanced Lyme disease. Friends performed benefit concerts. Colauita helped gather donations and encouraged Driscoll to record. Reveille, his first album as a leader, was recorded with Colaiuta, Frisell, and pianist Kris Davis and released in 2010.

On January, 28th, 2019 Driscoll was accused of beating his wife and charged with aggravated assault, violating a restraining order, false imprisonment, hindering his arrest, obstruction and harassment. This was after being removed from a Cliffside Park, NJ home by the Bergen County Regional SWAT Team.

== Discography ==
=== As leader ===
- 2010 Reveille (19/8 Records)
- 2012 Window & Door (Supraphon)

With New and Used

- 1992 Souvenir (Knitting Factory)
- 1995 Consensus (Knitting Factory)

=== As sideman ===
With Bill Frisell

- 1987 Lookout for Hope (ECM)
- 1989 Before We Were Born (Nonesuch)
- 1991 Where in the World? (Nonesuch)
- 1992 Have a Little Faith (Nonesuch)
- 1994 This Land (Nonesuch)
- 1995 Go West: Music for the Films of Buster Keaton (Nonesuch)
- 1995 The High Sign/One Week (Nonesuch)
- 1995 Live (Gramavision)

With John Hollenbeck

- 2005 A Blessing
- 2009 Eternal Interlude (Sunnyside)

With Joel Harrison

- 2013 Infinite Possibility
- 2015 Spirit House

With Gerry Hemingway

- 2002 Songs
- 2005 Double Blues Crossing (Between the Lines)

With David Johansen

- 2000 David Johansen and the Harry Smiths
- 2002 Shaker

With Mick Rossi

- 1997 Inside the Sphere
- 1999 They Have a Word for Everything

With John Zorn

- 1997 FilmWorks III: 1990–1995
- 1997 FilmWorks VII: Cynical Hysterie Hour

With others

- 1989 Those Who Know History Are Doomed to Repeat It, Henry Kaiser
- 1991 Miracle Mile, Wayne Horvitz
- 1991 Overlays, Ned Rothenberg
- 1998 Jazz Standards on Mars, Robert Dick
- 2000 Dancing Spirits, Karl Latham
- 2000 Hangdog Heaven, Jim Lord
- 2002 Almost Blue, Chet Baker
- 2002 Lalo, Lalo
- 2003 Do You Speak Vibe, Bill Molenhof
- 2004 Light Is Calling, Michael Gordon
- 2004 Save Big, Russ Johnson
- 2005 New York School, Tom Christensen
- 2005 Nu Love, Johannes Mossinger
- 2005 Oceana, Ben Monder (Sunnyside)
- 2006 Beginning to See the Light, Jane Stuart
- 2006 Velvet Gentlemen, Dan Willis
- 2006 Walkin' with the Wazmo, Jerry Vivino
- 2006 You Decide, Rave Tesar
- 2007 Resonance, Karl Latham
- 2007 The Path to Peace, Andrew Sterman
- 2008 A Day in the Life of a Mother and Wife, Cat Guthrie
- 2008 A Quiet Thing, Lisa Sokolov
- 2008 The Exile of St. Christopher, Max Gabriel
- 2009 The Funky Way of Emil Viklicky, Emil Viklicky
- 2010 The Satie Project, Dan Willis
