= The High Sign/One Week =

The High Sign/One Week: Music for the Films of Buster Keaton

Studio album by Bill Frisell
- Released: 1995
- Recorded: 1995
- Studio: Möbius Music, San Francisco
- Genre: Downtown music, film soundtrack
- Length: 36:59
- Label: Elektra Nonesuch
- Producer: Lee Townsend

Bill Frisell chronology
| Go West: Music for the Films of Buster Keaton (1995) | The High Sign/One Week: Music for the Films of Buster Keaton (1995) | Live (1995) |

The High Sign/One Week: Music for the Films of Buster Keaton is an album by the guitarist Bill Frisell, released on the Elektra Nonesuch label. It was released in 1995 and features performances by Frisell, bassist Kermit Driscoll and drummer Joey Baron. The album is designed as accompaniment to Buster Keaton's first two silent film classics, The High Sign (1921) (tracks 1–9) and One Week (1920) (tracks 10–19). It was released at the same time as another album by Frisell of Keaton soundtracks, Go West: Music for the Films of Buster Keaton (1995).

== Reception ==
The AllMusic review by JT Griffith stated: "These rich narrative accompaniments are essential for students of film music and evangelists of the power of the score to enrich and enlighten visual art.".

Professional ratings
Review scores
| Source | Rating |
|---|---|
| AllMusic | 4/5 stars |
| The Penguin Guide to Jazz Recordings | 3/4 stars |

== Track listing ==
All compositions by Bill Frisell.

1. "Introduction" – 0:37
2. "The High Sign Theme/Help Wanted" – 0:42
3. "Target Practice" – 1:16
4. "The Blinking Buzzards" – 1:06
5. "Good Shot/Swearing In/Shooting Gallery" – 2:30
6. "Chase/Cop" (5:43)
7. "The High Sign Theme/At The Home Of August Nickelnurser" – 1:10
8. "Chase/Caught" – 3:21
9. "The High Sign Theme" – 1:56
10. "One Week Theme/The Wedding" – 0:27
11. "Reckless Driving" – 1:39
12. "Construction" – 0:49
13. "Oh, Well/The Piano" – 1:42
14. "Fight" – 5:12
15. "Oh, Well/Bath Scene" – 2:05
16. "Housewarming Party and Storm" – 2:52
17. "One Week Theme/Aftermath" – 2:19
18. "Here Comes The Train" – 0:44
19. "Oh, Well" – 0:49

== Personnel ==
- Bill Frisell – acoustic and electric guitars
- Kermit Driscoll – acoustic and electric basses
- Joey Baron – drums and percussion
