= Nu Blaxploitation =

Studio album by Don Byron
- Released: 1998
- Genres: Funk, jazz, hip hop
- Label: Blue Note
- Producer: Don Byron

Don Byron chronology
Bug Music (1996)	Nu Blaxploitation (1998)	Romance with the Unseen (1999)

Nu Blaxploitation is an album by the American musician Don Byron, released in 1998. He is credited with his band, Existential Dred. Byron supported the album with a North American tour.

== Production ==
The album was recorded in December 1997 and January 1998. The poet Sadiq Bey performed on many of the tracks. Biz Markie contributed rap verses to "Schizo Man". Reggie Washington played bass; Uri Caine played piano. "Blinky" is about the abuse of Abner Louima by the NYPD. "If 6 Was 9" is a cover of the Jimi Hendrix song; it contains a passage from the Turtles' "Happy Together". Byron covered a couple of Mandrill songs; the band was one of Byron's childhood favorites. "Dodi" references Dodi Fayed, while "Furman" refers to racist LAPD cop Mark Fuhrman, known from the trial of OJ Simpson. "Domino Theories" was inspired by the work of political scientist Andrew Hacker.

== Critical reception ==
Professional ratings
Review scores
Source	Rating
AllMusic	4/5 stars
Robert Christgau	(dud)
The Encyclopedia of Popular Music	4/5 stars
Los Angeles Daily News	1/4 stars
The Penguin Guide to Jazz on CD	3/4 stars

Time called the album "overtly political funk and rap" full of "dark, fertile electric grooves." The Chicago Reader deemed it "an incisive collection of loose-limbed funk, acerbic spoken word." Stereo Review considered Nu Blaxploitation "a mix of old-school groove, social protest, and surrealistic asides—just the kind of ambitious sprawl you'd expect from someone who dedicates his album to both Latin/funk purveyors Mandrill and classical composer Arnold Schoenberg (among others)."

Jazziz wrote that the album "unfolds like a series of existential concerns set to a backbeat—a churlish, unapologetic bit of brilliance that vamps, grooves, strolls, and riffs on several levels at once." Newsday labeled it "a one-of-a-kind testimony on what it's like to be a caring, daring African-American intellectual-bohemian at the tail end of the 20th Century." The Washington Post stated that "Byron has writer Sadiq tiresomely spell out his points with words that recall the sophomoric scribblings of punk poet Henry Rollins."

AllMusic praised the "somber, chamber jazz arrangements and a bevy of funky, swinging charts."

== Track listing ==
No.	Title	Length
1.	"Alien"
2.	"Domino Theories – Part I"
3.	"Blinky"
4.	"Mango Meat"
5.	"Interview"
6.	"Schizo Man"
7.	"Dodi"
8.	"I'm Stuck"
9.	"I Cannot Commit"
10.	"Fencewalk"
11.	"Hagalo"
12.	"Domino Theories – Part II"
13.	"If 6 Was 9"
14.	"Furman"
