= This Land (Bill Frisell album) =

Studio album by Bill Frisell
- Released: 1994
- Recorded: October 1992
- Studio: Mastersound Astoria, New York
- Genre: Jazz; Post-bop; Americana
- Length: 65:28
- Label: Elektra Nonesuch
- Producer: Lee Townsend

Bill Frisell chronology
Have a Little Faith (1992)	This Land (1994)	Go West: Music for the Films of Buster Keaton (1995)

This Land is the fifth album by Bill Frisell to be released on the Elektra Nonesuch label. It was released in 1994 and features performances by Frisell, alto saxophonist Billy Drewes, trombonist Curtis Fowlkes, clarinetist Don Byron, bassist Kermit Driscoll and drummer Joey Baron.

== Reception ==
The AllMusic review by Glenn Astarita stated, "The guitarist's now familiar penchant for constructing climactic opuses framed upon his deft utilization of volume control and often-slithery mode of attack counterbalances the horn sections' pumping notes and harmonious choruses. Essentially, melody is the key throughout these pleasantly arranged pieces, as Frisell makes his axe talk and cry while also partaking in lustrous unison lines with Don Byron (clarinet), Curtis Fowlkes (trombone), and Billy Drewes (alto sax). Overall, This Land signifies yet another powerful statement by this wonderfully inventive musician. Recommended!".

Professional ratings
Review scores
Source	Rating
AllMusic	4/5 stars
The Penguin Guide to Jazz Recordings	3.5/4 stars

== Track listing ==
All compositions by Bill Frisell except as indicated.

1. "Is it Sweet?" – 5:05
2. "Strange Meeting" – 6:18
3. "Jimmy Carter" (Part 1) – 2:03
4. "Jimmy Carter" (Part 2) – 5:22
5. "This Land" – 3:15
6. "Dog Eat Dog" – 4:17
7. "Amarillo Barbados" – 4:13
8. "Monica Jane" – 4:59
9. "Resistor" – 6:56
10. "Julius Hemphill" – 9:53
11. "Unscientific Americans" – 0:46
12. "Cartoon" – 6:22
13. "Rag" – 4:18
14. "Tag" (Frisell, Baron) – 1:45

== Personnel ==
- Bill Frisell – guitar
- Don Byron – clarinet and bass clarinet
- Billy Drewes – alto saxophone
- Curtis Fowlkes – trombone
- Kermit Driscoll – electric and acoustic basses
- Joey Baron – drums
