= Don Byron Plays the Music of Mickey Katz =

Studio album by Don Byron
- Released: 1993
- Recorded: September 1992
- Studios: Master Sound, Astoria, NY
- Genre: Jazz
- Length: 53:12
- Label: Nonesuch 7559-79313
- Producer: Hans Wendl

Don Byron chronology
| Tuskegee Experiments (1992) | Don Byron Plays the Music of Mickey Katz (1993) | Music for Six Musicians (1995) |

Don Byron Plays the Music of Mickey Katz is an album by clarinetist Don Byron featuring music associated with comedian and musician Mickey Katz which was released on the Nonesuch label in 1993.

== Reception ==
Professional ratings
Review scores
| Source | Rating |
|---|---|
| AllMusic | 4/5 stars |

The AllMusic review by Bob Tarte stated, "Playing Katz's songs demands prodigious chops, hence the attraction of Katz to molecule-splitting clarinetist Don Byron, who demonstrates nerve presenting Katz the monologist as the equal of Katz the composer. In sum, convoluted, kaleidoscopic silliness topped with Byron's usual dazzling self".

"I was staggered, bewildered, touched and moved," was the reaction of actor-director Joel Grey, the son of Mickey Katz. "It was like my father, who died . . . years ago, was inside of him."

== Track listing ==
All compositions by Mickey Katz except where noted

1. "Prologue: ...Shed No Tears Before the Rain" (Don Byron) – 4:08
2. "Frailach Jamboree" – 2:34
3. "Haim Afen Range" (Traditional) – 2:49
4. "Mamaliege Dance" (Nat Farber, Mickey Katz) – 2:23
5. "Sweet and Gentle" (Monterrey Portal, George Thorn) – 3:02
6. "Litvak Square Dance" – 2:08
7. "C'est Si Bon" (Henri Betti, André Hornez, Jerry Seelen) – 2:27
8. "Trombonik Tanz" (Farber, Katz) – 3:14
9. "Bar Mitzvah Special" (Farber, Louis Singer) – 3:02
10. "Dreidel Song" (Traditional) – 4:48
11. "Seder Dance" – 2:12
12. "Paisach in Portugal" (Raul Ferrão, Jimmy Kennedy) – 3:08
13. "Berele's Sherele" (Farber, Benny Gill) – 1:48
14. "Mechaye War Chant" (Katz, John Noble, Ralph Freed) – 2:50
15. "Kiss of Meyer" (Lester Allen, Robert Hill) – 2:20
16. "Epilogue: Tears" (Byron) – 7:12
17. "Wedding Dance" – 2:26

== Personnel ==
- Don Byron – clarinet, vocals, conductor
- J. D. Parran – clarinet, bass clarinet, soprano saxophone, flute
- Mark Feldman – violin, background vocals
- Dave Douglas – trumpet, background vocals
- Josh Roseman – trombone, horse lips, boat whistle, background vocals
- Uri Caine – piano, background vocals
- Steve Alcott – bass
- Richie Schwarz – drums. percussion, xylophone
- Lorin Sklamberg – lead vocals (tracks 5–8, 10–12 & 15)
- Avi Hoffman – lead vocals (tracks 3 & 14), background vocals
- Brandon Ross – guitars (tracks 1 & 3)
- Jerry González – Latin percussion (track 5)
- Dan Hovey – Hawaiian guitar, guitar (tracks 14 & 16)
- Jay Berliner – mandolin (track 12)
- Loretta Malta – background vocals (track 12)
- Rosalie Gerut – additional vocals
