= Circuit Rider (album) =

Studio album by Ron Miles
- Released: October 31, 2014
- Recorded: October 29 & 30, 2013
- Studio: Mighty Fine Productions, Denver, CO
- Genre: Jazz
- Length: 56:39
- Label: Yellowbird yeb-7745
- Producer: Hans Wendl

Ron Miles chronology
Quiver (2012)	Circuit Rider (2014)	I Am a Man (2017)

Circuit Rider is an album by cornetist/composer Ron Miles with guitarist Bill Frisell and drummer Brian Blade which was released on the Yellowbird label in 2014.

== Reception ==
Professional ratings
Review scores
Source	Rating
The Absolute Sound	4.5/5 stars

The Absolute Sound's Bill Milkowski observed "For 20 years inventive trumpeter-cornetist Ron Miles has had a special musical relationship with guitarist Bill Frisell, and this trio outing unites them with drummer Brian Blade. ... Miles and Frisell demonstrate a rare musical telepathy".

In JazzTimes Britt Robson wrote "Frisell sidles into projects led by his longtime friend and cohort, cornetist-trumpeter Ron Miles. Circuit Rider continues the lineage of their duet disc, Heaven, from 2002, and Quiver a decade later, which inaugurated their current trio by adding Brian Blade on drums. All three albums feature songs that are as firm, earthy and countrified as heirloom tomatoes ... the trio’s maturation on this outing is perhaps most due to the enhanced influence of Blade ... the drummer-composer had long demonstrated his affinity for the distinctive way Miles and Frisell approached Americana jazz. But the familiarity he gleaned during the Quiver sessions pays off with a fuller membership in the proceedings here".

== Track listing ==
All compositions by Ron Miles except where noted

1. "Comma" – 9:07
2. "Jive Five Floor Four" (Charles Mingus) – 6:55
3. "The Flesh is Weak" – 5:00
4. "Dancing Close and Slow" – 8:50
5. "Circuit Rider" – 4:55
6. "Reincarnation of a Lovebird" (Mingus) – 7:07
7. "Angelina" – 5:04
8. "Two Kinds of Blues" (Jimmy Giuffre) – 9:41

== Personnel ==
- Ron Miles – cornet
- Bill Frisell – guitar
- Brian Blade – drums
