= Have a Little Faith (Bill Frisell album) =

Studio album by Bill Frisell
- Released: 1992
- Recorded: March 1992
- Studio: RPM Studios NYC
- Genre: Jazz, Americana
- Length: 60:46
- Label: Elektra Nonesuch
- Producer: Wayne Horvitz

Bill Frisell chronology
Where in the World? (1991)	Have a Little Faith (1992)	This Land (1993)

Have a Little Faith is a 1992 album by American guitarist Bill Frisell, his seventh album overall and fourth for Elektra Nonesuch. Musicians include Frisell, clarinetist Don Byron, bassist Kermit Driscoll, accordion player Guy Klucevsek and drummer Joey Baron. The album covers a range of American classical and popular music. The album was widely acclaimed as one of Frisell's best and as an outstanding jazz album of the 1990s.

== Reception ==
Professional ratings
Review scores
Source	Rating
AllMusic	5/5 stars
The Penguin Guide to Jazz	4/4 stars
Select	2/5 medals

The Penguin Guide to Jazz selected this album for its "Core Collection" calling it a "marvelous examination of Americana'".

An AllMusic review by Scott Yanow stated, "This is one of the most inventive recordings of the 1990s and should delight most listeners from any genre".

== Track listing ==
1. "The Open Prairie": from Billy the Kid (Copland) – 3:11
2. "Street Scene in a Frontier Town": from Billy the Kid (Copland) – 1:45
3. "Mexican Dance and Finale": from Billy the Kid (Copland) – 3:44
4. "Prairie Night (Card Game at Night)/Gun Battle": from Billy the Kid (Copland) – 5:02
5. "Celebration After Billy's Capture": from Billy the Kid (Copland) – 2:17
6. "Billy in Prison": from Billy the Kid (Copland) – 1:33
7. "The Open Prairie Again": from Billy the Kid (Copland) – 2:34
8. "The Saint-Gaudens in Boston Common": Excerpt 1 (Ives) – 0:41
9. "Just Like a Woman" (Dylan) – 4:49
10. "I Can't Be Satisfied" (Morganfield) (3:00)
11. "Live to Tell" (Leonard, Madonna) – 10:10
12. "The Saint-Gaudens in Boston Common": Excerpt 2 (Ives) – 3:05
13. "No Moe" (Rollins) – 2:37
14. "Washington Post March" (Sousa) – 2:05
15. "When I Fall in Love" (Heyman, Young) – 3:26
16. "Little Jenny Dow" (Foster) – 3:30
17. "Have a Little Faith in Me" (Hiatt) – 5:39
18. "Billy Boy" (Traditional) – 1:38

== Personnel ==
- Bill Frisell – guitar
- Don Byron – clarinet, bass clarinet
- Guy Klucevsek – accordion
- Kermit Driscoll – bass
- Joey Baron – drums
