= Black Bone =

Studio album by Craig Harris
- Released: 1983
- Recorded: January 4, 12 & 13, 1983
- Genre: Jazz
- Length: 39:14
- Label: Soul Note
- Producer: Giovanni Bonandrini

Craig Harris chronology
Aboriginal Affairs (1983)	Black Bone (1983)	Tributes (1985)

Black Bone is an album by American jazz trombonist and composer Craig Harris recorded in 1983 and released on the Italian Soul Note label.

== Reception ==
The Allmusic review by Ron Wynn awarded the album 4 stars calling it an "Outstanding session" of "rousing, spirited originals".

Professional ratings
Review scores
Source	Rating
Allmusic	4/5 stars
The Penguin Guide to Jazz Recordings	3.5/4 stars

== Track listing ==
All compositions by Craig Harris

1. "Homeland" - 7:10
2. "Blackwell" - 13:02
3. "Song for Psychedelic Souls" - 8:06
4. "September 10, 1953" - 3:58
5. "Conjure Man" - 6:58
- Recorded at Greene Street Recording Studio in New York City on January 4, 12 & 13, 1983

== Personnel ==
- Craig Harris - trombone
- George Adams - tenor saxophone
- Donald Smith - piano
- Fred Hopkins - bass
- Charli Persip - drums
