= Craig Harris =

American jazz trombonist (born 1953)

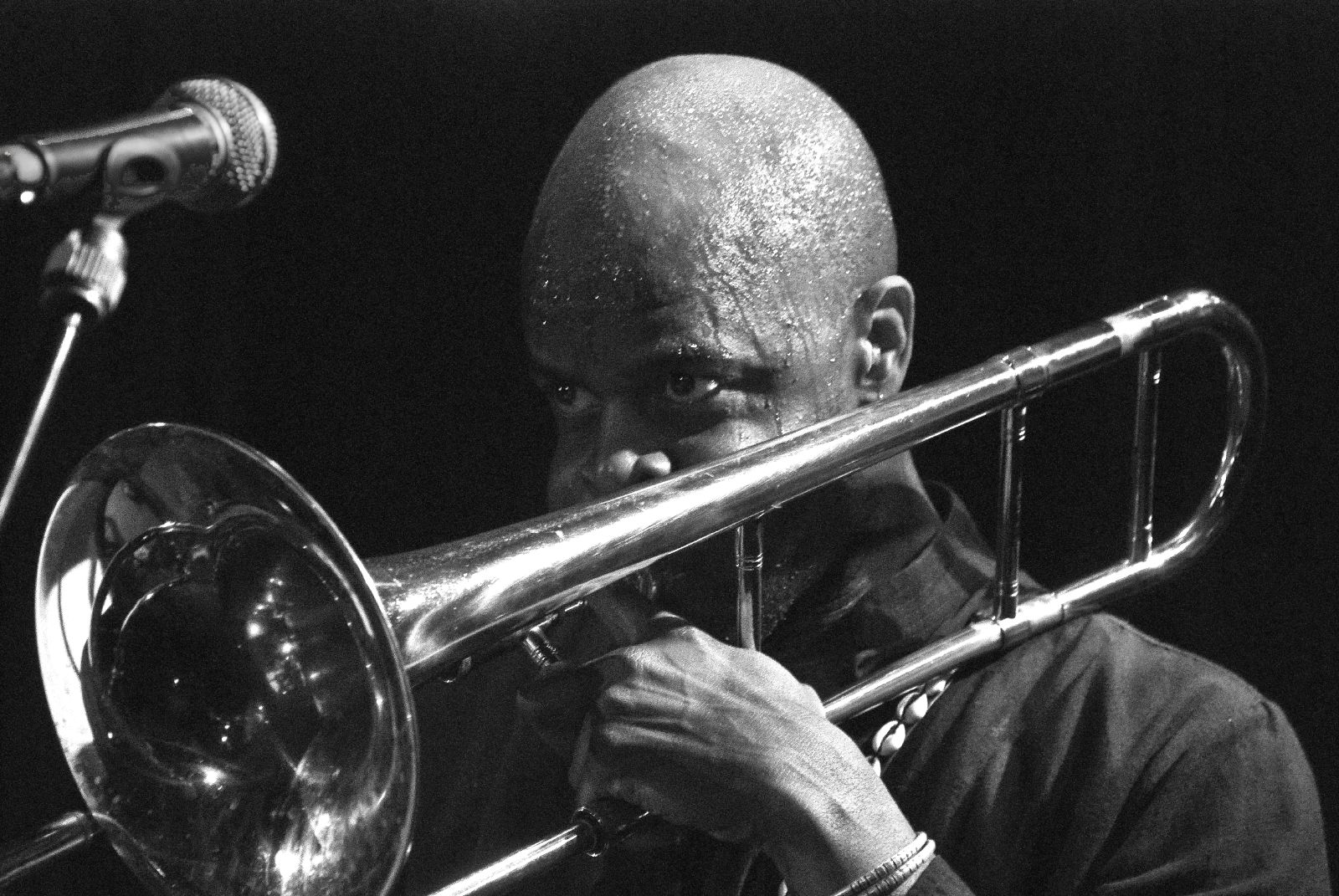
- Harris in 2007

Background information
- Born: Craig S. Harris; September 10, 1953 (age 72); Hempstead, New York, U.S.
- Genres: Jazz
- Occupation: Musician
- Instruments: Trombone, didgeridoo
- Years active: 1976–present
- Labels: India Navigation, Soul Note, JMT
- Website: craigsharris.com

Craig S. Harris (born September 10, 1953) is an American jazz trombonist, who started working with Sun Ra in 1976. He also has worked with Abdullah Ibrahim, David Murray, Lester Bowie, Cecil Taylor, Sam Rivers, Muhal Richard Abrams, Henry Threadgill, and Charlie Haden.

As leader, Harris has recorded since 1983 for India Navigation, Soul Note and JMT. For the latter, he recorded with two groups. The Tailgater's Tales was a quintet with clarinetist Don Byron, trumpeter Eddie Allen, Anthony Cox on double bass, and Pheeroan akLaff on drums. Harris's large ensemble Cold Sweat was a tribute to the music of James Brown.

== Background ==
Harris is a graduate of the music program of State University of New York at Old Westbury (SUNY at Old Westbury), and was influenced by its founder and director Makanda Ken McIntyre. Harris's move to New York City in 1978 established him with trombonists Ray Anderson, Joseph Bowie, and George E. Lewis.

Harris first played alongside another of his teachers at SUNY, baritone saxophonist Pat Patrick, in The Sun Ra Arkestra for two years. Harris than embarked on a world tour with South African pianist Abdullah Ibrahim (Dollar Brand) in 1979. While on tour in Australia, Harris discovered the indigenous Australian wind instrument the didgeridoo, which he added to the collection of instruments he plays.

Harris subsequently performed with major progressive musicians including David Murray, the Beaver Harris, Don Pullen, Rivers, Lester Bowie, and many others, and he also played in Lena Horne's Broadway orchestra for a year. Leading his own ensembles, Harris has performed internationally and recorded several albums.

Harris, along with Mark Isham composed the soundtrack for the 2021 film Judas and the Black Messiah.

== Discography ==
=== As leader ===
- Aboriginal Affairs (India Navigation, 1983)
- Black Bone (Soul Note, 1984)
- Tributes (OTC, 1985)
- Shelter (JMT, 1987)
- Blackout in the Square Root of Soul (JMT, 1988)
- Cold Sweat Plays J. B. (JMT, 1989)
- 4 Play (JMT, 1990)
- F-Stops (Soul Note, 1994)
- Istanbul (Doublemoon, 1998)
- Souls Within the Veil (Aquastra Music, 2005)

=== As sideman ===
With Muhal Richard Abrams

- Blues Forever (Black Saint, 1982)
- Rejoicing with the Light (Black Saint, 1983)
- Song for All (Black Saint, 1997)

With David Murray

- Murray's Steps (Black Saint, 1983)
- Live at Sweet Basil Volume 1 (Black Saint, 1985)
- Live at Sweet Basil Volume 2 (Black Saint, 1985)
- New Life (Black Saint, 1987)
- David Murray Big Band (DIW, 1991)
- Hope Scope (Black Saint, 1991)
- Picasso (DIW, 1993)
- South of the Border (DIW, 1995)
- Dark Star: The Music of the Grateful Dead (Astor Place, 1996)
- Fo Deuk Revue (Enja, 1997)
- Octet Plays Trane (Justin Time, 2000)
- Yonn-Dé (Justin Time, 2002)
- Now Is Another Time (Justin Time, 2003)
- Perfection with Geri Allen and Terri Lyne Carrington (Motema, 2016)
- Blues for Memo (Motema, 2018)

With Sun Ra

- Live at Montreux (Saturn Research, 1976)
- Cosmos (Cobra, 1976)
- Unity (Horo, 1978)
- Sleeping Beauty (El Saturn, 1979)
- Strange Celestial Road (Rounder, 1980)
- A Quiet Place in the Universe (Leo, 1994)

With others

- Ahmed Abdullah, Traveling the Spaceways (Planet Arts, 2004)
- Ayibobo, Freestyle (DIW, 1993)
- Billy Bang, Hip Hop Be Bop (ITM, 1993)
- Lester Bowie, I Only Have Eyes for You (ECM, 1985)
- Dollar Brand, African Marketplace (Elektra, 1980)
- Dollar Brand, At Montreux (Enja, 1980)
- Don Byron, Bug Music (Nonesuch, 1996)
- Carla Cook, Dem Bones (Maxjazz, 2001)
- Paulinho da Costa, Sunrise (Victor, 1984)
- Joseph Daley, The Seven Deadly Sins (Jaro, 2010)
- Lena Horne, Lena Horne: The Lady and Her Music (Qwest, 1981)
- Joseph Jarman, Earth Passage - Density (Black Saint, 1981)
- The Roots, The Roots Come Alive (MCA, 1999)
- Sekou Sundiata, LongStoryShort (Righteous Babe, 2000)
- Warren Smith, Dragon Dave Meets Prince Black Knight from the Darkside of the Moon (Porter, 2011)
- Henry Threadgill, When Was That? (About Time, 1982)
- Henry Threadgill, Just the Facts and Pass the Bucket (About Time, 1983)
- World Saxophone Quartet, Experience (Justin Time, 2004)
- World Saxophone Quartet, Political Blues (Justin Time, 2006)
