= Jungle Cowboy =

Studio album by Jean-Paul Bourelly
- Released: 1987
- Recorded: December 1986
- Studio: Sound Ideas, New York
- Genre: Jazz
- Length: 45:45
- Label: JMT; JMT 870 009
- Producer: Jean-Paul Bourelly, Stefan F. Winter

Jean-Paul Bourelly chronology
Jungle Cowboy (1987)	Trippin' (1992)

Jungle Cowboy is the debut album by guitarist Jean-Paul Bourelly which was recorded in late 1986 and released on the JMT label with distribution by Polygram.

== Reception ==
The AllMusic review by Brian Olewnick states "A couple of the tracks succeed marginally but, despite the occasional presence of outstanding musicians like Julius Hemphill and Andrew Cyrille, most of the songs remain leaden and slick, the musical equivalent of the glamour-style photos that adorn the album cover". Musician's reviewer in 1988 wrote about the album, "It's about rawness, and though it doesn't have an abundance of structural sophistication, Bourelly's debut is easily identifiable, i.e., he's got a vision.", Steve Holtje, in MusicHound's Jazz: The Essential Album Guide (1998), called Jungle Cowboy Bourelly's best album, and music critic Ben Watson called "Mother Earth" a sultry masterpiece.

Professional ratings
Review scores
Source	Rating
AllMusic	3.5/5 stars
Christgau's Record Guide	B+

== Track listing ==
All compositions by Jean-Paul Bourelly except where indicated

1. "Love Line" - 4:39
2. "Tryin' to Get Over" - 4:11
3. "Drifter" - 5:08
4. "Hope You Find Your Way" - 6:15
5. "Jungle Cowboy" - 3:18
6. "No Time to Share" - 3:34
7. "Can't Get Enough" - 5:17
8. "Parade" - 4:07
9. "Mother Earth" (Peter Chatman) – 4:46
10. "Groove With Me" - 4:30

== Personnel ==
- Jean-Paul Bourelly – lead guitar, vocals
- Julius Hemphill – alto saxophone
- Carl Bourelly – synthesizer, backing vocals
- Kelvyn Bell – rhythm guitar, backing vocals
- Freddie Cash – bass, backing vocals
- Kevin Johnson – drums, backing vocals
- Greg Carmouché – percussion, backing vocals
- Andrew Cyrille – drums (track 9)
- Alyson Williams – vocals (track 4)
