= Eddie Allen (jazz musician) =

American jazz musician (born 1957)

- Born: July 12, 1957 (age 68)
- Origin: Milwaukee, Wisconsin, U.S.
- Genres: Jazz
- Instruments: Trumpet, flugelhorn

Eddie Allen (born July 12, 1957) is an American jazz trumpeter and flugelhornist from Milwaukee.

== Career ==
Allen has worked with Muhal Richard Abrams, Lester Bowie, Art Blakey, Benny Carter, Chico Freeman, Craig Harris, and Dizzy Gillespie. He has used several variants of his name on CDs including E.J. Allen, Eddie E.J. Allen, and E.J. "Eddie" Allen. He also works in rhythm and blues and rock.

== Discography ==
=== As leader ===
- Another's Point of View (Enja, 1993)
- Remembrance (Venus, 1994)
- R 'n' B (Enja, 1995)
- Summer Days (Enja, 2000)
- Sãlongo (DBCD, 2007)
- Groove's Mood with The Aggregation (DBCD, 2008)
- Push (Edjalen Music, 2014)
- Jazzy Brass for the Holidays (2019)
- Rhythm People with PUSH (Origin Records, 2026)

=== As sideman ===
With Muhal Richard Abrams

- Think All, Focus One (Black Saint, 1995)
- One Line, Two Views (New World/CounterCurrents, 1995)
- Song for All (Black Saint, 1997)

With Lester Bowie

- Serious Fun (DIW, 1987)
- My Way (DIW, 1990)
- The Fire This Time (In+Out, 1992)

With Craig S. Harris

- Blackout in the Square Root of Soul (JMT, 1988)
- Cold Sweat Plays J. B. (JMT, 1989)
- 4 Play (JMT, 1991)

With Vanessa Rubin

- Soul Eyes (RCA Novus, 1992)
- Pastiche (RCA Novus 1993)
- The Dream Is You (NIbur, 2019)

With Mongo Santamaria

- Soy Yo (Concord Picante, 1987)
- Free Spirit (Club Rio, 1990)
- Brazilian Sunset (Candid, 1995)
- Mongo Returns! (Milestone, 1995)

With others

- Rabih Abou-Khalil, The Cactus of Knowledge (Enja, 2001)
- Art Ensemble of Chicago & Lester Bowie, Live at the 6th Tokyo Music Joy '90 (DIW, 1990)
- Nancie Banks, Waves of Peace (Consolidated Artists, 1992)
- Karen Bernod, Some Othaness for U (Natively Creative Music, 2000)
- Karen Bernod, Life at 360 Degrees (Dome, 2006)
- Cyrus Chestnut, Earth Stories (Atlantic, 1996)
- Joseph Daley, The Seven Deadly Sins (Jaro Medien, 2010)
- Teddy Edwards, Ladies Man (HighNote, 2001)
- Marty Ehrlich, The Long View (Enja, 2002)
- Marty Ehrlich, A Trumpet in the Morning (New World, 2013)
- Chico Freeman, You'll Know When You Get There (Black Saint, 1989)
- Josh Groban, Bridges (Reprise, 2018)
- Peter Hand, Out of Hand (Savant, 2014)
- Jerome Harris, Hidden in Plain View (New World, 1995)
- Louis Hayes, Nightfall (SteepleChase, 1991)
- Louis Hayes, Blue Lou (SteepleChase, 1994)
- Etta Jones, At Last (Muse, 1995)
- M'Boom, Collage (Soul Note, 1984)
- Natalie Merchant, Leave Your Sleep (Nonesuch, 2010)
- Natalie Merchant, Natalie Merchant (Nonesuch, 2014)
- Musiq Soulchild, Musiqinthemagiq (Atlantic, 2011)
- Houston Person, Thinking of You (HighNote, 2007)
- Houston Person, I'm Just a Lucky So and So (HighNote, 2019)
- Bobby Previte, Hue and Cry (Enja, 1994)
- Charli Persip, In Case You Missed It (Soul Note, 1985)
- Hal Singer, Senior Blues (Carrere, 1991)
