= F-Stops =

Studio album by Craig Harris
- Released: 1993
- Recorded: June 24 & 25, 1993
- Genre: Jazz
- Length: 77:25
- Label: Soul Note
- Producer: Craig Harris

Craig Harris chronology
4 Play (1990)	F-Stops (1993)	Istanbul (2003)

F-Stops is an album by American jazz trombonist and composer Craig Harris recorded in 1993 and released on the Italian Soul Note label.

== Reception ==
The Allmusic review by Scott Yanow awarded the album 4½ stars stating "Harris takes some of his finest recorded solos ever throughout this project, making it obvious that he is a major trombonist".

Professional ratings
Review scores
Source	Rating
Allmusic	4.5/5 stars
The Penguin Guide to Jazz Recordings	3.5/4 stars

== Track listing ==
All compositions by Craig Harris

1. "Say Essay" – 14:32
2. "F-Stops: 1st Flow" – 5:40
3. "F-Stops: 2nd Flow" – 3:12
4. "F-Stops: 3rd Flow" – 7:08
5. "F-Stops: 4th Flow" – 4:14
6. "F-Stops: 5th Flow" – 6:02
7. "F-Stops: 6th Flow" – 1:06
8. "F-Stops: 7th Flow" – 2:56
9. "D.A.S.H." – 5:46
10. "Generations" – 5:32
11. "High Life" – 9:28
12. "A Soft Shoe" – 3:32
13. "Burundi" – 8:17
  - Recorded at Sear Sound in New York City on June 24 & 25, 1993

== Personnel ==
- Craig Harris – trombone, didgeridoo, vocals
- John Stubblefield – tenor saxophone
- Hamiet Bluiett – baritone saxophone
- Darrell Grant – piano, keyboards
- Bill White – guitar
- Calvin X Jones – double bass
- Tony Lewis – drums
