= Hans Wendl =

German record producer

Hans Wendl is a producer. He began his career in the music business with the record label ECM Records in his hometown of Munich in the mid-1970s and was associated with the German label for twelve years before moving to the United States in 1986. He was also director of the Gramavision Records label for Rykodisc for three years during the mid-1990s.

Hans Wendl has produced the recordings of many notable jazz and world music artists, including Don Byron, Charlie Haden, Bill Frisell, Ravi Shankar, Anoushka Shankar, Peter Apfelbaum, Medeski Martin & Wood, and Tin Hat (formerly Tin Hat Trio). Of the over 30 recordings he has produced, five have been nominated for Grammy Awards, and in 2002, Ravi Shankar's Full Circle – Carnegie Hall 2000 won the Grammy for Best World Music Album.

Hans Wendl is based in Berkeley, California.

== Discography ==
- Allison Miller's Boom Tic Boom Otis Was a Polar Bear (Royal Potato Family, 2016)
- John Schott Actual Trio Actual Trio (Tzadik, 2015)
- Myra Melford Snowy Egret (Enja/Yellowbird 2015)
- Ron Miles with Bill Frisell and Brian Blade Circuit Rider (Enja/Yellowbird 2014)
- Ron Miles with Bill Frisell and Brian Blade Quiver (Enja/Yellowbird 2012)
- Don Byron New Gospel Quintet Love, Peace, and Soul (Savoy Jazz, 2012)
- Don Byron Do the Boomerang: The Music of Junior Walker (Blue Note, 2006)
- Todd Sickafoose Blood Orange (Secret Hatch, 2006)
- Peter Apfelbaum & the NY Hieroglyphics It Is Written (ACT, 2005)
- Beth Custer My Grandmother Soundtrack (BC Records, 2005)
- Don Byron Ivey-Divey (Blue Note, September 2004)
- Tin Hat Trio Book of Silk (Ropeadope, August 2004)
- Faun Fables/Dawn McCarthy Early Song (Drag City, July 2004)
- Tin Hat Trio The Rodeo Eroded (Ropeadope, 2002)
- Don Byron You Are #6 (Blue Note, 2001)
- Anoushka Shankar Live at Carnegie Hall (EMI/Angel, 2001)
- Ravi Shankar Full Circle: Carnegie Hall 2000 (EMI/Angel, 2001) ψψ
- Don Byron A Fine Line: Arias and Lieder (Blue Note, 2000)
- Tin Hat Trio Helium (EMI/Angel, 2000)
- Don Byron Romance with the Unseen (Blue Note, 1999)
- Vinicius Cantuária Tucuma (Verve Records, 1999)
- Tin Hat Trio Memory Is an Elephant (EMI/Angel, 1999)
- Ron Miles Woman’s Day (Gramavision Records, 1997)
- Peter Apfelbaum Luminous Charms (Gramavision Records, 1996)
- Ron Miles My Cruel Heart (Gramavision Records, 1996)
- Bill Frisell/Kermit Driscoll/Joey Baron Live (Gramavision, 1995)
- Don Byron Music for Six Musicians (Nonesuch Records, 1995)
- Charlie Haden Quartet West Always Say Goodbye (Verve Records, 1994)
- Don Byron Don Byron Plays the Music of Mickey Katz (Nonesuch Records, 1993)
- Kamikaze Ground Crew Madam Marie’s Temple of Knowledge (New World, 1993)
- Charlie Haden Quartet West Haunted Heart (Verve, 1992)
- Peter Apfelbaum & The Hieroglyphics Ensemble Jodoji Brightness (Antilles, 1992)
- New York Composers Orchestra First Program in Standard Time (New World, 1992)
- Music of Norway (Various Artists) Nordisk Sang (New Albion Records, 1991)
- Charlie Haden & The Liberation Music Orchestra Dream Keeper (Verve, 1991)
- Peter Apfelbaum & The Hieroglyphics Ensemble Signs of Life (Antilles, 1991)
- Charlie Haden Quartet West In Angel City (Verve, 1988)
- Charlie Haden Quartet West (Verve Records, 1987)
- The Everyman Band Without Warning (ECM, 1984)
- Gary Burton Quartet Picture This (ECM, 1982)
- [As Rykodisc/Gramavision Label Director and Executive Producer (1995–97)]:
- Vinicius Cantuária "Sol Na Cara"
- Arto Lindsay Remixes "Hyper Civilizado"
- Medeski Martin and Wood "Shack-man"
- Medeski Martin and Wood "Bubblehouse" (Remixes)
- Ron Miles "Woman’s Day"
- Ron Miles "My Cruel Heart"
- Clusone Trio "Love. Henry"
- Clusone Trio "I Am An Indian"
- Myra Melford "The Same River, Twice"
- Peter Apfelbaum "Luminous Charms"
- Oranj Symphonette Plays Mancini
- Bill Frisell/Kermit Driscoll/Joey Baron "Live"
- FILM SOUNDTRACKS:
- White: A Memoir in Color (2012) Music by Don Byron. Directed by Joel Katz.
- My Grandmother (BC Records, 2004) Music by Beth Custer. Directed by Kote Mikaberidze.
- Strange Fruit (PBS, 2002) Music by Don Byron. Directed by Joel Katz.
- Walk Don’t Walk (ZDF/Arte TV, Germany/France, 2001) Music by Don Byron. Directed by Thomas Struck
