= Don Byron =

American composer and musician (born 1958)

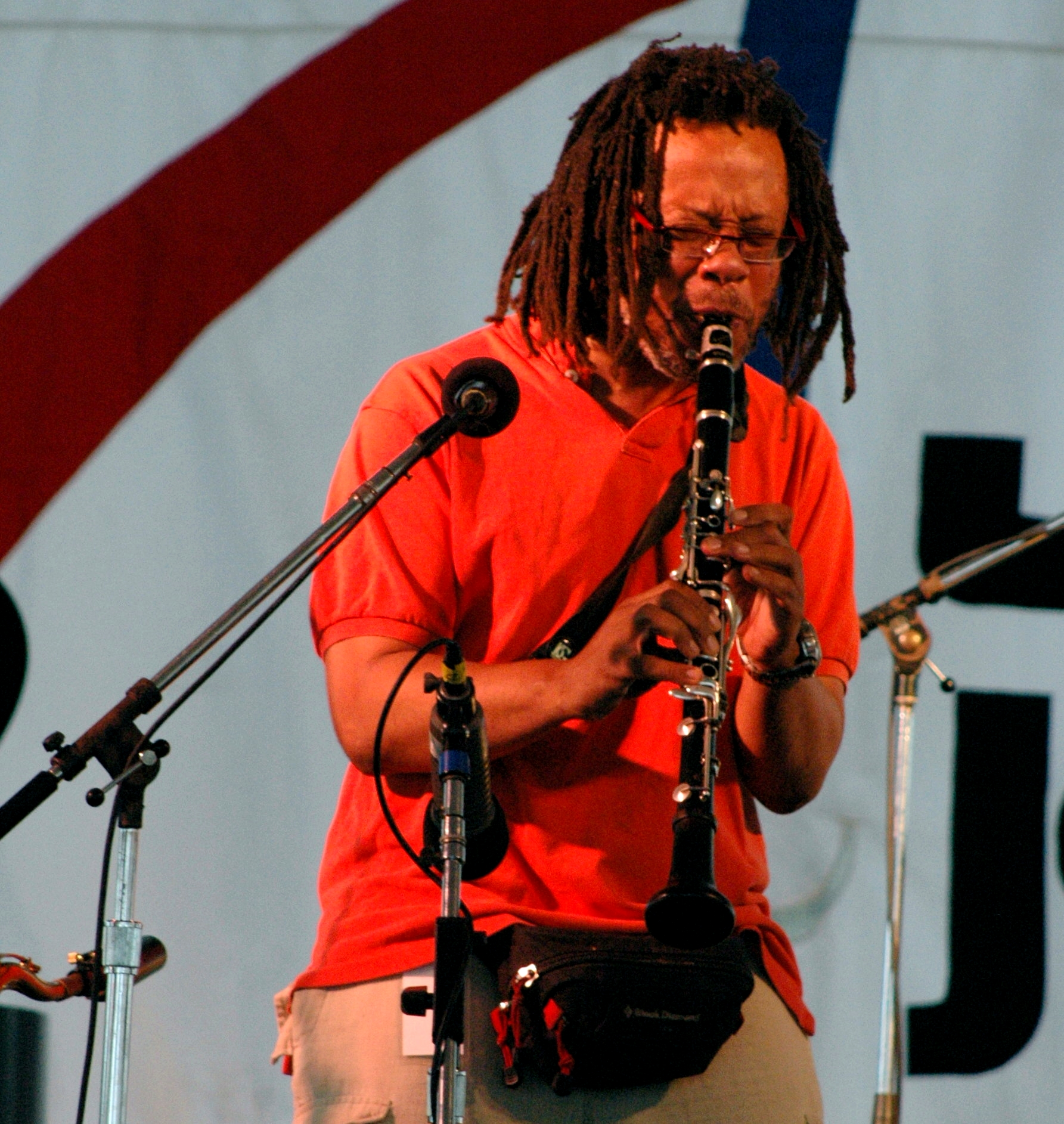
- Byron in 2005

Background information
- Born: November 8, 1958 (age 68); Bronx, New York, United States
- Genre: Avant-garde jazz klezmer
- Occupation: Musician
- Instruments: Clarinet, bass clarinet, saxophone
- Years active: 1980s–present
- Labels: Nonesuch, Blue Note, Cantaloupe

Donald Byron (born November 8, 1958) is an American composer and multi-instrumentalist. He primarily plays clarinet but has also played bass clarinet and saxophone in a variety of genres that includes free jazz and klezmer.

== Biography ==
His mother was a pianist. His father worked as a mailman and played bass in calypso bands. Byron listened to Dizzy Gillespie and Miles Davis while growing up, but he was exposed to other styles through trips to the ballet and symphony orchestra. When he was a child, he had asthma, and a doctor recommended playing an instrument to improve his breathing. This was why he started playing clarinet. He grew up in the South Bronx among many Jewish neighbors who sparked an interest in klezmer. Other influences include Joe Henderson, Artie Shaw, Jimmy Hamilton, and Tony Scott. In his teens he took clarinet lessons from Joe Allard. George Russell was one of his teachers at the New England Conservatory of Music in Boston. At the school he was a member of Klezmer Conservatory Band led by Hankus Netsky. In the 1980s he moved to New York City where he played with avant-garde jazz musicians such as Hamiet Bluiett, Craig Harris, and David Murray.

Byron is a member of the Black Rock Coalition. In 2001, he performed "Bli Blip" for the Red Hot Organization's compilation album Red Hot + Indigo, a tribute to Duke Ellington which raised money for charities devoted to increasing AIDS awareness and fighting the disease. He has recorded with Bill Frisell, Joe Henry, Marc Ribot, Vernon Reid, and Allen Toussaint.

He has worked as a professor at Metropolitan State University of Denver (2015), The University at Albany (2005–2009), and MIT (2007–2008), teaching composition, improvisation, music history, clarinet, and saxophone.

Byron is a practicing jazz historian, and some of his albums have been recreations (in spirit) of forgotten moments in the history of popular music. Examples are Plays the Music of Mickey Katz and Bug Music.

== Awards and honors ==
Byron won the Rome Prize Fellowship awarded by the American Academy in Rome in 2009. His Seven Etudes for solo piano, commissioned by pianist Lisa Moore, made him a finalist for the Pulitzer Prize in Musical Composition in 2009. He was nominated for a Grammy Award for Best Jazz Instrumental Solo in 2005 for his bass clarinet solo on "I Want to Be Happy" from Ivey-Divey.

He was a judge for the second annual Independent Music Awards.

Byron was named a 2007 USA Prudential Fellow and awarded a grant by United States Artists, a public charity that supports and promotes the work of American artists. He also won a Guggenheim Fellowship in 2007.

== Discography ==
=== As leader/co-leader ===
- Tuskegee Experiments (Nonesuch, 1992)
- Don Byron Plays the Music of Mickey Katz (Nonesuch, 1993)
- Music for Six Musicians (Nonesuch, 1995)
- No-Vibe Zone: Live at the Knitting Factory (Knitting Factory, 1996)
- Bug Music (Nonesuch, 1996)
- Nu Blaxploitation (Blue Note, 1998)
- Romance with the Unseen (Blue Note, 1999)
- A Fine Line: Arias and Lieder (Blue Note, 2000)
- You Are #6: More Music for Six Musicians (Blue Note, 2001)
- Ivey-Divey (Blue Note, 2004)
- Do the Boomerang – The Music of Junior Walker (Blue Note, 2006)
- Love, Peace, and Soul (Savoy, 2011)
- Random Dances and (A)Tonalities with Aruán Ortiz (Intakt, 2018) – rec. 2017

=== As composer ===
- Bang on a Can All Stars & Don Byron: A Ballad for Many (Cantaloupe, 2006)
- Lisa Moore: Seven (Cantaloupe, 2009)
- String Quartet No. 2; Four Thoughts on Marvin Gaye, III, ETHEL: Light (Cantaloupe, 2006)
- String Quartet No. 2; Four Thoughts on Marvin Gaye, I–IV, ETHEL: Heavy (Innova, 2012)

=== As sideman ===
With Uri Caine

- Sphere Music (JMT, 1993)
- Toys (JMT, 1995)
- Urlicht / Primal Light (Winter & Winter, 1997)
- The Sidewalks of New York: Tin Pan Alley (Winter & Winter, 1999)
- The Goldberg Variations (Winter & Winter, 2000)
- Gustav Mahler: Dark Flame (Winter & Winter, 2003)

With Marilyn Crispell

- Stellar Pulsations (Leo, 1994)
- Live in San Francisco (Music & Arts, 1995)

With Bill Frisell

- Have a Little Faith (Elektra Nonesuch, 1993)
- This Land (Nonesuch, 1994)
- The Sweetest Punch: The New Songs of Elvis Costello and Burt Bacharach Arranged by Bill Frisell (Decca, 1999)

With Craig Harris

- Shelter (JMT, 1987)
- Blackout in the Square Root of Soul (JMT, 1988)
- Souls Within the Veil (Aquastra Music, 2005)

With David Murray

- David Murray Big Band (DIW/Columbia, 1991)
- South of the Border (DIW/Columbia, 1993)

With Neufeld-Occhipinti Jazz Orchestra

- You Are Here (Auracle, 1998)
- Highwire (True North, 2002)

With Ralph Peterson Jr.

- Presents the Fo'tet (Somethin' Else/Blue Note, 1990)
- Ornettology (Somethin' Else/Blue Note, 1992)
- The Fo'Tet Augmented (Criss Cross, 2004)

With Bobby Previte

- Weather Clear, Track Fast (Enja, 1991)
- Hue and Cry (Enja, 1993)

With Reggie Workman

- Images (Music & Arts, 1990)
- Altered Spaces (Leo, 1993)

With others

- Ralph Alessi, This Against That (RKM Music, 2002)
- Daniel Barenboim, A Tribute to Ellington (Teldec, 1999)
- Hamiet Bluiett, The Clarinet Family (Black Saint, 1987)
- Anthony Braxton, 4 (Ensemble) Compositions 1992 (Black Saint, 1993)
- Steve Coleman, Drop Kick (Novus, 1992)
- Douglas Ewart & Inventions Clarinet Choir, Angles of Entrance (Aarawak, 1996)
- D. D. Jackson, Paired Down, Vol. 2 (Just In Time, 1998)
- Edsel Gomez, Cubist Music (Tba, 2002)
- Jerome Harris, Hidden in Plain View (New World/Countercurrents, 1995)
- Gerry Hemingway, Special Detail (hatArt, 1991)
- Joe Henry, Fuse (Anti-, 2003)
- Leroy Jenkins, Themes & Improvisations on the Blues (CRI, 1994)
- Hoppy Kamiyama, Welcome to Forbidden Paradise (Toshiba-EMI, 1992)
- Living Colour, Time's Up (Epic, 1990)
- Hector Martignon, The Foreign Affair (Candid, 1998)
- Mandy Patinkin, Dress Casual (CBS, 1990)
- Tom Pierson, Planet of Tears (Auteur, 1996)
- Vernon Reid, Mistaken Identity (Sony, 1996)
- Marc Ribot, Rootless Cosmopolitans (Antilles, 1990)
- Lalo Schifrin, Esperanto (Act, 2000)
- Third Person: The Bends (Knitting Factory, 1990)
- Allen Toussaint; The Bright Mississippi (Nonesuch, 2009)
- Suzanne Vega, Nine Objects of Desire (A&M, 1996)
- Hal Willner, Weird Nightmare: Meditations on Mingus (Columbia, 1992)
- Cassandra Wilson, Blue Light 'til Dawn (Blue Note, 1993)
