= Sekou Sundiata =

- Born: Robert Franklin Feaster; August 22, 1948; Harlem, New York, U.S.
- Died: July 18, 2007 (aged 58) Valhalla, New York, U.S.
- Occupation: Writing Professor at New School University
- Instrument: Spoken Word

Sekou Sundiata (August 22, 1948 – July 18, 2007) was an African-American poet and performer, as well as a teacher at The New School in New York City. His students include musicians Ani DiFranco and Mike Doughty. His plays include The Circle Unbroken is a Hard Bop, The Mystery of Love, Udu, and The 51st Dream State. He also released several albums, including Longstoryshort and The Blue Oneness of Dreams. The Blue Oneness of Dreams was nominated for a Grammy Award. In 2000 Sundiata received the Creative Capital Performing Arts Award.

His subjects included Jimi Hendrix, Nelson Mandela, and reparations for slavery.

Sundiata was a Sundance Institute Screenwriting Fellow, a Columbia University Revson Fellow, a Master Artist-in-Residence at the Atlantic Center for the Arts in Florida, the first Writer-in-Residence at The New School university in New York, and a professor at Eugene Lang College. He was a featured poet on two occasions at the Geraldine R. Dodge Poetry Festival, most recently in 2006.

== Early life and education ==
Sekou Sundiata was born Robert Franklin Feaster in Harlem, New York, but changed his name in the late 1960s to honor his African heritage. He graduated with a bachelor's degree in English from the City College of New York in 1972, before successfully undertaking a master's degree in creative writing from the City University of New York.

== Performance ==
In 1977, Sundiata together with poets including Rashidah Ismaili, Sandra Maria Esteves, Akua Lezli Hope, Mervyn Taylor and others formed the Calabash Poets Workshop, regularly producing events.

Sundiata's works combined poetry, music and drama. His musical influences included jazz, blues, funk and Afro-Caribbean rhythms. He worked closely with Craig Harris on works such as Udu, about slavery in modern Mauritania, and The Circle Unbroken is a Hard Bop about African Americans reaching adulthood in the 1960s.

Sundiata based his one-man show Blessing the Boats on experiences of heroin addiction (back in the 60s), a car crash and a kidney transplant from a friend. He toured the show around the United States and internationally. The impact of the show inspired members of the audience to volunteer to become organ donors.

His last work, the 51st (dream) state, featured music, dance, video and poetry about the responses to the September 11, 2001 attacks. After a performance at the Melbourne Festival, the show was performed at the Brooklyn Academy of Music in November 2006.

== Recorded works ==
Sundiata recorded a number of works. His first album, The Blue Oneness of Dreams (Mouth Almighty Records 1997) was nominated for a Grammy. He toured with Ani DiFranco on her Rhythm and News tour in 2001 and his longstoryshort album was released on DiFranco's Righteous Babe label.

Sundiata's work was featured on HBO's Def Poetry series and PBS's The Language of Life.

== Teaching career ==
Sundiata taught writing at The New School in New York City. DiFranco was one of his students and claimed at the time of his death that Sundiata "taught me everything I know about poetry."

Mike Doughty also studied under Sundiata in DiFranco's class. He wrote "Screenwriter's Blues", which was a minor hit for his band Soul Coughing in the 1990s, while studying in Sundiata's class.

Another musician/poet who studied with Sundiata (at Eugene Lang College at The New School for Liberal Arts) was Spin Doctors' lead singer Chris Barron. In fact, it was Sekou that coined the name "Spin Doctors" for the newly formed band in 1988/89.

== Death ==
Sekou Sundiata died of heart failure at a hospital in Valhalla, New York on July 18, 2007. He had struggled with many life-threatening conditions throughout his life, including cancer, kidney failure, a kidney transplant, pneumonia, and a broken neck sustained in an auto accident.
