= Four Tet discography =

Kieran Hebden discography
- Studio albums: 12
- Extended plays: 3
- Live albums: 7
- Compilation albums: 4
- Singles: 37
- Video albums: 1

This is a comprehensive listing of releases, collaborations, remixes and productions documenting the solo work of the British electronic musician Kieran Hebden. Alongside his role as a member of Fridge, Hebden performs as a solo artist under the moniker Four Tet, and has performed in duos with Steve Reid and William Tyler.

To date, Four Tet has released twelve studio albums, seven live albums, four compilation albums, three DJ mix albums, three EPs, thirty-seven singles and one DVD on Output Recordings, Domino Records, Text Records, Azuli Records and Studio !K7. Kieran Hebden and Steve Reid have released four studio albums on Domino Records.

Hebden's debut solo release was the single "Double Density", released in 1997 under the name 4T Recordings.

== Four Tet ==
=== Studio albums ===
List of studio albums, with selected details, chart positions and certifications
Title	Details	Peak chart positions						
Title	Details	UK	BEL (FL)	IRE	SCO	UK Dance	US	US Dance
Dialogue	Released: 1 February 1999; Label: Output Recordings	—	—	—	—	—	—	—
Pause	Released: 28 May 2001; Label: Domino Records	—	—	—	—	—	—	—
Rounds	Released: 5 May 2003; Label: Domino Records	60	—	57	48	—	—	25
Everything Ecstatic	Released: 23 May 2005; Label: Domino Records	59	—	67	—	—	—	—
There Is Love in You	Released: 25 January 2010; Label: Domino Records	35	83	56	—	3	157	17
Pink	Released: 20 August 2012; Label: Text Records	74	—	—	—	3	—	23
Beautiful Rewind	Released: 14 October 2013; Label: Text Records	108	152	—	—	19	—	15
Morning/Evening	Released: 21 June 2015; Label: Text Records	48	94	—	57	—	—	23
New Energy	Released: 29 September 2017; Label: Text Records	48	—	—	70	1	—	—
Sixteen Oceans	Released: 13 March 2020; Label: Text Records	34	143	—	26	—	—	22
Parallel	Released: 25 December 2020; Label: Text Records	—	—	—	—	—	—	—
Three	Released: 15 March 2024; Label: Text Records	66	177	—	14	1	—	—

=== Live albums ===
- Live in Copenhagen 30th March 2004 (Domino Records, 10 April 2004)
- Live at Funkhaus Berlin, 10th May 2018 (Text Records, 22 August 2018) (Under moniker "4TLR" on Spotify)
- Live in Tokyo, 1st December 2013 (Text Records, 5 September 2018) (Under moniker "4TLR" on Spotify)
- Live at Hultsfred Festival, 18th June 2004 (Text Records, 12 September 2018) (Under moniker "4TLR" on Spotify)
- Live at LPR New York, 17th February 2010 (Text Records, 26 September 2018) (Under moniker "4TLR" on Spotify)
- Live at Alexandra Palace London, 8th and 9th May 2019 (Text Records, 8 May 2019)
- Live at Alexandra Palace London, 24th May 2023 (Text Records, 3 November 2023) (Under moniker "4TLR" on Spotify)

=== Compilation albums ===
- Remixes (Domino Records, 25 September 2006)
- Angel Echoes Remixes (Domino Records, 2010)
- Twitter 100k (self-released, 2013)
- Randoms (self-released, 20 June 2016)

=== Mix albums ===
- Late Night Tales: Four Tet (Azuli Records, 4 October 2004) (DJ mix album in the Late Night Tales series)
- DJ Mix (Domino Records) (Rounds-era promo album)
- DJ-Kicks: Four Tet (Studio !K7, 26 June 2006) (DJ mix album in the DJ-Kicks series)
- Much Love to the Plastic People (December 2009) (There Is Love in You-era promo album)
- FabricLive.59 (Fabric Recordings, 2011) (DJ mix album in the FabricLive series)

=== Extended plays ===
- Paws (Domino Records, 3 September 2001)
- Everything Ecstatic Part 2 (Domino Records, 7 November 2005)
- Ringer (Domino Records, 21 April 2008)

=== Singles ===
- "Double Density" (Output Recordings, 1997) (as 4T Recordings)
- "Falken's Maze" (Go! Beat, 1998) (as Joshua Falken)
- "Thirtysixtwentyfive" (Output Recordings, 27 July 1998)
- "Misnomer" (Output Recordings, 21 December 1998)
- "Glasshead" / "Calamine" (double A-side) (Output Recordings, July 1999); #197 UK
- "No More Mosquitoes" (Domino Records, 2 July 2001)
- "I'm on Fire" (Domino Records, 1 May 2002)
- "She Moves She" (Domino Records, 31 March 2003); #180 UK
- "As Serious as Your Life" (Domino Records, 20 October 2003); #119 UK
- "My Angel Rocks Back and Forth" (Domino Records, 3 May 2004); #156 UK
- "Castles Made of Sand" (Azuli Records, 4 October 2004) (b/w "Don'ts" by David Shrigley)
- "Smile Around the Face" (Domino Records, 11 April 2005); #189 UK
- "Sun Drums and Soil" (Domino Records, 11 July 2005); #197 UK
- "A Joy" (Domino Records, 24 October 2005); #96 UK
- "Pockets" (Studio !K7, 12 June 2006)
- "Love Cry" (Domino Records, 2 November 2009)
- "Locked" / "Pyramid" (Text Records, 12 September 2011)
- "Jupiters" / "Ocoras" (Text Records, 28 May 2012)
- "128 Harps" (Text Records, 2 July 2012)
- "Lion" / "Peace for Earth" (Text Records, 15 October 2012)
- "Kool FM" (Text Records, 2013)
- "Two Thousand and Seventeen" (Text Records, 2017)
- "SW9 9SL" / "Planet" (Text Records, 2017)
- "Scientists" (Text Records, 2017)
- "Teenage Birdsong" (Text Records, 2019)
- "Dreamer" (Text Records, 2019)
- "Anna Painting" (Text Records, 2019)
- "Baby" (Text Records, 2020)
- "4T Recordings" (Text Records, 2020)
- "Mango Feedback" / "Watersynth" (Text Records, 10 August 2022)
- "Baby Again" (with Fred Again and Skrillex) (Atlantic, 17 March 2023)
- "Three Drums" (Text Records, 26 April 2023)
- "Loved" (Text Records, 10 January 2024)
- "Daydream Repeat" (Text Records, 14 February 2024)
- "In My Dreams" (with Ellie Goulding) (Text Records, 9 September 2024)
- "Into Dust (Still Falling)" (Text Records, 17 June 2026)
- "Human Voice" (Text Records, 31 July 2026)

=== Collaborative singles ===
- "Crawl, End Crawl" (Columbia, 2008) (collaboration with David Arnold for Quantum of Solace)
- "Moth" / "Wolf Cub" (Text Records, 1 May 2009) (with Burial)
- "Ego" / "Mirror" (Text, 16 March 2011) (with Burial and Thom Yorke)
- "Nova" (Text, 19 March 2012) (with Burial)
- "Roseland" / "Metropolis" (Text, 2013) (with Rocketnumbernine)
- "Makondi" (Brownswood, 2014) (with Emanative)
- "Glassbeadgames (8 Hours At Fabric Dub)" (Ninja Tune, 2014) (with Martyn)
- "Killer" / "Nasty" (Text, 2014) (with Terror Danjah)
- "Mothers" / "Dark" (Text, 2016) (with Designer)
- "Flip Side" / "Disparate" (Text, 2016) (with Champion)
- "Her Revolution" / "His Rope" (XL, 2020) (with Burial and Thom Yorke)
- "Butterflies" (Owsla / Atlantic Records, 2021) (with Skrillex and Starrah)

=== Split releases ===
- "Rivers Become Oceans" (Lo Recordings, May 1999) (split with Rothko)
- "Four Tet v Pole EP" (aka Pole v Four Tet EP) (The Leaf Label, June 2000) (split with Pole)
- "Hella/Four Tet Split" (Ache Records, March 2004) (split 7-inch with Hella)
- "Nothing to See" / "Don't Let Me Go" (Soul Jazz Records, July 2010) (split 12-inch with Mala)
- "Pinnacles" / "Ye Ye" (Text Records, March 2011, split 12-inch with Daphni)

=== Video ===
- Everything Ecstatic DVD edition (Domino Records, 7 November 2005) (DVD featuring video clips for each track of the album plus Everything Ecstatic Part 2 CD)

=== Online mixes and podcasts ===
- RA.102 (Resident Advisor, 2008)
- Much Love to the Plastic People (self-released, 2009)
- Essential Mix (BBC, 2010)
- fabric podcast 34/35 (fabric, 2010)
- Return to Plastic People (FACT Mix 182) (FACT Magazine, 2010)
- Boiler Room 49 (Boiler Room, 2011)
- Beats in Space 587 (Beats in Space, 2011)
- Conference of the Birds (self-released, 2012)
- Just Jam 86 (Just Jam, 2013)
- Solid Steel Podcast 176 (Solid Steel, 2013)
- 1234567890qwertyuiopasdfghjklzxcvbnm (self-released, 2014)
- Just Jam 117 (Just Jam, 2014)
- Ray-Ban x Boiler Room 004 SXSW Warehouse (Boiler Room, 2014)
- Plastic People Closing Party, London (with Floating Points) (self-released, 2015)
- Essential Mix (with Jamie xx) (BBC, 2015)
- Boiler Room, London (Boiler Room, 2015)
- Resident Advisor Pres. Ibiza 20, R1 Dance Radio (Resident Advisor, 2015)
- Dekmantel Podcast 032 (Dekmantel, 2015)
- Live at Far Away, Los Angeles, 28 October (self-released, 2016)
- Essential Mix (BBC, 2018)
- Lost Village 25th August 2018 (self-released, 2018)

== Kieran Hebden and Steve Reid ==
=== Albums ===
- The Exchange Session Vol. 1 (Domino Records, 27 February 2006)
- The Exchange Session Vol. 2 (Domino Records, 22 May 2006)
- Tongues (Domino Records, 19 March 2007)
- NYC (Domino Records, 4 November 2008)

=== Live albums ===
- Live at the South Bank (with Mats Gustafsson) (Smalltown Supersound, 14 November 2011)

=== Singles ===
- "People Be Happy" / "Rhythm Dance" (Domino Records, 11 March 2007)
- "The Sun Never Sets" (Domino Records, 12 March 2007)

== Kieran Hebden and William Tyler ==
=== Albums ===
- 41 Longfield Street Late ‘80s (Temporary Residence, 19 September 2025)

=== Singles ===
- "Darkness, Darkness" / "No Services" (Psychic Hotline, 30 June 2023)
- "If I Had A Boat" (Temporary Residence, 21 May 2025)
- "Spider Ballad" (Temporary Residence, 23 July 2025)

== KH ==
=== Singles ===
- "The Track I've Been Playing That People Keep Asking About and That Joy Used in His RA Mix and Daphni Played On Boiler Room" (Text Records, 4 February 2013)
- "BACK2THESTART" (SoundCloud, 2015)
- "Question" (Text Records, 2017)
- "Only Human" (feat. Nelly Furtado) (Text Records, 2019)
- "Looking At Your Pager" (Text Records, 20 May 2022)

=== Video ===
- "Looking At Your Pager" – 20 May 2022

== Percussions ==
=== Albums ===
- 2011 until 2014 (Text Records, 2015)

=== Singles ===
- "Percussions One/Percussions Two" (Text Records, 2011)
- "Bird Songs/Rabbit Songs" (Text Records, 2012)
- "ASCII Bot/Blatant Water Cannon" (Text Records, 2014)
- "KHLHI" (Text Records, 2014)
- "Digital Arpeggios" (Text Records, 2015)

== 00110100 01010100 ==
=== Albums ===
- 0181 (Text Records, 15 January 2013)
- 871 (Text Records, December 2020)

== ⣎⡇ꉺლ༽இ•̛)ྀ◞ ༎ຶ ༽ৣৢ؞ৢ؞ؖ ꉺლ ==
The titles of these releases are composed from sequences of characters from the extended Unicode character set.

Name	Release type	Release year
҉.·.·*´¨.·*:･✧๑ඕั ҉	Single	2017
･✧⃛(ཽ๑ඕัළ*.。 *¨°。	Single	2017
)✧⃛*	EP	2017
̸ ̡ ҉ ҉.·๑ඕั ҉ ̸ ̡ ҉ ҉.·๑ඕั ҉ ̸ ̡ ҉ ҉.·๑ඕั ҉ ̸ ̡ ҉ ҉.·๑ඕั ҉ ̸ ̡ ҉ ҉.·๑ඕั ҉ ̸ ̡ ҉ ҉.·๑	Single	2018
ʅ͡͡͡͡͡͡͡͡͡͡͡(ƟӨ)ʃ͡͡͡͡͡͡͡͡͡͡ ꐑ(ཀ ඊູ ఠీੂ೧ູ࿃ूੂ✧ළඕั࿃ूੂ࿃ूੂੂ࿃ूੂළඕั✧ı̴̴̡ ̡̡͡|̲̲̲͡ ̲̲̲͡͡π̲̲͡͡ ɵੂ≢࿃ूੂ೧ູఠీੂ ඊູཀ ꐑ(ʅ͡͡͡͡͡͡͡͡͡͡͡(ƟӨ)ʃ͡͡͡͡͡͡͡͡͡͡	Single	2019
ooo ̟̞̝̜̙̘̗̖҉̵̴̨̧̢̡̼̻̺̹̳̲̱̰̯̮̭̬̫̪̩̦̥̤̣̠҈͈͇͉͍͎͓͔͕͖͙͚͜͢͢͢͢͢͢͢͢͢͢͢͢͢͢ͅ oʅ͡͡͡͡͡͡͡͡͡͡͡( ؞ৢ؞ؙؖ⁽⁾˜ัิีึื์๎้็๋๊⦁0 ̟̞̝̜̙̘̗̖҉̵̴̨̧̢̡̼̻̺̹̳̲̱̰̯̮̭̬̫̪̩̦̥̤̣̠҈͈͇͉͍͎͓͔͕͖͙͚͜͢͢͢͢͢͢͢͢͢͢͢͢͢͢ͅ ఠీੂ೧ູ࿃ूੂ	EP	2020
(̸̢̛̼̞̭͋ͅ)̸͚̰͛̔̾̀̿͒͂v̴̢͚͚͎ȯ̶̞̮͖̑̈́)̸̳̥̰̜̥̺̐ͅ)̴͎̜͍̱̋̌͋̓̾̚ ̷̨ʅ͡͡͡͡͡͡͡͡͡͡͡(۝ʅ͡͡͡͡͡͡͡͡͡͡͡(Ɵʅ͡͡͡͡͡͡͡͡͡͡͡(̸̢̛̼̞̭͋ͅ)̸͚̰͛̔̾̀̿͒͂:̴͓̞̑̌̂̆̊͋̀:̸͎̟̯̂̓̌:̶̢͙͙͕̠̩͆(̷̮͍͚̫͚͂̍)̵̳̗̊(Ɵʅ͡͡͡͡͡͡͡͡͡͡͡(̸̢̛̼̞̭͋ͅ)̸͚̰͛̔̾̀̿͒͂v̴̢͚͚͎ȯ̶̞̮͖̑̈́)̸̳̥̰̜̥̺̐ͅ)̴͎̜͍̱̋̌͋̓̾̚ ̷̨ʅ͡͡͡͡͡͡͡͡͡͡͡	Single	2022
̟̞̝̜̙̘̗̖҉̵̴̨̧̢̡̼̻̺̹̳̲̱̰̯̮̭̬̫̪̩̦̥̤̣̠҈͈͇͉͍͎͓͔͕͖͙͚͜͢͢͢͢͢͢͢͢͢͢͢͢͢͢ͅ ̟̞̝̜̙̘̗̖҉̵̴̨̧̢̡̼̻̺̹̳̲̱̰̯̮̭̬̫̪̩̦̥̤̣̠҈͈͇͉͍͎͓͔͕͖͙͚͜͢͢͢͢͢͢͢͢͢͢͢͢͢͢ͅ ʅ͡͡͡͡͡͡͡͡͡͡͡(̸̢̛̼̞̭͋ͅ)̸͚̰͛̔̾̀̿͒͂ ʅ͡͡͡͡͡͡͡͡͡͡͡()ʃ͡͡͡͡͡͡͡͡͡͡ ꐑ(ఠీੂ೧ູȯ̶̞̮͖̑̈́)̸̳̥̰̜̥̺̐ͅv̴̢͚͚͎͎̞͒͊̎ȯ̶̞̮͖̑̈́̿)̸̳̥̰̜̥̺̐ͅ࿃ूੂ✧⃛✧⃛)̴͎̜͍̱̋̌͋̓̾̚͜ ̷̨̢̥̅͝ͅ(̸̢̛̼̞̭͋ͅ)̸͚̰͛̔̾̀̿͒͂	EP	2024
ཬɷԾㅍ ̟̞̝̜̙̘̗̖҉̵̴̨̧̢̡̼̻̺̹̳̲̱̰̯̮̭̬̫̪̩̦̥̤̣̠҈͈͇͉͍͎͓͔͕͖͙͚͜͢͢͢͢͢͢͢͢͢͢͢͢͢͢ͅ ꉺლ༽༼இ•̛)ྀ◞ ༎ຶ ̟̞̝̜̙̘̗̖҉̵̴̨̧̢̡̼̻̺̹̳̲̱̰̯̮̭̬̫̪̩̦̥̤̣̠҈͈͇͉͍͎͓͔͕͖͙͚͜͢͢͢͢͢͢͢͢͢͢͢͢͢͢ͅ ლ༽இ•̛)ྀ◞☼⃝◞⊖◟☼⃝ ◉፨∷▲∵⣎⡇ ⃝͢ oOo▲༎ຶ ༽ৣৢ؞ৢ؞ؙؖ⁽⁾ا҉҈҉҈҉҈҉҈҉҈҉҈҉҈҉҈҉҈҉҈҉҈҉҈҉⦁⁾⁽ؙۜؖء؞ૣ࿆˜ัิีึื์๎้็๋๊☼⃝◞⊖◟☼⃝ ◉፨∷▲∵⣎⡇ ⃝͢ oOo▲	Single	2025
ʅ͡͡͡͡͡͡͡͡͡͡͡(̸̢̛̼̞̭͋ͅ)̸͚̰͛̔̾̀̿͒͂:̴͓̞̑̌̂̆̊͋̀:̸͎̟̯̂̓̌ ҉ ͡ ͞ ͞ ͞ ҉● ࿀ ● ࿀ ● ҉⃝ ⃝͢ ͞ ͘ ͞⃝̕ ͢ ̛ ⃝ ̸ ̡ ͢⃝̧ ͡ ͡ ̀ ̧ ̢⃝͜ ҉ ͞ ͞ ⃝͞ ͘ ͞ ͡⃝ ⃝҉҈҉҈҉҈҉҈҉҈҉ :̶̢͙͙͕̠̩͆(̷̮͍͚̫͚͂̍)̵̳̗̊( ̟̞̝̜̙̘̗̖҉̵̴̨̧̢̡̼̻̺̹̳̲̱̰̯̮̭̬̫̪̩̦̥̤̣̠҈͈͇͉͍͎͓͔͕͖͙͚͜͢͢͢͢͢͢͢͢͢͢͢͢͢͢ͅ l̡̡̡ ̡͌ Ɵʅ͡͡͡͡͡͡͡͡͡͡͡(̸	Album	2026

== Remixes ==
- Urban Species – "Blanket" (Talkin' Loud, 1999)
- Rothko – "Rivers Become Oceans" (Lo Recordings, 1999)
- The Cinematic Orchestra – "Ode to the Big Sea" (Ninja Tune, 1 August 1999)
- Aphex Twin – "Untitled (Cliffs)" (Warp Records, 12 October 1999)
- Pole – "Heim" (The Leaf Label, 26 June 2000)
- David Holmes – "69 Police" (Go! Beat Records, 7 August 2000)
- Regular Fries – "Brainticket" (Mixmag, 1 November 2000)
- Slag Boom Van Loom – "Sutedja" (Planet Mu, 29 May 2001)
- His Name Is Alive – "One Year" (4AD Records, 9 July 2001)
- Two Banks of Four – "Street Lullaby" (Sirkus Recordings, 6 August 2001)
- The Dining Rooms – "Cosi Ti Amo" (Milano 2000, 27 September 2001)
- Kings of Convenience – "The Weight of My Words" (Source Records, 30 October 2001)
- James Yorkston – "The Lang Toun" (Domino Records, 25 March 2002)
- The Notwist – "This Room" (City Slang Records, April 2002) in collaboration with Manitoba
- Badly Drawn Boy – "Something to Talk About" (XL Recordings, 10 June 2002)
- Doves – "M62 Song" (Heavenly Records, 15 July 2002)
- Blue States – "Metro Sound" (XL Recordings, 1 August 2002)
- Jef Gilson – "Fables of Gutenburg" (Isma's, 2003)
- Bussetti – "Softly" (Realise Records, July 2003)
- Super Furry Animals – "The Piccolo Snare" (Placid Casual, 21 July 2003)
- Beth Orton – "Daybreaker" (Heavenly Records, September 2003)
- Beth Orton – "Carmella" (Heavenly Records, September 2003)
- Bonobo – "Pick Up" (Ninja Tune, 20 October 2003)
- Radiohead – "Skttrbrain" (Parlophone, 17 November 2003)
- Sia – "Breathe Me" (Go! Beat Records, February 2004)
- Boom Bip – "Third Stream" (Lex Records, 31 May 2004)
- Lars Horntveth – "Tics" (Smalltown Supersound, 14 June 2004)
- Hot Chip – "The Ass Attack" (Moshi Moshi Records, 4 October 2004)
- Pedro – "Fear & Resilience" (Melodisc, 18 October 2004)
- Cyne – "Automaton" (City Centre Offices, 2005)
- Coldplay – "Fix You" (2005, unreleased)
- Black Sabbath – "Iron Man" (from the album Everything Comes & Goes, Temporary Residence Limited, 11 April 2005)
- Madvillain – Four Tet Remixes ("Meat Grinder", "Accordion", "Money Folder", "Great Day", "Rhinestone Cowboy", "Shadows of Tomorrow (Instrumental)") (Stones Throw Records, May 2005)
- Galactic Soul – "Cosmic Soul Street Classics" (BBE, 2 May 2005)
- Bloc Party – "So Here We Are" (V2 Records, 3 May 2005)
- Juana Molina – "Sálvese Quien Pueda" (Domino Records, 16 May 2005)
- Jamie Lidell – "The City" (Warp, 2006)
- Adem – "Launch Yourself" (Domino Records, 2006)
- The Memory Band – "Come Write Me Down" (Peacefrog Records, 2006)
- Archie Bronson Outfit – "Dead Funny" (Domino Records, 2006)
- The Longcut – "Vitamin C" (Sony Records, 2006)
- Aluminium – "Forever For Her" (XL Recordings, 2006)
- Steve Reich – "Drumming" (Nonsuch 2006)
- Arab Strap – "The First Big Weekend" (Chemikal Underground, 2006)
- Roger O'Donnell – "For the Truth In You" (Great Society, 2006)
- Anne Wirz – "Guerrière" (Heavenly Sweetness, 2006)
- Explosions in the Sky – "Catastrophe and the Cure" (Temporary Residence, 2007)
- Matthew Dear – "Deserter" (Ghostly International, 2007)
- Battles – "Tonto" (Warp, 2007)
- Caribou – "Melody Day" (Colette, 2007)
- The Drift – "Gardening, Not Architecture" (Temporary Residence, 2007)
- Nathan Fake – "You Are Here" (Border Community, 2007)
- Doug Hammond – "Dope of Power Suite" (Heavenly Sweetness, 2007)
- Thom Yorke – "Atoms For Peace" (XL Recordings, 2008)
- Born Ruffians – "I Need a Life" (Warp, 2008)
- Andrew Bird – "Imitosis" (Chrysalis, 2008)
- Joe Goddard – "Apple Bobbing" (Greco-Roman, 2009)
- Anti-Pop Consortium – "Volcano" (Big Dada Recordings, 2009)
- Manic Street Preachers – "Pretension/Repulsion" (Columbia, 2009)
- Guv'ner – "Baby's Way Cruel" (Merge, 2009)
- The Acorn – "Restoration" (Bella Union, 2010)
- Babe, Terror – "Summertime Our League" (Phantasy, 2010)
- Lindstrøm & Christabelle – "Lovesick" (Smalltown Supersound, 2010)
- Rocketnumbernine – "Matthew and Toby" (Text, 2010)
- The xx – "VCR" (XL, 2010)
- Bob Holroyd – "African Drug" (Phonica, 2010)
- Pantha du Prince – "Stick To My Side" (Rough Trade, 2010)
- Tegan and Sara – "Alligator" (Sire, 2010)
- Jon Hopkins – "Vessel" (Double Six, 2010)
- Eluvium – "The Motion Makes Me Last" (Temporary Residence, 2010)
- Radiohead – "Separator" (Ticker Tape Ltd. 2011)
- Crazy Bald Heads – "First Born" (Text, 2011)
- Tinariwen – "Tenere Taqqim Tossam" (Rise Record Club, 2011)
- Emanative & Ahmed Abdullah – "Lions of Judah" (Brownswood Recordings, 2011)
- Neneh Cherry & The Thing – "Dream Baby Dream" (Smalltown Supersound, 2012)
- Ultraísta – "Smalltalk" (Ghostly International, 2012)
- FaltyDL – "Straight & Arrow" (Ninja Tune, 2012)
- Hot Chip – "Look At Where We Are" (Domino Records, 2012)
- To Rococo Rot – "He Loves Me" (City Slang, 2012)
- Justin Timberlake ft. Jay-Z – "Suit & Tie" (Sony Music, 2013)
- DIANA – "Perpetual Surrender" (Jagjaguwar, 2013)
- Rocketnumbernine – "Rotunda" (self-released, 2013)
- Grimes – "Skin" (self-released, 2013)
- Gravediggaz – "SID" (self-released, 2013)
- Triumvirat – "Illusions on a Double Dimple" (self-released, 2013)
- Sia – "Chandelier" (RCA, 2014)
- Lana Del Rey – "West Coast" (Polydor, 2014)
- John Beltran – "Faux" (Text, 2014)
- Ellie Goulding – "Burn" (self-released, 2014)
- CHVRCHES – "Leave a Trace" (Virgin EMI Records, 2015)
- Eric Prydz – "Opus" (Pryda Recordings, 2015)
- Hot Chip – "Need You Now" (Domino Records, 2015) (as Percussions)
- Oneohtrix Point Never – "Sticky Drama" (Warp, 2016)
- Shura – "Touch" (Polydor, 2016)
- Tangents – "Jindabyne" (Temporary Residence Ltd., 2016)
- Rihanna – "Kiss It Better" (Roc Nation, 2016)
- Mura Masa & A$AP Rocky – "Love$ick" (Anchor Point, 2016)
- Todd Terje – "Jungelknugen" (Olsen, 2017)
- The xx – "A Violent Noise" (Young, 2017)
- Kaitlyn Aurelia Smith – "I Will Make Room For You" (Western Vinyl, 2017)
- Bicep – "Opal" (Ninja Tune, 2018)
- Sigrid – "Sucker Punch" (Island, 2018)
- Daniel Avery – "Quick Eternity" (Phantasy Sound, 2018)
- Headie One feat. Dave – "18Hunna" (Relentless, 2019)
- Skrillex, Boys Noize and Ty Dolla Sign – "Midnight Hour" (Owsla / Atlantic Records, 2019)
- Caribou – "Never Come Back" (City Slang, 2020)
- Tame Impala – "Is It True" (Modular Recordings, 2020)
- Rozi Plain – "Conditions" (Memphis Industries, 2020) (as Kieran Hebden)
- A Grape Dope – "Rainbo Locals" (AKP Recordings, 2020)
- Krust – "Negative Returns" (Crosstown Rebels, 2020)
- Nina Kraviz – "This Time" (Nina Kraviz Music, 2022)
- Ellie Goulding – "Easy Lover" (Polydor, 2022)
- Chloé Robinson & DJ ADHD – "Pax" (Pretty Weird, 2022)
- Hagop Tchaparian – "Round" (Text, 2022)
- Everything But The Girl – "Nothing Left To Lose" (Buzzin' Fly, 2023)
- Chris Lake feat. Aatig – "In the Yuma" (Black Book, 2023)
- The Cure – "Alone" (Polydor, 2025)
- Sammy Virji, Chris Lake and RoRo – "925" (Capitol, 2025)
- PinkPantheress – "Illegal" (Warner, 2026)
- Turnstile – "Look Out for Me" (Roadrunner, 2026)

== Productions ==
- James Yorkston and the Athletes – Just Beyond the River (Domino Records, 2004)
- Chrome Children Vol. 2 (Stones Throw Records, 2007)
- Sunburned Hand of the Man – Fire Escape (Smalltown Supersound, 2007)
- Steve Reid Ensemble – Daxaar (Domino Records, 2007)
- One Little Plane – Until (Text Records, 2008)
- Foals – "Balloons", "Cassius", & "Tron" (alternate versions available as B-Sides) (Transgressive, 2008)
- Sunburned Hand of the Man – A (Ecstatic Peace, 2010)
- One Little Plane – Into the Trees (Text Records, 2012)
- Omar Souleyman – Wenu Wenu (Sublime Frequencies, 2013)
- Neneh Cherry – Blank Project (Smalltown Supersound, 2014)
- Roots Manuva – "Facety 2:11" (Big Dada, 2015)
- Jamie xx – "Seesaw" (Young, 2015)
- Omar Souleyman – "Bahdeni Nami" (Monkeytown, 2015)
- Katy B – "Calm Down" (EMI, 2016) (co-produced with Floating Points)
- Neneh Cherry – Broken Politics (Smalltown Supersound, 2018)
- Simone Felice – "Puppet" (New York Pro, 2019)
- Dog Unit – Barking to Gospel (mixed by) (Sonic Deterioration, 2020)
- Madlib – Sound Ancestors (Madlib Invazion, 2021)

== See also ==
- Fridge
