= In My Dreams (Four Tet and Ellie Goulding song) =

Single by Four Tet and Ellie Goulding
- Released: September 9, 2024
- Genre: Electronic
- Length: 4:50
- Label: Text Records; Three Six Zero Recordings
- Songwriters: Ellie Goulding; Kieran Hebden
- Producer: Four Tet

Four Tet singles chronology
"Daydream Repeat" (2024)	"In My Dreams" (2024)	"Talk To Me" (2024)

Ellie Goulding singles chronology
"Free" (2024)	"In My Dreams" (2024)	"I Adore You" (Remix) (2024)

Four Tet and Ellie Goulding singles chronology
"Easy Lover" (Remix) (2022)	"In My Dreams" (2024)

Audio video
- "In My Dreams" on YouTube

"In My Dreams" is a song by the English electronic musician and DJ Four Tet and the English singer-songwriter Ellie Goulding.

"In My Dreams" marks the fifth collaboration between Four Tet and Goulding, and the duo's first collaboration since the 2022 remix of Goulding's single "Easy Lover", which earned Four Tet a Grammy Award nomination for Best Remixed Recording; Non-classical. The song was released as a stand-alone single on 9 September 2024 under Text Records and Three Six Zero Recordings to positive reviews from music critics who praised the alignment of Four Tet's signature production with Goulding's "ethereal" vocals.

== Background ==
In My Dreams marks Four Tet and Goulding's fifth collaboration. First, Four Tet remixed Goulding's 2013 smash-hit "Burn", then he sampled the vocals of Goulding's 2010 single "The Writer" for his 2015 track "BACK2THESTART". At the start of the new decade, Goulding performed the lead vocals for Four Tet's "Baby", for his 2020 album Sixteen Oceans, and then Goulding invited him to remix her 2022 single "Easy Lover" which earned Hebden a Grammy nomination.

According to Four Tet the song was made after Goulding's send him voice notes of her vocals with song ideas, she later recorded new vocals for him during the making of it, but Hebden chose to kept the original voice notes instead.

“She’s told me in the past she likes to send me vocals that I can just use as sound and turn into whatever I want (which is how the track ‘Baby’ happened a few years ago), [...] I found other sounds to go with it and made ‘In My Dreams.’ She added some new vocal parts but we ended up keeping the voice note recordings as the main vocal. I guess the first take is often the most magical.”

— Four Tet, explaining how In My Dreams was made, via Instagram

Goulding wrote a long statement on her Instagram account showing her appreciation for Four Tet's work ethic:

“When I reached out to him a while back he never questioned it or had any kind of cynicism and just asked me to send him some vocals sometime. The simplicity of a great producer like Kieran sampling my voice like an instrument weaved in is something I always craved and even in the most minimal way is how I felt I was getting the maximum pleasure out of what I do as a vocalist. Feel like so many producers missed that about me, that’s why I appreciate him so much. I also feel like so many of those same producers wana be him and I get why! He’s totally unique, totally perfectly inconsistent and looks beyond genre, sweeter structures, prettiness and straightforwardness in sound, but still makes any kind of frenzy sound so beautiful, puts serenity at its most blissfully potent and loves a pop sample too. Thqnk you for your music and for working with me Kieran, sometimes I do feel like I’m a little part of actual works of art x."

— Ellie Goulding, talking about her admiration for Four Tet, on Instagram post.

== Promotion ==
Four Tet teased fans playing the track several times through the year on different gigs prior the release of the track, as well posting snippet on his social media accounts. Meanwhile, on the day of release, Goulding shared the lyrics on the comment section of her Instagram post.

"And in my dreams

I fade into the green I love you differently Hand shaped leaves I sleep in your machine but I’m just visiting

Wipe me clean"

— Ellie Goulding, In My Dreams lyrics, shared on her Instagram.

== Reception ==
The song received generally widespread positive reviews for music critics upon release. Oculate dubbed the song as "hypnotic" and "an unforgettable experience", as well a testament of each artist impact and skills in their respective music fields which leads them to "create something truly special". While highlighting Four Tet efforts to push boundaries in electronic music, and Goulding’s voice which "remains one of pop’s most recognisable".

Tomás Mier for Rolling Stone stated that Four Tet and Goulding made "magic" together, as well finding the track reminiscent of Goulding's early work such as her 2011 single "Lights". Jason Heffler for EDM.com described the song as "mesmerizing and beautifully unsettling", and praised it for being a "refreshing breath of unconventional brilliance." in a world of sonic conformity. Robin Murray for Clash Magazine said that "In My Dreams" was a continuation of the pair "special creative relationship". Nicolás Bernanchea for Midnight Dance Music called it "a new piece of craftsmanship in the collection of a brilliant mind". mxdwn Music said that the track "charges out the gate with all the excitement a new [Four] Tet track warrants". Sebas E. Alonso for Jenesaispop called the track "fantastic", and shared Goulding's statement of feeling like she's "making a bit of art alongside Four Tet", meanwhile the website named it their "Song of the Day". Tom Breihan for Stereogum said that the result of Tet's production and Goulding's vocal performance "sounds awesome".

== Release history ==
Release dates and formats for "In My Dreams"
Region	Date	Format	Label	Ref.
Various	9 September 2024	Digital download; streaming	Text Records; Three Six Zero Recordings	

== See also ==
- List of songs recorded by Ellie Goulding
- Four Tet discography
- Ellie Goulding discography
