= Three (Four Tet album) =

Studio album by Four Tet
- Released: 15 March 2024
- Genres: House; downtempo; electronica
- Length: 44:50
- Label: Text
- Producer: Kieran Hebden

Four Tet chronology
Parallel / 871 (2020)	Three (2024)

Singles from Three
- 1. "Three Drums" Released: 27 April 2023; 2. "Loved" Released: 10 January 2024; 3. "Daydream Repeat" Released: 14 February 2024

Three is the twelfth studio album by British electronic musician Four Tet. It was released on 15 March 2024 through Text Records, and had three singles. Hebden collaborated with other musicians before the release of Three. The album is electronica, and takes inspiration from multiple genres. The album received positive reviews from critics and was featured in a year-end list from AllMusic. It charted number one in the UK Dance Albums, number 66 in the UK overall, and number 187 in Belgium.

== Background and release ==
After the release of two solo albums in 2020, the musician collaborated with other artists, including Madlib, Skrillex and Fred Again, and finished a legal battle with the Domino Recording Company. Returning to solo endeavours, Hebden released the lead single "Three Drums" on 27 April 2023. The opening track "Loved" was released on 10 January 2024.

Hebden announced Three on 14 February, and released "Daydream Repeat". Three was released on 15 March through Text Records, Hebden's label. The album artwork was designed by Jason Evans and Matthew Cooper. In promotion of the record, Hebden hosted the "Four Tet & Friends" event in New York on 4–5 May with performances from Floating Points, Ben UFO, and others.

== Composition ==
Three is house, downtempo, and electronica. The album uses many tempos, and keeps a "similarly ruminative mood". The opening track "Loved" features a breakbeat with "sun-seeking tendrils of synth", and contains elements from hip-hop. It utilises shakers, vinyl crackle, and white noise. The track ends with a "gentle ambient outro". The track was produced with a synthesiser gifted by collaborators Floating Points and Dan Snaith. "Gliding Through Everything" contains "glittering ambience", and uses bells and chimes. "Storm Crystals" has a slowed-down breakbeat and a synth for the melody. "Daydream Repeat" uses a guitar with noise alongside a microhouse beat, and fades into a harp. "Skater" is inspired by shoegaze and utilises sub-bass sounds with light drums. It also uses female vocals that "pull the tune away from the darker impulses implied at the beginning". "31 Bloom" is minimal techno, and is similar to Hebden's Ringer (2008). "So Blue" opens with an ambient sound that is broken by a tone with reverb. The albums ends with "Three Drums", and contains "a wall of electronic noise" supported by a "laid back beat" and a hint of "early 90s hip-hop". It opens with a drum loop and a synthesiser, and later adds string instruments, flutes, and distortion. The track closes with a vocal loop.

== Reception ==
Professional ratings
Aggregate scores
Source	Rating
Metacritic	77/100
Review scores
Source	Rating
AllMusic	3.5/5 stars
Clash	8/10
Exclaim!	8/10
Pitchfork	7.8/10

Three received positive reviews from critics. According to the review aggregator Metacritic, Three received "generally favorable reviews" based on a weighted average score of 77 out of 100 from 8 critic scores. AllMusic's Paul Simpson compared the album to Hebden's album Sixteen Oceans (2020), to say that Three was "more tightly focused" than it. Robin Murray of Clash described the album as "[u]ndeniably impressive", and that it shows "wondrous" aspects of Hebden's career. Exclaim! writer Alex Hudson noted the album's focused variety of sounds, to say that "There's a humbleness to Three that comes across in both its brevity and familiarity, as if Hebden isn't interested in pushing himself or listeners into any uncomfortable territory".

Philip Sherburne for Pitchfork said the album contrasts Hebden's collaborations, and while referring to Three's composition, he said "it takes a master craftsperson's skill to create music that scans so simply on the surface but then opens up to reveal hidden rooms within hidden rooms". The Quietus writer Jeremy Allen described Three as "everything you would expect from the 12th Four Tet record". Reid BG of Resident Advisor said that the album "looks backwards and forwards at the same time", and that "one could make the mistake that Hebden's best years are behind him". Rolling Stone's Jeff Ihaza said it was "a pleasantly surprising addition to the canon of electronic music", and showed similarities of the album to the sounds of Madlib.

The album appeared in AllMusic's list of favourite electronic albums from 2024. "Loved" appeared in Pitchfork's list of the best electronic music, and ranked 51th in its list of the best songs, in which both are year-end lists.

== Track listing ==
All tracks are written by Kieran Hebden.

No.	Title	Length
1.	"Loved"	4:03
2.	"Gliding Through Everything"	4:08
3.	"Storm Crystals"	6:40
4.	"Daydream Repeat"	6:08
5.	"Skater"	4:15
6.	"31 Bloom"	5:52
7.	"So Blue"	5:29
8.	"Three Drums"	8:15
Total length:		44:50

== Personnel ==
Credits adapted from Bandcamp.

- Kieran Hebden – writer, producer
- Jason Evans – photography, design
- Matthew Cooper – design

== Charts ==
Chart performance for Three
Chart (2024)	Peak position
Belgian Albums (Ultratop Flanders)	187
Scottish Albums (Official Charts)	14
UK Albums (Official Charts)	66
UK Dance Albums (Official Charts)	1
UK Independent Albums (Official Charts)	4
