= New Energy (album) =

Studio album by Four Tet
- Released: 29 September 2017
- Recorded: 2016–2017
- Genre: Electronic
- Length: 56:21
- Label: Text
- Producer: Kieran Hebden

Four Tet chronology
| Morning/Evening (2015) | New Energy (2017) | Sixteen Oceans (2020) |

Singles from New Energy
- 1. "Two Thousand and Seventeen" Released: 4 July 2017; 2. "Planet" Released: 2 August 2017; 3. "SW9 9SL" Released: 25 August 2017; 4. "Scientists" Released: 13 September 2017

New Energy is the ninth studio album by British electronic musician Kieran Hebden, released under his alias Four Tet on 29 September 2017 by Text Records. The album follows a more uptempo, listener-friendly style than previous Four Tet records while containing elements of those albums and a variety of musical styles as well as virtual instrument replications of culturally tinged instruments. The album garnered critical acclaim, landing on several year-end lists by publications such as PopMatters, Q, Uncut, The Guardian, and Pitchfork, and reached number 48 on the UK Albums Chart.

== Production and composition ==
Hebden produced 45 tracks over the course of ten months, and fourteen of them appear on New Energy. He initially planned it to be a minimal ambient LP, but "it came out more complex then planned," he explained. The album, apart from "Alap," "Two Thousand and Seventeen," "LA Trance," and "Daughter," departs from the glitch-y downtempo sound from his previous releases for a very uptempo, polished, listener-friendly style that's still "reflective enough to be more appropriate for home listening than club play," analyzed reviewer Paul Simpson. Despite this, elements from past Four Tet albums come together on New Energy. As writer Andy Beta stated, it has "the low-key warmth of 2003’s Rounds, the free jazz at the heart of 2005’s Everything Ecstatic, the friendly thump of 2012’s Pink," and "the sprawl of 2015’s Morning/Evening."

New Energy takes on a wide variety of styles, such as minimal bass music ("Planet"), ambient music ("Gentle Soul," "You Are Loved," and "Alap"), neo-classical music ("10 Midi"), deep house ("SW9 9SL"), new age dance music ("Lush"), Indian classical music ("Alap"), trip-hop ("Daughter"), and UK garage ("SW9 9SL"). Described by some reviewers as the album's only club track, "SW9 9SL" is named after the post code of Brixton Academy where Hebden performed at night-time events that were purely about community and people which he felt was "important." The variety also extends to the record's palette of sounds, which consists of virtual instrument replications of acoustic instruments originating from all across the world. Daniel Cole of XLR8R suggested this was an "extension of his Spotify playlist of music from Muslim countries he made earlier this year—in retaliation to the Trump travel ban."

== Release ==
Four tracks from New Energy were issued before the full album was released: "Two Thousand and Seventeen" on 4 July 2017, "Planet" on 2 August 2017, "SW9 9SL" on 25 August 2017, and "Scientists" on 13 September 2017. Text Records officially issued New Energy on 19 September 2017. Hebden contributed the first 1,000 vinyl and CD copies of New Energy to the online shop of the charitable organization Oxfam.

== Critical reception ==
Professional ratings
Aggregate scores
| Source | Rating |
|---|---|
| AnyDecentMusic? | 7.6/10 |
| Metacritic | 86/100 |
Review scores
| Source | Rating |
| AllMusic | 4/5 stars |
| Exclaim! | 9/10 |
| Financial Times | 4/5 stars |
| Louder Than War | 9/10 |
| The Observer | 3/5 stars |
| Pitchfork | 8.0/10 |
| Q | 5/5 stars |
| Resident Advisor | 3.5/5 |
| Uncut | 8/10 |
| XLR8R | 8.5/10 |

New Energy received a five-star review from Q magazine, who called it Four Tet's best album and a "career-defining masterpiece." Simpson claimed that the LP "still maintains the creativity and unpredictability that have always made [Four Tet's] work stand out." Exclaim! stated that with New Energy, "the English producer's proclivity for irresistible hooks is delivered through a palette of strummed strings, wistful timbres and delectable breaks that make for a satisfying and evocative body of work." Spin magazine's Andy Cush stated the album has "a desire to remove a listener from their surroundings and bring them someplace higher, no matter the means."

Cole stated that it "finally feels like an album that is truly unique, and characteristic of Hebden’s style." His main praise was its use of global instruments, reasoning that it "create[s] an open expanse, allowing room to breathe within the tracks, and a sense of stronger composure and musicianship on behalf of the producer." The culturally tinged instrumentation was also honored in a Dancing Astronaut review: "New Energy's serpentine instrumentation is a circuitous avoidance of sonic similarity, meditative and intricately-devised. Its tracks exude a panoptic enigma that is regenerated upon each new listen." As Uncut explained the charm of the album, "Hebden's skill is to weave such ethnographic curiosities into the fabric of his own luminous electronica without it feeling like a dry curatorial exercise."

Andrew Ryce honored it as "one of Hebden's most intimate and personal albums, with all the idiosyncrasies that come with that." He also noted that "its tranquil spirit and moments of hope make it almost transgressive at a time when other artists are channeling 2017's climate of fear and frustration into dark, angry sounds." Beta favorably reviewed the album, but also wrote that "at times, [Hebden's] attention to textures comes at the cost of exploring new terrain." Some reviews of the LP criticized the album's overly-calm, unsurprising style. However, The 405 praised the relaxed aspect of the album, reasoning that while it has its "inborn drawbacks" and the entire record "is a consolidation rather than a progression," "its palate is so substantial and nourishing that such slight ambition is peripheral." Spectrum Culture panned the record's simple structure, reasoning that it continues the aspect of Four Tet's discography where each release decreases the project's "scale, size and ambition."

== Accolades ==
| Publication | Accolade | Rank | Ref. |
|---|---|---|---|
| ABC News | 50 Best Albums of 2017 | 12 | |
| AllMusic | Best of 2017: Favorite Electronic Albums | —N/a | |
| Clash | Albums of the Year 2017 | 21 | |
| Double J | The 50 Best Albums of 2017 | 21 | |
| Drowned in Sound | Favourite Albums of 2017 | 51 | |
| Dummy | The 10 Best Albums of 2017 | 5 | |
| Entertainment Weekly | The 25 Best Albums of 2017 | 23 | |
| Exclaim! | Top 10 Dance and Electronic Albums of 2017 | 1 | |
| Fopp | The Best in 2017 | 92 | |
| The Guardian | The Best Albums of 2017 | 32 | |
| Highsnobiety | The Most Underrated Albums of 2017 | —N/a | |
| Mixmag | The Top 50 Albums of 2017 | 4 | |
| The Morning News | The Top Albums of 2017 | —N/a | |
| Piccadilly Records | End of Year Review 2017: Top 100 Albums | 67 | |
| Pitchfork | The 20 Best Electronic Albums of 2017 | 14 | |
| PopMatters | The 60 Best Albums of 2017 | 9 | |
| Q | Best of the Best: 2017 in Music | 18 | |
| Resident Advisor | 2017's Best Albums | —N/a | |
| XLR8R | Best of 2017: Releases | —N/a | |
| Uncut | Best Releases of 2017 | 36 | |

== Track listing ==
All tracks written and produced by Kieran Hebden.

| No. | Title | Length |
|---|---|---|
| 1. | "Alap" | 1:22 |
| 2. | "Two Thousand and Seventeen" | 4:12 |
| 3. | "LA Trance" | 5:47 |
| 4. | "Tremper" | 1:29 |
| 5. | "Lush" | 5:12 |
| 6. | "Scientists" | 4:59 |
| 7. | "Falls 2" | 1:12 |
| 8. | "You Are Loved" | 6:09 |
| 9. | "SW9 9SL" | 7:56 |
| 10. | "10 Midi" | 1:25 |
| 11. | "Memories" | 3:18 |
| 12. | "Daughter" | 4:55 |
| 13. | "Gentle Soul" | 1:12 |
| 14. | "Planet" | 7:19 |
| Total length: | | 56:21 |

== Personnel ==
Personnel

- Kieran Hebden – production, writing
- Tom Baker – hang on "Lush"
- Matthew Cooper – design
- Jason Evans – design, photography
- Kaitlyn Aurelia Smith – additional synthesiser programming on "LA Trance"

Software

- Ableton Live – Mixing and processing
- Omnisphere, Kontakt, Dexed, Arturia V Collection, Legowelt Juno sample kit – sound generators
- iPhone voice memos – field recording

== Charts ==
| Chart (2017) | Peak position |
|---|---|
| Dutch Albums (Album Top 100) | 167 |
| Scottish Albums (Official Charts) | 70 |
| UK Albums (Official Charts) | 48 |
| UK Dance Albums (Official Charts) | 1 |
| UK Independent Albums (Official Charts) | 9 |
| US Dance/Electronic Album Sales (Billboard) | 10 |

== Release history ==
| Region | Date | Format(s) | Label |
|---|---|---|---|
| Various | 19 September 2017 | CD; digital download; vinyl | Text |
