= Beautiful Rewind =

Studio album by Four Tet
- Released: 14 October 2013
- Genres: Electronica; trip hop; tech house; oldschool jungle; UK garage
- Length: 40:14
- Label: Text
- Producer: Kieran Hebden

Four Tet chronology
Pink (2012)	Beautiful Rewind (2013)	Morning/Evening (2015)

Beautiful Rewind is the seventh studio album by electronic musician Four Tet. It was released on 14 October 2013, by his own record label, Text Records. The song "Kool FM" appears in Grand Theft Auto V on the radio station Worldwide FM.

== Release ==
The album was announced on 22 July 2013. Kieran Hebden hinted that the release of the album would be low-key, stating on Twitter that there would be "no pre order, no youtube trailers, no itunes stream, no spotify, no amazon deal, no charts, no bit coin deal, no last minute rick rubin [referring to Rubin's enlistment by Kanye West to perform last-minute alterations to his recently released album Yeezus]."

== Reception ==
Professional ratings
Aggregate scores
Source	Rating
AnyDecentMusic?	7.4/10
Metacritic	79/100
Review scores
Source	Rating
AllMusic	4/5 stars
Fact	3.5/5
Financial Times	4/5 stars
The Irish Times	4/5 stars
The Observer	4/5 stars
Pitchfork	7.4/10
Q	4/5 stars
Resident Advisor	4.0/5
Rolling Stone	3.5/5 stars
Spin	8/10

Upon its release, Beautiful Rewind received some critical acclaim. At Metacritic, the album has received a score of 79 out of 100, based on 18 reviews, indicating "generally favorable reviews".

Killian Fox, writing for The Observer, described the album as "an (almost) unexpected pleasure". Fact magazine's Tom Lea offered the opinion that "Beautiful Rewind feels like Four Tet coming full circle" before commenting that "no matter how grubby it gets, at the heart of it will always be one fact: Four Tet's forte is making Beautiful Music." AllMusic reviewer Andy Kellman stated that "while the album does seem rather patched together with a lack of focus... there's an irrefutable charm to the restlessness." In her review for Consequence of Sound, Paula Mejia was disappointed that "the tracks don't necessarily resonate as did the memorable, emotive singles that won over listeners' hearts to begin with on catalogue highlight Rounds".

== Track listing ==
All tracks are written by Kieran Hebden.

No.	Title	Length
1.	"Gong"	3:15
2.	"Parallel Jalebi"	3:54
3.	"Our Navigation"	3:54
4.	"Ba Teaches Yoga"	3:20
5.	"Kool FM"	5:09
6.	"Crush"	2:26
7.	"Buchla"	4:12
8.	"Aerial"	5:57
9.	"Ever Never"	0:32
10.	"Unicorn"	3:31
11.	"Your Body Feels"	4:04

== Charts ==
Chart performance for Beautiful Rewind
Chart (2013)	Peak position
Belgian Albums (Ultratop Flanders)	152
UK Albums (OCC)	108
UK Dance Albums (Official Charts)	19
US Top Dance Albums (Billboard)	15
US Heatseekers Albums (Billboard)	22
