= Morning/Evening =

Studio album by Four Tet
- Released: 21 June 2015
- Recorded: August 2014 – February 2015
- Length: 40:17
- Label: Text
- Producer: Kieran Hebden

Four Tet chronology
Beautiful Rewind (2013)	Morning/Evening (2015)	New Energy (2017)

Morning/Evening is the eighth album by British electronic musician Kieran Hebden, released under his alias Four Tet in 2015 by Hebden's own Text Records and via the online music store Bandcamp. As a child, Hebden had inherited a collection of Hindu devotional music from his late grandfather but did not listen to it until his maternal grandmother died during the making of his 2013 album, Beautiful Rewind. After sampling the voice of Indian playback singer Lata Mangeshkar, Hebden was inspired to make a record with a similar structure to Indian music, particularly the raga mode and decided to break the album into a "Morning Side" and an "Evening Side". Alongside the sampled vocals, Morning/Evening contains complex drum programming, electronic sounds and manipulated found sounds.

Morning/Evening was announced in May 2015, with an expected release date of July 2015. It was made available to stream and download from Hebden's Bandcamp page on 21 June 2015 to celebrate the summer solstice. Music critics praised Hebden for continuing to release challenging and unique electronic music. The physical release of Morning/Evening became Hebden's second highest-charting album, peaking at number 48 in the UK Albums Chart.

== Recording and composition ==
Kieran Hebden, who is of Indian descent, acquired a collection of Hindu devotional music from his late grandfather when he was ten years old; however, he had never listened to it. When his maternal grandmother died during the making of his 2013 album Beautiful Rewind, Hebden played some of the records and began experimenting by looping a vocal sample of Indian playback singer Lata Mangeshkar for three days before deciding to base an album around it.

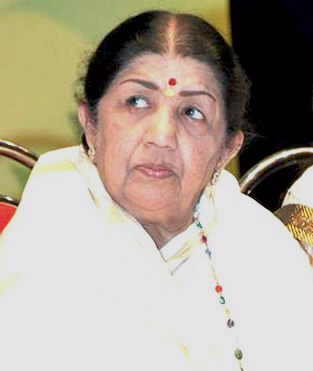
"Morning Side" samples the voice of Indian playback singer Lata Mangeshkar.

Hebden wanted to make a record with a similar structure to Indian music, particularly the raga mode, and decided to divide the album into a "Morning Side" and an "Evening Side" since many ragas relate to certain times of the day. Hebden also drew influences from English electronic music group Autechre and early electronic music, including American electronic composer Morton Subotnick's 1967 composition Silver Apples of the Moon, and wanted the album's production to sound like a low fidelity recording, while maintaining moments of high fidelity.

Morning/Evening contains two tracks of electronic sounds and "skittering" drum programming with a total running time of 40 minutes. "Morning Side" features prominent vocal samples from Mangeshkar's performance of "Main Teri Chhoti Behana Hoon", recorded for the 1983 Hindi-language feature film Souten, coupled with complex drum programming and arpeggiated synthesizers. "Evening Side", which also features a sample of filmi music, begins with guitar, drones and "sparse" keyboards. It contains a conclusion that features a garage rhythm, with Hebden wanting the end of the album to feature "the most hectic, percussive part" to emphasise an evening's relationship with nightclubs. The song fades out "to implicate that the music went to infinity." Hebden recorded the album between August 2014 and February 2015, using a laptop running the digital audio workstation Ableton Live to control VST synthesizers and manipulate found sounds.

== Release ==
Hebden announced Morning/Evening on 6 May 2015 with a release date of July 2015. Although no marketing campaign was used, Hebden performed the album for the first time at the Mayfield Depot in Manchester as part of The Warehouse Project on 17 June 2015. He decided to issue the album early, making it available to stream and download from his page at online music store Bandcamp on 21 June 2015 to celebrate the summer solstice because he thought it was "a lovely day". He included tracks from Morning/Evening in his live set at the 2015 Electric Forest Festival in Rothbury, Michigan. It was released on compact disc and vinyl on 10 July by Hebden's label, Text Records. Morning/Evening entered the UK Albums Chart during the week commencing 23 July 2015 and became Hebden's second highest-charting album, peaking at number 48.

== Reception ==
Professional ratings
Aggregate scores
Source	Rating
Metacritic	77/100
Review scores
Source	Rating
AllMusic	3/5 stars
Consequence of Sound	B
Exclaim!	9/10
NME	8/10
The Observer	4/5 stars
Pitchfork	7.7/10.0
PopMatters	8/10 stars
Resident Advisor	3.7/5
Spin	8/10
XLR8R	7/10

At Metacritic, which assigns a normalised rating out of 100 to reviews from mainstream critics, Morning/Evening received an average score of 77 based on 17 reviews, indicating "generally favorable reviews". Exclaim! reviewer Chad Barnes called it "a gorgeous, daring album", saying that "Hebden spins intricate sonic gold while subtly exploring a range of moods and moments on the complex, constantly morphing compositions". Kitty Empire, writing for The Observer, said that it was a "low key treat" that contained "effortless prettiness." Pitchfork reviewer Andy Beta called the album "daring and expansive" and said that "the scope and ambition of Morning/Evening is profound, and will hopefully inspire producers to take bigger chances and not be satisfied with pop- or club-friendly lengths." NME called "Morning Side" "one of the most moving pieces of music Hebden has ever put his name to" and said the album ranked "alongside Four Tet's very best work." Critic Nina Corcoran of Consequence of Sound said that "Hebden has done what he does best: create an atmosphere so encompassing that you lose sight of wherever you are while you're listening". Spin's Dan Weiss called the album "ambitious" and "beautiful in its own right, if you’re patient."

In his review for PopMatters, Casey Hardmeyer called the album both "classic Four Tet" and "a step in a new direction for the veteran producer". Hardmeyer felt the vocal sample on "Morning Side" was too prominent in the mix, saying that "Side two, 'Evening Side', is where Hebden really shines", and praised Hebden for continuing to release challenging and unique music "in an electronica landscape that's increasingly devoid of it". XLR8R's Chas Reynolds said that while the album's "narrative ambivalence" might not make Morning/Evening Hebden's most "immediate" record, it lent Morning/Evening a "near infinite replay value". AllMusic's Andy Kellman said that the album "isn't among the most substantive Four Tet albums, but it does reward repeated casual listening." Angus Finlayson, reviewing the album for Resident Advisor, called the album "the prettiest Four Tet record in some time" and said that "in its best moments, Morning/Evening is perfectly paced." Finlayson highlighted the "vagueness" of the record's "disparate material" but concluded that "even with these faults [...] Hebden has brought a refreshing addition to his discography."

== Track listing ==
All tracks are written by Kieran Hebden

No.	Title	Length
1.	"Morning Side"	20:24
2.	"Evening Side"	19:53

== Personnel ==
Credits are adapted from the album's liner notes.

- Kieran Hebden – music, production

Additional personnel

- Matt Cooper – design
- Jason Evans – photography, design

== Charts ==
Chart (2015)	Peak position
Belgian Albums (Ultratop Flanders)	94
Belgian Albums (Ultratop Wallonia)	159
Scottish Albums (Official Charts)	57
UK Albums (Official Charts)	48
UK Album Downloads (Official Charts)	83
UK Dance Albums (Official Charts)	15
UK Independent Albums (Official Charts)	7
UK Vinyl Albums (OCC)	1
US Top Dance Albums (Billboard)	23
