= Remixes (Four Tet album) =

Remix album by Four Tet
- Released: 25 September 2006
- Genre: Electronic
- Length: 75:45 (disc 1); 52:47 (disc 2); 128:32 (total)
- Labels: Domino Records, WIG180 (UK) / DNO124 (US)
- Producer: Kieran Hebden

Four Tet chronology
Everything Ecstatic (2005)	Remixes (2006)	Ringer (2008)

Professional ratings
Review scores
Source	Rating
Almost Cool	(6.5/10)
The Guardian	4/5 stars
MusicOMH	4/5 stars
Pitchfork	(6.8/10)
Tiny Mix Tapes	4/5 stars

Remixes is a two-disc compilation of Four Tet remixes. It was released on 25 September 2006. The first disc contains twelve Four Tet remixes selected by Hebden, while the second disc comprises every official remix to date (both by himself and by other artists) of Four Tet tracks. Many of the tracks included in this compilation had previously been available on vinyl only.

== Track listing ==
=== Disc One: Remixes ===
No.	Title	Original artist	Length
1.	"Tics" (Four Tet remix)	Lars Horntveth	6:42
2.	"Skttrbrain" (Four Tet remix)	Radiohead	4:32
3.	"Money Folder" (Four Tet remix)	Madvillain	2:50
4.	"One Year" (Four Tet remix)	His Name Is Alive	6:02
5.	"Breathe Me" (Four Tet remix)	Sia	5:06
6.	"Untitled [SAW2 CD1 Track1]" (Four Tet remix)	Aphex Twin	7:04
7.	"Great Day" (Four Tet remix)	Madvillain	2:45
8.	"Pick Up" (Four Tet remix)	Bonobo	7:15
9.	"Roads Become Rivers (Rivers Become Oceans)" (Four Tet remix)	Rothko	7:52
10.	"Carmella" (Four Tet remix)	Beth Orton	11:46
11.	"So Here We Are" (Four Tet remix)	Bloc Party	6:31
12.	"Heim" (Four Tet remix)	Pole	7:19

=== Disc Two: Remixed ===
No.	Title	Length
1.	"A Joy" (featuring Percee P)	2:59
2.	"As Serious as Your Life" (Jay Dee remix)	4:48
3.	"Hilarious Movie of the 90s" (Manitoba remix)	5:40
4.	"Hilarious Movie of the 90s" (Koushik's Funny Flic)	2:39
5.	"A Joy" (remix)	3:12
6.	"My Angel Rocks back and Forth" (Icarus remix)	7:21
7.	"A Joy" (Battles remix)	4:04
8.	"As Serious as Your Life" (remix)	3:51
9.	"A Joy" (featuring Percee P – Koushik's quick mix)	1:39
10.	"Sun Drums and Soil" (Sa-Ra Creative Partners remix)	5:59
11.	"First Thing/Chia" (Isambard Khroustaliov remix)	5:29
12.	"No More Mosquitoes" (Boom Bip remix)	5:04
