= FabricLive.60 =

Compilation album by FabricLive
- Released: November 2011
- Label: Fabric
- Producer: Brodinski

FabricLive chronology
FabricLive.59 (2011)	FabricLive.60 (2011)	FabricLive.61 (2012)

FabricLive.60 is a 2011 DJ mix album by Brodinski. The album was released as part of the FabricLive Mix Series.

== Track listing ==
1. Bicep - Silk - Throne Of Blood
2. Low Jack - Slow Dance - unreleased
3. Tomas Barfod - Beach Party - FOF
4. Harkin & Raney - Workin & Steamin - Throne Of Blood
5. Clement Meyer - Fire In Vitro - Correspondant
6. Axel Boman - Purple Drank - Pampa
7. Woodkid - Iron (Gucci Vump Remix) - Green United Music
8. Renaissance Man - Stalker Humanoid - Turbo
9. T. Williams - Heartbeat (Paul Woolford Remix) - Local Action
10. John Roman - Petrified - unreleased
11. TWR72 - Paradox - Sound Pellegrino
12. Sian - Tropical Sci Fi (Sam Paganini Remix) - Octopus
13. Samuel L. Session feat. Paris The Black Fu - Hype-Nosis - Detelefunk
14. Rejected - For The People (DVS1 For No One Mix) - Rejected
15. Sigha - HF029A1 - Hotflush
16. Samuel L. Session - The Soloist (Reboot Remix) - Be As One
17. Gingy & Bordello - Body Acid (KiNK's On Acid Remix) - Twin Turbo
18. Gesaffelstein - Control Movement - Bromance
19. Switch feat. Andrea Martin - I Still Love You - Dubsided
20. Instra:mental - Pyramid - 3024
21. Glass Figure - Brightside Of House - Satellite Of Love
22. Riton feat. Shani Cuppcake - Dark Place - Ritontime
23. Objekt - CLK Recovery - Objekt
