= Parallel (Four Tet album) =

Studio album by Four Tet
- Released: 25 December 2020
- Genre: Ambient house
- Length: 70:14
- Label: Text
- Producer: Kieran Hebden

Four Tet chronology
Sixteen Oceans (2020)	Parallel (2020)	Three (2024)

Professional ratings
Review scores
Source	Rating
The Observer	4/5 stars
Pitchfork	7.7/10

Parallel is the eleventh studio album by British electronic musician Four Tet, released on 25 December 2020 by Text Records. It was released the day after 871, issued under Hebden's 00110100 01010100 alias, which collects material produced from 1995 to 1997. Several tracks on the album had been previously released by Four Tet on Bandcamp, Apple Music, and Spotify under the alternate alias of ⣎⡇ꉺლ༽இ•̛)ྀ◞ ༎ຶ ༽ৣৢ؞ৢ؞ؖ ꉺლ.

== Track listing ==
All tracks are written by Kieran Hebden.

No.	Title	Length
1.	"Parallel 1"	26:46
2.	"Parallel 2"	6:04
3.	"Parallel 3"	0:48
4.	"Parallel 4"	4:47
5.	"Parallel 5"	0:53
6.	"Parallel 6"	5:06
7.	"Parallel 7"	5:43
8.	"Parallel 8"	6:21
9.	"Parallel 9"	7:15
10.	"Parallel 10"	6:31
Total length:		70:14
