= Symposium (band) =

English punk pop band

- Origin: London, England
- Genres: Punk rock, Britpop
- Years active: 1994–2000, 2022—present
- Label: Infectious Records
- Spinoffs: Hell Is for Heroes
- Members: Ross Cummins; Joe Birch; William McGonagle; Hagop Tchaparian; Wojtek Godzisz

Symposium are an English rock band. They were initially active from 1994 to 2000 and were known for their energetic live shows. The name 'Symposium' originally referred to a drinking party (the Greek verb sympotein means "to drink together"), and was taken from the philosophical dialogue by Plato. The band reformed in 2022.

== History ==
The band formed whilst still at school in Shepherd's Bush, London, in 1994. The lineup consisted of Ross Cummins on vocals, Hagop Tchaparian as a guitarist and backing vocalist, Joe Birch on drums, William McGonagle as a guitarist, and Wojtek Godzisz as a vocalist and songwriter. The band's first show was at Hammersmith's Emerald Hut in July 1994, and they played various clubs and pubs in Camden Town throughout 1995; by November, they had obtained a manager. The band had a selection of uptempo punk pop songs which, together with their young average age of eighteen, brought them to the attention of Korda Marshall, who signed them to Infectious Records in 1996.

Their 1996 debut single, "Drink the Sunshine", was followed by support from NME, who placed them on the "Bratbus Tour" (an annual tour of four hotly tipped bands) which would visit universities in the UK. In March 1997, the band's concerts had been noted by Everett True, who put them on the cover of the 29 March 1997 Melody Maker, proclaiming them to be the "best live band in Britain". The band released a No. 25 UK hit single, "Farewell to Twilight" in March 1997. They also performed the song live on TFI Friday. This was followed by a headlining tour.

They released a mini album, One Day at a Time, in October 1997, stating in NME that they "just wanted to get them [the songs] out there". The release alluded to the fact that their actual (full-length) debut album would be released at a later date. This was illustrated by the fact that one of the four singles they had released up until this point, "The Answer To Why I Hate You", was absent from the mini-album, but did appear on their first album On the Outside. Having signed a recording contract with Infectious Records. "Farewell to Twilight" achieved a UK Singles Chart peak of No. 25, a position that they would never surpass.

"Fairweather Friend" was the band's best known song, having support from a music video, and this led to a Top of the Pops performance. In 1997 the band supported a number of popular American bands, including Red Hot Chili Peppers at Wembley Arena, The Foo Fighters, Deftones and No Doubt at Brixton Academy, where Cummins dislocated his leg. The following year the band toured the United States on the Warped Tour with Bad Religion, NOFX and Rancid.

Their debut album On the Outside was released in May 1998. By the end of 1999 the band had left Infectious Records.

After supporting Metallica at the Milton Keynes Bowl in 1999, Symposium released the standalone single "Killing Position", which saw a change of musical direction into post-hardcore but only charted at No. 176 and would become their final canonical release. By early 2000 the band had developed musical differences and broke up. McGonagle and Birch formed the post-hardcore band Hell Is for Heroes.

Wojtek Godzisz went solo and signed to Tigertrap Records in 2006. His eponymous debut album was released in 2009.

Hagop Tchaparian went on to work with the band Hot Chip. He is a consultant to the music industry. Tchaparian released his debut album Bolts in October 2022.

== 2022 onwards ==
On 22 April 2022, an update was posted on Symposium's Facebook page. The band announced that their albums (One Day at a Time and On the Outside) were now available on all streaming websites, with a compilation album Do You Remember How It Was? due out on 11 November 2022. Ross, Wojtek, Will and Joe were to participate in a Q&A at Signature Brew in Haggerston on 19 May 2022, hosted by Kerrangs!'s Phil Alexander. There was also the promise of a live show announcement coming soon. It was later announced that Symposium would play for one night only at Islington Assembly Hall in November 2022.

In 2023 the band played two sold-out shows, at Manchester Academy on 16 November and London's Electric Ballroom on 18 November.

== Members ==
- Ross Cummins – vocals
- Wojtek Godzisz – vocals, bass
- Hagop Tchaparian – guitar, occasional backing vocals
- William McGonagle – guitar
- Joe Birch – drums

== Discography ==
=== Albums and EPs ===
Info	Track listing
One Day at a Time; 8-track mini-album Year:1997; Format: CD / 12"; Label: Infectious Records; UK Albums Chart Position: No. 29: Tracks 1 - 5 & 7 produced by Clive Langer and Alan Winstanley.; Track 6 produced by Symposium and Matt Gregory.; Track 8 produced by Clive Martin.	"Drink The Sunshine"; "One Day at a Time"; "Farewell To Twilight"; "Puddles"; "Fairweather Friend"; "Fear of Flying"; "Fizzy"; "Smiling"
On the Outside; Year: 1998; Format: CD / 12" / Cassette; Label: Infectious; UK Albums Chart Position: No. 32: Produced by Martin "Youth" Glover.	UK Track listing; "Impossible" – 3:25; "The Answer to Why I Hate You" – 3:31; "Bury You" – 3:36; "Blue" – 5:15; "The End" – 4:48; "Nothing Special" – 5:07; "Circles, Squares and Lines" – 3:40; "Stay on the Outside" – 3:35; "Paint the Stars" – 4:28; "Obsessive Compulsive Disorder" – 3:04; "Natural" – 5:03; "Way" – 11:05; "Disappear" – 3:44 (hidden track)
On the BBC; Live Compilation; Year: 1999; Format: CD; Label: Strange Fruit: Track 1 recorded at Newcastle Uni (28/10/98); Track 2 recorded at Reading Festival (28/8/98); Tracks 3 & 4 recorded at the BBC (11/9/96); Tracks 5 & 7 recorded at T in the Park (12/7/98); Track 6 recorded at Music Live Manchester (22/5/97); Track 8 recorded at Top of the Pops (28/8/97); Tracks 9 – 11 recorded at T in the Park (12/7/97)	"What's What"; "The Answer To Why I Hate You"; "Bury You"; "Farewell To Twilight"; "Puddle"; "Smiling"; "Fizzy"; "Fairweather Friend"; "Disappear"; "Untitled"; "Hard Day's Night"

=== Singles ===
Year	Title	Album	UK Singles Chart
1996	"Drink the Sunshine"	One Day at a Time	94
1997	"Farewell to Twilight"	One Day at a Time	25
1997	"The Answer to Why I Hate You"	On the Outside	32
1997	"Fairweather Friend"	One Day at a Time	25
1997	"Drink the Sunshine" / "Fizzy" (Limited)	One Day at a Time	89
1998	"Average Man"	—	45
1998	"Bury You"	On the Outside	41
1998	"Blue"	On the Outside	48
1999	"Killing Position"	—	176
