= Hagop Tchaparian =

British-Armenian musician

- Born: Hagop Simon Tchaparian; 1978 (age 47–48); Fulham, London, England
- Genres: Folktronica; techno
- Years active: 1994–present
- Label: Text Records
- Formerly of: Symposium

Hagop Simon Tchaparian (born 1978) is a British-Armenian musician, who released his debut album, Bolts, on Text Records in 2022. Tchaparian had previously been guitarist for the British pop-punk band Symposium and worked as a tour manager for Hot Chip and Four Tet. Hot Chip named a track after him on their 2006 album The Warning. In 2025 he released Kino EP, a collaboration with DJ and producer, Anish Kumar.

== Early life ==
Tchaparian was born in Fulham, West London to an Armenian father and an English mother who ran a café together. His father Movses had been forced to flee as a child from Musa Dagh to Anjar in 1939 and moved to London at 18.

== Discography ==
- Bolts (2022, Text Records)
