= One Little Plane =

American singer (born 1952)

- Born: Kathryn Bint
- Origin: Chicago
- Genres: Folk
- Years active: 2008–present
- Label: Text Records

One Little Plane is folk artist Kathryn Bint. Hailing from Chicago, Bint's music has been described as "gently wistful, dust-kicking psychedelia" and "dreamy heart warming folk" with "simple, heartfelt melodies". One Little Plane's debut album, Until (2008), featured production from Kieran Hebden. Hebden also produced the follow-up, Into the Trees (2012).

== Discography ==
=== Albums ===
- Until (2008)
- Into the Trees (2012)

=== Singles ===
- "She Was Out in the Water" (2012)
