= Wingdings (album) =

2026 studio album by Kieran Hebden

ʅ͡(̸̢̛̼)̸͚͛:̴͓̑:̸͎̂ ҉ ͡ ͞ ͞ ͞ ҉● ࿀ ● ࿀ ● ҉⃝ ⃝͢ ͞ ͘ ͞⃝̕ ͢ ̛ ⃝ ̸ ̡ ͢⃝̧ ͡ ͡ ̀ ̧ ̢⃝͜ ҉ ͞ ͞ ⃝͞ ͘ ͞ ͡⃝ ⃝҉҈҉҈҉҈҉҈҉҈҉ :̶̢͙͆(̷̮͂)̵̳̊( ҈͜͢ͅ l̡ ̡͌ Ɵʅ͡(̸̢

Studio album by ⣎⡇ꉺლ༽இ•̛)ྀ◞ ༎ຶ ༽ৣৢ؞ৢ؞ؖ ꉺლ
- Released: June 12, 2026
- Genre: Electronic
- Length: 37:11
- Label: Text
- Producer: Kieran Hebden

ʅ͡(̸̢̛̼)̸͚͛:̴͓̑:̸͎̂ ҉ ͡ ͞ ͞ ͞ ҉● ࿀ ● ࿀ ● ҉⃝ ⃝͢ ͞ ͘ ͞⃝̕ ͢ ̛ ⃝ ̸ ̡ ͢⃝̧ ͡ ͡ ̀ ̧ ̢⃝͜ ҉ ͞ ͞ ⃝͞ ͘ ͞ ͡⃝ ⃝҉҈҉҈҉҈҉҈҉҈҉ :̶̢͙͆(̷̮͂)̵̳̊( ҈͜͢ͅ l̡ ̡͌ Ɵʅ͡(̸̢, also known as Wingdings, is the debut studio album by the English musician Kieran Hebden under the alias ⣎⡇ꉺლ༽இ•̛)ྀ◞ ༎ຶ ༽ৣৢ؞ৢ؞ؖ ꉺლ, known colloquially as "Wingdings". It was surprise released by Text Records as a limited vinyl on June 12, 2026, before being released on streaming services on July 3, 2026. (Note: The label is listed on streaming services as ҉҈҉҈҉҈҉҈҉҈҉⃝ ҉.)

== Background and release ==
In 2017, Kieran Hebden, known as Four Tet, began releasing music under the alias ⣎⡇ꉺლ༽இ•̛)ྀ◞ ༎ຶ ༽ৣৢ؞ৢ؞ؖ ꉺლ, colloquially referred to as "Wingdings". The project serves as a companion to a 192-hour Spotify playlist that he created with a similar name; both it and the alias △▃△▓ were originally used to release tracks that could only be found in the playlist.

The album was released through Text as a vinyl limited to 2000 copies on June 12, 2026. It was released on streaming services on July 3, 2026. Many of its tracks were previously released as singles under different names; three tracks come from a previously released extended play (EP). The unconventional names given to the album and its tracks broke iTunes for people attempting to import the albums from Bandcamp; the album is also broken on the music website Last.fm. Some tracks have previously appeared in DJ sets played by Hebden; track 5 appeared in a Boiler Room set from Fred Again with the title "Feelings" (Note: Boiler Room does not provide a track name.) under the alias KH.

== Music ==
The album, as described by The Verge, is more dance-focused than Hebden's other works. Tracks also build up to an "ecstatic and spiritual" climax with deeper textures. The synth of track one resembles the tone of an Indian tiger. Track two features house groove with harp synths. Track three has an uneven rhythm similar to dubstep. Track four features fast-moving hi-hat rhythm with bitcrushed sounds. Track five, which samples "I'm a Slave 4 U", captures the appeal of contemporary UK house. Track six is reminiscent of 90s IDM musicians like Arovane.

== Critical reception ==
Professional ratings
Review scores
Source	Rating
Pitchfork	8.0/10

The album received critical acclaim upon release. Pitchfork writer Philip Sherburne called the album "the summation of decades of Hebden's work", going on to praise several of its tracks. The Verge editor Terrence O'Brien described it as a "celebration", calling the tracks "undeniable, infectious, and highly polished" in spite of Hebden's method of releasing the album.

== Track listing ==
All tracks are written by ⣎⡇ꉺლ༽இ•̛)ྀ◞ ༎ຶ ༽ৣৢ؞ৢ؞ؖ ꉺლ.

No.	Title	Length
1.	"(̸̢̛̼̞̭͋ͅ)̸͚̰͛̔̾̀̿͒͂v̴̢͚͚͎ȯ̶̞̮͖̑̈́OOOOOOooo☼⃝☼⃝◉࿃ूੂ࿃ूੂੂ ʅ͡͡͡͡͡͡͡͡͡͡͡()ʃ͡͡͡͡͡͡͡͡͡͡ ꐑ(ఠీੂȯ̶̞̮͖̑̈́̿)̸̳̥̰̜̥̺̐ͅ࿃ूੂ✧⃛✧⃛)̴͎̜͍̱̋̌͋̓̾̚͜ ̷̨̢̥̅͝ͅ(̸̢̛̼̞̭͋ͅ)̸͚̰͛̔̾̀̿͒͂:̴͓̞̑̌̂̆̊͋̀:̸͎̟̯̂̓̌:̶̢͙͙͕̠̩͆(̷̮͍͚̫͚͂"	5:37
2.	"༼༭ຶཬɷԾㅍㅍ)აِّّْٕٔٓٓ ˓˚✧₊⁎❝᷀ົཽ*ೃ:(꒡͡ ❝᷀ົཽ ꉺლ༽:̸͎̟̯̂̓̌:̶̢͙͙͕̠̩͆(̷̮͍͚̫͚͂̍)̵̳̗̊( ̟̞̝̜̙̘̗̖҉̵̴̨̧̢̡̼̻̺̹̳̲̱̰̯̮̭̬̫̪̩̦̥̤̣̠҈͈͇͉͍͎͓͔͕͖͙͚͜͢͢͢͢͢͢͢͢͢͢͢͢͢͢ͅ l̡̡̡ ̡͌ Ɵʅ͡͡͡͡͡͡͡͡͡͡͡(̸̢̛̼̞̭͋ͅ)̸͚̰͛̔̾̀̿͒͂v̴̢͚͚͎ȯ̶̞̮͖̑̈́)̸̳̥̰̜̥̺̐ͅ)̴͎̜͍̱̋̌͋̓̾̚ ̷̨ ☼⃝◞⊖◟ ∷፨◉☼⃝◞⊖◟☼⃝ꉂꆭ(☼⃝❁)ᕗ ҉⃝ ʅ͡͡͡͡͡͡͡͡͡͡͡ ̟̞̝̜̙̘̗̖҉̵̴̨̧̢̡̼̻̺̹̳̲̱̰̯̮̭̬̫̪̩̦̥̤̣"	6:03
3.	"☼⃝☼ ⃝͢ ̢⃝͜ ☼⃝☼⃝:̴͓̞̑̌̂̆̊͋̀:̸͎̟̯̂̓̌:̶̢͙͙͕̠̩͆(̷̮͍͚̫͚͂̍)̵̳̗̊(ㅍ◟ㅍ)აِّّْٕٔٓٓ ˓˚✧₊⁎❝᷀ົཽ*ೃ:(꒡͡ ❝᷀ົཽ ꉺლ༽༼இ•̛)ྀ◞ ༎ຶ ̟̞̝̜̙̘̗̖҉̵̴̨̧̢̡̼̻̺̹̳̲̱̰̯̮̭̬̫̪̩̦̥̤̣̠҈͈͇͉͍͎͓͔͕͖͙͚͜͢͢͢͢͢͢͢͢͢͢͢͢͢͢ͅ ⦁ ⦁ ⦁ ༽ৣৢ؞ৢ؞ؖ ཥ•̫͡•ཤꉺ༽♡(•ི̛ᴗ͇ˊ̑⁾ ἴृ ⁽(༽۩۪؞ءؙۜؖۛ ّّٕٓٔٓٙٓ͡༼Ծɷ༼(⁽*(ू•‧̫"	3:56
4.	"☼⃝☼⃝◉ ҉⃝O☼⃝⊖☼⃝☼⃝❁ ҉⃝☼⃝☼⃝ ⃝͢ ̢⃝͜ ☼⃝☼⃝:̴͓̞̑̌̂̆̊͋̀:̸͎̟̯̂̓̌:̶̢͙͙͕̠̩͆(̷̮͍͚̫͚͂̍)̵̳̗̊( ̟̞̝̜̙̘̗̖҉̵̴̨̧̢̡̼̻̺̹̳̲̱̰̯̮̭̬̫̪̩̦̥̤̣̠҈͈͇͉͍͎͓͔͕͖͙͚͜͢͢͢͢͢͢͢͢͢͢͢͢͢͢ͅ l̡̡̡ ̡͌ Ɵʅ͡͡͡͡͡͡͡͡͡͡͡(̸̢̛̼̞̭͋ͅ)̸͚̰͛̔̾̀̿͒͂v̴̢͚͚͎ȯ̶̞̮͖̑̈́)̸̳̥̰̜̥̺̐ͅ"	4:21
5.	"☼⃝☼⃝◉ ҉⃝O◉◖ƪ⊁◞..◟⊀ ̟̞̝̜̙̘̗̖҉̵̴̨̧̢̡̼̻̺̹̳̲̱̰̯̮̭̬̫̪̩̦̥̤̣̠҈͈͇͉͍͎͓͔͕͖͙͚͜͢͢͢͢͢͢͢͢͢͢͢͢͢͢ͅ ⦁ ⦁ ⦁ ❍|◗щ (*ㅇ△ Φ☆)ノ☼⃝⊖☼⃝☼⃝❁ ҉⃝☼⃝☼⃝ ⃝͢ ̢⃝͜ ☼⃝☼⃝______oOo___________+-_.:._-*”+-_.:._-*"+-_.:._-*"+-_.:._-*"+-_.:._-*"+-_.:"	4:33
6.	"° *¸.·* ´¨・*・ . °。·´¨´゜࿃ूੂ✧⃛✧⃛:̸͎̟̯̂̓̌:̶̢͙͙͕̠̩͆(̷̮͍͚̫͚͂̍)̵̳̗̊( ̟̞̝̜̙̘̗̖҉̵̴̨̧̢̡̼̻̺̹̳̲̱̰̯̮̭̬̫̪̩̦̥̤̣̠҈͈͇͉͍͎͓͔͕͖͙͚͜͢͢͢͢͢͢͢͢͢͢͢͢͢͢ͅ l̡̡̡ ̡͌ *´¨ ⃝͢ ∷፨◉☼⃝◞⊖◟☼⃝ ⃝͢ ∷፨◉☼⃝◞⊖◟☼⃝ ⃝͢ ∷፨◉☼⃝◞⊖◟☼⃝ ⃝͢ ∷፨◉☼⃝◞⊖◟☼⃝ ⃝͢ ∷፨◉☼⃝◞⊖◟☼⃝ ⃝͢ ∷፨◉☼⃝◞⊖◟☼⃝ ⃝͢ ∷፨◉☼⃝◞⊖◟☼⃝ ⃝͢ ∷፨◉☼⃝◞⊖◟☼⃝ ⃝͢ ∷፨◉☼⃝◞⊖◟☼⃝ ⃝͢ ∷፨◉☼⃝◞⊖◟☼⃝ ⃝͢ ∷፨◉☼⃝◞⊖◟☼⃝ "	3:33
7.	"Ɵʅ͡͡͡͡͡͡͡͡͡͡͡(̸̢̛̼̞̭͋ͅ)̸͚̰͛̔̾̀̿͒͂v̴̢͚͚͎ȯ̶̞̮͖̑̈́)̸̳̥̰̜̥̺̐ͅ)̴͎̜͍̱̋̌͋̓̾̚ ̷̨ ☼⃝◞⊖◟ ʅ͡͡͡͡͡͡͡͡͡͡͡(̸̢̛̼̞̭͋ͅ)̸͚̰͛̔̾̀̿͒͂ȯ̶̞̮͖̑̈́)̸̳̥̰̜̥̺̐ͅv̴̢͚͚͎͎̞͒͊̎ȯ̶̞̮͖̑̈́̿)̸̳̥̰̜̥̺̐ͅ)̴͎̜͍̱̋̌͋̓̾̚͜ ̷̨̢̥̅͝ͅ(̸̢̛̼̞̭͋ͅ)̸͚̰͛̔̾̀̿͒͂:̴͓̞̑̌̂̆̊͋̀:̸͎̟̯̂̓̌:̶̢͙͙͕̠̩͆(̷̮͍͚̫͚͂̍̒̋̕)̵̳̗̊̍̽́ ̵͍̪̲̀̍ ̴̤̚ ̴̹̙͙̻̓̉̚͝V̸̘̅̀̒̃̚V̴̠̼̩̘͈̦̥̉͋̐͗͌͠V̵̪̮̅̉̓"	5:37
8.	" ҉ ҉ ͡ ͞ ҉ ͡ ͞ ͞ ͞ ҉● ࿀ ● ࿀ ● ҉⃝ ⃝͢ ͞ ͘ ͞⃝̕ ͢ ̛ ⃝ ̸ ̡ ͢⃝̧ ͡ ͡ ̀ ̧ ̢⃝͜ ҉ ͞ ͞ ⃝͞ ͘ ͞ ͡⃝ ⃝҉҈҉҈҉҈҉҈҉҈҉ ͞ ͞ ҉● ࿀ ● ࿀ ● ҉⃝ ⃝͢ ͞ ͘ ͞⃝̕ ͢ ̛ ⃝ ̸ ̡ ͢⃝̧ ͡ ͡ ̀ ̧ ̢⃝͜ ҉ ͞ ͞ ⃝͞ ͘ ͞ ͡⃝ ⃝҉҈҉҈҉҈҉҈҉҈҉ ͡ ͞ ͞ ͞ ҉ ҉ ͡ ͞ ͞ ͞ ҉● ࿀ ● ࿀ ● ҉⃝ ⃝͢ ͞ "	3:28
Total length:		37:11

== See also ==
- Zalgo text – Digital text modified to appear frightening or glitchy
