= FabricLive.59 =

Compilation album by FabricLive
- Released: September 2011
- Genre: outsider house
- Label: Fabric
- Producer: Four Tet

FabricLive chronology
FabricLive.58 (2011)	FabricLive.59 (2011)	FabricLive.60 (2011)

Professional ratings
Review scores
Source	Rating
AllMusic	4/5 stars
The Guardian	3/5 stars
Pitchfork	8/10

FabricLive.59 is a 2011 DJ mix album by Four Tet. The album was released as part of the FabricLive Mix Series. Hebden's two previous mix albums, for the DJ-KiCKS and Late Night Tales series, contained many different genres of music, but FabricLive.59 featured only electronic dance music, heavily slanted towards UK Garage. Hebden also used field recordings made at the club as part of the mix.

== Track listing ==
No.	Title	Writer(s)	Record Label	Length
1.	"Intro"	Four Tet		0:55
2.	"Immersion Partielle"	Michel Redolfi	GRM	1:05
3.	"First Born"	Crazy Bald Heads	On-Tick	2:46
4.	"Feel Da Vibe"	Persian	Same People	2:38
5.	"101112"	KH	unreleased	2:46
6.	"Pulse X"	Youngstar (Musical Mob)	Inspired Sounds	1:45
7.	"First Born" (Four Tet Remix)	Crazy Bald Heads	unreleased	4:33
8.	"Sais" (Dub)	Floating Points	Eglo	2:54
9.	"Mr Bean"	Apple	Appsolute	2:17
10.	"Webers"	Caribou	Leaf	1:10
11.	"Flav" (Urban Myths Remix)	Big Bird	Nice n Ripe	0:54
12.	"Waiting"	Genius	Kronik	2:37
13.	"fabric"	Four Tet	unreleased	1:32
14.	"The Continuing Story Of Counterpoint, Part Nine"	David Borden	David Borden	1:56
15.	"Dark Energy"	STL	Something	5:28
16.	"Percussions One"	Percussions	unreleased	1:57
17.	"Angie's Fucked"	C++	Music For Freaks	2:47
18.	"Street Halo"	Burial	Hyperdub	5:15
19.	"Cape Fear"	KMA	KMA	1:53
20.	"Higher Power"	WK7	Power House	2:01
21.	"Sieso"	Ricardo Villalobos	Cadenza	1:45
22.	"Pyramid"	Four Tet	Text	7:31
23.	"How I Program"	Red Rack'em	Bergerac	0:47
24.	"Hobson's Choice" (Tune For Da Man Dem)	Active Minds	white	5:13
25.	"Blackholes"	Aramando Gallop & Steve Poindexter	Muzique	1:23
26.	"Outro"	Four Tet		0:58
27.	"Locked"	Four Tet	Text	8:31
