= 0181 (album) =

Studio album by 00110100 01010100
- Released: 15 January 2013
- Recorded: 1997–2001
- Genre: Electronic
- Length: 38:08
- Label: Text Records
- Producer: Kieran Hebden

00110100 01010100 chronology
| 0181 (2013) | 871 (2020) |

Professional ratings
Review scores
| Source | Rating |
|---|---|
| Bearded | (favourable) |
| Consequence of Sound | 4/5 stars |
| Pitchfork | (7.3/10.0) |
| Resident Advisor | (3.5/5) |

0181 is an album by Four Tet, under his alias 00110100 01010100, released by Text Records in January 2013. Comprising non-album tracks that were recorded between 1997 and 2001, Kieran Hebden announced the release of the album on the morning of its release via his Twitter and Facebook pages.

0181's name is a pre-2000 area code for London, where Hebden grew up.

== Track listing ==
All tracks are written by Kieran Hebden.

| No. | Title | Length |
|---|---|---|
| 1. | "0181 000 0001" | 1:03 |
| 2. | "0181 000 0002" | 2:19 |
| 3. | "0181 000 0003" | 4:05 |
| 4. | "0181 000 0004" | 1:56 |
| 5. | "0181 000 0005" | 3:30 |
| 6. | "0181 000 0006" | 0:49 |
| 7. | "0181 000 0007" | 2:47 |
| 8. | "0181 000 0008" | 1:57 |
| 9. | "0181 000 0009" | 1:14 |
| 10. | "0181 000 0010" | 3:42 |
| 11. | "0181 000 0011" | 0:42 |
| 12. | "0181 000 0012" | 2:21 |
| 13. | "0181 000 0013" | 0:55 |
| 14. | "0181 000 0014" | 3:21 |
| 15. | "0181 000 0015" | 1:13 |
| 16. | "0181 000 0016" | 6:08 |

== See also ==
- 871
