= Ringer (EP) =

EP by Four Tet
- Released: 21 April 2008
- Genre: Electronic
- Length: 31:29
- Label: Domino Records
- Producer: Kieran Hebden

Four Tet chronology
Remixes (2006)	Ringer (2008)	There Is Love in You (2010)

Professional ratings
Review scores
Source	Rating
AllMusic	link
The Independent	link
musicOMH.com	link
Pitchfork	7.4/10
PopMatters.com	link
Twisted Ear	link

Ringer is an EP by Kieran Hebden under the name Four Tet. It was released on 21 April 2008 in the UK and on 6 May 2008 in North America. It is Hebden's first major release of original solo material since 2005's Everything Ecstatic Part 2.

== Track listing ==
No.	Title	Length
1.	"Ringer"	9:58
2.	"Ribbons"	5:21
3.	"Swimmer"	8:43
4.	"Wing Body Wing"	7:27

== 2026 Remaster ==
In August 2026, Four Tet announced a re-released and remastered version of Ringer. The new version contains two tracks from the era, Trancer and Moma, the latter previously unreleased.

No.	Title	Length
1.	"Ringer"	9:58
2.	"Trancer"	Unknown
3.	"Ribbons"	5:21
4.	"Swimmer"	8:43
5.	"Moma" (Previously released on the 'We are the Works' charity compilation, and then on Four Tet's own 'Randoms' release in 2016.)	4:45
6.	"Wing Body Wing"	7:27
