= Taraval =

Taraval is a surname. Notable people with the surname include:

- Guillaume Taraval (1701–1750), Franco-Swedish painter
- Hugues Taraval (1715–1785), French painter
- Sigismundo Taraval (1700–1763), Italian Jesuit missionary

== Transportation ==
- Taraval Line
