= Late Night Tales: Four Tet =

Compilation album by Four Tet
- Released: 4 October 2004
- Genre: Electronic
- Length: 74:20
- Label: Azuli
- Producer: Four Tet

Four Tet chronology
My Angel Rocks Back and Forth (EP) (2004)	Late Night Tales: Four Tet (2004)	Everything Ecstatic (2005)

Late Night Tales chronology
Turin Brakes (2004)	Four Tet (2004)	Flaming Lips (2005)

Late Night Tales: Four Tet is a DJ mix album compiled by Kieran Hebden, who goes by the pseudonym Four Tet. It is part of the Late Night Tales/Another Late Night compilation series.

== Track listing ==
1. "Haunted Feelings" – 2:21 – Rahsaan Roland Kirk
2. "Battle Rhymes for Battle Times" – 2:37 – Koushik
3. "Wiggy" (Edit) – 0:32 – Hal Blaine
4. "One Way Glass" – 3:37 – Manfred Mann Chapter Three
5. "Music for the Gift" (part 2) – 1:52 – Terry Riley
6. "January V" – 3:18 – Max Roach
7. "Why We Fight" – 4:08 – Tortoise
8. "2 Cups of Blood" – 1:24 – Gravediggaz
9. "Earth" – 13:16 – Joe Henderson
10. "Parallelograms" – 4:31 – Linda Perhacs
11. "Castles Made of Sand" – 3:35 – Four Tet
12. "Valiha Del" – 4:47 – Jef Gilson + Malagasy
13. "Strange Ways" (Koushik's Remix) – 2:13 – Madvillain
14. "Griffo" (Edit) – 0:49 – Smoke
15. "Tale in Hard Time" – 3:27 – Fairport Convention
16. "Tinkle" – 0:36 – J Saunders
17. "Benevolent Incubator" – 10:11 – Icarus
18. "218 Beverley" – 7:27 – Manitoba
19. "Don'ts" – 3:31 – David Shrigley
