= Sound Ancestors =

Studio album by Madlib
- Released: January 29, 2021
- Genres: Hip hop; Boom bap
- Length: 41:15
- Label: Madlib Invazion
- Producer: Madlib

Madlib chronology
Pardon My French (2020)	Sound Ancestors (2021)	In the Beginning, Vol. 1 (2021)

Singles from Sound Ancestors
- 1. "Road of the Lonely Ones" Released: December 14, 2020; 2. "Hopprock" Released: January 4, 2021; 3. "Dirtknock" Released: January 22, 2021

Sound Ancestors is a studio album by American musician Madlib. It was released on January 29, 2021, via Madlib Invazion. Produced by Madlib, it was arranged, edited and mastered by Four Tet. The album debuted at number 153 on the Billboard 200 in the United States.

== Release ==
On November 24, 2020, Four Tet announced that he was in the process of making a collaborative album with Madlib during a YouTube livestream.

Four Tet then announced on his Instagram account that he and Madlib were ready to release the studio album for January 2021.

The album's tracklist was revealed on January 11, 2021.

=== Singles ===
On December 14, 2020, the first single to be released was "Road of the Lonely Ones". The official music video was released on YouTube the same day. Rolling Stone described the single as a "simple but immersive track built around vocals that seem pulled from some forgotten soul 45 gathering dust in a crate."

The second single "Hopprock" was released on January 4, 2021. The music video was released on YouTube on January 9, 2021. Stereogum described the single as "a warm, hazy instrumental that Madlib and Four Tet wrote together. The track has a neck-cranking beat, a warm bassline, and a few samples chopped into the mix."

The third single "Dirtknock" was released on January 22, 2021.

== Critical reception ==
Professional ratings
Aggregate scores
Source	Rating
AnyDecentMusic?	7.6/10
Metacritic	87/100
Review scores
Source	Rating
Albumism	3.5/5 stars
AllMusic	3.5/5 stars
Beats Per Minute	80/100
Exclaim!	7/10
God Is in the TV	8/10
Pitchfork	7.9/10
Rolling Stone	4/5 stars
Spectrum Culture	3/5 stars
The Guardian	5/5 stars
The Line of Best Fit	8/10

Sound Ancestors was met with universal acclaim from music critics. At Metacritic, which assigns a normalized rating out of 100 to reviews from mainstream publications, the album received an average score of 87 based on ten reviews. The aggregator AnyDecentMusic? has the critical consensus of the album at a 7.6 out of 10, based on twelve reviews.

Tayyab Amin of The Guardian praised the album with perfect five-out-of-five stars rating, claiming that "Madlib channels a deep, intertwining lineage of Black music through Sound Ancestors like folklore oration, storytelling with the sorcery of a beatmaker who knows how to make an instrumental really sing". Seb Grech of Beats Per Minute described the album as "a realisation of what the Madlib and Hebden are capable of in tandem. It's bold, different, and takes the genre of instrumental hip hop to the next level". Richard Wiggins of God Is in the TV found "this record further cements his status as one of the most creative and inspirational producers of today". Jeff Ihaza of Rolling Stone wrote: "Like Akomfrah's Data Thief, Madlib sees the connections between the past and future. On Sound Ancestors, he manages to give us a sense of what those connections feel like". Leo Culp of The Line of Best Fit wrote that the album "isn't anything new from Madlib, but it only further cements his status as one of the great producers, artists, and minds in hip-hop". Andy Cush of Pitchfork wrote: "Hebden's arrangement of Sound Ancestors shows deep and intuitive engagement with Jackson's weed-scented sensibility, which has no use for presumptive distinctions between the beautiful and the funky, the silly and the profound". Jesse Ducker of Albumism stated that "Madlib has certainly started 2021 on the right foot musically". AllMusic's Paul Simpson wrote: "while Sound Ancestors as a whole seems as lifetime-encompassing as Donuts, it doesn't feel quite as focused. Still, it sounds recognizably like both Madlib and Four Tet while taking their music into directions where neither artist has ventured before, and its highlights are life-affirming". Daryl Keating of Exclaim! called the album "a mixed bag if ever there was one. It's funky, it's psychedelic, it's jazzy, dirty, clean, and mean. It's Madlib". Max Heilman of Spectrum Culture gave the album 3 out of 5 stars, resuming: "Sound Ancestors amounts to cool sonics that fail to leave a lasting impression".

=== Accolades ===
Sound Ancestors on year-end lists
Publication	List	Rank	Ref.
The Guardian	The 50 Best Albums of 2021	25	
Paste	The 50 Best Albums of 2021	19	

== Track listing ==
All tracks are written by Otis Jackson and Kieran Hebden.

No.	Title	Length
1.	"There Is No Time" (Prelude)	1:16
2.	"The Call"	2:05
3.	"Theme de Crabtree"	2:16
4.	"Road of the Lonely Ones"	3:38
5.	"Loose Goose"	2:21
6.	"Dirtknock"	2:14
7.	"Hopprock"	3:27
8.	"Riddim Chant"	1:58
9.	"Sound Ancestors"	2:50
10.	"One for Quartabê / Right Now"	2:42
11.	"Hang Out" (Phone Off)	2:15
12.	"Two for 2 – For Dilla"	2:51
13.	"Latino Negro"	3:36
14.	"The New Normal"	2:28
15.	"Chino"	1:57
16.	"Duumbiyay"	3:13
Total length:		41:15

== Personnel ==
- Otis "Madlib" Jackson Jr. – primary artist, production
- Kieran "Four Tet" Hebden – arrangement, editing, mastering
- Errol F. Richardson – art direction
- Richard Foster – photography
- Bernie Grundman – lacquer cut

== Charts ==
Chart performance for Sound Ancestors
Chart (2021)	Peak position
Belgian Albums (Ultratop Flanders)	116
Scottish Albums (Official Charts)	25
UK R&B Albums (Official Charts)	10
UK Independent Albums (Official Charts)	42
US Billboard 200	153
US Independent Albums (Billboard)	21
