= There Is Love in You =

Studio album by Four Tet
- Released: 25 January 2010
- Genre: House; folktronica; electronica; dance
- Length: 47:15
- Label: Domino
- Producer: Kieran Hebden

Four Tet chronology
Ringer (2008)	There Is Love in You (2010)	Pink (2012)

Singles from There Is Love in You
- 1. "Love Cry" Released: 2 November 2009; 2. "Sing" Released: 15 March 2010; 3. "Angel Echoes" Released: 19 July 2010

There Is Love in You is the fifth studio album by English electronic musician Four Tet, released on 25 January 2010 by Domino Recording Company. The lead single from the album, "Love Cry", was released as a limited edition 12" on 2 November 2009.

As of 2011, it has sold 22,228 copies in United States according to Nielsen SoundScan.

== Critical reception ==
Professional ratings
Aggregate scores
Source	Rating
AnyDecentMusic?	8.1/10
Metacritic	82/100
Review scores
Source	Rating
AllMusic	4.5/5 stars
The A.V. Club	A
The Irish Times	4/5 stars
Mojo	4/5 stars
NME	6/10
The Observer	4/5 stars
Pitchfork	8.6/10
Q	4/5 stars
Spin	7/10
The Times	5/5 stars

There Is Love in You received universal acclaim from music critics. At Metacritic, which assigns a normalized rating out of 100 to reviews from mainstream critics, the album received an average score of 82, based on 30 reviews. John Bush of AllMusic described There Is Love in You as "a reset album, one where Hebden pares his music down to the essentials" and "the most natural he's sounded on record in years", with "the spartan precision of Philip Glass but also, surprisingly, the warmth and vitality of classic Cluster as well." Chris Martins of The A.V. Club noted that the album continued in the "smoother" musical direction of Hebden's EP Ringer, "and to great effect—if this isn’t the best Four Tet record yet, it's certainly a fresh face for Hebden." Slant Magazine's Matthew Cole praised There Is Love in You as "his most inviting and accessible set of songs to date", while Q's Robin Turner wrote that the album "brims with a playful sense of wonder."

Mark Richardson of Pitchfork wrote that There Is Love in You "always has just enough going on to pull you back in any time you feel like relegating it to the background" and "works best taken whole, rather than broken into individual tracks". Ben Thompson of The Observer felt that the album "captures all that was special about dance music's mid-90s heyday". In a mixed review, NME's Louise Brailey felt that There Is Love in You peaks early with "Love Cry", and that Four Tet "fails to move forward on a nevertheless lovely seventh album". Robert Christgau, in his Consumer Guide column for MSN Music, gave the album a one-star honorable mention rating, indicating "a worthy effort consumers attuned to its overriding aesthetic or individual vision may well like".

== Accolades ==
Resident Advisor ranked There Is Love in You as the seventh best album of 2010. It also reached the top ten of year-end lists by musicOMH, who ranked it ninth, and The Seattle Times, whose critic Jonathan Zwickel ranked it tenth. There Is Love in You placed at number 35 on The Village Voice's year-end Pazz & Jop critics' poll, while also placing in the year-end lists of The A.V. Club at number 24, NME at number 45, and Pitchfork at number 27. Pitchfork later ranked it at number 63 on its list of the top 100 albums of 2010–2014, and at number 77 on its list of the top 200 best albums of the 2010s.

== Track listing ==
All tracks written and produced by Kieran Hebden.

No.	Title	Length
1.	"Angel Echoes"	4:00
2.	"Love Cry"	9:13
3.	"Circling"	5:18
4.	"Pablo's Heart"	0:12
5.	"Sing"	6:49
6.	"This Unfolds"	7:55
7.	"Reversing"	2:40
8.	"Plastic People"	6:34
9.	"She Just Likes to Fight"	4:34
Total length:		47:15

== Personnel ==
Credits adapted from the liner notes of There Is Love in You.

=== Technical personnel ===
- Kieran Hebden – production

=== Artwork ===
- Matthew Cooper – design
- Brian Dowling – photography
- Jason Evans – design, photography

== Charts ==
Chart (2010)	Peak position
Belgian Albums (Ultratop Flanders)	83
French Albums (SNEP)	189
Greek Albums (IFPI)	31
Irish Albums (IRMA)	56
UK Albums (OCC)	35
UK Dance Albums (OCC)	3
UK Independent Albums (OCC)	3
US Billboard 200	157
US Heatseekers Albums (Billboard)	1
US Independent Albums (Billboard)	39
US Top Dance Albums (Billboard)	17
