= The Dining Rooms =

- Origin: Milan, Italy
- Genres: Electronica, trip hop
- Years active: 1998–present
- Labels: Schema
- Members: Stefano Ghittoni; Cesare Malfatti

The Dining Rooms is a band based in Milan, Italy which combines ambient and electronic music, described as downbeat. The band consists of Stefano Ghittoni and Cesare Malfatti.

== Recent releases ==
In autumn 2008 "Other Ink" was released - which is the remix version of "Ink" - remixers involved are The Cinematic Orchestra, Populous, Christian Prommer and Skwerl, among others. The remixes are coupled by a new version of Ink, recorded live at Teatro I during Promise (musical esistenzialista), and by "Exit a New York", featuring CharlElie Couture and originally released only for the French market.

In the spring of 2009, to celebrate ten years of The Dining Rooms, Schema Records releases "Christian Prommer's Drumlesson plays The Dining Rooms: The Jazz Thing", containing songs such as Hear us Now, Dreamy Smiles, M. Dupont, Thin Ice, Prigionieri del Deserto, Thank You?, Destination Moon, No Problem, Tunnel, Milano Calibro 9, Afrolicious, Ink and Pure and Easy.

== Discography ==
- Subterranean Modern, Vol. 1 (1999)
- Remixes (2000)
- Numero Deux (2001)
- Tre (2003)
- Versioni Particolari (2004)
- Experiments in Ambient Soul (2005)
- Versioni Particolari 2 (2006)
- Ink (2007)
- If I Could EP (2007)
- Other Ink (2008)
- Christian Prommer's Drumlesson Plays the Dining Rooms (2009)
- Lonesome Traveller (2011)
- Do Hipsters Love Sun (Ra)? (2015)
- Art Is a Cat (2020)
- Songs to Make Love To (2024)
