= Thirtysixtwentyfive =

Single by Four Tet
- Released: 27 July 1998
- Genre: Nu-jazz, IDM
- Length: 36:25
- Label: Output Recordings (OPR014)
- Producer: Kieran Hebden

Four Tet singles chronology
| "Thirtysixtwentyfive" (1998) | "Misnomer" (1998) |

"Thirtysixtwentyfive" is the debut single from Kieran Hebden's solo project Four Tet. It was released on 7 July 1998 on Output Recordings. The song marked Hebden's first foray into independent music production, alongside his work with Fridge. The title of the single refers to its length of thirty-six minutes and twenty-five seconds.

The CD version of "Thirtysixtwentyfive" contains one continuous, unbroken track. The LP release, on the other hand, is split into two parts, "Eighteenfortythree" and "Seventeenfortytwo", each placed on one side of separate discs.

== Track listing ==
1. "Thirtysixtwentyfive" – 36:25
