= Pink (Four Tet album) =

Studio album by Four Tet
- Released: 20 August 2012
- Genres: Outsider house; future garage
- Length: 61:46
- Label: Text
- Producer: Kieran Hebden

Four Tet chronology
There Is Love in You (2010)	Pink (2012)	Beautiful Rewind (2013)

Singles from Pink
- 1. "Pinnacles" Released: 14 March 2011; 2. "Locked" / "Pyramid" Released: 12 September 2011; 3. "Jupiters" / "Ocoras" Released: 28 May 2012; 4. "128 Harps" Released: 2 July 2012; 5. "Lion" / "Peace for Earth" Released: 15 October 2012

Professional ratings
Aggregate scores
Source	Rating
AnyDecentMusic?	6.7/10
Metacritic	79/100
Review scores
Source	Rating
The Boston Phoenix	4/4 stars
The Irish Times	3/5 stars
Pitchfork	8.2/10
Q	4/5 stars
Resident Advisor	3.5/5
Spin	8/10
XLR8R	9.5/10

Pink is the sixth studio album by British electronic musician Kieran Hebden, released under his alias Four Tet on 20 August 2012 by Text Records. The album primarily comprises tracks that had already been issued as 12-inch singles; only "Lion" and "Peace for Earth" were previously unreleased.

Pink reached number 74 on the UK Albums Chart.

== Track listing ==
No.	Title	Length
1.	"Locked"	8:30
2.	"Lion"	9:01
3.	"Jupiters"	5:48
4.	"Ocoras"	5:24
5.	"128 Harps"	4:52
6.	"Pyramid"	8:27
7.	"Peace for Earth"	11:23
8.	"Pinnacles"	8:21
Total length:		61:46

== Charts ==
Chart (2012)	Peak position
UK Albums (Official Charts)	74
UK Dance Albums (Official Charts)	3
UK Independent Albums (Official Charts)	8
US Heatseekers Albums (Billboard)	38
US Top Dance Albums (Billboard)	23
