= My Angel Rocks Back and Forth =

Single by Four Tet
- Released: 3 May 2004
- Genre: Outsider house
- Length: CD: 23:23; DVD: 18:14
- Label: Domino
- Songwriter(s): Kieran Hebden
- Producer(s): Four Tet

Four Tet singles chronology
"As Serious as Your Life" (2003)	"My Angel Rocks Back and Forth" (2004)	"Castles Made of Sand" (2004)

"My Angel Rocks Back and Forth" is a song by Four Tet, released on 3 May 2004 as a 12-inch single and CD single. The title track was originally part of Four Tet's previous album, Rounds. The CD edition comes with a bonus DVD of all of Four Tet's promotional videos to date.

The track was used as part of the soundtrack for Britney Spears's 2008 documentary, Britney: For the Record.

== Track listing ==
12" / CD
No.	Title	Length
1.	"My Angel Rocks Back and Forth" (album version)	5:11
2.	"My Angel Rocks Back and Forth" (Four Teas on English Time — Icarus remix)	7:20
3.	"First Thing/Chia" (The Space Between 3 and 7 — Isambard Khroustaliov remix)	5:21
4.	"I've Got Viking in Me"	2:16
5.	"All the Chimers"	3:16

DVD
No.	Title	Length
1.	"My Angel Rocks Back and Forth" (directed by Woof Wan-Bau)	5:07
2.	"She Moves She" (directed by Dougal Wilson)	4:41
3.	"As Serious as Your Life" (directed by Ed Holdsworth)	4:48
4.	"No More Mosquitoes" (directed by Gordon Sharples)	3:38

== Charts ==
Chart performance for "My Angel Rocks Back and Forth"
Chart (2004)	Peak position
UK Singles (OCC)	156
