= Four Tet =

British electronic musician and DJ (born 1977)

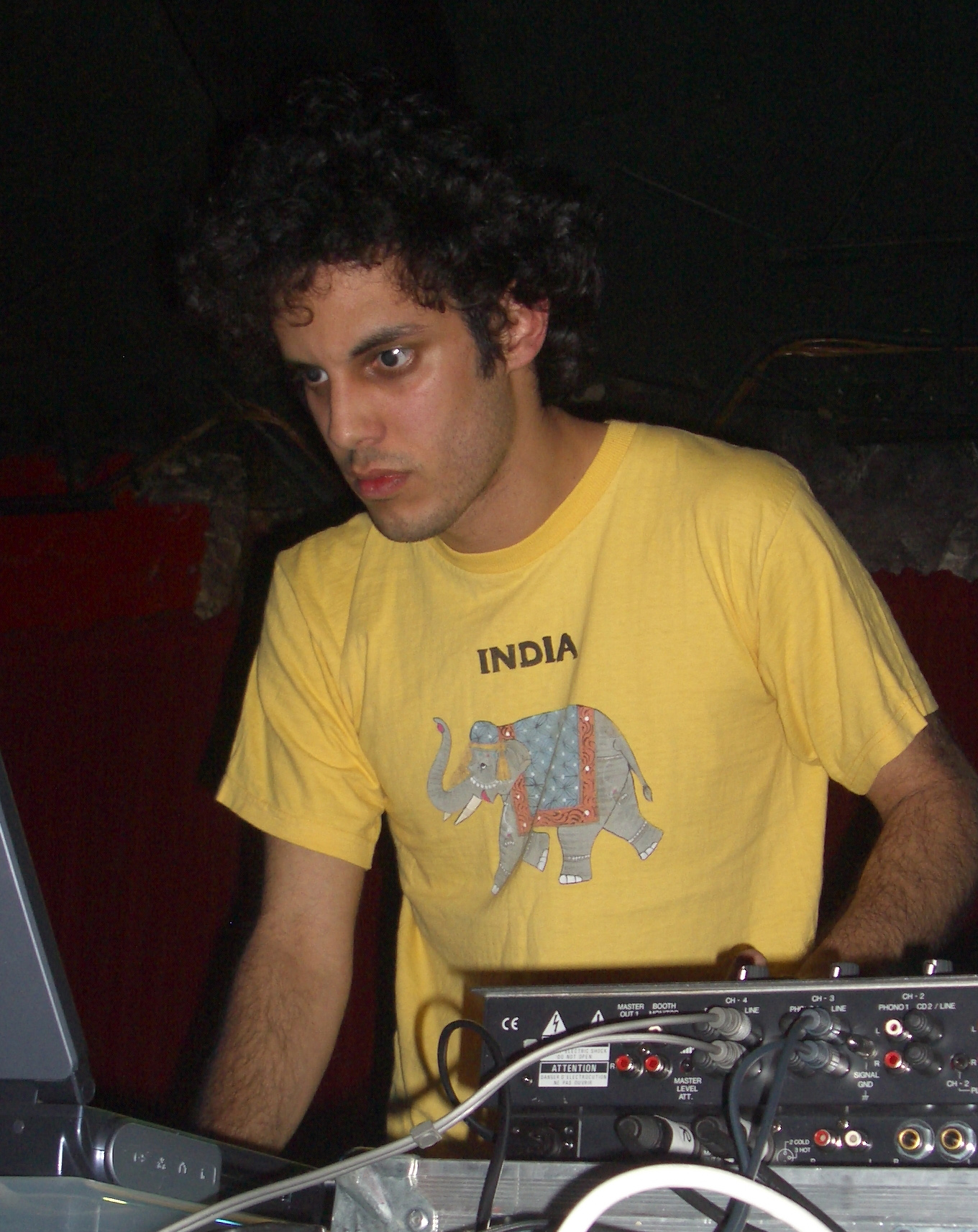
- Hebden performing in 2004 at the Grog Shop in Cleveland, Ohio

Background information
- Also known as: KH; △▃△▓; ⣎⡇ꉺლ༽இ•̛)ྀ◞ ༎ຶ ༽ৣৢ؞ৢ؞ؖ ꉺლ (Note: Commonly referred to as "Wingdings".); 00110100 01010100; 4T Recordings; 4TLR; Percussions; 00000ooooo; Joshua Falken
- Born: September 1977 (age 49); Putney, London, England
- Genres: Indie electronic; dance; house; folktronica; IDM
- Instruments: Keyboards; sampler
- Works: Four Tet discography
- Years active: 1995–present
- Labels: Output; Domino; Text
- Formerly of: Fridge
- Website: fourtet.net

Kieran Miles David Hebden (born September 1977), known as Four Tet, is an English electronic musician. He came to prominence as a member of the post-rock band Fridge before establishing himself as a solo artist with charting and critically acclaimed albums such as Rounds (2003), Everything Ecstatic (2005) and There Is Love in You (2010). In addition to his twelve studio albums as Four Tet, Hebden's work includes a number of improvisational works with jazz drummer Steve Reid and collaborations with Burial and Thom Yorke.

Alongside his own recordings, Hebden arranged the 2021 Madlib album Sound Ancestors. He has also remixed tracks by artists including Aphex Twin, Bloc Party, Super Furry Animals, Radiohead, Ellie Goulding and Madvillain; several of these were collected on the compilation Remixes (2006). He has additionally performed DJ mixes, including sets with American producer Skrillex and British producer Fred Again.

== Early life ==
Kieran Hebden was born in Putney, London, England, to a South African-born Indian mother and a British sociology lecturer father. He attended Elliott School in Putney, where he formed the band Fridge with classmates Adem Ilhan and Sam Jeffers. The band signed a recording contract when Hebden was 15, and released their first album, Ceefax, on Trevor Jackson's Output Recordings label in March 1997. While working with Fridge, Hebden began a degree in maths and computer sciences at the University of Manchester alongside the members of Simian Mobile Disco.

His stage name Four Tet is derived from the 1971 album 4 Tet by Dutch jazz-saxophonist Harry Verbeke.

== Career ==
Hebden's first solo release was the 1997 single "Double Density", released on the Output label under the artist name 4T Recordings. He began releasing material as Four Tet in 1998 with the 36 minute, 25 second single "Thirtysixtwentyfive". Later that year, he released another single, the jazz-influenced "Misnomer". 1999's Dialogue, again on Output, was Four Tet's first full-length album release and fused hip-hop drum lines with dissonant jazz samples. This was followed by the double A-side single "Glasshead"/"Calamine", which was to be Four Tet's last release on Output. In late 1999, Warp Records released Warp 10 + 3: Remixes, a tenth-anniversary compilation of remixes of Warp tracks. Hebden contributed a remix of the opening track of Aphex Twin's Selected Ambient Works Volume II, which was considered to be his break-out release.

In 2001, Four Tet's second album Pause was released on Domino Recording Company and found Hebden using more folk and electronic samples, which was quickly dubbed "folktronica" by the media and press in an attempt to label the style (often also applied to artists such as Isan and Gravenhurst). Rounds was released in May 2003. Three singles were released from the album: "She Moves She", "As Serious as Your Life" and "My Angel Rocks Back and Forth". This last single was released as an EP featuring remixes by electronica duo Icarus and Isambard Khroustaliov along with additional Four Tet tracks "I've Got Viking in Me" and "All the Chimers". An accompanying DVD featured all of Four Tet's videos to date. In addition, the closing track "Everything is Alright" was featured in a U.S. Nike commercial in 2001 and 2002.

At the beginning of 2003, Four Tet opened for Radiohead on their European tour. A remix of the song "Scatterbrain" from Radiohead's sixth studio album Hail to the Thief was released in November 2003 as a B-side to the single "2 + 2 = 5" and later included on their 2004 EP COM LAG (2plus2isfive). Furthermore, Hebden was among the people thanked by Radiohead in the booklet accompanying their 2007 In Rainbows "discbox" release.

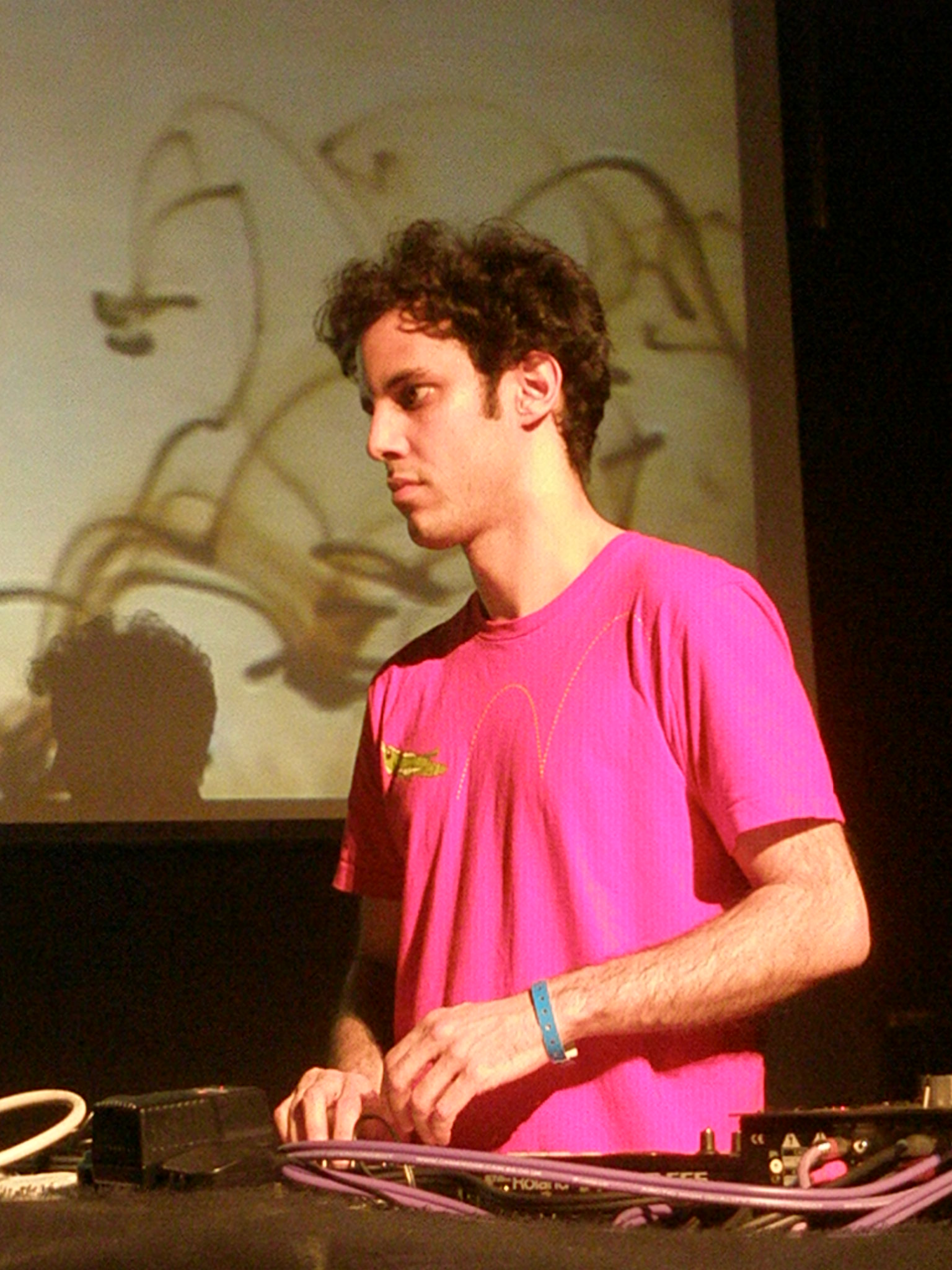
Hebden performing at Circulo de Bellas Artes in Madrid, Spain, in 2008

A live album named Live in Copenhagen 30th March 2004 was released in April 2004 as a limited edition, available exclusively from the Domino Records website.

In March and April 2005, Four Tet performed two shows of improvisational music, in collaboration with jazz drummer Steve Reid, in Paris and London. He also appears on Steve Reid Ensemble 2005 album Spirit Walk. This collaboration was extended into a series of international tours, and the release of two albums, The Exchange Session Vol. 1 and The Exchange Session Vol. 2 over the course of 2005 and 2006.

His fourth studio album Everything Ecstatic was released on Domino on 23 May 2005. The video for the lead single, "Smile Around the Face", features actor Mark Heap. On 7 November 2005, Domino released a DVD version of Everything Ecstatic featuring video clips for each track of the album plus a CD with new material, titled Everything Ecstatic Part 2, which was later made available as an individual EP.

Hebden has also remixed, under the Four Tet name, tracks by a wide range of artists including Tegan And Sara, Madvillain, Andrew Bird, Bloc Party, Super Furry Animals, Beth Orton, Badly Drawn Boy, CYNE, the Notwist, Boom Bip, Battles, Kings of Convenience, Lars Horntveth, Bonobo, Rothko, the xx, Thom Yorke and Radiohead. On 25 September 2006, Domino Records released Remixes, a two-disc compilation of Four Tet remixes. The first disc contains twelve Four Tet remixes selected by Hebden, with the second disc comprising every official remix to date (both by Hebden himself and by other artists) of Four Tet tracks, many of which had previously been available on vinyl only. A new EP, Ringer, was released on 21 April 2008.

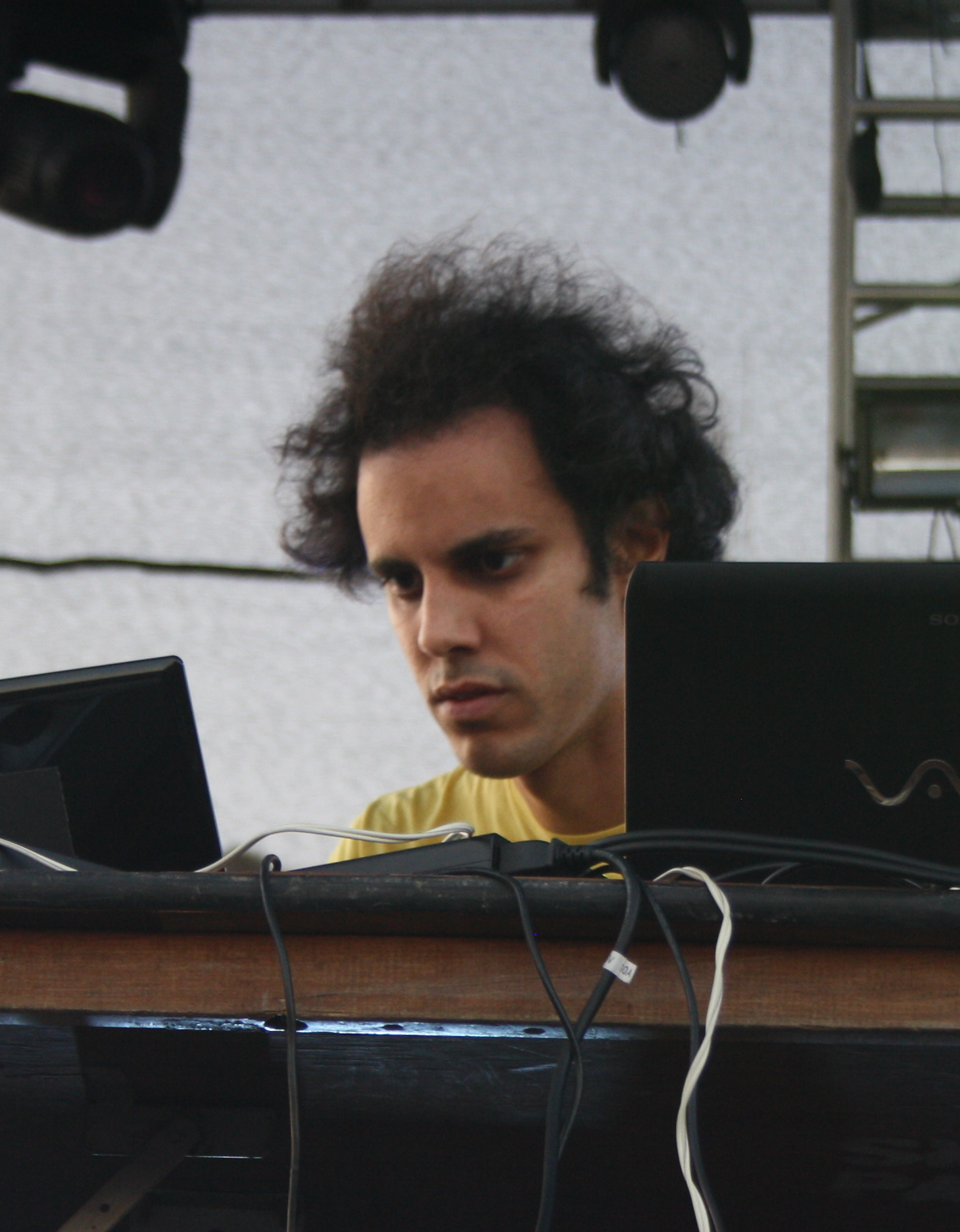
Four Tet performing in 2011 in Los Angeles, California

In 2008, he collaborated with composer David Arnold to write "Crawl, End Crawl", the song used for the end credits of the film Quantum of Solace. He worked on a secret collaboration with former schoolmate Burial the following year.

In November 2009, he released the fifth full-length Four Tet album. Heavily influenced by a period DJing at the Plastic People club in Shoreditch and entitled There Is Love in You, it was released on 25 January 2010. The album was preceded by a limited edition release of the 12" single "Love Cry".

In 2010, Hebden collaborated with Laurie Anderson playing keyboards on the song "Only an Expert" from her Homeland album. In 2011, he released a split 12-inch with Burial and Thom Yorke, titled "Ego"/"Mirror". He began to release music under the alias Percussions, following a track he produced on his Fabriclive mix CD. He was chosen by Caribou to perform at the ATP Nightmare Before Christmas festival that they co-curated in December 2011 in Minehead, England.

In 2012, Hebden collaborated again with Burial on the track "Nova".

The sixth full-length Four Tet album, Pink, consisting of eight tracks, six of them already released as singles, was released on 20 August 2012 through Hebden's own record label, Text Records. Hebden followed up Pink with 0181 on 15 January 2013. 0181 is a collection of unreleased material from 1997 to 2001, collected as one track and released online. A vinyl version was also released on the Text Records label.

Hebden released the seventh Four Tet album, Beautiful Rewind, in October 2013, and his eighth album, Morning/Evening in July 2015.

Hebden undertook a month-long residency as Four Tet for online radio station NTS Radio in May 2014. He has been an occasional DJ for NTS, playing in February, June and November 2015, and again alongside fellow DJ and producer Floating Points in June and October 2016, and March 2017. In September 2017, Hebden released the ninth Four Tet album New Energy. That November he was nominated for a Grammy Award for Best Remixed Recording, Production, Non-Classical, for his remix of The xx's "Violent Noise".

On 1 March 2019, Hebden released Only Human, his first new track since his last album, New Energy, the track was named 'Best New Music' by Pitchfork, shortly after release. A month after, on 17 April 2019, Hebden released another new single, "Teenage Birdsong".

In May 2019, Hebden played two shows at London's Alexandra Palace, his largest shows to date. The performance was filmed as part of the music video for Teenage Birdsong. A live recording of the two shows was released on 29 July 2019 under his "4TLR" moniker.

On 29 August 2019, Hebden had released a collection of three brand new songs as part of an EP called Anna Painting. The project was made in collaboration with painter Anna Liber Lewis, and features artwork by Liber Lewis in the release.

On 21 January 2020, Hebden announced his tenth album Sixteen Oceans for release in March.

Starting in September 2020, Hebden began a string of concurrent live streams. The livestreams included songs from other artists as well as his own remixes. The music was accompanied by various animations from artists, including Anna Liber Lewis. Some of the material was released on Christmas Day of 2020 across two albums, Parallel and 871, under the Four Tet and 00110100 01010100 monikers respectively. Over a year later, on 28 October 2021, the live stream concluded.

Information about a second collaboration with Burial and Thom Yorke, entitled Her Revolution / His Rope, surfaced around 2 December 2020, and a very limited 12" was released in three known record stores. Hebden collaborated with Madlib for the album Sound Ancestors, which was released on 29 January 2021.

In August 2021, Hebden filed a legal suit against Domino Records for "damages of up to £70,000" in an ongoing dispute regarding streaming royalties. The case pertained to Hebden's recording contract with Domino, which he signed in February 2001. Hebden argued that the contract entitled him to 50% of all of his royalties from streaming services based outside of the United Kingdom. Domino argued that contractual clause cited by Hebden does not apply to streaming royalties. The label, citing a separate clause, argued that Hebden "was only entitled to 75% of 18% of the dealer price (i.e. a 13.5% royalty rate)." A settlement out of court was not reached, and the case would be decided upon by a judge of the Business and Property Courts of the High Court of Justice. In November 2021, three albums by Four Tet were removed from streaming services. Hebden claims he was informed by Domino's legal team that the label would remove his music from all digital platforms "in order to stop the case progressing", which he disagreed to. In June 2022, Hebden announced that he won the suit in the Intellectual Property Enterprise Court, receiving £56,921.08, plus his legal costs, after Domino agreed to backpay the 50 percent rate.

In February 2023, Hebden, along with Skrillex and Fred Again, played a 5-hour set in a sold-out show at Madison Square Garden.

In a series of tweets on 12 April 2023, Hebden announced that he was working on a new album with music planned to be released "before the shows start", in reference to his May 2023 tour with Squidsoup. He also announced that he was working on music with William Tyler. On 25 April, Four Tet's single Three Drums was played on BBC Radio 6 Music before being released. Although it appeared that his new album was completed and pressed on vinyl due to Instagram stories and a tweet, "TEXT055" was instead a collaboration between Fred Again and Brian Eno.

Hebden released Three on 15 March 2024. He first previewed the album with its opening track "Loved" on 10 January 2024. On 14 February 2024, to coincide with Valentine's Day, Hebden released the track "Daydream Repeat." On 9 September 2024, Hebden released the single "In My Dreams", in collaboration with singer Ellie Goulding.

In November 2024, Hebden received two Grammy nominations for his album "Three", for "Best Dance/Electronic Recording" with "Loved," and for "Best Dance/Electronic Album." He also received a nomination for "Best Dance/Electronic Recording" for his production on "leavemealone", a collaboration between Fred Again and Baby Keem.

== Musical style ==
AllMusic's Paul Simpson called Hebden "perhaps the definitive indie electronic artist", noting that his "experimental yet highly accessible recordings, which blend organic and electronic sounds, have earned widespread acclaim from critics and fans of electronic music as well as indie rock." His work has drawn influence from styles such as spiritual jazz, krautrock, folk music, and hip-hop. According to Piotr Orlov of Pitchfork, Hebden's music has touched on genres such as folktronica, electronic jazz and global trance, with his 2003 album Rounds specifically drawing from hip-hop's collage approach and "pushing IDM into a whole new space." Hebden rejected critics' early labeling of him as a "folktronica" artist as misleading, calling attention to the influence of hip-hop producers such as Rodney Jerkins and Timbaland on his work instead.

== Discography ==
=== Albums (as Four Tet) ===
List of studio albums, with selected details, chart positions and certifications
Title	Details	Peak chart positions						
Title	Details	UK	BEL (FL)	IRE	SCO	UK Dance	US	US Dance
Dialogue	Released: 1 February 1999; Label: Output Recordings	—	—	—	—	—	—	—
Pause	Released: 28 May 2001; Label: Domino Records	—	—	—	—	—	—	—
Rounds	Released: 5 May 2003; Label: Domino Records	60	—	57	48	—	—	25
Everything Ecstatic	Released: 23 May 2005; Label: Domino Records	59	—	67	—	—	—	—
There Is Love in You	Released: 25 January 2010; Label: Domino Records	35	83	56	—	3	157	17
Pink	Released: 20 August 2012; Label: Text Records	74	—	—	—	3	—	23
Beautiful Rewind	Released: 14 October 2013; Label: Text Records	108	152	—	—	19	—	15
Morning/Evening	Released: 21 June 2015; Label: Text Records	48	94	—	57	—	—	23
New Energy	Released: 29 September 2017; Label: Text Records	48	—	—	70	1	—	—
Sixteen Oceans	Released: 13 March 2020; Label: Text Records	34	143	—	26	—	—	22
Parallel	Released: 25 December 2020; Label: Text Records	—	—	—	—	—	—	—
Three	Released: 15 March 2024; Label: Text Records	66	177	—	14	1	—	—

=== Mix albums ===
- Late Night Tales: Four Tet (Azuli Records, 4 October 2004) (DJ mix album compiled by Hebden)
- DJ-Kicks: Four Tet (Studio !K7, 26 June 2006) (mix album in the DJ-Kicks series)
- FabricLive.59 (Fabric Records, September 2011) (mix album in the Fabric discography series)

=== Albums (as Kieran Hebden) ===
- The Exchange Session Vol. 1 (with Steve Reid; Domino Records, 27 February 2006)
- The Exchange Session Vol. 2 (with Steve Reid; Domino Records, 22 May 2006)
- Tongues (with Steve Reid; Domino Records, 19 March 2007)
- NYC (with Steve Reid; Domino Records, 4 November 2008)
- 41 Longfield Street Late '80s (with William Tyler; 19 September 2025)

=== Albums (as 00110100 01010100) ===
- 0181 (Text Records, 15 January 2013)
- 871 (Text Records, December 2020)

=== Albums (as ⣎⡇ꉺლ༽இ•̛)ྀ◞ ༎ຶ ༽ৣৢ؞ৢ؞ؖ ꉺლ) ===
- ʅ͡͡͡͡͡͡͡͡͡͡͡(̸̢̛̼̞̭͋ͅ)̸͚̰͛̔̾̀̿͒͂:̴͓̞̑̌̂̆̊͋̀:̸͎̟̯̂̓̌ ҉ ͡ ͞ ͞ ͞ ҉● ࿀ ● ࿀ ● ҉⃝ ⃝͢ ͞ ͘ ͞⃝̕ ͢ ̛ ⃝ ̸ ̡ ͢⃝̧ ͡ ͡ ̀ ̧ ̢⃝͜ ҉ ͞ ͞ ⃝͞ ͞ ͡⃝ ⃝҉҈҉҈҉҈҉҈҉҈҉ :̶̢͙͙͕̠̩͆(̷̮͍͚̫͚͂̍)̵̳̗̊ (̟̞̝̜̙̘̗̖҉̵̴̨̧̢̡̼̻̺̹̳̲̱̰̯̮̭̬̫̪̩̦̥) (Note: The album title is officially unpronounceable, and in certain contexts unrenderable; it, too, is to be referred to as "Wingdings".) (Text Records; 3 July 2026)

== Awards and nominations ==
Award	Year	Category	Nominated work	Result	Ref.
Grammy Awards	2018	Best Remixed Recording, Non-Classical	"A Violent Noise (Four Tet Remix)"	Nominated	
Grammy Awards	2023	Best Remixed Recording, Non-Classical	"Easy Lover (Four Tet Remix)"	Nominated	
Grammy Awards	2025	Grammy Award for Best Dance/Electronic Recording	"Loved"	Nominated	
Grammy Awards	2025	Grammy Award for Best Dance/Electronic Recording	"leavemealone" (as producer)	Nominated	
Grammy Awards	2025	Grammy Award for Best Dance/Electronic Album	Three	Nominated	
