= Sixteen Oceans =

Studio album by Four Tet
- Released: 13 March 2020
- Length: 54:37
- Label: Text
- Producer: Kieran Hebden

Four Tet chronology
New Energy (2017)	Sixteen Oceans (2020)	Parallel (2020)

Singles from Sixteen Oceans
- 1. "Teenage Birdsong" Released: 17 April 2019; 2. "Baby" Released: 23 January 2020; 3. "4T Recordings" Released: 3 March 2020

Professional ratings
Aggregate scores
Source	Rating
Metacritic	74/100
Review scores
Source	Rating
AllMusic	3.5/5 stars
Exclaim!	7/10
MusicOMH	3/5 stars
Paste	7.3/10
Pitchfork	6.9/10

Sixteen Oceans is the tenth studio album by British electronic musician Kieran Hebden, released under his alias Four Tet on 13 March 2020. The album contains the previously released single "Teenage Birdsong". To support the album, another single named "Baby", featuring vocals by British singer Ellie Goulding, was released on 23 January 2020. A third single titled "4T Recordings" was released on 3 March 2020.

== Announcement ==
On 21 January 2020, Four Tet posted an image on his Instagram account of a Post-it note with the title and the track listing of the album, and the message "new album released March 2020".

== Track listing ==
Sixteen Oceans track listing
No.	Title	Length
1.	"School"	4:02
2.	"Baby"	4:24
3.	"Harpsichord"	2:53
4.	"Teenage Birdsong"	3:25
5.	"Romantics"	4:57
6.	"Love Salad"	7:20
7.	"Insect Near Piha Beach"	5:15
8.	"Hi Hello"	0:48
9.	"ISTM"	0:40
10.	"Something in the Sadness"	5:11
11.	"1993 Band Practice"	1:05
12.	"Green"	3:48
13.	"Bubbles at Overlook 25th March 2019"	1:03
14.	"4T Recordings"	3:17
15.	"This Is for You"	2:05
16.	"Mama Teaches Sanskrit"	4:24
Total length:		54:37

Notes

- "Baby" features vocals by Ellie Goulding.

== Charts ==
Chart performance for Sixteen Oceans
Chart (2020)	Peak position
Belgian Albums (Ultratop Flanders)	143
Scottish Albums (Official Charts)	26
UK Albums (Official Charts)	34
US Top Dance Albums (Billboard)	22
