= 871 (album) =

Studio album by 00110100 01010100
- Released: 25 December 2020
- Length: 68:07
- Label: Text
- Producer: Kieran Hebden

00110100 01010100 chronology
0181 (2013)	871 (2020)

Professional ratings
Review scores
Source	Rating
The Observer	4/5 stars
Pitchfork	(7.1/10.0)

871 is an album by British electronic musician Four Tet, under his alias 00110100 01010100, released on 25 December 2020 on his own label Text Records.

== Description ==
The album's material was produced between August 1995 and January 1997, before the release of the first Four Tet EP in 1998.

Damien Morris wrote in The Observer that "Its music mostly dates back to 1996, and you can hear the teenaged Hebden essaying plangent shoegaze, ambient techno and trip-hop..."

Philip Sherburne wrote for Pitchfork that "There are blasts of overdriven electric guitar, effects-pedal experiments steeped in line noise, and even a folk song played on hard-panned acoustic guitars. [. . .] There are glimmers of the palette that would come to define Four Tet's work, but mostly these pieces show the influence of the decade's mischievously experimental spirit."

== Tracklisting ==
All tracks are written by Kieran Hebden.

No.	Title	Length
1.	"0000 871 0001"	1:00
2.	"0000 871 0002"	1:29
3.	"0000 871 0003"	1:15
4.	"0000 871 0004"	1:35
5.	"0000 871 0005"	3:30
6.	"0000 871 0006"	3:29
7.	"0000 871 0007"	6:03
8.	"0000 871 0008"	4:03
9.	"0000 871 0009"	0:32
10.	"0000 871 0010"	9:14
11.	"0000 871 0011"	0:18
12.	"0000 871 0012"	4:12
13.	"0000 871 0013"	2:55
14.	"0000 871 0014"	2:38
15.	"0000 871 0015"	4:51
16.	"0000 871 0016"	4:19
17.	"0000 871 0017"	4:36
18.	"0000 871 0018"	5:02
19.	"0000 871 0019"	1:24
20.	"0000 871 0020"	5:24

== See also ==
- 0181 (album)
