= Everything Ecstatic =

Studio album by Four Tet
- Released: 23 May 2005
- Genres: Electronic; folktronica; krautrock
- Length: 45:22
- Labels: Domino, WIG154 (UK) / DNO061 (US)
- Producer: Kieran Hebden

Four Tet chronology
Late Night Tales: Four Tet (2004)	Everything Ecstatic (2005)	Remixes (2006)

Singles from Everything Ecstatic
- 1. "Smile Around the Face" Released: 11 April 2005; 2. "Sun Drums and Soil" Released: 11 July 2005; 3. "A Joy" Released: 24 October 2005

Professional ratings
Aggregate scores
Source	Rating
Metacritic	77/100
Review scores
Source	Rating
AllMusic	3.5/5 stars
Blender	3/5 stars
The Guardian	4/5 stars
Mojo	4/5 stars
NME	8/10
Pitchfork	7.4/10
Q	3/5 stars
Rolling Stone	3/5 stars
Spin	B
The Village Voice	A−

Everything Ecstatic is the fourth album by Four Tet, released on 23 May 2005.

The video for lead single "Smile Around the Face" features actor Mark Heap.

== Track listing ==
1. "A Joy" – 3:07
2. "Smile Around the Face" – 4:30
3. "Fuji Check" – 0:23
4. "Sun Drums and Soil" – 6:14
5. "Clouding" – 1:43
6. "And Then Patterns" – 4:42
7. "High Fives" – 5:06
8. "Turtle Turtle Up" – 2:09
9. "Sleep, Eat Food, Have Visions" – 7:43
10. "You Were There with Me" – 5:52

== DVD edition ==
A DVD edition of the album, featuring a video for each of the tracks, was released on 7 November 2005 and comes with a bonus CD of previously unreleased material, Everything Ecstatic Part 2, the track listing of which is as follows:

1. "Turtle Turtle Up (extended version)" – 16:16
2. "Sun Drums and Soil (Part 2)" – 5:31
3. "Watching Wavelength" – 4:31
4. "This Is Six Minutes" – 6:03
5. "Ending" – 0:50

Everything Ecstatic Part 2 was later released separately on vinyl through Domino Records.

== Charts ==
Chart (2005)	Peak position
Irish Albums (IRMA)	67
UK Albums (Official Charts)	59
