= Text Records =

British independent record label

Text Records is a British independent record label founded by Kieran Hebden in 1999. Hebden has released much of his own music through the label: several albums and singles as Four Tet (including collaborations with Burial and Thom Yorke) and two albums with the band Fridge. Other artists to have released recordings on the label include Daphni, Koushik and One Little Plane.

== Catalogue ==
| Catalogue identifier | Artist | Name | Year released |
|---|---|---|---|
| TEXT001 | Koushik | Battle Times EP | 2001 |
| TEXT002CD | Fridge | Happiness | 2001 |
| TEXT002 LP | Fridge | Happiness | 2001 |
| TEXT003 | Fridge | The Sun | 2007 |
| TEXT004 | One Little Plane | Sunshine Kid | 2008 |
| TEXT005 | One Little Plane | Until | 2008 |
| None | One Little Plane | "Sunshine Kid" (single) | 2008 |
| TEXT006 | Burial + Four Tet | Moth/Wolf Cub | 2009 |
| TEXT007 | One Little Plane | Lotus Flower | 2009 |
| TEXT008 | Rocketnumbernine | Matthew and Toby | 2010 |
| TEXT009 | Four Tet / Daphni | Pinnacles / Ye Ye | 2011 |
| TEXT010 | Burial + Four Tet + Thom Yorke | Ego / Mirror | 2011 |
| TEXT011 | Four Tet | Locked / Pyramid | 2011 |
| TEXT012 | Juk Juk | Winter Turns Spring / Frozen | 2011 |
| TEXT013 | Burial + Four Tet | Nova | 2012 |
| TEXT014 | One Little Plane | Into The Trees | 2012 |
| TEXT015 | Four Tet | Jupiters / Ocoras | 2012 |
| TEXT016 | Four Tet | 128 Harps | 2012 |
| TEXT017 | Percussions | Bird Songs / Rabbit Songs | 2012 |
| TEXT018 | Four Tet | Pink | 2012 |
| TEXT019 | Four Tet | Lion / Peace For Earth | 2012 |
| TEXT020 | Four Tet | Jupiters / Lion (Remixes) | 2012 |
| TEXT021 | 00110100 01010100 (Kieren Hebden) | 0181 | 2013 |
| TEXT022 | KH | TTIBPTPKAAATJUIHRAMADPOBR | 2013 |
| TEXT023 | Four Tet & Rocketnumbernine | Roseland / Metropolis | 2013 |
| TEXT024 | Four Tet | Kool FM | 2013 |
| TEXT025 | Four Tet | Beautiful Rewind | 2013 |
| TEXT026 | Four Tet | Kool FM (Champion & Container Remixes) | 2013 |
| TEXT027 | Crazy Bald Heads | First Born | 2014 |
| TEXT028 | Four Tet & Terror Danjah | Killer / Nasty | 2014 |
| TEXT029 | Percussions | KHLHI / Sext | 2014 |
| TEXT030 | Percussions | Ascii Bot / Blatant Water Cannon | 2014 |
| TEXT031 | Taraval | Streetways EP | 2014 |
| TEXT032 | Four Tet | Beautiful Rewind (Remixes) | 2014 |
| TEXT033 | John Beltran | Faux | 2014 |
| TEXT034 | Anthony Naples | Body Pill | 2015 |
| TEXT035 | Kieran Hebden & Steve Reid | Strings Of Life / Tongues | 2015 |
| TEXT036 | Four Tet | Morning / Evening | 2015 |
| TEXT037 | Joe | Thinkin About | 2015 |
| TEXTDDD01 | Percussions | "Digital Arpeggios" (Single) | 2015 |
| TEXT038 | Four Tet & Designer | Mothers / Dark | 2016 |
| TEXT039 | Four Tet & Champion | Flip Side / Disparate | 2016 |
| TEXTDDD02 | Four Tet | Pink Remixes | 2016 |
| TEXTDDD03 | Four Tet | "Evening Side (Oneohtrix Point Never Edit)" | 2016 |
| TEXT040 | Taraval | II (EP) | 2016 |
| none | Four Tet | Randoms | 2016 |
| TEXTDDD04 | Four Tet | Beautiful Rewind Remixes | 2016 |
| TEXT041 | Four Tet | Ringer | 2017 |
| TEXT042 | Four Tet | There Is Love In You | 2017 |
| TEXT042X | Four Tet | There Is Love In You Expanded Edition | 2017 |
| TEXT043 | Four Tet | There Is Love In You (Remixes) | 2017 |
| TEXT044 | KH | Question | 2017 |
| TEXT045 | Four Tet | SW9 9SL / Planet | 2017 |
| TEXT046 | Four Tet | New Energy | 2017 |
| TEXTDDD05 | Four Tet | "Two Thousand And Seventeen" (Single) | 2017 |
| TEXTDDD06 | Four Tet | Planet | 2017 |
| TEXTDDD07 | Four Tet | SW9 9SL | 2017 |
| TEXTDDD08 | Four Tet | Scientists | 2017 |
| TEXTLR001 | 4TLR | Live at Funkhaus Berlin 10 May 2018 | 2018 |
| TEXTLR002 | 4TLR | Live in Tokyo 1 December 2013 | 2018 |
| TEXTLR003 | 4TLR | Live at Hultsfred Festival, 18 June 2004 | 2018 |
| TEXT047 | Taraval | Aardvark | 2018 |
| TEXT048 | KH | Only Human | 2019 |
| TEXT049 | Four Tet | Anna Painting | 2019 |
| TEXT050 | Four Tet | Teenage Birdsong | 2019 |
| TEXT051 | Four Tet | Sixteen Oceans | 2020 |
| TEXTDDD16 | Four Tet | Parallel | 2020 |
| TEXT053 | Four Tet (Wingdings alias) | Untitled | 2021 |
| TEXTDDD15 | 00110100 01010100 | 871 | 2020 |
| TEXTDDD18 | Burial + Four Tet | Nova / Moth | 2022 |
| TEXTDDD19 | Hagop Tchaparian | GL / Raining | 2022 |
| TEXTDDD20 | Hagop Tchaparian | Round | 2022 |
| TEXTDDD21 | Hagop Tchaparian | Right To Riot | 2022 |
| TEXTDDD22 | Four Tet | Mango Feedback | 2022 |
| TEXTDDD23 | Hagop Tchaparian | "Round (Four Tet Remix)" | 2022 |
| TEXT054 | Hagop Tchaparian | Bolts | 2022 |
| TEXT055 | Fred again.. & Brian Eno | Secret Life | 2023 |
| TEXT056 | Four Tet | Three | 2024 |
