= Big Blood =

American psychedelic folk band

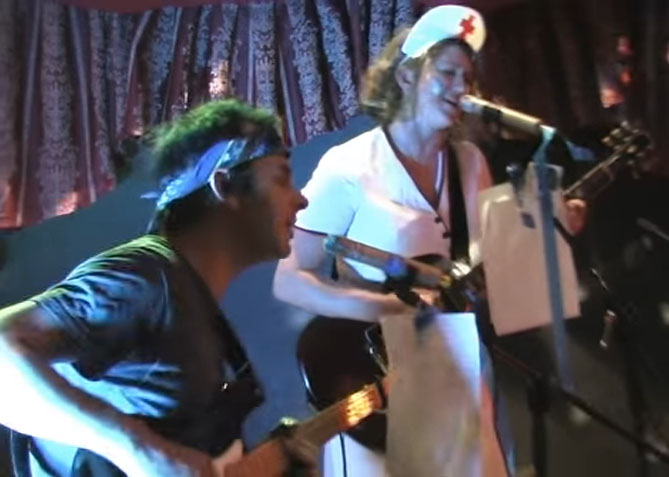
- Big Blood in 2011; L to R: Caleb Mulkerin and Colleen Kinsella

Background information
- Origin: South Portland, Maine, United States
- Genres: Psychedelic folk; New Weird America; experimental rock; alternative country
- Years active: 2006–present
- Members: Colleen Kinsella (aka "Asian Mae"); Caleb Mulkerin (aka "Rose Philistine"); Quinnisa Rose Kinsella Mulkerin
- Past members: Shon Mahoney

Big Blood is an American band formed in South Portland, Maine, in 2006. The band's music fuses psychedelic folk, experimental rock, and an eclectic array of other styles and influences. Big Blood originated as a husband-and-wife duo of Colleen Kinsella and Caleb Mulkerin, who had previously been bandmates together in Cerberus Shoal. They formed Big Blood shortly after the birth of their daughter, Quinnisa Rose Kinsella Mulkerin, who began featuring in the band's recordings in 2010 and later became a full-fledged member.

Big Blood has self-released most of their recordings with unique handmade packaging, although starting with their 2010 album Dead Songs they have also distributed some albums through independent record labels. The band has also made most of their discography available to freely stream or download via the Free Music Archive. Big Blood is regarded as a mainstay of the 21st-century underground music scene in New England and they have garnered an international cult following. Music critic Byron Coley wrote in 2017 that Big Blood had "long been one of the most belovedly strange outfits in the sonic universe revolving around Portland, Maine."

== History ==
=== Formation and early self-released music (2006–2009) ===
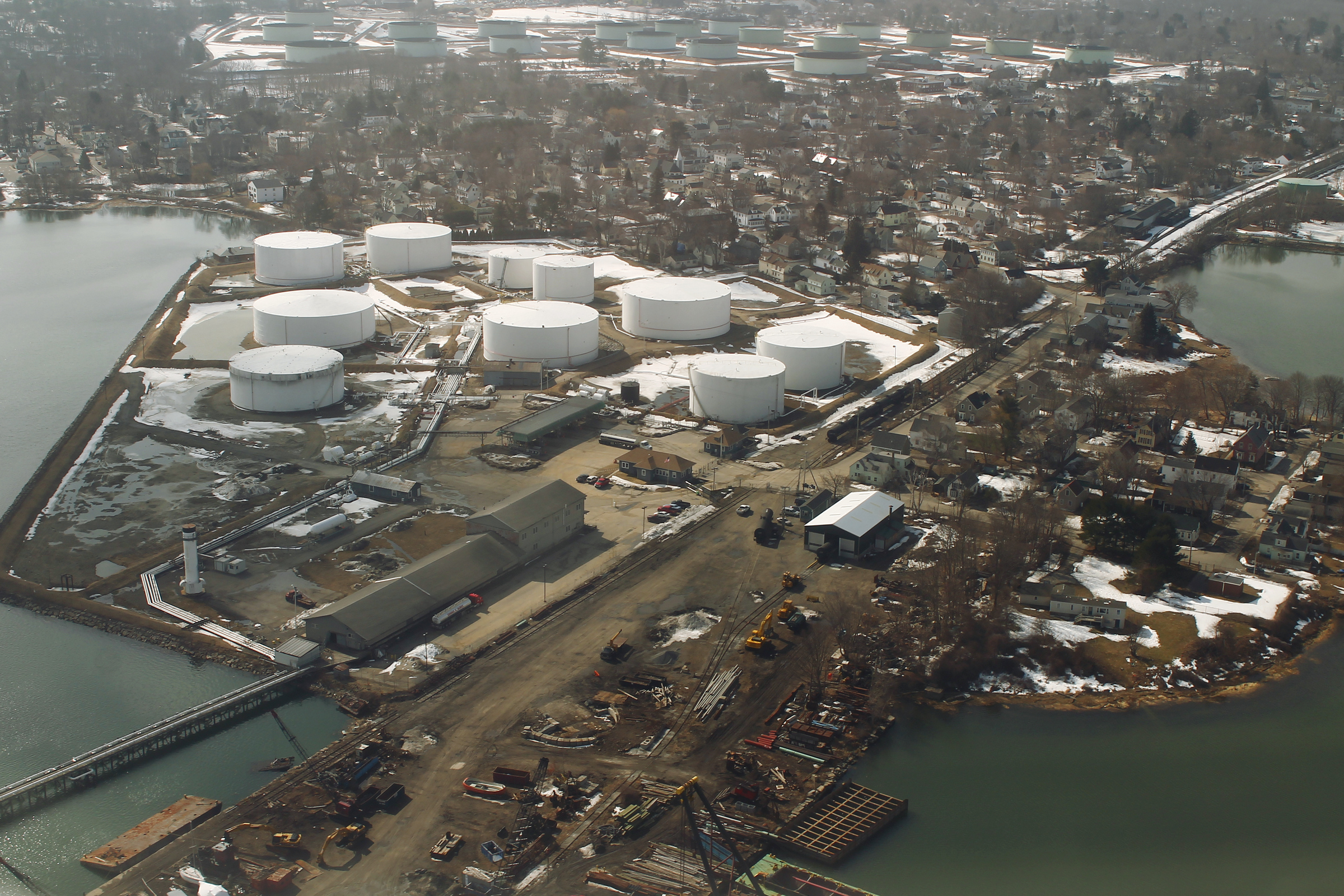
View of oil tanks and residential neighborhoods in South Portland, Maine

In the mid-2000s, Kinsella and Mulkerin lived in a house near oil tanks in South Portland, Maine, with fellow musicians Chriss Sutherland, Micah Blue Smaldone, and Tom Kovacevic; the five cohabitants would later form the band Fire on Fire. Kinsella and Mulkerin formed Big Blood in 2006 shortly after the birth of their daughter, Quinnisa. Raising an infant child conflicted with their demanding practice routine and live performance schedule as members of the band Cerberus Shoal, so they left the group and it dissolved. Nonetheless, the couple wanted to maintain an outlet for their musical creativity. By the time they formed Big Blood, the two had already been songwriting partners for years. Kinsella said the process of writing music with Mulkerin was far more natural than the six-person collaborative process involved with Cerberus Shoal, which she found rewarding but intensely deliberative.

Several of the band's early albums are titled with the name of a venue and a date, suggestive of a live album, although they are in fact home studio recordings. For each of these records, the venue name and date in the title correspond to a concert at which Big Blood debuted a setlist of the same songs. Big Blood self-released their early recordings through their own newly formed DIY label, called Don't Trust the Ruin (typically stylized as "dontrustheruin"), and continued to use the label to issue many of their later works. The band's first albums were distributed as CD-Rs packaged with handmade, screen-printed artwork by Kinsella. The CD-Rs also included inserts like small pieces of art, photography, original flyers promoting their concerts, and other ephemera. Sew Your Wild Days Tour Vol. II contained a mini-comic book created in collaboration with a local artist. In a 2007 interview, Kinsella said they wanted to provide packaging artwork that was personalized, yet inexpensive to produce or purchase. She said Mulkerin had interest in "harkening back to the punk days of photocopied lyrics and art." For their early self-released albums, Antonio Ciarletta of Ondarock identified Big Blood within a rising tendency in underground music toward DIY distribution of homemade, highly limited-edition recordings in formats like CD-R, cassette tape, and MP3 (or other downloadable formats), alongside artists such as Grouper and Natural Snow Buildings.

The band made most of its discography freely available to stream or download via the Free Music Archive, an online repository for royalty-free, Creative Commons–licensed music organized by WFMU. When the Free Music Archive launched in 2008, Big Blood contributed the song "Oh Country" to the compilation album Selected Sounds From the Free Music Archive Vol. 1. Big Blood released two collaborative albums that same year. First, on Big Blood & the Bleedin' Hearts, Kinsella and Mulkerin were backed by "the Bleedin' Hearts", whose members were Kovacevic, Smaldone, and Kelly Nesbitt. Second, they paired with Visitations—another Portland-based duo—on 'Lectric Lashes, consisting of a 7-inch record and a CD-R. 'Lectric Lashes was part of a 12-part, multi-artist series of 7-inches released through the label L'Animaux Tryst.

In 2009, Big Blood self-released another pair of albums: Already Gone I and Already Gone II. In May of that year, Big Blood contributed a track—alongside other psych-folk artists, including Devendra Banhart and Marissa Nadler—to the charity album Leaves of Life, produced by Buck Curran of Arborea, the proceeds of which benefited the World Food Programme and Not on Our Watch. As members of the band Fire on Fire, Kinsella and Mulkerin also participated in the recording of the band's debut album The Orchard, released on Michael Gira's Young God Records in late 2008.

Critical reception of the band's early music was positive. The Boston Phoenix named Big Blood as the best new band from Maine for 2008, and the band was a runner-up for "Best Category-Defining Act" in The Portland Phoenix's 2008 Best Music Poll. "Big Blood," wrote WFMU's Scott Williams, "is clearly in full thrall to whatever demon god of creativity squirrels around under the dirt up there in South Portland, Maine among the loons and the decrepit oil tanks." Williams compared their music to "a trove of musical and folkloric delights that somehow fossilized and disappeared, centuries ago", and said that their work had the capacity to be "intensely and heartbreakingly warm and moving." In a review of their first seven discs of recordings, Justin F. Farrar at Cleveland Scene praised their diverse instrumentation and musicianship, particularly Kinsella's vocal range, and remarked that "the group's muse snorts a ton of meth before commanding [them] to explore everything from chamber popera to Asian folk music to cosmic Appalachia." According to The Brooklyn Rail's Christopher Nelson, their early album Space Gallery Jan. 27, 2007 / Sahara Club Jan. 28, 2007 (referred to as Space Gallery for short) "must be considered one of Big Blood's high points" and stands as "the best representation of the kind of music Big Blood made prior to 2010—sprawling folk music with a sinister sense of backwoods magic".

=== Releases on indie labels and continued prolificacy (2010–2016) ===
External videos
- Behind a Hill – Chapter 9: Big Blood (9:08) – segment on Big Blood from a 2012 documentary about contemporary folk musicians of New England

Kinsella and Mulkerin had discussed plans to release an album on the Portland-based independent label Time-Lag Records since 2007. The label had previously helped distribute copies of the band's early self-released recordings through its website. In 2010, Dead Songs became the band's first album on Time-Lag, and thus their first recording to be distributed through an independent record label rather than their own DIY distribution. At the end of the decade, the Bangor Daily News ranked Dead Songs at no. 25 on its list of the 100 most essential Maine albums of the 2010s.

Their next album, Dark Country Magic, marked their daughter Quinnisa's debut on a Big Blood record with her spoken word performance on the track "Moo-Hoo". Initially self-released on CD-R and cassette, Dark Country Magic was reissued in LP format in 2020 on Cardinal Fuzz/Feeding Tube Records. In a retrospective review for It's Psychedelic Baby! Magazine, Jeff Penczak called it "an occasionally difficult listen" but said "in the proper set and setting (wink! wink!), Big Blood is a grower and their dark country is quite magical!" In Ptolemaic Terrascope, Ian Fraser assessed the album as a "sometimes uneasy yet strangely compelling combination of skewed country, American Gothic and psychedelic moonshine."

Also in 2010, Big Blood released Night Terrors in the Isle of Louis Hardin as a cassette on the label Cabin Floor Esoterica. On Night Terrors—which was reissued as a CD-R in 2014—Big Blood uses sound collage techniques and wordless vocals. In a review for the Portland Press Herald, Kristin DiCara-McClellan described the album as "enchanting, eerie, somewhat tribal feeling and anomalous". The same year, Kinsella and Mulkerin appeared on the album Death Seat by Wooden Wand, which also featured William Tyler (of Lambchop and Silver Jews) and Grasshopper (of Mercury Rev).

The band's next album, Big Blood & The Wicked Hex (2011), was released in LP format on the Greek record label Phase! Records. Based in Athens, Phase! had previously issued a cassette version of the band's early album The Grove. The band marked the release of Wicked Hex with a concert at the Athenian venue Six D.O.G.S., which also hosted an exhibit of Kinsella's art titled "Leviathan Song", exploring the anarchist text Against His-Story, Against Leviathan by Fredy Perlman. The international release gave an indication of the global extent of the band's cult following. With Wicked Hex, Big Blood took a turn toward more electric instrumentation and a more pronounced element of psychedelic drones and riffs. The band continued this stylistic shift on their next album Old Time Primitives, released the following year. For these two records, Big Blood were joined by drummer Shon Mahoney.

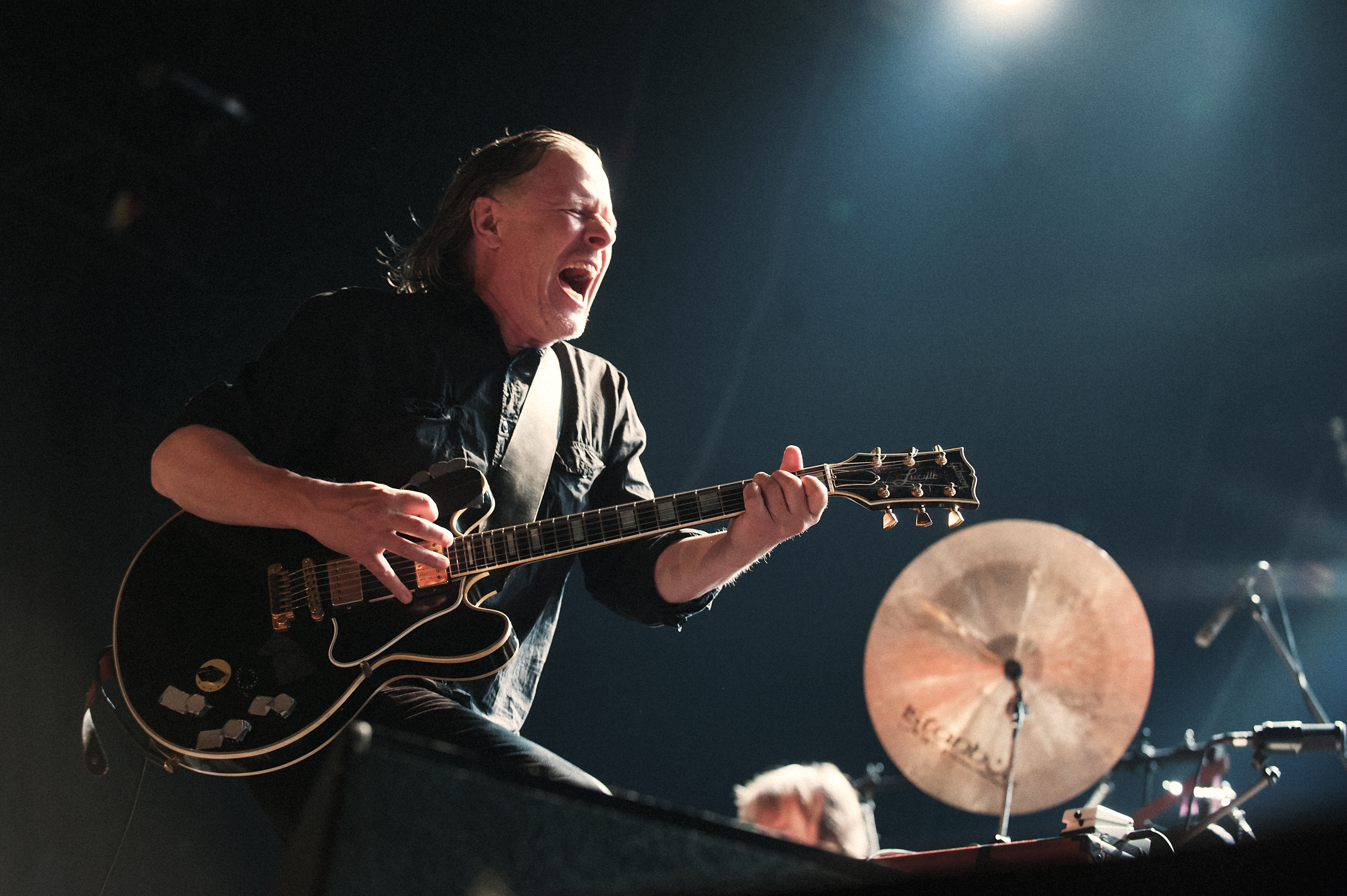
Swans performing live in 2012—the same year Big Blood featured on the band's album The Seer

In 2012, Big Blood released a split album with fellow Maine musician Micah Blue Smaldone on Immune Records. The same year, Kinsella and Mulkerin featured on the Swans album The Seer, which also featured guest appearances from Karen O of Yeah Yeah Yeahs, members of Low, members of Akron/Family, Grasshopper, and Ben Frost, among others. The duo contributed "accordion, vocals, dulcimer, guitar, piano and assorted other instruments" on "The Seer Returns", a track that also included vocals from Jarboe and drumming from Kevin S. McMahon. Big Blood's 2013 album Radio Valkyrie 1905–1917, a double LP released on Feeding Tube Records, is a concept album filled with allusions to the dystopian novel We (1924) by Russian author Yevgeny Zamyatin. Spencer Grady awarded the album a perfect score of five stars in Record Collector, calling it "epic, biblical and totally essential". Critics have described it as a "crowning achievement" and a "masterpiece".

In 2014, Big Blood released the double LP Unlikely Mothers through Blackest Rainbow Records and self-released Fight for Your Dinner Vol. I. In a year-end piece for the website Boston Hassle, Portland-based musician Peter McLaughlin praised Unlikely Mothers as "perhaps the darkest and heaviest batch of transcendent-goddamn-music of their career". Fight for Your Dinner Vol. I collected rarities, alternate versions, and previously unreleased music. The band also made their back catalog available through Bandcamp for the first time in 2014. 2015 saw the release of two new Big Blood albums: Double Days I and Double Days II.

Kinsella joined a collective of visual artists called the Ant Girls—whose other members were Vivien Russe, Rebecca Goodale, and Dorothy Schwartz—to collaborate on a multimedia art exhibition titled "Ant Farm: At the Nexus of Art and Science", which took the leafcutter ant as its subject. Schwartz's husband, the composer Elliott Schwartz, collaborated with Mulkerin to create an ambient soundtrack to accompany the "Ant Farm" exhibition. Dorothy Schwartz died at the age of 75 in March 2014, only a few weeks before the exhibition opened at the Lewiston-Auburn Campus of the University of Southern Maine. Feeding Tube released the soundtrack as an LP titled Ant Farm, credited to Schwartz and Big Blood, in early 2016. Elliott Schwartz died at the age of 80 in December 2016, at which time he was identified in an obituary as "Maine's best-known classical composer".

=== Rise of Quinnisa Rose (2017–present) ===
If you don't know what to believe in anymore, believe in the noise-rock family band of Colleen Kinsella, Caleb Mulkerin and their daughter Quinnisa. ... Big Blood is thicker than water.

— Joe Sweeney in Portland-based news and arts magazine The Bollard

Since 2017, starting with The Daughters Union, Kinsella and Mulkerin's daughter Quinnisa—age 11 at the time of that album's recording—has been featured more prominently on Big Blood albums and gradually become a full-time member of the band. Over the same period, their highly prolific pace of musical output has slowed somewhat.

Big Blood dedicated The Daughters Union to their late collaborator Elliott Schwartz and to Yoko Ono. Initially self-released, The Daughters Union was reissued on vinyl in 2019 by Feeding Tube. Critic Ed Pinsent noted the album's sound tended toward glam rock and praised its "real confidence", "swagger", and "originality". According to a review in The Conway Daily Sun, The Daughters Union "functions more like a proper 'album' than most of the spirited, experimental output in the Big Blood's history." On the other hand, Joe Sweeney of Portland-based outlet The Bollard wrote: "If you think the addition of a child would make this challenging music feel safer, you'd be wrong." Big Blood's 2018 album Operate Spaceship Earth Properly, first released on Feeding Tube, features a riff-heavy psychedelic rock style with electronic percussion and effects, complementing futuristic themes in the lyrics, which reference the ideas of systems theorist Buckminster Fuller and the science fiction of authors Ursula K. Le Guin and Octavia Butler. Also in 2018, they released a split album with Baltimore-based duo Thunder Crutch. The Thunder Crutch split used synthesizers in a style reminiscent of 1970s German "Kosmische Musik".

In December 2019, Big Blood self-released the album Deep Maine, offering a stripped-back and relatively more traditional folk–country sound on a recording of only the band's core duo of Kinsella and Mulkerin. Do You Wanna Have a Skeleton Dream?, released in 2020 on Feeding Tube, marked Quinnisa's first songwriting credits on a Big Blood album. Quinnisa sings either lead or back-up vocals throughout as well as playing drums, trombone, guitar, and bass, while by contrast Mulkerin does not sing on the album and generally makes a less prominent contribution than usual. Bryon Hayes of Exclaim! called the album "quite possibly the most coherent Big Blood record so far, with the most straightforward songwriting", identifying the influence of Motown-style pop while also remarking that there was "still a fair share of the deep-fried Big Blood take on traditional American song form to be found." Bob Boilen of NPR's All Songs Considered called it a "surrealist girl group record" and likened the studio experimentation to the work 1960s producers like Phil Spector and Joe Meek.

Big Blood released a live album and a compilation in 2021. The former was QuaranTunes Series No. 027, a recording of a virtual live performance streamed online via Zoom on October 16, 2020. It was part of a series organized by Feeding Tube Records of similar performances that took place during the COVID-19 pandemic in the United States when many Americans were under lockdown (or "quarantine"). The latter was Fight for Your Dinner Vol. II, a compilation of rare and unreleased material. The same year, Quinnisa sang and played guitar on the debut EP of Florida Man, a rock trio of herself and two other teenage musicians.

== Musical style and influences ==
Big Blood have been regarded as part of the "New Weird America" or "freak folk" movement. A write-up on Big Blood in The Wire noted: "Whether collaborating with friends and family, or digging deep into duo dynamics, they weave a very particular type of mesmerising, esoteric psychedelia, tearing open new channels in the New England folk vernacular." Since its formation in 2006, Big Blood has maintained a highly prolific schedule of record releases. According to Anthony D'Amico of Brainwashed, "some albums are thematically focused conceptual or aesthetic statements and some are just straightforward collections of good songs that harken back to their earlier strain of outsider Americana." In the band's early years, Big Blood described themselves not as a duo, but as a "phantom four piece of Asian Mae, Caleb Mulkerin, Rose Philistine and Colleen Kinsella [who] perform only as a duo". "Asian Mae" and "Rose Philistine" are alter egos used by Kinsella and Mulkerin, respectively.

Sun City Girls were a significant influence on Big Blood, and Kinsella cited their albums Torch of the Mystics and 330,003 Crossdressers From Beyond the Rig Veda as particular favorites of the band. She named Diamanda Galás, Umm Kulthum, Nina Simone, and PJ Harvey as other artists whose music she admires. The band has recorded an eclectic range of covers of others' music, including versions of songs by such artists as Can, Skip James, Syd Barrett, Blondie, Captain Beefheart, the Velvet Underground, Missy Elliott, Bob Seger, The Troggs, and Silver Apples. Their 2020 album Do You Wanna Have a Skeleton Dream? concludes with a duet vocal performance of Franz Schubert's "Ave Maria".

Lady Lamb, a singer-songwriter from Maine, said that "I will ... always be inspired by Big Blood. They astound me. Colleen Kinsella has been a major inspiration to me as someone who weaves her different mediums of art into one tremendous mess of genius." The French duo Natural Snow Buildings, who make psychedelic folk and experimental music, have expressed their fondness for Big Blood.

== Discography ==
External audio
- Big Blood at the Free Music Archive
- Big Blood at the Internet Archive

- Strange Maine 11.04.06 (2006) – DTTR 003
- Strange Maine 1.20.07 (2007) – DTTR 004
- Space Gallery Jan. 27, 2007 / Sahara Club Jan. 28, 2007 (2007) – DTTR 005
- Sew Your Wild Days Tour Vol. 1 (2007) – DTTR 006
- Sew Your Wild Days Tour Vol. II (2007) – DTTR 007
- The Grove (2007) – DTTR 009 / PHR-50
- Already Gone I (2009) – DTTR 013
- Already Gone II (2009) – DTTR 017
- Night Terrors in the Isle of Louis Hardin (2010) – CFE#18 / (2014 reissue) DTTR 022
- Dead Songs (2010) – TIME-LAG 051
- Operators & Things [EP] (2010) – DTTR 023
- Dark Country Magic (2010) – DTTR 027 / (2020 reissue) FTR 543, CFTUL0163
- Big Blood & the Wicked Hex (2011) – PHR-83
- Old Time Primitives (2012) – DTTR 033
- Radio Valkyrie 1905–1917 (2013) – FTR103
- Fight for Your Dinner Vol. I (2014) – DTTR 041
- Unlikely Mothers (2014) – BRR271
- Double Days I (2015) – DTTR 043
- Double Days II (2015) – DTTR 044
- The Daughters Union (2017) – DTTR 050 / FTR 459
- Operate Spaceship Earth Properly (2018) – FTR 385 / DTTR 055
- Deep Maine (2019) – DTTR 057
- Do You Wanna Have a Skeleton Dream? (2020) – FTR500
- QuaranTunes Series No. 027 (2021) – FTR634
- Fight for Your Dinner Vol. II (2021) – DTTR 058
- First Aid Kit (2023)
- Electric Voyeur (2024)

=== Collaborations ===
External audio
- Big Blood & the Bleedin' Hearts (2008) at the Free Music Archive
- Big Blood & Thunder Crutch (2018) at the Free Music Archive

- Big Blood & the Bleedin' Hearts (2008) – with the Bleedin' Hearts (Tom Kovacevic, Micah Blue Smaldone, and Kelly Nesbitt) – DTTR 011
- 'Lectric Lashes (2008) – with Visitations – LTH 707
- Micah Blue Smaldone / Big Blood (2012) – with Micah Blue Smaldone – Immune 021
- "The Seer Returns" (also featuring Jarboe and Kevin McMahon) from The Seer (2012) by Swans
- "Ain't No Hallowed Ground" / "Half-Light Blues" (2015) – split single with Human Adult Band on the A-side – ENO 040
- Ant Farm (2016) – with Elliott Schwartz – FTR241
- Big Blood & Thunder Crutch (2018) – with Thunder Crutch – DTTR 047
