= Dulce (album) =

Soundtrack album by Sun City Girls
- Released: 1998
- Recorded: Palatine and Gravelvoice Studios, Seattle, WA
- Genre: Experimental rock
- Length: 42:29
- Label: Abduction

Sun City Girls chronology
Box of Chameleons (1997)	Dulce (1998)	Singles Volume 1 (2008)

Professional ratings
Review scores
Source	Rating
Allmusic	3/5 stars

Dulce is a soundtrack album composed by American experimental rock band Sun City Girls, released in 1998 by Abduction Records.

== Background ==
According to the album's liner notes written by Alan Bishop, the band received a request in 1995 from a Japanese man, Hachiro Maki, who claimed to be a member of the Japanese doomsday cult Aum Shinrikyo, to produce a soundtrack for his film project about "a secret underground alien base in New Mexico most commonly referred to as Dulce". Next year, during their tour in Japan, the band met the director in Osaka in a temple courtyard. After reviewing rough cuts of the movie, they were given one million yen for their soundtrack services.

== Style ==
As Dean McFarlane of Allmusic writes, the album is stylistically varied "from the spaced-out improvisation and ethnic drone to the cutting electric rock of the Torch of the Mystics era". Behind the "freakish sound" of Dulce, he observes such influences as Zabriskie Point and Ennio Morricone's work from the 1970s.

== Track listing ==
All music is composed by Sun City Girls, except where noted.

Side one
No.	Title	Writer(s)	Length
1.	"Dulce (Main Title)"		3:52
2.	"Electro Bovine Method"	Eyvind Kang, Tatsuya Yoshida	6:08
3.	"Deception Reception"	Jesse Paul Miller	4:24
4.	"Descent to Level Seven"		1:38
5.	"I Won't Come Home (Realization)"		2:49
6.	"Dark Business as Usual"		2:33

Side two
No.	Title	Writer(s)	Length
1.	"Sweet Fatal Reflections"		2:03
2.	"The Victory, Biological"	Eyvind Kang, Tatsuya Yoshida	3:59
3.	"Whirley in the Noose"		1:11
4.	"Dulce (Guitar Theme)"		2:00
5.	"Bobbing the Bloody Vats"		3:10
6.	"Unwind Your DNA"		12:44

== Personnel ==
Adapted from the Dulce liner notes.

Sun City Girls

- Alan Bishop – bass guitar
- Richard Bishop – guitar, recording (4, 7, 9)
- Charles Gocher – drums, percussion

Additional musicians

- Eyvind Kang – electric guitar (2, 8), violin (2, 8)
- Ryuichi Masuda – bass guitar (2, 8), effects (2, 8)
- Jesse Paul Miller – clarinet (3)
- Tatsuya Yoshida – vocals (2, 8), percussion (2, 8)

Production and additional personnel

- Scott Colburn – recording (1–3, 5, 6, 8, 10–12)

== Release history ==
Region	Date	Label	Format	Catalog
United States	1998	Abduction	LP	ABDT010
United States	2007	Abduction	CD	ABDT010
