= Dawn of the Devi =

Studio album by Sun City Girls
- Released: 1991
- Genre: Experimental rock
- Length: 34:07
- Label: Majora
- Producer: Sun City Girls

Sun City Girls chronology
Torch of the Mystics (1990)	Dawn of the Devi (1991)	Bright Surroundings Dark Beginnings (1993)

Dawn of the Devi is the fifth studio album by American experimental rock band Sun City Girls, released in 1991 by Majora Records. It was remastered and reissued in 2019.

== Critical reception ==
Professional ratings
Review scores
Source	Rating
The Encyclopedia of Popular Music	3/5 stars
Spin Alternative Record Guide	8/10

Trouser Press wrote: "There are pieces that stay on an even keel throughout — 'The Court Magicians of Agartha' puts an avant twist on kroncong (an Indonesian form of tango music) — but, for the most part, the album’s hazy insularity (perfectly captured in a sleeve photo that pictures the trio, back to its audience, lost in the throes of an improv high) doesn’t kowtow to stylistic neatniks." Paste wrote that the album "is evidence of three very close friends who have long since mastered the art of jamming on traditional rock tunes together and decided to use their mystical interpersonal connection to aim higher and deeper and weirder." The Spin Alternative Record Guide praised the "hyperkinetic sonic disruption."

== Track listing ==
All music is composed by Sun City Girls.

Side one
No.	Title	Length
1.	"The Kissy Sting"	7:40
2.	"The Court Magicians of Agartha"	4:49
3.	"My Dinner with Rangda"	2:27

Side two
No.	Title	Length
1.	"Cad Walleder"	8:12
2.	"A Target Silhouette Punished Blameless"	9:59

== Personnel ==
Adapted from the Dawn of the Devi liner notes.

Sun City Girls

- Alan Bishop – bass guitar
- Richard Bishop – guitar
- Charles Gocher – drums, percussion

Production and additional personnel

- John Belluzzi – engineering (A1)
- Kevin Crosslin – engineering (B1)
- Marlene Healey – cover art
- Chuck Holder – editing
- Larry Nix – mastering
- David Oliphant – engineering (B2)
- Sun City Girls – mixing, engineering (A2, A3)

== Release history ==
Region	Date	Label	Format	Catalog
United States	1991	Majora	LP	VPAG 5522
