= Funeral Mariachi =

Album by Sun City Girls

Studio album by Sun City Girls
- Released: September 28, 2010
- Recorded: 2006 in Seattle, WA
- Genre: Avant-folk
- Length: 37:13
- Label: Abduction
- Producer: Alan Bishop

Sun City Girls chronology
Singles Volume 2 (2009)	Funeral Mariachi (2010)	Singles Volume 3 (2013)

Funeral Mariachi is the eleventh and final studio album by American experimental rock band Sun City Girls, released on September 28, 2010, by Abduction Records. It comprises recording sessions created in the months prior to the passing of founding member Charles Gocher, who died of cancer on February 19, 2007. The music has been described as the trio's most relaxed and easily accessible.

== Release and reception ==
Professional ratings
Aggregate scores
Source	Rating
Metacritic	82/100
Review scores
Source	Rating
AllMusic	4/5 stars
Christgau’s Consumer Guide	(3-star Honorable Mention)
Consequence of Sound	4/5 stars
Drowned in Sound	7/10
Pitchfork	7.4/10
PopMatters	7/10
Spin	8/10
Tiny Mix Tapes	4.5/5 stars
Uncut	4/5 stars

The album was released to considerable critical acclaim and receiving high marks from established critics such as Robert Christgau, Spin, and Pitchfork Media.

== Track listing ==
All tracks are written by Sun City Girls, except "Come Maddalena" by Ennio Morricone.

No.	Title	Length
1.	"Ben's Radio"	3:04
2.	"The Imam"	4:09
3.	"Black Orchid"	3:05
4.	"This Is My Name"	4:25
5.	"Vine Street Piano (Orchestral)"	3:51
6.	"Blue West"	3:02
7.	"Holy Ground"	4:13
8.	"Mineral Wells"	1:36
9.	"El Solo"	2:48
10.	"Come Maddalena"	3:21
11.	"Funeral Mariachi"	3:39

== Personnel ==
Adapted from the Funeral Mariachi liner notes.

Sun City Girls

- Alan Bishop – bass guitar, electric guitar, acoustic guitar, mandolin, pipe, organ, mellotron, percussion, effects, vocals, production, mixing, recording (2, 3, 6, 9, 11), design
- Richard Bishop – electric guitar, acoustic guitar, bass guitar, piano, organ, vocals
- Charles Gocher – drums, gamelan, gong, percussion

Additional musicians

- Dave Carter – trumpet (11)
- Eyvind Kang – viola (7, 9)
- Jessika Kenney – vocals (3, 5, 9)

Production and additional personnel

- Ed Brooks – mastering
- Scott Colburn – recording, mixing
- Randall Dunn – recording (4, 5)
- Jesse Paul Miller – design
- Sun City Girls – musical arrangements
- Kim Wauters – cover art

== Release history ==
Region	Date	Label	Format	Catalog
United States	2010	Abduction	CD, LP	ABDT045
