= Piasa...Devourer of Men =

Soundtrack album by Sun City Girls
- Released: 1994
- Recorded: November 1993–December 1993
- Studio: Palatine Studio, Seattle, WA
- Genre: Experimental rock
- Length: 41:27
- Label: Abduction
- Producer: Scott Colburn, Sun City Girls

Sun City Girls chronology
Juggernaut (1994)	Piasa...Devourer of Men (1994)	Jacks Creek (1995)

Professional ratings
Review scores
Source	Rating
Pitchfork Media	(7.0/10)

Piasa...Devourer Of Men is a soundtrack album composed by American experimental rock band Sun City Girls, released in 1994 by Abduction Records.

== Track listing ==
All music is composed by Sun City Girls.

Side one
No.	Title	Length
1.	"Thunderbird"	1:37
2.	"Hatchling (Folklore of the Nest)"	2:11
3.	"At the Base of the Mountain of Noise"	4:08
4.	"Warning to Massatoga"	2:58
5.	"The Flying Leather Jackets of Pajarito"	1:23
6.	"Wingspan Eclipse the Moon"	5:40
7.	"Brilliant Pebbles"	1:29
8.	"Nighthunting"	2:17

Side two
No.	Title	Length
1.	"Perhaps One Woman of the Dark"	1:21
2.	"Glowing Red Eyes"	2:39
3.	"Dolores"	2:00
4.	"A Lovely Demon Danced Upon"	1:03
5.	"Struggle Under Talons"	1:43
6.	"A Previously Unknown Sacrifice"	3:14
7.	"Ouatogo's Death Song"	2:30
8.	"17 Mighty Arrows"	1:10
9.	"Lizard Copter"	2:11
10.	"Devourer of Men (Finale)"	1:53

== Personnel ==
Adapted from the Piasa...Devourer of Men liner notes.

Sun City Girls

- Alan Bishop – bass guitar
- Richard Bishop – guitar
- Charles Gocher – drums, percussion

Production and additional personnel

- Scott Colburn – production, engineering
- Sun City Girls – production

== Release history ==
Region	Date	Label	Format	Catalog
United States	1994	Abduction	LP	ABDT003
United States	2007	Abduction	CD	ABDT003
