= Box of Chameleons =

Compilation album by Sun City Girls
- Released: 1997
- Recorded: 1979–1996
- Genre: Experimental rock, free improvisation
- Length: 201:25
- Label: Abduction

Sun City Girls chronology
330,003 Crossdressers From Beyond the Rig Veda (1996)	Box of Chameleons (1997)	Dulce (1998)

Professional ratings
Review scores
Source	Rating
Allmusic	3/5 stars

Box of Chameleons is a three-disc compilation album by American experimental rock band Sun City Girls, released in 1997 by Abduction Records.

== Track listing ==
All tracks are written by Sun City Girls.

Disc one
No.	Title	Length
1.	"Respected for Being Irrespectable"	1:12
2.	"SCG Inc."	0:54
3.	"Vientiene"	2:15
4.	"Priest on the Run"	0:38
5.	"On the Sign"	1:11
6.	"Electrocution"	0:07
7.	"Pinnacle"	0:40
8.	"The Golden Cage"	0:59
9.	"Theme to "Opium Cinema""	1:55
10.	"Criosote Landing"	1:03
11.	"Song for a Dead Breath"	1:15
12.	"Wuthering Corpse"	2:02
13.	"Dogs of Luxor"	0:36
14.	"Entrail – Littered Savannah"	1:39
15.	"Asian Women on the Telephone"	1:27
16.	"Dunderhead"	1:17
17.	"And Once There Was Us"	1:00
18.	"Pitchfork Capitol"	1:06
19.	"Suck-In"	1:35
20.	"The Magic Switch"	1:04
21.	"He's Part-Nickle"	0:48
22.	"A Light-Hearted Comedy"	1:08
23.	"Slash Kick Wrist"	0:06
24.	"Lunar No Sooner"	2:23
25.	"Take a Giant Schmuck"	1:02
26.	"Beauty Rides All Demons"	1:14
27.	"Sun City of Industry"	0:55
28.	"Gayatri"	0:50
29.	"Flippin' the Bird"	1:10
30.	"Neverglades"	1:35
31.	"High Drama Llama"	0:50
32.	"Coffee With Eyelash"	1:05
33.	"You Tell Me"	0:35
34.	"Cuts on Phantom Limbo"	1:16
35.	"Trailor Therapy"	2:20
36.	"Viola Madre"	2:20
37.	"Insect"	1:55
38.	"Interlude"	0:53
39.	"Swindler's Fist"	0:59
40.	"Nova Expression No. 3"	2:14
41.	"Tribute to Sonny Murray"	0:46
42.	"Enough!"	0:55
43.	"The Space Genie Hiss"	0:53
44.	"Clickety-Clack Go the Arterial Tracks"	0:58
45.	"Law of Diminished Returns"	1:43
46.	"It's Ours" (reprise)	1:08
47.	"We'll Still Be Hovering After You're Gonesville"	2:06
48.	"March on Atlas"	1:06
49.	"Mama's Mild (Too Dry)"	1:18
50.	"Thanks a Lot, Cerebral Man"	1:27

Disc two
No.	Title	Length
1.	"Suncitivity"	0:54
2.	"Prison Quality Food"	1:56
3.	"Wary of It All"	1:37
4.	"Nine Sides of Air"	1:46
5.	"Yellow Fever"	3:13
6.	"Your Amuckness"	1:39
7.	"Impersonal Tragedy"	1:03
8.	"Next to No Way"	2:26
9.	"Kuda Kepang"	1:50
10.	"Bad Housekeeping"	0:38
11.	"Tribute to Liberace"	2:49
12.	"Miss Majestic"	1:34
13.	"Eddie, Is That the Blue Moon?"	1:10
14.	"Surfin' the Cardboard Stretcher"	1:07
15.	"Vomiting Diamonds"	0:57
16.	"Everything Burnt 'Cept the Navel"	1:25
17.	"Ode to Ganesh"	1:41
18.	"Indians, Jacks, and Pines"	1:05
19.	"Bad Daylight"	1:39
20.	"The Brickyard"	2:44
21.	"I Deal a Stick"	1:17
22.	"The Doldrums"	0:58
23.	"They Wanted to Dance – We Gave Em This"	1:49
24.	"Mood Bazaar"	3:05
25.	"Lubricated Forays"	0:25
26.	"Doorknob Journalism"	1:22
27.	"Is It Stroked?"	0:15
28.	"Girl Trouble"	0:21
29.	"Sprinkling the Demon Seed"	1:07
30.	"Neptune Breeze"	2:03
31.	"Indian Graveyard"	1:02
32.	"The Palestine Club Half-Way House Scene"	2:18
33.	"Tobacco Bong Hits"	1:06
34.	"Clown Prince"	1:40
35.	"Amethyst Nightgown"	2:49
36.	"A Random Finale"	2:25
37.	"Plecostamus"	2:08
38.	"Toba Hightop"	2:19
39.	"Lifting the Hemline of the Unknown"	2:21
40.	"A Photogenic Memory"	0:59
41.	"Bobby Sands"	1:30
42.	"The Eleven, Oh Nine in the Refrigerator, South Farmer"	1:55
43.	"The Crowbar of Illusion"	2:52
44.	"The Big Purr"	1:02
45.	"A Throne's Stow"	0:19

Disc three
No.	Title	Length
1.	"Sun City Girls From Ipanema"	2:14
2.	"Trust Me?"	2:25
3.	"Zealous Island"	2:19
4.	"Death in Yellowknife"	4:19
5.	"Overseer"	2:27
6.	"Ajax Floodlamp"	2:46
7.	"The Fog Hotel Swindle"	2:18
8.	"Cooking With Satan"	1:57
9.	"I Mean, I'm New to Her School"	1:41
10.	"Three Blind Dice"	3:04
11.	"Powell & Market"	2:13
12.	"Rodent With a View"	1:44
13.	"Ojibway"	1:36
14.	"Brockway Roller Rink"	0:41
15.	"Moonflower Power"	3:39
16.	"Tweakscape"	2:40
17.	"My Daughter"	1:59
18.	"Yemen Dagger Architect"	2:26
19.	"The Third-Eye Mood Ring Medallion"	1:26
20.	"A Blessed Removal"	2:39
21.	"Big Game"	1:45
22.	"I Project Euphemy"	1:04
23.	"Zeke Cambridge"	0:23
24.	"The Apology"	1:08
25.	"5th & Mill"	2:36
26.	"Way Left North Out"	2:41
27.	"I Hear It's the Best"	1:22
28.	"Nights of Orange"	1:39
29.	"Shilton"	1:17
30.	"Theme 5"	1:27
31.	"Broken Circuit of Love"	1:12
32.	"Parade Aglow"	2:55
33.	"Caterpiller"	1:50

== Personnel ==
Adapted from the Box of Chameleons liner notes.

Sun City Girls

- Alan Bishop – bass guitar, vocals
- Richard Bishop – guitar, vocals
- Charles Gocher – drums, percussion, vocals

Production and additional personnel

- Scott Colburn – recording, editing
- Wade Olson – recording
- Manford Cain – recording
- Sun City Girls – musical arrangement, production, recording

== Release history ==
Region	Date	Label	Format	Catalog
United States	1997	Abduction	CD	ABDT009
