= Grotto of Miracles =

Studio album by Sun City Girls
- Released: 1986
- Recorded: April 1985
- Studios: Radical, Tempe, AZ
- Genres: Experimental rock, psychedelic rock
- Length: 42:40
- Label: Placebo PLA-19

Sun City Girls chronology
Sun City Girls (1984)	Grotto of Miracles (1986)	Horse Cock Phepner (1987)

Grotto of Miracles is the second studio album by the American experimental rock band Sun City Girls. It was released in 1986 by Placebo Records. Like many of the band's LPs, Grotto of Miracles has since become a collector's item.

== Critical reception ==
Professional ratings
Review scores
Source	Rating
AllMusic	3/5 stars
The Encyclopedia of Popular Music	3/5 stars
Spin Alternative Record Guide	8/10

Trouser Press wrote: "With demented lyrical concepts and such offbeat accessories as antelope bells, chimes and temple blocks, Grotto of Miracles is an ethnic stew that shows enormous creative growth." The Chicago Reader wrote that the band's "wiggy instrumentals were flavored by surf rock, jazz, and noise, and would give way to pummeling art rock, nonsensical rants, and meandering improvisation." Perfect Sound Forever praised the "beautiful, Rick [Bishop]-heavy, unusually near-accessible first side." Maximum Rocknroll called the album "very musical, poetic, downright pretty, distinctively ugly, the great acid experience or background music."

== Track listing ==
All tracks are written by Sun City Girls, except "Kal el Lazi Kad Ham", which is a traditional arrangement.

Side one
No.	Title	Length
1.	"Radio Morocco"	5:00
2.	"Different Kind of Whore"	4:24
3.	"In a Lesbian Meadow"	2:17
4.	"Swing of Kings"	2:05
5.	"Damcar"	2:40
6.	"Kal el Lazi Kad Ham"	5:28

Side two
No.	Title	Length
1.	"Black Weather Shoes"	1:13
2.	"Mama's Milk (Too Dry)"	1:00
3.	"The Spice Nest"	5:17
4.	"Frankincense and Fish"	4:00
5.	"The Mystery of Death"	3:15
6.	"Ask Heem (202 456 7369)"	4:50
7.	"It's My Old Friend the Future"	1:16

== Personnel ==
Adapted from the Grotto of Miracles liner notes.

Sun City Girls

- Alan Bishop – bass guitar, melodica, autoharp, alto saxophone, trumpet, tape, percussion, vocals
- Richard Bishop – electric guitar, lap steel guitar, piano, keyboards, organ, melodica, cello, violin, flute, bells, percussion, vocals
- Charles Gocher – drums, percussion, temple block, bells, chimes, cymbal, gong, güiro, maracas, tambourine, autoharp, flute, horns, vocals

Production and additional personnel

- Tom Connell – engineering, mixing
- Joseph Cultice – photography
- David Oliphant – mixing
- Wade Olson – engineering
- Peggy Slinger – cover art
- Sun City Girls – mixing, design

== Release history ==
Region	Date	Label	Format	Catalog
United States	1986	Placebo	LP	PLA-19
