= Horse Cock Phepner =

Studio album by Sun City Girls
- Released: 1987
- Genre: Experimental rock
- Length: 44:54
- Label: Placebo

Sun City Girls chronology
Grotto of Miracles (1986)	Horse Cock Phepner (1987)	Torch of the Mystics (1990)

Professional ratings
Review scores
Source	Rating
AllMusic	3/5 stars

Horse Cock Phepner is the third studio album by American experimental rock band Sun City Girls, released in 1987 by Placebo Records.

== Track listing ==
All tracks are written by Sun City Girls, except where noted otherwise.

Side one
No.	Title	Length
1.	"Horse Cock Phepner"	2:09
2.	"Voice of America No. 1"	0:19
3.	"Nancy"	5:59
4.	"Esta Susan en casa?"	1:20
5.	"Aristocrats of Impertinence"	0:34
6.	"It's Underneath the House"	2:19
7.	"I Protect You from Me"	1:03
8.	"Without Compare"	8:35

Side two
No.	Title	Writer(s)	Length
1.	"CIA Man"	Sun City Girls, Tuli Kupferberg	4:15
2.	"Dreamland"		1:03
3.	"Porno Shop"		8:35
4.	"Voice of America No. 2"		4:15
5.	"Eyeball in a Quart Jar of Snot"		3:51
6.	"Passenger Seat People"		3:39
7.	"Saint Bernard's Observation Booth"		1:21
8.	"Kill the Klansmen"		3:38
9.	"Cloaven Radio"		2:15

== Personnel ==
Adapted from the Horse Cock Phepner liner notes.

Sun City Girls

- Alan Bishop – bass guitar, vocals
- Richard Bishop – guitar, vocals
- Charles Gocher – drums, percussion, vocals

== Release history ==
Region	Date	Label	Format	Catalog
United States	1987	Placebo	CS, LP	PLA 024

== See also ==
- Ronald Reagan in music
