= Jacks Creek (album) =

Studio album by Sun City Girls
- Released: 1995
- Recorded: 1994
- Studio: Palatine, Seattle, WA
- Genre: Avant-folk, spoken word
- Length: 38:24
- Label: Abduction
- Producer: Scott Colburn, Sun City Girls

Sun City Girls chronology
Piasa...Devourer of Men (1994)	Jacks Creek (1995)	Dante's Disneyland Inferno (1996)

Professional ratings
Review scores
Source	Rating
AllMusic	2.5/5 stars
Pitchfork Media	2.0/10

Jacks Creek is the eighth studio album by American experimental rock band Sun City Girls, released in 1995 by Abduction Records.

== Track listing ==
All tracks are written by Sun City Girls.

Side one
No.	Title	Length
1.	"Gurnam"	11:43
2.	"Bubblin' Greenery"	6:38

Side two
No.	Title	Length
1.	"Useless Stillborn"	2:45
2.	"Pork Floozle"	1:22
3.	"Fact the Business"	2:31
4.	"Double Suicide Over a Saddle"	2:51
5.	"Jazz Music of the Civil War"	3:56
6.	"A Chase Through Sweet Lips"	3:21
7.	"Jacks Creek"	3:17

== Personnel ==
Adapted from the Jacks Creek liner notes.

Sun City Girls

- Alan Bishop – bass guitar, vocals
- Richard Bishop – guitar, vocals
- Charles Gocher – drums, percussion, vocals

Production and additional personnel

- Scott Colburn – production, engineering
- Sun City Girls – production

== Release history ==
Region	Date	Label	Format	Catalog
United States	1995	Abduction	LP	ABDT006
United States	2007	Abduction	CD	ABDT006
