= Eye Mohini (Sun City Girls Singles Volume 3) =

Compilation album by Sun City Girls
- Released: March 19, 2013
- Recorded: 1987–1993
- Genre: Avant-folk, psychedelic rock
- Length: 48:27
- Label: Abduction

Sun City Girls chronology
Funeral Mariachi (2010)	Eye Mohini (Sun City Girls Singles Volume 3) (2013)

Professional ratings
Review scores
Source	Rating
Allmusic	4/5 stars
PopMatters	(7/10)

Eye Mohini (Sun City Girls Singles Volume 3) is a compilation album by American experimental rock band Sun City Girls, released on March 19, 2013 by Abduction Records. It comprises tracks previously released as singles and on various artists compilation albums.

== Track listing ==
No.	Title	Length
1.	"Sun Damaged My Ass"	0:30
2.	"Eye Mohini"	2:19
3.	"Gum Arabic"	1:28
4.	"Lemur's Urine"	1:58
5.	"Abydos"	2:19
6.	"Carousel Tapsel"	2:29
7.	"Borungku si derita"	5:00
8.	"It's Ours"	2:19
9.	"Kickin' the Dragon"	3:17
10.	"Kal el lazi kad ham"	6:45
11.	"Rose Room"	1:10
12.	"Smile"	2:46
13.	"Esoterica of Abyssynia"	5:00
14.	"Soar / The Flower"	10:27

== Personnel ==
Adapted from the Eye Mohini (Sun City Girls Singles Volume 3) liner notes.

Sun City Girls

- Alan Bishop – bass guitar, acoustic guitar, electric guitar, vocals
- Richard Bishop – electric guitar, acoustic guitar, lap steel guitar, vocals
- Charles Gocher – drums, percussion, vocals

Production and additional personnel

- Scott Colburn – recording
- Tom Connell – recording
- Eddy Detroit – congas
- Sun City Girls – recording, design
- Kate Widdows – design

== Release history ==
Region	Date	Label	Format	Catalog
United States	2013	Abduction	CD	ABDT049
