= Kaliflower =

Studio album by Sun City Girls
- Released: 1993
- Genre: Experimental rock
- Length: 41:59
- Label: Abduction
- Producer: Scott Colburn, Sun City Girls

Sun City Girls chronology
Valentines From Matahari (1993)	Kaliflower (1993)	Juggernaut (1994)

Kaliflower is the seventh studio album by American experimental rock band Sun City Girls, released in 1993 by Abduction Records.

== Track listing ==
All music is composed by Sun City Girls.

No.	Title	Length
1.	"X+Y=Fuck You"	4:37
2.	"Dead Chick in the River"	4:22
3.	"And So the Dead Tongue Sang"	6:44
4.	"Cigar Shaped the Moonlight"	2:55
5.	"Archaeoptryx in the Slammer"	2:15
6.	"The Venerable Uncle Tompa"	16:51
7.	"I Knew a Jew Named Frankenstein"	4:15

== Personnel ==
Adapted from the Kaliflower liner notes.

Sun City Girls

- Alan Bishop – bass guitar
- Richard Bishop – guitar
- Charles Gocher – drums, percussion

Additional musicians

- Jesse Srogoncik – guitar (2)
- Surawong Pop Minstrels – vocals (5)
- Wat Chana Songkram Drummers – drums (6)

Production and additional personnel

- Scott Colburn – production, mastering, mixing (5, 6)
- Kevin Crosslin – recording (4)
- Marty Lester – mixing (6)
- Stephen Mikulka – recording (2)
- Sun City Girls – production, mastering, mixing (1–5, 7)

== Release history ==
Region	Date	Label	Format	Catalog
United States	1993	Abduction	CD, LP	ABDT001
