= Sun City Girls (album) =

Studio album by Sun City Girls
- Released: 1984
- Recorded: Cereus and Desert Sounds, Phoenix, AZ
- Genre: Experimental rock, noise rock, avant-garde jazz
- Length: 40:39
- Label: Placebo
- Producer: The Cat, Greg Hynes, Tony Victor

Sun City Girls chronology
Sun City Girls (1984)	Grotto of Miracles (1986)

Professional ratings
Review scores
Source	Rating
AllMusic	3/5 stars

Sun City Girls is the eponymously titled debut studio album of American experimental rock band Sun City Girls, released in 1984 by Placebo Records.

== Track listing ==
All tracks are written by Sun City Girls, except "Helwa Shak" which is a traditional arrangement.

Side one
No.	Title	Length
1.	"Caravan of Scars"	3:55
2.	"Uncle Jim"	3:20
3.	"Hitman Boy"	2:08
4.	"Jokers on a Waltz"	2:36
5.	"Rubber Stamp Icons (Of You)"	2:06
6.	"The Burning Nerve Ending Magic Trick"	2:41
7.	"Black Tent"	2:22

Side two
No.	Title	Length
1.	"561B (For Alexis)"	1:00
2.	"Rappin' Head"	2:31
3.	"My Painted Tomb"	1:53
4.	"Trippin' on Krupa"	1:48
5.	"Metaphors in a Mixmaster"	3:45
6.	"Your Bible Set Off My Smoke Alarm"	1:04
7.	"Helwa Shak"	3:43
8.	"Moment of a Million Lands"	1:54
9.	"Woman in Mourning"	2:58
10.	"Vomiting Diamonds"	0:56

== Personnel ==
Adapted from the Sun City Girls liner notes.

Sun City Girls

- Alan Bishop – bass guitar, guitar, alto saxophone, trumpet, dulcimer, tape, percussion, vocals
- Richard Bishop – lap steel guitar, piano, organ, melodica, flute, percussion
- Charles Gocher – drums, horns, guitar, percussion, bongos, güiro, bells, triangle, whistle, xylophone, vocals

Production and additional personnel

- Tom Barnes – engineering
- The Cat – production
- Greg Hynes – production
- Sandy Lamont – engineering
- M.A.C. – cover art
- Sun City Girls – mixing
- Tony Victor – production
- Jeff Wetherby – engineering

== Release history ==
Region	Date	Label	Format	Catalog
United States	1984	Placebo	LP	PLA 701
