= Juggernaut (Sun City Girls album) =

Soundtrack album by Sun City Girls
- Released: 1994
- Recorded: November 1993–December 1993
- Studio: Palatine Studio, Seattle, WA
- Genre: Experimental rock
- Length: 42:29
- Label: Abduction
- Producer: Scott Colburn, Sun City Girls

Sun City Girls chronology
Kaliflower (1993)	Juggernaut (1994)	Piasa...Devourer of Men (1994)

Professional ratings
Review scores
Source	Rating
Pitchfork Media	(5.5/10)

Juggernaut is a soundtrack album composed by American experimental rock band Sun City Girls, released in 1994 by Abduction Records.

== Track listing ==
All music is composed by Sun City Girls.

Side one
No.	Title	Length
1.	"Gravelhead"	7:04
2.	"Outskirts of the Possible"	6:19
3.	"My Friend Nothing (Main Title)"	2:36
4.	"Bird in a Grave"	3:48
5.	"Life Expectancy of a Fly"	1:10

Side two
No.	Title	Length
1.	"Expendable City"	5:47
2.	"Spatial Retreat"	3:28
3.	"Cloudbuster"	2:43
4.	"The Darkest Look"	2:19
5.	"Among All Flat"	7:15

== Personnel ==
Adapted from the Juggernaut liner notes.

Sun City Girls

- Alan Bishop – bass guitar
- Richard Bishop – guitar
- Charles Gocher – drums, percussion

Production and additional personnel

- Scott Colburn – production, engineering
- Sun City Girls – production

== Release history ==
Region	Date	Label	Format	Catalog
United States	1994	Abduction	LP	ABDT002
United States	2007	Abduction	CD	ABDT002
