= Bright Surroundings Dark Beginnings =

Live album by Sun City Girls
- Released: 1993
- Genre: Psychedelic rock, avant-folk
- Length: 46:44
- Label: Majora
- Producer: Sun City Girls

Sun City Girls chronology
Dawn of the Devi (1991)	Bright Surroundings Dark Beginnings (1993)	Valentines From Matahari (1993)

Professional ratings
Review scores
Source	Rating
Allmusic	4/5 stars

Bright Surroundings Dark Beginnings is a live performance album by American experimental rock band Sun City Girls, released in 1993 by Majora Records.

== Track listing ==
All music is composed by Sun City Girls.

Side one
No.	Title	Length
1.	"The Venerable Song (The Meaning of Which Is No Longer Known)"	22:12

Side two
No.	Title	Length
1.	"Omani Red Light"	12:14
2.	"The Multiple Hallucinations of an Assassin"	12:18

== Personnel ==
Adapted from the Bright Surroundings Dark Beginnings liner notes.

Sun City Girls

- Alan Bishop – bass guitar
- Richard Bishop – guitar
- Charles Gocher – drums, percussion

Production and additional personnel

- Wade Olson – recording
- Sun City Girls – recording

== Release history ==
Region	Date	Label	Format	Catalog
United States	1993	Majora	LP	VPAG-5732
United States	1998	Majora	CD	MAJ 7002
