= Valentines From Matahari =

Studio album by Sun City Girls
- Released: 1993
- Genre: Experimental rock
- Length: 46:57
- Label: Majora
- Producer: Sun City Girls

Sun City Girls chronology
Bright Surroundings Dark Beginnings (1993)	Valentines From Matahari (1993)	Kaliflower (1993)

Professional ratings
Review scores
Source	Rating
Allmusic	4/5 stars

Valentines From Matahari is the sixth studio album by American experimental rock band Sun City Girls, released in 1993 by Majora Records.

== Track listing ==
All music is composed by Sun City Girls.

Side one
No.	Title	Length
1.	"Black Tent"	7:24
2.	"Helicopters in a Vacuum"	2:23
3.	"On the Sign"	1:43
4.	"Way Over the Rainbow"	5:00
5.	"Caravan of Scars"	3:53

Side two
No.	Title	Length
1.	"Sev Acher"	2:38
2.	"Spark Chuckle Mustard"	4:54
3.	"Metaphors in a Mixmaster"	6:09
4.	"Levitating Orchards"	2:33
5.	"Caveat Emptor"	3:39
6.	"Circus Haddam"	6:41

== Personnel ==
Adapted from the Valentines From Matahari liner notes.

Sun City Girls

- Alan Bishop – bass guitar
- Richard Bishop – guitar
- Charles Gocher – drums, percussion

== Release history ==
Region	Date	Label	Format	Catalog
United States	1993	Majora	LP	VPAG-5765
United States	1998	Majora	CD	MAJ 70011
