= You're Never Alone With a Cigarette (Sun City Girls Singles Volume 1) =

You're Never Alone with a Cigarette (Sun City Girls Singles Volume 1)

Compilation album by Sun City Girls
- Released: March 4, 2008
- Recorded: September 1987 – July 1988
- Genre: Experimental rock
- Length: 39:16
- Label: Abduction

Sun City Girls chronology
Dulce (1998)	You're Never Alone with a Cigarette (Sun City Girls Singles Volume 1) (2008)	Singles Volume 2 (2009)

Professional ratings
Review scores
Source	Rating
AllMusic	4/5 stars
Pitchfork Media	8.2/10
PopMatters	3/10

You're Never Alone with a Cigarette (Sun City Girls Singles Volume 1) is a compilation album by American experimental rock band Sun City Girls, released on March 4, 2008, by Abduction Records. It comprises tracks previously released as singles and on various artists compilation albums.

== Track listing ==
No.	Title	Writer(s)	Length
1.	"100 Pounds of Black Olives"	Sun City Girls	5:10
2.	"Sev Acher"	Artie Barsamian	3:12
3.	"Souvenirs From Jangare"	Sun City Girls	4:20
4.	"Plaster Cupids Falling From the Ceiling"	Sun City Girls	6:47
5.	"Amazon One"	Traditional arr.	2:56
6.	"The Beauty of Benghazi"	Alan Bishop	1:32
7.	"Wild World of Animals"	Gerhard Trede	2:33
8.	"Harmful Little Armful" (for Will Shatter)	Charles Gocher	0:45
9.	"The Fine-Tuned Machines of Lemuria"	Sun City Girls	12:01

== Personnel ==
Adapted from the You're Never Alone With a Cigarette (Sun City Girls Singles Volume 1) liner notes.

Sun City Girls

- Alan Bishop – bass guitar, acoustic guitar, reeds, vocals
- Richard Bishop – electric guitar
- Charles Gocher – drums, percussion

Production and additional personnel

- John Belluzzi – recording (9)
- Scott Colburn – mastering, mixing
- Eric Lanzillotta – design
- Sun City Girls – recording (1–8)

== Release history ==
Region	Date	Label	Format	Catalog
United States	2008	Abduction	CD	ABDT040
