= Napoleon & Josephine (Sun City Girls Singles Volume 2) =

Compilation album by Sun City Girls
- Released: April 14, 2009
- Recorded: July 1985 – December 1997
- Genre: Experimental rock, avant-folk
- Length: 62:05
- Label: Abduction

Sun City Girls chronology
Singles Volume 1 (2008)	Napoleon & Josephine (Sun City Girls Singles Volume 2) (2009)	Funeral Mariachi (2010)

Professional ratings
Review scores
Source	Rating
AllMusic	(unrated)

Napoleon & Josephine (Sun City Girls Singles Volume 2) is a compilation album by American experimental rock band Sun City Girls, released on April 14, 2009 by Abduction Records. It comprises tracks previously released as singles and on various artists compilation albums.

== Track listing ==
All tracks are written by Sun City Girls.

No.	Title	Length
1.	"The Rhinemaiden's Palatial Mountain Retreat"	1:39
2.	"Prick of the World"	1:44
3.	"Sleazy Nashville"	3:47
4.	"Eyeball in a Quart Jar of Snot"	4:03
5.	"The Weatherman"	3:07
6.	"Voice of America No. 3"	0:32
7.	"Insignificanto"	2:30
8.	"A Wake"	1:04
9.	"Kaspar Hauser"	2:55
10.	"The Bearded Hermes"	4:32
11.	"Encyclopedia Vomitanica"	1:13
12.	"Napoleon & Josephine"	12:50
13.	"Reflection of a Young Boy Eating From a Can of Dog Food on a Shiny Red X-Mas Ball"	22:09

== Personnel ==
Adapted from the Napoleon & Josephine (Sun City Girls Singles Volume 2) liner notes.

Sun City Girls

- Alan Bishop – bass guitar, acoustic guitar, flute, percussion, effects, vocals
- Richard Bishop – electric guitar, acoustic guitar, piano, organ, flute, vocals
- Charles Gocher – drums, percussion, flute, effects, vocals

Production and additional personnel

- Wm. Berger – recording (10)
- Scott Colburn – mastering, mixing (5, 7–9, 11, 12), recording (7, 9)
- Kevin Crosslin – recording (8)
- Eric Lanzillotta – design
- David Oliphant – recording (13), mixing (13), effects (13)
- Wade Olson – recording (2, 3)
- Sun City Girls – recording (1, 4–6, 11, 12)

== Release history ==
Region	Date	Label	Format	Catalog
United States	2009	Abduction	CD	ABDT043
