= 330,003 Crossdressers from Beyond the Rig Veda =

330,003 Crossdressers From Beyond the Rig Veda

Studio album by Sun City Girls
- Released: 1996
- Genre: Experimental rock, avant-folk
- Length: 127:01
- Label: Abduction

Sun City Girls chronology
Dante's Disneyland Inferno (1996)	330,003 Crossdressers From Beyond the Rig Veda (1996)	Box of Chameleons (1997)

Professional ratings
Review scores
Source	Rating
Allmusic	4/5 stars

330,003 Crossdressers From Beyond the Rig Veda is the tenth studio album by American experimental rock band Sun City Girls, released in 1996 by Abduction Records.

== Track listing ==
All tracks are written by Sun City Girls, except where noted.

Disc one
No.	Title	Writer(s)	Length
1.	"Civet's Tango"		2:56
2.	"CCC"		4:15
3.	"Apna Desh"	Traditional arr.	4:42
4.	"Rookoobay"	Traditional arr.	3:45
5.	"Cruel and Thin"	Traditional arr.	3:39
6.	"Sardhama Royale"		2:26
7.	"Sikya Boyah"		3:27
8.	"Soi Cowboy"	Traditional arr.	2:21
9.	"Kickin' the Dragon"		4:59
10.	"Murderers Night"		2:52
11.	"Diamond Macaque"		1:56
12.	"Theme From "Sangkala""	Traditional arr.	2:10
13.	"Insect Dilemma"		1:14
14.	"Delong Song"		3:48
15.	"Kumari Sweet"		6:07
16.	"Lies Up the Niger"		6:42

Disc two
No.	Title	Length
1.	"Cineraria Blue"	8:35
2.	"Shin Paku"	7:03
3.	"Candi Sukuh"	3:28
4.	"Ghost Ghat Trespass / Sussmeier"	34:22
5.	"Vimana of the Twilight"	7:05
6.	"Theme From "The Swaying Gardens Of Apocalypsia""	3:37
7.	"Maybe I'll Kiss and Die a Fool (Finale)"	5:32

== Personnel ==
Adapted from the 330,003 Crossdressers From Beyond the Rig Veda liner notes.

Sun City Girls

- Alan Bishop – bass guitar, 6-string bass guitar, electric guitar, banjo, mandolin, gamelan, balalaika, flute, cello, melodica, bells, harmonica, tape, effects, percussion
- Richard Bishop – electric guitar, lap steel guitar, acoustic guitar, mandolin, banjo, piano, organ, flute, horns, gong, gamelan, percussion
- Charles Gocher – drums, bongos, shakers, wood block, percussion, autoharp, bells, gong, gamelan, effects, vocals

Production and additional personnel

- Scott Colburn – recording, mixing, editing, gamelan (1.6, 1.14, 2.3, 2.4), percussion (1.1, 1.16), piano (1.7, 1.10), ukulele (1.1), DX7 synthesizer (1.12), vocals (1.13), effects (2.5)
- Eyvind Kang – violin (2.4), musical arrangements (2.4)
- Wade Olson – recording (1.3)
- Sun City Girls – recording, cover art

== Release history ==
Region	Date	Label	Format	Catalog
United States	1996	Abduction	CD	ABDT008
United States	2002	Locust Music	LP	LOCUST 04
Italy	2010	Get Back	LP	GET 718
