= Cerberus Shoal =

American rock band

- Origin: Boston, Massachusetts, USA
- Genres: Experimental rock, freak folk, emo, post-rock
- Years active: 1994–mid-2000s
- Labels: Tree Roots, Temporary Residence Limited, North East Indie Records
- Spinoffs: Big Blood, Fire on Fire, Tarpigh
- Members: Caleb Mulkerin; Chriss Sutherland; Tom Rogers
- Past members: Erin Davidson; Karl Greenwald; Colleen Kinsella; Tim Morin; Josh Ogden; Kristen Hedges; Tim Folland; David Mulder; Thomas Kovacevic; Tim Harbeson; Eric LaPerna

Cerberus Shoal was an American rock band formed in 1994 in Boston but largely based in Portland, Maine. They split up in the mid-2000s with some members going on to form Big Blood and Fire on Fire.

== History ==
The band's initial line-up was Caleb Mulkerin (guitar), Josh Ogden (guitar), Chriss Sutherland (bass guitar, vocals), and Tom Rogers (drums). They took their name from an old book of poems that students at Brown University had written in 1893. This name indirectly references an underwater feature in the Block Island Sound.

After their first, self-titled release in 1995, Kristen Hedges replaced Ogden on guitar and vocals, and David Mulder was added on keyboards and percussion. The new line-up released two Lighthouse in Athens EPs in 1996 and the album ...and Farewell to Hightide in 1997, now having abandoned their earlier punk/psychedelic rock style for a more progressive rock sound that was described as "soundtrack-rock", and "quite simple [arrangements], featuring subtle percussion, occasional horns, and layers of guitars and keyboards".

Hedges left in late 1997, and Mulder left the following year. Thomas Kovacevic then joined on guitar, quena, oud, zamponas and vocals, Eric Laperna on percussion and vocals and Tim Harbeson on keyboards, accordion, flute, shakuhachi and trumpet, all three concurrently of the band Tarpigh. Their 1998 album Elements of Structure/Permanence comprised two long tracks originally intended as soundtracks to short films by Tim Folland, and improvised and recorded while watching the films. Homb was released in 1999, showing another stylistic shift towards more atmospheric music, drawing comparisons with early Pink Floyd, Popol Vuh, and Godspeed You! Black Emperor. This continued through Crash My Moon Yacht in 2000 (on which they introduced East European instrumentation), and Mr. Boy Dog in 2002.

Their 2003 album Chaiming the Knoblessone incorporated influences from around the world and has been described as "a slithering, buzzing cacophony of avant-garde folk insanity", and as "a surreal head trip". The band's latest album is 2005's The Land We All Believe In, described by one reviewer as "a magnanimous, comic investigation into realities both political and otherwise", and as sounding "like a wagonload of circus performers being trampled by an endless stream of rhinos, with horns, accordions and banjos squeaking at random and Eastern European blood running thick on the ground" by another.

The band split up in the mid-2000s with Sutherland and other members resurfacing as acoustic group Fire on Fire, Sutherland also performing solo.

== Members ==
- Caleb Mulkerin – guitar, keyboards, bowed fiddle, musical saw, zither, vocals (1994–2005)
- Chriss Sutherland – bass, guitar, banjo, percussion, vocals (1994–2005)
- Tom Rogers – drums, percussion (1994–2005)
- Josh Ogden – guitar (1994–1995)
- Justin Hoy - Keyboards (1994–1995)
- Kristen Hedges – guitar, vocals (1996)
- David Mulder – keyboards, percussion (1996–1997)
- Thomas Kovacevic – guitar, lute, oud, panpipe, flute, piano, vocals (1997–2001)
- Tim Harbeson – keyboards, trumpet, flute, accordion, bass clarinet (1998–2001)
- Eric LaPerna – percussion (1998–2001)
- Erin Davidson – bass, guitar, trumpet, percussion, vocals (2001–2005)
- Karl Greenwald – lyrics, vocals, percussion, sampler (2001–2005)
- Colleen Kinsella – accordion, keyboards, percussion, vocals (2001–2005)
- Tim Morin – drums, percussion (2004–2005)

== Discography ==
=== Albums ===
- Cerberus Shoal (1995), Stella White
- ...and Farewell to Hightide (1997), Tree
- Elements of Structure/Permanence (1998), A.I.P.
- Homb (1999), Temporary Residence
- Crash My Moon Yacht (2000), Pandemonium
- Mr. Boy Dog (2002), Temporary Residence
- Chaiming the Knoblessone (2003), North East Indie
- Bastion of Itchy Preeves (2004), North East Indie
- The Land We All Believe In (2005), North East Indie
- An Ongoing DING (2010), iscollagecollective

=== Singles, EPs ===
- Lighthouse in Athens Part One EP (1996), Tree
- Lighthouse in Athens Part Two EP (1996), Tree
- "Breathing Machine" (1997)
- "Garden Fly, Drip Eye" (2001), North East Indie
- Travels in Constants vol. 10 EP (2001), Temporary Residence

=== Split releases ===
- The Whys and the Hows of Herman Düne & Cerberus Shoal (2002), North East Indie - split with Herman Düne
- The Ducks and Drakes of... (2003), North Eastern Digital - split with Guapo
- The Vim and Vigour of Alvarius B and Cerberus Shoal (2003), North East Indie - split with Alvarius B
- The Life and Times Of... (2004), North Eastern Digital - split with Magic Carpathians
