= Napoleon and Josephine =

Napoleon and Josephine may refer to:

- The romantic relationship between Napoleon Bonaparte and Joséphine de Beauharnais from 1795 to 1814
- Napoleon and Josephine, a 1965 historical novel by Frances Mossiker
- Napoleon and Josephine: A Love Story, a 1987 television miniseries
- Napoleon & Josephine (Sun City Girls Singles Volume 2), a 2009 compilation album by Sun City Girls

== See also ==
- Josephine (disambiguation)
- Napoleon (disambiguation)
