= Wenu Wenu =

Studio album by Omar Souleyman
- Released: 21 October 2013
- Studio: Studio G, Brooklyn, New York City
- Genre: Dabke; electronic
- Length: 39:47
- Language: Arabic; Kurdish
- Label: Ribbon Music
- Producer: Kieran Hebden

Omar Souleyman studio chronology
Wenu Wenu (2013)	Bahdeni Nami (2015)

Wenu Wenu is the debut studio album by Syrian singer Omar Souleyman, released on 21 October 2013 on the American independent record label Ribbon Music. Although at the time of the album's release he already had a 20-year career and an extensive catalog of self-published live recordings, it is technically his first studio offering. Souleyman specializes in the dabke genre, which is typical at Levantine wedding parties, and his unique take on the genre—known for its electronic, minimalist sound—began to catch the attention of Western avant-garde and club music audiences after being included in bootleg compilations on the Sublime Frequencies label beginning in 2006. Following this, the singer started touring internationally, and his studio debut was preceded by collaborations with established Western acts such as Björk, Caribou and Damon Albarn.

The album was recorded in Brooklyn and produced by English electronic musician Kieran Hebden, better known as Four Tet, who maintained the sound that had made Souleyman famous in his live recordings while improving its sharpness and presence. Wenu Wenu was well received by music critics, especially in the British press.

== Critical reception ==
Professional ratings
Aggregate scores
Source	Rating
AnyDecentMusic?	7.6/10
Metacritic	79/100
Review scores
Source	Rating
AllMusic	4/5 stars
DIY	4/4 stars
Drowned in Sound	8/10
MusicOMH	4.5/5 stars
NME	4/5 stars
Pitchfork	7.2/10
Rolling Stone	3.5/4 stars
Spin	8/10
The Observer	3/5 stars

At Metacritic, which assigns a normalized rating out of 100 to reviews from mainstream publications, the album received a weighted average score of 79, based on 11 reviews, indicating "generally favorable reviews". Writing for Spin, Robert Christgau began by noting: "Silly things will be written about this record, so let me emphasize up top that, overhyped or not, a fine record it is, and fine in a distinct way." He also predicted that Souleyman "is certain to become more famous than he already is, which is more than he ever imagined, although he must have hoped the simplification of folkloric dabke that made him a star in Syria would have international reach." El Hunt of DIY gave Wenu Wenu the highest rating of four stars and described it as "one of the craziest, most frentic, restless albums to surface this year, and it's also the one that stands out as most unique." In his review for Rolling Stone, Will Hermes praised the album's "hot, fresh and, given our domestic Arab-phobia, radical sound."

Much of the publications—among them Spin, Rolling Stone, The Observer, The New York Times, and NME—noted Hebden's production, pointing out that it did not introduce major changes to Souleyman's typical style other than improving its sound quality. Regarding this, Miles Raymer of Pitchfork wrote: "While some of those choices in synth patches were undoubtedly Hebden's, they're never obvious. There are touches here and there—the subtle modulated delay on a synthesizer lead, the odd filter sweep—where his participation comes through, but it never sounds like he's trying to make Wenu Wenu a Four Tet album, or make Souleyman fit the parameters of Western dance music or, god forbid, sound fashionable."

Various critics mentioned the armed conflict in Souleyman's native Syria, which had escalated into a civil war the previous year. For example, Christgau noted: "As a horrendous conflict wrecks Syria, Souleyman pursues no political agenda whatsoever while reminding us vividly how worked up human beings can get about a life-and-death matter that only occasionally induces them to kill each other — namely, romantic love." Writing for Mixmag, Joe Muggs felt that the "horrors of Souleyman's home country throw extra layers of sadness and hope into the mix. But whatever you read into it, this is powerful, living dance music, above all else." Similarly, musicOMH's Jude Clarke felt that Souleyman "has an implicit mission to present Syria and its culture in a positive way" and concluded: "At a time when so little that is warm, life-enhancing or joyous seems to be emanating from Syria, this–surely–can only make the wonderful music that he provides even more of a wonderful thing."

The title track "Wenu Wenu" appeared in the end of year lists of the top songs of 2013 by Pitchfork at number 79, Humo at number 8, and Pretty Much Amazing at number 82; while "Warni Warni" was listed unnumbered by NPR, and at number 52 by Rockdelux.

== Track listing ==
Wenu Wenu track listing
No.	Title	Length
1.	"Wenu Wenu"	7:01
2.	"Ya Yumma"	4:29
3.	"Nahy"	5:32
4.	"Khattaba"	5:12
5.	"Warni Warni"	6:53
6.	"Mawal Jamar"	4:19
7.	"Yagbuni"	6:21
Total length:		39:47

== Personnel ==
Credits adapted from Wenu Wenu's liner notes.

- Kieran Hebden – producer
- Omar Souleyman – performer
- Rizan Sa'id – performer
- Tony Maimone – engineer
- Spencer Sweeney – artwork
- Rob Carmichael – design
