= Torch of the Mystics =

Studio album by Sun City Girls
- Released: 1990
- Recorded: July 1988
- Genres: Experimental rock; psychedelic rock; psychedelic folk
- Length: 37:48
- Labels: Majora; Tupelo (re-issue)
- Producer: Sun City Girls

Sun City Girls chronology
Horse Cock Phepner (1987)	Torch of the Mystics (1990)	Dawn of the Devi (1991)

Torch of the Mystics is the fourth studio album by American experimental rock band Sun City Girls. The 1990 LP cover released on Majora differs from the 1993 CD reissue by Tupelo.

== Recording history ==
Most of the album was recorded on an 8-track at a home in Tempe, Arizona, in 1988. The band took much of their inspiration from Alan Bishop's field recordings.

== Release and reception ==
Professional ratings
Review scores
Source	Rating
AllMusic	4.5/5 stars
Pitchfork	9.0/10

Torch of the Mystics was originally issued by Majora Records solely on vinyl format in 1990. However, due to its compressed and tinny sounding production, the album was remastered and re-released by Tupelo Records in 1993.

Noting its "swirling, psychedelic ethnic forgeries that will make Can fans renounce post-Landed Kraut Rock wax", Byron Coley wrote in Spin that the album "is easily the richest, lumpiest puddle of guh they've yet emitted."

Since its release, the album has received critical acclaim from websites such as AllMusic and Pitchfork.

== Track listing ==
Side one
No.	Title	Length
1.	"Blue Mamba"	3:06
2.	"Tarmac 23"	4:23
3.	"Esoterica of Abyssynia"	3:13
4.	"Space Prophet Dogon"	7:02

Side two
No.	Title	Length
1.	"The Shining Path"	2:56
2.	"The Flower"	3:13
3.	"Cafe Batik"	2:41
4.	"Radar 1941"	2:44
5.	"Papa Legba"	2:42
6.	"The Vinegar Stroke"	1:53
7.	"Burial in the Sky"	3:48

== Sources ==
The song "The Shining Path" is cover of the Bolivian song "Llorando se fue," recorded by Los Kjarkas in 1981.

== In popular culture ==
- The song "Lariat" by Stephen Malkmus and the Jicks mentions the album.

== Personnel ==
Adapted from the Torch of the Mystics liner notes.

Sun City Girls

- Alan Bishop – bass guitar, vocals, acoustic guitar, bell, rhaita, percussion, maracas. engineering
- Richard Bishop – guitar, kontiki, melodica, oboe, rainstick, harpsichord, slide guitar, chant
- Charles Gocher – drums, horn, angklung, handclaps, gong, shaker, timbales, maracas, triangle, steel drums

== Release history ==
Region	Date	Label	Format	Catalog
United States	1990	Majora	LP	5-23102
United States	1993	Tupelo Recording Company	CD	TUP44
United States	2015	Abduction	CD	ABDT 055
