= To Syria, with Love =

Studio album by Omar Souleyman
- Released: 2 June 2017
- Length: 44:13
- Label: Mad Decent

Omar Souleyman chronology
Bahdeni Nami (2015)	To Syria, with Love (2017)	Shlon (2019)

Professional ratings
Aggregate scores
Source	Rating
Metacritic	70/100
Review scores
Source	Rating
AllMusic	3.5/5 stars
DIY	3/5 stars
Drowned in Sound	7/10
Paste	7.9/10
Pitchfork	6.5/10

To Syria, with Love is the third studio album by Syrian musician Omar Souleyman. It was released on 2nd June 2017 under Mad Decent.

== Background ==
In a press release, Souleyman described the album as a "personal ode to Syria" and focuses on his emotional connection with the country. Longtime collaborator, Shawah Al Ahmad, wrote most of the lyrics for the album.

== Critical reception ==
To Syria, with Love was met with generally favorable reviews from critics. At Metacritic, which assigns a weighted average rating out of 100 to reviews from mainstream publications, this release received an average score of 70, based on 13 reviews

=== Accolades ===
Publication	Accolade	Rank	Ref.
Crack Magazine	Top 100 Albums of 2017	35	

== Track listing ==
To Syria, with Love track listing
No.	Title	Length
1.	"Ya Boul Habari"	5:13
2.	"Ya Bnayya"	6:49
3.	"Es Samra"	7:14
4.	"Aenta Lhabbeytak"	6:27
5.	"Khayen"	6:14
6.	"Mawal"	4:38
7.	"Chobi"	7:38

== Charts ==
Chart performance for To Syria, with Love
Chart	Peak position
Belgian Albums (Ultratop Flanders)	152
