= Monk Turner =

American musician, songwriter, and record producer

Monk Turner is an American musician, songwriter, and record producer. Known as the “galactic defender of the concept album”, Turner has created a number of multi-genre concept albums. He is known for winning the Free Music Archive's competition to create a copyright-free replacement for the song "Happy Birthday to You" whose rights were once owned by Time Warner.

== Musical career ==
He often collaborates with other musicians: Kaleidoscope (2012) incorporated more than 40 artists internationally, and his narrative album Emergency Songs (2011) is a co-creation with singer and lyricist Alanna Lin (a.k.a. Fascinoma). It imagines post-earthquake scenarios in Los Angeles, self-styled as “public safety through music and storytelling”. The track “Judicious Jason” from Instrumental Friends (Part 3) was the chosen soundtrack at the 2015 Blue Ribbon Children’s Festival, when 2,231 students made a Guinness World Record with history’s largest choreographed ribbon dance.

Over the years Turner has released all of his albums via Creative Commons licenses “as a means to escape the constraints of traditional music composition / distribution”. He is a former Featured Commoner and has spoken alongside artists such as Curt Smith about the benefits of CC licenses for musicians and other content makers.

In 2020, Turner released the concept album Divided States, a collection of songs addressing political and social division. He followed this with the four-part EP series Emotional Baggage (2021), a project exploring sixteen human emotions across multiple releases.

Turner has continued to release concept-driven albums spanning a variety of themes, including mythology, color, and personal relationships, maintaining a prolific output of multi-genre conceptual works. In 2025 he released the collaborative holiday-themed album Holiday Party!.

== The Birthday Song ==
In 2013, WFMU and the Free Music Archive held a competition to create a copyright-free version of the ubiquitous “Happy Birthday to You”. Monk Turner's composition with musician Fascinoma entitled “It’s Your Birthday!” won the contest.

== Discography ==
=== Albums ===
- Holiday Party! (2025)
- Emotional Baggage, Part 4 (2021)
- Emotional Baggage, Part 3 (2021)
- Emotional Baggage, Part 2 (2021)
- Emotional Baggage, Part 1 (2021)
- Divided States (2020)
- God Complex (2016)
- Instrumental Friends Part 3 (2013)
- Kaleidoscope (2012)
- Emergency Songs (2011)
- Live on KXLU (2011)
- Coordinates (2010)
- Love Story (2009)
