= Dante's Disneyland Inferno =

Studio album by Sun City Girls
- Released: May 6, 1996
- Genre: Experimental rock, spoken word
- Length: 138:59
- Label: Abduction
- Producer: Sun City Girls

Sun City Girls chronology
Jacks Creek (1995)	Dante's Disneyland Inferno (1996)	330,003 Crossdressers From Beyond the Rig Veda (1996)

Professional ratings
Review scores
Source	Rating
Allmusic	4/5 stars

Dante's Disneyland Inferno is the ninth studio album by American experimental rock band Sun City Girls, released in 1996 by Abduction Records.

The album cover features depictions of the demons Ukobach, Xaphan and Eurynomos from Jacques Collin de Plancy's Dictionnaire Infernal.

== Track listing ==
=== Disc one ===
All tracks are written by Sun City Girls.

No.	Title	Length
1.	"Sexy Graveyard"	11:50
2.	"Hector and Chino"	4:32
3.	"Soft Fragile Eggshell Minds"	2:43
4.	"A Bad Dream"	1:23
5.	"The Geography of the Swastika"	11:11
6.	"Flesh Balloons of Tibet"	1:20
7.	"Pay the Fiddler"	1:53
8.	"The Brothers Unconnected"	3:06
9.	"Hippie Conglomerate"	0:52
10.	"Five Minutes"	1:08
11.	"Charles Gocher Sr."	7:16
12.	"A Man is an Insect is a Flame"	2:05
13.	"Jack the Ripper"	4:43
14.	"Persistence of Vision"	1:18
15.	"Dear Anybody"	3:05
16.	"A Secret Revealed Unwittingly"	2:35
17.	"Helen Waite"	4:11
18.	"Jessup's Diary"	8:34

=== Disc two ===
No.	Title	Length
1.	"The Ballad of (D)Anger"	1:42
2.	"Bitter Cold Countryside"	4:29
3.	"Ruby on the Ferris Wheel"	6:29
4.	"The Ballad of Co-Dependency"	1:39
5.	"Joan of Arc"	3:20
6.	"Holiday for Shakespeare"	2:47
7.	"The Harley of Horror"	8:42
8.	"Let's Pretend"	2:02
9.	"Floppy Pus"	1:09
10.	"Bloody Zipper"	1:30
11.	"Family of Nails"	2:22
12.	"Fourteen"	7:29
13.	"Sal Manilla"	2:57
14.	"Six Kids of Mine"	3:34
15.	"Dan and Ross"	1:46
16.	"Book of Revelations"	6:56
17.	"Bird of Prey"	6:21

== Personnel ==
Sun City Girls

- Alan Bishop – Bass, Wooden Guitar, Vocals, Melodica, Percussion, Harmonica, Autoharp, Flutes, Bells, Burmese Banjo
- Richard Bishop – Guitar, Piano, Organ, Keyboards, Harmonica, Kalimba, Typewriter, Autoharp, Tibetan Horns, Bells, Mandolin, Vocals
- Charles Gocher – Vocals, Drums, Gongs, Bells, Marimba, Piano, Mandolin, Orchestra Bells

Additional personnel

- Scott Colburn – Bongos (disc 1.track 1), Vocals (1.3, 1.12 / 2.1, 2.2, 2.14), Piano (2.12, 2.17), Organ (2.14), Mixing
- Crystal Gallegos – Vocals (1.2)
- Damon Bostrom – DX7 (1.15)
- Heidi Peterson – Vocals (1.16)
- Eddy Detroit – Percussion (2.3), the goat (2.13)

== Release history ==
Region	Date	Label	Format	Catalog
United States	1996	Abduction	CD	ABDT007
United States	2002	Locust Music	LP	LOCUST 13
Italy	2010	Get Back	LP	GET 719
