= The Freak of Araby =

Studio album by Sir Richard Bishop
- Released: May 26, 2009
- Genre: Experimental Music
- Label: Drag City

Professional ratings
Review scores
Source	Rating
Allmusic	4/5 stars

The Freak of Araby is an album by Sir Richard Bishop, released on May 26, 2009, on the Drag City record label. It includes cover versions of several songs written by the Egyptian guitarist/composer Omar Khorshid.

== Track listing ==
1. Taqasim for Omar - 7:16
2. Enta Omri - 2:45
3. Barbary - 2:20
4. Solenzara - 5:01
5. The Pillars of Baalbek - 5:18
6. Kaddak El Mayass - 3:26
7. Essaouira - 2:21
8. Ka'an Azzaman - 2:51
9. Sidi Mansour - 6:03
10. Blood-Stained Sands - 7:26
