= Sublime Frequencies =

American record label based in Seattle

- Founded: 2003
- Founder: Alan Bishop, Richard Bishop, Hisham Mayet
- Country of origin: United States
- Location: Seattle, Washington
- Official website: www.sublimefrequencies.com

Sublime Frequencies is a record label based in Seattle, Washington that focuses exclusively on "acquiring and exposing obscure sights and sounds from modern and traditional urban and rural frontiers," mostly from Southeast Asia, North Africa and West Africa and the Middle East.

The releases are usually divided into four categories: field recordings, folk and pop compilations, radio collages from specific geographic locales, and DVDs. The label was founded in 2003 by Richard Bishop and Alan Bishop of the experimental rock band Sun City Girls, and Hisham Mayet. It is headed by Alan Bishop and Hisham Mayet. Its releases are produced in limited quantities, usually up to a thousand copies.

Its mission statement is: Sublime Frequencies is a collective of explorers dedicated to acquiring and exposing obscure sights and sounds from modern and traditional urban and rural frontiers via film and video, field recordings, radio and short wave transmissions, international folk and pop music, sound anomalies, and other forms of human and natural expression not documented sufficiently through all channels of academic research, the modern recording industry, media, or corporate foundations. Sublime Frequencies is focused on an aesthetic of extra-geography and soulful experience inspired by music and culture, world travel, research.

In 2014 Sublime Frequencies created a Bandcamp page where listeners can listen to and purchase digital copies of some albums or individual tracks, including some previously sold-out albums. In 2016 E. Tammy Kim and Michael E. Veal published Punk Ethnography: Artists & Scholars Listen to Sublime Frequencies, which is a collection of interviews and essays about the label.

== Releases ==
List up-to-date as of December 11, 2025.

=== CDs ===
- SF 001 – Folk and Pop Sounds of Sumatra Vol.1
- SF 002 – Radio Java
- SF 003 – Night Recordings From Bali
- SF 006 – Princess Nicotine: Folk and Pop Music of Myanmar (Burma)
- SF 007 – Radio Morocco
- SF 008 – Radio Palestine: Sounds of the Eastern Mediterranean
- SF 009 – I Remember Syria 2-CD
- SF 011 – Cambodian Cassette Archives: Khmer Folk & Pop music Vol. 1
- SF 012 – Bush Taxi Mali: Field Recordings From Mali
- SF 013 – Brokenhearted Dragonflies: Insect Electronica from Southeast Asia
- SF 014 – Radio India: The Eternal Dream of Sound 2-CD
- ANOM26 – Leaf Music, Drunks, Distant Drums
- SF 016 – Streets of Lhasa
- SF 017 – Harmika Yab Yum: Folk Sounds From Nepal
- SF 018 – Folk and Pop Sounds of Sumatra Vol. 2
- SF 019 – Molam: Thai Country Groove From Isan
- SF 020 – Radio Phnom Penh
- SF 021 – Radio Sumatra: The Indonesian FM Experience
- SF 023 – Radio Pyongyang: Commie Funk and Agit Pop from the Hermit Kingdom
- SF 024 – Guitars of the Golden Triangle: Folk and Pop Music of Myanmar Vol. 2
- SF 025 – Choubi Choubi! Folk and Pop Sounds from Iraq
- SF 027 – Ethnic Minority Music of Northeast Cambodia
- SF 028 – Radio Thailand: Transmissions from the Tropical Kingdom 2-CD
- SF 029 – Radio Algeria
- SF 030 – Group Doueh: Guitar Music From The Western Sahara
- SF 031 – Omar Souleyman: Highway to Hassake (Folk and Pop Sounds of Syria)
- SF 032 – Thai Pop Spectacular (1960s-1980s)
- SF 033 – Molam: Thai Country Groove From Isan Vol. 2
- SF 034 – Group Inerane: Guitars From Agadez (Music of Niger)
- SF 035 – Music of Nat Pwe: Folk and Pop Music of Myanmar Vol. 3
- SF 036 – Ethnic Minority Music of Southern Laos
- SF 037 – Ethnic Minority Music of North Vietnam
- SF 038 – Proibidão C.V: Forbidden Gang Funk From Rio de Janeiro
- SF 039 – Latinamericarpet: Exploring the Vinyl Warp of Latin American Psychedelia Vol. 1
- SF 043 – Bollywood Steel Guitar
- SF 044 – Radio Myanmar (Burma)
- SF 045 – 1970's Algerian Proto-Rai Underground
- SF 049 – Omar Souleyman: Dabke 2020 (Folk and Pop Sounds of Syria)
- SF 050 – Siamese Soul: Thai Pop Spectacular Vol. 2
- SF 051 – Singapore A-Go-Go
- SF 052 – Omar Khorshid: Guitar El Chark (Guitar of the Orient)
- SF 053 – Koes Bersaudara 1967
- SF 054 – Dara Puspita 1966-1968
- SF 055 – Omar Souleyman: Jazeera Nights
- SF 057 – Ethnic Minority Music of Northwest Xinjiang (China)
- SF 058 – Koes Plus Volumes 1 & 2 (1969-1970)
- SF 059 – My Friend Rain
- SF 060 – Saigon Rock & Soul: Vietnamese Classic Tracks 1968-1974
- SF 061 – Group Inerane: Guitars From Agadez Vol 3
- SF 062 – Hayvanlar Alemi: Guarana Superpower
- SF 065 – Staring Into The Sun DVD/CD/Book
- SF 066 – Group Doueh: Zayna Jumma
- SF 067 – Erkin Koray: Mechul (Singles and Rarities)
- SF 068 – Omar Souleyman: Haflat Gharbia (The Western Concerts)
- SF 079 – CD Pop Yeh Yeh: Psychedelic Rock from Singapore and Malaysia 1964-1970
- SF 081 – Ethnic Minority Music of Southern China
- SF 086 – Radio Niger
- SF 088 – 1970s Algerian Folk & Pop
- SF 095 – Radio Vietnam
- SF 099 – Indian Talking Machine: 78rpm and Gramophone Collecting on the Sub-Continent Book + 2CD
- SF 101 – Music Of Xinjiang
- SF 102 – Outlier: Recordings From Madagascar
- SF 104 – Burkina Faso: Volume 2
- SF 110 – The Photographs Of Charles Duvelle: Disques OCORA And Collection PROPHET (2CD + Book)
- SF 112 – Deben Bhattacharya – Paris To Calcutta (Men And Music On The Desert Road) (4CD + Book)
- SF 113 – Baba Commandant & The Mandingo Band – Sira Ba Kele
- SF 114 – Senyawa – Sujud
- SF 115 – Sound Storing Machines: The First 78rpm Records From Japan, 1903-1912
- SF 119 – Baligh Hamdi* = بليغ حمدي – Instrumental Modal Pop Of 1970s Egypt
- SF 120 – Phương Tâm – Magical Nights: Saigon Surf, Twist & Soul (1964-1966)
- SF 121 – Baba Commandant & The Mandingo Band – Sonbonbela

=== DVDs ===
- SF 004 – Nat Pwe: Burma's Carnival of Spirit Soul
- SF 005 – Jemaa El Fna: Morocco's Rendezvous of the Dead
- SF 010 – Folk Music of the Sahara: Among the Tuareg of Libya
- SF 015 – Isan: Folk and Pop Music of Northeast Thailand
- SF 022 – Niger: Magic and Ecstasy in the Sahel
- SF 026 – Phi Ta Khon: Ghosts of Isan
- SF 040 – Sumatran Folk Cinema
- SF 041 – Musical Brotherhoods From The Trans-Saharan Highway
- SF 047 – Palace of the Winds
- SF 059 – My Friend Rain
- SF 065 – Staring Into The Sun DVD/CD/Book
- SF 073 – This World Is Unreal Like A Snake In A Rope
- SF 075 – The Divine River: Ceremonial Pageantry In The Sahel
- SF 080 – The Pierced Heart and the Machete
- SF 082 – Small Path Music (With Laurent Jeanneau)
- SF 089 – Vodoun Gods On The Slave Coast
- SF 094 – The Stirring of a Thousand Bells

=== LPs ===
- SF 001 – Folk and Pop Sounds of Sumatra Vol 1 LP
- SF 006 – Princess Nicotine: Folk and Pop Sounds of Myanmar (Burma) Vol 1 LP
- SF 011 – Cambodian Cassette Archives: Khmer Folk & Pop music Vol. 1 2-LP
- SF 019 – Molam: Thai Country Groove From Isan
- SF 025 – Choubi Choubi! Folk and Pop Sounds from Iraq 2LP
- SF 030 – Group Doueh: Guitar Music From The Western Sahara
- SF 031 – Omar Souleyman: Highway to Hassake (Folk and Pop Sounds of Syria) 2-LP
- SF 034 – Group Inerane: Guitars From Agadez (Music of Niger)
- SF 042 – Shadow Music Of Thailand
- SF 043 – Bollywood Steel Guitar
- SF 045 – 1970's Algerian Proto-Rai Underground
- SF 046 – Group Bombino – Guitars From Agadez, Vol. 2
- SF 048 – Group Doueh: Treeg Salaam
- SF 052 – Omar Khorshid: Guitar El Chark (Guitar of the Orient)
- SF 056 – Ecstatic Music of the Jemaa El Fna
- SF 060 – Saigon Rock & Soul: Vietnamese Classic Tracks 1968-1974
- SF 061 – Group Inerane: Guitars From Agadez Vol 3
- SF 062 – Hayvanlar Alemi: Guarana Superpower
- SF 063 – Group Doueh: Beatte Harab
- SF 064 – Pakistan: Folk & Pop Instrumentals 1966 – 1976
- SF 066 – Group Doueh – Zayna Jumma
- SF 067 – Erkin Koray: Mechul (Singles and Rarities)
- SF 068 – Omar Souleyman: Haflat Gharbia (The Western Concerts)
- SF 071 – Eat the Dream: Gnawa Music from Essaouira
- SF 074 – Staring into the Sun: Ethiopian Tribal Music
- SF 077 – Scattered Melodies: Korean Kayagum Sanjo
- SF 078 – The Crying Princess: 78 rpm Records From Burma
- SF 083 – Hassānīya Music from the Western Sahara and Mauritania
- SF 084 – Koudede: Guitars from Agadez Vol. 7
- SF 085 – Choubi Choubi! Folk and Pop Sounds From Iraq Vol. 2
- SF 087 – Rajasthan Street Music
- SF 088 – 1970s Algerian Folk & Pop
- SF 090 – Folk Music Of The Sahel Vol.1: Niger 2-LP
- SF 091 – Omar Khorshid and his Group: Live In Australia 1981
- SF 092 – The Traveling Archive- Folk Music From Bengal
- SF 093 – A Distant Invitation: Ceremonial Street Recordings from Burma, Cambodia, India, Indonesia, Malaysia, and Thailand
- SF 096 – Music Of Tanzania 2-LP
- SF 097 – Baba Commandant and the Mandingo Band – Juguya
- SF 098 – Adnan Othman – Bersyukor: A Retrospective of Hits by a Malaysian Pop Yeh Yeh Legend
- SF 101 – Music of Xinjiang: Uyghur and Kazakh Music from Northwest Xinjiang (China)
- SF 102 – Outlier: Recordings from Madagascar
- SF 103 – Burkina Faso: Volume 1
- SF 104 – Burkina Faso: Volume 2
- SF 105 – Burkina Faso: Volume 3
- SF 106 – Kwangkay (Funerary Music Of The Dayak Benuaq Of Borneo)
- SF 107 – Music Of The Bahnar People From The Central Highlands Of Vietnam
- SF 108 – Ishq Ke Maare: Sufi Songs From Sindh And Punjab, Pakistan
- SF 109 – Where The Mountains Meet The Sky: Folk Music Of Ladakh
- SF 111 – To Catch a Ghost: Field Recordings from Madagascar
- SF 113 – Baba Commandant & The Mandingo Band – Sira Ba Kele
- SF 114 – Senyawa – Sujud
- SF 115 – Sound Storing Machines: The First 78rpm Records From Japan, 1903-1912
- SF 116 – Natik Awayez – Manbarani
- SF 117 – Mien (Yao) – Canon Singing in China, Vietnam, Laos
- SF 118 – Gyil Music Of Ghana's Upper West Region
- SF 119 – Baligh Hamdi* = بليغ حمدي – Instrumental Modal Pop Of 1970s Egypt
- SF 120 – Phương Tâm – Magical Nights – Saigon Surf, Twist & Soul (1964-1966)
- SF 121 – Baba Commandant & The Mandingo Band – Sonbonbela
- SF 122 – Madhuvanti Pal – The Holy Mother: Madhuvanti Pal Plays The Rudra Veena
- SF 123 – Hani Polyphonic Singing in Yunnan China
- SF 124 – The Handover
- SF 125 – Music for Shape-Shifters: Field Recordings from the Amazonian Lowlands, 1981-1985
- SF 126 – Tsapiky! Modern Music From Southwest Madagascar
- SF 127 – Born In The City Of Tanta – Lower Egyptian Urban Folklore And Bedouin Shaabi From Libya's Bourini Records 1968-75
- SF 128 – Group Inerane – Marhajan Bianou
- SF 129 – Music From The Mountain People of Central Vietnam
- SF 130 – Pastor Chris Congregation – West Virginia Snake Handler Revival “They Shall Take Up Serpents”

=== EPs ===
- SF 069 – Group Inerane: Guitars From Agadez Volume. 4
- SF 070 – Hayvanlar Alemi – Yekermo Sew
- SF 072 – Koudede – Guitars from Agadez Vol. 5
- SF 076 – Koudede: Guitars from Agadez Vol. 6
- SF 084 – Koudede: Guitars from Agadez Vol. 7

=== Books ===
- SF 099 – Indian Talking Machine: 78rpm and Gramophone Collecting on the Sub-Continent Book + 2CD
- SF 110 – The Photographs Of Charles Duvelle: Disques Ocora And Collection Prophet Book + 2CD
- SF 112 – Paris to Calcutta (Men and Music on The Desert Road) by Deben Bhattacharya Book + 4CD

== See also ==
- List of record labels
