= Tribe of Noise =

Tribe of Noise BV
- Company type: Privately held company
- Website type: Social networking service, music websites, music licensing
- Founded: 2008 (Amsterdam, The Netherlands)
- Headquarters: Amsterdam, The Netherlands
- Founder: Hessel van Oorschot; Sandra Brandenburg
- Products: music: Film music, video game music, production music, soundtrack, theme music, music databases, internet radio, digital curation
- Website: www.tribeofnoise.com, pro.tribeofnoise.com, www.bizmusiq.com, sonos.tribeofnoise.com
- Launched: July 14, 2008

Tribe of Noise BV is a "music-for-business" service company. The company has a catalogue of "over 34,000 independent artists" across 194 countries.

Music uploaded in the Tribe of Noise Community are licensed through Creative Commons 4.0 By Share Alike while Tribe of Noise Pro use its own licensing.

== History ==
Tribe of Noise was founded by Sandra Brandenburg and Hessel van Oorschot in 2008 with an objective "to create fair and sustainable business opportunities for talented artists". It was one of 23 finalists in The Next Web PayPal X Startup Rally 2010.

Tribe of Noise has partnerships with companies including Getty Images. On September 12, 2019, Tribe of Noise acquired Free Music Archive for an undisclosed amount.
