= Omar Souleyman =

Syrian singer (born 1966)

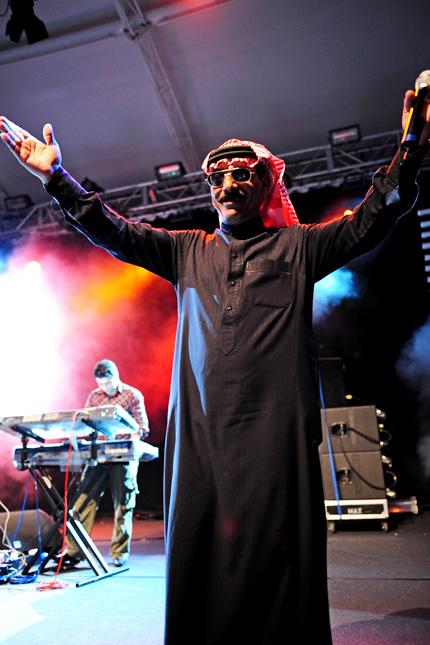
- Omar Souleyman performing at Perth International Arts Festival in 2011

Background information
- Also known as: Omar Souleyman
- Born: Omar Almasikh; 1966 (age 59–60); Ras al-Ayn, al-Hasakah, Syria
- Origin: Tell Tamer, al-Hasakah, Syria
- Genres: Dabke; electronic music
- Occupations: Singer; farmer
- Instrument: Vocals
- Years active: 1994–present
- Labels: Sublime Frequencies; Ribbon Music; Monkeytown; Mad Decent
- Website: omarsouleyman.bandcamp.com

Omar Almasikh (Arabic: عمر المسيخ; born 1966), better known by his stage name Omar Souleyman (عمر سليمان), is a Syrian singer. He began his career in 1994 singing at weddings and has since released numerous records and performed all over the world. He produces a modernized version of the traditional dabke.

== Early life ==
Omar Souleyman was born in the village of Ras al-Ayn near the Syria–Turkey border but grew up in the city of Tell Tamer. He started his career as a part-time wedding singer in his native al-Hasakah Governorate, and while he is a Sunni Arab, he emphasises the influence its diverse milieu has had on his style:

"My music is from the community I come from – the Arabs, the Kurds, the Assyrians, they're all in this community. Even Turkish because it's so near, it's just across the border. And even Iraqi."

== Career ==
Omar Souleyman began his career in 1994, working with a number of musicians with whom he still performs. Although over 500 albums have been released under his name, the vast majority of these albums are recordings made at weddings and given as gifts to the married couple, which are then copied and sold at local kiosks.

His music is characterized by his blend of Middle Eastern melodies with ululating keyboards, electronic beats and throaty vocals.

In October 2013 a newly recorded album Wenu Wenu was released by UK label Ribbon Music.

== Collaborations and notable appearances ==
He appeared at the Glastonbury Festival in 2011, and performed during Chaos in Tejas in Austin, Texas, in June 2011. In August 2011, Omar Souleyman appeared at Paredes de Coura in Portugal. Souleyman was chosen by Caribou to perform at the ATP Nightmare Before Christmas festival that they co-curated in December 2011 in Minehead, England.

In 2011 he recorded three remixes for Björk's Biophilia, all found on the second disc of her "Crystalline Series".

In 2013 he worked with British producer Four Tet on his album Wenu Wenu. He collaborated with Four Tet again on his 2015 release Bahdeni Nami.

In August 2013, before his performance at the Way Out West festival in Gothenburg, Sweden, Swedish authorities initially denied his artist visa out of concern that he would request asylum. His visa was granted two days before the festival. In December 2013, he performed at the Nobel Peace Prize Concert in Oslo, Norway.

In June 2014 he performed at The Bonnaroo Music and Arts Festival in Manchester, Tennessee. In July he performed at Roskilde Festival, Denmark and at the Mostly Jazz, Funk and Soul Festival, in Birmingham, UK. He then performed at One Love Festival in Istanbul on 16 June 2014. In August 2014 he performed at Pukkelpop Festival in Kiewit, Hasselt, in Belgium. Later that summer on 31 August he played the Electric Picnic festival in Ireland. He also played at Treefort Music Festival in Boise, Idaho, in March 2015. In October 2017 he performed at Bristol's SimpleThings festival.

In September 2025, it was announced Souleyman would appear on the Gorillaz album The Mountain, on the song "Damascus" alongside American rapper, Yasiin Bey. The band premiered the song at their Mystery Show in London alongside Souleyman and Bey, as well as at Brian Eno's Together for Palestine concert at Wembley Arena in London that same month. The song was officially released as the album's fourth single on December 12th.

== Personal life ==
Souleyman lived in Turkey from the start of the Syrian civil war in 2011, which heavily impacted his home region. While in Turkey, Souleyman established a free bakery in the border town of Akçakale, in order to serve poor families from Turkey and Syrian refugees. In November 2021, he was arrested on charges of terrorism, over reports that he had recently travelled back to an area of Syria controlled by the YPG. Souleyman was released two days later. Soon after, he moved to Erbil in Iraqi Kurdistan, dedicating an eponymous 2024 album to the city.

He is self-describedly "not into politics" and "[doesn't] know any solution" for the Syrian civil war.

== Discography ==
External media

Audio
- "You Must Hear This: Bjork Picks Omar Souleyman, All Things Considered on National Public Radio, 2009-06-29

Video
- Omar Souleyman - Haram in Brooklyn - June 2010

Albums

- 2006: Highway to Hassake (compilation) (Sublime Frequencies)
- 2009: Dabke 2020 (compilation) (Sublime Frequencies)
- 2010: Jazeera Nights (compilation) (Sublime Frequencies)
- 2011: Haflat Gharbia - The Western Concerts (2LP (compilation)) (Sublime Frequencies)
- 2011: Leh Jani (2LP, full-length Syrian tape reissue) (Sham Palace)
- 2013: Wenu Wenu (Ribbon Music)
- 2015: Bahdeni Nami (Monkeytown)
- 2017: To Syria, with Love (Mad Decent)
- 2019: Shlon (Mad Decent)
- 2024: Erbil
