= Shlon =

Studio album by Omar Souleyman
- Released: 22 November 2019
- Length: 35:21
- Label: Mad Decent

Omar Souleyman chronology
| To Syria, with Love (2017) | Shlon (2019) |

Professional ratings
Aggregate scores
| Source | Rating |
|---|---|
| Metacritic | 79/100 |
Review scores
| Source | Rating |
| AllMusic | 4/5 stars |
| The Guardian | 4/5 stars |
| The Line of Best Fit | 7/10 |
| MusicOMH | 4/5 stars |
| NME | 4/5 stars |

Shlon is the fourth studio album by Syrian musician Omar Souleyman. It was released on 22 November 2019 under Mad Decent.

The first single from the album, "Layle" was released on October 16, 2019.

== Critical reception ==
Shlon was met with generally favorable reviews from critics. At Metacritic, which assigns a weighted average rating out of 100 to reviews from mainstream publications, this release received an average score of 79, based on 9 reviews

== Track listing ==
Shlon track listing
| No. | Title | Length |
|---|---|---|
| 1. | "Shlon" | 5:57 |
| 2. | "Shi Tridin" | 6:49 |
| 3. | "Mawwal" | 3:51 |
| 4. | "Abou Zilif" | 5:01 |
| 5. | "3tini 7obba" | 7:00 |
| 6. | "Layle" | 6:43 |
