= Deben Bhattacharya =

Bengali producer and author (1921–2001)

- Born: 1921; Benares, India
- Died: 2001 (aged 79–80)
- Occupations: Radio producer, record producer, ethnomusicologist, anthropologist, documentary filmmaker, photographer, translator, poet, writer, broadcaster, lecturer, and folk music consultant

Deben Bhattacharya (1921–2001) was a Bengali radio producer, record producer, ethnomusicologist, anthropologist, documentary filmmaker, photographer, translator, poet, writer, broadcaster, lecturer, and folk music consultant. He produced over 100 records, 23 films and published more than a dozen books in his lifetime and much of his work was carried out under the auspices of UNESCO.

== Early life ==
Bhattacharya was born to an old Bengali Brahmin family that was settled in Benares for over 130 years. As a young man, he was influenced by the work of English poet Lewis Thompson, which prompted him to move to England, where he worked for the BBC as a radio producer. Knowing a lot of Indians in London, he started to record Indian musicians on a Baird tape recorder. When Bhattacharya had the idea to do field recordings in India, he was met with a financial dilemma of needing £80 for the tape recorder, £20 for the transformer, £25 for 20 blank tapes, plus about £60 for a one-way boat ticket to Bombay. Sunday Wilson – a producer for the overseas service, commissioned him for six five-minute programmes, which garnered £30.6.0. Weeks after that, the poet Stephen Spender, who had started his new magazine Encounter, approached Bhattacharya to write an article on Indian poetry and advance him on two further articles. The London-based company Argo Records Ltd. that specialized in classical music also advanced £25 and paid for the Gaumont-British machine, and the tapes against future royalties. He returned with enough material to make four or five records, and one of them was published, called "Songs from Bombay". This led to a trip through the Middle East, recording music in every country, as well as other projects.

== Career ==
Bhattacharya continued to earn international recognition as an expert on ethnic folk music, dance and poetry and was employed to help teach ethnic music and bring ethnic musicians to Sweden. Living for periods of time in London and Stockholm he began making films in 1962 when his BBC Third Programme producer, Robert Leighton, introduced him to David Attenborough, who was then an executive at BBC Television. When Bhattacharya told him that he would be going to India with an experienced cameraman, Attenborough offered him £1,000 to help with his expenses. Upon his return, the BBC edited the material into two films: Kathakali, the classical dance drama of South India, and Storytellers From Rajastan. Following this, Swedish Television gave him money to make a film in Hungary. This led to film making in Romania, Tibet, China, Bangladesh, Nepal and many other countries. Towards the end of his career, Bhattacharya had archived over 16,000 photographs related to his various projects.

== Partial filmography ==
- Waves of Joy: Anandalahari, director and producer
- The Chanting Lama, director
- Silk and Strings: Taiwan, director
- Raga, director
- Painted Ballad of India, director
- Krishna in Spring, director
- Jesus and the Fisherman, director
- Faces of the Forest: The Santals of West Bengal, director and producer
- Echoes From Tibet, director
- Buddha and the Rice-Planters, director
- Ecstatic Circle: Turkey, director (1972)
- Adaptable Kingdom: Music and Dance in Nepal, director (1972)
- The Land of Smiles: Thailand, director and producer (1973)
- Bali: The Isle of Temples, director and producer (1973)
- Chinese Opera, director (1983)
- Uighurs on the Silk Route, director (1985)
- The Cosmic Dance of Shiva, director (1986)

== Partial discography ==
- Music on the Desert Road: A Sound Travelogue by Deben Bhattacharya – Angel Records, recorded 1955, released 1958
- Bedouins of the Middle East, 1955–60 – ARC Music
- The Living Tradition: Songs and Dance from Nepal by Deben Bhattacharya – The Decca Record Company, released 1974
- Sounds of West Sahara: Mauritania – ARC Music, recorded 1978, released 2004
- Maqams of Syria – ARC Music, released 2001
- River Songs of Bangladesh – ARC Music, released 2001
- Treasures in Sound – India – UA International, 1967
- Classical Ragas of India – Philips and Limelight Records, 1968
- Santūr, Tunbūk, And Tār (Music and Drum Rhythm of Iran) – Philips and Limelight Records, 1968
- Inde: Musique populaire du Rajasthan (Music From the Indian Desert) – Disques Ocora, OCR 47, recorded January 1968
- The Living Tradition – Music From Turkey – Argo Records Ltd., 1968
- 2 Ragas – Sveriges Radio, 1969
- The Living Tradition – Music From Iran – Argo, 1971
- The Living Tradition – Songs of Krishna – Argo, 1971
- The Living Tradition – Music From Bangladesh – Argo, 1972
- The Living Tradition – Songs and Dances From Macedonia – Argo, 1972
- Folkmusik Från Rumänien – Caprice Records, 1972
- Musique folklorique du monde: Yougoslavie – Musidisc
- Musique folklorique du monde: Iran – Musidisc
- Musique folklorique du monde: Hongrie – Musidisc
- Sacred Temple Music of Tibet – ARC Music, 1998
- Religious Music - Holy Land / Terre Sainte - Nord Sud Music – NSCD 1180

== Books ==
- Vidyāpati Ṭhākura (1963). W.G. Archer (ed.). Love Songs of Vidyapati. Translated by Deben Bhattacharya. George Allan & Unwin. ISBN 9780048910035.
- Deben Bhattacharya (1970). Songs of the Bards of Bengal. Pgw. ISBN 9780394173856.
- Deben Bhattacharya (2001). Songs of the Qawals of India: Islamic Lyrics of Love and God. HohmPress. ISBN 9780970884503.
- Deben Bhattacharya (2018). Paris to Calcutta: Men and Music on the Desert Road. Sublime Frequencies. ISBN 978-0-9966785-2-0.
