= King Tears Bat Trip (album) =

Studio album by King Tears Bat Trip
- Released: March 24, 2012
- Recorded: April 16 – November 18, 2011
- Studio: Die Alone Studios, Seattle, WA
- Genre: Avant-garde jazz, free jazz
- Length: 36:39
- Label: Table & Chairs

King Tears Bat Trip is the eponymously titled debut studio album of King Tears Bat Trip, released on March 24, 2012 by Table & Chairs Records. Influenced by Haitian Voodoo rhythms and the avant-garde jazz of Albert Ayler, the album was critically well-received and made the band a favorite of the Northwest's burgeoning DIY scene. It was remastered by Scott Colburn re-issued on vinyl by Debacle Records on June 10, 2014.

== Track listing ==
All music is composed by Luke Bergman, Thomas Campbell, Kristian Garrard, Chris Icasiano, Brandon Lucia, Neil Welch and Evan Woodle.

No.	Title	Length
1.	"Stolen Police Car"	18:37
2.	"Elevenogram"	18:02

== Personnel ==
Adapted from the King Tears Bat Trip liner notes.

King Tears Bat Trip

- Luke Bergman – electric guitar, percussion, mixing
- Thomas Campbell – drums
- Kristian Garrard – drums
- Chris Icasiano – drums
- Brandon Lucia – electronics, percussion (2)
- Neil Welch – tenor saxophone, percussion
- Evan Woodle – drums

Production and additional personnel

- Kristian Garrard – mastering, cover art, design

== Release history ==
Region	Date	Label	Format	Catalog
United States	2012	Table & Chairs	CS	
United States	2014	Debacle	LP	DBL073
