= Omar Khorshid =

Egyptian guitarist (1945–1981)

Omar Khorshid عمر خورشيد
- Born: Omar Mohamed Omar Khorshid عمر محمد عمر خورشيد; April 9, 1945; Cairo, Egypt
- Died: May 29, 1981 (aged 36) Pyramids of Giza road, Egypt
- Genres: Western music, Egyptian music
- Occupations: Musician, composer, accompanist, actor
- Instruments: Guitar, electric keyboard, vocals, violin
- Years active: Early 1960s–1981
- Formerly of: Umm Kulthum; Abdel Halim Hafez

Omar Khorshid (Arabic: عمر خورشيد; April 9, 1945 – May 29, 1981) was an Egyptian guitarist, musician, composer, accompanist and actor. Born in Cairo, he was a well-known guitarist who accompanied many singers, including Farid Al Atrash, Umm Kulthum, Mohamed Abdel Wahab and Abdel Halim Hafez.

== Biography ==
As a child, Khorshid taught himself the violin, guitar and piano which eventually led him to a private music institute in downtown Cairo for further education. In 1966, he formed a band with friends called Les Petits Chats (The Small Cats), a band that played music influenced by Western sounds. The group played in small venues and eventually worked its way up in terms of fame in Egypt.

Following Egyptian political turmoil and from 1973 to 1977, Khorshid was forced to leave and move to Lebanon where he began recording albums under his own name for Lebanese record labels such as Voice of the Orient and Voice of Lebanon. Working with the audio engineer Nabil Moumtaz at Polysound Studios in Beirut, he worked harder to progress his musical style. In 1977, the Egyptian president Anwar Sadat invited Khorshid to perform in the United States at the White House for the American president, Jimmy Carter, during one of the ceremonies for the peace treaty between Egypt and Israel. Khorshid happily accepted the invitation and was one of the guitarists at the ceremony. Though many saw this performance as peaceful, conservatives in the Middle-East who saw the United States as Zionist viewed it as a wrong act and many countries cut ties with Egypt following its peace treaty.

In 1978, Khorshid spent a year in Syria, acting in films and performing at various venues. In 1979, driven by a bigger desire for cinematic fulfillment, he returned to Egypt to pursue a film career. He directed and acted in films and performed live until his death in 1981.

== Personal life ==
Khorshid spoke fluent Arabic, French and English.

He was married four times. At the age of 26, he married an Egyptian businesswoman, Amina El-Sobky. The marriage lasted from 1971 to 1972 when they divorced amicably. His second marriage was to an Egyptian actress, Mervat Amin, another year-long marriage that also ended in an amicable divorce. Soon afterwards, he met a businesswoman named Dina in Lebanon and they began a relationship. They were engaged by 1975 and married by early 1977. However, while they were still married, Khorshid met the Egyptian artist and former singer Maha Abu Ouf during a performance of hers with the Egyptian band Four M. They grew attached to each other and, while still married to Dina, Khorshid married her in early 1981. Abu Ouf was pregnant when Khorshid was killed, though she suffered a miscarriage on finding out about his death.

=== Death ===
On May 29, 1981, Khorshid was driving at a high speed on El Haram Street in Giza, Egypt, with his wife, Dina, when he lost control of the vehicle and collided with a street light pole. Though Dina suffered critical injuries, she survived. Khorshid was ejected from his seat and suffered blunt trauma to his skull, neck and spine, killing him instantly.

== Legacy ==
Khorshid's musicality in orchestra performances, original songs and film scores was considered revolutionary at the time in the Middle East. His extensive theoretical knowledge, fusion of Western and Eastern music and incorporation of different, more modern instruments such as the electric guitar, electric keyboard and synthesizer in Arabic music was previously unheard of. His unique style inspired many aspiring musicians not only in the Middle East, but in Europe and the Americas. His mixing of "modern" western electric instruments with older Eastern tunes spawned a new, more modern sound of electric music that many use for discos today.

The Freak of Araby, an album by Sir Richard Bishop released on May 26, 2009, includes cover versions of several songs written by Khorshid.

== Selected discography ==
A list of selected works by Omar Khorshid.

- Belly Dance with Omar Khorshid [Voix d'Orient - GVDL 9]
- Belly Dance with Omar Khorshid Vol. 2 [Voix d'Orient - GVDL 202]
- Belly Dance with Omar Khorshid Vol. 3 [Voix d'Orient - GVDL 203]
- Belly Dance from Lebanon [Voix d'Orient - GVDL 521]
- Omar Khorshid: Tribute to Oum Kalsoum [Voix d'Orient - GVDL 223]
- Omar Khorshid: Tribute to Farid El Atrache [Voix d'Orient - GVDL 248]
- Rhythms from the Orient [Voice of Lebanon - VLMC 39]
- Omar Khorshid with Love [Voice of Lebanon - VLMC 87]
- Omar Khorshid with Love Vol. 2 [Voice of Lebanon - VLMC 88]
- Guitar El Chark
