= Free Music Archive =

Online repository of royalty-free music

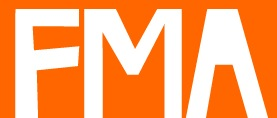
- Website type: Royalty-free music repository
- Owner: Tribe of Noise
- Website: freemusicarchive.org
- Commercial: Yes
- Registration: Optional
- Content license: Various Creative Commons licenses

2 examples: Example one: Steve Combs, Delta Is - Theme Q, Instrumental, 4 min 53 s

Example 2: Rafael Archangel - Dusty Chords, Instrumental, Easy listening, 1 min 34 s

The Free Music Archive (FMA) is an online repository of royalty-free music, currently based in the Netherlands. Established in 2009 by the East Orange, New Jersey community radio station WFMU and in cooperation with fellow stations KBOO and KEXP, it aims to provide music under Creative Commons licenses that can be freely downloaded and used in other works. The service launched with an emphasis on curating high-quality works in a manner "designed for the age of the internet". Users can also "tip" musicians via donations.

While the Free Music Archive is free and open to anyone regardless of registration or other requirements, written and audio content is curated, and permission to upload/edit content is granted on an invitation basis.

In 2018, WFMU announced that it would shut down the FMA due to dwindling funding. In December 2018, the site was acquired by KitSplit and in 2019 by Tribe of Noise.

== History ==
Managing director Jason Sigal explained that due to the SoundExchange royalty scheme, "outdated copyright law and the looming possibility of unfairly high royalties make it difficult to provide audio on-demand, to podcast, to archive, even to stream online", and that the station was being forced to pay royalties for lesser-known artists, while commercial stations were "getting bribed with mountains of cocaine and Ferraris and stuff to play the same top-40 artists that everyone already knows about." He added that the archive "[combined] the user-generated content with the curatorial role that WFMU has always played." Other curators involved in the service included KEXP-FM, Dublab, KBOO, ISSUE Project Room, and CASH Music among others.

In 2012, the FMA held a contest, challenging users to create videos remixing audio from the FMA with video content from the Prelinger Archives.

In 2013, the FMA held another contest, challenging users to compose a royalty-free alternative to "Happy Birthday to You" (a song which, at the time, was encumbered by copyright claims by Warner Chappell Music, invalidated in 2015 as the result of a lawsuit), featuring judges such as Jonathan Coulton. The contest was won by Monk Turner and Fascinoma.

In 2015, the FMA held a contest, challenging users to create videos remixing audio from the FMA with video content which in the public domain (from the Prelinger Archives) calls "Unreel Trailers: A Challenge".

In 2016, the archive surpassed 100,000 songs hosted.

On November 7, 2018, it was announced that the Free Music Archive would be shutting down permanently on November 16, 2018. Existing files would be moved to the Internet Archive collection, but it would effectively end as a growing, ongoing project. Director Cheyenne Hohman noted that its funding from the National Endowment for the Arts had been reduced significantly, and that "material support" for the arts had been "dwindling". The closing date was later pushed back to December 1. On December 12, 2018, it was announced that the service had been acquired by equipment rental service KitSplit, who pledged to ensure its continued operation. However, on September 19, 2019, Kitsplit announced that it had sold the FMA to Tribe of Noise - a group also focusing on the distribution and promotion of free content music under Creative Commons licenses.

== Funding ==
Initial funding for the Free Music Archive came from the New York State Music Fund, a program of Rockefeller Philanthropy Advisors. Additional funding support came from the John D. and Catherine T. MacArthur Foundation, by the National Endowment for the Arts, and from the project's users.
