= Sun City Girls =

American musical group

- Origin: Phoenix, Arizona
- Genres: Experimental rock; avant-rock; free improvisation
- Years active: 1979–2007
- Labels: Placebo, Majora, Nauscopy, Eclipse, Amarillo, Abduction, Pulp Records
- Past members: Alan Bishop; Richard Bishop; Charles Gocher

Sun City Girls was an American experimental rock band formed in 1979 in Phoenix, Arizona. From 1981, the group consisted of Alan Bishop (bass guitar, vocals), his brother Richard Bishop (guitar, piano, vocals), and Charles Gocher (drums, vocals). Their name was inspired by Sun City, Arizona, an Arizona retirement community. In 2007, Gocher died following a long battle with cancer, bringing an end to the group. In a 26-year career, they produced 50 albums, 23 cassettes, 6 feature-length videos, and many other recordings.

Operating in indie rock and underground music circles, Sun City Girls recorded numerous critically acclaimed albums, released in small editions by labels like Placebo, Majora, Eclipse Records, Amarillo Records, and their own Abduction Records, and has garnered a devoted cult following. Their music was hugely eclectic and varied, spreading across genres such as spoken word, free improvisation, jazz and rock, along with a recurring interest in world music. Their records typically incorporated lyrics that rely heavily on their interests in mysticism, paranormal topics (especially UFOs), religious cults and other esoterica, often also manifested in their song titles and album art. Performances by the group were often wildly unpredictable, sometimes verging on performance art, with elaborate costumes, kabuki-inspired makeup, and the creation of a festive, ritualistic atmosphere with audience participation.

Critic Steve Leggett writes, "Throughout its history SCG has remained a challenging, unpredictable, and eclectic musical unit, operating outside the commercially driven aspirations of the mainstream recording industry, and the group has become somewhat of a beacon to independent musicians and artists everywhere." Writing in the Village Voice, Ted Hendrickson argues, "They've never made any sense, conventionally speaking, and that's what makes them them."

== History ==
As children in Michigan, Richard and Alan Bishop took childhood musical inspiration from their grandfather, who was a Lebanese oud player. According to Richard,

His house also doubled as a meeting place for his fellow lodge members who were well versed in the Knights Templar doctrine and the Egyptian Rites of Memphis and Mithrais. They didn't buy into the "Christianization of Freemasonry" which took place at the "official" temples around town, so they met on their own on a regular basis. They still believed in the ways of the old country. There was a weird "Arabian Nights" type of magic in that house, both light and dark. My most vivid childhood dreams and experiences took place there and they were dark indeed. By the age of 10, I had an entire pantheon of different spirits catalogued in my head. But nothing about it was disturbing, it was just the way it was. It's very hard to relate what the atmosphere was all about unless one has experienced similar surroundings, but suffice it to say, I couldn't have asked for a better environment.

The band originated in the Arizona punk rock scene which included Meat Puppets, JFA and The Feederz, Sun City Girls quickly began to incorporate lengthy improvisations, beat poetry, surf music, jazz, tape music, and elements of South Asian, South American, Middle Eastern and African music.

Until the late 1980s, most of the band's releases were issued on audio cassettes, which gained legendary status among cassette culture enthusiasts. But a shift to the LP format had already begun with seminal records such as Sun City Girls (1984), Grotto of Miracles (1986), Torch of the Mystics (1990), Dawn of the Devi (1991), Bright Surroundings Dark Beginnings (1993), and Kaliflower (1994). Dante's Disneyland Inferno and 330,003 Crossdressers From Beyond the Rig Veda, both double-CDs released in 1996, were perhaps the pinnacle of the band's aesthetic. Frequent SCG collaborators included violinist Eyvind Kang and sound engineer Scott Colburn.

As of 2008, the band's remaining members reside in Seattle, Washington. Alan Bishop heads the label Sublime Frequencies and performs and releases records under the names Alvarius B and Uncle Jim. In the early 1980s, he was in the short-lived band Paris 1942, with Maureen Tucker from the Velvet Underground. In 2005, he edited a compilation titled Crime and Dissonance of Ennio Morricone's late 1960s and early 1970s soundtrack work. Rick Bishop performs as a solo guitarist under the name Sir Richard Bishop. Charles Gocher released a solo CD called Pint Sized Spartacus in 1997, and performed with a number of groups, including the Master Musicians of Bukkake, Tripod, and the New Session People.

After Gocher's death, Alan and Rick Bishop announced that they would no longer perform, nor record music using the Sun City Girls name. However, they do plan to release existing archival Sun City Girls recordings as time permits.

== Discography ==
Note: The cassettes released by Cloaven c. 1987–1990 are listed in the order they were released. The dates of the recordings appear after the album titles.

Studio albums

- Sun City Girls LP (Placebo) 1984
- Grotto of Miracles LP (Placebo) 1986
- Horse Cock Phepner (Placebo) LP/CS 1987
- Torch of the Mystics LP (Majora) 1990, CD reissue (Tupelo) 1993
- Dawn of the Devi LP (Majora) 1991
- Valentines From Matahari LP (Majora) 1993, CD reissue (Majora) 1998
- Kaliflower CD/LP (Abduction) 1993
- Jacks Creek LP (Abduction) 1994
- Dante's Disneyland Inferno 2-CD (Abduction) 1996, 3-LP reissue (Locust) 2002
- 330,003 Crossdressers From Beyond the Rig Veda 2-CD (Abduction) 1996, 3-LP reissue (Locust) 2001
- Funeral Mariachi LP/CD (Abduction) 2010

Soundtrack albums

- Juggernaut LP (Abduction) 1994
- Piasa...Devourer of Men LP (Abduction) 1994
- Dulce LP (Abduction) 1998
- Mister Lonely: Music From A Film By Harmony Korine with J. Spaceman LP/CD (Drag City) 2008

Compilation albums

- Box of Chameleons 3-CD box (Abduction) 1997
- Singles Volume 1 CD (Abduction) 2008
- Singles Volume 2 CD (Abduction) 2009
- Singles Volume 3 CD (Abduction) 2013

7-inch singles

- And So The Dead Tongue Sang (Pulp) 1987
- You're Never Alone With a Cigarette (Majora) 1990
- Three Fake Female Orgasms 2×7″ (Majora) 1991
- Let's Just Lounge (Majora) 1992
- Napoleon and Josephine (Scratch) 1992
- Caroliner tribute (Nuf Sed) 1992 [split with Thinking Fellers Union Local 282]
- Eye Mohini (Majora) 1992
- Borungku Si Derita double 7-inch (Majora) 1993 [also issued as a single 7-inch]
- Live...For Chilly (bootleg) 1993
- Carl the Barber 2003 [split 7-inch with Carl Wellman]
- Uncle Jim's True Confessions of Homeland Security (Empirical) 2003

Live albums

- Live from Planet Boomerang 2-LP (Majora) 1992
- Live at C.O.N. Artists LP (Poon Village) 1993
- Bright Surroundings Dark Beginnings LP (Majora) 1993, CD reissue (Majora) 1998
- Live from the Land of the Rising Sun City Girls CD (Japan Overseas) 1997
- Cameo Demons and Their Manifestations CD (Abduction) 2000 – CFR vol. 1
- The Dreamy Draw CD (Abduction) 2000 – CFR vol. 2
- Superculto CD (Abduction) 2000 – CFR vol. 3
- A Bullet Through the Last Temple CD (Abduction) 2000 – CFR vol. 4
- Severed Finger With a Wedding Ring CD (Abduction) 2000 – CFR vol. 5
- Sumatran Electric Chair CD (Abduction) 2001 – CFR vol. 6
- Libyan Dream CD reissue (Abduction) 2001 – CFR vol. 7
- The Handsome Stranger CD (Abduction) 2001 – CFR vol. 8
- High Asia/Lo Pacific 2-CD reissue (Abduction) 2001 – CFR vols. 9 & 10
- Wah CD (Abduction) 2002
- Flute and Mask CD (Abduction) 2002
- God is My Solar System/Superpower 2-LP reissue (Eclipse) 2003
- Bleach Has Feelings, Too!/To Cover Up Your Right To Live 2-LP reissue (Eclipse) 2003
- Carnival Folklore Resurrection Radio 2-CD (Abduction) 2004 – CFR vols. 11 & 12
- The Fresh Kill of a Cape Hunting Dog / Def In Italy 2-LP reissue (Eclipse) 2004
- 98.6 IS DEATH CD (Abduction) 2004 – CFR vol. 13
- Folk Songs of the Rich and Evil / Exotica on $5 a Day 2-LP reissue (Eclipse) 2005
- Uncle Jim's Superstars of Greenwich Meantime LP (Black Velvet Fuckere Records) 2005
- Static from the Outside Set CD (Abduction) 2006 – CFR vol. 14
- Uncle Jim's Superstars of Greenwich Meantime CD reissue (Abduction) 2006
- Live Room CD (Three Lobed) 2006
- Montreal Pop CD
- Djinn Funnel LP (Nashazphone) 2006
- Piano Bar LP (Ri Be Xibalba) 2006
- For Drummers Only LP (Ri Be Xibalba) 2006
- Beginnings Dark LP (Enterruption) 2007
- Live at the Sky Church – September 3rd, 2004 LP & DVD (Twenty One Eighty Two Recording Company) 2020

Cassettes

- Midnight Cowboys from Ipanema CS (Breakfast Without Meat) 1986, LP/CD reissue (Amarillo Records) 1994
- God is My Solar System 1982 CS (Cloaven) 1987
- Superpower 1982–83 CS (Cloaven) 1987
- Hatchet Rain 1983 CS (Cloaven) 1987
- Bleach Has Feelings, Too! 1983–85 CS (Cloaven) 1987
- To Cover Up Your Right To Live 1983–85 CS (Cloaven) 1987
- Def in Italy 1984 CS (Cloaven) 1987
- Folk Songs of The Rich and Evil 1985 CS (Cloaven) 1987
- Fresh Kill of a Cape Hunting Dog 1985–86 CS (Cloaven) 1987
- Exotica on Five Dollars a Day 1986 CS (Cloaven) 1987
- Fruit of The Womb 1986 CS (Cloaven) 1987
- Polite Deception 1986 CS (Cloaven) 1987
- Famous Asthma 1986–87 CS (Cloaven) 1987
- The Palm Leaves of Victory 1986–87 CS (Cloaven) 1987
- Cloaven Theatre No. 1 1987 CS (Cloaven) 1987
- Cloaven Theatre No. 2 1987 CS (Cloaven) 1987
- Tibetan Jazz 666 1987 CS (Cloaven) 1987
- The Multiple Hallucinations of an Assassin 1987–88 CS (Cloaven) 1989
- Cloaven Theatre No. 3 1988 CS (Cloaven) 1989
- Audio Letter to Mitch Meyers 1988 CS (Cloaven) 1989
- That Old Western Sieve 1988 CS (Cloaven) 1989
- Graverobbing in the Future 1988 CS (Cloaven) 1989
- Extra-Sensory Defection CS (Cloaven) 1989
- The Great North American Tricksters CS (Cloaven) 1990
- Pelican 92 CS (Abduction) 1993
