= Charles Gocher =

American drummer

Charles Gocher Jr.

Background information
- Born: November 12, 1952
- Died: February 19, 2007 (aged 54)
- Instrument(s): drums, percussion
- Formerly of: Sun City Girls

Charles Gocher Jr. (November 12, 1952 – February 19, 2007) was an American musician, writer and visual artist, most famous for being a founding member, lyricist and drummer of the experimental rock group Sun City Girls. He also released Pint Sized Spartacus, a solo album under his own name, in 1997. Gocher lost a three-year-long battle with cancer on February 19, 2007, in Seattle, aged 54. The two other members of Sun City Girls, brothers Alan and Richard Bishop, embarked on a tour of the United States and Canada called "The Brothers Unconnected" in tribute to Charles' death, featuring showings of the man's video works and stripped-down, acoustic versions of selected Sun City Girls songs, including several tracks written by Gocher himself.
