= Richard Bishop (guitarist) =

American composer, guitarist and singer

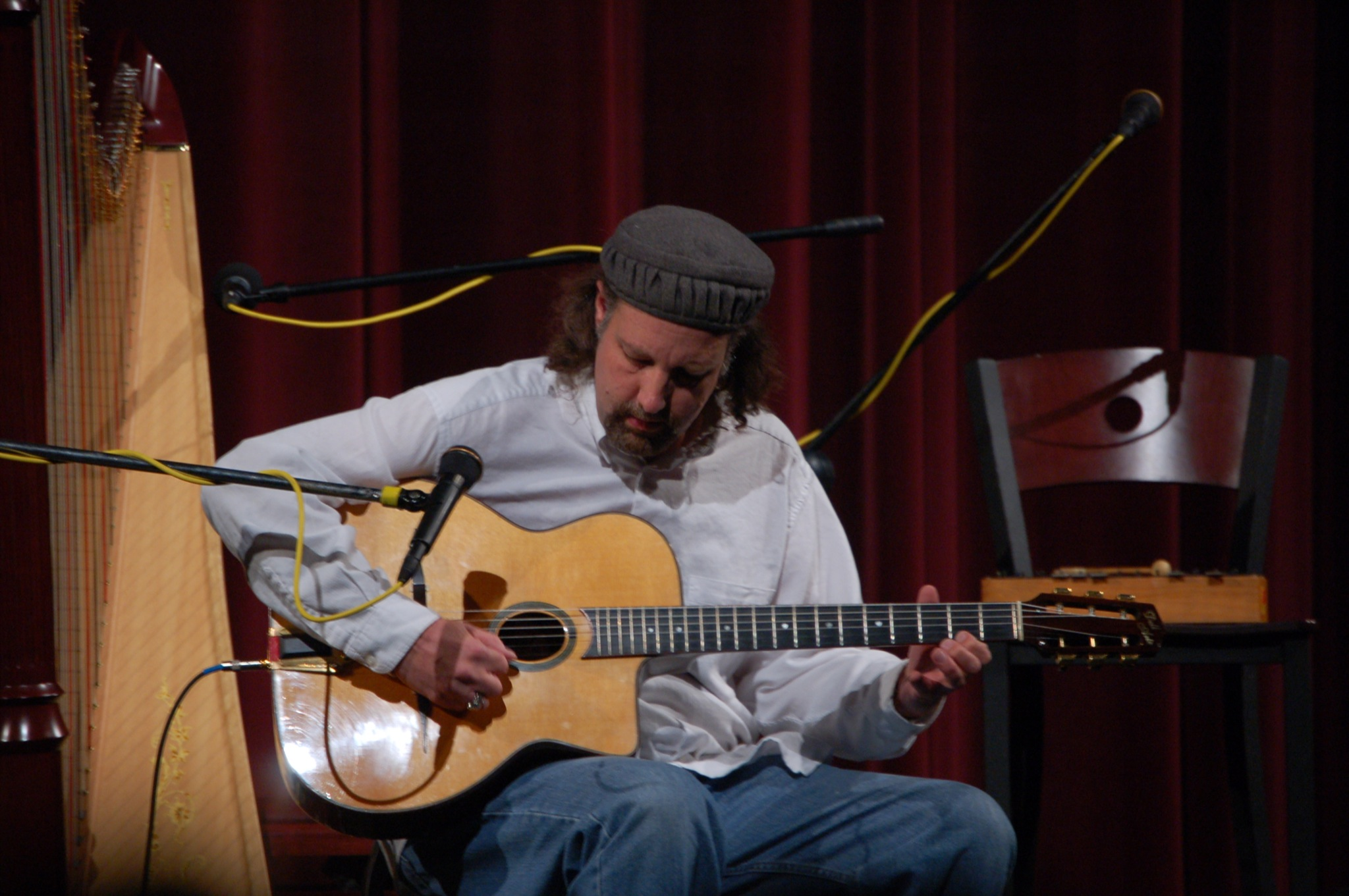
- At Greensboro College, 2006. Photo d&e.

Background information
- Origin: Saginaw, Michigan, United States
- Genres: Experimental
- Occupations: Musician; singer-songwriter; composer
- Instruments: Guitar; vocals
- Years active: 1979–present
- Labels: Drag City; Revenant; Locust Music; Southern
- Website: sirrichardbishop.com

Richard Bishop is an American composer, guitarist and singer best known for his work with the Sun City Girls. He styles himself Sir Richard Bishop.

In 2005, Bishop began performing as a solo artist, playing throughout Europe, Australia, and the United States. He has done extensive touring with Will Oldham (Bonnie Prince Billy), Animal Collective, Devendra Banhart, Bill Callahan, and many others.

Bishop’s first official solo record, Salvador Kali, was released by John Fahey’s esteemed Revenant Records label in 1998. The album showcases Bishop's own particular obsessions and roots, drawing from a variety of worldwide sources. Locust Music issued his second record, Improvika, in 2004. This album consists of nine extemporaneous pieces for solo acoustic guitar. Up next was Fingering the Devil, which was recorded at an impromptu session at London’s Southern Studios on a day off from the 2005 European tour. This was followed by two more releases from Locust: Elektronika Demonika, a recording of electronics, containing no guitar at all; and While My Guitar Violently Bleeds, which is made up of three extended compositions for acoustic and electric guitar. Richard's 30-minute film God Damn Religion was released on DVD by Locust in 2006.

2007 saw the first Sir Richard release from the Drag City label, Polytheistic Fragments. It includes works for acoustic, electric and lapsteel guitar, plus two piano compositions. Next up was The Freak of Araby (Drag City, 2009). This was the first Bishop album to feature a full band of supporting musicians. The record is a tribute to late Egyptian guitarist Omar Khorshid as well as to Middle Eastern music.

In May 2010, Drag City released the album False Flag by Rangda, a new group featuring Bishop, Ben Chasny (Six Organs of Admittance, Comets on Fire), and Chris Corsano (Flower-Corsano Duo, Flaherty/Corsano, Jandek, Björk, etc).

Bishop was a founding member (along with brother Alan Bishop) of experimental rock band Sun City Girls, who during their 26 years (1981–2007), produced an extensive discography of over 50 full length albums, 20 one-hour cassettes and a dozen 7” records. In the early 1980s he was also a member of the group Paris 1942 which included Alan Bishop, Jesse Akkari. Bennie Baresi, David Oliphant and former Velvet Underground drummer Moe Tucker.

In 2003, Richard Bishop, along with Alan Bishop and Hisham Mayet, founded the Sublime Frequencies label, dedicated to acquiring and releasing obscure sights and sounds from Africa, India, S.E. Asia and beyond.

== Discography ==
- Salvador Kali (1998, Revenant Records)
- Improvika (2004, Locust Music)
- Fingering the Devil (2006, Southern Records)
- Elektronika Demonika (2006, Locust Music)
- While My Guitar Violently Bleeds (2007, Locust Music)
- Polytheistic Fragments (2007)
- Earth/Sir Richard Bishop (2008)
- God Damn Religion DVD, (2008, Locust Music)
- The Freak of Araby (2009, Drag City)
- Intermezzo (2012, Ideologic Organ)
- Sir Richard Bishop & W. David Oliphant, Beyond All Defects (2012, Chodpa Media)
- The Unrock Tapes (2012, Unrock)
- Sir Richard Bishop & Bill Orcutt, Road Stories (Kali) (2014, Unrock)
- Tangier Sessions (2015, Drag City)
- Richard Bishop & Ava Mendoza, Ivory Tower (2016, Unrock)
- Richard Bishop & W. David Oliphant, Carte Blanche (2019, Unrock)
- Richard Bishop & Ed Yazijian, Richard Bishop & Ed Yazijian (2019, Unrock)
- Oneiric Formulary (2020, Drag City)
- Hillbilly Ragas (2025, Drag City)
