= Alan Bishop =

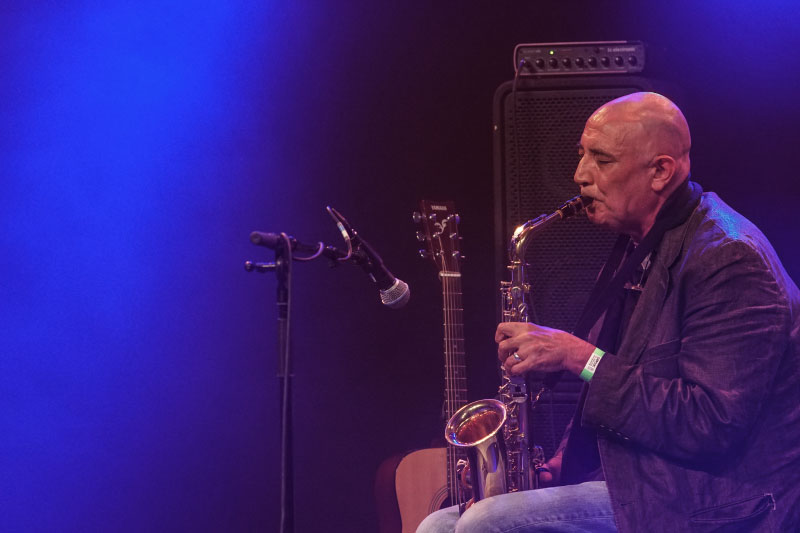
- Bishop at the UJAZZ Festival (Aarhus, Denmark 2017)

Background information
- Also known as: Alvarius B. Uncle Jim
- Born: October 6, 1959 (age 66) Bethesda, Maryland
- Genres: Sound collage
- Occupation(s): Musician and Filmmaker
- Instrument(s): Bass, Sax and many other Eastern instruments
- Years active: 1979–present
- Labels: Placebo, Majora, Abduction, Three Lobed Recordings, Sublime Frequencies and more
- Formerly of: Sun City Girls

Alan Bishop is an American musician best known for being the bassist and vocalist of experimental rock band Sun City Girls. He has also released solo material under the aliases Alvarius B. and Uncle Jim. In the early 1980s Bishop played in the short-lived band Paris 1942 with Maureen Tucker of the Velvet Underground, and was briefly a member of skate punk group JFA. Bishop is now a member of the Cairo-based band The Invisible Hands. He is the co-founder, along with Hisham Mayet, of Sublime Frequencies, a Seattle-based record label focused on collating esoteric music and imagery from all over the world, most notably Southeast Asia, North Africa, and the Middle East.
