= Brainwashed (website) =

Music website and record label

- Website type: Music publication
- Owner: Jon Whitney
- Website: brainwashed.com
- Commercial: No
- Launched: 16 April 1996; 30 years ago
- Current status: Active

Brainwashed is a not-for-profit music website supporting eclectic music. Brainwashed features news, reviews, a podcast, hosts websites for many musical artists and record labels, and has organized two music festivals, Brainwaves. Over fifty people contribute to the archives of Brainwashed. Brainwashed also releases music as Brainwashed Recordings.

== History ==
Brainwashed.com was launched on April 16, 1996 for the purpose of hosting Web sites for various musical artists. The sites contained news, discography, press releases, interviews, photos, merchandise, sound files, lyrics, tour dates when available. The original sites included Meat Beat Manifesto, Greater Than One, Coil, Throbbing Gristle, The Legendary Pink Dots, Nurse With Wound, Current 93, and Cabaret Voltaire. Sites like Meat Beat Manifesto, Coil, and the Legendary Pink Dots were recognized by the artists as official at the time and the URLs were printed in numerous releases, others like Throbbing Gristle, Nurse With Wound, Current 93, and Cabaret Voltaire weren't regarded as official, however were, at the time, the most comprehensive sources for those acts and were often referenced in books (such as Wreckers of Civilisation: The Story of COUM Transmissions & Throbbing Gristle by Simon Ford and England's Hidden Reverse by David Keenan) and magazine articles (such as ones from The Wire).

In 1997, Brainwashed began hosting web sites for record labels including Kranky, RRRecords, Thrill Jockey, and Happy Go Lucky Records, and later hosted sites for Tigerbeat6, Important Records, and World Serpent Distribution. In 1998, Brainwashed launched The Brain, a weekly digest of music news, reviews, new releases, tour dates, and other information about some of the artists and labels hosted on Brainwashed. The Brain was folded into Brainwashed.com in 2005.

== Brainwashed Recordings ==
In 1999, Brainwashed began a small recording label as an extension of the website to issue short run releases of acts who had pages on brainwashed.com.

Artist name	Release title	Date released
Thread	Obsidian Monarch/Null Tributary	March 1, 1999
Edward Ka-Spel	Share The Day/Dream Stealer	June 1, 1999
Greater Than One	Bloodstream/Airstream	September 1, 1999
(various artists)	Brain In The Wire	April 16, 2002
Sybarite (musician)	Dolorous Echo	April 16, 2005
Jessica Bailiff	Live at VPRO Radio	April 16, 2005
Aranos	No Religion	April 16, 2005
(various artists)	Otology: The Brainwashed 7" Singles Compiled	April 16, 2005
Meat Beat Manifesto	Radio Free Republic/Lovefingers	June 1, 2005
Mimir (band)	single	July 6, 2005
He Said 27#11	Oh How To Do Now	November 11, 2006
(various artists)	Brainwaves	November 17, 2006
(various artists)	Brainwaves 2008	November 17, 2008
Fridge	Happiness (with Temporary Residence)	October 2, 2001
Fridge	Eph Reissue (with Temporary Residence)	May 7, 2002

=== Brainwashed Handmade releases ===
Brainwashed Recordings also has a series, Brainwashed Handmade, which features low run CDs in letter-pressed sleeves.

Artist name	Release title	Date released
Windy & Carl	Dedications to Flea	June 3, 2005
The One Ensemble Of Daniel Padden	Live at VPRO Radio	December 5, 2005
Thighpaulsandra	The Lepore Extrusion	October 24, 2006
Greater Than One	Kill the Pedagogue	October 24, 2006
Various Artists	Peace (for mom)	March 6, 2008
Jack Dangers	Music for Planetarium	April 8, 2008

=== Brainwashed Archives releases ===
Brainwashed Recordings also has a sub-label, Brainwashed Archives, which specializes in deluxe remastered reissues.

Artist name	Release title	Date released
Greater Than One	All the Masters Licked Me 2xCD	September 1, 2008
Greater Than One	London 2xCD+DVD	September 1, 2008
Greater Than One	G-Force 3xCD	September 1, 2008

=== Killer Pimp releases ===
Brainwashed Recordings also has a sub-label, Killer Pimp, which has released albums by Kate Mosh, Noise/Girl, Blood Money, and A Place To Bury Strangers.

Artist name	Release title	Date released
Kate Mosh	Dynamo	2001
Noise/Girl	Discopathology	2005
Blood Money	Axis of Blood	2006
A Place to Bury Strangers	A Place to Bury Strangers	2007
All The Saints	Fire On Corridor X	2008
Lithops	Mound Magnet pt. 2: Elevations Above Sea Level	2008
Envenomist	The Helix	2009
Ulterior	Kempers Heads	2009
Aidan Baker & Thisquietarmy	A Picture of a Picture	2009
Dead Letters Spell Out Dead Words	Lost in Reflection	2009
Blood Money	Blood Brotherhood	2009
Scratoa	Live in San Anton	2010
Ceremony	Someday	2010
Soundpool	But It's So	2010
Ceremony	Rocket Fire	2010
Soundpool	Mirrors in Your Eyes	2010
Ceremony	Leave Alone / Walk Away	2010
Ceremony	Extended Play	2011
Soundpool	Re-Mirrored	2011

== Brainwashed Radio and podcast ==
In 2000, Brainwashed launched a 24-hour streaming radio station which featured music from the artists and labels that were hosted at brainwashed.com. The stream was discontinued in 2004.

The first episode of Brainwashed Radio: The Podcast Edition was published on December 4, 2004. It primarily features music reviewed and promoted on Brainwashed.com. New episodes are produced and published on average on a weekly basis. In 2016, the podcast incorporated interviews from musical artists on several episodes.

== The Eye ==
The Eye was a video segment that was launched first on May 4, 2003, featuring miniature documentaries on musical acts containing interviews and live footage. Nearly 150 segments were produced.

== Brainwaves Festival ==
The Brainwaves Festival took place on November 17–19, 2006, at the Regent Theater in Arlington, Massachusetts, to celebrate the first 10 years of Brainwashed.com. Performing artists included Z'EV, Nadja, Troum, The Dresden Dolls, Cock ESP, Howard Stelzer, V/Vm, Goodiepal, Greg Davis, Keith Fullerton Whitman, Landing, Aranos, Volcano the Bear, Jessica Bailiff, Christoph Heemann, Windy & Carl, and Thighpaulsandra.

A second Brainwaves Festival took place on November 21–23, 2008, at the Regent Theater again. Performing artists included Marissa Nadler, Silver Apples, Meat Beat Manifesto, Glenn Jones, Nmperign, Major Stars, Rivulets, Gary Wilson, His Name Is Alive, Andrew Liles, Reformed Faction, Little Annie, The Threshold HouseBoys Choir, Matmos, Windy Weber and Benoit Pioulard, Nudge, Boduf Songs, and Stars of the Lid.

== See also ==
- Songs of the Week by Coil
- List of record labels
- Music podcast
