= Jac Jacobsen =

Norwegian designer

Jacob Jacobsen (1901-1996) was a Norwegian designer and founder of Luxo ASA.

== Biography ==
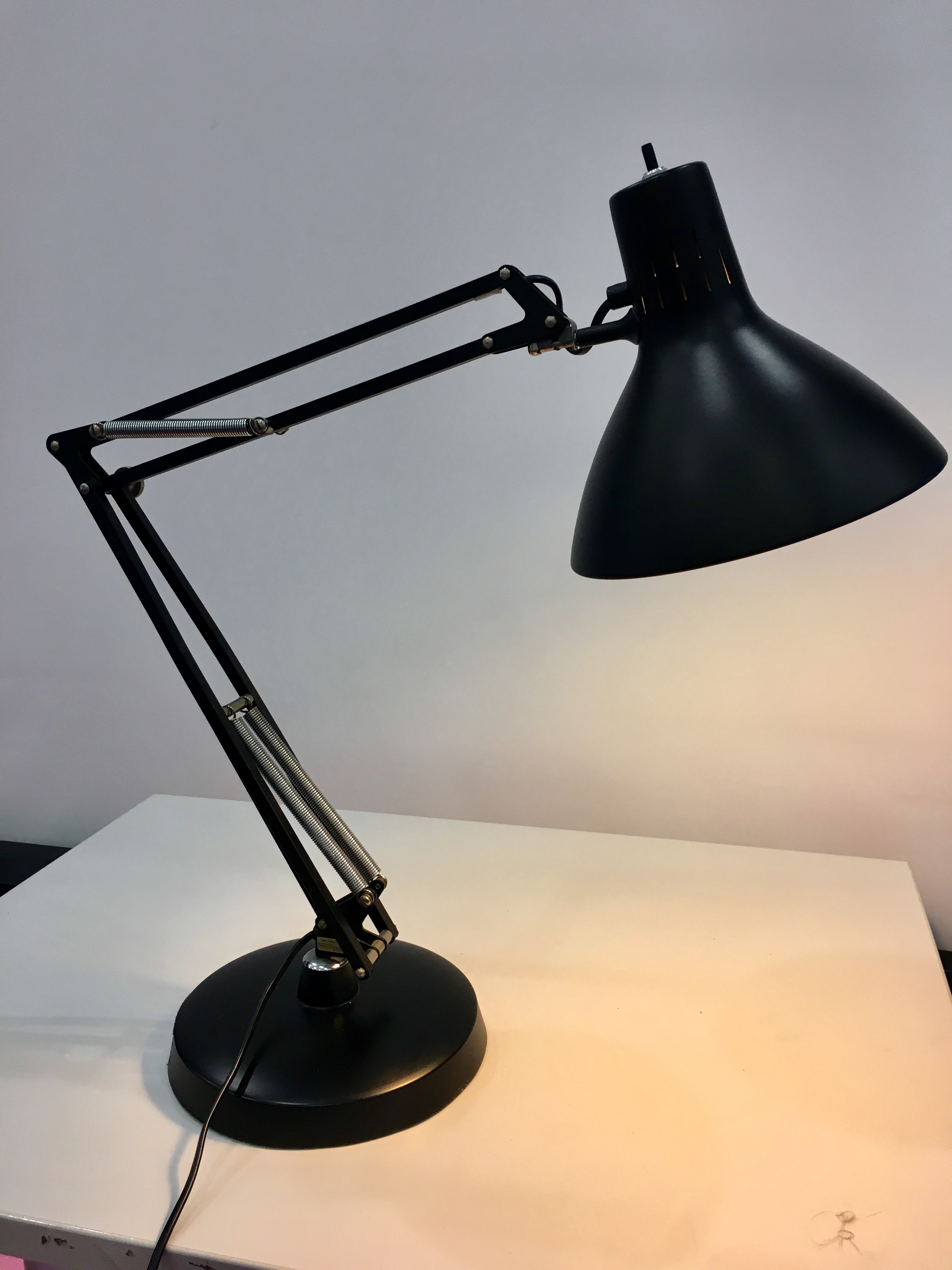
Lamp Luxo-L1, aka Naska Loris

Starting in 1921, Jacobsen worked in the textile industry. In 1934 he founded Luxo ASA, former Jac. Jacobsen A / S, a Norwegian industrial group. It was originally a marketing company for textile machinery. In 1937, he developed the Luxo-L1, a balanced-arm lamp. Today, the lamp is part of various exhibitions in museums around the world, as the lamp is being seen as an example for classic lamp design. The L1 construction principle is based on the Anglepoise lamp, developed by George Carwardine in 1933. Jacob Jacobsen lived to be 95 years old and was active in the company until his last days.

Today the Luxo Group forms part of the Glamox Group. It consists of 14 sales companies and production units, located in 10 countries in both Europe and North America. The head-office is located in Oslo, Norway.

== Trivia ==
The animation film Luxo Jr. by Pixar features the Luxo-L1. It is the source of the small hopping desk lamp included in Pixar's corporate logo.
