= EPHS =

Ephs or EPHS may refer to:

- Williams Ephs, the varsity intercollegiate athletic programs of Williams College
- Ephrin receptor, a protein

== Schools ==
United Kingdom

- Elthorne Park High School, Hanwell, London, England

United States

- Eagle Point High School, Eagle Point, Oregon
- East Paulding High School, Dallas, Georgia
- East Providence High School, East Providence, Rhode Island
- Eden Prairie High School, Eden Prairie, Minnesota
- Elmwood Park High School, Elmwood Park, Illinois
- El Paso High School, El Paso, Texas

== See also ==
- EPH (disambiguation)
