= Anglepoise lamp =

Balanced-arm lamp

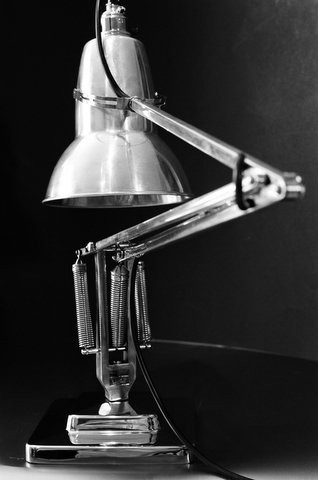
Anglepoise lamp '1227'

The Anglepoise lamp is a balanced-arm lamp designed in 1932 by British designer George Carwardine.

== History and development ==
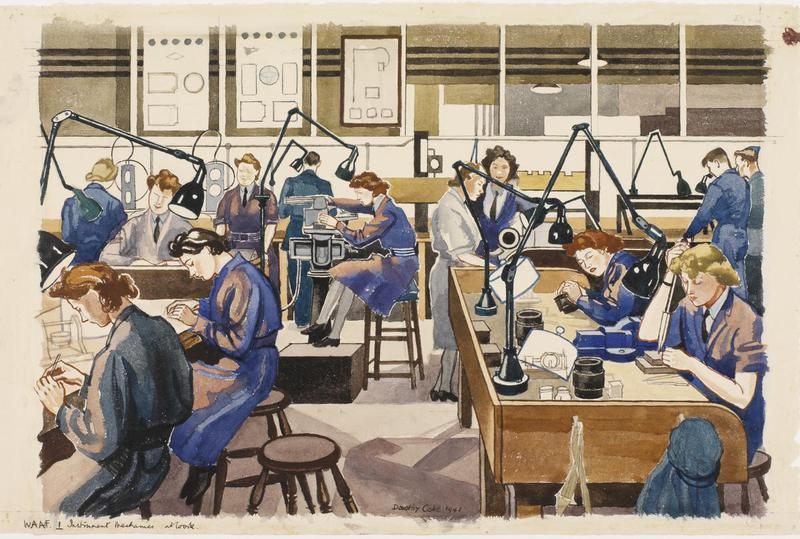
WAAF Instrument Mechanics at Work (1941) by Dorothy Coke

George Carwardine (1887–1947) was a car designer and a freelance design consultant specialising in vehicle suspension systems. While developing new concepts for vehicle suspensions, he created a mechanism which he recognised had applications in other fields. He particularly saw its benefits for a task lamp. Despite many claims to the contrary, his concept had nothing whatsoever to do with mimicking the actions of the human arm. The joints and spring tension allow the lamp to be moved into a wide range of positions which it will maintain without being clamped.

Carwardine applied for a patent, number 404,615, for a design using the mechanism on 4 July 1932, and manufactured the lamp himself in the workshops of his own company, Cardine Accessories, in Bath. He soon found the interest and demand so great that he needed a major expansion or partner and, on 22 February 1934, entered into a licensing agreement with Herbert Terry and Sons in Redditch. Terry's manufactured and marketed the lamp, while Carwardine continued to develop the concept, producing a number of other versions and applications (for example, for supporting microphones). The original four-spring design was made for working environments, such as workshops and doctors' and dentists' surgeries, but he also designed a three-spring version for use in the home, patented on 10 February 1934. (patent number 433,617).

Released in 1935, the 1227 Anglepoise was primarily manufactured for domestic use and proved to be very popular. It was widely promoted by the Terry Spring Company, and when the United Kingdom declared war on Germany on 3 September 1939, it ran an advert the same day describing the 1227 as the "ideal blackout lamp".

Although World War II had a detrimental effect on the production of the standard Anglepoise, the Terry Spring Company produced Anglepoise lamps for the navigator's station in bomber aircraft. According to the Anglepoise website, these were so well produced that when a crashed Vickers Wellington bomber was salvaged from Loch Ness in Scotland in 1985, the lamp still worked after a new battery was installed, this despite it having being submerged for around four decades.

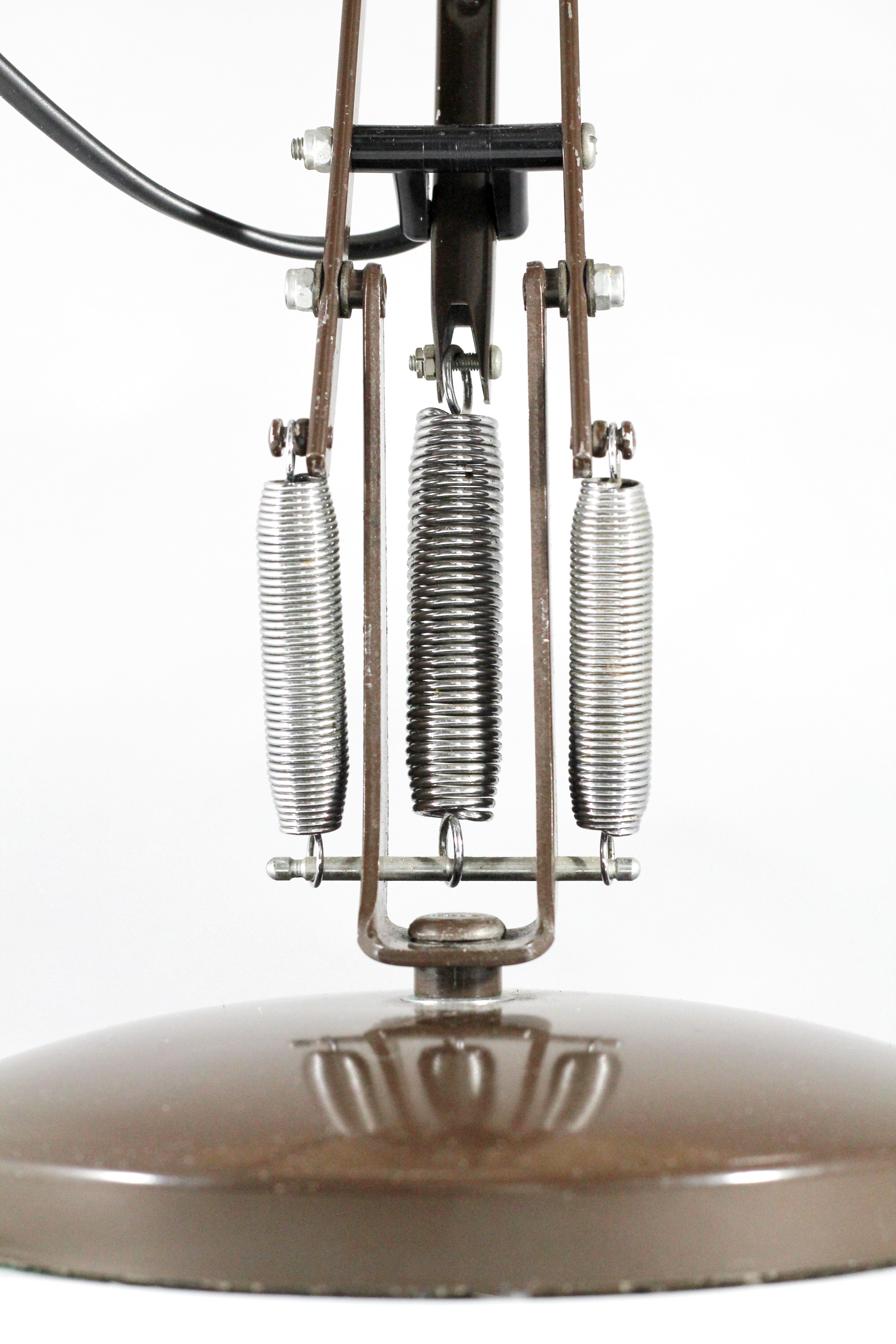
Close-up of the springs on an Anglepoise 90 lamp

A key feature of the Anglepoise design and patent is the placement of all springs (either three or four) near the base. The design was copied by other companies, usually in a simplified form, and is still in use. Some derivatives use a heavy balance weight instead of the springs. The most common version replaces the arm linkages with two independent parallelogram linkages, with a pair of light tension springs on each half of the arm.

The arm has been employed in other devices where it is necessary to hold an object stationary at a convenient point in space, notably the copy holder for typists and in some applications, the computer display screen.

The lamps have been made from a variety of materials over the years, evolving from the early full steel prototypes into later models made from brass and aluminium.

Although the lamp is still marketed as an iconic British design, production for all lamps, except the 1227 Giant model, has been moved to China.

== Anglepoise lamps at the BBC ==
In 1948 the Board of Governors of the BBC asked the head of the Variety Department, Michael Standing, to devise a guiding set of moral standards and protocols for the production of all BBC radio and television programmes. Standing produced what became known within the BBC as the "Green Book", whose purpose was to eradicate smut, innuendo and vulgarity from all BBC programmes. After producing the book Standing took to implementing his guidance with eccentric zeal. In June 1949 he issued a memo to all staff in which he forbade BBC employees to illuminate any room with an Anglepoise lamp unless the main ceiling or wall light was also illuminated: Standing held a firm belief that a man working at a desk in a confined space with only the light from a low-power lamp would nurture furtive ideas and produce degenerate programme material. Director General Sir William Haley later rescinded the Anglepoise lamp edict as unnecessary.

== In culture ==
- "(I Wanna Be an) Anglepoise Lamp" 1978 single by the Soft Boys.
- The protagonist of Salman Rushdie's 1980 novel Midnight's Children, Saleem Sinai, makes repeated references to the Anglepoise lamp in the light of which he writes.
- Peter Gabriel's "Shock the Monkey" 1982 video features "dancing" Anglepoise lamps.
- UK post-rock band Fridge released the "Anglepoised" EP in 1997, compiled on Sevens and Twelves.
- The film company Pixar's first short film Luxo Jr. featured an animated Luxo balanced-arm lamp, which is subsequently featured in all their title sequences.
- In the 2013 album Bambi, Momus used the springs from an Anglepoise Lamp to double for cymbals and coil reverb.

== See also ==
- Balanced-arm lamp
- Industrial design
- Over-illumination
- The Luxo lamp, a 1937 Norwegian derivative of the Anglepoise design
