= Again (Colder album) =

Studio album by Colder
- Released: 7 July 2003
- Recorded: Paris, France
- Genre: Synthpop, electronica, IDM, trip hop
- Length: 44:29
- Label: Output Recordings
- Producer: Marc Nguyen Tan

Colder chronology
Again (2003)	Heat (2005)

Singles from Again
- 1. "Shiny Star" Released: 28 April 2003; 2. "Crazy Love" Released: 10 November 2003

Professional ratings
Review scores
Source	Rating
AllMusic	3/5 stars
Blender	4/5 stars

Again is the debut album from French musician Colder, released by Output Recordings on 7 July 2003. The album was produced in Paris, France, and features the singles "Crazy Love" and "Shiny Star". The album was also released as a special edition with a bonus DVD. The album is currently out of print.

== Track listing ==
All tracks are written by Marc Nguyen Tan

CD
No.	Title	Length
1.	"Crazy Love"	5:11
2.	"Confusion"	4:57
3.	"One Night in Tokyo"	6:23
4.	"Shiny Star"	4:18
5.	"Version"	3:46
6.	"Silicone Sexy"	5:22
7.	"Where"	5:07
8.	"This River"	4:20
9.	"Colder"	5:09

Bonus DVD
No.	Title	Length
1.	"The Untitled Minute and a Half" (video)
2.	"Crazy Love" (video)
3.	"This River" (video)
4.	"Version I" (video)
5.	"Where" (video)
6.	"Colder" (video)

== Personnel ==
- Marc Nguyen Tan – music, vocals, visual material (still and animated)
- Norscq – premastering

== Singles ==
- "Shiny Star" (28 April 2003)
  - 7" vinyl:
    1. "Shiny Star"
    2. "The Slow Descent"
- "Crazy Love" (10 November 2003)
  - CD:
    1. "Crazy Love" (Original Mix)
    2. "Crazy Love" (Mainstream Ensemble's Crazy Love)
    3. "Crazy Love" (Luke Innes' Crazy Love)
    4. "Crazy Love" (Norscq's Crazy Love)
  - 12" vinyl:
    1. "Crazy Love" (Original Mix)
    2. "Crazy Love" (Luke Innes' Crazy Love)
    3. "Crazy Love" (Rework's Crazy Love)
