= Heat (Colder album) =

Studio album by Colder
- Released: 4 July 2005
- Recorded: Paris, France
- Length: 54:10
- Label: Output
- Producer: Marc Nguyen Tan

Colder chronology
Again (2003)	Heat (2005)	Many Colours (2015)

Singles from Heat
- 1. "Wrong Baby" Released: 27 June 2005; 2. "To the Music" Released: 6 February 2006

Heat is the second album from French musician Colder, released by Output Recordings on 4 July 2005. The album was produced in Paris and was released on CD, limited edition CD (housed in a digipak), and limited edition red-coloured 12" vinyl. The album was also released on CD in Mexico with two bonus tracks. All versions of the album are out of print.

== Critical reception ==
Professional ratings
Aggregate scores
Source	Rating
Metacritic	69/100
Review scores
Source	Rating
AllMusic	3/5 stars
Pitchfork	5.1/10

Heat received a score of 69 out of 100 on review aggregator Metacritic based on 11 critics' reviews, indicating "generally favorable" reception.

== Track listing ==
All tracks are written by Marc Nguyen Tan

Heat track listing
No.	Title	Length
1.	"Wrong Baby"	4:54
2.	"Losing Myself"	4:39
3.	"The Winter's Fields"	5:45
4.	"To the Music"	5:28
5.	"Downtown"	5:02
6.	"Tonight"	6:18
7.	"On My Mind"	6:23
8.	"Your Face"	4:37
9.	"Fade Away"	5:27
10.	"Burnt Out"	5:44

Mexican CD edition bonus tracks
No.	Title	Length
11.	"The Slow Descent"	6:08
12.	"All the Pretty Girls"	5:17

== Personnel ==
- Marc Nguyen Tan – music, vocals
- Gael Villeroux – guitar on "To the Music"
- Norscq – mixing, premastering
- Kourtney Roy – cover artwork, photos

== Singles ==
- "Wrong Baby" (27 June 2005)
  - CD:
    1. "Wrong Baby" (Radio Edit)
    2. "Wrong Baby" (Dzir Such a Crush Mix)
    3. "Wrong Baby" (Playgroup Version 1)
    4. "Wrong Baby" (Original Version)
  - 7" vinyl:
    1. "Wrong Baby"
    2. "Le Quart d'Heure" (The Grief cover)
  - 12" vinyl:
    1. "Wrong Baby"
    2. "Wrong Baby" (Issakidis Dzir Dub)
    3. "Wrong Baby" (Playgroup Version 1)
    4. "Wrong Baby" (Playgroup Version 2)
- "To the Music" (6 February 2006)
  - Promo CD:
    1. "To the Music" (Radio Edit)
    2. "To the Music" (Midnight Mike Vocal Remix)
    3. "To the Music" (Lotterboys Remix)
    4. "To the Music" (Engel Remix)
    5. "To the Music" (Arto's Mwarmer Remix)
    6. "To the Music" (Original Version)
  - 12" vinyl #1:
    1. "To the Music" (Original Version)
    2. "To the Music" (Arto's Mwarmer Version)
    3. "To the Music" (Midnight Mike Remix)
    4. "To the Music" (Midnight Mike Dub)
  - 12" vinyl #2:
    1. "To the Music" (Engel Remix)
    2. "To the Music" (Lotterboys Remix)
    3. "To the Music" (Lotterboys Dub)
