= Ceefax (album) =

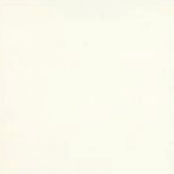

Studio album by Fridge
- Released: 10 March 1997
- Studio: Sam's Room
- Genre: Post-rock; indietronica; experimental techno
- Length: 42:38
- Label: Output
- Producer: Fridge

Fridge chronology
| Ceefax (1997) | Semaphore (1998) |

Professional ratings
Review scores
| Source | Rating |
|---|---|
| AllMusic | 3/5 stars |
| NME | 7/10 |

Ceefax is the debut studio album by English post-rock band Fridge, released on 10 March 1997. The album is notable for the fact that it contains three short tracks – "EDM", "EDM 2" and "EDM 3" – that are influenced by drum and bass.

The CD digipak case is natural-tone paper colour with glossy ink on the front only visible when viewed at certain angles. Track listings and other liner notes are written on the spine.

== Track listing ==
All tracks are written by Fridge.

| No. | Title | Length |
|---|---|---|
| 1. | "EDM" | 1:09 |
| 2. | "Helicopter" | 2:08 |
| 3. | "Tricity" | 6:01 |
| 4. | "More EH-4800" | 11:00 |
| 5. | "FDM" | 0:27 |
| 6. | "Robots in Disguise" | 4:29 |
| 7. | "EDM 2" | 1:09 |
| 8. | "Oracle" | 6:11 |
| 9. | "EDM 3" | 4:40 |
| 10. | "Zed Ex Ay-Ti-Wan" | 5:24 |
| Total length: | | 42:38 |
