= Brain in the Wire =

Compilation album by various artists
- Released: 16 April 2002
- Label: Brainwashed Recordings

Professional ratings
Review scores
Source	Rating
Allmusic	4/5 stars
Pitchfork Media	7.9/10

Brain in the Wire is a compilation by Brainwashed Recordings, which is a collection of mostly rare, unreleased alternate versions of songs by many influential groups that Brainwashed's website promotes hosting for. The first CDs of the set were originally available individually through The Wire and eventually released as a 3-CD box set.

== Track listing ==
=== Brain In The Wire "disc A" ===
1. The Legendary Pink Dots: "Old Sparky" - 5:12
2. V/Vm: "Cha-ha Meat Skran-r The 15lb. Turkey" - 4:01
3. Greater Than One: "Broadcast" - 4:50
4. Twilight Circus Dub Sound System: "Slicer Dubplate (Version 2)" - 5:04
5. Fridge: "Harmonics" - 4:02
6. Ruby Falls: "The Brave Ones" - 3:33
7. Panacea: "Battle Stations (Dub)" - 5:56
8. m²: "L-tuo" - 3:11
9. Jessica Bailiff: "Shadow" - 5:00
10. Cyclobe: "Replaced By His Constellation" - 7:55
11. Windy & Carl: "Trembling" - 7:02
12. Andreas Martin & Christoph Heemann: "Wires" - 4:08
13. Little Annie: "Lullaby" - 3:43
14. Aranos & Nurse With Wound: "Mary Jane" - 6:36
15. Current 93 & Pantaleimon: "The Magical Bird In The Magical Woods" - 5:52

=== Brain In The Wire "disc b" ===
1. Matmos: "You Can't Win" - 8:05
  - featuring: Hrvatski, Lesser
2. Bedhead: "Powder (Live)" - 7:25
3. Meat Beat Manifesto: "Structures (Version)" - 4:47
4. Stars of the Lid: "Requiem For Dying Mothers" - 11:22
5. Diamanda Galás: "Birds Of Death (Live)" - 7:03
6. Gordon Mumma: "Stressed Space Palindromes" - 6:49
7. Volcano The Bear: "New Seeker" - 6:59
8. Tino: "Vice Versa Dub" - 5:19
9. Thighpaulsandra: "Heaven Lies About Us In Our Infancy" - 8:16
10. Cex: "Ad Nauseam" - 4:33
11. !!!: "Hammerhead (TripleShotMonger Mix)" - 5:42

=== Brain NOT In The Wire ===
1. (unknown): "Incriminating Words" - 0:04
2. Coil: "Mayhem Accelerator Part 1" - 12:17
3. Keith Fullerton Whitman: "Piano Concerto #1" - 11:21
4. Signs Of Chaos: "Eurasia" - 5:37
5. Nurse With Wound: "The Purple Ache" - 10:34
6. Kate Mosh: "Across The Universe (Version)" - 6:17
7. Kadane Kadane: "Harvest" - 4:32
8. V/Vm: "My Uncle Is Michael Aspel" - 0:04
9. !!!: "We Were Stoned When We Thought Up The Title Of This And We Didn't Want To Give It A Name That We Had To Explain As 'Oh Yeah We Were Stoned When We Thought Of It' So We're Just Calling It Improvisational Jam 11-02-01" - 8:59
10. Sybarite: "Three Sided" - 4:49
11. Ku-Ling Bros.: "The Apollo Creed" - 4:53
12. Bowery Electric: "Saved (Read/Write/Error Mix)" - 5:24
  - remix: Thread
13. Kid606: "Pregnant Cheerleader Theme Song" - 2:02
