= Semaphore (album) =

Studio album by Fridge
- Released: 16 March 1998
- Genre: Alternative rock, post-rock, indietronica
- Length: 61:08
- Label: Output Recordings

Fridge chronology
Ceefax (1997)	Semaphore (1998)	Eph (1999)

Professional ratings
Review scores
Source	Rating
AllMusic	4.5/5 stars
NME	6/10
The Sunday Times	8/10

Semaphore is the second studio album by Fridge, released in March 1998.

== Critical reception ==
NME wrote: "Fridge have created an album that is deceptive; minimal and monotonous, you coast through a series of seemingly pointless guitar-bass-and-drums instrumentals like 'Teletexed' and 'Chroma' before being softened up for the nerve-rattling sax on the Faust-like 'Low Fat Diet', or the sand-in-your-joints noise of 'Stamper'." The Independent thought that "although there is much rhythmic intrigue here, sometimes the impression is left that the knobs and buttons on synthesizers dictate the melodies."

== Track listing ==
1. "Cassette" (1:23)
2. "Furniture Boy" (7:09)
3. "A Slow" (4:13)
4. "Motorbus" (7:27)
5. "Teletexed" (4:06)
6. "Chroma" (6:08)
7. "Lo Fat Diet" (6:37)
8. "Swerve And Spin" (4:07)
9. "Curdle" (4:53)
10. "Lign" (0:18)
11. "Stamper" (4:56)
12. "There Is No Try" (1:19)
13. "Micheal Knight" (8:32)
