= Sevens and Twelves =

Compilation album by Fridge
- Released: October 19, 1998
- Label: Output Recordings

Professional ratings
Review scores
| Source | Rating |
|---|---|
| AllMusic | 4.5/5 stars |

Sevens and Twelves is a compilation of early singles by Fridge, released October 19, 1998. It compiles all the singles released on Output Recordings, plus a couple of extra tracks.

== Track listing ==
1. Anglepoised (15:03)
2. For Force (4:28)
3. Astrozero (6:36)
4. Jessica (4:34)
5. Simple Harmonic Motion (5:22)
6. Lign (Extended Mix) (0:37)
7. It's All On (3:42)
8. EH4-800 Phase Shifter (2:24)
9. Sequoia (13:01)
10. Orko (8:40)
11. The Traps (5:53)
12. Concert In Your House (2:11)
13. Must Be Magic (5:20)
14. Asthma (6:53)
15. Fisa (3:24)
16. Config (6:22)
17. Lojen (4:08)
18. Distance (10:42)
