= Contact (Silver Apples album) =

Studio album by Silver Apples
- Released: February 1969
- Recorded: 1968
- Length: 40:51
- Label: Kapp
- Producers: Simeon, Danny Taylor, Barry Bryant

Silver Apples chronology
Silver Apples (1968)	Contact (1969)	The Garden (1998)

Singles from Contact
- 1. "You and I" / "Confusion" Released: November 1968

Professional ratings
Review scores
Source	Rating
AllMusic	4.5/5 stars

Contact is the second studio album by American band Silver Apples, released in 1969 by record label Kapp.

== Release ==
Contact was released in 1969 by record label Kapp.

The album was re-released in 1997 by MCA Records compiled with the band's first album, Silver Apples. It was also re-released illegally on compact disc and vinyl in 2003 by Radioactive Records in the UK.

=== Album cover controversy ===
The front and back cover artwork is infamous for generating a lawsuit from Pan Am Airlines. The front features the Silver Apples in a Pan Am cockpit, while the back shows the band amongst plane wreckage playing banjos. The resulting lawsuit by Pan Am against Silver Apples led to the breakup of the band.

== Reception ==
Bart Bealmear of AllMusic wrote: "Aside from Simeon's use of a banjo on a couple of tracks, the music on Contact does not differ from that of their debut. One aspect improved upon was the lyrics; many possess the same 'cosmic' element found on Silver Apples, but others are full of bitterness, pain, paranoia and confusion. In turn, the lead oscillator is used to greater effect, reflecting this newfound intensity."

The Wire placed Contact in their list "One Hundred Records That Set the World on Fire (While No One Was Listening)".

== Track listing ==
All tracks are written by Simeon Coxe III and Danny Taylor, with others noted.

Side A
No.	Title	Writer(s)	Length
1.	"You and I"		3:24
2.	"Water"		4:18
3.	"Ruby"	Joy May Creasy	2:32
4.	"Gypsy Love"	Stanley Warren	5:36
5.	"You're Not Foolin' Me"		6:26

Side B
No.	Title	Writer(s)	Length
1.	"I Have Known Love"	Eileen Lewellen	3:53
2.	"A Pox on You"		5:11
3.	"Confusion"		3:34
4.	"Fantasies"		5:57
Total length:			40:51

== Personnel ==
=== Silver Apples ===
- Danny Taylor – vocals, drums, percussion
- Simeon – vocals, oscillators, banjo

=== Technical ===
- Jack Hunt – engineering
- Charlie Silver – sleeve photography
