= Jessica Bailiff =

American singer-songwriter

- Born: Toledo, Ohio, United States
- Genres: Experimental rock; slowcore; shoegazing; post-rock
- Occupations: Musician; vocalist; songwriter
- Instruments: Vocals; guitar; piano; keyboards; organ
- Years active: 1998–present
- Label: Kranky
- Formerly of: Clear Horizon; Eau Claire; Northern Song Dynasty
- Website: jessicabailiff.tumblr.com

Jessica Bailiff is an American singer-songwriter from Toledo, Ohio. Her music is largely classified as slowcore, although it contains elements of post-rock and shoegaze.

== Biography ==
Bailiff was discovered by Low's Alan Sparhawk, who recommended her earlier demos to Kranky, the label on which Bailiff later recorded.

Bailiff collaborated and released records with acts such as Odd Nosdam of Anticon and cLOUDDEAD fame, Low's Alan Sparhawk, Dave Pearce of Flying Saucer Attack, Casino Versus Japan, Rivulets, and Annelies Monseré, amongst others. Bailiff was also featured on The Wire's Brain in the Wire compilation.

Bailiff released solo studio albums Even in Silence (1998), Hour of the Trace (1999), Jessica Bailiff (2002), Feels like Home (2006), and At the Down-Turned Jagged Rim of the Sky (2012).

== Discography ==
=== Studio albums ===
- Even in Silence (Kranky, 1998)
- Hour of the Trace (Kranky, 1999)
- Jessica Bailiff (Kranky, 2002)
- Northern Song Dynasty (with Jesse Edwards, as Northern Song Dynasty; People the Sky, 2002)
- Clear Horizon (with Dave Pearce, as Clear Horizon; Kranky, 2003)
- Feels like Home (Kranky, 2006)
- At the Down-Turned Jagged Rim of the Sky (Kranky, 2012)

=== Compilation albums ===
- Old Things (Morc Records, 2007)

=== EPs ===
- Eau Claire (with Rachel Staggs, as Eau Claire; Kranky, 2005)

=== Guest appearances ===
- Rivulets – Debridement (Chair Kickers' Union, 2003)
- Rivulets – You've Got Your Own (Acuarela Discos, 2004)
- Odd Nosdam – Untitled Three (Anticon, 2005)
- Rivulets – You Are My Home (Important Records, 2006)

=== Compilation appearances ===
- "Shadow" on Brain in the Wire (Brainwashed Recordings, 2002)
- "Brother La (Twin Scorpio Mix)" on Brainwaves (Brainwashed Recordings, 2006)
- "Chapter 4" on Chamber Music: James Joyce (Fire Records, 2008)
