= Colder (musician) =

French musician, DJ, and graphic designer

Marc Nguyen Tan
- Also known as: Colder
- Origin: Paris, France
- Genres: Downtempo, synth-pop, IDM, trip hop, post-punk
- Years active: 2003–present
- Labels: Output Recordings, Not Available Records, BATAILLE Music Group

Marc Nguyen Tan (born 1974), known professionally as Colder, is a French dance musician and graphic designer who is also a DJ and remixer who remains actively involved in dance music and other projects.

Colder's sound is rooted in the post-punk and post-disco of the late 1970s and early 1980s. Colder is also influenced by dub and krautrock.

== Biography ==
After studying film at university, Tan started to work as junior art director in 1995 for Grolier Interactive, then became art director at the Shaman design studio. He worked as art director for TV on-air design, then directed promos and title sequences as a freelancer for Eurosport cable channel. He co-founded "Le Cabinet. Paris." with Benoit Emery in May 2000.

To date, Tan has released five studio albums under the Colder moniker: Again in July 2003, Heat in July 2005, Many Colours in November 2015, and The Rain and Goodbye, both released simultaneously in June 2016.

As Colder, Tan provided a remix for Depeche Mode's song "Clean" for their 2004 Remixes 81–04 album.

== Discography ==
=== Studio albums ===
- Again (7 July 2003)
- Heat (4 July 2005)
- Many Colours (6 November 2015)
- The Rain (24 June 2016)
- Goodbye (24 June 2016)

=== Singles & EPs ===
- "Shiny Star" (28 April 2003)
- "Crazy Love" (10 November 2003)
- "Wrong Baby" (27 June 2005)
- "To the Music" (6 February 2006)
- "Turn Your Back" (25 May 2015)
- "Midnight Fever" (22 June 2015)
- "Your Kind" (18 December 2015)
- Some Lost Tapes EP (16 April 2016)
- Black Magic EP (collaboration with Kasper Bjørke) (15 September 2017)
