= Benoît-Pierre Emery =

French artist and designer (born 1970)

Benoit Pierre Emery
- Born: 9 July 1970 (age 55); Paris, France
- Education: Royal College of Art, London
- Labels: Benoit Pierre Emery; Louis Vuitton; Hermès; Kenzo

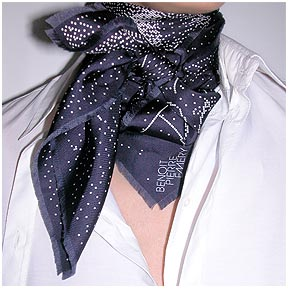
"A tiny space between regrets and nostalgia", a scarf made in Lyon (2003)

Benoît-Pierre Emery (pronounced [bənwa pjɛʁ ɛm(ə)ʁi]; born 9 July 1970) is a French art director and a fashion designer based in Paris, France. He is also creative director of Objets et La Table at Hermès.

A graduate of the Royal College of Art and of the École nationale supérieure des arts décoratifs, Benoit Emery began his career as a freelancer, working as an art director for Canal + and Louis Vuitton.

His experience also includes stints with Paco Rabanne, Kenzo, Cabane De Zucca, The Cartier Foundation, Arte and Paris Première among others. In May 2000, he co-founded the creative agency "Le Cabinet. Paris" with Marc Nguyen Tan.

In October 2003, he set up his own company "Les Soieries Modernes" and launched his first silk scarf collection.

== Collections ==
- 24, Faubourg: To celebrate the 10th anniversary of the introduction of 24, Faubourg in 1995, Hermès issued in 2005 a limited edition of the perfume, in a bottle designed by Serge Mansau to imitate the lines of the silk scarf issued at the same time. The carré de soie was designed by Benoît Pierre Emery and stylizes the spirals of the flacon and the light shining through the perfume. The fragrance is a creation of Maurice Roucel.
- Mosaïque au 24: In 2009, Benoît-Pierre Emery created for Hermès a gold mosaïque collection of tableware.
- Carnets d'Équateur: In 2016, he designed a 35-piece porcelain collection, Carnets d'Équateur, with the paintings of Robert Dallet as the theme.
- Tie Set: In 2017, he unveiled the Tie Set collection, tableware made original with its colorful micro-patterns.
