= EPH =

EPH or Eph may refer to:

== Science and technology ==
- Ephedrine
- Ephrin receptor
- Extractable petroleum hydrocarbons
- Environmental Public Health

== Businesses ==
- Energetický a průmyslový holding, a Czech energy company
- Europapress Holding, now Hanza Media, a Croatian media company

== Transportation ==
- East Pakenham railway station, Melbourne
- Elephant & Castle railway station, in London
- Ephrata station, in Ephrata, Washington, United States
- Ephrata Municipal Airport, Washington, United States

== Other uses ==
- Eph (album), by British post-rock band Fridge
- E Pluribus Hugo voting system used by the Hugo Awards, a single divisible vote with least popular elimination
- Epistle to the Ephesians, a book of the Christian Bible
- Williams Ephs, the athletic teams at Williams College
