= Silver Apples (album) =

Studio album by Silver Apples
- Released: June 1968
- Genres: Electronic; psychedelia
- Length: 32:27
- Label: Kapp
- Producers: The Magical Theatre Partnership; Barry Bryant

Silver Apples chronology
| Silver Apples (1968) | Contact (1969) |

Singles from Silver Apples
- 1. "Whirly-Bird" / "Oscillations" Released: June 1968

Silver Apples is the debut studio album by the American band Silver Apples. It was released in June 1968 by record label Kapp. It was the band's most successful original album, reaching 193 on the Billboard 200.

The album was re-released in 1997 by MCA Records and was compiled with the band's second album, Contact. It has been critically acknowledged as a pioneering fusion of rock and electronic music.

== Music ==
The Guardian stated that Danny Taylor's drumming style, sounded "like a Can album, even though the krautrock pioneers had yet to put a record out at that point".

Professional ratings
Review scores
| Source | Rating |
|---|---|
| AllMusic | 4/5 stars |
| Sputnikmusic | 4/5 |

== Legacy ==
Adam Bunch of Crawdaddy! wrote in 2007: "Silver Apples is a record that reached far ahead of its time. It's not surprising then, in a year when the airwaves were still dominated by Motown and the Beatles (whose experimentation was tame by comparison), that it failed to garner much of an audience. Even now, nearly forty years later, the record sounds fresh and unconventional – in 1968 there simply wasn't anything else like it." The Vinyl Factory included the record as one of the best electronic albums of the 1950s and 1960s, calling the album "a stunning collection of rickety electronic grooves and hydraulic wheezes", noting that "the compositions are often harmonically static, giving the record a driving, hypnotic quality. There’s not a bum track on it."

The track "Oscillations" placed at number 119 on Pitchfork's list of "The 200 Greatest Songs of the 1960s", while it placed 48th on a similar list by NME. The album itself would later be ranked by Pitchfork as the 77th best of the decade, while Spin ranked it 25th on their list of "The Top 100 Alternative Albums of the 1960s".

The Beatles' John Lennon was a fan of the album, alongside Jimi Hendrix.

== Track listing ==
All tracks are written by Simeon Coxe III, Danny Taylor, and Stanley Warren except where noted.

Side A
| No. | Title | Length |
|---|---|---|
| 1. | "Oscillations" | 2:48 |
| 2. | "Seagreen Serenades" | 2:55 |
| 3. | "Lovefingers" | 4:11 |
| 4. | "Program" | 4:07 |
| 5. | "Velvet Cave" | 3:30 |

Side B
| No. | Title | Writer(s) | Length |
|---|---|---|---|
| 1. | "Whirly-Bird" | | 2:41 |
| 2. | "Dust" | | 3:40 |
| 3. | "Dancing Gods" | Navajo Indian Ceremonial | 5:57 |
| 4. | "Misty Mountain" | Simeon; Taylor; Eileen Lewellen | 2:47 |
| Total length: | | | 32:27 |

== Personnel ==
Silver Apples

- Dan Taylor – drums, percussion, vocals
- Simeon – oscillators, flute, vocals

Technical

- Don Van Gorden – engineering
- Anonymous Arts – sleeve art
- Virginia Dwan – sleeve photography

== Charts ==
| Chart (1968) | Peak position |
|---|---|
| US Billboard 200 | 193 |
