= Luxo =

Norwegian manufacturer of lamps

Luxo ASA
- Company type: Subsidiary
- Industry: Manufacturing
- Founded: 1934
- Founder: Jac Jacobsen
- Headquarters: Oslo, Norway
- Products: Lamps
- Parent: Glamox
- Website: www.luxous.com

Luxo ASA is a Norwegian manufacturer of lamps. Based in Oslo, it has sales throughout Europe and North America, with production plants in Norway, Sweden, and Keila, Estonia. The company was founded in 1934 and was listed on the Oslo Stock Exchange.

In 1937, Jac Jacobsen, the founder of Luxo, invented the Luxo L-1 lamp (a modification of the earlier Anglepoise lamp). The lamp, a type of balanced-arm lamp was the inspiration for the 1986 animated short film, Luxo Jr., by Pixar Animation Studios. The short subsequently became the subject of a lawsuit from Luxo.

== See also ==
- Luxo Jr. – Desk lamp & mascot of Pixar Animation Studios
