= At the Down-Turned Jagged Rim of the Sky =

Studio album by Jessica Bailiff
- Released: October 1, 2012
- Recorded: 2011
- Studio: Jessica Bailiff's home
- Length: 40:01
- Label: Kranky

Jessica Bailiff chronology
Feels like Home (2006)	At the Down-Turned Jagged Rim of the Sky (2012)

At the Down-Turned Jagged Rim of the Sky is the fifth solo studio album by American singer-songwriter Jessica Bailiff. It was released on October 1, 2012, through Kranky. It received generally favorable reviews from critics.

== Background ==
Jessica Bailiff is an American singer-songwriter from Toledo, Ohio. At the Down-Turned Jagged Rim of the Sky is her fifth solo studio album, and her first since Feels like Home (2006). She wrote and recorded the album in her home studio. Each song on the album has its own subtitle. The album was released on October 1, 2012, through Kranky.

== Critical reception ==
Professional ratings
Aggregate scores
Source	Rating
Metacritic	77/100
Review scores
Source	Rating
AllMusic	4/5 stars
Beats Per Minute	76%
MusicOMH	4/5 stars
Pitchfork	7.5/10
Tiny Mix Tapes	3.5/5 stars
Uncut	6/10

According to the review aggregator Metacritic, At the Down-Turned Jagged Rim of the Sky received "generally favorable reviews" based on a weighted average score of 77 out of 100 from 6 critic scores.

Ray Finlayson of Beats Per Minute stated, "Somewhat similar to another artist who spent six years on their newest album, the deliberate motions on Jagged Rim bring to mind the careful, troubled world of Scott Walker's Bish Bosch." Fred Thomas of AllMusic called the album "Bailiff's most honest and exposed work yet." He added, "The nine songs here represent her most ambitious and daring experiments yet, while retaining the considerately dreamy core that sets her work apart from any number of other soft-spoken spaceheads." Ned Raggett of Pitchfork commented that "It's focused, without the lengthy experiments, and the flow of the album is coherent." Sam Shepherd of MusicOMH called it "a startling album full of nuance, menace and wonder."

== Track listing ==
All tracks are written by Jessica Bailiff.

At the Down-Turned Jagged Rim of the Sky track listing
No.	Title	Length
1.	"Your Ghost Is Not Enough" (Be with Me)	3:28
2.	"Take Me to the Sun" (So Warm, So Ready)	3:21
3.	"Sanguine" (Please Say a Word)	5:14
4.	"If You Say It" (My Friend, My Love)	3:33
5.	"Violets & Roses" (For a Black Romantic Heart)	3:34
6.	"This Is Real" (Soft & Feral)	4:30
7.	"Goodnight" (Hope for More)	4:53
8.	"Slowly" (Show Me)	5:31
9.	"Firefly" (We Could Be Free)	5:57
Total length:		40:01

== Personnel ==
Credits adapted from liner notes.

- Jessica Bailiff – performance, recording, mixing
- Odd Nosdam – mix polishing
- Jason Ward – mastering
- David Madson – design
