= The Sun (Fridge album) =

Studio album by Fridge
- Released: 11 June 2007 (UK); 19 June 2007 (U.S.)
- Genre: Post-rock, experimental rock
- Length: 47:02
- Label: Text Records; Temporary Residence Limited

Fridge chronology
| Happiness (2001) | The Sun (2007) |

Professional ratings
Review scores
| Source | Rating |
|---|---|
| AllMusic | 4/5 stars |
| Drowned in Sound | 7/10 |
| Pitchfork Media | (5.0/10) |
| Spin | 3.5/5 stars |
| Sputnikmusic | 3.5/5 |
| Stylus Magazine | C |

The Sun is the fifth and final studio album by the English post-rock band Fridge. It was released on 11 June 2007. The vinyl release consists of two records, of which three sides have music, while the fourth side is blank with minimally etched artwork.

== Critical reception ==
Exclaim! wrote that the album "hits several roadblocks, making for an uneven listen full of quick turns, from bedroom layers to warehouse jams." Tiny Mix Tapes declared that "the depth and craft in these songs keep The Sun interesting and make its inspired moments that much better."

== Track listing ==
| No. | Title | Length |
|---|---|---|
| 1. | "The Sun" | 3:20 |
| 2. | "Clocks" | 7:44 |
| 3. | "Our Place In This" | 4:23 |
| 4. | "Drums of Life" | 0:38 |
| 5. | "Eyelids" | 2:44 |
| 6. | "Oram" | 5:52 |
| 7. | "Comets" | 5:19 |
| 8. | "Insects" | 5:18 |
| 9. | "Lost Time" | 5:52 |
| 10. | "Years and Years and Years..." | 5:52 |
