= Silver Apples =

American musical duo

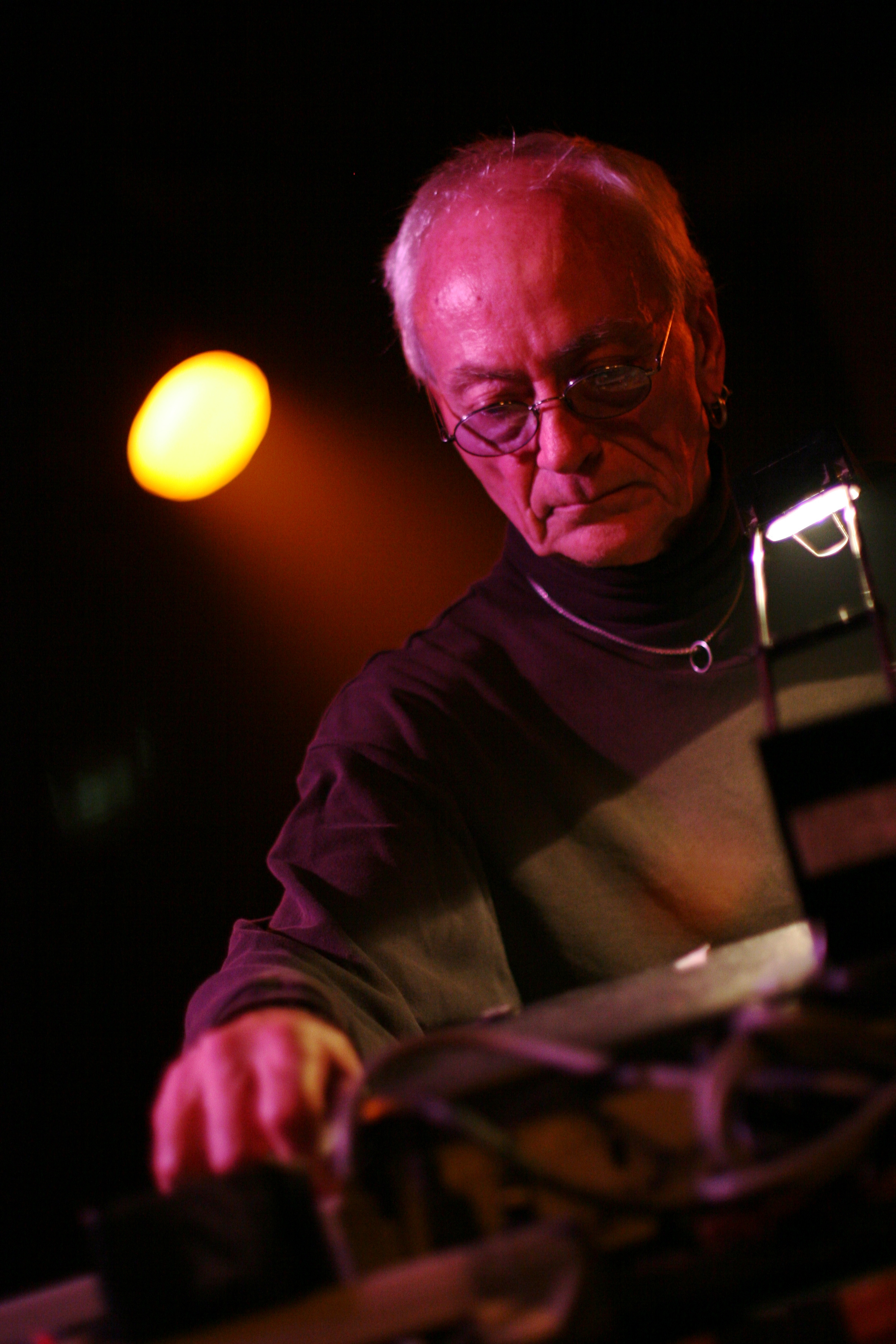
- Simeon Coxe of Silver Apples performing in Barcelona in 2008

Background information
- Origin: New York City, United States
- Genres: Psychedelia; electronic rock; underground rock
- Years active: 1967–1970, 1996–1999, 2006–2016
- Labels: Kapp; Rotorelief; MCA; Enraptured Records; Rocket Girl
- Past members: Simeon; Danny Taylor; Xian Hawkins; Michael Lerner
- Website: www.silverapples.com

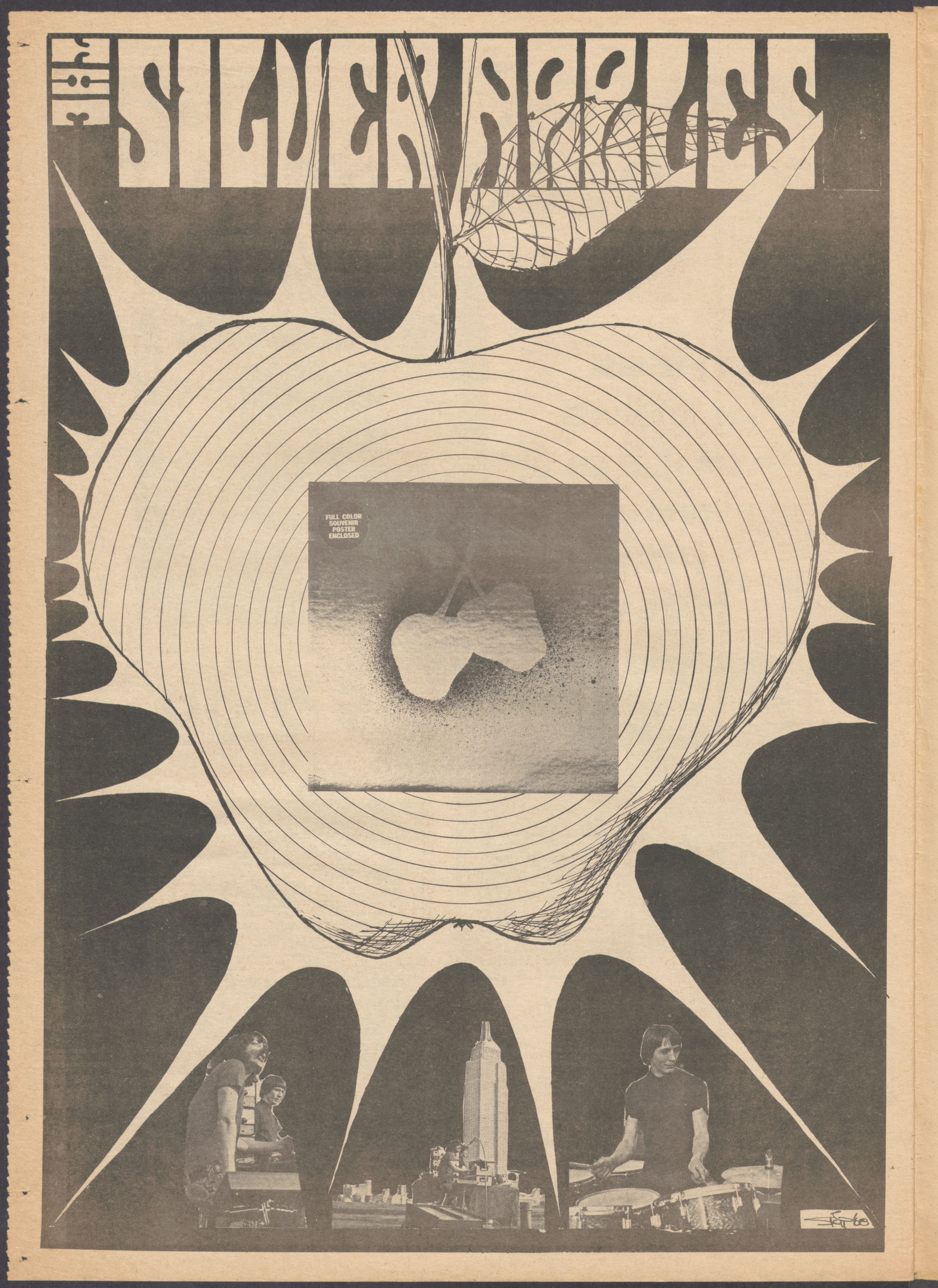
Ad for The Silver Apples album, 1968

Silver Apples were an American electronic rock group from New York, active between 1967 and 1970, before reforming in the mid-1990s. It was composed of Simeon (born Simeon Oliver Coxe III), who performed on a primitive synthesizer of his own devising; and, until his death in 2005, drummer Danny Taylor. The duo were among the first to employ electronic music techniques outside of academia, applying them to 1960s rock and pop styles. Their work would influence many subsequent artists, presaging acts such as Suicide, Spacemen 3, Stereolab, and Geoff Barrow.

As part of New York's underground music scene, the band released two albums—Silver Apples (1968) and Contact (1969)—to poor sales. They began recording a third album before a lawsuit by Pan Am, owing to the use of their logo in the artwork of Contact, forced the end of the group and its label Kapp in 1970. In the 1990s, German bootleg recordings of the band's albums raised their profile, and Simeon reformed the group with other musicians and released new music. In 1998, he reconnected with Taylor, and the two completed their original third LP The Garden (1998). After Taylor's death, Simeon continued releasing Silver Apples projects using samples of Taylor's drumming.

== History ==
=== The 1960s ===
The group formed out of a traditional rock band called The Overland Stage Electric Band, working regularly in the East Village. Simeon was the singer, but began to incorporate a 1940s vintage audio oscillator into the show, which alienated the other band members to the extent that the group was eventually reduced to the duo of Simeon and Taylor, at which point they renamed themselves The Silver Apples, after the William Butler Yeats poem "The Song of Wandering Aengus". The arsenal of oscillators eventually grew (according to their first LP liner notes) to include "nine audio oscillators piled on top of each other and eighty-six manual controls to control lead, rhythm and bass pulses with hands, feet and elbows". Simeon devised a system of telegraph keys and pedals to control tonality and chord changes, and reportedly never learned to play traditional piano-styled keyboards or synthesizers.

They were signed to Kapp Records and released their first record, Silver Apples, in 1968, and from that released a single, "Oscillations", a song that Simeon has cited as the first song he had written. On the debut album, seven of the nine songs had lyrics by Stanley Warren (not Warren Stanley as incorrectly credited on the re-release of the 1997 MCA CD), including the group's signature song "Oscillations". Warren, who subsequently became a published poet, met Simeon and Taylor at the Fifth Annual Avant Garde Arts Festival in 1967 in New York City, organized by Charlotte Moorman, who was famous as the "topless cellist". Soon after, Simeon became acquainted with Warren's early work, and set a poem, "MJ", to music as "Seagreen Serenades". Inspired by Simeon's interest, in the next few months Warren wrote the remaining six songs used on the Silver Apples album. Another song, "Gypsy Love", was used on the Silver Apples' second album, Contact. In latter-day performances, Simeon still played some of his and Warren's works from the early days of Silver Apples.

The following year, they released their second LP, Contact, and toured the United States. During the time of the recording of their second album, they shared a studio room with Jimi Hendrix. Both of them decided to jam together and recorded their version of the Star Spangled Banner for their special Fourth of July shows. The band had struck a deal with the airline Pan Am to shoot the front photo of the album's artwork in an airliner cockpit, in exchange for including the Pan Am logo. However, the backside of the record featured a photograph of a plane crash. This led to a lawsuit and the record was pulled from stores. A third album was recorded in 1970, but Kapp was folded into MCA Records, leaving the album unreleased, and the group disbanded.

=== 1990s revival ===
In 1994, the German label TRC released a bootleg CD of both records. In 1996 the British label Enraptured released a tribute album, Electronic Evocations - A Tribute To The Silver Apples, featuring American and British space rock revivalist bands including Windy & Carl, Flowchart, the Third Eye Foundation and Amp, among others. The interest provoked by this release prompted Simeon to reform the Silver Apples in 1996. The first two records were re-released as official records from the master tapes, and Simeon began a tour of the United States with a new Silver Apples band featuring Xian Hawkins (alias Sybarite) and Michael Lerner. In the ensuing years the Silver Apples released two albums of new material featuring this line-up: Decatur and Beacon. Eventually, "after much searching", Danny Taylor was located, and a handful of reunion shows of the original lineup were performed. Taylor also had the tape of the unreleased third record, The Garden, in a box in his attic, and the record was finally released in 1998, featuring completed tracks from the original sessions plus tracks of Taylor's drumming from the time mixed with Simeon's new additions. On July 5, 1998, Silver Apples played with Damon Albarn and Graham Coxon from Blur at the Meltdown Festival at the London Royal Festival Hall.

In 1998 their tour van was forced off the road by an unknown driver, breaking Simeon's neck. Plans for new recordings and further touring by the reunited duo were put on hold. As of 2004, Simeon was much recovered, but he was unable to play his instrument in the way he used to. Following the accident, Silver Apples' activity diminished. Simeon spent his time making new music, recuperating, and boating on the Gulf of Mexico. Xian Hawkins released four albums of solo material under the name Sybarite. Danny Taylor died on March 10, 2005, in Kingston, New York.

=== 2000s and 2010s concerts and festivals ===
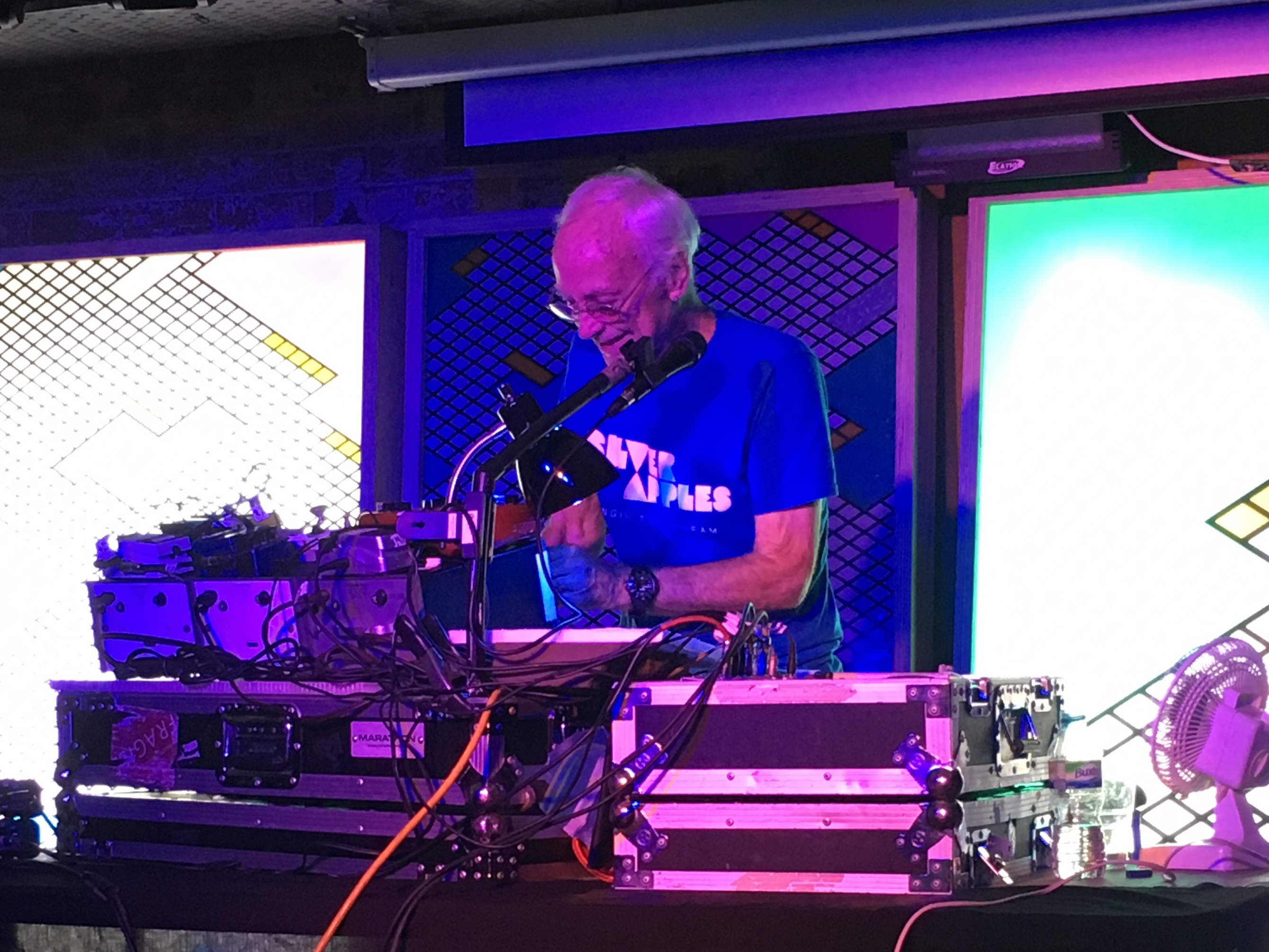
Silver Apples performing in Leeds in 2016

In September 2007 Simeon went on tour for the first time in years, performing as a solo version of the Silver Apples. Silver Apples / Simeon performed at, among others, All Tomorrow's Parties (Minehead, UK, December 2007); Electric Picnic, Stradbally, Ireland (September 2008); All Tomorrow's Parties, Australia (January 2009), The Unit, Tokyo, (July 2009); Oscillations Music + Arts Festival, Belfast, Northern Ireland (September 2009); Austin Psych Fest 3, TX (April 2010); Albuquerque Experimental, Albuquerque, NM (October 2010), Beijing, Shanghai and Guangzhou (May 2011), London, England iTunes Festival (July 2011), RecBeat festival, in Recife, Brazil (February 2012) and Incubate, Netherlands (September, 2012), Mountain Oasis Electronic Music Summit, Asheville, NC (October, 2013), Audioscope 14 in Oxford, UK (November 2014). Stereo Glasgow, UK (November 2014)

In October 2011, Simeon performed as Silver-Qluster, a collaboration with Cluster frontman Hans-Joachim Roedelius, in ATP I'll Be Your Mirror Festival in Asbury Park, NJ. On the same festival the following day, Simeon was invited onstage by Portishead to perform "We Carry On", Portishead's homage to Silver Apples.

Simeon toured the UK, Europe and the US in mid to late 2016. 2016 also marked the release of the first new Silver Apples studio album, Clinging To A Dream, in 19 years.

Simeon died on September 8, 2020, at the age of 82.

== Legacy and influence ==
Silver Apples are regarded as pioneers of electronic music, electronica, synth-pop, electro and electronic rock for their experimentation with electronic music in a rock/pop context and innovative work in melding psychedelic rock with home-made oscillators and synthesizers. Referring to this, AllMusic's Jason Ankeny described them as "a surreal, almost unprecedented duo".

John Lennon endorsed the group while appearing on a television broadcast in 1968, saying to "[w]atch out for a band called Silver Apples, they are the next thing." Alan Vega of Suicide listed Silver Apples as one of his core inspirations that led him to form the group in the early 1970s.

Groups and artists influenced by Silver Apples include bands from the first wave of post-rock such as Stereolab, Spiritualized, and Laika, as well as the bands and artists Radiohead, Portishead, Clinic, Beck, Moby and Beastie Boys. Portishead's Geoff Barrow stated that "for people like us, they are the perfect band [...] They should definitely be up there with the pioneers of electronic music"; the band's 2008 album Third was significantly inspired by their music.

"Lovefingers" is used in the 2024 film Civil War from A24 Films.

== Discography ==
Studio albums

- Silver Apples (1968)
- Contact (1969)
- Beacon (1997)
- The Garden (1998)
- Decatur (1998)
- A Lake of Teardrops (1999) (with Spectrum)
- Clinging to a Dream (2016)
- Mirage (2023) (with Makoto Kawabata)

Box set

- Silver Apples/Contact (1994)

Compilation albums

- Selections from the Early Sessions (2008)
- I Said No Doctors! (2017)

Remix albums

- Beacon Remixed (1998)
- Remixes (2000)

Live album

- iTunes Festival: London 2011 (2011)

Extended play

- Gremlins (2008)

Singles

- "Oscillations"/"Whirly-Bird" (1968)
- "You and I"/"Confusion" (1969)
- "Fractal Flow"/"Lovefingers" (1996)
- "I Don't Know" (2007) (split single with One Cut Kill)
