= Balanced-arm lamp =

Lamp with an adjustable balanced folding arm

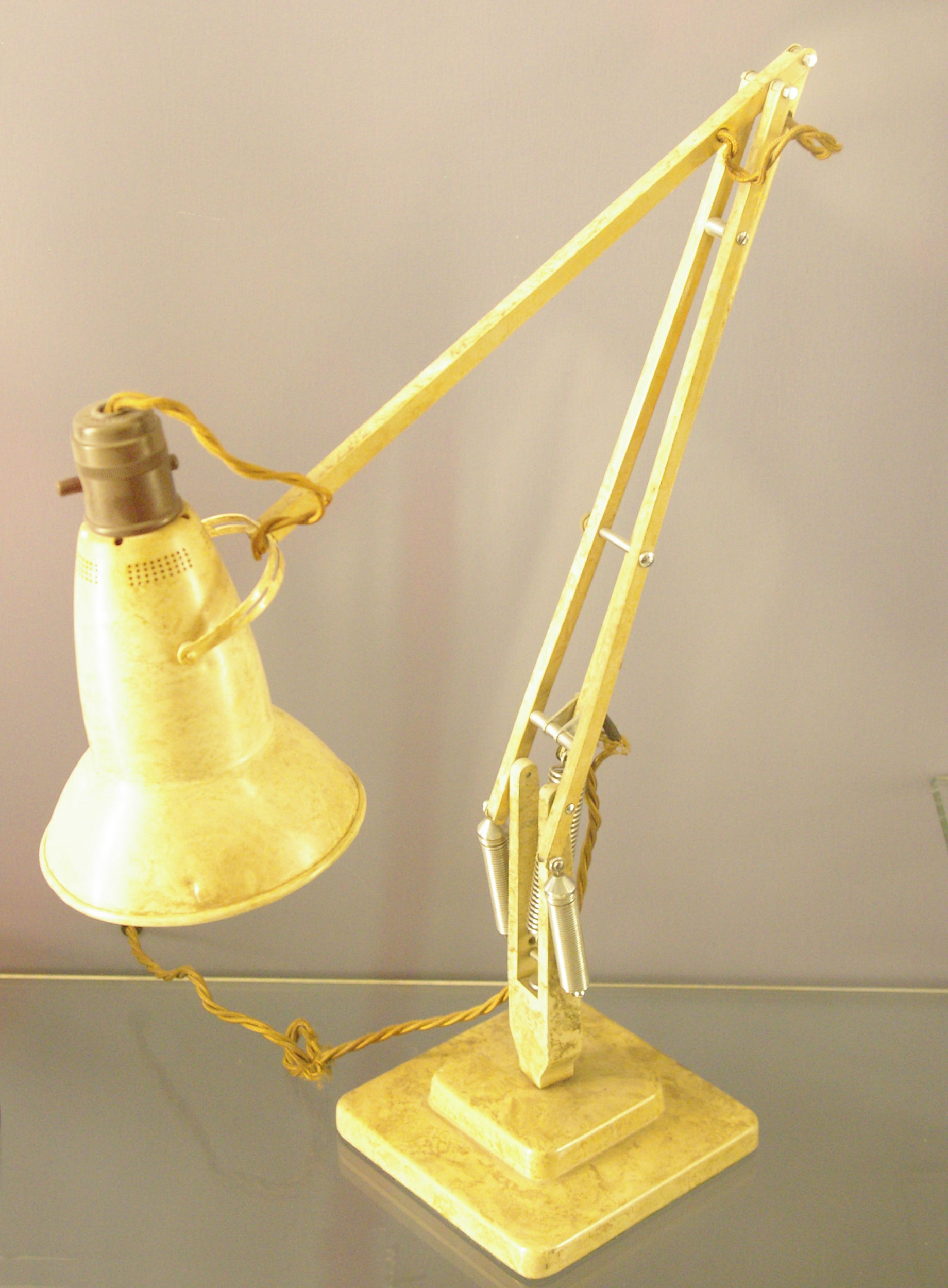
Anglepoise model 1227 from 1935

A balanced-arm lamp, sometimes called a floating arm lamp, is a lamp with an adjustable folding arm which is constructed such that the force due to gravity is always counteracted by springs, regardless of the position of the arms of the lamp. Many lamp brands (such as the Anglepoise, originator of the concept, and Luxo L-1), as well as other devices, use this principle.

== Configuration ==
=== The five terms ===
This article uses the terminology:

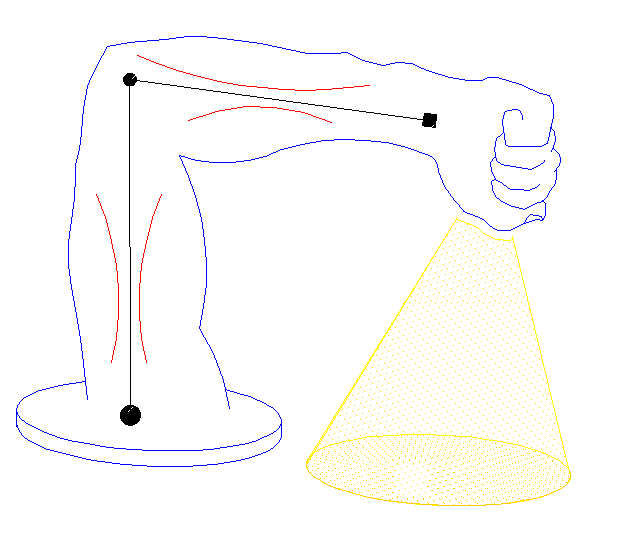

- lamp cap,
- forearm,
- upper arm,
- stand or body and
- base

for the five basic parts of these lamps.

=== The general design ===
A balanced-arm lamp has a base, a stand or body, (in most cases) two connected arms (in many cases fitted with springs), and a lamp-head.

The lamp can be moved into almost any position, and the balancing device will maintain the position until moved again.

The same overall mechanism can be employed in other devices with similar requirements, such as:

- copy holders for typists,
- microphone holders in studios or
- computer display holders.

For the physics and theory behind balanced-arm lamps, see Classical mechanics, linkage and torque.

There are different methods to balance the arms and the lamp-cap:

- coil springs
  In some cases a set of two coil springs working in parallel on both sides of the pivoting arm is used.
  (They function in the same way as a single spring.)
- counterweight(s)
  (a method frequently used in Sash windows and drawing boards).
- Friction between parts of the lamp arm,
- Coupling or
- hydraulics or pneumatic arms.

== Lamps balanced with springs ==
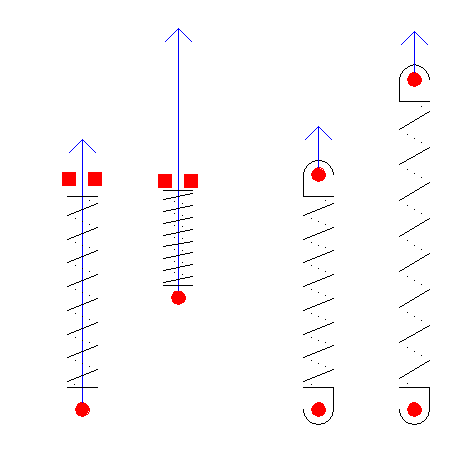
Compression and tension springs at rest and under load

There are many variations of construction with springs. Springs can be located on the mechanical equivalent of the forearm or the upper arm, or both, as well as nearer to the base. Some lamps use tension springs, and others use compression springs. The adjacent image shows (left to right) a compression spring at rest, then under load, followed by a tension spring at rest, and then under load. Springs have a limited lifting capacity and extension length. Some springs can resonate, producing low-level unwanted noise.

=== One tension spring ===
==== Spring-balanced upper arm, flexible forearm ====
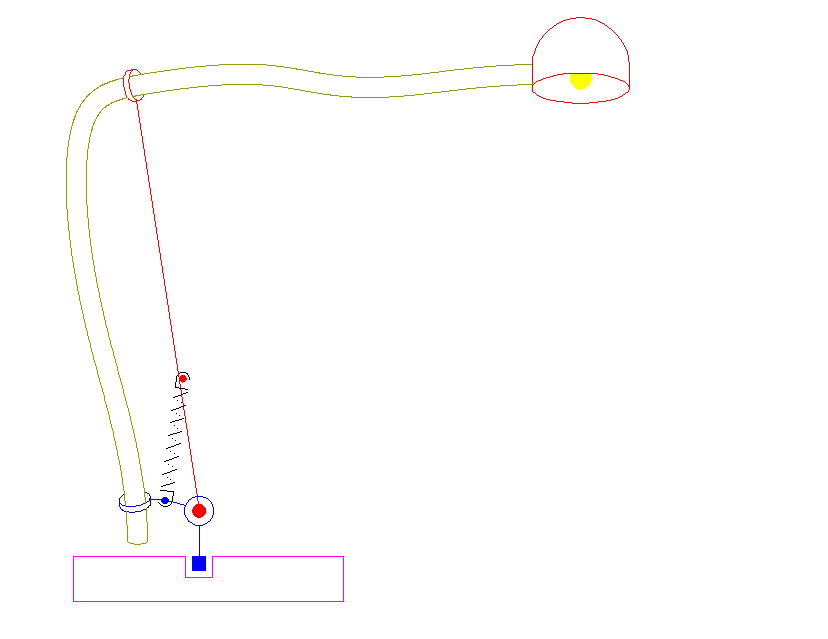
A flexible forearm

This lamp has a stiff flexible tube as its forearm, and a spring-balanced arm to support it near the middle. That way there is a flexible lamp with a long reach.

==== Tension spring over wheels ====
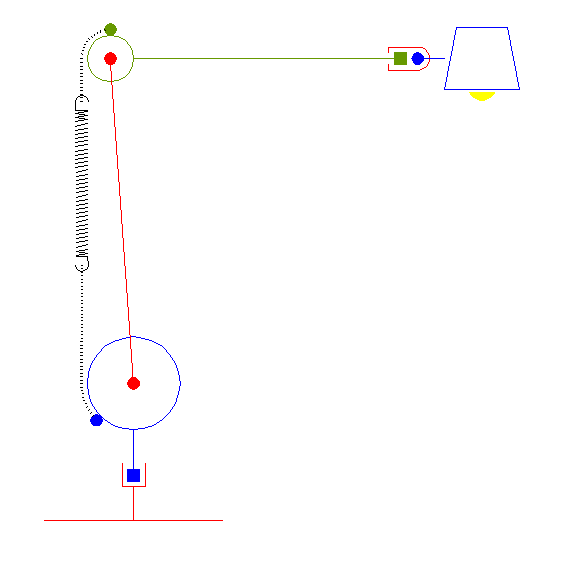
A spring over two wheels

The wheel to control the forearm is smaller than the wheel that controls the upper arm. The lamp cap rotates the same direction as the upper arm and forearm.

==== Two arms, one spring, one toothed wheel ====
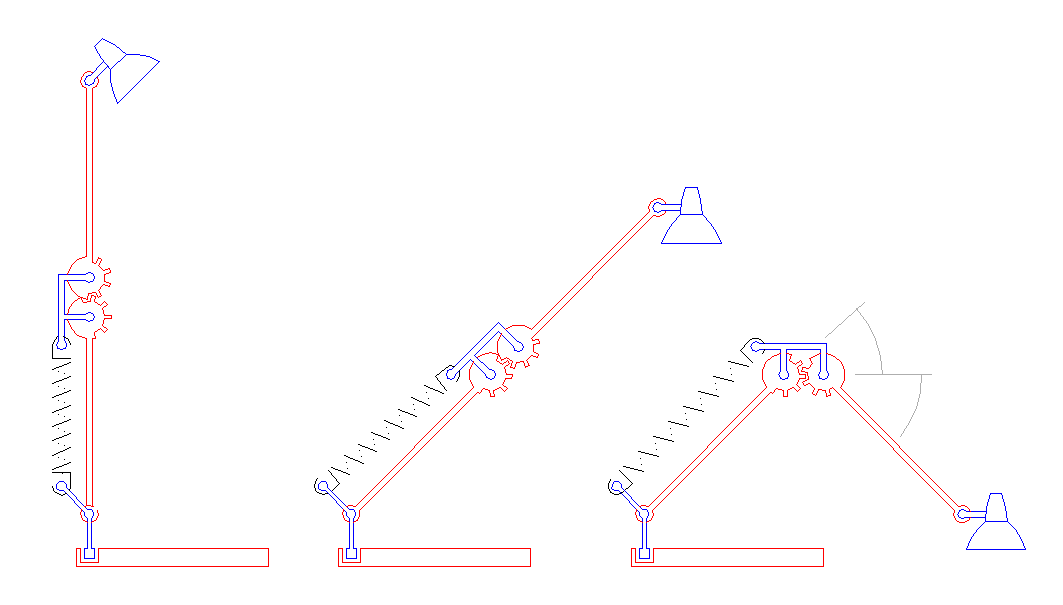
A single spring controlling upper arm and forearm

With this technique the tension spring has a double function: it controls both the forearm and the upper arm. This is not a common arm lamp system. The lamp cap rotates the same direction as the upper arm and forearm.

=== Two tension springs ===
==== Two parallelograms and two tension spring sets ====
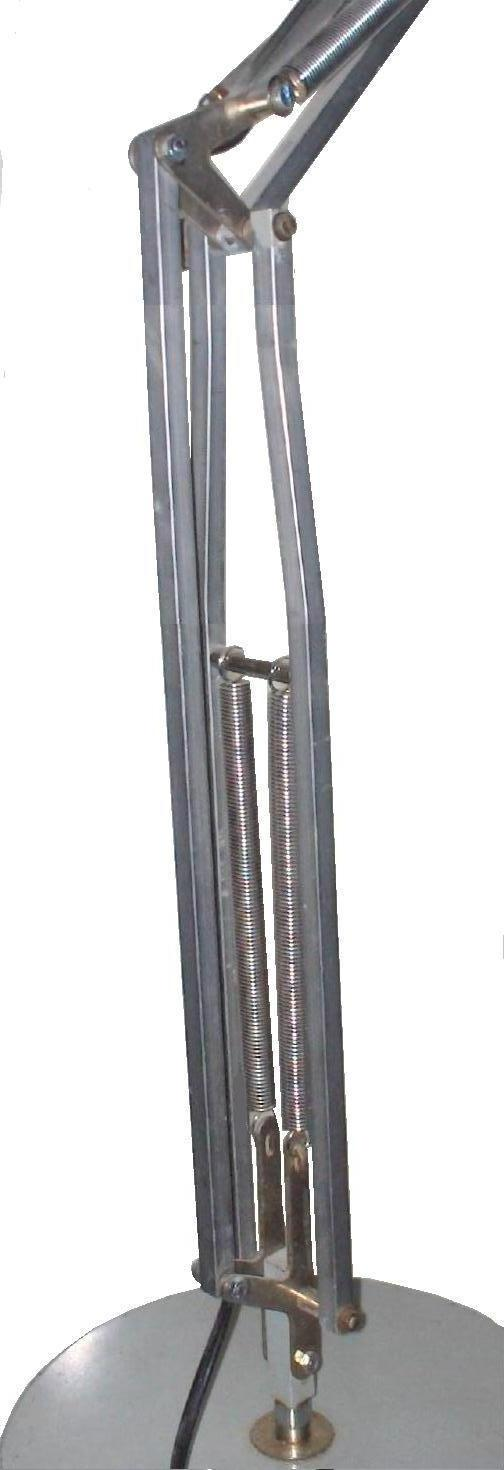
An upper arm showing three parallel bars

One tension spring set controls the forearm, which is a parallelogram having two bars. A stronger spring set controls the upper arm, which has three parallel bars (see photo, left). (There is a less stable construction with two parallel bars in the upper arm which is less expensive to manufacture.) Due to the parallel linkage of the lamp, the lamp cap keeps pointing in the same vertical direction when adjusting the height of the lamp. As with most balanced-arm lamps, the whole assembly can rotate in the horizontal plane, and is mounted on a stable foot.

==== One parallelogram and two extension spring sets ====
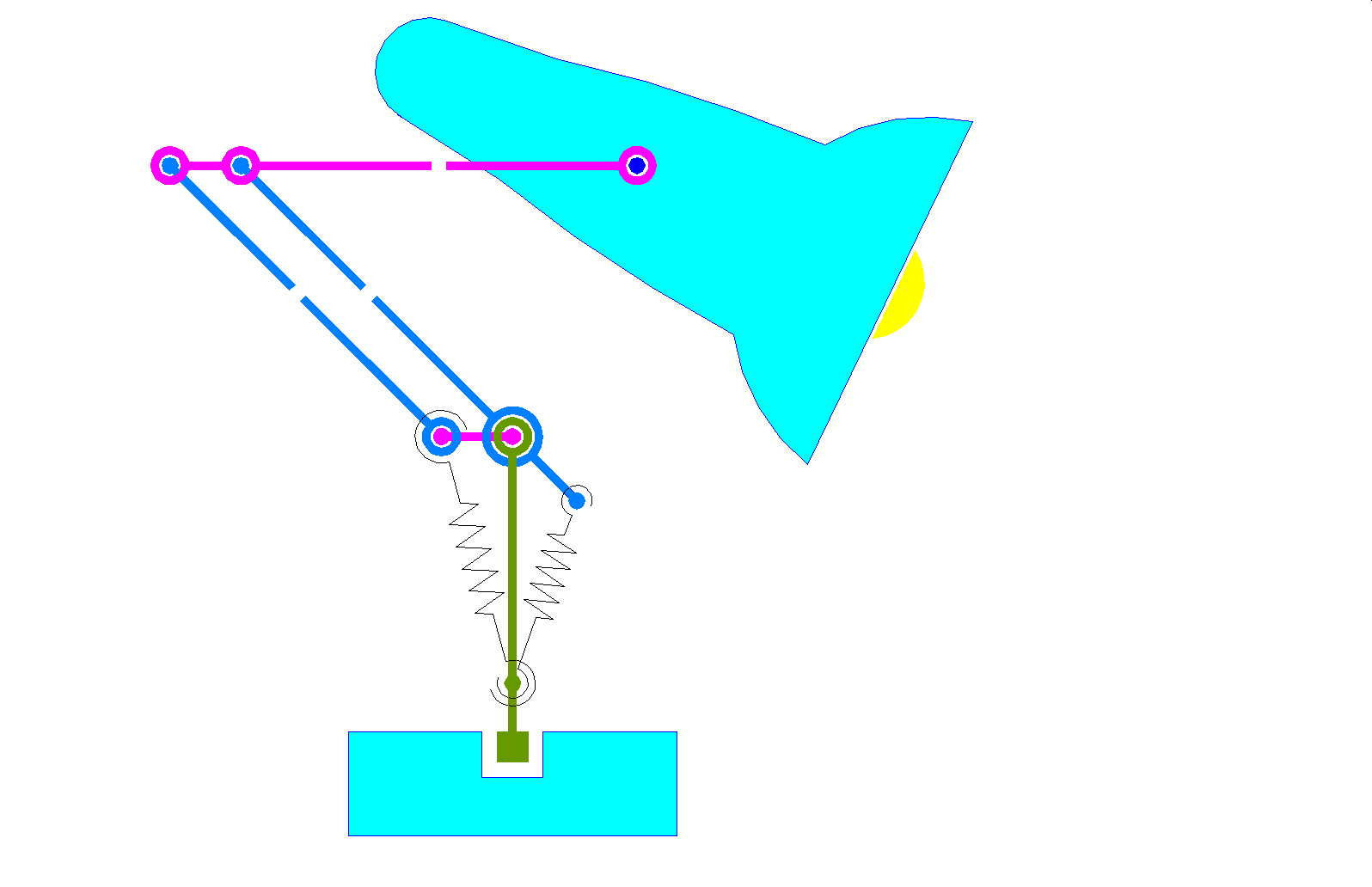
Anglepoise-style lamp

A lamp like the Anglepoise lamp has one parallelogram and two extension springs. One spring controls the shortest arm of a parallelogram. Parallel to this shortest arm there is the forearm. To keep these arms parallel there are two other parallel arms (upper arm) that are controlled by a second extension spring. The lamp cap rotates the same direction as the upper arm and forearm.

==== Single forearm bar, one parallelogram, two tension spring sets ====
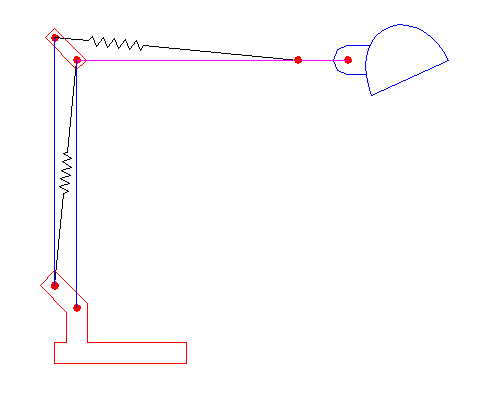
Diagram of a single-forearm lamp

The forearm of this lamp consist of a single bar. When it is adjusted, the angle of the lamp cap changes along with the arm.

==== Tension springs within the arms ====
Tension springs within the arms

A lamp like the Tolomeo desk lamp has no parallelograms in either arm. In this modern lamp the tension springs are hidden in the arms. The lamp cap rotates the same direction as the upper arm and forearm.

=== Compression springs ===
==== Compression springs in the arms ====
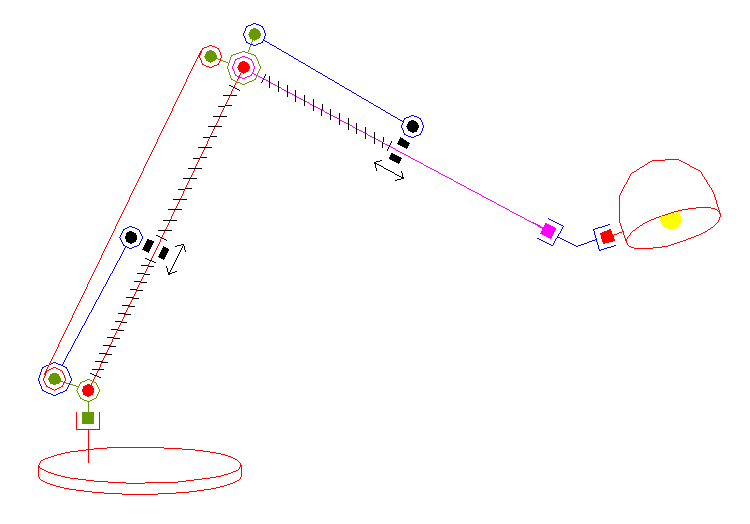
Compression springs in the arms

The short arms (green) stay parallel. One spring puts pull force on the blue arm. (If the blue arm is tilted back the second spring on this arm gets push force.) The blue arm controls the two parallel arms (red) that make up the upper arm. The other spring puts pull force on the other blue arm. This arm controls the forearm (magenta). The two springs can be the same size; one spring has to lift more weight but is more vertical. The other spring lifts less weight but is more horizontal.

==== Compression springs near the foot ====
Spring-balanced bending arm lamp

One compression spring controls a very short arm (grey). The Roller chain cable connects this arm parallel to the forearm (yellow). The longer spring controls the (blue) arm. The body (red) can turn in the horizontal plane. The body is connected to a stable foot. The body can be smaller because the pressure springs can protrude below the body.

==== A compression spring with one parallelogram ====
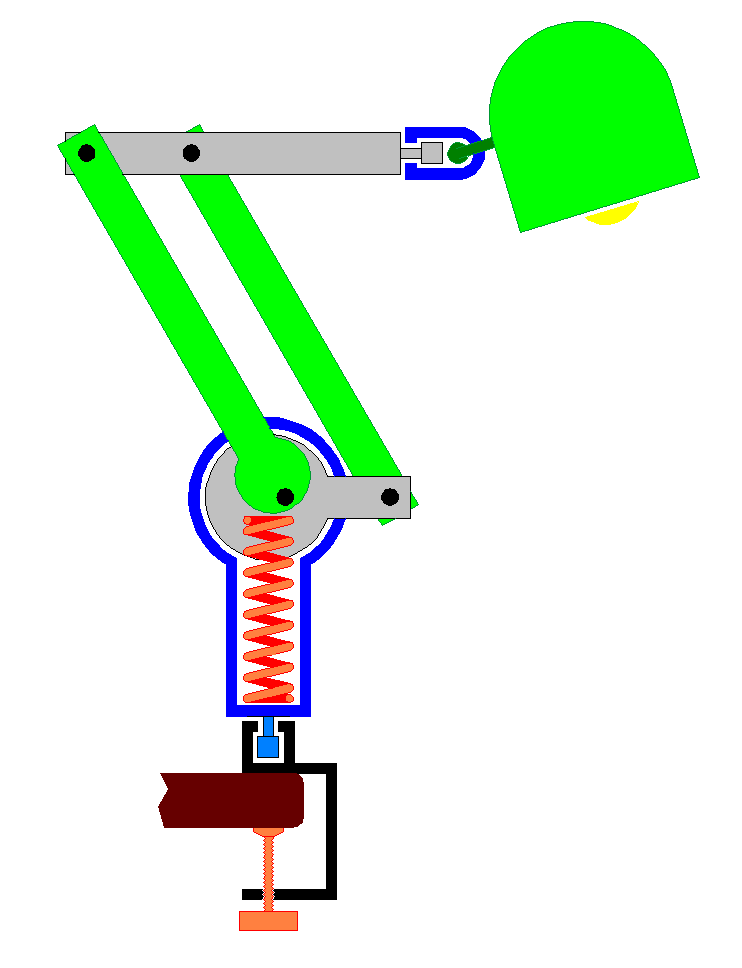
A compression spring with one parallelogram

In this method, just one compression spring controls a pantographic arm.

== Lamps balanced by pressure and friction ==
=== Rubber between two "parallel" arms ===
In this construction (commonly found in Italian lamps) gravity causes the parallelogram to deform such that the gap between the long arms becomes smaller. This in turn increases pressure on the rubber in the gap, and the resulting friction holds the arm in place.

Friction rubber arm

Squeezing rubber arm

The arms are balanced by pressure and friction

=== Friction from twisting ===
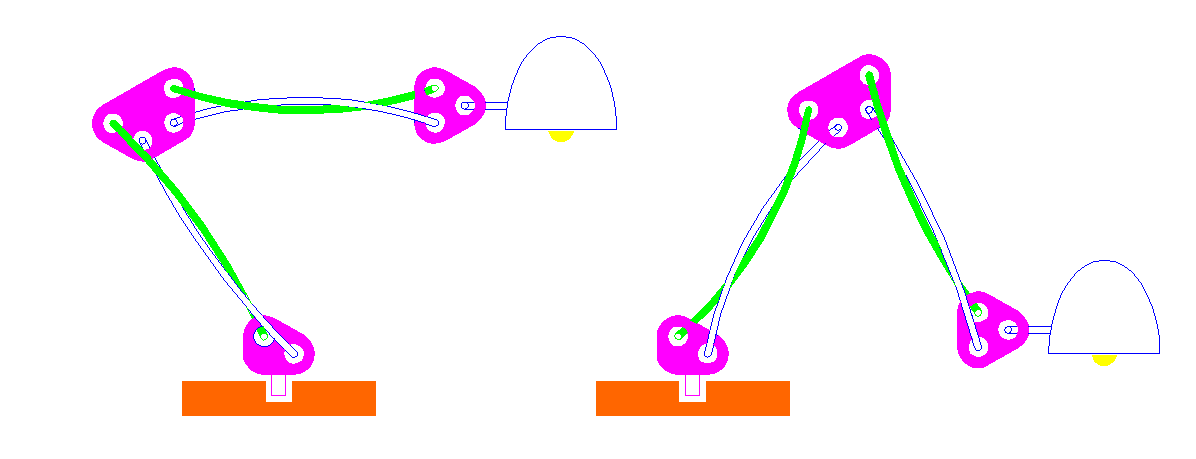
Lamp with flexible bars

The friction between the twisted arm controls the movement between the arms.

=== Friction between the upper arm and the forearm ===
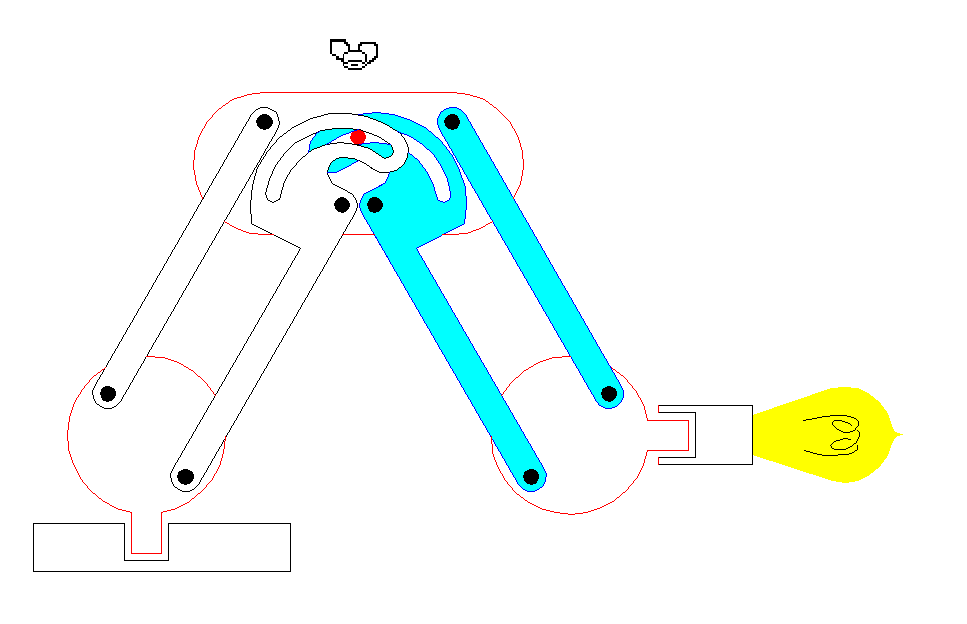
Another lamp with flexible bars

This arm system also works with friction.

== Lamps balanced with counterweight ==
=== Lamps balanced with one counterweight ===
Advantages of one swinging counterbalance is that the lamp can have a longer arm length.

Disadvantages are that the lamp is inherently less balanced, thus it needs a heavy stand to remain stable.

==== A single counterweight ====
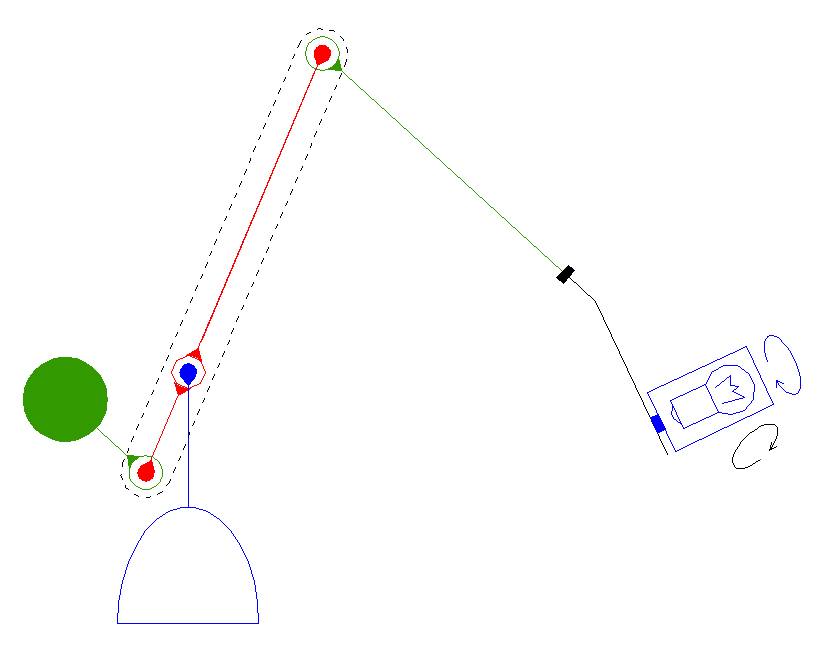
Single weight chain lamp

This construction uses a chain to keep the arm with the counterweight and the forearm parallel. The lamp-cap and counterweight move in opposite directions (both away from the base or both towards it). The balance that is required is shown by the following formula:

d_{1} = Lamp-cap to base; m_{1} = weight of lamp-cap

d_{2} = counterweight to base; m_{2} = weight of counterweight

m_{1} × d_{1} = m_{2} × d_{2}

==== One parallelogram with one counterweight ====
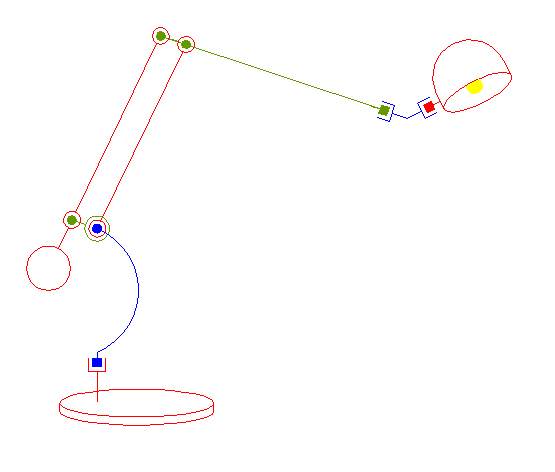
One parallelogram and one counterweight

This lamp has a heavy base, with a parallelogram pantograph construction formed by bars which are all hinged on each other. One long bar extends past the parallelogram construction and has a counterweight. One short bar also extends past the parallelogram construction and holds the lamp cap. The base has an arc formed stand so the counterweight does not hit the stand in vertical position.

==== One parallelogram with an extended counterweight ====

This lamp is similar to the one above, but as the counterweight has a low position the lamp needs no heavy foot for stability as the center of gravity is low. The counterbalance does not swing, but slides and rotates safely around the center of the stand.

==== Three parallelograms with one counterweight ====
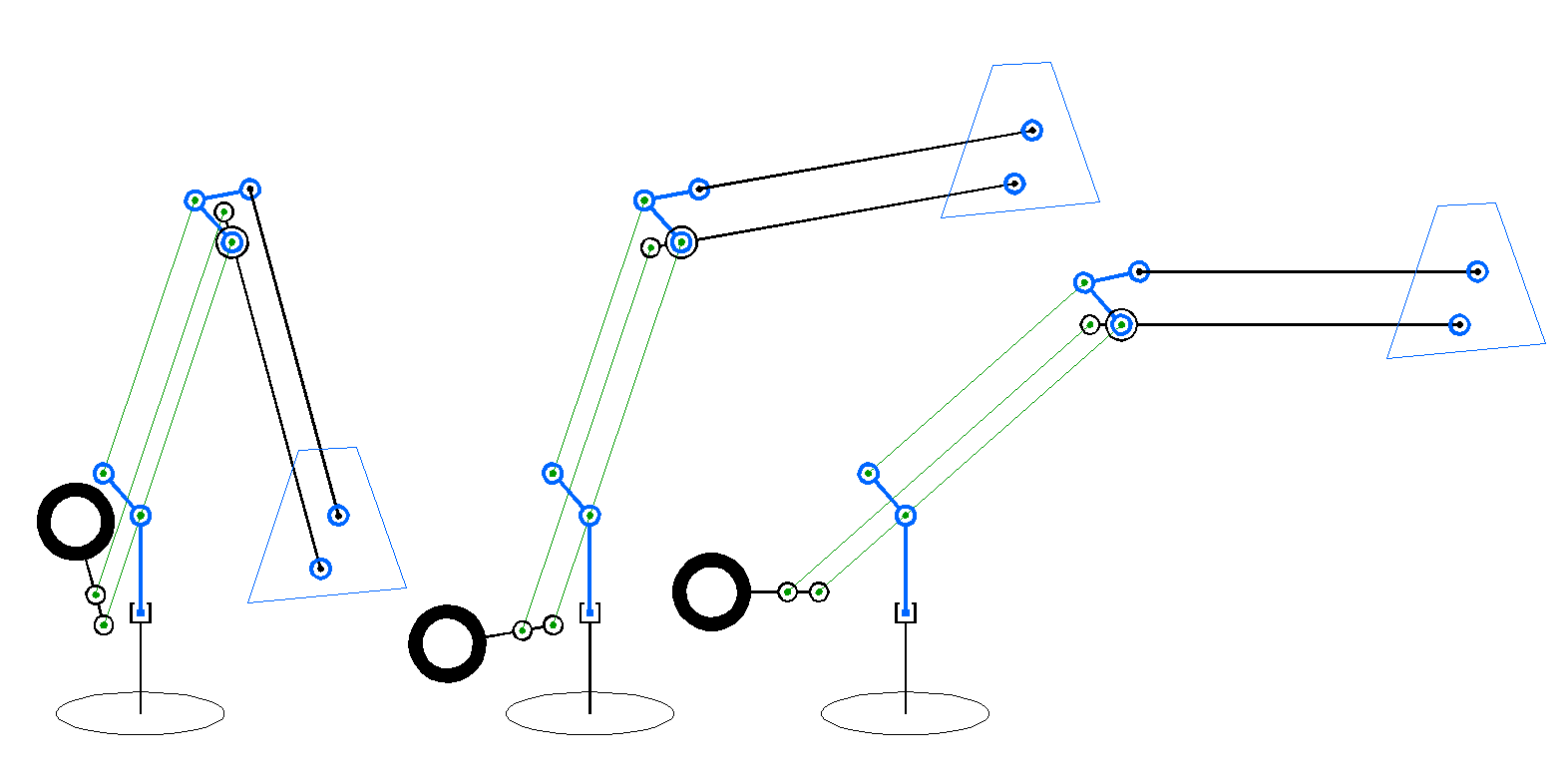

This lamp stand has a complex construction with matching narrow openings. This lamp is out of production.

=== Lamps balanced with two counterweights ===
==== A single arm with two counterweights ====
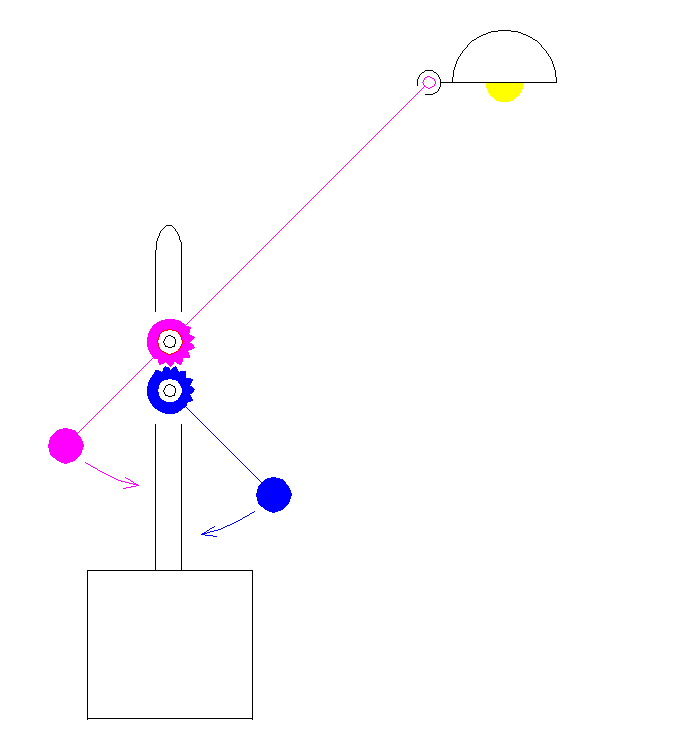

With this lamp the movement is very limited (the arm moves up and down only) but the technique is nice to look at. As the forearm becomes more horizontal the weight ceases to be balanced on both side of the base. The weight of the base is needed to avoid over-balancing.

==== Two arms with two counterweights ====
Dimension diagram

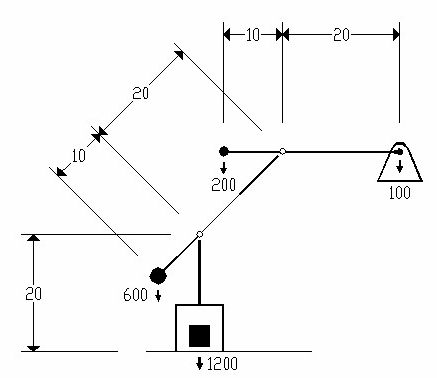
Outer position

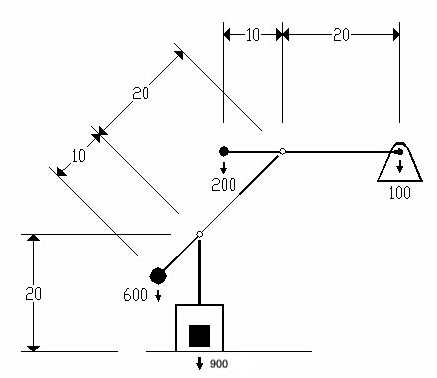
New Correct Diagram

Lamp with two arms and two counterweights

A lamp type like the Tizio works like this. A balancing arm (the forearm) has on one side of an axis a small counterweight and on the other side a lamp cap. These parts are lifted by a second bigger balancing arm (the upper arm) that has on the other side of a second axis a heavier counterweight. The lamp designed by Edouard-Wilfrid Buquet in 1927 works in this way. The lamp is in the collection of the Museum of Modern Art. The two axes have a different angle, and this has some advantages.

Lamp-cap x fore-Arm = Arm x Small weight (Lamp-cap + Small weight) x upper-arm = Arm x Big weight.

== Lamps using other systems ==
Here are some less common ways of balancing arms.

=== Lamps having a vertical axis ===
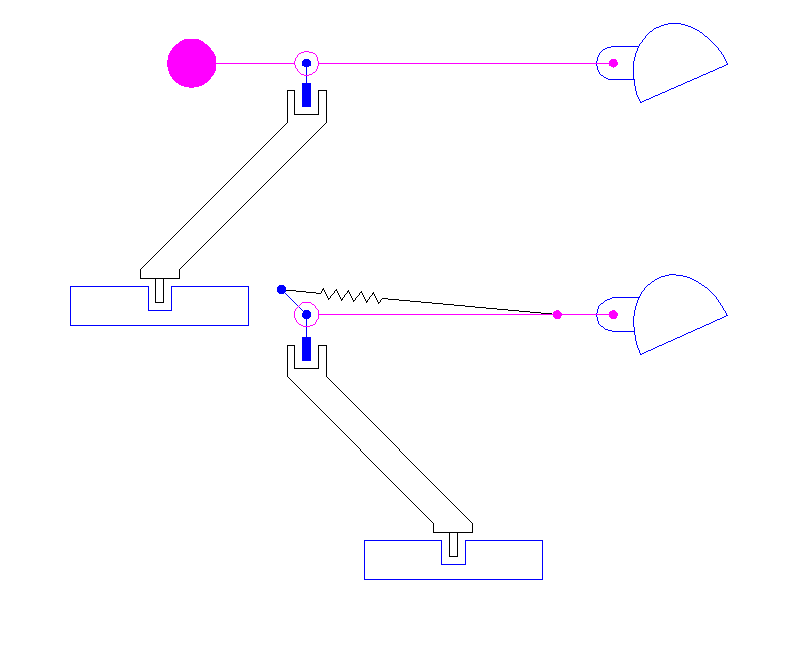
Lamps having a vertical axis

This kind of lamp has a forearm balanced by weight or springs. Its disadvantage is that the upper arm cannot point up or forwards.

=== Mechanical coupling devices ===
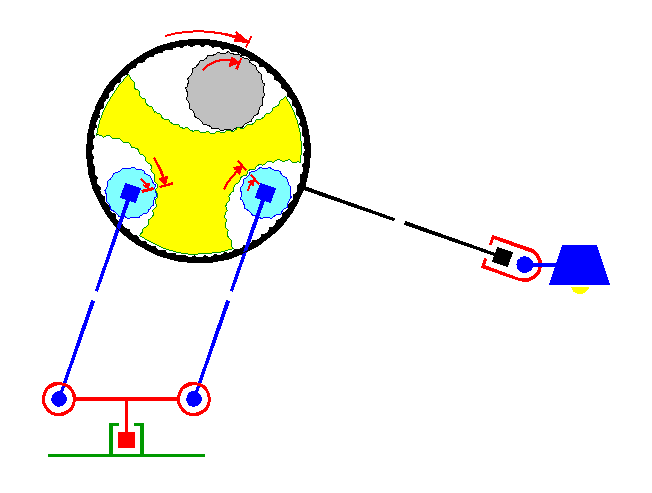
Mechanical locking jointlamp

This lamp works by coupling together the upper arm and the forearm. It is called a gravity-locked or cam-locked elbow.

=== Hydraulic arm ===
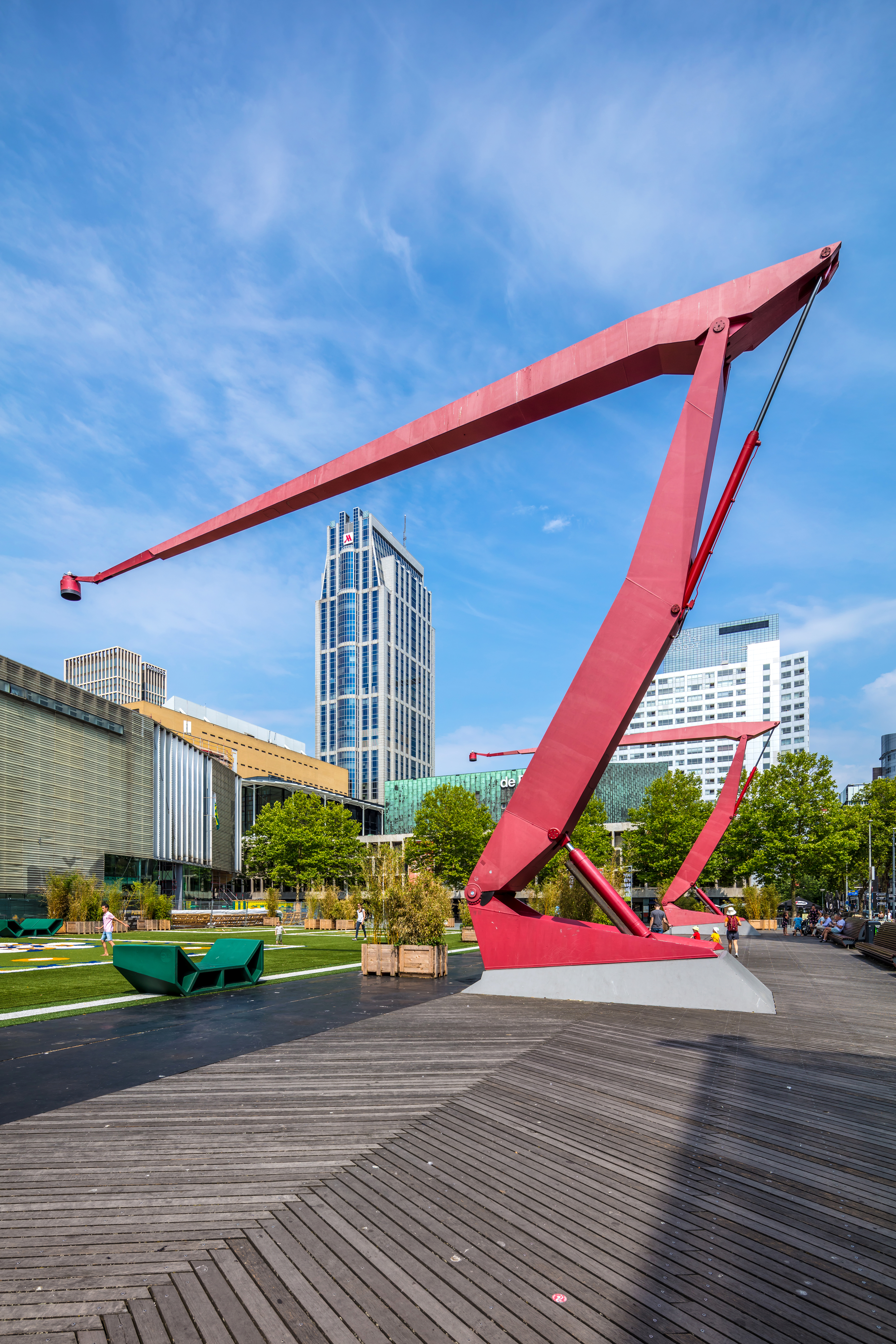
Moving streetlamps in Rotterdam

The pivoting arm streetlamps in the Schouwburgplein, Rotterdam use a pair of hydraulic cylinders to control the forearm and upper arm.

=== Pneumatic arm ===
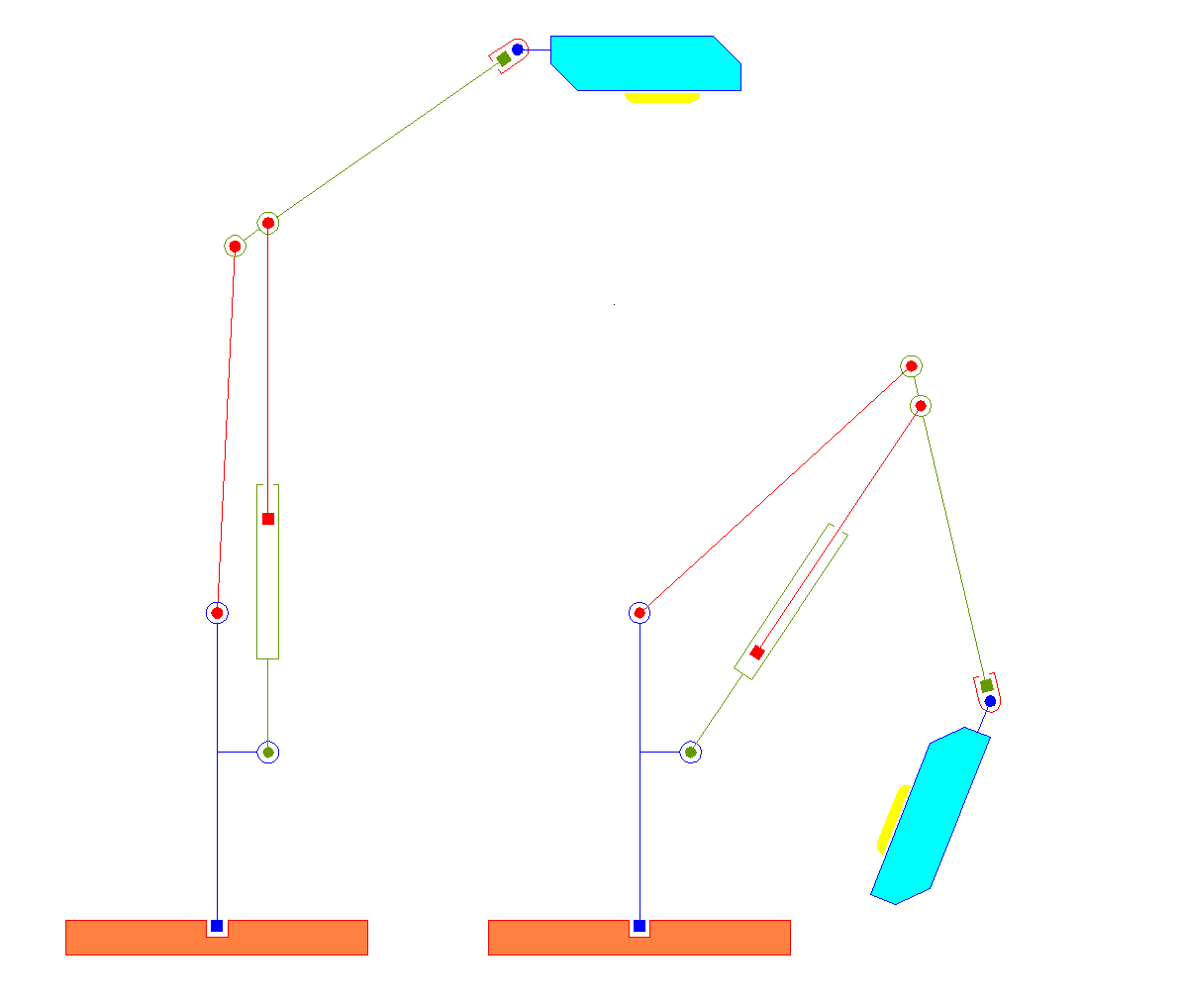

Arm lamp with a pneumatic cylinder. The gravity compress the air in the pneumatic cylinder.

== In popular culture ==
- Two spring-balanced desk lamps of this type feature as the main characters in the 1986 Pixar short film Luxo Jr.. It also serves as the letter I in the Pixar logo presented before and at the end of each of their films.
- Myster Shadow-Sky is the only composer who from 1980 to 2007 performed the balanced-arm lamp as a musical instrument: the archisonic lamp. In 1980 he wrote the score "Ludus Musicae Temporarium" for a balanced arm lamp orchestra. The world premiere was performed by Les Percussions de Strasbourg at the Manca contemporary music festival in Nice in 1988. He released five albums with a four spring balanced arm lamp musical instrument (and more with other musical instruments). They are available for free download. Referenced in the book "Les chercheurs de sons" (2004), as the unique creator of a balanced arm lamp as a musical instrument.

== See also ==
- Engineering science and mechanics
- Gooseneck lamp
- Industrial design
- Light fixture
- Mechanical advantage
- Mechanical engineering technology
- Moment (physics)
- Torsion spring

== Patents history ==
Classifications IPC: F21V21/26

International patent category: B23B31/171

- GB191104491 An Improved Device for Supporting or Suspending Electric Lamps and the like (1911)
- U.S. patent 1,370,231 - 1921 harmonica arm
- GB206435 1923 parallelogram & counter weight
- GB254972 1926 friction
- GB285045 1929 2 counter weight
- GB481198 1934 spring and counter weight
- FR757890 1934 CARWARDINE GEORGE
- FR784932 1935 CARWARDINE GEORGE
- GB470502 1937 friction
- GB489547 1938 2 parallelogram 2 springs
- GB504791 1939 2 pressure springs
- GB536342 19.. a-symmetric arm-lamp
- GB589994 1947 friction and a spring
- GB618344 1949
- GB629364 1949 spring in the arm
- GB713378 1954 friction arm
- U.S. patent 3003737A11961 1961
- GB1249774A 1971
- U.S. patent 5333103A1 1991
- EP0518569 1992
- EP1274545 2003 mechanical coupling devices
