= Happiness (Fridge album) =

Studio album by Fridge
- Released: 24 September 2001
- Genres: Post-rock, downtempo, experimental techno
- Length: 59:27
- Label: Text Records
- Producer: Fridge

Fridge chronology
Eph (1999)	Happiness (2001)	The Sun (2007)

Professional ratings
Review scores
Source	Rating
Allmusic	2.5/5 stars
Pitchfork	7.7/10

Happiness is the fourth studio album by the English instrumental post-rock band Fridge. It was released in 2001 on Text Records. According to AllMusic, the album's highlights are "Cut Up Piano and Xylophone" described as a "soft, gauzy piece reminiscent of '70s minimalism", and "Five Four Child Voice".

It was re-released in April 2023 on vinyl, having been "restored, reconstructed, and remastered" by Fridge guitarist Kieran Hebden (aka Four Tet).

== Track listing ==
1. "Melodica and Trombone"
2. "Drum Machines and Glockenspiel"
3. "Cut Up Piano and Xylophone"
4. "Tone Guitar and Drum Noise"
5. "Five Four Child Voice"
6. "Sample and Clicks"
7. "Drums Bass Sonics and Edits"
8. "Harmonics"
9. "Long Singing"
10. "Surface Noise and Electric Piano" [Japanese version only]
11. "Five Combs" [Japanese version and Reissue only]
