= Eph (album) =

Studio album by Fridge
- Released: 14 June 1999
- Genre: Post-rock, ambient techno
- Label: Go! Beat

Fridge chronology
Semaphore (1998)	Eph (1999)	Happiness (2001)

Eph Reissue
- Reissued in 2002 on Brainwashed Recordings/Temporary Residence Limited

Professional ratings
Review scores
Source	Rating
Allmusic	4/5 stars
Q	4/5 stars

Eph is the third studio album by the English post-rock band Fridge. It was released in 1999, as their first (and only) album for the Go! Beat label.

The album was reissued in North America in 2002 on Temporary Residence Limited with an additional CD consisting of two EPs released in the same year ("Kinoshita Terasaka" and remixes of "Of" by the band themselves), plus two more recent remixes.

== Track listing ==
=== Original and CD1 of Eph Reissue ===
1. "Ark"
2. "Meum"
3. "Transience"
4. "Of"
5. "Tuum"
6. "Bad Ischl"
7. "Yttrium"
8. "Aphelion"

=== CD2 of Eph Reissue ===
1. "Kinoshita"
2. "Terasaka"
3. "Of (Version)"
4. "Of (Remix)"
5. "Of (Edit)"
6. "Of (Dub)"
7. "Ark (Herberts Fully Flooded Mix)"
8. "Bad Ischl (Patrick Pulsinger Mix)"
