= Fridge (band) =

English post-rock band

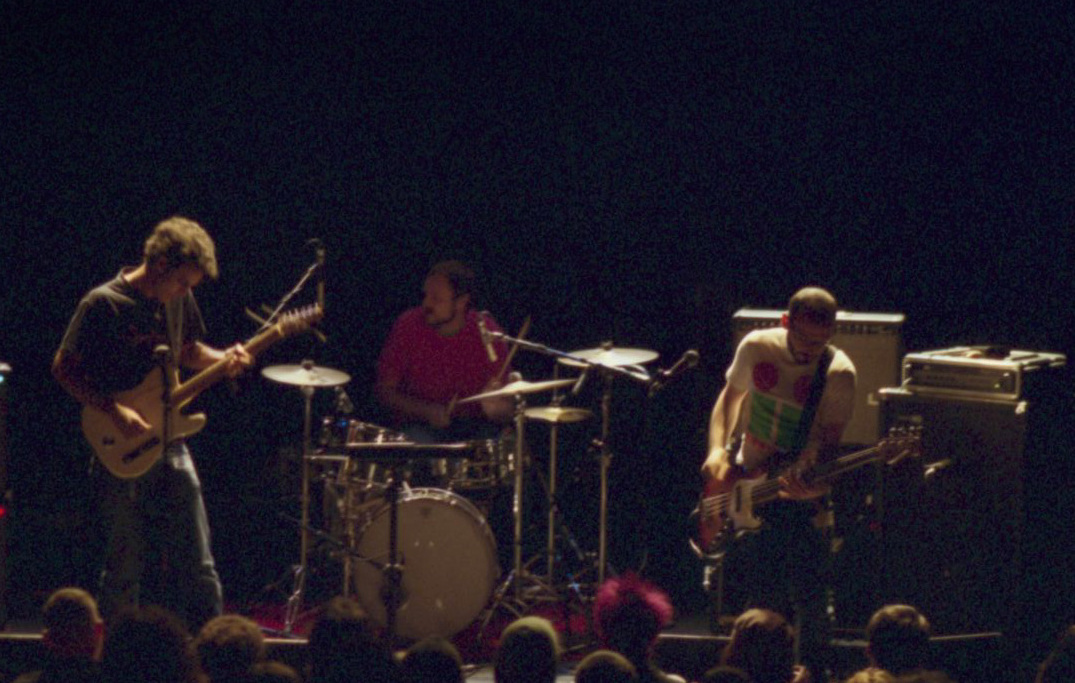
- Fridge live in 2007. Left to right: Hebden, Jeffers, Ilhan

Background information
- Origin: Putney, London, UK
- Genres: Post-rock
- Years active: 1995–2001, 2007
- Labels: Output; Go! Beat; Text; Domino
- Spinoffs: Adem; Four Tet
- Members: Kieran Hebden; Adem Ilhan; Sam Jeffers
- Website: www.brainwashed.com/fridge

Fridge was an English instrumental post-rock band formed in 1995 by school friends Kieran Hebden (guitar, samples), Adem Ilhan (bass) and Sam Jeffers (drums). Their rhythm heavy sound was influenced by krautrock bands such as Can and Neu!, while critics view their early works as following similar paths as the contemporary post-rock groups Tortoise and Do Make Say Think. Over time Hebden's interest in techno and drum and bass became predominant, supported by Jeffers' complex drum patterns.

They released four critically acclaimed but commercially unsuccessful albums between 1995 and 2001, of which the last, Happiness, is generally seen as their high point. Their 2007 double album The Sun was released after a long period of inactivity, after Hebden had begun a solo career and Ilhan and Jeffers enrolled in college.

Fridge never officially split up, although their last live performance was in 2007. Hebden and Ilhan record as Four Tet and Adem respectively.

== History ==
=== Career ===
Hebden, Ilhan and Jeffers met in the mid-1990s at Elliott School in Putney, southwest London, where they became friends with contemporaries William Bevan (Burial), Hot Chip and The xx; all of whom members of Fridge have worked with. Recalling the period, Joe Goddard of Hot Chip recalled that "there was a spirit: if you want to do something just go and fucking do it. You didn’t need permission." Hebden remembers being allowed to "rehearse with my band at lunch and for hours after school without any interference. When I was at school, drum 'n' bass happened. Our teachers would let us set up big sound systems and have drum'n'bass parties during lunchtime breaks….we’d be in a drama room with machines and strobe lights for half an hour, dancing to DJ Zinc's "Super Sharp Shooter" or something blasting out at huge volume."

Their sound progressed from post-rock to electronica over their career, while retaining a focus on complex rhythms. Initially, Hebden played guitar, Ilhan bass guitar, and Jeffers drums, but Hebden and Ilhan adopted a variety of other instruments. Of their early work, Hebden said that they were "trying to make music that didn't sound like anything else; all of us not quite skilled enough to translate the sound in our head onto cassette, but creatively filling the gaps, using them and making them integral."

By 1999's Eph, the sampler was playing an increasingly important role in their music. According to Pitchfork, it contains the "building blocks of their initial sample dabbling ... creeping stealthily in and out of songs such as 'Helicopter' and the thorny assault of distortion on 'Cassette'." They occasionally backed Badly Drawn Boy as his live band around this time, and in 2000 remixed his single Another Pearl. Their following album, 2001's Happiness, was idely regarded by critics as their best to date. It was retrospectively described by AllMusic as "slightly more difficult [than Eph and containing] many excellent moments; 'Cut Up Piano and Xylophone' is a soft, gauzy piece reminiscent of '70s minimalism and 'Five Four Child Voice' a precocious time-signature jam."

Their final album The Sun was released in June 2007 after a six-year hiatus. It has received critical acclaim by magazines such as Spin and Drowned in Sound.

=== Inactivity and solo work ===
Although inactive since 2007, Fridge have never officially split up. In August 2007 they played their first gig after six years at Bardens Boudoir in Dalston, London, followed by a performance that year at the Field Day festival in East London's Victoria Park. Hebden's solo career as Four Tet dates from the late 1990s, and he also releases music as "Kieran Hebden," "KH," and "00110100 01010100." Ilhan releases solo albums under the name Adem.

The 21-track compilation album Early Output 1996–1998 was released in 2009. In April 2023 their album Happiness was re-released on vinyl for its 20th anniversary, having been "restored, reconstructed, and remastered".

== Discography ==
=== Albums ===
- Ceefax, Output Recordings, 1997
- Semaphore, Output Recordings, 1998
- Eph, Go! Beat Records, 1999; reissued in 2002 with a bonus disc containing the combined material from Kinoshita Terasaka and Of EPs
- Happiness, Text Records, 2001
- The Sun, Text Records (UK), Temporary Residence Limited (US), 2007

=== Compilation albums ===
- Sevens and Twelves, Output Recordings, 1998
  - Two-CD compilation of all the singles and EPs recorded for Output (Lojen, Anglepoised, Lign and Orko), previously released only on vinyl
- Early Output 1996–1998, Temporary Residence, 2009

=== EPs and singles ===
- "Lojen", Output Recordings, 1997
- Anglepoised, Output Recordings, 1997
- Lign, Output Recordings, 1998
- Orko, Output Recordings, 1998
- Kinoshita Terasaka, Go! Beat Records, 1999
- Of Go!, Beat Records, 1999

=== Compilation appearances ===
- Brain in the Wire, various artists
- Thank You, various artists, Temporary Residence Limited, 2004
- Destroy Independent Music!, various artists, Temporary Residence Limited sampler, 2006–2007
