= Sybarite (musician) =

American electronic musician

Sybarite is the solo project of musician Christian "Xian" Hawkins, who played with the Silver Apples for a number of years in the 1990s. Sybarite produces abstract midtempo electronica, but also contains elements of jazz and classical music. He has released albums on the 4AD label among others. As of 2015, Sybarite is now featured on the Temporary Residence Ltd. label.

The Sybarite track "Runaway" was featured on the Grey's Anatomy TV series episode "Wishin' and Hopin'".

== Discography ==
=== Singles and EPs ===
- "Meusic" (Emanate, 1999)
- "Otonomy" (Static Caravan, 2000)
- "Engaged"/"Without Nothing I'm You" (ZEAL, 2001)
- "Scene of the Crime" (4AD, 2002)

=== Albums ===
- Placement Issues (Temporary Residence, 2001)
- Nonument (4AD, 2002)
- Musicforafilm (Temporary Residence, 2004)
- Cut Out Shape (Temporary Residence, 2006)
- Waver the Absolute (Temporary Residence, 2016)
