= Output Recordings =

- Founded: 1996
- Founder: Trevor Jackson
- Status: Defunct
- Genre: Electroclash, post-rock, post-punk, dance-punk, acid house, electronica
- Country of origin: United Kingdom
- Official website: http://outputrecordings.com/

Output Recordings was a British independent record label run by Trevor Jackson, between 1996 and 2006. Output released 100 records over the ten-year period, and several bands first appeared on this label, including Fridge, Lisa Germano, Four Tet, Black Strobe, Colder, LCD Soundsystem, and Jackson's own Playgroup.

Output Recordings also exclusively released, marketed and distributed initial releases from DFA Records worldwide excluding the US and Japan. Including The Rapture & LCD Soundsystem.
