= Rounds (album) =

2003 album by Four Tet

Studio album by Four Tet
- Released: 5 May 2003
- Genres: Electronica; folktronica; IDM; downtempo; EDM
- Length: 45:22
- Label: Domino
- Producer: Kieran Hebden

Four Tet chronology
Paws (2001)	Rounds (2003)	Hella/Four Tet Split (2004)

Singles from Rounds
- 1. "She Moves She" Released: 31 March 2003; 2. "As Serious as Your Life" Released: 20 October 2003; 3. "My Angel Rocks Back and Forth" Released: 4 May 2004

Rounds is the third solo album by the British electronic musician Kieran Hebden, released under his alias Four Tet on 5 May 2003 by Domino Recording Company. Wanting to make a more personal record, Hebden recorded and produced the album in his North London flat over ten months using a desktop computer and a home hi-fi system. Its ten tracks feature elements of hip-hop, jazz and folk. Apart from a guitar part recorded for "Slow Jam", the music is composed of between 200 and 300 samples, many processed beyond recognition.

Rounds produced two singles and one EP. Critics praised its unique fusion of electronic and organic styles, and Metacritic lists it as the fourth best-reviewed album of 2003. Several publications included Rounds on "best albums of the decade" lists. In May 2013, on the tenth anniversary of its release, Domino reissued Rounds with a bonus disc including a 2004 live performance.

== Background and recording ==
After being a member of Fridge since 1995, Kieran Hebden began releasing solo records under the name Four Tet in 1998. His first release was the "Thirtysixtwentyfive" single, followed by the albums Dialogue in 1999 and Pause in 2001. The albums were influenced by hip-hop, jazz and electronic music. Hebden felt his output had sounded too much like his influences and wanted to make a record that was more personal and harder to define. He drew on influences including hip-hop producers Pete Rock and DJ Premier, R&B producers Timbaland, the Neptunes and Rodney Jerkins, and the American musician Jim O'Rourke.

Hebden recorded Rounds over ten months in his North London flat, using a desktop computer and a home hi-fi system. With the exception of a guitar part recorded for "Slow Jam", he composed the music exclusively from a file of samples he had assembled over several years. The album uses between 200 and 300 samples; each song is built from between 20 and 30 samples heavily processed with the software packages AudioMulch and Cool Edit Pro, in many cases beyond recognition. The nine-minute track "Unspoken" was originally based on a sample from the Tori Amos song "Winter" but was reworked when Hebden failed to get sample clearance. Hebden also used a Creative Labs microphone to record the guitar part for "Slow Jam" and some sounds from television and sequenced the results in Cakewalk Pro Audio 9.

After spending the early part of his career naming his songs with random words, Hebden decided to use more meaningful titles. "As Serious as Your Life" takes its name from a 1977 Val Wilmer book about free jazz in New York City. Hebden was given a copy of the book by his father and said: "I did hope that some kid would get interested and ask what the title was and then check out the book, so it's a bit like leaving little trails for people." He was inspired to title the album Rounds after hearing that his sister had been singing a musical round, telling an interviewer: "It seemed totally relevant; a round is all about repetition and phasing, which is the essence of what I've been doing since I've been making music."

== Music ==
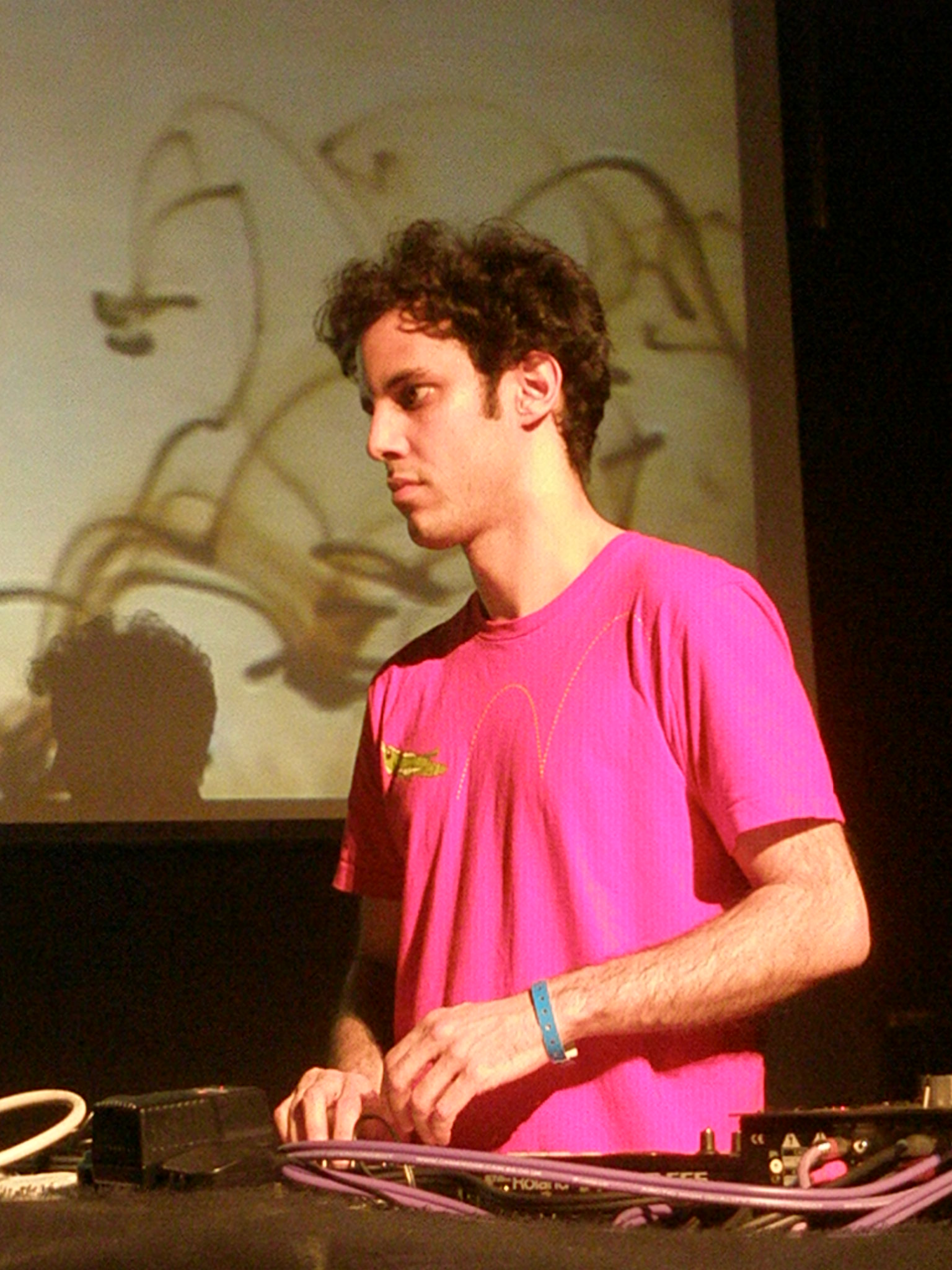
Kieran Hebden produced Rounds almost entirely from heavily processed samples.

Rounds contains ten instrumental tracks with a total running time of 45 minutes, which Colin Joyce of Spin called a "folktronica tapestry". Clash noted that Four Tet helped pioneer the folktronica genre with Pause and Rounds. Sound on Sound writer Sam Inglis said that the album was a "blend of fragile acoustic fragments, brutal beats and glitchy electronica"; The Age described it as "electronic music that sounds deceptively organic." Guardian critic David Peschek, who noted the influence of hip-hop, R&B and folk music, wrote that "Rounds invents its own dizzying, unlikely genres." Pitchfork's Piotr Orlov characterised Rounds as an IDM album with production indebted to hip-hop music in both its "collage approach" and emphasis on "steady grooves". Rolling Stone's Kory Grow describes the album as "electronic dance music with a pulse and a heart murmur."

John Bush of AllMusic found the album contained elements of electronic and experimental music combined with "a dreamy melodicism sure to endear it to indie pop fans." Dusted critic Michael Crumsho noticed the influence of folk and jazz, writing that Hebden had "taken his earlier nods to other specific genres and turned them into something wholly his own." PopMatters' Adrien Begrand noted how "Hebden shifts the focus from hip-hop beats, jazz influences, and far-reaching sonic adventurousness, to a more spare, focused sound" that contributed to Rounds' original sound. Nick Southall, in his review for Stylus Magazine, stated that "it is more of the same, but 'the same' for Four Tet is perpetual evolution and motion."

"Unspoken" was named by several critics as the album's centrepiece Begrand described it as "virtuosic laptop music". NME critic Tony Naylor thought that "As Serious as Your Life" was one of the album's more straightforward songs. The closing track, "Slow Jam", was described by Begrand as a "warm, wide-eyed, watching-the-sun-rise song" that features chiming guitars and a sample of a child's squeaky toy.

== Release ==
The track "She Moves She" was released as a 12-inch single on 31 March 2003, with "Cradle" on the B-side. Rounds was released on double vinyl and compact disc by Domino on 5 May 2003, spending one week on the UK Albums Chart at number 60. The second single, "As Serious as Your Life", was released in October 2003 on 7- and 12-inch formats featuring remixes and a 23-minute live version; a second 12-inch of the same song, containing a remix by Jay Dee featuring rapping by Guilty Simpson, was released on 18 November 2003. An EP, My Angel Rocks Back and Forth, was released in May 2004, containing Rounds tracks, two remixes, and the unreleased songs "I've Got Viking in Me" and "All the Chimers", plus a DVD of music videos for "My Angel Rocks Back and Forth", "She Moves She", "As Serious as Your Life" and Pause single "No More Mosquitoes".

Domino reissued Rounds in May 2013 on double vinyl, CD, and download. The CD and vinyl releases include a bonus CD of live material recorded in 2004 previously only available on the limited edition 2004 live album Live in Copenhagen 30th March 2004.

== Reception ==
Professional ratings
Aggregate scores
Source	Rating
Metacritic	89/100
Review scores
Source	Rating
AllMusic	5/5 stars
Blender	4/5 stars
The Guardian	5/5 stars
The Independent	4/5 stars
NME	9/10
Pitchfork	8.2/10
Q	4/5 stars
Rolling Stone	3/5 stars
Spin	A−
The Village Voice	A−

Rounds received critical acclaim. At Metacritic, which assigns a weighted average score out of 100 to reviews and ratings from mainstream critics, the album received a metascore of 89 based on 26 reviews, indicating "universal acclaim".

AllMusic reviewer John Bush wrote that "though Rounds is experimental by nature" it "offers something for nearly every audience that could approach it." Michael Crumsho of Dusted found the album "a musical salvo from an artist who's confidently coming into his own", describing it as "a cozy, evocative soundtrack that's as intricate as it is beautiful." In his review for The Guardian, David Peschek described the album as "a trove of bewitching melody and subtle invention", and wrote that "Rounds succeeds not only as a meticulously conceived piece of art but also as a moving expression of human warmth." In NME, Tony Naylor wrote that the album was "extraordinary", "essential" and "full of remarkable sonic ideas." Andy Beta, writing for Pitchfork, praised the record's "internal order" that "allows it to stand out against previous laptop explorations of immense record collections".

Adrien Begrand's review in PopMatters found that Rounds is "a remarkable record" and that "sublime, computer-crafted recordings like Rounds provides in spades are making the most exciting sounds right now in 2003." In Spin, Will Hermes described the album as a "varied trip" and noted "a darker vibe suggesting the influence of Hebden's labelmate Dan Snaith of Manitoba." Stylus Magazine writer Nick Southall recognised Hebden's "perpetual evolution and motion," declaring that "this is simply a great record of beautiful music." Robert Christgau's review of Rounds for The Village Voice argued that Hebden "imagines an aural space in which electronic malfunction is cute rather than annoying or ominous," using "the computer as music box." Tom Ridge of The Wire stated that "nothing here sounds like an exercise in genre plundering," and that "Hebden has devised a musical identity that is distinctly different from his work with Fridge, but both projects share a passion for defying boundaries."

=== Accolades ===
Rounds was ranked number four on the Metacritic list of highest-scoring albums of 2003, and was named as one of the best albums of 2003 by many publications, including the NME, The Wire, The Observer, Prefix, Pitchfork, Drowned in Sound, Collective, Q, and Uncut.

Several publications rated Rounds as one of the best albums of the decade, with Pitchfork placing it at number 123 on their list of the top 200 albums of the 2000s. On similar lists, Drowned in Sound placed it at number 13, Beats Per Minute placed it at number 99, and No Ripcord at number 48. GQ rated it as one of the 40 best albums of the 21st century.

== Track listing ==
All tracks are written by Kieran Hebden

No.	Title	Length
1.	"Hands"	5:40
2.	"She Moves She"	4:38
3.	"First Thing"	1:12
4.	"My Angel Rocks Back and Forth"	5:06
5.	"Spirit Fingers"	3:21
6.	"Unspoken"	9:29
7.	"Chia"	0:31
8.	"As Serious as Your Life"	4:36
9.	"And They All Look Broken Hearted"	5:06
10.	"Slow Jam"	5:16

== Personnel ==
Credits adapted from liner notes of Rounds.

- Kieran Hebden – music, production

Additional personnel

- Guy Davie – mastering
- Matt Cooper – layout, design
- Jason Evans – photography

== Charts ==
Chart (2003)	Peak position
Irish Albums (IRMA)	57
Scottish Albums (Official Charts)	48
UK Albums (Official Charts)	60
UK Independent Albums (Official Charts)	6
US Top Dance Albums (Billboard)	25
