= First Meeting =

First Meeting may refer to:

- First Meeting (Miroslav Vitouš album)
- First Meeting (Tethered Moon album)
- First Meeting: Live in London, Volume 1, an album by Lee Konitz

== See also ==
- First Meetings, a 2002 collection of science fiction short stories by American writer Orson Scott Card
