= Wiener Taschenoper =

Wiener Taschenoper (Vienna pocket opera) is an Austrian opera company based in Vienna. Insight Guides cite them and the Neue Oper Wien as "two of the independent groups which perform exclusively 20th and 21st-century opera".

== Productions ==
Choreographer Saskia Hölbling staged in 2002 Combattimento di Tancredi e Clorinda by Claudio Monteverdi combined with A-Ronne by Luciano Berio. In 2004 she developed a choreography with four dancers for Labyrinth in collaboration with the composer Wolfgang Mitterer and the video artist Alexej Paryla, It was performed at the Semper Depot of Vienna by DANS.KIAS, with Katia Plaschka, soprano.

In 2008, the second act of Karlheinz Stockhausen's Donnerstag aus Licht, titled Michaels Reise um die Erde (Michael's Journey Around the Earth) was staged, in collaboration with the Wiener Festwochen, by Carlus Padrissa of La Fura dels Baus, with stage direction by Roland Olbeter. It was performed by Marco Blaauw (trumpet), Nicola Jürgensen (basset horn), and musikFabrik, directed by Peter Rundel. The production was also shown in Cologne, Venice, Warsaw, Dresden and Paris.

In 2009, Hölbling produced three works by Berio: Naturale, Visage and Sequenza V.

=== Operas for children ===
Since 2006 the Wiener Taschenoper has produced contemporary operas for children. A series of operas based on fairy tales of the Brothers Grimm have included Wolfgang Mitterer's Das Tapfere Schneiderlein, Ali N. Askin's Eisenhans, and in 2010 Die Gänsemagd by Iris ter Schiphorst.

In 2008 John Cage's A House Full of Music was staged, accompanied by detailed background information and material for teachers. Walther Soyka's Das kleine Gespenst after Otfried Preußler's book was performed in 2010 in collaboration with the Graz Opera.
