= Play Kurt Weill =

Play Kurt Weill may refer to:

- The Young Gods Play Kurt Weill, 1991 album by the Young Gods
- Tethered Moon Play Kurt Weill, 1995 album by Tethered Moon
