= Music for Zen Meditation =

Studio album by Tony Scott
- Released: 1964
- Recorded: February 1964
- Genre: Jazz, New-age
- Length: 44:28
- Label: Verve
- Producer: Richard Seidel

Tony Scott chronology
Music for Zen Meditation (1964)	Tony Scott (1967)

Professional ratings
Review scores
Source	Rating
Allmusic	4/5 stars

Music for Zen Meditation is a 1964 album by jazz clarinetist Tony Scott.

The album is considered to be the first new-age record. Music for Zen Meditation is mostly improvised by Scott, Shinichi Yuize (koto) and Hōzan Yamamoto (shakuhachi).

== Sampling ==
The fourth track entitled "After the Snow, the Fragrance" has been sampled by electronic artist Four Tet for his track entitled "Parks", which appeared on his 2001 release, Pause.

== Track listing ==
1. "Is All Not One?" (Tony Scott, Hōzan Yamamoto, Shinichi Yuize) – 3:15
2. "The Murmuring Sound of the Mountain Stream" (Scott, Yuize) – 8:05
3. "A Quivering Leaf, Ask the Winds" (Yamamoto)– 2:30
4. "After the Snow, the Fragrance" (Scott, Yuize) – 7:00
5. "To Drift Like Clouds" (Yamamoto, Yuize) – 1:38
6. "Za-Zen (Meditation)" (Scott, Yamamoto) – 2:05
7. "Prajna-Paramita-Hridaya Sutra (Sutra Chant)" (Scott, Yuize) – 7:10
8. "Sanzen (Moment of Truth)" (Scott, Yuize) – 6:45
9. "Satori (Enlightenment)" (Scott, Yuize) – 5:25

=== Performance ===
- Tony Scott - clarinet
- Shinichi Yuize - koto
- Hōzan Yamamoto - shakuhachi

== See also ==
- Meditation music
- 1964 in music
- Instrumental music
