= Masabumi Kikuchi =

Japanese jazz pianist and composer

Masabumi Kikuchi 菊地 雅章

Background information
- Also known as: Poo Sun
- Born: Masabumi Kikuchi; 19 October 1939; Tokyo, Japan
- Died: 6 July 2015 (aged 75) Manhasset, New York, United States
- Genre: Jazz
- Instrument: Piano
- Website: Fan Site

Masabumi Kikuchi (菊地 雅章, Kikuchi Masabumi; 19 October 1939 – 6 July 2015) was a Japanese jazz pianist and composer known for his unique playing style. He worked with many diverse musicians, including Sonny Rollins, Miles Davis, McCoy Tyner, Elvin Jones, Gary Peacock and Paul Motian, and collaborated with Gil Evans and Tōru Takemitsu.

== Biography ==
Masabumi Kikuchi was born in Tokyo in 1939. Following the firebombing of Tokyo in 1945, his family moved out of the city and settled in the rural Aizuwakamatsu, Fukushima prefecture, where his parents were born.

He studied music at the Tokyo Art College High School. While a student, he began buying second-hand records, most likely left behind by American soldiers. His early influences were Duke Ellington, Miles Davis and Thelonious Monk. After graduating, he joined Lionel Hampton's Japanese touring band. He started a quintet with Terumasa Hino but soon after left for the US after winning a scholarship to study at Berklee College of Music.

He died from a subdural hematoma on 6 July 2015 at a hospital in Manhasset, New York. At the time of his death, he lived in Manhattan, New York City.

== Discography ==
=== As leader ===
Year recorded	Title	Label	Year released	Notes
1969	Matrix	Victor	1969	With Tetsuo Fushimi (trumpet), Hideyuki Kikuchi (alto sax), Akio Nishimura (tenor sax), Hironori Takiya (bass), Takahiro Suzuki (drums) as Victor Modern Jazz Sextet
1970	Re-confirmation	Philips	1970	Sextet with Kosuke Mine (alto saxophone), Yoshio Ikeda (bass, electric bass), Hiroshi Murakami (drums), Keiji Kishida (drums)
1970	Poo-Sun	Philips	1970	With Kosuke Mine (soprano sax, alto sax), Hideo Ichikawa (electric piano, organ), Yoshio Ikeda (bass), Motohiko Hino (drums), Hiroshi Murakami (drums), Keiji Kishida (percussion)
1970	Masabumi Kikuchi In Concert	Philips	1971	Sextet with Kosuke Mine (soprano saxophone, percussion), Yoshio Ikeda (bass), Hiroshi Murakami (drums), Keiji Kishida (drums)
1972	Masabumi Kikuchi with Gil Evans	Philips	1972	With Gil Evans (conductor, piano), Billy Harper (tenner sax, flute, chime), Marvin Peterson (trumpet, flugel horn), Kohsuke Mine (alto sax, soprano sax), Shigeo Suzuki (alto sax, flute), Kiyoshige Matsubara (French horn), Nao Yamamoto (French horn), Shozo Nakagawa (piccolo flute, alto flute, bass flute), Takashi Asahi (piccolo flute, alto flute, bass flute), Yukio Etoh (piccolo flute, alto flute, bass flute), Kunitoshi Shinohara (trumpet, flugel horn), Takehisa Suzuki (trumpet, flugel horn), Hiroshi Munekiyo (tuba), Kikuzo Tado (tuba), Tadataka Nakazawa (bass tuba), Michiko Takahashi (marimba, vibraphone), Masayuki Takayanagi (electric guitar), Sadanori Nakamure (electric guitar), Yoshio Suzuki (bass), Isao Etoh (electric bass), Masahiko Togashi (drums), Yoshiyuki Nakamura (drums), Kohichi Yamaguchi (timpani), Hideo Miyata (percussion)
1974	East Wind	East Wind	1974	With Terumasa Hino (trumpet), Kosuke Mine (tenor sax), Juini Booth (bass), Eric Gravatt (drums)
1978	But Not for Me	Flying Disk	1978	With Gary Peacock (bass, percussion), Al Foster (drums, percussion), Badal Roy (tabla), Alyrio Lima (percussion), Azzedin Weston (percussion)
1980–81	Susto	CBS/Sony	1981	With Terumasa Hino (cornet), Steve Grossman (soprano sax, tenor sax), Dave Liebman (soprano sax, tenor sax, flute), Richie Morales and Victor "Yahya" Jones (drums), Hassan Jenkins(bass), James Mason, Butch Campbell, Marlon Graves, Barry Finnerty and Billy Paterson (guitar), Alyrio Lima, Aiyb Dieng and Airto Moreira (percussion), Sam Morrison (soprano sax), Ed Walsh (synth programming)
1980–81	One-Way Traveller	CBS/Sony	1982	With Terumasa Hino (cornet), Steve Grossman (soprano sax, tenor sax), Richie Morales and Victor "Yahya" Jones (drums), Hassan Jenkins(bass), James Mason, Butch Campbell, Marlon Graves, Gass Farkon, Billy Paterson and Ronald Drayton (guitar), Alyrio Lima, Aiyb Dieng and Airto Moreira (percussion), Sam Morrison (soprano sax)
1983–86?	Earth (地, Chi)	Geronimo	1988	"Six Elements (六大, Rokudai)" series. Solo synthesizer.
1984–86	Water (水, Sui)	Geronimo	1988	"Six Elements (六大, Rokudai)" series. Solo synthesizer.
1984–86	Fire (火, Ka)	Geronimo	1988	"Six Elements (六大, Rokudai)" series. Solo synthesizer.
1984–86	Wind (風, Fuu)	Geronimo	1988	"Six Elements (六大, Rokudai)" series. Solo synthesizer.
1984–86	Air (空, Kuu)	Geronimo	1988	"Six Elements (六大, Rokudai)" series. Solo synthesizer.
1985–87	Mind (識, Shiki)	Geronimo	1988	"Six Elements (六大, Rokudai)" series. Solo synthesizer.
1986–89	Aurora	Rhizome Sketch	1989	Solo synthesizer. Four variations of the track "Aurora" in previous album Water (水, Sui).
1989	Attached (未練, Miren)	transheart	1989	Solo piano
1989–90	Dreamachine	transheart, Pioneer	1992	With Bernie Worrell (synthesizer), Bootsy Collins (space-bass), Bill Laswell (bass), Nicky Skopelitis (guitar), Aiyb Dieng (percussion)
1990	Live at Jazz inn Lovely 1990	NoBusiness	2020	With Masayuki Takayanagi (guitar), Nobuyoshi Ino (bass)
1992–93	Feel You	Paddle Wheel	1993	Trio, with James Genus (bass), Victor Jones (drums)
1994	After Hours	Verve	1994	Solo piano
1994	After Hours 2	PJL	2002	Solo piano
1996	Raw Material #1	Alfa	1997	With Toshiyuki Goto, DJ Katsuya and DJ Hiro (mixing), Mike Barry (guitar), Scott Wozniak (keyboard), Aiyb Dieng (percussion), Papa Jube, Veronica White, Bongo Gaston and Jean Baaptiste (vocals), David Dyson (bass), William "Space Man" Paterson (guitar), Darryl Foster (tenor sax)
1997–98	Melancholy Gil	Verve	2001	Solo piano
2009	Sunrise	ECM	2012	Trio, with Thomas Morgan (bass), Paul Motian (drums)
2012	Black Orpheus	ECM	2016	Solo piano; in concert
2013	Hanamichi: The Final Studio Recording	Red Hook Records	2021	Solo piano; studio recording

=== As co-leader ===
- Gary Peacock, Hiroshi Murakami, Masabumi Kikuchi, Eastward (CBS/Sony, 1970)
- Hōzan Yamamoto + Masabumi Kikuchi – Ginkai (Philips [Japan], 1971) also with Gary Peacock and Hiroshi Murakami. recorded in 1970. reissued in 1994
- Masabumi Kikuchi, Masahiko Togashi, Gary Peacock, Poesy: The Man Who Keeps Washing His Hands (Philips [Japan], 1971)
- Gary Peacock, Hiroshi Murakami, Masahiko Togashi, Masabumi Kikuchi, Voices (Sony, 1971)
- Elvin Jones / Masabumi Kikuchi, Hollow Out (Philips [Japan], 1973) – recorded in 1972
- Masahiko Togashi + Masabumi Kikuchi, Concerto (Ninety-One, 1991) – 2CD
- Terumasa Hino, Masahiko Togashi, Masabumi Kikuchi, Triple Helix (Enja, 1993) – live
- P.M.P. (Poo Masabumi Kikuchi, Marc Johnson, Paul Motian) Miles Mode (Sony, 1993) – tribute to Miles Davis
- Masabumi Kikuchi & Takeshi Shibuya, Tandem (Verve, 2000)
- Masabumi Kikuchi, Ben Street, Thomas Morgan, Kresten Osgood, Kikuchi/Street/Morgan/Osgood (Ilk music, 2015) – Recorded in 2008

=== As a member ===
Terumasa Hino-Masabumi Kikuchi Quintet

- Hino=Kikuchi Quintet (Columbia/Takt Jazz Series, 1969) – rec. 1968
- Acoustic Boogie (Blue Note, 1995)
- Moment: Alive at Blue Note Tokyo (EMI/Somethin' Else, 1996) – live rec. 1995

Kochi
(Ensemble with Al Foster, Anthony Jackson, Dave Liebman, James Mtume, Reggie Lucas, Steve Grossman and Terumasa Hino)

- Wishes= ウィッシズ (East Wind, 1976; Inner City, 1978)

AAOBB (All Night All right Off White Boogie Band)
(with Conrad Adderley, Victor Jones, Aïyb Dieng, Kosuke Mine, Kelvyn Bell, Tomas Doncker, William "Spaceman" Patterson)

- AAOBB (Tokuma Japan, 1990)

Tethered Moon
(Trio with Paul Motian and Gary Peacock)

- First Meeting (Winter & Winter, 1997) - rec. 1990–91
- Tethered Moon (King/Paddle Wheel, 1992, Evidence, 1993)
- Triangle (King/Paddle Wheel, 1992)
- Plays Jimi Hendrix+ (Polydor, 1997)
- Tethered Moon Play Kurt Weill (JMT, 1995; reissued on Winter & Winter, 2005)
- Chansons d’Édith Piaf (Winter & Winter, 1999)
- Experiencing Tosca (Winter & Winter, 2004)

Slash Trio
(Trio with Masaaki Kikuchi and Tatsuya Yoshida)

- Slash 1° (PJL, 2001)
- Slash 2° (PJL, 2002)
- Slash 3°: Live At Motion Blue Yokohama Vol.1 (PJL, 2002)
- Slash 4°: Live at Motion Blue yokohama Vol.2 (PJL, 2003)

=== Soundtrack album ===
- Hairpin Circus / A Short Story For Image: Original Soundtrack (Bridge, 2006) – Movie 1972

=== As sideman ===
With Gil Evans

- Gil Evans Live at the Royal Festival Hall London 1978 (RCA, 1979) - live
- The Rest of Gil Evans at the Royal Festival Hall 1978 (Mole Jazz, 1981) - live
- Live at the Public Theater (New York 1980) vol. 1 (Trio, 1980) – live
- Live at the Public Theater (New York 1980). Vol. 2 (Trio, 1981) – live

With Paul Motian

- Trio 2000 + One (Winter & Winter, 1997)
- Live at the Village Vanguard (Winter & Winter, 2006) – live
- Live at the Village Vanguard Vol. II (Winter & Winter, 2006) – live
- Live at the Village Vanguard Vol. III (Winter & Winter, 2006) – live

With others

- Pee Wee Ellis, Blues Mission (Gramavision, 1993)
- Joe Henderson, Joe Henderson and Kikuchi, Hino in Concert (Fontana, 1974) – rec. live 1971
- Helen Merrill, You and the Night and the Music (Verve, 1998)
- Mal Waldron, Mal: Live 4 to 1 (Philips, 1971)

== Legacy in New York State Property Law ==
In the late 1970s, Kikuchi lived in New York City and rented a loft apartment on W. 20th Street. The large apartment, over 1700 square feet, was in a formerly commercial building adapted to artists spaces and mixed studio and apartment space. His space was filled with musical instruments and recording equipment; it contained a creative work space as well as living space. In late 1977, a health spa equipment sales business moved into the floor above Kikuchi's studio. A series of damaging water leaks, noise, and eventually large-scale building renovations began. These leaks and activities severely interfered with his work and daily living; eventually, Kikuchi sued his landlord, asserting that the combined events and activities breached the covenant of quiet enjoyment of his apartment. Importantly, he also claimed that the construction work effectively excluded his use of a generous swath of the loft apartment, that is he was constructively evicted by the landlord's acts and failure to act (related to the upstairs tenant). Despite the massive disruptions, he continued living in the apartment during the legal dispute. As per common law, an essential element of claiming constructive eviction is the tenant's moving out; the logic of the common law rule is rooted in proof: the landlord's actions must be so severe and materially impact the tenant that no one would continue to stay there under the circumstances.

The case was finally decided by the N.Y. Appellate Division in 1988. The Court's ruling in favor of Kikuchi established the notion of partial constructive eviction; that is, a partial exclusion from the quiet use and enjoyment of the property. The rule established in this case entitled a partially constructively evicted tenant to a pro rata rent reduction in proportion to the portion of the property they were unable to use. Importantly, the court held that leaving the premises was not required under this new concept. This rule has not been widely adopted in the United States and is a minority rule. The case, 528 N.Y.S.2d 554 (App. Div. 1988), is featured in contemporary property law case books to illustrate the concept of partial constructive eviction.
