= Hōzan Yamamoto =

Japanese shakuhachi player, composer, and lecturer

Hōzan Yamamoto 山本邦山
- Born: October 6, 1937
- Origin: Ōtsu, Shiga Prefecture, Japan
- Died: February 10, 2014 (aged 76)
- Instrument: shakuhachi
- Years active: 1958 – 2014

Hōzan Yamamoto (山本 邦山, Yamamoto Hōzan; October 6, 1937 - February 10, 2014 in Ōtsu, Shiga prefecture) was a Japanese shakuhachi player, composer and lecturer.

Yamamoto started playing the Japanese bamboo flute shakuhachi at the age of nine. He was initially taught by his father and then by Chozan Nakanishi. After graduating from Kyoto Junior College of Foreign Studies in 1958, he participated in UNESCO's World Folk Music Festival and graduated from Seiha Music College in 1962. Together with koto player Shinichi Yuize and Tony Scott, he recorded the album Music for Zen Meditation in February 1964.

After forming the widely acclaimed "Shakuhachi Sanbon Kai" trio in 1966 with Reibo Aoki and Katsuya Yokoyama, he electrified the conservative traditional scene by applying his talents to a variety of crossover collaborations. These have led him to work with such world-renowned musicians as Ravi Shankar, Helen Merrill, Gary Peacock and Karl Berger, and also with flute colleagues Jean-Pierre Rampal and Chris Hinze.

In 1980 he was invited to the renowned Donaueschingen music festival with his trio. He recorded music for the movie Samurai Reincarnation film and the album Masters of Zen: Shakuhachi & Organ with Wolfgang Mitterer. Through the 1970s and 1980s until his death he led the shakuhachi world receiving innumerable honors, including Japanese Ministry of Cultural Affairs and Education Ministerial awards for his performances, recordings (numbering in the hundreds) and compositions. He served as lecturer at the Tokyo National University of Fine Arts and Music and as head of the Hozan-kai Shakuhachi Guild.

In 2002 he was designated Living National Treasure of Japan. In 2004, he was awarded a Medal with Purple Ribbon. In 2009, he was awarded an Order of the Rising Sun, Gold Rays with Rosette.

On February 10, 2014, he died at a hospital in Tokyo.

== Discography ==
- 1964 Music for Zen Meditation
- 1968 Oriental Bossa Sounds a Union of Koto, Shakuhachi and Big Band (琴, 尺八, ビッグ・バンドによるスタンダード・ボッサ)
- 1969 Harlem Nocturne
- 1970 Hibiki - Contemporary Music for Japanese Traditional Instruments (響 - 和楽器による現代日本の音楽)
- 1971 Ginkai (銀界) (Philips [Japan]) with Masabumi Kikuchi, Gary Peacock and Hiroshi Murakami. recorded in 1970.
- 1974 Keden (怪顛)
- 1974 Kyorai (去来)
- 1975 Bamboo Suite (竹の組曲)
- 1975 Breath
- 1978 Kangetsu (寒月)
- 1985 Again and Again with Karl Berger
- 1986 Saichi
- 1986 Hozan Yamamoto vs Four Men
- 1990 Sankyoku
- 1996 Mugenkai - Ginkai II (夢幻界 - 銀界II)
- 1996 Works of Hozan Yamamoto (山本邦山 作品集)
- 1997 Otoño
- 1998 Amigos
- 2000 Fascination of the Shakuhachi (尺八の魅力)
