= Wolfgang Mitterer =

Austrian composer and musician

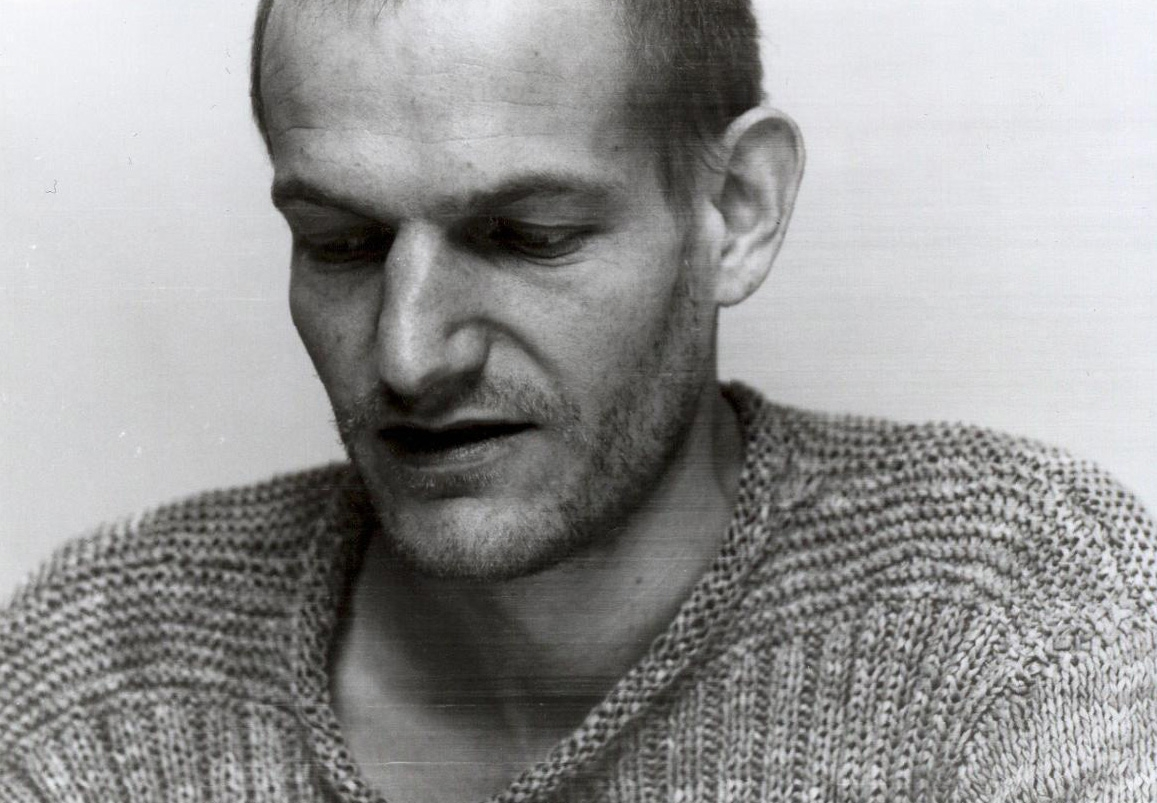
Wolfgang Mitterer

Wolfgang Mitterer (born 6 June 1958 in Lienz, East Tyrol) is an Austrian composer and musician (organ, keyboard).

== Biography ==
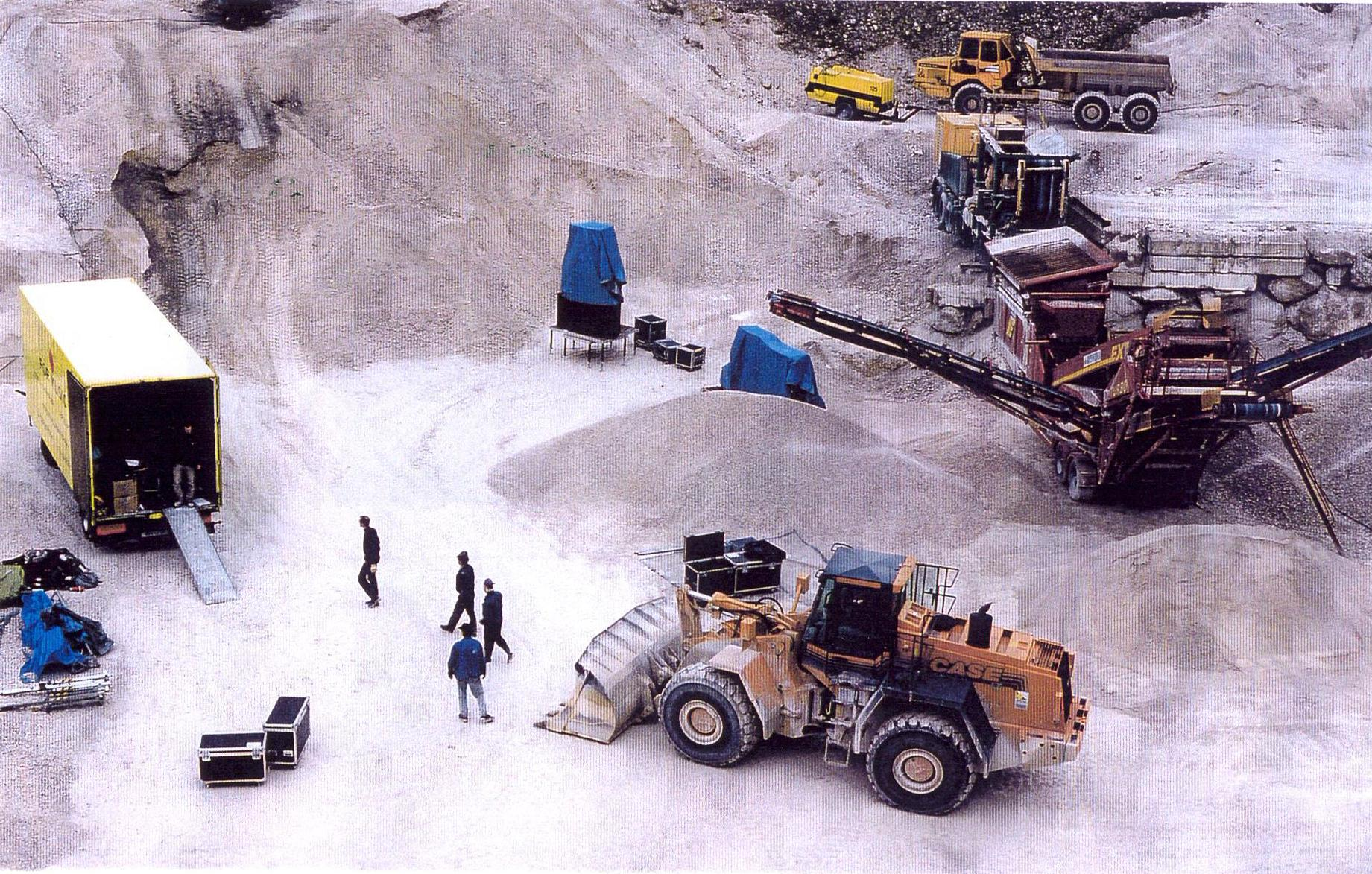
Vertical Silence

Wolfgang Mitterer studied with Otto Bruckner in Graz in 1977, and then from 1978 to 1983 at the University of Music and Performing Arts, Vienna he studied organ with Herbert Tachezi and composition with Heinrich Gattermeyer before working for a year at the studio for electroacoustic music (EMS) in Stockholm in 1983. This was followed by scholarships to Rome in 1988 and Berlin from 1995 to 1996. In 1991 Mitterer founded the Olongapo label.

Mitterer is considered to be one of the most important contemporary Austrian composers and a pioneer in the field of electroacoustic music. He currently does a lot of work together with other artists, frequently with international improvisation and jazz musicians such as Wolfgang Puschnig, Wolfgang Reisinger, Linda Sharrock, Klaus Dickbauer, Sainkho Namtchylak, Tscho Theissing, Tom Cora, Ernst Reijseger, Hozan Yamamoto, Roscoe Mitchell, Georg Breinschmid, David Liebman, David Moss, Max Nagl, Achim Tang, Patrick Pulsinger, Christof Kurzmann, Christian Fennesz, Marc Ducret, Franz Koglmann, Louis Sclavis, Harry Pepl and others.

In addition Mitterer has appeared as an organist, interpreting works by Bach, Messiaen and Ligeti among others. He has played in off locations such as in a quarry and in a disused fortification complex in Tyrol. He has also been involved in the Donaueschingen Festival (Donaueschinger Musiktage), the steirischer herbst and the Darmstädter Ferienkurse (Darmstadt International Summer Courses for New Music). Alongside sound installations and numerous electronic collages Wolfgang Mitterer has also written chamber music, scenic works, also operas, a piano concerto and music for orchestra and organ. In addition he has worked on experimental films, radio plays and theatres, has written live accompaniments to silent movies, but also music for the shows of a fashion designer.

Wolfgang Mitterer has lectured at the Vienna University of Music as well as at the Darmstadt International Summer Courses for New Music. He is a supervisory board member of Austro Mechana.

== Artistic works ==
Wolfgang Mitterer works and composes in the field of collective improvisation music, plays the organ and electronic instruments. The space-relatedness, which he frequently emphasises in his titles, gave works such as "Waldmusik", "silbersandmusik", "Turmbau zu Babel", "horizontal noise", "vertical silence" and "Labyrinth 6–11" a particular character. Sometimes up to 4000 people worked on these; in addition many traditional sounds such as brass bands and choral societies were used. These projects ultimately emerged from Wolfgang Mitterer's recordings in the most diverse musical genres and through joint appearances with representatives of the DJ scene and concerts, also through reinterpretations of classical works from Bach, to Schubert.

Wolfgang Mitterer also works on scenic and dramatic productions, the texts of which he partly collects and adapts himself, such as in "Ka und der Pavian", based on the Egyptian Book of the Dead and in "Massacre", based on religious murders from the 16th century after Christopher Marlowe or the lieder cycle "Im Sturm", based on the lieder of Franz Schubert. In 2004 his performance with dancers, Labyrinth for soprano and electronics, was performed at the Semper Depot of Vienna, by the group DANS.KIAS, choreographed by Saskia Hölbling, and Katia Plaschka, soprano.

== Awards (selection) ==
- 1986: German Record Critics' Prize
- 1989: State Scholarship for Composition
- 1990: Prix Ars Electronica Recognition Prize
- 1992: Max Brand Prize
- 1995: Emil Berlanda Prize
- 1995: Prix Futura Berlin
- 2002: Tyrol Prize for Art
- 2004: Vienna Music Prize
- 2008: Prix Italia

== Projects/Works ==
Special Projects
- Für VC und Klav (5') (for cello and piano)
- Fractals 13 (12') (for 13 musicians)
- Fractals 3 (11'40") (for bass clarinet and tape recorder)
- Fractals 9 (11'30") (for drums and electronics)
- Ostinato (1'29") (for saxophone and electronics)
- Senza Cauda (16') (2 variable players)
- Composto (9') (for cello and electronics)
- Larifari (4') (for oboe (solo))
- Charivari (6'30") (for oboe and electronics)
- Danza Saltata (8') (for oboe and piano)
- Idee Fixe (7') (for violin, oboe, clarinet and cello)
- Idefix (7') (for violin, oboe, clarinet, cello, banjo and piano)
- Farce (4') (for violin, oboe and banjo)
- Nichts (12') (for soprano with two tape recorders)
- Bewegungen (12') (for piano (solo))
- Uluru 1 (14') (for piano (solo))
- Uluru 2 (11'15") (for piano with tape recorder)
- Selbstähnlich (10'08") (for piano, positive organ and electronics)
- Facile (4'20") (for zither and tape recorder)
- String Quartet (60')
- Do not Touch it (6') (for 6 musicians)
- Just an Idea of Something (7') (for 6 musicians)
- Surfaces 1–5 (5') (for 4 players; with tape recorder)
- Fisis (32') (for orchestra, 5 soloists, 3 conductors)
- Networds 1–5 (22') (for 2 violins, 2 violas, cello, double bass, 2 clarinets, 1 horn, 1 piano, 1 drum set; with 8-channel tape recorder)
- Waldmusik (50') (for dialect speakers, soprano, 15 chopping boards, 3 woodworkers; with 8-channel tape recorder)
- Turmbau zu Babel (55') (for 4200 singers, 22 drum sets, 8 trumpets, 16 horns, 16 trombones, 8 tubas; with 8-channel tape recorder)
- Modemusik 1 (32'11") (with 8-channel tape recorder)
- Modemusik 2 (55') (for live electronics)
- Off Limits (for electric guitars, 2 drum sets, bass guitar, electronics, with tape recorder)
- Broken Consort (for voice, drums, oboe, tape recorders, piano and electronics)
- Dirty Tones (for violin, clarinet, cello, electronics)
- More Dirty Tones (for 2 drum sets, clarinet, electronics)
- Free Flow (for bass clarinet, piano, bass, drums; with tape recorders)
- Reluctant Games (for piano and electronics)
- Ab und zu (10'40") (with 2 tape recorders)
- Das Schattengedächtnis (20'07") (for vocals and piano, with 4-channel tape recorder)
- Amusie (50') (for violin, bassoon, oboe, clarinet, horn, organ, electronics)
- Contracis (45') (for variable players with tape recorder)
- Und träumte seltsam (14') (for soprano soloist, choir, 9 instruments; with tape recorder)
- Angelos (52') (for woodwind instruments, electric guitar, organ; with tape recorder)
- Taktspende (9") (for 9 players)
- With Usura (20') (for 15 students with home-made instruments; with 4 cassette recorders)
- Radio Fractal (42') (for 4 DJs, bass clarinet, electric guitar, 2 drum sets, vocals; with 8-channel tape recorders)
- Beat Music (73') (for 4 DJs, bass clarinet, electric guitar, 2 drum sets, vocals; with 8-channel tape recorder)
- Ka und der Pavian (75') (for 3 soloists, choir, 2 drum sets, 2 violins, 2 violas, 2 clarinets, 2 horns, 2 alto trombones, contra bassoon; with 16-channel tape recorder)
- Silbersandmusik (55') (for vocal ensemble, children's choir, 5 brass bands, wind quintet; with multiple-channel tape recorder)
- Vertical Silence (63') (for 4 DJs, 4 actors, fire brigade, mopeds, brass band, children's choir, opera singer, 2 caterpillar tractors, 1 truck, hunters with dogs, chain saws, etc.; with tape recorder)
- White Foam (73'04") (for 14 musicians, mezzo-soprano, speaker; with 16-channel tape recorder and action performer)
- Konzert für Klavier, Orchester und Elektronik (21'54")
- Horizontal Noise (for bass clarinet, electronics, brass band, children's choir, 3 sopranos, 10 drummers, etc.)
- Espirando (33', mit Saburo Teshigawara) (for 2 cembalos, 2 guitars and 4 banjos; with tape recorder)
- Kadout (11') (for live electronics)
- Massacre (83') (opera for 5 singers, 9 musicians and electronics)
- Crushrooms (95', Text: Albert Ostermaier) (for 3 singers, three speakers, women's choir, 11 instruments and electronics)
- Labyrinth 1+2 (55') (for soprano and electronics)
- Coloured Noise (70') (Brachial symphony for 23 musicians and electronics)
- Im Sturm (Liederzyklus) (for Georg Nigl)
- Labyrinth 3 (11')
- Das tapfere Schneiderlein (mini opera for children) (for 4 singers, actor, bass and electronics)
- Inwendig losgelöst (for Baroque orchestra ensemble and electronics)
- Labyrinth 4 (for 8-channel tape recorder and electronics)
- Mit einem lachenden Auge (10') (for 7 singers, 10 string instruments and 4 trombones in 5 groups)
- Go Next (for ensemble and electronics)
- Kleines Requiem (for soprano, organ and electronics)
For organ solo
- Stück Nr.2 (6'06")
- Äpfel und Birnen (6')
- Orgelmusik (42')
- Oboe (2'15")
- Grand jeu (52')
- Krummhorn (4'20")
- Vox acuta (8')
- Schlagstück (3'40")
- Regentoccata (8')
- Toccata ohne sorge (5'30")
- Stop playing (53')
- Piber 2003 (51')
- Tränenblind
- Seltsam unruhig
Organ and other instruments
- Sonori (8') (and trombone)
- Ive 1 (16'12") (and tape)
- Fractals 5 (11'05") (and 2trp, hr, tromb, tba, electr)
- Oitasitros (12'37") (and tape)
- Obsoderso (22'55") (a-sax and tape )
- Holladijodldijo (6'10") (and a-sax)
- Ive (15'03") (a-sax and tape)
- Sortisatio (15'40") (vc and tape)
- Histrio (3'50") (and vc)
- Tastatura (14'23") (small organ, prep-piano and electr.)
- Cantus Fractus (10') (flute, alto flute, ob, cb and percussion)
- Burleska (10') (and oboe)
- Mixture (30') (and electronics)
- Homage a Bonbonidodonidonido (5') (and electronics)
- 5 Stücke für Orgel und 7-Kanalband (24') (and tape)
- Balancement (15'03") (and tape)
- www.bwv.org
- Surfaces 1–5
- Fast Actions for Small Orgean
For tape recorder solo
- Realtimesinfony (5'12")
- Mir wird schlecht (20")
- Violettes Gras (53")
- Mimemata (20')
- Funeral March (2'45")
- Lied auf einem Ton (5'40")
- Lied eines einsamen (7'25")
- Mit dem Regen in die (11'30")
- Impac Drullen (3'11")
- Olongapo (8'12")
- Fractals 2 (12'36")
- Roxy (2'30")
- Materials: Slow Motion 1 (7'40")
- Quiet Moments
- Langsam mahlen (14'10")
- Reiseis (10')
- Sopop (58')
Collective compositions
- Astrologia Mundi (with G. Saelichar, K. Dickbauer, G. Schneider)
- Fractals 11 (with G. Schneider)
- Pat Brothers (with W. Puschnig, L. Sharrock, W. Reisinger)
- Hirn mit Ei (with H. Mutschlechner, K. Karlbauer)
- Call Boys Inc. (with G. Selichar, K. Dickbauer, G. Schneider)
- Namtchylak/Mitterer (with S. Namtchylak)
- Mitchell/Reisinger/Mitchell (with R. Mitchell, W. Reisinger)
- Matador 1 (with W. Reisinger und K. Dickbauer)
- The Four Seasons (with Hozan Yamamoto)
- Two Days Till Tomorrow (with Tom Cora)
- Lied (with Hans-Ola Ericsson)
- Mikado (with W. Reisinger, K. Dickbauer und G. Breinschmid)
- Transitions 1 (with Wolfgang Puschnig)
- Tenebre (with Wolfgang Reisinger und Ronald Deppe)
- I:R:S: (with Herbert Reisinger, Max Nagl, und Achim Tang)
- Carbon Copy (Tunakan/Mitterer)
- Carbon Copy und Alex Deutsch
- Badminton (mit Josef Klammer)
- Some Like it Soft (with dem Low Frequency Orchestra)
- Running Boxes (with Monolake)
- Box Blocks (with Louis Sclavis und Herbert Pirker)
Sound installations
- Greiz (21'03") (for 8-channel-tape (Installation))
- Zeit vergeht (55') (for 8-channel-tape and organ)
- Ottenstein (3 × 60'02") (for 16-channel-tape)
- Waldreichs (20') (stereo)
- TVKM (Tyrolean Museum of Popular Art)
Music for film
- Drunk (animation film from Hubert Sielecki)
- Nit weiter geht (animation film from Hubert Sielecki)
- Chargaff (documentation-film (Ebba Sinzinger))
- Trilogie (animation film from Hubert Sielecki)
- Falter (animation film from Hubert Sielecki)
- 1500 circa (cinema-spot)
- Nosferatu (live for organ and electronics)
- GT (with Günther Selichar)
- Carl Mayer (Dreiecksbeziehungen)
- Oktober (with Doron Goldfarb)
- Northern Light Pictures (Signation)
Theatre music
- Nu (Serapions-Theater Wien)
- 17 und 4 (Serapions-Theater Wien)
- Der Erzbischof ist da (Contraction Wien)
- Der Irre (Theater 89 Berlin)
- Lenz (Theater 89 Berlin)
- Guernika (Serapions-Theater Wien)
- Xanadu (Serapions-Theater Wien)
- Koltes (Contraction Wien)
- Nemo Nemo Loquetur (Serapions-Theater Wien)
- Glöckner von Belgrad (50')
- Theatermusik 4 (30')
- Theatermusik 5 (64')
- Musik zur Ursonate (from K. Schwitters)
- Ciao Mama (Serapions-Theater Wien)
- Battuto (drums, electronics, crying men choire, children's choire)
- Kirschgarten (for Theater St. Pölten)
- Nachtflug 2 (Theater an der Wien/Kabinetttheater)
- Eur.oper (Theater an der Wien/Kabinetttheater)
Radio music
- Nullmelodie (ORF; Brunner)
- Krok (SRG/ORF; Petschinka & Moessmer)
- Null Bytes (ORF; Eberhard Petschinka)
- Brain (ORF; Petschinka & Moessmer)
- Lady Killer (Deutschlandradio Berlin; Petschinka & Moessmer)
- Viruskonferenz (WDR/ORF; Petschinka)
- Splitter (14'25") (DRS; Petschinka)
- Rafael Sanchez readsOnce Upon a Time in the West (14'00") (WDR/ORF/MDR; Petschinka & Sanchez)
- Indigenous people (14'00") (Deutschlandradio Berlin/ORF; Petschinka)
- Goldrausch (21'47") (SRG; Petschinka & Mairowitz)
- Schrödingers Katze (19'00") (WDR/ORF; Bestenreiner & Petschinka)
- Casanova Matador (20') (WDR/ORF; Petschinka & Sanchez)
- Santo Subito (with Eberhard Petschinka)
- Nacht der Wünsche (33'; with Petschinka)
- Blackwater Redux (28'; with Petschinka)

== Discography ==
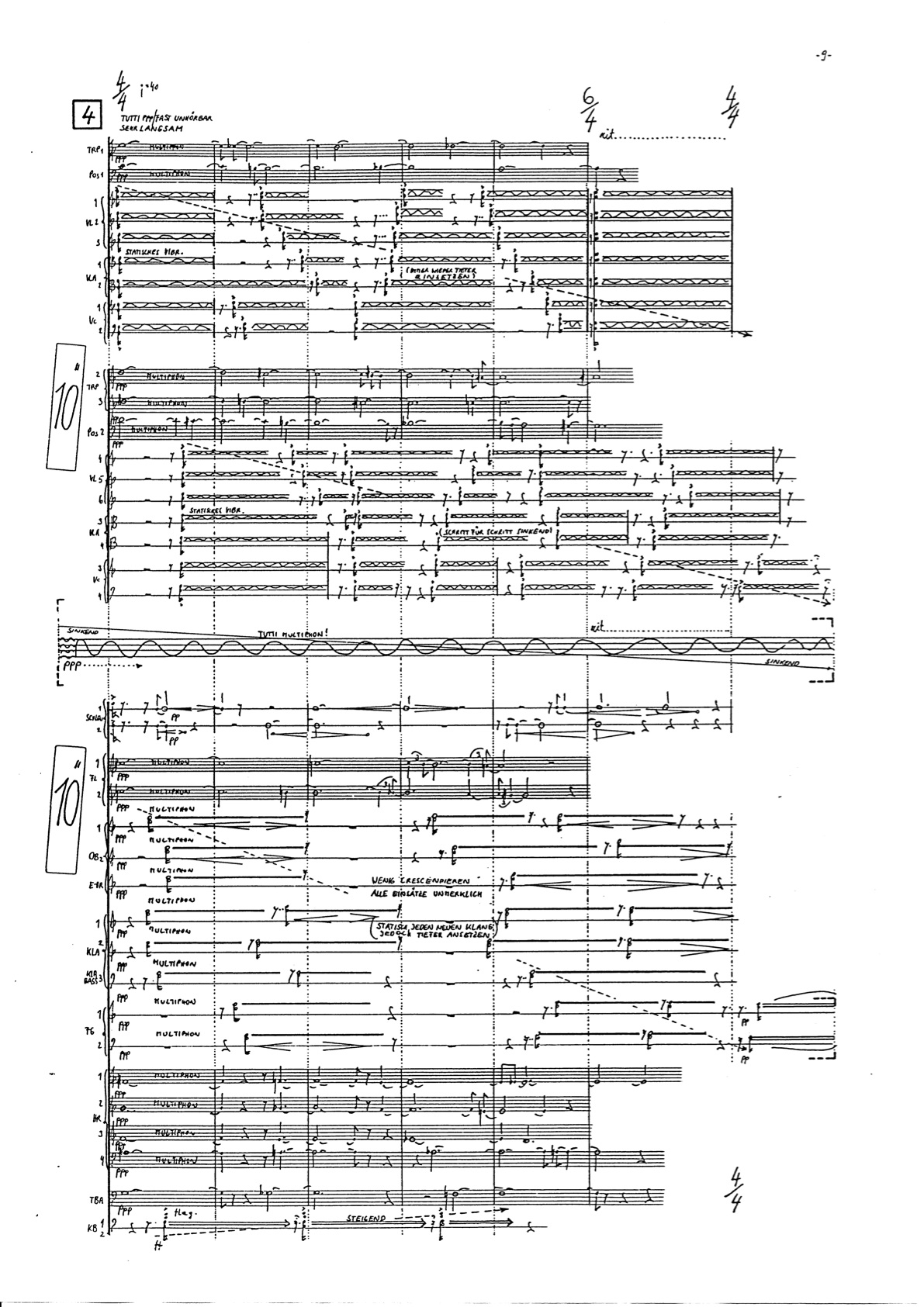
"Fisis", for orchestra, five soloists and three conductors

Published by col legno

- Konzert für Klavier und Orchester (Donaueschingen; 2000)
- Mixture 5 (live; Darmstadt 2004) (for organ and electronics)
- Das tapfere Schneiderlein (mini opera for children; 2007)
- Im Sturm (with Georg Nigl; 2007)
- Sopop (with Birgit Minichmayr; 2008)
- Music for checking e-mails (2009)
- Beethoven: 9in1 (2018)

Published by KAIROS Music

- Coloured Noise (with Klangforum Wien and Peter Rundel)

Published by HatHutRecords

- Radio Fractal / Beat Music (with Patrick Pulsinger, John Schröder, Max Nagl, ...)

Published by moers music

- Obsoderso (with Wolfgang Puschnig)
- Pat Brothers (with Wolfgang Reisinger, Wolfgang Puschnig, Linda Sharrock)
- Call Boys Inc. I (with Klaus Dickbauer, Günther Selichar and Gunter Schneider)

Published by LondonHALL

- Amusie

Published by wanadoo

- Masters of Zen Yamamoto/Mitterer (Shakuhachi/Orgel)

Limited edition; published on his own label, Olongapo

- Grand jeu
- Reluctant Games
- Violettes Gras
- Mimemata
- Matador
- Turmbau zu Babel
- Call Boys Inc. II
- Two Days till tomorrow
- Dirty Tones
- I.R.S.
- Carbon Copy
- Piber 2003

== Literature (selection) ==
Lexicon entries

- B. Günther, ed. (1997), Lexikon zeitgenössischr Musik aus Österreich (in German), Vienna, pp. 738–741
- Ch. Fastl; A. Rausch (2004), R. Flotzinger (ed.), "Mitterer, Familie", Österreichisches Musiklexikon (in German), vol. 3, Vienna, pp. 1453 f
- M. Meller (2008), Ludwig Finscher (ed.), "Mitterer, Wolfgang", Musik in Geschichte und Gegenwart (in German), Kassel: 562–563

Other texts

- R. Kager (1999), "W. Mitterers Ka und der Pavian : Klänge aus der Totenwelt", ÖMZ 54 (in German), pp. 40 f
- H. de La Motte-Haber (1999), "Con affetto: Wolfgang Mitterer – Komponist, Improvisator, Orgelspieler", Positionen Nr. 38 (in German), pp. 11–13
- M. Meller (1999), "Auf dünnem Pfad zur Explosion im Kopf : Der Musiker und Komponist Wolfgang Mitterer", Das Fenster Nr. 67 (in German), pp. 6356–6374
- M. Meller (2003), "Largo Macabro – Wolfgang Mitterer", Neue Musik in Tirol – Sieben Positionen zeitgenössischen Komponierens (in German), Diploma thesis, Innsbruck, pp. 95–112
- Wolfgang Stryi (2000), "Improvisation ist Nahrung für die Musik : Wolfgang Mitterer im Gespräch", MusikTexte Nr. 86/87 (in German), pp. 55 f
- M. Ziegler (2001), Komponieren heisst, ein Feld bereiten : Wolfgang Mitterers Konzert für Klavier, Orchester und Electronics (in German), Freiburg im Üechtland
- Chr. Baier (2003), "Paris ist eine Oper wert: Zu Wolfgang Mitterers Oper "Massacre"", ÖMZ 58 (in German), pp. 5–9
- R. Schulz, "Der Pluralismus in der Szene ist wichtig : Interview with Wolfgang Mitterer", Programmbuch Festival Klangspuren in Schwaz 2002 (in German), pp. 32–34
- L. Unterweger (2004), W. Mitterer (ed.), Musik inszenieren: visuelle und räumlische Aspekte der Musik unter besonderer Berücksichtigung der Raumkompositionen (in German), Diploma thesis, Vienna
- M. Meller; W. Mitterer (2008), M. Fink; K. Drexel (eds.), "Porträt und Werkanalyse", Positionen zeitgenössischen Komponierens, Mg. Tirols (in German), vol. 3, Innsbruck
