= Chansons d'Édith Piaf =

Chansons d’Édith Piaf

Studio album by Masabumi Kikuchi, Gary Peacock & Paul Motian
- Released: 1999
- Recorded: May 1999
- Genre: chanson, jazz
- Length: 58:50
- Label: Winter & Winter 910 048
- Producer: Stefan Winter

Tethered Moon chronology
Tethered Moon Play Kurt Weill (1995)	Chansons d’Édith Piaf (1999)	Experiencing Tosca (2004)

Chansons d’Édith Piaf is an album by the group Tethered Moon, comprising pianist Masabumi Kikuchi, bassist Gary Peacock and drummer Paul Motian, recorded and released on the Winter & Winter label in 1999. The album is a tribute to the French cabaret singer Édith Piaf.

== Reception ==
Professional ratings
Review scores
Source	Rating
AllMusic	3/5 stars
PopMatters	7/10 stars

Alex Henderson in his review for AllMusic stated, "Tethered Moon embraces the late singer's repertoire on their own creative terms, and there's a definite freshness to the trio's impressionistic post-bop versions of "La Vie en Rose," "L'accordeoniste," "Bravo pour le Clown," and other gems associated with her. Without question, Chansons de Piaf is among the more adventurous and interesting jazz tributes of the 1990s".

The PopMatters review stated, "As palatable jazz, Chansons d’Édith Piaf is more than acceptable. It’s an accomplished and pleasurable work. Most Piaf-philes will doubtless recognize it for what it is—a set of liberal interpretations used as groundwork for skilled improvisation. Followers of the Little Sparrow should merely be aware that Tethered Moon have painted her with broad strokes".

Josef Woodard wrote in JazzTimes, "Tethered Moon, the inspired and uniquely flexible trio of Japanese pianist Masabumi Kikuchi, drummer Paul Motian and bassist Gary Peacock, brings to this project a passionate engagement and a willingness to take poetic liberties with the source material".

== Track listing ==
1. "L' Accordéoniste" (Michel Emer) - 6:00
2. "Que Nadie Sepa Mi Soufrir" (Ángel Cabral) - 4:53
3. "Fais Comme Si" (Marguerite Monnot) - 9:30
4. "Sous le Ciel de Paris" (Jean Dréjac, Hubert Giraud) - 7:32
5. "Le Petit Monsieur Triste" (Raymond Asso, Marguerite Monnot) - 5:55
6. "La Vie en rose" (Louiguy, Marguerite Monnot, Édith Piaf) - 9:06
7. "Bravo Pour le Clown" (Henri Contet, Louiguy) - 4:26
8. "L' Homme de Berlin" (Francis Lai) - 9:08
9. "Les Mots d'Amour" (Charles Dumont, Michel Rivgauche) - 2:20

== Personnel ==
- Masabumi Kikuchi - piano
- Gary Peacock - bass
- Paul Motian - drums
