= Hubert Sielecki =

Austrian artist

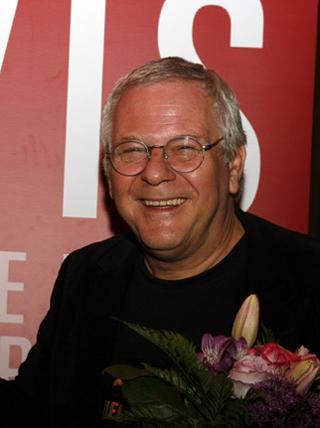
Hubert Sielecki, at the VIS Vienna Independent Shorts 2009

Hubert Sielecki (born 6 November 1946 in Rosenbach, Carinthia) is an Austrian artist, primarily known for his animated films.

== Biography ==
In 1985 he founded the Austrian chapter of the International Animated Film Association (ASIFA). In 1990–1991 he was a lecturer for film at the Hochschule für Bildende Künste Braunschweig. From 1986 to 1991 he was a member of film promotion boards in Austria. Sielecki is also a board member of the Vienna Künstlerhaus.

In 2007, on the occasion of the studio's 25th anniversary, he created the Hubert Sielecki Prize in several categories for artistic and experimental short film or animation for young Austrian filmmakers.

== Works ==
In 1968 he undertook his first film experiments. Together with Zbigniew Rybczyński he created his first animated movies. His movies are auteur films, in which he is mostly responsible for all areas of production from script to music. He worked with writers such as Gerhard Rühm, Antonio Fian and Gernot Wolfgruber, painters such as Maria Lassnig, Tone Fink or musicians such as Wolfgang Mitterer together. Through his specialization in animation film his work has a special position in the Austrian film avant-garde.

Sielecki's films were featured on film festivals in Germany, including at the Berlin International Film Festival, the Hamburg Short Film Festival, the International Videofestival Bochum, the Bamberg Short Film Festival and the Regensburg Short Film Week. Outside the German-speaking countries, he was shown on important festivals such as the Hiroshima International Animation Festival and the Kraków Film Festival.

== Filmography (selection) ==
- 1983: Nachrichten
- 1983: Die Suppe
- 1985: Festival
- 1989: Drunk (Music Wolfgang Mitterer)
- 1990: Life Show (45 Min.)
- 1991: Die Helden (A.S.K.)
- 1992: Maria Lassnig Kantate – together with Maria Lassnig
- 1994: Nitweitaget (Music Wolfgang Mitterer)
- 1994: Dachbodenstiege (Text Gernot Wolfgruber)
- 1995: Air Fright
- 1995: Book Factory
- 1996: Mein Kind (A.S.K.)
- 1997: Liebe TV
- 1998: Hitparade (A.S.K.)
- 2000: Raumausstatter Stagl (A.S.K.)
- 2001: The Upperlake Story (A.S.K.)
- 2001: Österreich!
- 2006: Drei Stücke – Spur (Text Karin Spielhofer)
- 2007: SEHEN (Text and voice Gerhard Rühm)
- 2007: WITZ with author Gerhard Rühm
- 2009: FOUL
- 2010: RADETZKYPLATZ (Text Antonio Fian)

== Awards (selection) ==
- Theodor Körner Prize 1982
- Promotion Price of Fine Arts – Film, 1985
- Prize and Audience Award, Trickfilmfestival Stuttgart 1984 (for Nachrichten)
- Viennale 1988, Kodak-Filmprize
- Short Film Award nomination, Berlin International Film Festival 1993 (for Maria Lassnig Kantate)
- Short Film Award "Weisses Gold", Diagonale 1995 (for Air Fright)
- BAF! Awards, Bradford-Festival in England, Winner in the Experimental Category 1999 (for "Hitparade")
