= Paws (EP) =

EP by Four Tet
- Released: December 7, 2001
- Genre: Folktronica; post-rock
- Length: 20:52
- Label: Domino
- Producer: Kieran Hebden

Four Tet chronology
Pause (2001)	Paws (2001)	Rounds (2003)

Paws is an EP released by Four Tet on 7 December 2001. It consists of remixes of works on his album Pause; the EP's name is a pun on the album's title.

== Track listing ==
1. "Glue of the Other World" – 7:34
2. "Hilarious Movie of the 90's" (Koushik's Funny Flick) – 2:39
3. "Hilarious Movie of the 90's" (Manitoba Remix) – 5:37
4. "No More Mosquitoes" (Boom Bip Remix) – 5:02
