= Experiencing Tosca =

Studio album by Masabumi Kikuchi, Gary Peacock & Paul Motian
- Released: 2004
- Recorded: December 14 & 15, 2002; Hit Factory, NYC
- Genre: classical music, opera, jazz
- Length: 55:26
- Label: Winter & Winter 910 093
- Producer: Stefan Winter

Tethered Moon chronology
Chansons d’Édith Piaf (1999)	Experiencing Tosca (2004)

Experiencing Tosca is an album by the group Tethered Moon, comprising pianist Masabumi Kikuchi, bassist Gary Peacock and drummer Paul Motian, recorded in late 2002 and released on the Winter & Winter label in 2004. The album features the groups interpretation of Giacomo Puccini's music for Tosca along with original compositions inspired by the opera.

== Reception ==
Professional ratings
Review scores
Source	Rating
Allmusic	3/5 stars

Allmusic awarded the album 3 stars, stating, "The very idea that Tethered Moon's members could put a new spin on Tosca no less than 102 years after Puccini wrote it speaks well of their interpretive powers. At times, Experiencing Tosca can be overly self-indulgent, but not in a way that is disrespectful of Puccini's contributions. Besides, a certain amount of self-indulgence is to be expected in avant-garde jazz, and Tethered Moon deserves credit for providing an album that is tasteful as well as intriguing."

The PopMatters review stated, "Very good in excessively separated parts."

John Kelman wrote on AllAboutJazz, "Experiencing Tosca may be the most successful Tethered Moon project. The interplay is sharp while the images are abstract, and there is solid evidence that while they only meet intermittently, Kikuchi, Peacock and Motian share a clear collective vision."

== Track listing ==
All compositions by Masabumi Kikuchi, Paul Motian and Gary Peacock after Giacomo Puccini except as indicated

1. "Prologue" - 1:42
2. "Part I" - 8:21
3. "Part II" - 6:25
4. "Part III" - 7:29
5. "Homage to Puccini" (Masabumi Kikuchi) - 7:00
6. "Ballad" - 8:14
7. "Blues for Tosca" (Kikuchi) - 5:18
8. "Part IV" - 11:01

== Personnel ==
- Masabumi Kikuchi - piano
- Gary Peacock - bass
- Paul Motian - drums
