= Saskia Hölbling =

Austrian choreographer and dancer (born 1971)

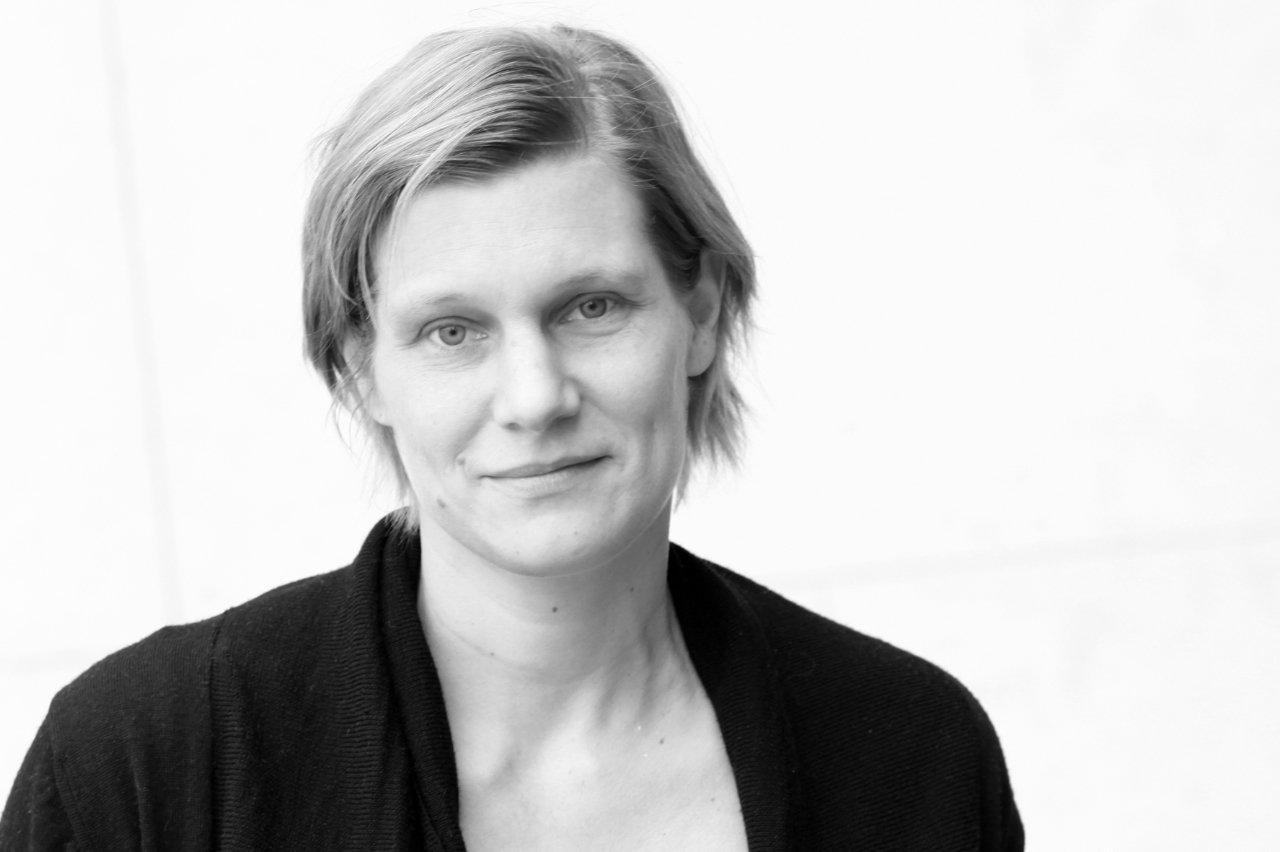
Saskia Hölbling

Saskia Hölbling (born 6 March 1971) is an Austrian choreographer and dancer (contemporary dance)

== Life and work ==
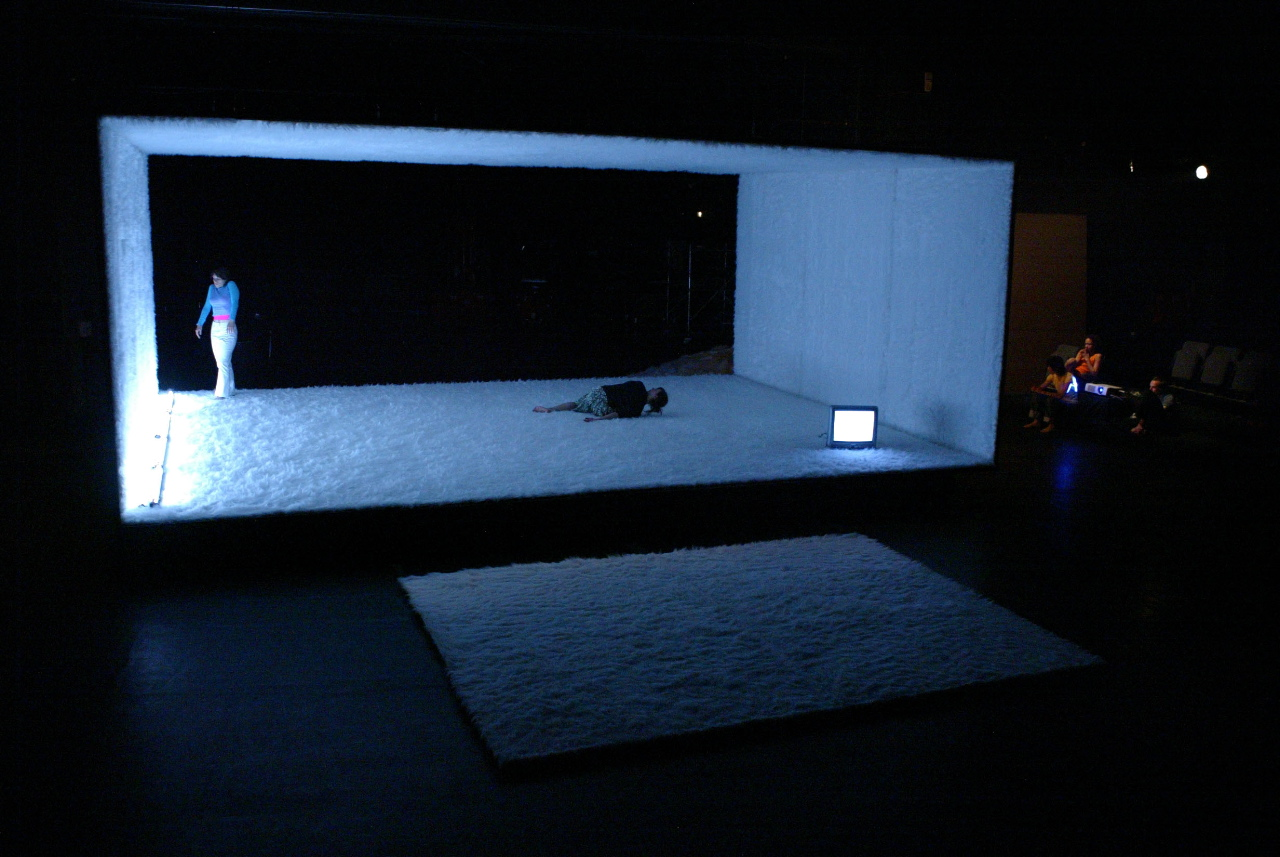
superposition corps

Hölbling was born in Vienna. She created her first works during her degree course at the Konservatorium der Stadt Wien in from 1991 to 1995. She then continued her training until 1997 at Anne Teresa De Keersmaeker's PARTS in Brussels. In 1996 she received a DanceWeb scholarship and in 2001 a scholarship to the Atelier du Monde/Montpellier Danse 2001. In 1995 Hölbling founded her company DANS.KIAS. Since then she has been one of the few Austrian female choreographers with their own company. She has written some 20 works for her Vienna-based troupe.

Saskia Hölbling has also created choreographies for existing contemporary music. In 2002 in collaboration with the Wiener Taschenoper she produced the two music-theatre productions Combattimento di Tancredi e Clorinda by Claudio Monteverdi and A-Ronne by Luciano Berio. In 2004 she developed a choreography with four dancers for the interactive live performance Labyrinth in collaboration with the composer Wolfgang Mitterer and the video artist Alexej Paryla, It was performed at the Semper Depot of Vienna by DANS.KIAS, with Katia Plaschka, soprano. In 2009 she again worked with the Wiener Taschenoper, producing three further works by Luciano Berio: Naturale, Visage and Sequenza V.

Alongside this she has repeatedly worked with artists from other branches, as in 2005, when Hölbling contributed the lecture performance Vom Sinn des Sinns for the project Philosophy on Stage by the philosopher Arno Böhler and the actor Susanne Ganzer. In 2008 together with the French dancer and choreographer Fabrice Ramalingom she created the duet fiction in between. In 2009 Hölbling went into theatre direction for the first time and together with students of the Max Reinhardt Seminar produced Die Hamletmaschine (by Heiner Müller).

As a dancer Saskia Hölbling has also been involved in works by Bob Wilson (USA), the W. Dorner company (Austria), Laurent Pichaud (France) and Benoît Lachambre (Canada) among others, and she also gives workshops at the Konservatorium der Stadt Wien (Vienna Conservatory) in the field of “contemporary dance” and gives seminars at the Max Reinhardt Seminar for actors at the University of Music and Performing Arts, Vienna.

In June 2009 Hölbling worked as a mentor, taking over the coaching for young choreographers in the framework of Stückwerk09 at the Tanzquartier Wien, in a joint project with the University of Vienna.

== Creative work and approach ==
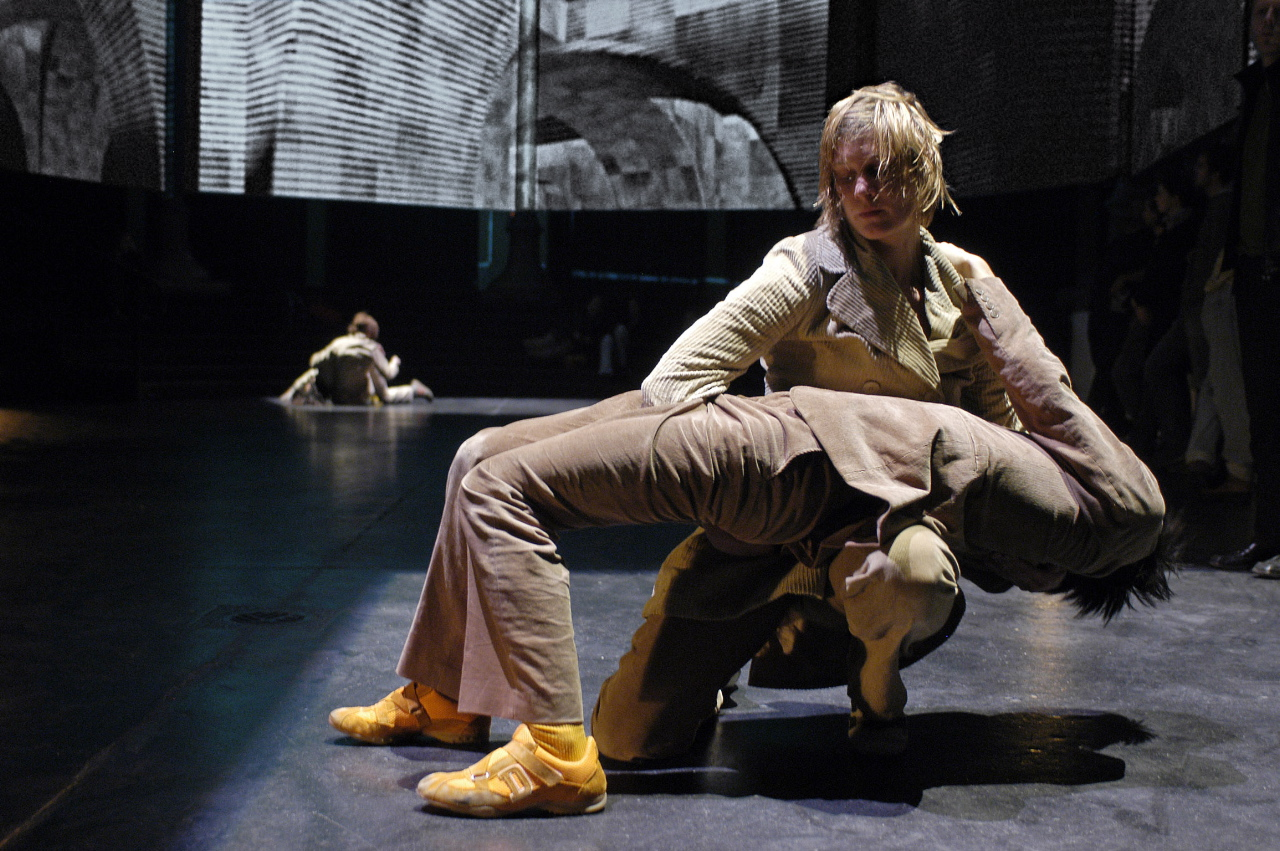
Saskia Hölbling in her work Labyrinth

In 2000 she received the Prix d’Auteur du Conseil Général de Seine-Saint Denis/Bagnolet for Do your desires still burn, and in 2002 she was awarded the Austrian Dance Production Prize for other feature.

In the context of the opening of the Tanzquartier Wien in 2001 she presented her solo rrr… (“reading, readings, reading”), which she had developed jointly with the choreographer Benoît Lachambre and the video artist Laurent Goldring.

While in intent/frame I und II (2000 und 2001) she was still working with interpersonal relations and behaviour patterns, in other feature (2002) she took up the human body as a mobile, organic mass. This continued with the solo exposition corps (2003) and superposition corps (2004). Secret sight (2009) observed and explored the interstices and lines between the bodies. Finally, pictographic events (2010) works with a large pool of signs and body images.

== Awards ==
- 2000: Prix d’Auteur du Conseil Général de la Seine-Saint-Denis/ Bagnolet for “Do your desires still burn”
- 2002: Austrian Dance Production Prize for “other feature”

== Works and projects ==
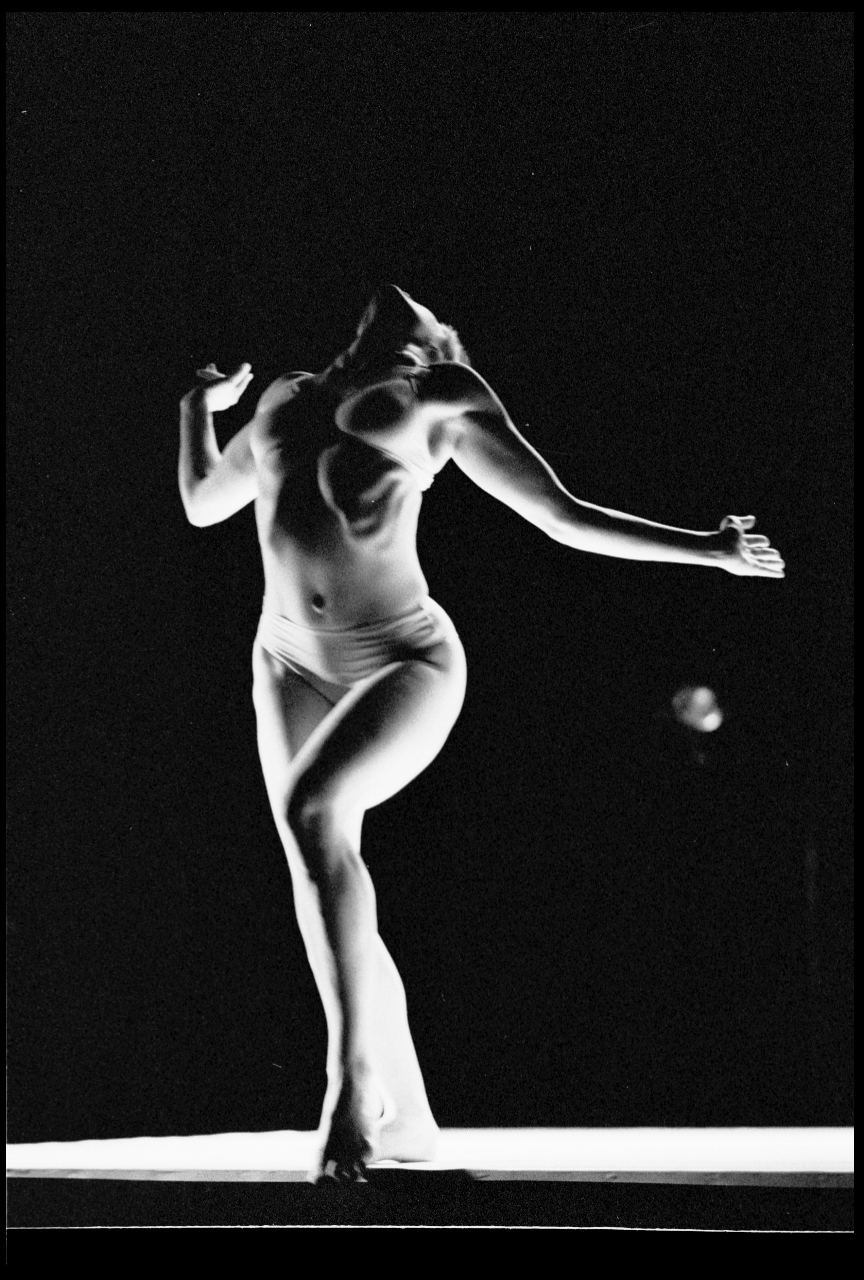
exposition corps

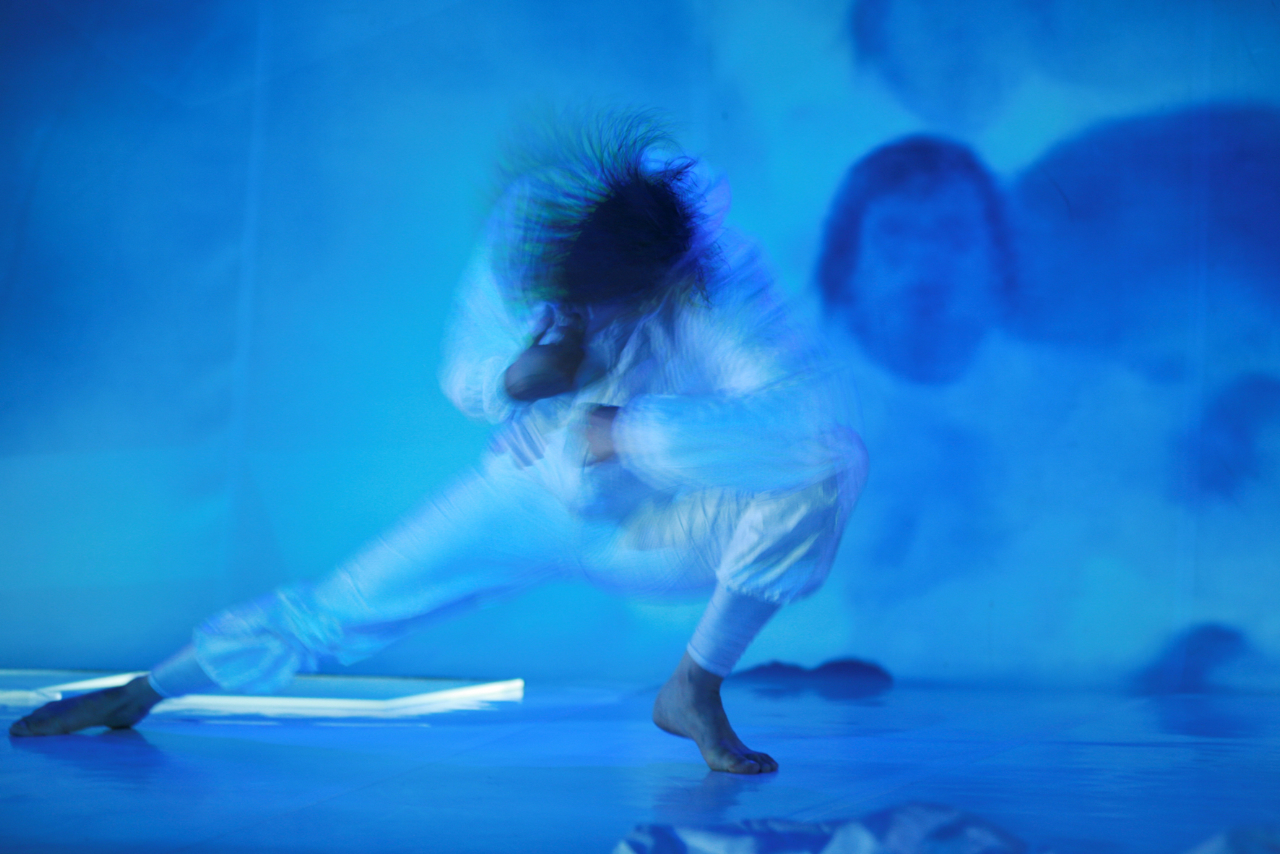
cat freeze 2

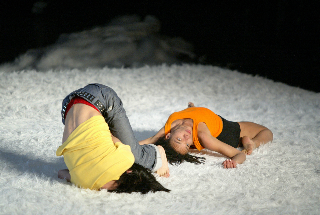
superposition corps

Choreographies for DANS.KIAS

- Duras-Trilogie (1995–1997)
- Do Your Desires Still Burn (1998)
- Distance.Two.Near (1999)
- Chat Gap (1999)
- in.tent//frame 1 (2000)
- in.tent//frame 2 (2001)
- other feature (2002)
- exposition corps (2003)
- superposition corps (2004)
- Your body is the shoreline (2005)
- Jours Blancs (2006)
- F on a pale ground (2007)
- cat in a deep freeze, bzw. cat freeze 2 (2007)
- secret sight (2008)

Guest choreographies

- out.of.between (1999) for the ballet of the Vienna State Opera
- emerge behind your eyes (2000) für das TanzTheaterWien

Collaboration with other artists

- rrr… (2001) – a solo developed in collaboration with Benoît Lachambre/CAN (artistic direction) and Laurent Goldring/F (video exhibition) for the opening of the Tanzquartier Wien
- philosophy on stage (2005) – a project initiated by the Austrian philosopher Arno Böhler and the actor Susanne Granzer.
- fiction in between (2008) – a duet with Fabrice Ramalingom

Productions

- 2002: production/direction of the Wien Modern festival (conductor: Peter Rundl/D)
- 2004: Music-theatre project Labyrinth, a collaboration between Wolfgang Mitterer (music), Alexej Paryla (video) and Saskia Hölbling (dance)
- 2009: production of three works by Luciano Berio: Naturale, Visage and Sequenza V in the Neue Saal of the Vienna Konzerthaus under the title Berio in Bewegung
- 2009: Production of the theatre work Hamletmaschine by Heiner Müller, a theatre-direction work commissioned by the Max Reinhardt Seminar for third-year students.
