= Susto (album) =

Studio album by Masabumi Kikuchi
- Released: 1981
- Recorded: November 1980 in New York, December 1980 and January 1981 in Tokyo
- Studio: Sound Ideas Studios, Brooklyn, New York; CBS/Sony Roppongi Studio, Tokyo
- Genre: Avant-garde jazz, jazz fusion
- Length: 47:36
- Label: CBS/Sony
- Producer: Masabumi Kikuchi, Kiyoshi Itoh

Masabumi Kikuchi chronology
But Not For Me (1978)	Susto (1981)	One-Way Traveller (1982)

Susto is an album by Japanese jazz pianist, composer and band leader Masabumi Kikuchi. This album was recorded in the same session with another album, One-Way Traveller, at his home studio, Sound Ideas Studios, New York, United States in November, 1980 and additionally recorded and remixed at CBS/Sony Roppongi Studio, Tokyo, Japan in December 1980 and January, 1981. This album was released in 1981 by CBS/Sony.

== Overview ==
Even his previous album, Wishes (East Wind, 1976) with Kochi ensemble - which involved almost all of Miles Davis' Agharta & Pangaea band from 1975 plus he's got his frequent collaborator Terumasa Hino, the Japanese trumpeter who's uncannily kept the flame of Davis's music alive – Kikuchi refuses to use the word seance for this session. But there's no escaping the fact that it's been over five years since Miles disappeared. The promise and possibilities of his electric music seemed to vanish with him. Even the fusion by his proteges and cohorts is hopelessly bland, stale, saccharine. So this attempt to exhume and extend the music of the master is going against the tide. He's attempting to make music that steps outside of time. He incorporated ambient patches and swaths of traditional Japanese music. But this time he wants that sound. He wants the hard grooves, the soaring trumpet, the hiccuping electric guitars and percolating mesh of polyrhythms.

== Reception ==
At Japrocksampler, author and musician Julian Cope writes about Susto that:

Kikuchi's most successful album, both artistically and commercially, was his 1981 Columbia release Susto, which was recorded around the same time as his collaboration with his friend Terumasa Hino, on the latter's groove LP Double Rainbow. Similarly, Kikuchi ploughed a single-minded funkathon groove over four long tracks. Taking his lead from Miles Davis' mid-70s funk band, Kikuchi invited Hino to play trumpet in addition to former Davis sax stars Dave Liebman and Steve Grossman. Kikuchi then reinforced his ensemble with an arsenal of guitarists and percussionists far beyond the point of overkill, but not with the same obliteration of ego that Miles achieved on such albums as Get Up with It and Agharta. Susto's high water mark is the fifteen-minute album closer "New Native", which actually features four guitarists – Billy Patterson, Butch Campbell, Ronnie Drayton and producer James Mason – plus two drummers and two percussionists. Ironically, the only track to omit trumpeter Hino is a failure, "Gumbo" being a lame lopsided reggae-disco piece of the style Can were want to lay on us around the time of Saw Delight. However, as Susto was dedicated to "Alexander Calder, Duke Ellington, Gil Evans, György Ligeti, Karlheinz Stockhausen and Toru Takemitsu", it's pretty clear where Kikuchi's pleasure centres truly lay.

== Track listing ==
No.	Title	Writer(s)	Length
1.	"Circle/Line"	Masabumi Kikuchi	14:53
2.	"City Snow"	Masabumi Kikuchi	7:40
3.	"Gumbo"	Masabumi Kikuchi	10:12
4.	"New Native"	Masabumi Kikuchi	14:51

2016 cd reissue bonus tracks
No.	Title	Writer(s)	Length
5.	"Gumbo" (single version)	Masabumi Kikuchi	3:48
6.	"Circle/Line" (single version)	Masabumi Kikuchi	3:38

== Credits ==
- Masabumi Kikuchi – keyboards, Rhodes synthesizer (2 solo, 3 solo, 4 solo), producer
- James Mason – electric guitar
- Hassan Jenkins – bass
- Richie Morales – drums
- Aïyb Dieng – percussion, congas (3, 4)
- Steve Grossman – soprano saxophone (1, 2, 4), tenor saxophone (3)
- Yahya Sediq – drums (1, 3, 4)
- Terumasa Hino – Bolivian flute (1), cornet (2, 4 solo)
- Dave Liebman – soprano saxophone (1, 4 solo), alto flute (2 solo), tenor saxophone (4)
- Sam Morrison – instruments (wind driver by), (1, 2, 3 solo)
- Airto Moreira – percussion (1, 2, 4)
- Marlon Graves – electric guitar (1, 3)
- Butch Campbell – electric guitar (2, 4)
- Billy Patterson – electric guitar (3, 4)
- Barry Finnerty – electric guitar (1)
- Alyrio Lima – percussion (1)
- Ed Walsh – Oberheim and synthesizer programming (1)

- Ryoko Ishioka – cover (design)
- Hisamitsu Noguchi – liner notes
- Kazumi Kurigami – photography by
- Kiyoshi Itoh – producer
- Jim McCurdy – recorded by
- Yochihiro Suzuki – recorded by (additional recording), mixed by
