= Ginkai =

Ginkai 銀界

Studio album by Hōzan Yamamoto
- Released: 1971
- Recorded: October 15 and October 20, 1970
- Genres: Fusion/ Jazz/ Japanese classical music
- Length: 50:04
- Labels: Philips, Nihon Phonogram co., ltd.
- Producer: Masaharu Honjo

Hōzan Yamamoto chronology
Breath (1975)	Ginkai 銀界 (1971)	Kangetsu (1978)

Ginkai (銀界, Ginkai; means Silver World) is a 1970 album released by Hōzan Yamamoto, featuring Western jazz instrumentalists such as bassist Gary Peacock, pianist Masabumi Kikuchi and drummer Hiroshi Murakami. It is an early example of fusion experiments with jazz and Japanese classical music.

== Track listing ==
All compositions by Masabumi Kikuchi

1. Prologue (序) - 3:10
2. Silver World (銀界) - 12:22
3. Stone Garden of Ryōan Temple (竜安寺の石庭) - 10:08
4. A Heavy Shower (驟雨) - 9:46
5. Sawanose (沢之瀬) - 11:46
6. Epilogue (終) - 2:52

== Personnel ==
- Hōzan Yamamoto – shakuhachi flute
- Masabumi Kikuchi – piano
- Gary Peacock – double-bass
- Hiroshi Murakami – drums
