= Yoshio Ikeda =

Japanese jazz double-bassist

Yoshio Ikeda (池田芳夫) (born January 1, 1942, Osaka) is a Japanese jazz double-bassist.

Ikeda received formal training in bass before studying jazz with Gary Peacock in the 1960s. He led his own small groups in the 1970s, and has worked with Terumasa Hino, Masabumi Kikuchi, Steve Lacy, Akira Miyazawa, Yuji Ohno, Allan Praskin, Masahiko Sato, Masahiko Togashi, Kiyoshi Sugimoto, Aki Takase, and Sadao Watanabe.
