= Pause (Four Tet album) =

Studio album by Four Tet
- Released: 28 May 2001
- Recorded: Spring and summer 2000
- Genre: Folktronica
- Length: 43:08
- Label: Domino
- Producer: Kieran Hebden

Four Tet chronology
Dialogue (1999)	Pause (2001)	Paws (2001)

Pause is the second album by Four Tet. It was released on 28 May 2001 in the United Kingdom and on 9 October 2001 in the United States. Pause was Four Tet's first release on Domino Recording Company; his debut album, Dialogue, had been distributed by Output Recordings.

A recording of an office setting, most prominently featuring the sounds of typing on a computer keyboard, forms a recurring motif in the album; it both opens ("Glue of the World") and closes ("Hilarious Movie of the 90's") the album, and is also present in "Harmony One".

Three tracks from Pause were later released in remixed form on Four Tet's Paws EP.

== Samples ==
The acoustic guitar track "Everything Is Alright" is used as the theme music for the National Public Radio programme On Point.

The opening track "Glue of the World" is used in the background of the Six Feet Under episode "Someone Else's Eyes" (Season 2, Episode 9). This same track is used in the House, M.D. episode "Last Resort". It is played over the top of various scenes from the hospital as the hostages are being released and/or detained.

The second track, “Twenty Three,” contains a sample of Steven Halpern’s “Keynote E: Yellow,” and the third track, “Harmony One,” contains a sample of “Keynote F: Green.” Both are sampled from Halpern’s 1975 album Christening for Listening: A Soundtrack for Every Body.

The fourth track entitled "Parks" contains a sample of "After the Snow, The Fragrance" and "Sanzen (Moment of Truth)" both from the album Music for Zen Meditation by jazz clarinetist Tony Scott.

== Critical reception ==
Professional ratings
Aggregate scores
Source	Rating
Metacritic	85/100
Review scores
Source	Rating
AllMusic	4/5 stars
Dotmusic	4.5/5 stars
NME	9/10
Pitchfork	8.0/10
Playlouder	4/5 stars
Q	3/5 stars
Stylus Magazine	B+
Tiny Mix Tapes	4/5
URB	4/5 stars

At Metacritic, which assigns a normalised rating out of 100 to reviews from mainstream critics, Pause has an average score of 85, based on 13 reviews, which indicates "universal acclaim". Jason Thompson of PopMatters stated that "the songs of Pause are far more interesting and multi-layered than most of your general ambient music available on the shelves today" and called the album "a mesmerizing work." Ted Kessler of NME compared Four Tet to Boards of Canada, stating that both acts create "modern music for summer in the great outdoors, away from the urban sprawl". Similarly, Tiny Mix Tapes marked out that "you could take this release and pair it up with Boards of Canada's In a Beautiful Place Out in the Country for a back-to-back hit of sunny, frolic-in-a-sunny-field goodness", concluding that while "the album doesn't have any super highs, it also doesn't have anything even remotely close to a low." AllMusic's Thom Jurek declared that Pause "offers more proof that DJ culture still has plenty to offer" and opined that "this one's a winner from start to finish."

== Track listing ==
"Everything Is Alright"
A fifteen-second sample of "Everything Is Alright", an acoustic guitar track with prominent piano and percussion parts. 116 KB.

All tracks are written by Kieran Hebden.

No.	Title	Length
1.	"Glue of the World"	5:02
2.	"Twenty Three"	3:24
3.	"Harmony One"	1:41
4.	"Parks"	6:03
5.	"Leila Came Round and We Watched a Video"	1:39
6.	"Untangle"	4:36
7.	"Everything Is Alright"	2:31
8.	"No More Mosquitoes"	3:39
9.	"Tangle"	3:44
10.	"You Could Ruin My Day"	7:03
11.	"Hilarious Movie of the 90's"	3:29
