= Peter Rundel =

German violinist and conductor (born 1958)

Peter Rundel (born 1958 in Friedrichshafen), is a German violinist and conductor. A recipient of the Grand Prix du Disque in 1998 for his recording of Jean Barraqué's complete works, he became conductor of the Royal Philharmonic Orchestra of Flanders in 1999 and the musical director of the Wiener Taschenoper since 2000. Since 2005, he has been conductor of the Remix Ensemble in Casa da Música, Porto, Portugal.

== See also ==
- Ensemble Modern
