= First Meeting (Tethered Moon album) =

Studio album by Masabumi Kikuchi, Gary Peacock & Paul Motian
- Released: 1997
- Recorded: October 20, 1990; March 11–13, 1991
- Studio: The Studio (New York City)
- Genre: Improvised music, jazz
- Length: 66:57
- Label: Winter & Winter 910 016
- Producer: Masabumi Kikuchi

Tethered Moon chronology
First Meeting (1997)	Tethered Moon (1992)

First Meeting is an album by the group Tethered Moon, comprising pianist Masabumi Kikuchi, bassist Gary Peacock and drummer Paul Motian, recorded in late 1990 and early 1991 and released on the Winter & Winter label in 1997. The album is the first recording by the trio although it was released after several other albums.

== Reception ==
Professional ratings
Review scores
Source	Rating
Allmusic	4/5 stars

Allmusic awarded the album 4 stars. Bill Bennett wrote in JazzTimes, "Space and shadow vie with sound and light in this set of explorations by pianist Masabumi Kikuchi, bassist Gary Peacock, and drummer Paul Motian. They present themselves, to each other and to the listener, through conversations that are rife with allusions and invitations to dance".

== Track listing ==
1. "Tethered Moon" (Masabumi Kikuchi) - 19:13
2. "Misterioso" (Thelonious Monk) - 12:39
3. "Intermezzo/So in Love" (Masabumi Kikuchi, Paul Motian, Gary Peacock/Cole Porter) - 8:41
4. "First Meeting/Solar/Open Trio" (Kikuchi, Motian, Peacock/Miles Davis/Kikuchi, Motian, Peacock) - 17:24
5. "P.S." (Gary Peacock) - 9:00

== Personnel ==
- Masabumi Kikuchi - piano
- Gary Peacock - bass
- Paul Motian - drums
