= Dialogue (Four Tet album) =

Studio album by Four Tet
- Released: 1 February 1999
- Recorded: October 1997 – September 1998
- Genres: Outsider house; nu jazz
- Length: 64:35
- Label: Output
- Producer: Kieran Hebden

Four Tet chronology
Dialogue (1999)	Pause (2001)

Professional ratings
Review scores
Source	Rating
AllMusic	4.5/5 stars
NME	8/10
Pitchfork	6.3/10

Dialogue is the debut studio album by British electronic musician Kieran Hebden, released under his alias Four Tet on 1 February 1999.

== Track listing ==
1. "The Space of Two Weeks" – 5:50
2. "Chiron" – 5:23
3. "Alambradas" – 1:55
4. "3.3 Degrees from the Pole" – 6:00
5. "Misnomer" – 3:20
6. "Liquefaction" – 4:58
7. "She Scanned" – 3:12
8. "Calamine" – 7:38
9. "The Butterfly Effect" – 6:21
10. "Aying" (CD only) – 4:56
11. "Fume" (CD only) – 9:53
12. "Charm" (CD only) – 5:04
