= Tethered Moon Play Kurt Weill =

Studio album by Masabumi Kikuchi, Gary Peacock & Paul Motian
- Released: 1995
- Recorded: December 1994; Power Station, NYC
- Genre: jazz
- Length: 59:39
- Label: JMT; JMT 514 021
- Producer: Stefan Winter

Tethered Moon chronology
Triangle (1993)	Tethered Moon Play Kurt Weill (1995)	Chansons d’Édith Piaf (1999)

Tethered Moon Play Kurt Weill is an album by the group Tethered Moon, comprising pianist Masabumi Kikuchi, bassist Gary Peacock and drummer Paul Motian, recorded in late 1994 and released on the JMT label. The album features the groups interpretation of Kurt Weill's compositions.

== Reception ==
Professional ratings
Review scores
Source	Rating
Allmusic	4/5 stars
AllAboutJazz	2.5/5 stars

Allmusic awarded the album 4 stars, stating, "Kikuchi deserves accolades for not settling for another standard piano trio workout with the usual flashy runs and melody-solo-melody format. Instead, he really delves into the pieces, offering probing voicings and careful pacing, varying moods, timing, and tempo".

Chris May wrote on AllAboutJazz, "It is not without some memorable moments—most notably "Speak Low," in which Motian takes a more assertive and forward role than he does for most of the time, and on which the group does achieve a sustained burn of collective momentum and beauty. But such moments are infrequent".

== Track listing ==
All compositions by Kurt Weill and Bertolt Brecht except as indicated

1. "Alabama Song" - 9:32
2. "Barbara Song" - 6:36
3. "Moritat" - 11:14
4. "September Song" (Maxwell Anderson, Kurt Weill) - 8:37
5. "It Never Was You" (Anderson, Weill) - 1:45
6. "Trouble Man" (Anderson, Weill) - 5:00
7. "Speak Low" (Ogden Nash, Kurt Weill) - 6:52
8. "The Bilbao Song" - 4:37
9. "My Ship" (Ira Gershwin, Kurt Weill) - 5:26

== Personnel ==
- Masabumi Kikuchi - piano
- Gary Peacock - bass
- Paul Motian - drums
