= Paul Motian discography =

This is the discography of American jazz musician Paul Motian.

== As leader ==
- Conception Vessel (ECM, 1972 [1973])
- Tribute (ECM, 1974)
- Dance (ECM, 1977 [1978])
- Le voyage (ECM, 1979)
- Psalm (ECM, 1981 [1982])
- The Story of Maryam (Soul Note, 1983 [1984])
- Jack of Clubs (Soul Note, 1984 [1985])
- It Should've Happened a Long Time Ago (ECM, 1984 [1985])
- Misterioso (Soul Note, 1986 [1987])
- One Time Out (Soul Note, 1987 [1989])
- Monk in Motian (JMT, 1988 [1989])
- On Broadway Volume 1 (JMT, 1988 [1989])
- On Broadway Volume 2 (JMT, 1989)
- Bill Evans (JMT, 1990)
- Motian in Tokyo (Bamboo, 1991)
- On Broadway Volume 3 (JMT, 1991 [1993])
- Paul Motian and the Electric Bebop Band (JMT, 1992 [1993])
- Trioism (JMT, 1993 [1994])
- Reincarnation of a Love Bird (JMT, 1994)
- At the Village Vanguard (JMT, 1995)
- Sound of Love (Winter & Winter, 1995 [1997])
- Flight of the Blue Jay (Winter & Winter, 1996 [1997])
- Trio 2000 + One (Winter & Winter, 1997 [1998])
- Play Monk and Powell (Winter & Winter, 1998 [1999])
- Europe (Winter & Winter, 2000 [2001])
- Holiday for Strings (Winter & Winter, 2001 [2002])
- I Have the Room Above Her (ECM, 2004 [2005])
- Garden of Eden (ECM, 2004 [2007])
- On Broadway Vol. 4 or The Paradox of Continuity (Winter & Winter, 2005)
- Time and Time Again (ECM, 2006)
- Live at the Village Vanguard (Winter & Winter, 2006 [2007])
- Live at the Village Vanguard Vol. II (Winter & Winter, 2006 [2008])
- Live at the Village Vanguard Vol. III (Winter & Winter, 2006 [2010])
- On Broadway Volume 5 (Winter & Winter, 2009)
- Lost in a Dream (ECM, 2010)
- The Windmills of Your Mind (Winter & Winter, 2011)

Compilations

- Selected Recordings (ECM, 2004)

Box Sets

- Paul Motian - The Complete Remastered Recordings On Black Saint & Soul Note (Compr. the six albums for Soul Note, CAM Jazz, 2010)
- Paul Motian on Broadway Vol. 1, 2, 3, 4, 5 (Rec. 1988–2008, Winter & Winter, 2012)
- Old & New Masters Edition: Paul Motian (Six albums rec. 1972–1984, ECM, 2013)

With Tethered Moon (Trio with Masabumi Kikuchi and Gary Peacock)

- First Meeting (Winter & Winter, 1990–91, [1997])
- Tethered Moon (King/Paddle Wheel, 1991 [1992]; Evidence, 1993)
- Triangle (King/Paddle Wheel, 1991 [1992])
- Tethered Moon Play Kurt Weill (JMT, 1994 [1995]; reissued on Winter & Winter, 2005)
- Plays Jimi Hendrix+ (Polydor/Media Rings, 1997 [1998])
- Chansons d’Édith Piaf (Winter & Winter, 1999 [1999])
- Experiencing Tosca (Winter & Winter, 2002 [2004])

== As sideman ==
With Michael Adkins

- Rotator (Hathut Records|HatHut), 2008) with Russ Lossing and John Hébert
- Flaneur (Hathut Records|HatHut], recorded 2008, released 2018) with Russ Lossing and Larry Grenadier

With Geri Allen and Charlie Haden

- Etudes (Soul Note, 1987); Haden and Motian credited ahead of Allen
- In the Year of the Dragon (JMT, 1989)
- Segments (DIW, 1989)
- The Montreal Tapes: with Geri Allen and Paul Motian (Verve, 1989 [1997]); issued under Haden's name
- Live at the Village Vanguard (DIW, 1991)

With Mose Allison

- I Love the Life I Live (Columbia, 1960)
- Wild Man on the Loose (Atlantic, 1965)
- The Earth Wants You (Blue Note, 1993)
- Gimcracks and Gewgaws (Blue Note, 1997)

With Derek Bailey

- Duo in Concert (Frozen Reeds, 2023)

With Tim Berne

- Songs and Rituals in Real Time (Empire, 1982; reissue by Screwgun, 1998) with Mack Goldsbury and Ed Schuller
- The Ancestors (Soul Note, 1982) with Ray Anderson, Mack Goldsbury, C. Herb Robertson and Ed Schuller
- Mutant Variations (Soul Note, 1984) with C. Herb Robertson and Ed Schuller

With Samuel Blaser

- Consort in Motion (Kind of Blue, 2011) with Russ Lossing and Thomas Morgan
- Live at Cornelia Street Café (Blaser Music, 2021) with Russ Lossing and Eivind Opsvik

With Carla Bley

- Escalator Over The Hill (JCOA, 1971)

With Paul Bley

- Turns (Savoy, 1964) with John Gilmore and Gary Peacock (also in part on Improvising Artists’ Turning Point, 1975)
- Paul Bley with Gary Peacock (ECM, 1970)
- Fragments (ECM, 1986) with Bill Frisell and John Surman
- Notes (Soul Note, 1987)
- The Paul Bley Quartet (ECM, 1987) with Bill Frisell and John Surman
- Memoirs (Soul Note, 1990) with Charlie Haden
- Zen Palace (Transheart, 1993) with Steve Swallow
- Not Two, Not One (ECM, 1998) with Gary Peacock

With Salvatore Bonafede

- Plays (Ken Music, 1991) with Marc Johnson
- For the Time Being (CAM Jazz, 2006) with Joe Lovano, Michele Rabbia, Mark Dresser and Adam Rogers

With Jakob Bro

- Balladeering (Loveland, 2009) with Bill Frisell, Lee Konitz and Ben Street

With Bob Brookmeyer

- Jazz Is a Kick (Mercury, 1960)

With Guillaume de Chassy and Daniel Yvinec

- Songs from the Last Century (Bee Jazz, 2009) with Marc Murphy

With Anders Christensen

- Dear Someone (Stunt, 2010) with Aaron Parks

With Marc Copland

- New York Trio Recordings Vol.2: Voices (Pirouet, 2007) with Gary Peacock

With Chick Corea and Eddie Gómez

- Further Explorations (Universal Japan, 2011; international release by Concord Jazz, 2012)

With Eddie Costa

- Eddie Costa Quintet (Interlude, 1957)
- Guys and Dolls Like Vibes (Coral/Verve, 1958) with Bill Evans, Wendell Marshall
- The House of Blue Lights (Dot, 1959) with Wendell Marshall

With Marilyn Crispell

- Live in Zurich (Leo, 1990)
- Nothing Ever Was, Anyway: Music of Annette Peacock (ECM, 1997)
- Amaryllis (ECM, 2000)
- Storyteller (ECM, 2003)

With Furio Di Castri

- Unknown Voyage (A Tempo, 1988) with Joe Lovano

With Jakob Dinesen

- Around (Stunt, 2001) with Kurt Rosenwinkel
- Dino (Stunt, 2009) with Anders Christensen

With Bill Evans

- New Jazz Conceptions (Riverside, 1957)
- Portrait in Jazz (Riverside, 1959)
- Explorations (Riverside, 1961)
- Sunday at the Village Vanguard (Riverside, 1961)
- Waltz for Debby (Riverside, 1962)
- How My Heart Sings! (Riverside, 1962)
- Moon Beams (Riverside, 1962)
- Nirvana with Herbie Mann (Atlantic, 1962)
- Trio 64 (Verve, 1963)

With Pierre Favre

- Singing Drums (ECM, 1984)

With Anat Fort

- A Long Story (ECM, 2004 [2007])

With Bill Frisell

- Rambler (ECM, 1985)
- Bill Frisell, Ron Carter, Paul Motian (Nonesuch, 2006)
- Bill Frisell, Ron Carter, Paul Motian EP (Nonesuch, 2006) - Download exclusive

With Larry Goldings

- Awareness (Warner Bros, 1997) with Larry Grenadier

With Alexandra Grimal

- Owls Talk (Aparte/Harmonia Mundi, 2012) with Lee Konitz and Gary Peacock

With Charlie Haden

- Liberation Music Orchestra (Impulse!, 1969)
- Closeness (Horizon/Verve, 1976)
- The Ballad of the Fallen (ECM, 1982)
- The Private Collection (Naim, 1987-88 [2000])
- The Montreal Tapes: with Gonzalo Rubalcaba and Paul Motian (Verve, 1989 [1997])
- The Montreal Tapes: with Paul Bley and Paul Motian (Verve, 1989 [1994])
- The Montreal Tapes: Liberation Music Orchestra (Verve, 1989 [1997])
- Dream Keeper (Blue Note, 1989)

With Yuri Honing

- Seven (Jazz in Motion, 2001) with Paul Bley and Gary Peacock

With Keith Jarrett

- Life Between the Exit Signs (Vortex, 1967)
- Somewhere Before (Atlantic, 1968)
- The Mourning of a Star (Atlantic, 1971)
- El Juicio (The Judgement) (Atlantic, 1971)
- Birth (Atlantic, 1971)
- Expectations (Columbia, 1972)
- Hamburg '72 (ECM, 1972 [2014])
- Fort Yawuh (Impulse!, 1973)
- Treasure Island (Impulse!, 1974)
- Back Hand (Impulse!, 1974)
- Death and the Flower (Impulse!, 1974)
- Mysteries (Impulse!, 1975)
- Shades (Impulse!, 1975)
- Bop-Be (Impulse!, 1976)
- The Survivors' Suite (ECM, 1976)
- Byablue (Impulse!, 1977)
- Eyes of the Heart (ECM, 1979)
- At the Deer Head Inn (ECM, 1992) with Gary Peacock

With Masabumi Kikuchi (see also Tethered Moon)

- Sunrise (ECM, 2012) with Thomas Morgan

With Frank Kimbrough

- Play (Palmetto, 2006) with Masa Kamaguchi

With Lee Konitz (and Warne Marsh)

- Live at the Half Note (Verve, 1959 [1994]); Warne Marsh's solos from these recordings were issued as The Art of Improvising (Revelation, 1959 [1974})

With Lee Konitz, Brad Mehldau and Charlie Haden

- Live at Birdland (ECM, 2009)

With Lee Konitz and Steve Swallow

- Three Guys (Enja, 1999)

With Rudy Linka

- Songs with Larry Grenadier

With Russ Lossing

- Dreamer (Double Time, 2000)
- As It Grows (HatHut, 2004)

With Joe Lovano

- Village Rhythm (Soul Note, 1988) with Kenny Werner, Tom Harrell and Marc Johnson
- Worlds (Label Bleu, 1989; reissued by Evidence Music, 1995) with Bill Frisell, Tim Hagens, Gary Valente, Judi Silvano, Henri Texier
- I'm All For You (Blue Note, 2004) with Hank Jones and George Mraz
- Joyous Encounter (Blue Note, 2005) with Hank Jones and George Mraz

With Warne Marsh

- Warne Marsh (Atlantic, 1958)

With Bill McHenry

- Bill McHenry Quartet Featuring Paul Motian (Fresh Sound, 2002)
- Roses (Sunny Side, 2007)
- Ghosts of the Sun (Sunny Side, 2011)

With Helen Merrill

- You and the Night and the Music (Verve, 1998)

With Sam Most

- Most Plays Monk Bird & Miles (Bethlehem (US), Parlophone (UK), 1958)

With Simon Nabatov

- Circle the Line (GM, 1986) and Ed Schuller, Arto Tuncboyaci

With Stéphan Oliva and Bruno Chevillon

- Fantasm - The Music of Paul Motian (BMG France/RCA Victor, 2000)
- Intérieur nuit (Night Bird, 2002)

With John Patitucci

- One More Angel (Concord, 1997)

With Enrico Pieranunzi

- Untold Story (IDA, 1993; reissue EGEA, 2006) with Marc Johnson
- Flux and Change (Soul Note, 1995)
- The Night Gone By (Alfa Jazz, 1996) with Marc Johnson
- Fellini Jazz (CAM Jazz, 2003) with Kenny Wheeler, Chris Potter and Charlie Haden
- Doorways (CAM Jazz, 2004) with Chris Potter
- Special Encounter (CAM Jazz, 2005) with Charlie Haden
- New York Reflections: Live at Birdland (CAM Jazz, 2012) with Steve Swallow
- Live at the Village Vanguard (CAM Jazz, 2013) with Marc Johnson

With Augusto Pirodda

- No Comment (Jazzwerkstatt, 2011) with Gary Peacock

With Enrico Rava

- Tati (ECM, 2004)
- New York Days (ECM, 2008)

With Gonzalo Rubalcaba

- Discovery: Live at Montreux (Somethin' Else/Blue Note, 1991) with Charlie Haden

With Roswell Rudd

- Blown Bone (Philips, 1979)

With Jacob Sacks and Eivind Opsvik

- Two Miles a Day (Yeah Yeah, 2005) with Mat Maneri

With Saheb Sarbib

- Seasons (Soul Note, 1982) with Mark Whitecage and Mel Ellison

With Zoot Sims

- Jazz Alive! A Night at the Half Note (United Artists, 1959) with Al Cohn and Phil Woods

With Martial Solal

- At Newport '63 (RCA Victor, 1963)
- Just Friends (Dreyfus, 1997) with Gary Peacock
- Balade du 10 Mars (Soul Note, 1999) with Marc Johnson

With Martin Speake

- Change of Heart (ECM, 2002) with Bobo Stenson and Mick Hutton

With Bobo Stenson

- Goodbye (ECM, 2005) with Anders Jormin

With Henri Texier

- Respect (Label Bleu, 1997) with Bob Brookmeyer, Lee Konitz and Steve Swallow

With Pietro Tonolo

- Portrait of Duke (Label Bleu, 2000) with Gil Goldstein and Steve Swallow
- Your Songs: The Music of Elton John (ObliqSound, 2007) with Gil Goldstein and Steve Swallow

With Eric Watson and Ed Schuller

- Conspiracy (Decca Records France, 1982)
