= On Broadway =

On Broadway may refer to:

== Film, television, and radio ==
- On Broadway (film), a 2007 American film directed by Dave McLaughlin
- "On Broadway" (Smash), a television episode
- On Broadway (Sirius XM), a satellite radio channel

== Music ==
- "On Broadway" (song), by the Drifters, 1963; covered by George Benson, 1978
- On Broadway (David Campbell album), 2010
- On Broadway (Four Tops album), 1967
- On Broadway (Reuben Wilson album), 1968
- On Broadway (Vol. 1), an album by the Ten Tenors, 2014
- On Broadway: Act One – October 28th, 1987, an album by the Jerry Garcia Band and the Jerry Garcia Acoustic Band
- A series of five albums by Paul Motian:
  - On Broadway Volume 1, 1989
  - On Broadway Volume 2, 1989
  - On Broadway Volume 3, 1993
  - On Broadway Vol. 4 or The Paradox of Continuity, 2006
  - On Broadway Volume 5, 2009
- King Crimson on Broadway, an album by King Crimson, 1999
- On Broadway, an album by Roger Whittaker, 1995
- On Broadway, a soundtrack album from the television special G.I.T. on Broadway by Diana Ross & the Supremes and the Temptations, 1969
- Louis Prima & Keely Smith on Broadway, an album by Louis Prima and Keely Smith, 1958
- Louis Prima on Broadway, an album by Louis Prima, 1967

== Other uses ==
- On Broadway, Inc., an American non-profit organization in Green Bay, Wisconsin, US
- On Broadway, a 1990 edition of Damon Runyon stories

== See also ==
- Broadway theatre, theatrical performances associated with Broadway, New York City
