= Lost in a Dream =

Lost in a Dream may refer to:

- Lost in a Dream (REO Speedwagon album)
- Lost in a Dream (Paul Motian album)
