= Reincarnation of a Love Bird =

Studio album by Paul Motian
- Released: 1994
- Recorded: June 1994
- Genre: Jazz
- Length: 48:23
- Label: JMT
- Producer: Stefan F. Winter

Paul Motian chronology
Trioism (1993)	Reincarnation of a Love Bird (1994)	Sound of Love (1995)

Reincarnation of a Love Bird is a 1994 album of mostly bebop jazz standards led by Paul Motian and named after the included tune by Charles Mingus. The band features Motian with saxophonists Chris Potter and Chris Cheek, guitarists Wolfgang Muthspiel and Kurt Rosenwinkel, bass guitarist Steve Swallow and percussionist Don Alias. The credited "Electric Bebop Band" is a different group of musicians than the previous Electric Bebop Band release.

The album follows the 1992 release Paul Motian and the Electric Bebop Band. It was released on the German label JMT and later re-released on the Winter & Winter label in 2005.

== Reception ==
The AllMusic review by Rick Anderson stated: "The element of surprise that charged the proceedings on the debut is missing this time, but this is still a very fine album overall".

The Jazz Journal UK review said: "I found this disc a little disappointing. [...] some minor complexity for its own sake. But both Potter and Cheek are excellent, [...] with distinctive but complementary styles and ideas. [...] Swallow swings superbly, [...], and Motian drums up delightful musical storms, especially on 2 Bass and Be-Bop."

Professional ratings
Review scores
Source	Rating
AllMusic	4/5 stars
The Penguin Guide to Jazz Recordings	3.5/4 stars

== Track listing ==
1. "Split Decision" (Paul Motian) - 5:40
2. "Half-Nelson" (Miles Davis) - 3:53
3. "Ask Me Now" (Thelonious Monk) - 3:44
4. "Reincarnation of a Love Bird" (Charles Mingus) - 6:32
5. "Skippy" (Monk) - 3:40
6. "2 Bass Hit" (Dizzy Gillespie, John Lewis) - 4:10
7. Waseenonet" (Wolfgang Muthspiel) - 7:02
8. "Ornithology" (Benny Harris, Charlie Parker) - 4:31
9. "'Round Midnight" (Monk) - 6:57
10. "Be-Bop" (Gillespie) - 4:01
11. "Split Decision" (Motian) - 3:39

- Recorded at RPM Recording Studios in New York City in June 1994

== Personnel ==
- Paul Motian - drums
- Chris Potter - alto saxophone (left channel)
- Chris Cheek - tenor saxophone (right channel)
- Wolfgang Muthspiel - electric guitar (right channel)
- Kurt Rosenwinkel - electric guitar (left channel)
- Steve Swallow - electric bass
- Don Alias - percussion
