= On Broadway Volume 5 =

Studio album by Paul Motian
- Released: 24 April 2009
- Recorded: June 2008
- Genre: Jazz
- Length: 56:42
- Label: Winter & Winter
- Producer: Stefan Winter

Paul Motian chronology
| Live at the Village Vanguard Vol. III (2006) | On Broadway Volume 5 (2009) | Lost in a Dream (2009) |

On Broadway Volume 5 is an album by Paul Motian and the Trio 2000 + Two released on the German Winter & Winter label in 2009. The album follows on from the first four volumes of Motian's On Broadway Series featuring features performances of Broadway show tunes.

== Reception ==
The Allmusic review by Alex Henderson awarded the album 4½ stars, stating, "In a sense, On Broadway is an ironic title for this series because Motian certainly doesn't perform standards the way they would be performed in a Broadway theatrical production; he performs them like someone who is hell-bent for hardcore jazz. On Broadway, Vol. 5 is a welcome addition to the series".

Professional ratings
Review scores
| Source | Rating |
|---|---|
| Allmusic | 4.5/5 stars |
| Tom Hull | A− |

== Track listing ==
1. "Morrock" (Paul Motian) - 6:38
2. "Something I Dreamed Last Night" (Sammy Fain) - 9:16
3. "Just a Gigolo" (Leonello Casucci) - 6:43
4. "I See Your Face Before Me" (Howard Dietz, Arthur Schwartz) - 12:30
5. "A Lovely Way to Spend an Evening" (Harold Adamson, Jimmy McHugh) - 7:29
6. "Midnight Sun" (Sonny Burke, Lionel Hampton) - 6:57
7. "Sue Me" (Frank Loesser) - 7:06

== Personnel ==
- Paul Motian - drums
- Loren Stillman - alto saxophone
- Michaël Attias - alto and baritone saxophone
- Masabumi Kikuchi - piano
- Thomas Morgan - bass
