= It Should've Happened a Long Time Ago =

1985 studio album by Paul Motian

Studio album by Paul Motian
- Released: 1 March 1985
- Recorded: July 1984
- Studio: Tonstudio Bauer; Ludwigsburg, West Germany
- Genre: Avant-garde jazz, free jazz, contemporary jazz
- Length: 39:40
- Label: ECM 1283
- Producer: Manfred Eicher

Paul Motian chronology
Jack of Clubs (1985)	It Should've Happened a Long Time Ago (1985)	Misterioso (1987)

It Should've Happened a Long Time Ago is an album by the Paul Motian Trio recorded in July 1984 and released on ECM March the following year. The trio features guitarist Bill Frisell and tenor saxophonist Joe Lovano—the three had previously recorded together on Psalm (1982), The Story of Maryam (1984), and Jack of Clubs (1985) in Motian's quintet.

== Reception ==
The AllMusic review by Thom Jurek stated: "This is one of the finest recordings that came from ECM in the '80s. Paul Bley led another, which featured Motian and Frisell—as well as John Surman. This set is made of the kind of music that made Manfred Eicher's ECM such a force to be reckoned with. It placed three musicians in a context that was comfortable enough to make them want to sing to one another."

Professional ratings
Review scores
Source	Rating
AllMusic	4.5/5 stars
Tom Hull	B+
The Penguin Guide to Jazz Recordings	3.5/4 stars

== Track listing ==
All compositions by Paul Motian

1. "It Should've Happened a Long Time Ago" - 6:06
2. "Fiasco" - 7:49
3. "Conception Vessel" - 4:31
4. "Introduction" - 3:05
5. "India" - 7:26
6. "In the Year of the Dragon" - 5:56
7. "Two Women from Padua" - 5:13

== Personnel ==
=== Paul Motian Trio ===
- Paul Motian – drums
- Bill Frisell – guitar
- Joe Lovano – tenor saxophone
