= A Long Story =

A Long Story may refer to:

- A Long Story (Anat Fort album)
- A Long Story (Eliane Elias album)
