= Abbey Rader =

American avant-garde jazz drummer (1943–2025)

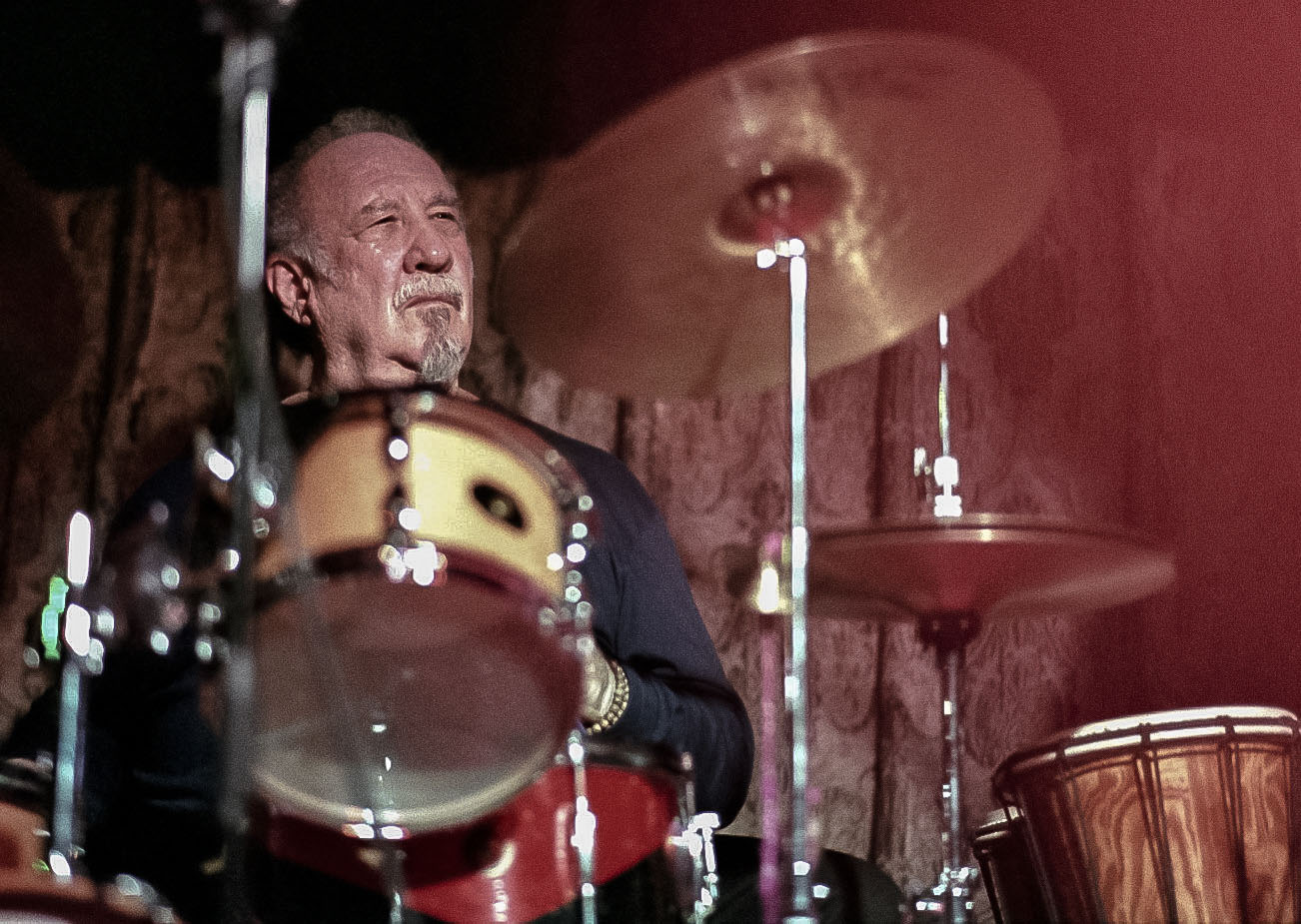
- Rader performing 2012

Background information
- Born: October 14, 1943; New Brunswick, New Jersey, U.S.
- Died: September 29, 2025 (aged 81)
- Genres: Avant-garde jazz, free jazz, spiritual
- Occupation: Musician
- Instrument: Drums
- Years active: 1961–2025
- Label: Abray
- Website: www.abbeyrader.com

Abbey Rader (October 14, 1943 – September 29, 2025) was an American avant-garde jazz drummer. Throughout his childhood and early career, he worked in New York City where loft jazz, bebop, and free jazz influenced him. He played and taught across Europe in the 1970s and 1980s and then returned to North America to create music that combines free jazz, martial arts, and Buddhism. He has recorded over twenty-five albums as a leader and has worked with Dave Liebman, John Handy, Billy Bang, Dr. L. Subramaniam, and Mal Waldron in a career spanning over four decades.

Rader's album First Gathering was named one of the Best of 2015. It's the first album from his West Coast Quartet with Peter Kuhn, Kyle Motl and Drew Ceccato. His album, Reunion, was released on July 23, 2016 and is a recording of his live October 31, 2012 performance at PAX: Performing Arts Exchange in Miami, Florida. This was an improvised performance including Kidd Jordan, John McMinn, Kyle Motl, and Noah Brandmark.

The Message, was released in August 2014 and is a recording of his live January 2014 radio performance on Evenin' Jazz with the Real Tracy Fields at WLRN Miami. The Message was named one of the Best of 2014 by Avant Music News.

Before this, his quartet featuring John McMinn, Noah Brandmark and Kyle Motl released their second recording, Reach for the Skies a runner-up for Album of Year in 2013. Their first album, Live at PAX, was named one of the Best of 2012.

== Life and career ==
=== Early education ===
Abbey Rader was born in New Brunswick, New Jersey, and raised in the Bronx where he moved when he was six months old. His introduction to drumming began early, as his father was a band leader and drummer. Rader started playing traditional jazz gigs in the early 1960s, typically piano-bass-drum or saxophone-organ-drum trios, which exposed him to a variety of musicians that subtly influenced his style.

His education went beyond music into spirituality. Rader met drummer Clarence "Scoby" Strohman while playing opposite the Marin Rivers trio. Strohman introduced Rader to books like Light on the Path by Mabel Collins and Paramahansa Yogananda's The Autobiography of a Yogi, which helped begin Rader's spiritual journey. Rader recalled an anecdote that touched his confidence as well. "My music reading skills were not very good, but Scoby had lots of faith in me. He stood behind me on the bandstand one night as I started to play acts with lots of music to read. Scoby said, "That's not a problem for you. That's nothing for you." I played remarkably well that night. I said to Scoby, "Did you see those difficult charts I read?", and he said he couldn't read a note. So I learned something else about the spiritual power and the power of the mind."

Rader recalled that hearing John Coltrane's quartet with Elvin Jones at the Half Note Club was a moment that changed his musical expression to improvisation and searching for the union between mind, spirit, and body.

=== Living in Europe ===
The free jazz in style at the time influenced Rader. He started playing in the mid-70s loft jazz movement, which led him to create his first album as a band leader, a recording entitled The Thing. He decided that to continue to play his free style of music, moving to Europe would provide opportunities not available in the U.S. With nothing but a drum set and $500, he traveled to London and later published The Thing for Atmosphere Records while in Paris.

From France, he moved to Germany, initially playing with Bob Lenox in Lenox's rock and funk pieces. His desire to continue playing free jazz brought Rader to drumming with George Bishop in improvised duet performances. In the 1980s, he worked with alto saxophonist, John Handy; violinist, L. Subramaniam; and bassist, Sigi Busch. Handy encouraged Rader to play powerfully, asking him to play drum solos behind his saxophone as they toured Europe. Later, Rader spent five years in the Gunter Hampel Big Band that included Jeanne Lee and Marion Brown. Rader's next lesson came from playing with Mal Waldron and Marc Levin, a NYC friend, on trumpet. As Rader described, Mal often helped Rader put life's tribulations in perspective and encouraged him to play freely, to transform the energy he might be feeling by channeling it into his drumming.

During this time, Rader started his Abbey Rader's Right Time band. He recorded several times with this band and established record label Abray Productions. He also became a touring clinician for Sonor and Tosco (later Sabian, see: UFIP) cymbals, and taught at multiple universities in Germany. During his teaching, he frequently featured improvisational artists he worked with to teach how to improvise on music tracks a band may play.

=== Returning to America ===
Rader met his wife and raised two sons in Germany, and then moved to South Florida in 1989. In the 1990s and 2000s he recorded with David Liebman, putting out four CDs together. He then spent nearly five years with violinist Billy Bang in the Jazz Doctors. In this group, Rader replaced recently deceased Dennis Charles; other band members included Frank Lowe on saxophone and bass player Ed Schuller. While doing a sound check for the Vision Festival in memory of Dennis Charles, Rader had the fortune of meeting Billy Higgins. Higgins was getting the stage ready for a drum choir and encouraged Rader to get his drum set, after which they began an impromptu drum performance. Later, Rader recorded "One for Jazz" with Bang and Lowe in Bedford-Stuyvesant, Brooklyn, NY. He spent much of his time touring the East Coast of the U.S., including Charleston, South Carolina, Atlanta, Georgia, and the Zeitgeist Art Center in New Orleans, Louisiana.

Rader later performed with John McMinn, Noah Brandmark, Kyle Motl and Kidd Jordan.

These experiences, and his later performances, continued to influence Abbey Rader's style of music. He drew on his traditional jazz roots to create a "circular feeling...[with] a lot of polyrythmn between cymbals, bass drum, and snare drum", which he employed to play with other musicians to free himself from the original way of drumming and ultimately himself.

Rader recorded and performed with Laurindo Almeida, Billy Bang, George Bishop, Marion Brown, Cameron Brown, Sigi Busch, Marty Cook, Roy Cumming, Herman Foster, Joe Gallivan, Philip Gelb, Rainer Glas, Mack Goldsbury, Gunter Hampel, John Handy, Luc Houtkamp, Leonard Jones, Kidd Jordan, Peter Kuhn, Jeanne Lee, Bob Lenox, Marc Levin, David Liebman, Frank Lowe, Keshavan Maslak, Ron McClure, Kim Mikkelson, Peck Morrison, Peter Ponzol, Ed Schuller, Ken Simon, Dr. L. Subramaniam, Mal Waldron, David Wertman, Joerg Widmoser, Leszek Zadlo and Joe Zeytoonian.

=== Death ===
Rader died on September 29, 2025, at the age of 81.

== Spiritual influence ==
In 1975, Rader met Reverend Sheng-yen, who would become his lifetime teacher and recurring influence in all aspects of his life. Through his Buddhist studies under Sheng-yen, Rader received Dharma name Guo Hsing, meaning "fruit of good fortune". Rader's practice involved many weeklong retreats at the Temple of Enlightenment in Queens, New York, and as one of 130 on November 19, 2006 at Dharma Drum Retreat Center, both founded by Sheng-yen. His studies included Ch'an meditation that is focused on clearing the mind and embracing impermanence.

Rader incorporated these practices in his style of improvised music. As explained by Rader, in an Avant Music News interview, "in music, if you have the technique well built...and want to improvise freely, you must empty your mind to...interplay spontaneously with the other musicians and allow the music to come through you. This to me is the correlation between the freer music and the Buddhist empty mind practice."

== Martial arts influence ==
In New York City's East Village in 1964, Rader started studying Nisei Goju Ryu, an Okinawan form of Karate at the University of the Streets. His teachers were grandmaster Frank Ruiz and John Giordano. Lessons included vow making, bowing, and traditional meditation practices to focus the mind. By the early 1970s, Rader achieved a black-belt level and started studying under Rick "The Fireman" Joslin, a frequent performer at The World of Martial Arts show put on by Aaron Banks. His training then took on a "street-style" of self-defense without the use of traditional uniforms or colored-belt achievements.

In the early 2000s, Rader started practicing Qigong and Taiji under the tutelage of Wei Zhong Foo and Dororthy Chong. He then continued his studies at the International Buddhist Progress Society Temple under Robert Cheng. Rader later took over teaching at this Temple after Cheng departed.

Rader's next teacher was Chen Ji Fan and after years under his instruction and at his encouragement, Rader began teaching Yang-style tai chi, standing (zhan zhuang) meditation, and sitting meditation, starting his Fearless Mind School. Rader stated that he was inspired by these practices to enter a state of "empty mind", which allowed him to embrace spontaneity in life and music.

== Teaching ==
Rader taught the first jazz drumming course at several universities in Germany during the 1980s. His teaching concentrated on rudiments to enable students to develop the facility to independently move their hands and feet. Each class had at least two drum sets where Rader and the students would play together, trading fours and eights, learning about song form and melodic playing. Rader exposed students to other forms of music (like blues and his experience with jazz and lounge bands), often introducing them to saxophone or trumpet players he's worked with, to expand their musical knowledge and fidelity.

He taught at Hochschule für Musik Detmold, Musikschule Einbeck, PH Göttingen, and TU Braunschweig.

== Discography ==
=== As leader ===
- The Thing (IRI/Atmosphere, 1979)
- European Childbirth (Sweet Dragon, 1981)
- Songs of Street and Spirit with Marc Levin (Sweet Dragon, 1982)
- Live at the Holstebro Jazzfestival Holstebro, Denmark (Abray, 1983)
- The Last Retreat with Ken Simon (Abray, 1983)
- Brush Off (Magic Cube, 1987)
- Southern Arrival with Harmonic Motion (Third Stream Music, 1995)
- Suburban Utopic with Keshavan Maslak, (Abray, 1995)
- Mystic Journey with Philip Gelb (Abray, 1997)
- Inner Voices with Dave Liebman (Abray, 1997)
- The Spirit Inside Us with Rader Schwarz Group (Timbre, 1998)
- Echoes with Billy Bang (Abray, 1999)
- The Ballistics of Yin and Yang with Davey Williams (Abray, 1999)
- Inner Voices Live with Dave Liebman (Abray, 2000)
- Open Friends with Noah Brandmark (Abray, 2001)
- Space Between Worlds with Florida Free World Ensemble (Hum Ha, 2002)
- Cosmos with Dave Liebman (Cadence, 2003)
- Suite Rhythm (Abray, 2004)
- Live at PAX (Abray, 2011)
- Reach for the Skies (Abray, 2013)
- The Message (Abray, 2014)
- First Gathering (Abray, 2015)
- Reunion with Kidd Jordan (Abray, 2016)
- Phenobarbital Sessions with John McMinn (Abray, 2017)
- Second Gathering (Abray, 2018)

=== As sideman ===
- Bob Lenox, Call On Blue (Omnibus, 1979)
- Bob Lenox, Analog Telcom (Stockfisch, 1982)
- Bob Lenox, Digital (Stockfisch, 1982)
- Frank Lowe & Billy Bang, One for Jazz (No More, 2001)

== Sources ==
- Preira, Matt (August 10, 2011). "Free-Jazz Gurus Abbey Rader and John McMinn Get Wild at PAX August 24". Miami New Times.
- Minsker, Mark (April 25, 2011). "Special Feature: Remembering a Moment in D.C with the Late Billy Bang, a Fiery Jazz Violin Master". CapitalBop.com.
- Weinberg, Bob (January 2, 2002). "In the Moment". City Link.
- Rader, Abbey (2000). "Playing Free". Modern Drummer. 24 (7–12): 118. Abbey Rader on playing improvised music
- Bettine, Michael (September 1999). "Abbey Rader: Freemaster". Modern Drummer.
- Jazzpodium. June 1999.
- "Rader-Schwartz Interview". Jazzthing. April 1999.
- Die Welt. February 25, 1999.
- Berliner Morgenpost. February 23, 1999.
- Weinberg, Bob (September 1997). "And the Beat Goes On". City Link.
- New Times Magazine. February 1993.
- "Billboard Limited". Jazz Journal. 1992.
- Jazzpodium. July 1982.
- Radio Station Appearances and Interviews: WPRK/FM, Orlando – November 23, 1997; WLRN Radio, Miami – October, 1997; KDSU/FM, North Dakota State University, Fargo, North Dakota – September, 1997; WUSB/FM, SUNY Stonybrook, New York – September 11, 1997
