= Sound of Love (album) =

Live album by Paul Motian
- Released: 25 April 1997
- Recorded: June 7–10, 1995
- Genre: Jazz
- Length: 58:56
- Label: JMT
- Producer: Stefan F. Winter

Paul Motian chronology
Reincarnation of a Love Bird (1994)	Sound of Love (1997)	At the Village Vanguard (1995)

Sound of Love is a live album by jazz drummer Paul Motian recorded at the Village Vanguard in 1995 and on the Winter & Winter label in 1997. It features Motian in his longtime trio with guitarist Bill Frisell and tenor saxophonist Joe Lovano.

== Reception ==
The Penguin Guide to Jazz selected this album as part of its suggested Core Collection.

The AllMusic review by Stephen Cook awarded the album 4½ stars, calling it "a stellar set of jazz covers and Motian originals" and stating: "As the premium sound quality of the recording makes clear, this trio had an almost telepathic rapport on stage, inspiring each other in both ensemble playing and solo flights. This kind of hand-in-glove chemistry is certainly due in part to the group's many stints on the road, but also comes from the individual player's complimentary [sic] styles".

Professional ratings
Review scores
Source	Rating
The Penguin Guide to Jazz	4/4 stars
AllMusic	4.5/5 stars
Tom Hull	A−

== Track listing ==
All compositions by Paul Motian except as indicated

1. "Misterioso" (Thelonious Monk) - 13:24
2. "Duke Ellington's Sound of Love" (Charles Mingus) - 9:09
3. "Mumbo Jumbo" - 7:29
4. "Once Around the Park" - 6:48
5. "Good Morning Heartache" (Irene Higginbotham, Ervin Drake, Dan Fisher) - 8:48
6. "Epistrophy" (Kenny Clarke, Monk) - 7:10
7. "Play" - 6:08

- Recorded at the Village Vanguard in New York City on June 7–10, 1995

== Personnel ==
- Paul Motian - drums
- Bill Frisell - electric guitar
- Joe Lovano - tenor saxophone
