= Pepper's Pow Wow =

Studio album by Jim Pepper
- Released: 1971
- Recorded: January 7, 1971; New York City
- Genre: Crossover Jazz/Native American music
- Length: 38:42
- Label: Embryo; SD 731
- Producer: Daniel Weiss

Jim Pepper chronology
Pepper's Pow Wow (1971)	Comin' and Goin' (1984)

Pepper's Pow Wow is the debut album led by Native American saxophonist and composer Jim Pepper recorded in 1971 and first released on Herbie Mann's Embryo label.

== Reception ==
Professional ratings
Review scores
Source	Rating
Allmusic	4/5 stars

The Allmusic site awarded the album 4 stars stating "while Pepper's Pow Wow is not strictly a jazz record, nor is it a folk record or a rock record, it is something far greater than merely the sum of those things".

== Track listing ==
All compositions by Gilbert Pepper except as indicated

1. "Witchitai-To (Chant) / Witchitai-To (Song)" (Traditional/Jim Pepper) – 7:17
2. "Squaw Song" – 3:50
3. "Rock Stomp Indian Style" – 2:07
4. "Senecas (As Long as the Grass Shall Grow)" (Peter La Farge) – 5:48
5. "Ya Na Ho" – 5:42
6. "Slow War Dance" – 1:51
7. "Nommie-Nommie (When the Roll Is Called Up Yonder)" (Traditional) – 2:37
8. "Newly-Weds Song" – 3:01
9. "Fast War Dance/Now War Dance" (Gilbert Pepper/Billy Cobham, Chuck Rainey, Jim Pepper, Larry Coryell, Tom Grant) – 2:24
10. "Drums" (La Farge) – 4:20

== Personnel ==
- Jim Pepper – tenor saxophone, soprano saxophone, drums, bells, rattles, shakers, vocals
- Ravie Pepper – flute, bamboo flute, shakers, vocals
- Tom Grant – piano, shakers, vocals
- Larry Coryell – guitar
- Jerry Jemmott, Chuck Rainey – electric bass
- Billy Cobham, Spider Rice – drums
- Gib Pepper – drums, bells, rattles, shakers, vocals, arranger
- Arif Mardin – arranger (track 5)
