= Samuel Blaser =

Swiss trombonist and composer

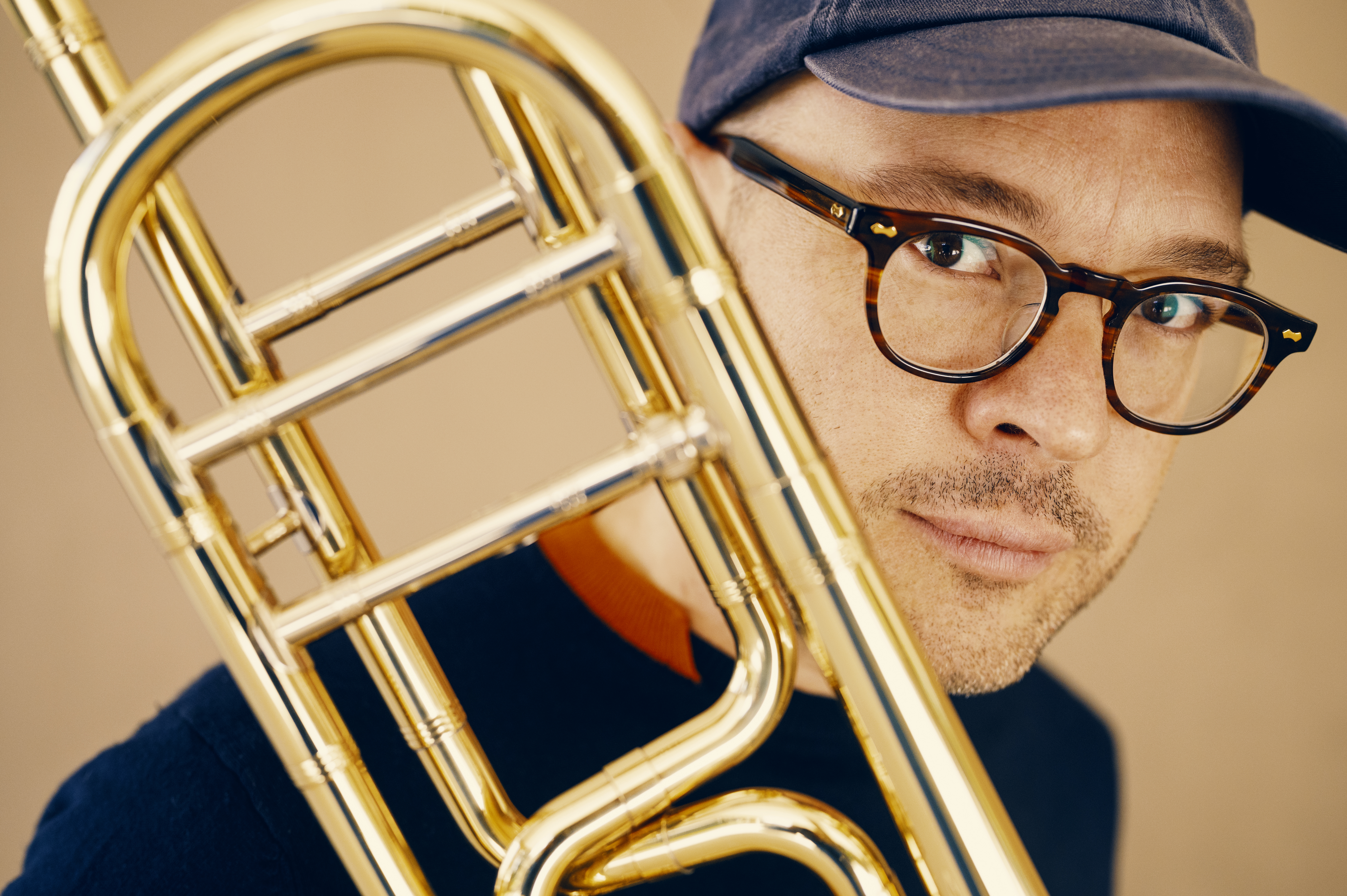
- Blaser in 2025

Background information
- Born: 1981 (age 44–45); La Chaux-de-Fonds, Switzerland
- Genres: Jazz
- Occupation: Musician
- Instrument: Trombone
- Labels: Blaser Music, SONGS, Hat Hut, Outhere Music, Whirlwind Recordings, Clean Feed, Fresh Sound
- Website: www.samuelblaser.com

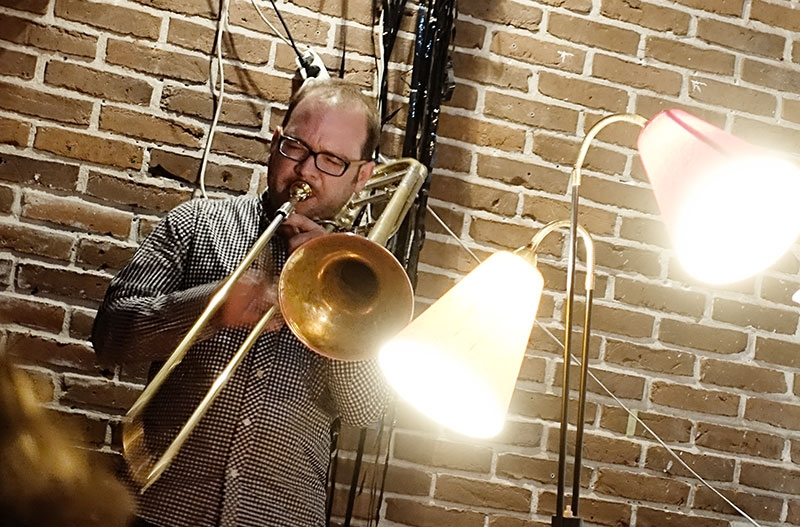
Samuel Blaser at Aarhus Jazz Festival 2015

Samuel Blaser (born 20 July 1981 in La Chaux-de-Fonds, Switzerland) is a Swiss trombonist and composer.

== Biography ==
Born and raised in La Chaux-de-Fonds, Switzerland, Samuel Blaser lived in New York City and Berlin for many years before relocating to his hometown, where he currently resides. He began trombone lessons at the age of 9, and his early interests ranged from Swiss folk music to American R&B and jazz. He entered the local conservatory at 14 and graduated in 2002 after being awarded prizes in both the jazz and classical spheres, including the 2000 Benny Golson Prize. Participation in the heralded Vienna Art Orchestra and European Radio Big Band eventually led to a Fulbright Scholarship, facilitating studies in the United States at the Purchase College Conservatory of Music where he studied with James E. Pugh, John Fedchock and Hal Galper.

Blaser's ability to combine knotty compositional form with incendiary improvisational prowess is matched by an unfettered yet ever-collaborative approach, resulting in a number of significant associations. These include his ongoing work with Swiss percussion legend Pierre Favre; a much-lauded duo with guitarist Marc Ducret; a trio with Swiss drummer Daniel Humair and bassist Heiri Känzig; a Quartet with Russ Lossing, Masa Kamaguchi and Billy Mintz; collaborations with saxophonist Oliver Lake, trumpet player Wallace Roney, drummer John Hollenbeck, Grammy Award-winning producer Robert Sadin, and clarinetist Michel Portal. In the genre of jazz, Blaser appears on over 80 recordings between 2000 and 2020.

In 2019 the French Jazz Academy presented Samuel Blaser with the coveted European Musician Award, recognizing the importance of his work in the field of jazz. The same year Blaser was voted #2 Rising Star Trombone of the 2019 Downbeat Critics Poll.

== Discography ==
- 7th Heaven (Between the Lines, 2008), with Scott DuBois, Thomas Morgan, Gerald Cleaver
- YAY (Fresh Sound, 2009), with Malcolm Braff
- Solo Bone (Slam Productions, 2009)
- Pieces of Old Sky (Clean Feed, 2009), with Thomas Morgan, Todd Neufeld
- Vol à Voile (Intakt, 2010), with Pierre Favre
- Boundless (Hathut, 2011), with Marc Ducret, Bänz Oester, Gerald Cleaver
- Consort in Motion (Kind of Blue, 2011), with Paul Motian, Russ Lossing, Thomas Morgan
- One from None (Fresh Sound, 2012), with Michael Bates, Michael Blake, Russ Lossing, Jeff Davis
- As The Sea (HatHut, 2012), with Marc Ducret, Bänz Oester, Gerald Cleaver
- A Mirror to Machaut (Songlines, 2013), with Joachim Badenhorst, Russ Lossing, Drew Gress, Gerry Hemingway
- Fourth Landscape (Nuscope, 2013), with Benoît Delbecq, Gerry Hemingway
- Spring Rain (Whirlwind, 2015), with Russ Lossing, Drew Gress, Gerald Cleaver
- Oostum (NoBusiness, 2018), with Gerry Hemingway
- Taktlos Zürich 2017 (Hathut, 2018), with Marc Ducret, Peter Bruun
- Early in the Mornin' (Outnote, 2018), with Russ Lossing, Masa Kamaguchi, Gerry Hemingway, Oliver Lake, Wallace Roney
- The Great Tommy McCook (Blaser Music, 2020), with Soweto Kinch, Michael Blake, Alex Wilson, Alan Weekes, Ira Coleman and Dion Parson
- Audio Rebel (Blaser Music, 2020), with Marc Ducret
- ABC vol. 1 (Blaser Music, 2020), with Marc Ducret and Peter Bruun
- ABC vol. 2 (Blaser Music, 2020), with Marc Ducret and Peter Bruun
- 1291 (Outnote, 2020), with Daniel Humair, Heiri Känzig
- 18 monologues élastiques (Blaser Music, 2020)
- Live at Cornelia Street Café (Blaser Music, 2020), with Paul Motian, Eivind Opsvik and Russ Lossing
- Moods (Blaser Music, 2020), with Marc Ducret, Masa Kamaguchi and Gerry Hemingway
- Voyageurs (Jazzdor Series, 2021), with Marc Ducret
- Same Place, Another Time. (Blaser Music, 2022), with Pierre Favre
- Folk Songs (SONGS/Blaser Music, 2022), with Ensemble SONGS & Sarah Maria Sun
- Roundabout + Triple Dip (Jazzdor Series, 2023), with Russ Lossing, Billy Mintz
- Routes (ENJA/Yellowbird, 2023), with Alex Wilson, Soweto Kinch, Michael Blake, Steve Turre, Lee "Scratch" Perry and others
- Our Way (Blaser Music, 2024), Helveticus: with Daniel Humair, Heiri Känzig
- Book Nine (Blaser Music, 2024), with Michael Bates
- Dark was the night, cold was the ground (Blaser Music, 2024), with Marc Ducret, Peter Bruun
- Rêverie (TCB, 2025), with Peter Bockius, Tilman Günther, Lucien Bovet
- 18 monologues élastiques (Blaser Music, 2025), solo trombone (reissue)
- Triple Dip, Live in Paris 1 + 2 (Blaser Music, 2025)

== Awards and honors ==
- European Musician Award, French Jazz Academy, 2019
- Downbeat Critics Poll, USA, Rising star trombonist, #1 in 2021, #2 in 2019, #4 in 2016, #4 in 2015, #7 in 2013
- New York City Jazz Record, USA, Musician of the Year, 2014
- Jazzparade, Switzerland, "Prix du public" et "coup de Coeur du Jury" awarded by Bob Mintzer, 2006
- Jay Jay Johnson Prize, USA, Honorable mention, 2006
- Fulbright Grant, USA, One-year Study Grant, 2005
- Robert Faller Prize, Switzerland, 2002
- Benny Golson Prize, Switzerland, 2000
