= The Paul Bley Quartet =

Studio album by the Paul Bley Quartet
- Released: March 7, 1988
- Recorded: November 1987
- Studio: Rainbow Studio; Oslo, Norway
- Genre: Avant-garde jazz, free jazz
- Length: 53:16
- Label: ECM 1365
- Producer: Manfred Eicher

Paul Bley chronology
Notes (1987)	The Paul Bley Quartet (1988)	Solo (1987)

The Paul Bley Quartet is an album by the Paul Bley Quartet, recorded in November 1987 and released on ECM March the following year. The eponymous quartet features reed player John Surman, guitarist Bill Frisell, and drummer Paul Motian.

== Reception ==
Professional ratings
Review scores
Source	Rating
AllMusic	4/5 stars
The Penguin Guide to Jazz	3/4 stars

The AllMusic review by Thom Jurek states:

While it's easy to argue that, with Manfred Eicher's icy, crystalline production, this was a stock date for both the artists and the label, that argument would be flat wrong. Bley was looking for a new lyricism in his own playing and in his compositions. He was coming from a different place than the large harmonies offered by augmented and suspended chords and writing for piano trios. The other band members—two other extremely lyrical improvisers in Surman and Frisell (who prized understatement as the veritable doorway to lyricism) and a drummer who was better known for his dancing through rhythms than playing them in Motian—were the perfect foils.

The Penguin Guide to Jazz said "The long 'Interplay' on the latter, eponymous set, is disappointing enough to ease that album back a stellar notch".

== Track listing ==
1. "Interplay" (Paul Bley) - 20:22
2. "Heat" (John Surman) - 8:18
3. "After Dark" (Bill Frisell) - 11:55
4. "One in Four" (Paul Motian) - 9:33
5. "Triste" (Paul Bley) - 2:58

== Personnel ==
- Paul Bley – piano
- John Surman – soprano saxophone, bass clarinet
- Bill Frisell – guitar
- Paul Motian – drums
