= At the Village Vanguard =

Live album by Paul Motian
- Released: 1995
- Recorded: June 1995; Village Vanguard, NYC
- Genre: Jazz
- Length: 69:09
- Label: JMT; JMT 514 028
- Producer: Stefan F. Winter

Paul Motian chronology
Sound of Love (1995)	At the Village Vanguard (1995)	Flight of the Blue Jay (1996)

At the Village Vanguard (subtitled You Took the Words Right Out of My Heart) is a live album by jazz drummer Paul Motian recorded at the Village Vanguard and originally released on the German JMT label. Recorded in 1995 it features performances by Motian with guitarist Bill Frisell and tenor saxophonist Joe Lovano. The album was rereleased on the Winter & Winter label in 2005.

== Reception ==
The Allmusic review by Thom Jurek awarded the album 3½ stars, stating: "This is a prime Motian date, not to be missed this time around".

Professional ratings
Review scores
Source	Rating
Allmusic	3.5/5 stars

== Track listing ==
All compositions by Paul Motian except as indicated

1. "You Took the Words Right Out of My Heart" (Ralph Rainger, Leo Robin) - 7:58
2. "Abacus" - 9:38
3. "Folk Song for Rosie" - 10:19
4. "The Owl of Cranston" - 8:30
5. "5 Miles to Wrentham" - 4:46
6. "Yahllah" - 14:16
7. "The Sunflower" - 8:33
8. "Circle Dance" - 5:04
- Recorded at the Village Vanguard in New York City in June 1995

== Personnel ==
- Paul Motian - drums
- Bill Frisell - electric guitar
- Joe Lovano - tenor saxophone
