= Songs and Rituals in Real Time =

Studio album by Tim Berne
- Released: 1982
- Recorded: July 1, 1981
- Genre: Avant-garde jazz Downtown music
- Label: Empire Productions (USA, 1982) / Screwgun (USA, 1998)
- Producer: Tim Berne

Tim Berne chronology
| Spectres (1981) | Songs and Rituals in Real Time (1982) | The Ancestors (1983) |

Professional ratings
Review scores
| Source | Rating |
|---|---|
| Allmusic | 3/5 stars |
| The Rolling Stone Jazz Record Guide | 3/5 stars |

Songs and Rituals in Real Time is a double LP album by Tim Berne released by Empire Productions (USA) in 1982 and re-released on CD as a part of The Empire Box on Screwgun Records (USA) in 1998. The album was Recorded live at Inroads, New York City on July 1, 1981. It features Berne in a quartet with tenor saxophonist Mack Goldsbury, bassist Ed Schuller and drummer Paul Motian.

Tim Berne on inviting Paul Motian to play:

"I met Paul Motian when he was doing a gig with the bass player Saheb Sarbib. And I just went up to him and I asked him. And to this day I have no idea how I got the nerve. But he sort of said 'Yeah, man, send me something,' or whatever. I may have given him a record or sent him a tape. I called him up a couple of weeks later and asked him if he listened to it, and he said 'No.' But then he said, 'Yeah, whatever, I’ll do the gig.' And that was this gig that turned into this record. It was live at this place Inroads. We rehearsed a lot, we played two sets, recorded it, and that’s Songs and Rituals in Real Time: The first time we ever played together. I remember Bill DeArango, the guitar player, was sitting in the front row. It was a kind of special gig. I mean it was really pretty cool."

== Track listing ==
(All compositions by Tim Berne)

1. "San Antonio / The Unknown Factor" - 20:00
2. "Roberto Miguel (For Roberto Miguel Miranda)" - 4:50
3. "New Dog/Old Tricks" - 15:13
4. "Shirley's Song (For Shirley Britt) / The Mutant Of Alberan" - 27:06
5. "Flies / The Ancient Ones (for Alex Cline)" - 26:06

== Personnel ==
- Tim Berne: alto saxophone
- Mack Goldsbury: tenor & soprano saxophones
- Ed Schuller: bass
- Paul Motian: drums

== Notes ==
- Recorded live at Inroads, New York City on July 1, 1981

== Releases ==
- 1982 - Empire Productions (USA), Empire EPC 60K-2 (2xLP)
- 1998 - Screwgun (USA), SCR 70009 (5xCD) (The Empire Box)
