= The Ancestors =

Studio album by Tim Berne Sextet
- Released: 1983
- Recorded: February 19th 1983
- Genre: Avant-garde jazz Downtown music
- Length: 44:39
- Label: Soul Note (Italy)
- Producer: Empire Productions & Giovanni Bonandrini

Tim Berne chronology
Songs And Rituals In Real Time (1982)	The Ancestors (1983)	Mutant Variations (1983)

The Ancestors is an album by Tim Berne, released on the Italian-based Soul Note label in 1983. It features three lengthy tracks which, typical of Berne, are structured in suite-like sections. The music is performed by the Tim Berne Sextet which consisted of Berne, trumpeter Herb Robertson, trombonist Ray Anderson, saxophonist Mack Goldsbury, bassist Ed Schuller and drummer Paul Motian.

== Reception ==
Professional ratings
Review scores
Source	Rating
The Penguin Guide to Jazz	3/4 stars
The Rolling Stone Jazz Record Guide	3/5 stars

The Penguin Guide to Jazz said, "The Ancestors was a first sign that Berne was willing to slow down, look about him and take stock. ...it's a measured authoritative set, rhythmically coherent".

== Track listing ==
1. "Sirius B" (Berne) - 10:46
2. "Shirley's Song - Part 1" (Berne) - 12:46
3. "Shirley's Song - Part 2 / San Antonio / The Ancestors" (Berne) - 21:05

== Personnel ==
- Tim Berne: alto saxophone
- Herb Robertson: trumpet, cornet & flugelhorn
- Ray Anderson: trombone & tuba
- Mack Goldsbury: tenor & soprano saxophone
- Ed Schuller: acoustic bass
- Paul Motian: drums & percussion

== Notes ==
- Recorded live on February 19, 1983, at the School of Visual Arts, NYC.
- Recording Engineer: Kazunori Sugiyama
- Produced by Empire Productions & Giovanni Bonandrini
- Cover painting by Betsy Berne

== Releases ==
- 1983 - Soul Note (Italy), SN 1061 (LP)
- 1991 - Soul Note (Italy), 121061-1 (LP)
- 1991 - Soul Note (Italy), 121061-2 (CD)
- 1991 - Soul Note (Italy), 121061-4 (CT)

== Other source ==
- "Tim Berne Discography". Patrice Roussel. 1999.
