= Monk in Motian =

Studio album by Paul Motian
- Released: 1989
- Recorded: March 1988
- Genre: Jazz
- Length: 49:40
- Label: JMT
- Producer: Stefan F. Winter

Paul Motian chronology
One Time Out (1987)	Monk in Motian (1989)	On Broadway Volume 1 (1989)

Monk in Motian is a 1988 album by American jazz drummer Paul Motian, his first to be released on the German JMT label and his 11th as a bandleader. The album features ten compositions by Thelonious Monk performed by Motian with his longtime trio, guitarist Bill Frisell and tenor saxophonist Joe Lovano. Pianist Geri Allen and tenor saxophonist Dewey Redman also appear. The album was reissued in 2002 on the Winter & Winter label.

== Reception ==
Professional ratings
Review scores
Source	Rating
AllMusic	4.5/5 stars

The New York Times concluded that, "except for Monk's own groups and the Monk alumni quartet Sphere, few bands have captured the music's wit, intelligence and deep-seated eccentricity so well."

The AllMusic review by Scott Yanow stated: "This is an utterly fascinating tribute to the music of Thelonious Monk. Most of the selections feature the unusual trio of tenor saxophonist Joe Lovano, guitarist Bill Frisell (who with his wide range of original sounds is really a one-man band), and drummer Paul Motian. Tenor saxophonist Dewey Redman and pianist Geri Allen are guests on two songs apiece and fit in quite well with the sparse but very complete trio. Among the ten Monk songs explored, taken apart and given surprising treatment are 'Evidence', 'Bye-Ya', 'Ugly Beauty', and 'Trinkle Tinkle'. Recommended to open-eared listeners."

== Track listing ==
1. "Crepuscule with Nellie" - 4:57
2. "Justice (Evidence)" - 4:41
3. "Ruby, My Dear" - 4:52
4. "Straight, No Chaser" - 4:27
5. "Bye-Ya" - 5:00
6. "Ugly Beauty" - 4:57
7. "Trinkle, Trinkle" - 4:55
8. "Epistrophy" (Clarke, Monk) - 7:01
9. "Off Minor" - 4:20
10. "Reflections" - 4:48

All compositions by Thelonious Monk except as indicated
- Recorded March 1988 at A&R Recording Studios, NYC

== Personnel ==
- Paul Motian - drums
- Joe Lovano - tenor saxophone
- Bill Frisell - electric guitar
- Geri Allen - piano (tracks 3 & 9)
- Dewey Redman - tenor saxophone (tracks 4 & 8)
