= And If =

Studio album by Anat Fort Trio
- Released: August 20, 2010
- Recorded: February 2009
- Studios: Rainbow Studio; Oslo Norway
- Genre: Jazz
- Length: 52:17
- Labels: ECM; ECM 2109
- Producer: Manfred Eicher

Anat Fort chronology
A Long Story (2007)	And If (2010)	Birdwatching (2016)

And If is an album by the Anat Fort Trio, featuring Fort on piano, Gary Wang on bass and Roland Schneider on drums, recorded in Norway in February 2009 and released on ECM in August the following year.

== Reception ==
Professional ratings
Review scores
Source	Rating
AllMusic	4/5 stars
The Guardian	4/5 stars

The AllMusic review by Michael G. Nastos states "Anat Fort's second project for ECM follows along the spiritual and meditative lines of her first recording A Long Story. Here the pianist from Israel uses shorter, thematic forms that glide gently toward their conclusions, beautifully flowered, and crafted with light colors... And If suggests Fort's roots in her native Middle East are merging toward American influences with increasing depth."

Writing for The Guardian reviewer John Fordham observed "It's an attractive mix, played with an immaculate touch, but Fort's child-song simplicities might make it a bit coy for hardliners."

Writing for All About Jazz, Dan McClenaghan noted "Her sophomore And If is every bit as beautiful and more personal, delivering on the promises made by Fort's wonderful debut."

== Track listing ==
All compositions by Anat Fort

1. "Paul Motian (1)" - 4:02
2. "Clouds Moving" - 5:35
3. "En If" - 5:54
4. "Some" - 5:40
5. "Something 'bout Camels" - 9:51
6. "If" - 1:18
7. "Lanesboro" - 5:15
8. "Minnesota" - 7:34
9. "Nu" - 2:50
10. "Paul Motian (2)" - 4:00

== Personnel ==
- Anat Fort – piano
- Gary Wang – double bass
- Roland Schneider – drums
