= Motian in Tokyo =

Live album by Paul Motian
- Released: December 1991
- Recorded: March 28–29, 1991
- Venues: Sony Building, Tokyo
- Genre: Jazz
- Length: 52:32
- Label: Bamboo (Japan) · JMT
- Producer: Stefan F. Winter

Paul Motian chronology
Bill Evans (1990)	Motian in Tokyo (1991)	On Broadway Volume 3 (1991)

Motian in Tokyo is a live album by Paul Motian recorded and released by Japanese Bamboo label of Polydor K.K. at the end of 1991, and widely distributed through PolyGram. The album features performances by Motian with guitarist Bill Frisell and tenor saxophonist Joe Lovano and was rereleased on the Winter & Winter label in 2003.

== Reception ==
The Allmusic review by Scott Yanow awarded the album three stars, stating: "The music is reminiscent of both Coleman and Keith Jarrett in spots, and is often floating and wandering, generally staying quite coherent, with some fiery moments. But overall, this interesting but not essential set does not live up to its great potential".

Professional ratings
Review scores
Source	Rating
Allmusic	3/5 stars
The Encyclopedia of Popular Music	3/5 stars
The Penguin Guide to Jazz Recordings	3.5/4 stars

== Track listing ==
All compositions by Paul Motian except as indicated

1. "From Time to Time" - 6:58
2. "Shakalaka" - 6:18
3. "Kathelin Gray" (Ornette Coleman, Pat Metheny) - 6:54
4. "The Hoax" - 1:00
5. "Mumbo Jumbo" - 10:43
6. "Birdsong I" - 1:34
7. "Mode VI" - 7:29
8. "Two Women from Padua" - 4:53
9. "It Is" - 5:11
10. "Birdsong II" - 1:32

- Recorded at Sony Building in Tokyo, Japan on March 28 & 29, 1991

== Personnel ==
- Paul Motian - drums
- Bill Frisell - electric guitar
- Joe Lovano - tenor saxophone
