= Ed Schuller =

American jazz bassist and composer (born 1955)

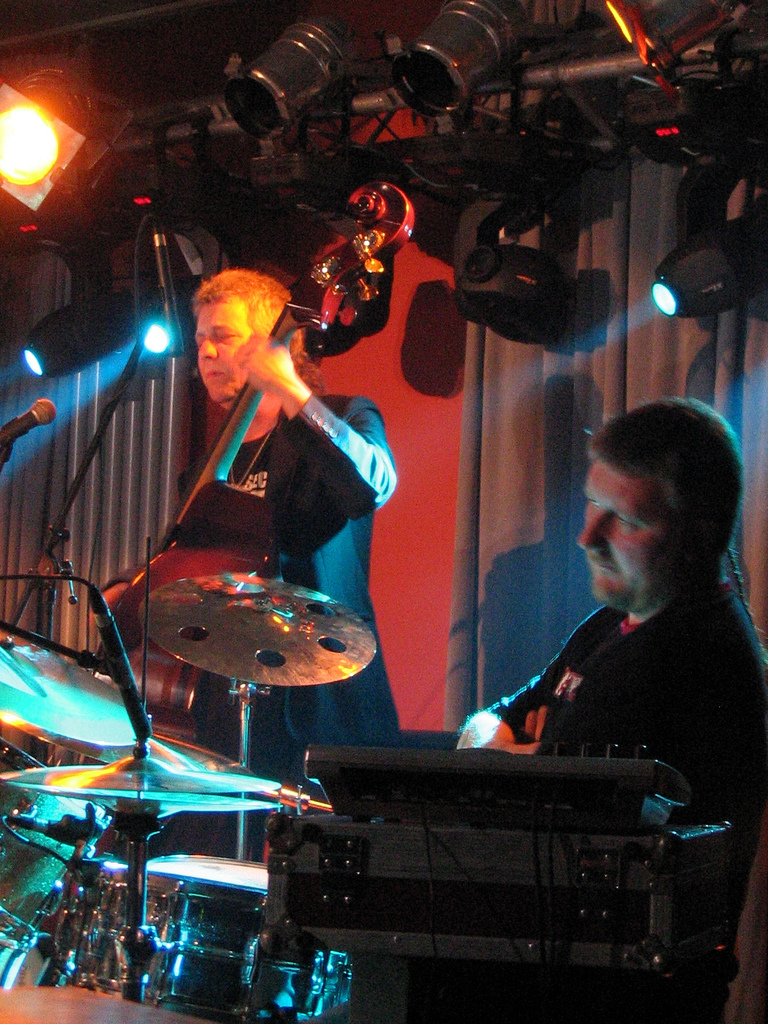
- Ed Schuller and Adam Czerwiński

Background information
- Birth name: Edwin Gunther Schuller
- Born: January 11, 1955 (age 70); New York City;
- Genres: Jazz
- Occupation: Musician
- Instrument: Double bass

Edwin Gunther Schuller (January 11, 1955) is an American jazz bassist and composer. His father is Gunther Schuller, a composer, horn player, and music professor, and his younger brother is drummer George Schuller.

== Career ==
A native of New York City, Schuller learned clarinet and guitar as a child. He switched to double bass at age 15, and the same year he had his first professional appearances with Ricky Ford. He studied at the New England Conservatory of Music.

Schuller has played with Lee Konitz, Joe Lovano, Ted Curson, Dave Liebman, Abbey Rader, Jimmy Knepper, Clark Terry, Ran Blake, Paul McCandless, Billy Hart, Mat Maneri, Marty Ehrlich, and Roland Hanna, and has toured with Lovano, Paul Motian, Tim Berne, Jim Pepper, Pat Martino, Mal Waldron, Uli Lenz, Karl Berger, Gerry Hemingway, Marty Cook, Nicolas Simian, Perry Robinson, Barry Miles, Terry Silverlight, and Jaki Byard. He has played on over 60 recordings and been a member of numerous collective ensembles, including the ensemble that recorded Charles Mingus's Epitaph in 1990.

Schuller has taught at the Newark Academy and at Berklee College of Music, and was the head of the jazz department at Schweitzer Institute of Music in Idaho from 1988.

== Discography ==
=== As leader ===
- Conspiracy (EmArcy, 1983)
- The Eleventh Hour (Enja/Tutu, 1993)
- To Know Where One Is (GM, 1995)
- Mu-Point (Tutu, 1996)
- Snake Dancing (Tutu, 1996)
- Force (Tutu, 1996)
- Art of the Duo (Tutu, 2001)
- Ong Song: Music for Acoustic Bass (GM, 2002)
- As It Grows (Hathut, 2004)

=== As sideman ===
With Franco Ambrosetti

- Music for Symphony and Jazz Band (Enja, 1991)

With Tim Berne

- Spectres (Empire, 1981)
- Songs and Rituals in Real Time, Empire, 1982)
- The Ancestors (Soul Note, 1983)
- Mutant Variations (Soul Note, 1984)

With Anat Fort

- A Long Story (ECM, 2007)

With Paul Grabowsky

- Tales of Time and Space (Sanctuary, 2005)

With Russ Lossing

- Dreamer (Double-Time, 2000)
- As It Grows (HatOLOGY, 2002)

With Uli Lenz

- Echoes of Mandela (Tutu, 1997)
- Good-bye Venus (Tutu, 2007)

With Joe Lovano

- Rush Hour (Blue Note, 1994)

With Joe Maneri

- Tenderly (hatOLOGY, 1993 [1999])
- Coming Down the Mountain (hatOLOGY, 1993 [1997])

With Paul Motian

- Psalm (ECM, 1982)
- The Story of Maryam (Soul Note, 1984)
- Jack of Clubs (Soul Note, 1985)
- Misterioso (Soul Note, 1987)

With Night Ark

- Treasures (Traditional Crossroads, 2000)

With Jim Pepper

- Comin' and Goin' (Europa, 1983)

With Herb Robertson

- Certified (JMT, 1991)

With Mal Waldron

- Mal, Dance and Soul (Tutu, 1988)
- Quadrologue at Utopia (Tutu, 1989)
- More Git' Go at Utopia (Tutu, 1989)
- Mal, Verve, Black & Blue (Tutu, 1994)

With Tom Varner

- Motion/Stillness (Soul Note, 1982)
