= Trioism =

Studio album by Paul Motian
- Released: 1994
- Recorded: June 1993
- Genre: Jazz
- Length: 35:59
- Label: JMT
- Producer: Stefan F. Winter

Paul Motian chronology
Paul Motian and the Electric Bebop Band (1992)	Trioism (1994)	Reincarnation of a Love Bird (1994)

Trioism is an album by jazz drummer Paul Motian that was released on the German JMT label. Recorded in 1993, it was first released in 1994 and features performances by Motian with guitarist Bill Frisell and tenor saxophonist Joe Lovano (with tenor saxophonist Dewey Redman added on one track.) The album was rereleased on the Winter & Winter label in 2005.

== Reception ==
The Allmusic review by John Vallier awarded the album 4½ stars, stating: "A first-rate work, Paul Motian's Trioism is one of those rare, successful ensemble performances that manages to both stir and calm the soul".

Professional ratings
Review scores
Source	Rating
Allmusic	4.5/5 stars
The Penguin Guide to Jazz Recordings	3/4 stars

== Track listing ==
All compositions by Paul Motian

1. "It Should've Happened a Long Time Ago" - 8:47
2. "Cosmology" - 6:26
3. "Blue Midnight" - 4:12
4. "Congestion" - 2:41
5. "Monica's Garden" - 3:35
6. "Jack of Clubs" - 5:11
7. "Play" - 4:57
8. "In Remembrance of Things Past" - 7:30
9. "Zabel" - 1:37
10. "Endgame" -3:56

- Recorded RPM Recording Studios, New York City in June 1993

== Personnel ==
- Paul Motian - drums
- Bill Frisell - electric guitar
- Joe Lovano - tenor saxophone
- Dewey Redman - tenor saxophone (“In Remembrance of Things Past”)
