= Jim Pepper =

Native American jazz musician

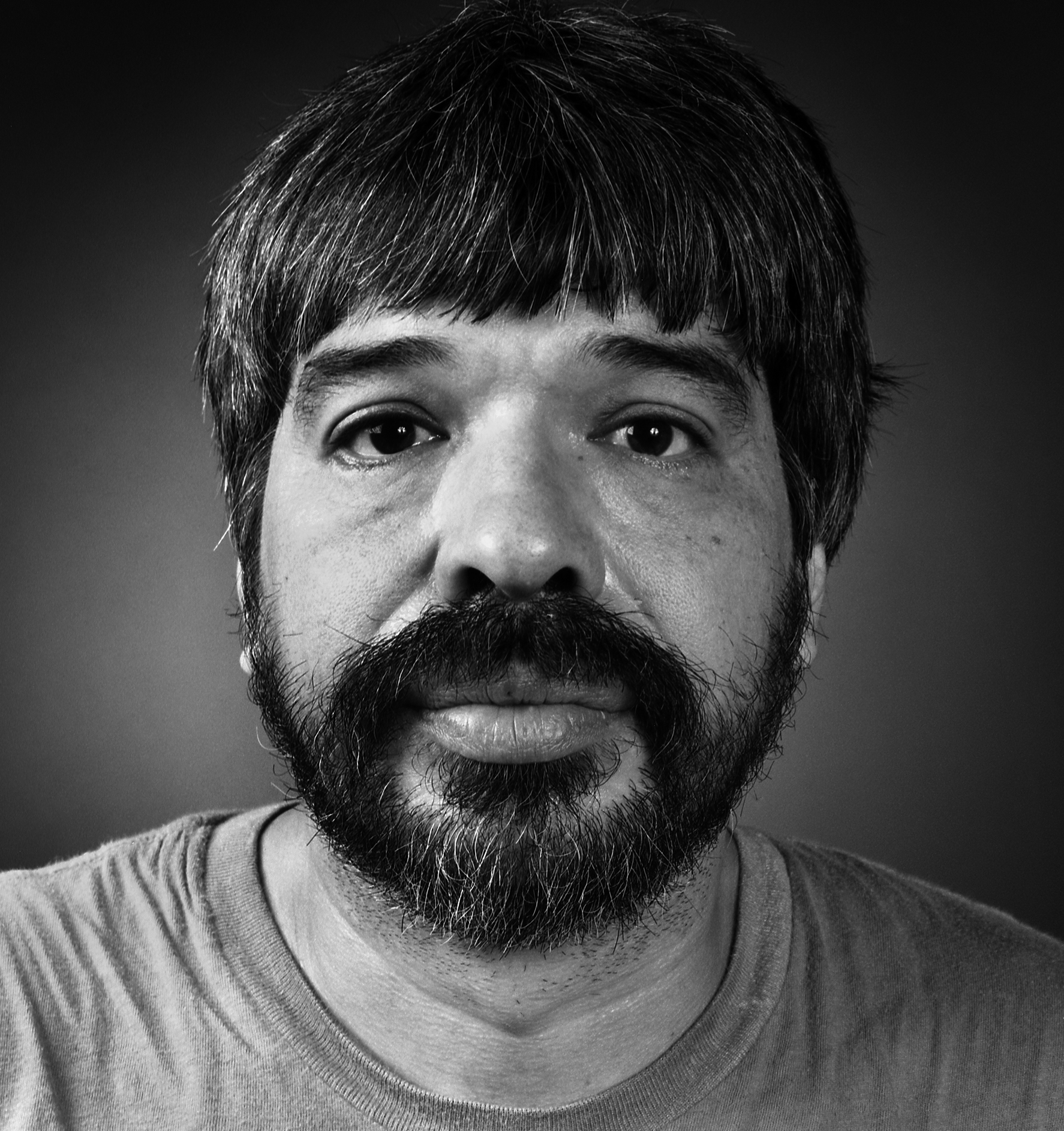

Background information
- Born: Jim Gilbert Pepper II; June 18, 1941; Salem, Oregon, United States
- Died: February 10, 1992 (aged 50) Portland, Oregon, United States
- Genres: Jazz, Native American
- Occupations: Singer; composer; saxophonist
- Instruments: Tenor and soprano saxophone, flute, percussion

Jim Gilbert Pepper II (June 18, 1941 – February 10, 1992) was an American jazz saxophonist, composer and singer of Kaw and Muscogee heritage.

He moved to New York City in 1964, where he came to prominence in the late 1960s as a member of The Free Spirits, an early jazz-rock fusion group that also featured Larry Coryell and Bob Moses. Pepper went on to have a lengthy career in jazz, recording almost a dozen albums as a bandleader and many more as featured soloist or sideman. Pepper and Joe Lovano played tenor sax alongside each other in an acclaimed band led by drummer Paul Motian, recording three LPs in 1984, 1985 and 1987. Motian described Pepper's playing as "post-Coltrane". Don Cherry was among those who encouraged Pepper to bring more of his Native culture into his music, and the two collaborated extensively. Pepper died of lymphoma aged 50.

== Early life ==
Jim Pepper was born on June 18, 1941, to Gilbert and Floy Pepper in Salem, Oregon. He grew up in Portland. He attended Parkrose High School and Madison High School.

== Music career ==
Beginning in the late 1960s, Pepper became a pioneer of fusion jazz. His band, The Free Spirits (active between 1965 and 1968, with guitarist Larry Coryell), is credited as the first to combine elements of jazz and rock. His primary instrument was the tenor saxophone, but he also played flute, soprano saxophone and percussion, and occasionally sang.

Of Kaw and Creek heritage, Pepper also achieved notoriety for his compositions combining elements of jazz and Native American music. Don Cherry (of Choctaw and African American heritage) and Ornette Coleman encouraged Pepper to reflect his roots and heritage and incorporate it into his jazz playing and composition. He was a musical director for Night of the First Americans, a 1980 Native American self-awareness benefit concert at the John F. Kennedy Center for the Performing Arts in Washington D.C. Pepper also supported the American Indian Movement and played at numerous powwows.

Pepper was a member of the short-lived band Everything Is Everything with Chris Hills, Lee Reinoehl, Chip Baker, John Waller and Jim Zitro. Their 1969 self-titled sole album spawned the single "Witchi Tai To", on which Pepper was the lead singer. It received airplay and reached number 69 on the Billboard Hot 100 chart. It was issued on Vanguard Apostolic and UK Vanguard in England, and is the only hit to feature an authentic Native American chant in the history of the Billboard pop charts.

His "Witchi Tai To" (derived from a peyote song of the Native American Church which he had learned from his grandfather) is the most famous example of his hybrid (jazz/Native American) style; the song has been covered by many other artists including Harpers Bizarre, Ralph Towner (with and without Oregon), Jan Garbarek, Tom Grant, Pete Wyoming Bender, Brewer & Shipley, Larry Smith under the pseudonym "Topo D. Bill", The Supremes in 1969 (unreleased until 2022), Quebec singer-songwriter Robert Charlebois in 1973, British dance duo X-Press 2 (with vocals by Tim DeLaughter) in 2006, and by Pavement on their 2022-2024 reunion tour.

In his own projects, Pepper recorded with Don Cherry, Naná Vasconcelos, Collin Walcott, Kenny Werner, John Scofield, Ed Schuller, Hamid Drake, and many others. His CD Comin' and Goin' (1984) is the definitive statement of Pepper's unique "American Indian jazz" with nine songs played by four different line-ups. It was also the first CD issued by the then-new all-CD label Rykodisc. He also worked with the Liberation Music Orchestra, Paul Motian' s quintet, Bob Moses, Marty Cook, Mal Waldron, David Friesen, Tony Hymas and Amina Claudine Myers, and toured Europe extensively throughout his career.

While anecdotal mention of Pepper having played the saxophone solo on the Classics IV hit "Spooky" exists, this has been rather definitively credited to "Spooky" 's cowriter, Michael (Mike Sharpe) Shapiro, by Classics IV official biographer, Joe Glickman, and others.

== Death and legacy ==
Jim Pepper died on February 10, 1992, of lymphoma.

In 1998, composer Gunther Schuller arranged, conducted and recorded Witchi Tai To: The Music of Jim Pepper for symphony orchestra and jazz band.

Pepper was posthumously granted the Lifetime Musical Achievement Award by First Americans in the Arts in 1999, and in 2000 he was inducted into the Native American Music Awards Hall of Fame. In 2005 the Oregon Legislative Assembly honored the extraordinary accomplishments and musical legacy of Pepper.

In April 2007, the National Museum of the American Indian in Washington, D.C. accepted Pepper's saxophone and hat at a ceremony honoring his music and legacy.

On July 24, 2023, Pepper's former home in Northeast Portland was added to the National Register of Historic Places, which protects it from demolition and recognizes it as a place of significance to contemporary Indigenous history.

== Discography ==
- Pepper's Pow Wow (Embryo, 1971)
- Comin' and Goin' (Europa, 1983)
- Dakota Song (Enja, 1987)
- Art of the Duo (Tutu, 1988) with Mal Waldron
- The Path (Enja, 1988)
- West End Avenue (Nagal, 1989) with Christoph Spendel, Ron McClure and Reuben Hoch
- Camargue (Pan, 1989) with the Claudine François Trio
- Flying Eagle: Live at New Morning, Paris (1989)
- Remembrance (Tutu, 1990)
- Polar Bear Stomp (Universal, 1991 [2003])
- Afro Indian Blues (PAO, 1991 2006) with Amina Claudine Myers, Anthony Cox and Leopoldo Fleming

With Everything Is Everything

- Everything Is Everything (Vanguard, 1969)

With The Free Spirits

- Out of Sight and Sound (ABC, 1967)
- Live at the Scene (Sunbeam, 2011)

=== As sideman ===
With Archie James Cavanaugh

- Black and White Raven (BWR, 1980)

With Marty Cook

- Nightwork (Enja, 1987)
- Red, White, Black & Blue (Enja, 1987)

With Larry Coryell

- Coryell (Vanguard, 1969)

With The Fugs

- The Belle of Avenue A (Reprise, 1969)

With Gordon Lee

- Land Whales in New York (Gleeful, 1982 [1990])

With Charlie Haden

- The Ballad of the Fallen (ECM, 1983)

With Sandy Hurvitz

- Sandy's Album Is Here At Last (Verve, 1967)

With Tony Hymas

- Oyaté (Nato, 1990)

With Paul Motian

- The Story of Maryam (Soul Note, 1984)
- Jack of Clubs (Soul Note, 1985)
- Misterioso (Soul Note, 1987)

With Bob Moses

- Love Animal (Amulet, 1968 [2003])
- When Elephants Dream of Music (Gramavision, 1983)

With Cam Newton

- Welcome Aliens (Inner City, 1979)

With Ray and the Wolf Gang

- The Blues Can't Turn You Loose (Gray Cats, 1987)

With Nana Simopoulos

- Wings and Air (Enja, 1986)

With Mal Waldron

- Remembering the Moment with Julian Priester, Eddie Moore & David Friesen (Soul Note, 1987)
- Quadrologue at Utopia (Tutu, 1989)
- More Git' Go at Utopia (Tutu, 1989)

With Peter Walker

- Second Poem to Karmela or Gypsies Are Important (Vanguard, 1968)

With the World Music Orchestra

- East West Suite (Granite, 1990)

== Filmography ==
- Pepper's Pow Wow (1995). Directed by Sandra Sunrising Osawa. Seattle, Washington: Upstream Productions.
