= Bill Evans (album) =

Studio album by Paul Motian
- Released: 25 October 1990
- Recorded: May 1990
- Genre: Jazz
- Length: 55:18
- Label: JMT
- Producer: Stefan F. Winter

Paul Motian chronology
| On Broadway Volume 2 (1989) | Bill Evans (1990) | Motian in Tokyo (1991) |

Bill Evans is an album by Paul Motian on the German JMT label. It was released in 1990 and features nine compositions by pianist Bill Evans (Motian's former employer) performed by Motian with guitarist Bill Frisell, tenor saxophonist Joe Lovano and bassist Marc Johnson. The album was reissued in 2002 on the Winter & Winter label.

== Reception ==
The Allmusic review by Stephen Cook awarded the album 4½ stars, stating: "This is one of the best releases of the handful Motian has done with Lovano and Frisell, and certainly as fine a tribute record as there is. A good purchase for fans of both Bill Evans and Paul Motian".

Professional ratings
Review scores
| Source | Rating |
|---|---|
| Allmusic | 4.5/5 stars |

== Track listing ==
All compositions by Bill Evans

1. "Show-Type Tune" - 6:16
2. "Turn Out the Stars" - 7:14
3. "Walkin' Up" - 5:39
4. "Very Early" - 5:55
5. "Five" - 3:34
6. "Time Remembered" - 7:28
7. "Skidoo" - 8:16
8. "Re: Person I Knew" - 7:14
9. "Children's Play Song" - 4:18
  - Recorded May 1990 at A&R Recording Studios, NYC

== Personnel ==
- Paul Motian – drums
- Bill Frisell – electric guitar
- Joe Lovano – tenor saxophone
- Marc Johnson – bass
