= Comin' and Goin' =

Studio album by Jim Pepper
- Released: 1983
- Recorded: May 12, June 22–23 and August 17, 1983
- Studio: Eurosound Studios and Quadrosonic Studios, NYC
- Genre: Crossover Jazz/Native American music
- Length: 44:14
- Label: Europa; JP 2014
- Producer: Jean-Pierre Weiller

Jim Pepper chronology
Pepper's Pow Wow (1971)	Comin' and Goin' (1983)	Dakota Song (1987)

Comin' and Goin' is the second album led by Native American saxophonist and composer Jim Pepper recorded in 1983 and first released on the French Europa label. The album was reissued on Antilles in 1987.

== Reception ==
Professional ratings
Review scores
Source	Rating
Allmusic	4.5/5 stars

Allmusic awarded the album 4½ stars with its review by Michael G. Nastos stating, "Of the limited discography offered to us by Jim Pepper, this is his finest contemporary recording... Pepper creates world jazz fusion with a twist relating to his heritage, something that perhaps nobody else has done, or is capable of" and calling it an "inspired and inspirational set, which is highly recommended".

== Track listing ==
All compositions by Jim Pepper except as indicated

1. "Witchi-Tai-To" – 8:19
2. "Ya Na Ho" (Gilbert Pepper) – 3:00
3. "Squaw Song" (Gilbert Pepper) – 5:24
4. "Goin' Down to Muskogee" – 5:50
5. "Comin' and Goin'" – 4:41
6. "Lakota Song" (Traditional) – 4:23
7. "Water" – 5:40
8. "Custer Gets It" – 3:02
9. "Malinyea" (Don Cherry) – 4:15

== Personnel ==
- Jim Pepper – tenor saxophone, soprano saxophone, vocals
- Nana Vasconcelos – percussion, vocals
- Don Cherry – trumpet (tracks 3 & 9)
- Kenny Werner – piano (tracks 1, 3–5 & 7–9)
- Bill Frisell (track 6), John Scofield (tracks 1, 4, 5 & 8) – guitar
- Mark Helias (tracks 3, 7 & 9), Ed Schuller (track 6) – bass
- Lester McFarland – electric bass, vocals (tracks 1, 4, 5 & 8)
- Colin Walcott – tabla, sitar (tracks 2, 3, 7 & 9)
- Danny Gottlieb – drums, vocals (tracks 3, 7 & 9)
- Hamid Drake – percussion, vocals
- Jane Lind, Caren Knight – vocals (track 6)
