= On Broadway Volume 1 =

Studio album by Paul Motian
- Released: 1989
- Recorded: November 1988
- Genre: Jazz
- Length: 43:34
- Label: JMT
- Producer: Stefan F. Winter

Paul Motian chronology
Monk in Motian (1988)	On Broadway Volume 1 (1989)	On Broadway Volume 2 (1989)

On Broadway Volume 1 is the second album by Paul Motian to be released on the German JMT label. It was released in 1989 and features performances of Broadway show tunes by Motian with guitarist Bill Frisell and tenor saxophonist Joe Lovano. The album was followed by four subsequent volumes, and it was rereleased on the Winter & Winter label in 2003.

== Reception ==
The Allmusic review by Scott Yanow awarded the album 4½ stars, stating, "The quartet of tenorman Joe Lovano, guitarist Bill Frisell, bassist Charlie Haden and drummer Paul Motian digs into nine show tunes from the 1930s and 40s, reinventing them in colorful fashion. The key to the rewarding project is Frisell, whose versatility and wide range of highly original sounds make the overall results sound quite unique. Among the highlights of the memorable set are unusual versions of "Liza," "They Didn't Believe Me" and "Last Night When We Were Young.".

Professional ratings
Review scores
Source	Rating
Allmusic	4.5/5 stars

== Track listing ==
1. "Liza (All the Clouds'll Roll Away)" (Gershwin, Gershwin, Kahn) - 4:31
2. "Over the Rainbow" (Arlen, Harburg) - 3:14
3. "They Didn't Believe Me" (Kern, Reynolds, Rourke) - 4:20
4. "What Is This Thing Called Love?" (Porter) - 4:55
5. "My Heart Belongs to Daddy" (Porter) - 4:54
6. "Last Night When We Were Young" (Arlen, Harburg) - 5:20
7. "I Concentrate on You" (Porter) - 3:14
8. "Someone to Watch Over Me" (Gershwin, Gershwin) - 9:20
9. "So in Love" (Porter) - 4:05

- Recorded November 1988 at RPM Studios, NYC

== Personnel ==
- Joe Lovano – tenor saxophone
- Bill Frisell – electric guitar
- Charlie Haden – bass
- Paul Motian – drums
