= On Broadway Volume 3 =

Studio album by Paul Motian
- Released: 1993
- Recorded: August 1991
- Studio: Sigma Sound, New York City
- Genre: Jazz
- Length: 55:56
- Label: JMT
- Producer: Stefan F. Winter

Paul Motian chronology
Motian in Tokyo (1991)	On Broadway Volume 3 (1993)	Paul Motian and the Electric Bebop Band (1992)

On Broadway Volume 3 is the third album of Broadway show tunes by Paul Motian to be released on the German JMT label. Recorded in 1991, it was released in 1993 and features performances by Motian with guitarist Bill Frisell, bassist Charlie Haden, alto saxophonist Lee Konitz and tenor saxophonist Joe Lovano. The album was rereleased on the Winter & Winter label in 2004.

== Reception ==
The Allmusic review by Thom Jurek awarded the album 4 1/2 stars, stating: "In all this is a fine set and perhaps the most successful of the three volumes in this series".

Professional ratings
Review scores
Source	Rating
Allmusic	4.5/5 stars
The Penguin Guide to Jazz Recordings	3/4 stars

== Track listing ==
1. "How Deep Is the Ocean?" (Irving Berlin) - 6:49
2. "I Wish I Knew" (Mack Gordon, Harry Warren) - 6:40
3. "Just One of Those Things (Cole Porter) - 6:12
4. "Crazy She Calls Me" (Bob Russell, Carl Sigman) - 4:15
5. "Tico Tico" (Zequinha de Abreu) - 2:44
6. "Weaver of Dreams" (Jack Elliott, Victor Young) - 6:56
7. "The Way You Look Tonight" (Dorothy Fields, Jerome Kern) - 5:18
8. "A Handful of Stars" (Jack Lawrence, Ted Shapiro) - 6:42
9. "Pennies From Heaven" (Arthur Johnston, Johnny Burke) - 5:20
10. "Skylark" (Hoagy Carmichael, Johnny Mercer) - 5:00

- Recorded August 1991 at Sigma Sound, NYC

== Personnel ==
- Paul Motian - drums
- Bill Frisell - electric guitar
- Lee Konitz - alto saxophone
- Joe Lovano - tenor saxophone
- Charlie Haden - bass
