= Live at the Village Vanguard Vol. III =

Live album by Paul Motian
- Released: 8 October 2010
- Recorded: December 8–10, 2006
- Genre: Jazz
- Length: 58: 43
- Label: Winter & Winter
- Producer: Stefan Winter

Paul Motian chronology
Live at the Village Vanguard Vol. II (2008)	Live at the Village Vanguard Vol. III (2010)	Lost in a Dream (2010)

Live at the Village Vanguard Vol. III is a live album by Paul Motian's Trio 2000 + Two, recorded at the Village Vanguard and released by Winter & Winter Records in 2010. It is the final volume of the series, and features tenor saxophonist Chris Potter, double bassist Larry Grenadier, pianist Masabumi Kikuchi and violist Mat Maneri (in place of a second saxophonist).

== Reception ==
Professional ratings
Review scores
Source	Rating
Tom Hull	B+
All About Jazz	4/5 stars
Financial Times	4/5 stars

In a review for All About Jazz, Charles Walker commented: "Volume III finds the band refining its sound, boiling down its book of highly original music from the unfettered antics of past interactions into a more centered whole."

Mike Hobart of the Financial Times wrote that Potter and Maneri "combine warmly on saxophone and cello to bring out the full lyricism of Motian's unhurried themes, and then edge inexorably towards darker-centred improvisation. Motian knowingly orchestrates with subtle adjustments of tension and tempo, his rhythmic swirls, swishy cymbals and spacious beats compelling accompaniment."

== Track listing ==
All compositions by Paul Motian (Yazgol Music, BMI) except as indicated

1. "And So To Sleep Again" - 8:46 (Joe Marsala/Sunny Skylar)
2. "Ten" - 11:10
3. "The Third Walk" - 9:46
4. "The Hoax" - 8:23
5. "Gang of 5" - 11:43
6. "Standard Time" - 8:50

- Recorded at the Village Vanguard in New York City on December 8–10, 2006

== Personnel ==
- Paul Motian - drums
- Chris Potter - tenor saxophone
- Larry Grenadier - double bass
- Masabumi Kikuchi - piano
- Mat Maneri - viola
