= Tribute (Paul Motian album) =

Studio album by Paul Motian
- Released: 1974
- Recorded: May 1974
- Genre: Post-bop, contemporary jazz
- Length: 37:56
- Label: ECM 1048 ST
- Producer: Manfred Eicher

Paul Motian chronology
Conception Vessel (1973)	Tribute (1974)	Dance (1977)

Tribute is an album by American jazz drummer Paul Motian recorded in May 1974 and released on ECM later that year—Motian's second for the label. The quintet features alto saxophonist Carlos Ward, guitarists Paul Metzke and Sam Brown, and bassist Charlie Haden.

== Reception ==
The AllMusic review by Scott Yanow awarded the album 4 stars, stating, "This effort by drummer Paul Motian does not say who the "tribute" is for. Two numbers (the leader's "Victoria" and "Song for Che") feature the trio of guitarist Sam Brown (an underrated player), bassist Charlie Haden and Motian; the remaining three songs (a pair of Motian originals and Ornette Coleman's "War Orphans") add the second guitar of Paul Metzke and the fiery alto of Carlos Ward. Fine post-bop music that contains more energy than many ECM recordings."

The Penguin Guide to Jazz calls the album “a small classic”, noting Motian “plays with grace and composure”, and calling attention to the album's use of guitars, particularly in the context of Motian’s later work with Bill Frisell.

Professional ratings
Review scores
Source	Rating
AllMusic	4/5 stars
The Penguin Guide to Jazz	4/4 stars
Tom Hull	B+

== Track listing ==
All compositions by Paul Motian except as noted

1. "Victoria" – 5:25
2. "Tuesday Ends Saturday" – 6:39
3. "War Orphans" (Ornette Coleman) – 7:28
4. "Sod House" – 9:51
5. "Song for Ché" (Charlie Haden) – 8:33

== Personnel ==
- Paul Motian – drums, percussion
- Carlos Ward – alto saxophone
- Sam Brown – acoustic and electric guitars
- Paul Metzke – electric guitar
- Charlie Haden – bass
