= Paul Motian and the Electric Bebop Band =

Studio album by Paul Motian
- Released: February 25, 1993
- Recorded: April 1992
- Studio: Power Station, New York City
- Genre: Jazz
- Length: 48:23
- Label: JMT
- Producer: Stefan F. Winter

Paul Motian chronology
On Broadway Volume 3 (1991)	Paul Motian and the Electric Bebop Band (1993)	Trioism (1993)

Paul Motian and the Electric Bebop Band is an album of bebop jazz standards by American drummer Paul Motian originally released on the German JMT label. It was the first release by the Electric Bebop Band, which featured the veteran drummer working mainly with younger musicians and which subsequently became one of Motian's primary groups until the end of his life.

Recorded in 1992, it was released in 1993 and features performances by Motian with tenor saxophonist Joshua Redman, guitarists Brad Shepik and Kurt Rosenwinkel, and bass guitarist Stomu Takeishi. The album was rereleased on the Winter & Winter label in 2004.

== Reception ==
The AllMusic review by Scott Yanow awarded the album 4 stars, stating, "these versions are often a bit outside, a touch rock-ish, and quite unpredictable".

Professional ratings
Review scores
Source	Rating
Allmusic	4/5 stars

== Track listing ==
1. "Shaw-Nuff" (Ray Brown, Gil Fuller, Dizzy Gillespie) - 6:05
2. "I Waited for You" (Fuller, Gillespie) - 5:20
3. "Dance of the Infidels" (Bud Powell) - 4:08
4. "Darn That Dream" (Jimmy Van Heusen, Eddie DeLange) - 3:58
5. "Hot House" (Tadd Dameron) - 6:53
6. "Dizzy Atmosphere" (Gillespie) - 2:47
7. "Scrapple from the Apple" (Charlie Parker) - 5:07
8. "Scrapple from the Apple" (Parker) - 5:01
9. "Monk's Dream" (Thelonious Monk) - 6:07
10. "52nd Street Theme" (Monk) - 3:36

- Recorded at the Power Station in New York City in April 1992

== Personnel ==
- Paul Motian - drums
- Joshua Redman - tenor saxophone
- Brad Schoeppach - electric guitar (left side)
- Kurt Rosenwinkel - electric guitar (right side)
- Stomu Takeishi - electric bass
