= A Long Story (Anat Fort album) =

Studio album by Anat Fort
- Released: 19 January 2007
- Recorded: March 2004
- Studio: Systems Two Studio; Brooklyn, NYC
- Genre: Jazz
- Length: 56:50
- Label: ECM; ECM 1994
- Producer: Anat Fort and Manfred Eicher

Anat Fort chronology
| Peel (1999) | A Long Story (2007) | And If (2010) |

A Long Story is an album by pianist and composer Anat Fort recorded in Brooklyn in March 2004 and released on ECM in January 2007. The quartet features Perry Robinson on clarinet and ocarina and rhythm section Ed Schuller and Paul Motian.

== Reception ==
Professional ratings
Review scores
| Source | Rating |
|---|---|
| Allmusic | 5/5 stars |
| PopMatters | 8/10 stars |
| The Penguin Guide to Jazz Recordings | 3/4 stars |

The five star AllMusic review by Stephen Eddins states "Fort sets up a basic cool jazz sound and then strays far enough from the expectations she has created to keep the listener constantly engaged and intrigued... The strong character of each of the players and Fort's slightly offbeat musical material make every piece on this outstanding album a pleasure."

PopMatters correspondent Matt Cibula reflected "It’s pretty seldom that people can turn down the volume on this crazy world and really concentrate on things that really matter. Like comfortable shoes, and good spicy Spanish wine, and brilliant jazz albums like this."

Writing for All About Jazz, Dan McClenaghan noted "A Long Story is one of a handful of albums that can be listened to again and again while revealing different aspects of itself each time. Highly recommended."

Less enthusiastic was the JazzTimes review by Thomas Conrad which observed "Fort is a minimalist. She postulates elemental figures, spare lines that she hopes are suggestive. Such a less-is-more approach requires a special muse, and Fort’s ideas are mostly melodically slight."

== Track listing ==
All compositions by Anat Fort except as indicated

1. "Just Now, Var. I" - 4:14
2. "Morning: Good" - 7:22
3. "The Thusky" - 5:59
4. "Chapter Two" (Anat Fort, Perry Robinson) - 3:43
5. "Just Now, Var. II" - 3:59
6. "Not a Dream?" - 5:24
7. "Rehaired" - 5:55
8. "As Two / Something 'Bout Camels" - 5:52
9. "Not the Perfect Storm" - 7:21
10. "Chapter One" - 4:14
11. "Just Now, Var.PAT. III" - 2:14

== Personnel ==
- Anat Fort – piano
- Perry Robinson – clarinet, ocarina
- Ed Schuller – double bass
- Paul Motian – drums
