= On Broadway Volume 2 =

Studio album by Paul Motian
- Released: 1989
- Recorded: September 1989
- Genre: Jazz
- Length: 43:34
- Label: JMT
- Producer: Stefan F. Winter

Paul Motian chronology
On Broadway Volume 1 (1989)	On Broadway Volume 2 (1989)	Bill Evans (1990)

On Broadway Volume 2 is the fourth album by Paul Motian to be released on the German JMT label. It was released in 1989 and features performances of Broadway show tunes by Motian with guitarist Bill Frisell, bassist Charlie Haden and tenor saxophonist Joe Lovano. The album was followed by three subsequent volumes, and it was rereleased on the Winter & Winter label in 2003.

== Reception ==
The AllMusic review by Stephen Cook awarded the album 4½ stars, stating: "On Broadway, Vol. 2 is not only one of many fine Motian recordings... but it also is a showcase of some of the smartest, most rewarding jazz improvisation of the last couple decades".

Professional ratings
Review scores
Source	Rating
AllMusic	4.5/5 stars
The Penguin Guide to Jazz Recordings	3.5/4 stars

== Track listing ==
1. "Good Morning Heartache" (Irene Higginbotham, Ervin Drake, Dan Fisher) - 4:48
2. "You and the Night and the Music" (Arthur Schwartz, Howard Dietz) - 5:32
3. "Moonlight Becomes You" (Jimmy Van Heusen, Johnny Burke) - 4:38
4. "But Not for Me" (George Gershwin, Ira Gershwin) - 7:22
5. "Oh Bess, Oh Where's My Bess?" (Gershwin, Gershwin, DuBose Heyward) - 4:20
6. "I Got Rhythm" (Gershwin, Gershwin) - 5:23
7. "All the Things You Are" (Oscar Hammerstein II, Jerome Kern) - 7:00
8. "Nice Work If You Can Get It" (Gershwin, Gershwin) - 4:15
9. "It Might as Well Be Spring" (Hammerstein, Richard Rodgers) - 5:51
10. "Look to the Rainbow" (E. Y. Harburg, Burton Lane) - 3:12
11. "Body and Soul" (Edward Heyman, Robert Sour, Frank Eyton, Johnny Green) - 5:45

- Recorded at RPM Sound Studios, New York, New York in September 1989

== Personnel ==
- Paul Motian - drums
- Bill Frisell - electric guitar
- Joe Lovano - tenor saxophone
- Charlie Haden - double bass
