= Marty Cook =

American jazz musician

Marty Cook (born May 1947) is an American jazz trombonist.

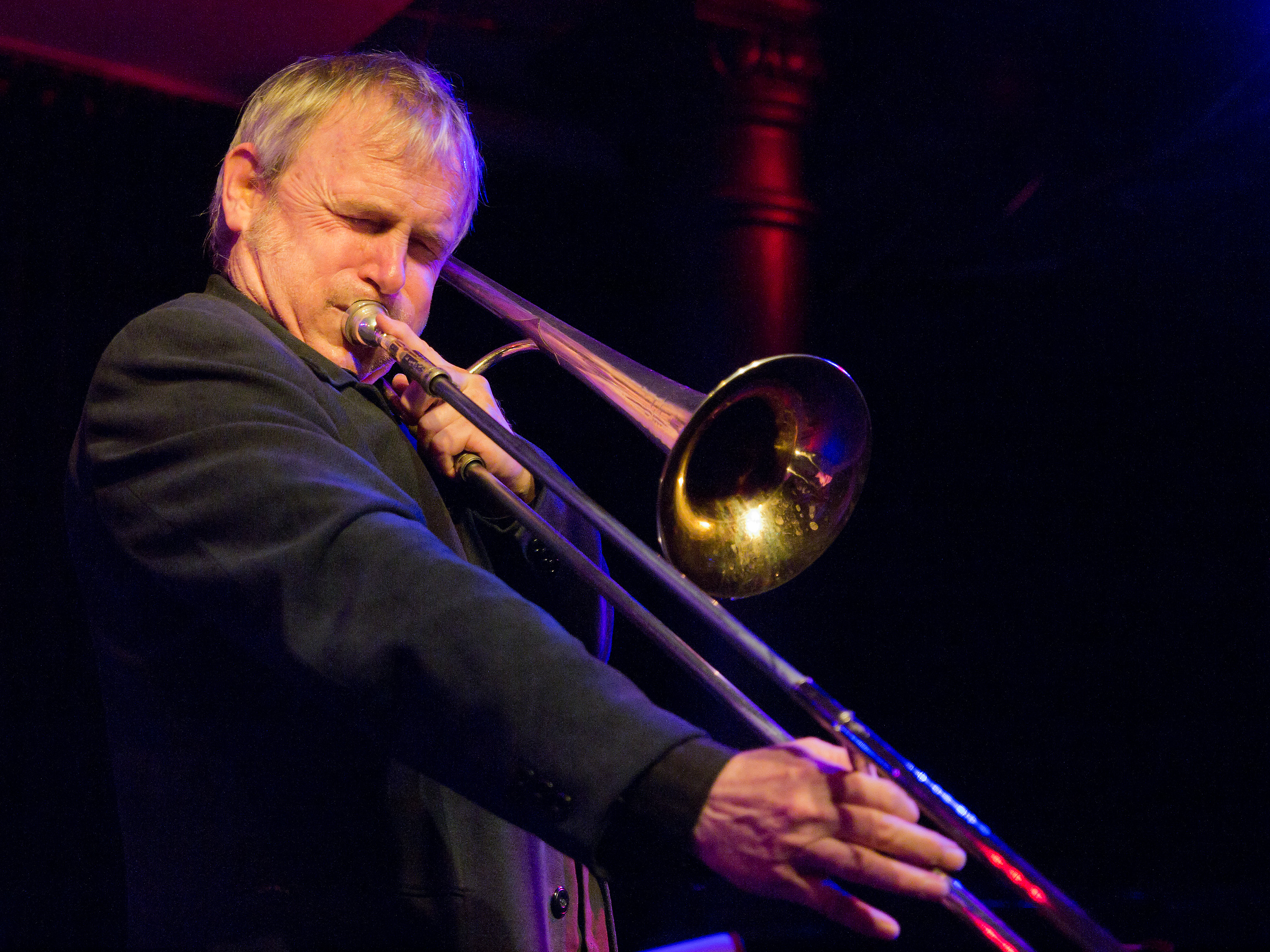
Marty Cook in 2011

== Biography ==
Cook was born in New York and raised in Ohio, where he began playing trombone at age seven. He played in New York in the late 1960s, recording with Marzette Watts in 1968. He played in a rock band in California from 1971 to 1972 and then returned to New York, playing with Sam Rivers and Ted Daniel. He played in Europe in 1973-74 with Gunter Hampel and Jeanne Lee. In 1979, he moved to Munich, touring with his ensemble the New York Sound Explosion. Among the members of the group were Monty Waters, Ratzo Harris, Art Lewis, John Betsch, Jim Pepper, and Essiet Essiet. In the 1980s and 1990s he played with Embryo, Allan Praskin, Günther Klatt (1984), Harry Sokal, and Chris Beier. In the late 1990s he founded the ensemble Conspiracy, alongside Rudi Mahall, Aki Takase, Betsch, and Ed Schuller.

== Discography ==
- 1979: Trance (Circle Records (Germany))
- 1986: Nightwork (Enja Records)
- 1987: Red, White, Black and Blue (Enja)
- 1993: Borderlines (Tutu Records)
- 1994: Phases of the Moon (Tutu)
- 1994: Ibn Battuda with Embryo (Schneeball)
- 1997: Theory of Strange (Enja)
