= The Windmills of Your Mind (Paul Motian album) =

Studio album by Paul Motian
- Released: August 9, 2011
- Recorded: September 2010
- Studio: Sear Sound, New York City
- Genre: Jazz
- Length: 52:13
- Label: Winter & Winter 910 182-2
- Producer: Stefan Winter

Paul Motian chronology
Lost in a Dream (2010)	The Windmills of Your Mind (2011)

The Windmills of Your Mind is an album by Paul Motian released on the German Winter & Winter label in 2011, the final release during his lifetime. It features Motian’s long-standing colleague, guitarist Bill Frisell, bassist Thomas Morgan and vocalist Petra Haden.

== Reception ==
Professional ratings
Review scores
Source	Rating
All About Jazz	5/5 stars
Allmusic	4/5 stars
The Guardian	4/5 stars

The Allmusic review by Thom Jurek stated: "The Windmills of Your Mind is a collection of jazz and pop standards played by a stellar quartet ".

The Guardian's John Fordham observed: "Motian enlists Bill Frisell on guitar and Thomas Morgan on bass to turn the usual glides and smooches of these songs into a lurching, spontaneously contrapuntal undertow, in which the rhythm lies as much in what's not being played as what is".

All About Jazz correspondent Dan Bilawsky commented, "Motian's prolific output makes it easy to occasionally overlook some of his albums, but this one is likely to gain a lot of attention. The Windmills Of Your Mind is simply sublime". JazzTimes's Colin Fleming called the album "a set of pop standards with the deep, well-rounded luxuriousness of modern chamber music, with elements of high-romance. This is jazz as seduction music".

== Track listing ==
All compositions by Paul Motian, except as indicated

1. "Introduction (1)" – 2:23
2. "Tennessee Waltz" (Pee Wee King, Redd Stewart) – 3:46
3. "The Windmills of Your Mind" (Alan Bergman, Marilyn Bergman, Michel Legrand) – 6:34
4. "Let's Face the Music and Dance" (Irving Berlin) – 1:52
5. "Lover Man" (Jimmy Davis, James Sherman, Ram Ramirez) – 3:24
6. "It's Been a Long, Long Time" (Jule Styne, Sammy Cahn) – 2:34
7. "Little Foot" – 2:17
8. "Easy Living" (Leo Robin, Ralph Rainger) – 3:11
9. "I've Got a Crush on You" (George Gershwin, Ira Gershwin) – 2:38
10. "Backup" – 2:28
11. "I Loves You Porgy" (Gershwin, Gershwin) – 3:56
12. "Trieste" – 2:04
13. "If I Could Be With You" (Henry Creamer, James P. Johnson) – 3:12
14. "Wednesday's Gone" – 2:04
15. "I Remember You" (Johnny Mercer, Victor Schertzinger) – 5:39
16. "Introduction (2)" – 3:05

== Personnel ==
- Paul Motian – drums
- Bill Frisell – electric guitar
- Petra Haden – vocals
- Thomas Morgan – bass
