= Le voyage (Paul Motian album) =

Studio album by Paul Motian
- Released: 1 September 1979
- Recorded: March 1979
- Studios: Tonstudio Bauer; Ludwigsburg, West Germany
- Genres: Avant-garde jazz, free jazz, contemporary jazz
- Length: 43:18
- Label: ECM 1138
- Producer: Manfred Eicher

Paul Motian chronology
Dance (1977)	Le voyage (1979)	Psalm (1981)

Le voyage is an album by the Paul Motian Trio, recorded in March 1979 and released on ECM September later that year—Motian's fourth album for the label. The trio features bassist Jean-François Jenny-Clark and saxophonist Charles Brackeen.

== Reception ==
The AllMusic review by Don Snowden stated, "Le Voyage is a very reflective, ruminative disc bordering on chamber jazz and marked by that distinctive ECM sound, clean but very distant. It's top-quality music, but look to Dance for more liveliness and ebullience in this phase of Paul Motian's career."

Professional ratings
Review scores
Source	Rating
AllMusic	4/5 stars
Tom Hull	B+
The Penguin Guide to Jazz Recordings	3/4 stars
The Rolling Stone Jazz Record Guide	3/5 stars
DownBeat	4/5 stars

== Track listing ==
All compositions by Paul Motian

1. "Folk Song for Rosie" - 9:53
2. "Abacus" - 7:16
3. "Cabala/Drum Music" - 6:09
4. "Sunflower" - 8:48
5. "Le Voyage" - 11:12

== Personnel ==
=== Paul Motian Trio ===
- Paul Motian – drums, percussion
- Jean-François Jenny-Clark – bass
- Charles Brackeen – soprano and tenor saxophones
