= Misterioso (Paul Motian album) =

Studio album by Paul Motian
- Released: 1987
- Recorded: July 14–16, 1986
- Genre: Avant-garde jazz, free jazz, contemporary jazz
- Length: 45:15
- Label: Soul Note
- Producer: Giovanni Bonandrini

Paul Motian chronology
It Should've Happened a Long Time Ago (1985)	Misterioso (1987)	One Time Out (1989)

Misterioso is an album by American jazz drummer-composer Paul Motian, his ninth album overall and third on the Italian Soul Note label. It was released in 1987 and features performances by Motian’s quintet with guitarist Bill Frisell, tenor saxophonists Joe Lovano and Jim Pepper, and bassist Ed Schuller.

== Reception ==
The Allmusic review by Scott Yanow awarded the album 4½ stars, stating: "Although often overlooked, drummer Paul Motian led one of the most inventive jazz bands of the mid-1980s. His quintet, which featured the tenors of Joe Lovano and Jim Pepper, guitarist Bill Frisell and bassist Ed Schuller, could play anything from swinging advanced hard bop and Ornette Coleman-type free bop to spacier improvising. An underrated composer, Motian contributed seven of the nine numbers for this date; the quintet also performs Thelonious Monk's "Misterioso" and "Pannonica." Frisell is featured on "Byablue" (which had earlier been recorded by Keith Jarrett); the two tenors (Pepper doubled on soprano) work together quite well, and the band definitely had its own sound. Of its three recordings, this is a strong one to start with.".

Professional ratings
Review scores
Source	Rating
Allmusic	4.5/5 stars
The Penguin Guide to Jazz Recordings	4/4 stars

== Track listing ==
1. "Misterioso" (Monk) - 6:50
2. "Abacus" - 3:30
3. "Once Around the Park" - 6:48
4. "Gang of Five" - 4:28
5. "Pannonica" (Monk) - 3:45
6. "Folk Song for Rosie" - 5:08
7. "Byablue" - 2:20
8. "Dance" - 10:14
9. "Johnny Broken Wing" - 2:12

All compositions by Paul Motian except as indicated

== Personnel ==
- Paul Motian - drums
- Bill Frisell - electric guitar
- Joe Lovano - tenor saxophone
- Jim Pepper - tenor and soprano saxophones
- Ed Schuller - bass
