= Live at Birdland (Lee Konitz album) =

Live album by Lee Konitz
- Released: June 7, 2011
- Recorded: December 9–10, 2009
- Genre: Jazz
- Label: ECM

Live at Birdland is an album by saxophonist Lee Konitz, with pianist Brad Mehldau, bassist Charlie Haden and drummer Paul Motian.

== Background ==
Three of the four musicians on this album – Konitz, Mehldau, and Haden – had recorded together in 1996 and 1997.

== Music and recording ==
All six tracks are standards. The album was recorded at New York's Birdland club on December 9 and 10, 2009. No set list was used; instead, "Konitz or Mehldau would back his way into a classic of his choosing, and the others would join in".

== Critical reception ==
Reviews of the album were mixed. The Daily Telegraph suggested that "Konitz's solos are masterly in their economy, but one senses the other players lowering their voices in respect." John Fordham was enthusiastic, and described it as a "captivating live set".

Professional ratings
Review scores
Source	Rating
AllMusic	2.5/5 stars
The Daily Telegraph	2/5 stars
The Guardian	5/5 stars

== Track listing ==
1. "Lover Man" – 12:05
2. "Lullaby of Birdland" – 12:05
3. "Solar" – 11:39
4. "I Fall in Love Too Easily" – 10:17
5. "You Stepped out of a Dream" – 11:49
6. "Oleo" – 15:19

== Personnel ==
- Lee Konitz – alto sax
- Brad Mehldau – piano
- Charlie Haden – bass
- Paul Motian – drums
