= Notes (album) =

Studio album by Paul Bley and Paul Motian
- Released: 1987
- Recorded: July 3 & 4, 1987
- Genre: Jazz
- Length: 55:08
- Label: Soul Note
- Producer: Giovanni Bonandrini

Paul Bley chronology
Fragments (1986)	Notes (1987)	The Paul Bley Quartet (1987)

Notes is an album by Canadian jazz pianist Paul Bley and American drummer Paul Motian, recorded in 1987 and released on the Italian Soul Note label.

== Reception ==
Professional ratings
Review scores
Source	Rating
AllMusic	3/5 stars
Tom Hull	B+
The Penguin Guide to Jazz	3/4 stars

The AllMusic review by Eugene Chadbourne stated that "the tracks basically having the flatness and relative lack of detail of the album's cover illustration. These performances have a lingering quality, however, certain moments eventually acquiring magic like illuminations, even though it is all mere residue under the fingers of players who seemingly can create beauty in their sleep." The Penguin Guide to Jazz said "Their interplay in the most demanding of improvisational settings is intuitive and perfectly weighted".

== Track listing ==
1. "Notes" (Paul Bley) – 4:16
2. "Batterie" (Carla Bley) – 4:38
3. "Piano Solo No.1" (Paul Bley) – 5:19
4. "West 107th Street" (Paul Motian) – 4:55
5. "Just Us" (Motian) – 4:26
6. "No.3" (Paul Bley) – 4:08
7. "Turns" (Paul Bley) – 4:40
8. "Ballad" (Paul Bley) – 2:31
9. "Excerpt" (Paul Bley) – 2:44
10. "Love Hurts" (Paul Bley) – 4:51
11. "Inside" (Paul Bley) – 5:16
12. "Finale" (Paul Bley) – 3:13
13. "Diane" (Ernö Rapée, Lew Pollack) – 4:11
- Recorded at Barigozzi Studio in Milano, Italy, on July 3 & 4, 1987.

== Personnel ==
- Paul Bley – piano
- Paul Motian – percussion
