= Conception Vessel =

Studio album by Paul Motian
- Released: 1973
- Recorded: November 25–26, 1972
- Genre: Post-bop, free jazz, contemporary jazz
- Length: 41:31
- Label: ECM 1028 ST
- Producer: Manfred Eicher

Paul Motian chronology
Conception Vessel (1973)	Tribute (1974)

Conception Vessel is the debut album by American jazz drummer Paul Motian, recorded over two days in November 1972 and released on ECM the following year, featuring performances from pianist Keith Jarrett (also featured on flute), bassist Charlie Haden, violinist Leroy Jenkins, guitarist Sam Brown and flautist Becky Friend.

== Reception ==
The AllMusic review by Ron Wynn awarded the album 4 stars, stating, "This is Motian's debut as a leader. It includes ambitious cuts with guitarist Sam Brown and also features pianist Keith Jarrett."

Professional ratings
Review scores
Source	Rating
AllMusic	4/5 stars
The Penguin Guide to Jazz	3/4 stars
Tom Hull	B+

== Track listing ==
All compositions by Paul Motian

1. "Georgian Bay" – 7:31
2. "Ch'i Energy" – 2:37
3. "Rebica" – 11:14
4. "Conception Vessel" – 7:46
5. "American Indian: Song of Sitting Bull" – 2:45
6. "Inspiration from a Vietnamese Lullaby" – 9:41

== Personnel ==
- Paul Motian – drums, percussion
- Keith Jarrett – piano (4), flute (5)
- Sam Brown – guitar (1, 3)
- Leroy Jenkins – violin (6)
- Becky Friend – flute (6)
- Charlie Haden – bass (1, 3, 6)
