= Dance (Paul Motian album) =

Studio album by the Paul Motian Trio
- Released: 1978
- Recorded: September 1977
- Genre: Post-bop, free jazz, contemporary jazz
- Length: 39:19
- Label: ECM 1108 ST
- Producer: Manfred Eicher

Paul Motian chronology
Tribute (1974)	Dance (1978)	Le voyage (1979)

Dance is an album by the Paul Motian Trio recorded in September 1977 and released on ECM the following year. The trio features saxophonist Charles Brackeen and bassist David Izenzon.

== Reception ==
Professional ratings
Review scores
Source	Rating
AllMusic	4.5/5 stars
The Penguin Guide to Jazz Recordings	3.5/4 stars

The AllMusic review by Scott Yanow awarded the album 4½ stars, stating, "Although drummer Paul Motian is the leader of this trio set with the brilliant bassist David Izenzon, it is Charles Brackeen, heard on tenor and soprano, who is generally the solo star. Motian's six originals (which include "Waltz Song," "Kalypso," "Asia" and "Lullaby") contain plenty of variety and generally live up to their titles."

== Track listing ==
All tracks are written by Paul Motian.

Side I
No.	Title	Length
1.	"Waltz Song"	7:07
2.	"Dance"	7:25
3.	"Kalypso"	4:17
Total length:		18:49

Side II
No.	Title	Length
1.	"Asia"	7:40
2.	"Prelude"	6:50
3.	"Lullaby"	5:59
Total length:		20:29 39:19

== Personnel ==
=== Paul Motian Trio ===
- Charles Brackeen – soprano saxophone, tenor saxophone
- David Izenzon – double bass
- Paul Motian – drums, percussion
