= Jack of Clubs (album) =

Studio album by Paul Motian
- Released: 1985
- Recorded: March 26–28, 1984
- Genre: Avant-garde jazz, free jazz, downtown music
- Length: 40:23
- Label: Soul Note
- Producer: Giovanni Bonandrini

Paul Motian chronology
The Story of Maryam (1984)	Jack of Clubs (1985)	It Should've Happened a Long Time Ago (1985)

Jack of Clubs is an album by American drummer Paul Motian, his second to be released on the Italian Soul Note label. It was released in 1985 and like his previous Soul Note album features performances by Motian with guitarist Bill Frisell, tenor saxophonists Joe Lovano and Jim Pepper, and bassist Ed Schuller.

== Reception ==
The Allmusic Review by Scott Yanow states: "The drummer's seven originals feature lots of variety in moods, ranging from witty to introspective and showcasing the colorful players at their best".

Professional ratings
Review scores
Source	Rating
Allmusic	4/5 stars
The Penguin Guide to Jazz Recordings	3/4 stars

== Track listing ==
All compositions by Paul Motian

1. "Jack of Clubs" - 6:50
2. "Cathedral Song" - 8:32
3. "Split Decision" - 6:05
4. "Hide and Go Seek" - 4:26
5. "Lament" - 4:45
6. "Tanner Street" - 3:21
7. "Drum Music" - 6:24

- Recorded 26–28 March 1984 at Barigozzi Studio, Milano

== Personnel ==
- Paul Motian - drums
- Bill Frisell - electric guitar
- Joe Lovano - tenor saxophone
- Jim Pepper - tenor saxophone, soprano saxophone
- Ed Schuller - bass
