= Anat Fort =

Israeli jazz, pianist and composer

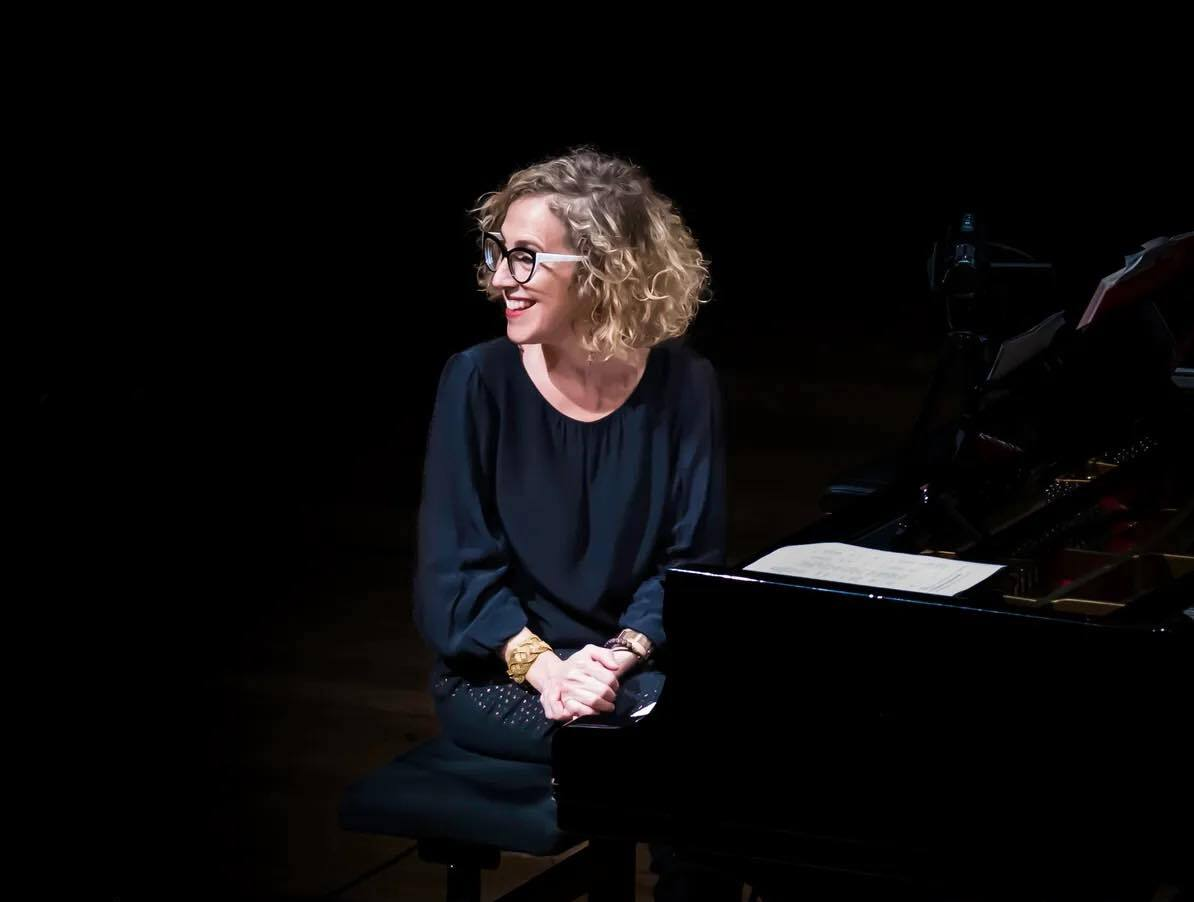
Anat Fort by Yoel Levy

Anat Fort (Hebrew: ענת פורט; born March 8, 1970, near Tel Aviv) is an Israeli jazz pianist and composer who has recorded several acclaimed albums and performed across Europe and the United States.

Fort studied music at William Paterson University in New Jersey and moved to New York in 1996 to develop her skills in jazz improvisation under the guidance of pianist Paul Bley and study composition with Harold Seletsky before releasing her debut self-produced album Peel in 1999. Her first album for ECM Records, A Long Story (2007) arose from an association with drummer Paul Motian. This was followed by the first album by her regular working group - the Anat Fort Trio, And If, in 2010.

== Discography ==
- Peel (Orchard, 1999)
- A Long Story (ECM, 2007)
- And If (ECM, 2010)
- Birdwatching (ECM, 2016), with Anat Fort Trio featuring Gianluigi Trovesi
- Bubbles (Hypnote Records, 2019), with Lieven Venken & Rene Hart
- Colour (Sunnyside Records, 2019), with Anat Fort Trio
- The Berlin Sessions (Sunnyside Records, 2023), with Anat Fort Trio
- The Dreamworld of Paul Motian (Sunnyside Records, 2025) with Steve Cardenas, Gary Wang and Matt Wilson
