= One Time Out =

Studio album by Paul Motian
- Released: 1989
- Recorded: September 21–22, 1987
- Genre: Avant-garde jazz, free jazz, contemporary jazz
- Length: 49:19
- Label: Soul Note
- Producer: Giovanni Bonandrini

Paul Motian chronology
Misterioso (1987)	One Time Out (1989)	Monk in Motian (1988)

One Time Out is the fifth album by Paul Motian on the Italian Soul Note label. It was released in 1989 and features performances by Motian’s trio with guitarist Bill Frisell and tenor saxophonist Joe Lovano.

== Reception ==
The AllMusic review by Scott Yanow stated that "it is the basic sound of the unique group that makes the CD of great interest".

Professional ratings
Review scores
Source	Rating
AllMusic	4/5 stars
The Encyclopedia of Popular Music	4/5 stars
The Penguin Guide to Jazz Recordings	3/4 stars

== Track listing ==
1. "One Time Out" - 5:48
2. "If You Could See Me Now" (Dameron, Sigman) - 5:25
3. "For the Love of Sarah" - 4:23
4. "The Storyteller" - 5:04
5. "Portrait of T." - 5:06
6. "Morpion" - 5:54
7. "Monk's Mood" (Monk) - 7:34
8. "Good Idea" - 4:22
9. "Circle Dance" - 5:43

All compositions by Paul Motian except as indicated
- Recorded 21–22 September 1987 at Barigozzi Studio, Milano

== Personnel ==
- Paul Motian - drums
- Bill Frisell - electric guitar
- Joe Lovano - tenor saxophone
