= Psalm (Paul Motian album) =

Studio album by the Paul Motian Band
- Released: 1982
- Recorded: December 1981
- Studio: Tonstudio Bauer; Ludwigsburg, W. Germany
- Genre: Avant-garde jazz; downtown music
- Length: 44:44
- Label: ECM; ECM 1222
- Producer: Manfred Eicher

Paul Motian chronology
Le voyage (1979)	Psalm (1982)	The Story of Maryam (1984)

Psalm is an album by the Paul Motian Band recorded in December 1981 and released on ECM June the following year—Motian's fifth album for the label and first with the quintet, featuring guitarist Bill Frisell, bassist Ed Schuller, and saxophonists Joe Lovano and Billy Drewes.

== Reception ==
The AllMusic review by Scott Yanow states, "The eight compositions by drummer Paul Motian on this ECM release (which is available on CD) are rather dry and none caught on as future standards. But the playing by Motian's sidemen (tenors Joe Lovano and Billy Drewes, bassist Ed Schuller and especially the remarkable guitarist Bill Frisell) uplifted the music and gave this group a strong personality of its own. Although the results are not all that memorable, the music should please adventurous listeners."

Professional ratings
Review scores
Source	Rating
AllMusic	4.5/5 stars
Tom Hull	B+
The Penguin Guide to Jazz Recordings	3/4 stars
The Rolling Stone Jazz Record Guide	3/5 stars

== Track listing ==
All tracks are written by Paul Motian.

Side I
No.	Title	Length
1.	"Psalm"	6:57
2.	"White Magic"	3:00
3.	"Boomerang"	5:43
4.	"Fantasm"	6:07

Side II
No.	Title	Length
1.	"Mandeville"	5:03
2.	"Second Hand"	9:16
3.	"Etude"	4:16
4.	"Yahllah"	7:39

== Personnel ==
=== Paul Motian Band ===
- Paul Motian – drums
- Bill Frisell – electric guitar
- Ed Schuller – bass
- Joe Lovano – tenor saxophone
- Billy Drewes – tenor and alto saxophones
