= Russ Lossing =

American jazz pianist and composer

- Born: 1960 (age 65–66); Ohio, U.S.
- Origin: Columbus, Ohio, U.S.
- Genres: Jazz
- Occupations: Musician, composer, arranger
- Instruments: Piano, keyboards
- Years active: 1970s–present
- Website: russlossing.com

Russ Lossing (born 1960) is an American jazz pianist, composer, improviser, arranger, educator, and scholar.

== Early life ==
Lossing was born in Ohio in 1960, and is from Columbus, Ohio. He had classical piano lessons from the age of 5 and began studying jazz aged 13 in Columbus at the Jazz and Contemporary Workshop with Dave Wheeler. He obtained a Bachelor of Music in piano at Ohio State University in 1986. Meetings with composer John Cage had a big effect:

We only had two occasions to get together and talk, but any time spent with him was utterly valuable. He read through my scores we played piano together. His thing was creating, not emulating: don't copy; trust YOURSELF. I was already going in this direction but this experience, listening to Cage's concepts and philosophy in this setting, made so much sense.

== Later life and career ==
Lossing has been part of the New York jazz scene since 1986. In 1988 he earned a Master of Music from the Manhattan School of Music. He has led or co-led numerous bands, including: his own trio with Masa Kamaguchi and Billy Mintz; Three-Part Invention with bassist Mark Helias and trumpeter Ralph Alessi; and duos with saxophonist Tim Berne, drummer Gerry Hemingway, and guitarist Ben Monder. Others are: trio with Paul Motian and Ed Schuller (Dreamer and As It Grows); trio with Mat Maneri and Mark Dresser (Metal Rat); trio with John Hebert and Jeff Williams (Phrase 6); quartet with Loren Stillman, John Hebert and Eric McPherson (Personal Tonal); King Vulture with Adam Kolker, Matt Pavolka and Dayeon Seok; and duos with saxophonist Loren Stillman, bassist John Hebert (Line Up, Hatology), and saxophonist Michael Adkins.

Lossing played with drummer Paul Motian over a period of 12 years and recorded Drum Music, a solo piano tribute album to him in 2011. The JazzTimes reviewer of Drum Music commented that "his two-fisted takes on 'Fiasco', 'Dance' and 'Drum Music' capture the great drummer's unpredictable and audacious rhythmic pulse. Lossing's stark re-imaginings of [... other Motian pieces] all vibrate with a new spirit of exploration."

Lossing has composed over 400 pieces of music. In 2015, he founded the record label Aqua Piazza.

== Playing style ==
Scott Yanow, reviewing Lossing's As It Grows, commented that the pianist "is influenced by modern classical music to an extent but his playing is not unremittingly atonal. Instead, he leaves his impressionistic music open to all possibilities, mostly emphasizing dramatic ideas and unexpected silences."

Lossing said of his own style: "Much 20th century composition is about interval play, especially Bartok and Schoenberg's. The 12-tone thing helped him to get his ideas onto paper, but it was always about the intervals. I'm a jazz pianist but my harmonic approach is based on this concept – finding new sounds and new expressions among the intervals."

== Discography ==
An asterisk (*) indicates that the year is that of release.

=== As leader/co-leader ===
Year recorded	Title	Label	Personnel/Notes
1990	Blue Alien	Soho No How	Trio, with Ed Schuller (bass), Peter LeMaitre (drums)
1999*	Change of Time	OmniTone	Trio, with Adam Kolker (tenor sax, bass clarinet), John Hébert (bass)
2000*	Dreamer	DoubleTime	Trio, with Ed Schuller (bass), Paul Motian (drums)
2000	Metal Rat	Clean Feed	Trio, with Mat Maneri (viola), Mark Dresser (bass)
2002	As It Grows	HatOLOGY	Trio, with Ed Schuller (bass), Paul Motian (drums)
2004	Phrase 6	Fresh Sound	Trio, with John Hébert (bass), Jeff Williams (drums)
2005	All Things Arise	HatOLOGY	Solo piano
2006	Line Up	HatOLOGY	Duo, with John Hébert (bass)
2007	Oracle	HatOLOGY	Trio, with Masa Kamaguchi (bass), Billy Mintz (drums)
2009	Personal Tonal	Fresh Sound	Quartet, with Loren Stillman (alto sax), John Hébert (bass) Eric McPherson (drums)
2011	Drum Music: Music of Paul Motian	Sunnyside	Solo piano
2012	Eclipse: Solo Piano Improvisations	Aqua Piazza	Solo piano
2018?	Whispers and Secrets	Fresh Sound	Co-led with Adam Kolker (sax); with Masa Kamaguchi (bass), Billy Mintz (drums)
2019?	Motian Music	Sunnyside	Trio, with Masa Kamaguchi (bass), Billy Mintz (drums)
2020?	Metamorphism	Sunnyside	Quartet, with Loren Stillman (alto sax), John Hébert (bass), Michael Sarin (drums)
2019	Changes	SteepleChase	Trio with Michael Formanek (bass), Gerald Cleaver (drums)
2020	Mood Suite	SteepleChase	Trio with Mark Helios (bass), Eric McPherson (drums)

=== As sideman (partial list) ===
Year recorded	Leader	Title	Label
1997	Loren Stillman	Cosmos	Soul Note
2003	Loren Stillman	Gin Bon	FSNT
2003	Loren Stillman	How Sweet It Is	Nagel-Heyer
2003	John O'Gallagher	Arabesque Records AJ0164	Abacus
2007	Michael Adkins	Rotator	hatOLOGY
2008	Michael Attias	Live in Coimbra	Cleanfeed
2010	Michael Adkins	Flaneur	hatOLOGY (released Jan 2018)
2011*	Samuel Blaser	Consort in Motion	Kind of Blue
2012*	Michael Bates	Acrobat: Music for, and by, Dmitri Shostakovich	Sunnyside
2012*	Jeff Davis	Leaf House	Fresh Sound New Talent
2013*	Michael Bates and Samuel Blaser	One from None	Fresh Sound New Talent
2013	Samuel Blaser	A Mirror to Machaut	Songlines
2013	John O'Gallagher	Anton Webern Project	Whirlwind
2014	Jeff Davis	Dragon Father	FSNT
2014	Kirk Knuffke	Chorale	SteepleChase
2015	Samuel Blaser	Spring Rain	Whirlwind
2017*	Lena Bloch	Heart Knows	Fresh Sound New Talent
2018	Kirk Knuffke	Witness	SteepleChase
2018	Samuel Blaser	Early in the Mornin'	OutNote Records
