= The Story of Maryam =

Studio album by Paul Motian
- Released: 1984
- Recorded: July 27–28, 1983
- Genre: Avant-garde jazz, free jazz, contemporary jazz
- Length: 38:33
- Label: Soul Note
- Producer: Giovanni Bonandrini

Paul Motian chronology
Psalm (1982)	The Story of Maryam (1984)	Jack of Clubs (1985)

The Story of Maryam is the first album by Paul Motian to be released on the Italian Soul Note label. It was released in 1984 and features performances by Motian with guitarist Bill Frisell, tenor saxophonists Joe Lovano and Jim Pepper, and bassist Ed Schuller.

== Reception ==
The Allmusic review awarded the album 4½ stars.

Professional ratings
Review scores
Source	Rating
Allmusic	4.5/5 stars
The Penguin Guide to Jazz Recordings	3/4 stars

== Track listing ==
1. "9 x 9" - 7:10
2. "5 Miles to Wrentham" - 4:54
3. "The Owl of Cranston" - 8:15
4. "Trieste" - 5:45
5. "Look to the Black Wall" - 6:42
6. "The Story of Maryam" - 5:47

All compositions by Paul Motian
- Recorded July 27&28, 1983 Milan, Italy

== Personnel ==
- Paul Motian - drums
- Bill Frisell - electric guitar
- Joe Lovano - tenor saxophone
- Jim Pepper - tenor and soprano saxophones
- Ed Schuller - bass
