= Lost in a Dream (Paul Motian album) =

Live album by Paul Motian
- Released: 19 March 2010
- Recorded: February 2009
- Venue: Village Vanguard; New York City
- Genre: Jazz
- Length: 51:45
- Label: ECM; ECM 1992
- Producer: Manfred Eicher

Paul Motian chronology
Live at the Village Vanguard Vol. III (2010)	Lost in a Dream (2010)	The Windmills of Your Mind (2011)

Lost in a Dream is a live album by jazz drummer Paul Motian, recorded at the Village Vanguard in February 2009 and released on ECM the following year. It features tenor saxophonist Chris Potter and pianist Jason Moran.

== Reception ==
Professional ratings
Review scores
Source	Rating
The Guardian	4/5 stars
PopMatters	9/10 stars
AllAboutJazz	4.5/5 stars
The Jazz Mann	4/5 stars
The Financial Times	4/5 stars

Writing for The Guardian, jazz critic John Fordham noted that Lost in a Dream reveals Motian's trio to "demonstrate sublime improvising musicianship" and "flawless creative listening at once." This symbiosis between musicians was similarly highlighted by reviews in PopMatters, AllAboutJazz and The Jazz Mann, with John Kelman describing Lost in a Dream to be the work of Motian's "empathic new trio." The Jazz Mann considered Lost in a Dream to be a superb example of contemporary improvised music in which "the empathy between the three protagonists is of the highest order", producing an album of "supreme beauty with a controlled power and a keen musical intelligence." In his review for PopMatters, Will Layman suggested that Lost in a Dream "should rank highly" within Motian's extensive repertoire recorded works, reporting that the trio's "combination of balladry and excitement, texture and melody, individual personality and group simpatico makes Lost in a Dream a serious standout."

Laura Marín Bertomeu, in a monograph on the ECM discography observed that reflections on Motian's collective body of work since his death have concluded that the musical intelligence and 'empathy' on display makes Lost in a Dream one of his finest recordings.

== Track listing ==
All compositions by Paul Motian except as indicated

1. "Mode VI" – 5:09
2. "Casino" – 8:05
3. "Lost in a Dream" – 6:39
4. "Blue Midnight" – 6:09
5. "Be Careful It's My Heart" (Irving Berlin) – 2:58
6. "Birdsong" – 6:52
7. "Ten" – 4:29
8. "Drum Music" – 6:07
9. "Abacus" – 4:25
10. "Cathedral Song" – 6:29

== Personnel ==
=== Paul Motian Trio ===
- Paul Motian – drums
- Chris Potter – tenor saxophone
- Jason Moran – piano
