= Paul Motian =

American jazz drummer, percussionist, and composer (1931–2011)

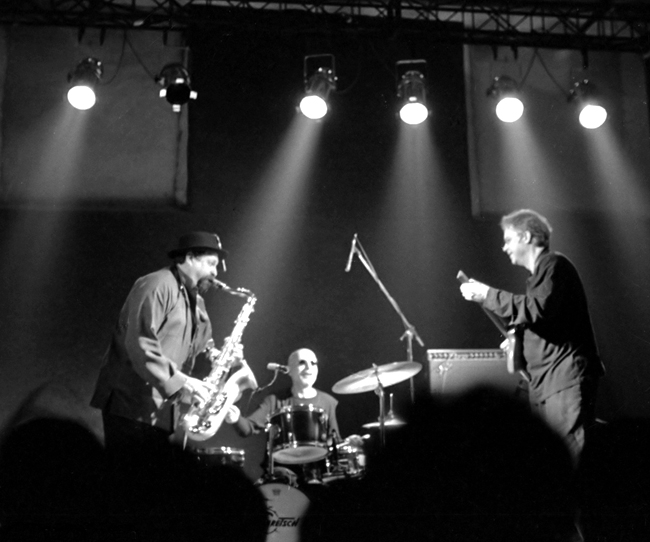
- From left: Joe Lovano, Motian, and Bill Frisell in Rome, c. 2010

Background information
- Born: Stephen Paul Motian; March 25, 1931; Philadelphia, Pennsylvania, U.S.
- Origin: Providence, Rhode Island, U.S.
- Died: November 22, 2011 (aged 80) Manhattan, New York, U.S.
- Genres: Jazz; bebop; hard bop; post-bop; avant-garde jazz; free improvisation
- Occupations: Musician; composer; bandleader
- Instruments: Drums; percussion
- Years active: 1954–2010
- Labels: ECM; Soul Note; JMT; Winter & Winter

Stephen Paul Motian (March 25, 1931 – November 22, 2011) was an American jazz drummer, percussionist, and composer. He played an important role in freeing jazz drummers from strict time-keeping duties.

Motian first came to prominence in the late 1950s in the piano trio of Bill Evans, later was a regular in pianist Keith Jarrett's band for about a decade (c. 1967–1976), and began his career as a bandleader in the early 1970s. Perhaps his two most notable groups were a longstanding trio with guitarist Bill Frisell and saxophonist Joe Lovano as well as the Electric Bebop Band, in which he worked mostly with younger musicians on interpretations of bebop standards.

== Biography ==
Paul Motian was born in Philadelphia, Pennsylvania, United States, and raised in Providence, Rhode Island. He was of Armenian descent. After playing guitar in his childhood, Motian began playing the drums at age 12, eventually touring New England in a swing band. During the Korean War, he joined the U.S. Navy and attended the United States Naval School of Music in Washington, D.C., until 1954. He also attended the Manhattan School of Music.

Motian became a professional musician in 1954 and briefly played with pianist Thelonious Monk. He became well known as the drummer in pianist Bill Evans's trio (1959–64), initially alongside bassist Scott LaFaro, and later with Chuck Israels.

Subsequently, he played with pianists Paul Bley (1963–64) and Keith Jarrett (1967–76). Other musicians with whom Motian performed and/or recorded with in the early period of his career include Lennie Tristano, Warne Marsh, Lee Konitz, Joe Castro, Arlo Guthrie (Motian performed briefly with Guthrie in 1968–69, including at Woodstock), Carla Bley, Charlie Haden, and Don Cherry. Motian subsequently worked with musicians such as Marilyn Crispell, Bill Frisell, Leni Stern, Joe Lovano, Gonzalo Rubalcaba, Alan Pasqua, Bill McHenry, Stéphan Oliva, Frank Kimbrough, Eric Watson, and many others.

Later in his career, Motian became an important composer and group leader, recording initially for ECM Records in the 1970s and early 1980s and then for Soul Note, JMT, and Winter & Winter before returning to ECM in 2005. From the early 1980s, he led a trio featuring guitarist Bill Frisell and saxophonist Joe Lovano, occasionally joined by bassists Ed Schuller, Charlie Haden, or Marc Johnson, and other musicians, including Jim Pepper, Lee Konitz, Dewey Redman, and Geri Allen. In addition to playing Motian's compositions, the group recorded tributes to Thelonious Monk and Bill Evans, and a series of Paul Motian on Broadway albums, featuring original interpretations of jazz standards.

Despite his important associations with pianists, Motian's work as a leader since the 1970s rarely included a pianist in his ensembles and relied heavily on guitarists. Motian's first instrument was the guitar, and he apparently retained an affinity for the instrument: in addition to his groups with Frisell, his first two solo albums on ECM featured Sam Brown, and his Electric Bebop Band featured two and occasionally three electric guitars. The group was founded in the early 1990s, and featured a variety of young guitar and saxophone players.

In 2011, Motian was featured on a number of new recordings, including Live at Birdland (with Lee Konitz, Brad Mehldau, and Charlie Haden), Samuel Blaser's Consort in Motion, No Comment by Augusto Pirodda, and Further Explorations with Chick Corea and Eddie Gómez. Bill McHenry's Ghosts of the Sun was released—by coincidence—on the day of Motian's death. Motian's final album as bandleader was The Windmills of Your Mind, featuring Bill Frisell, Thomas Morgan, and Petra Haden.

== Death ==
Motian died on November 22, 2011, at the age of 80, at New York's Mount Sinai Hospital of complications from myelodysplastic syndrome.

== Box set releases ==
CAM Jazz released a box set titled Paul Motian in September 2010. This release compiles a number of albums which were originally issued by the Soul Note label: The Story of Maryam, Jack of Clubs, Misterioso, Notes (with Paul Bley), One Time Out (with Bill Frisell and Joe Lovano) and Flux and Change (duet with Enrico Pieranunzi).

In November 2012, Winter & Winter released Paul Motian on Broadway Vol. 1, 2, 3, 4, 5 which collects the five volumes of On Broadway into a single set.

ECM Records released a box set titled Paul Motian in April 2013, as part of the label's continuing Old & New Masters Edition series. This set compiles the six albums that Motian recorded for ECM between 1972 and 1984: Conception Vessel, Tribute, Dance, Le voyage, Psalm, and It Should've Happened a Long Time Ago.

== Posthumous releases ==
The first posthumous release to feature Motian was Sunrise by the Masabumi Kikuchi Trio (with Thomas Morgan), released in March 2012 by ECM. This was followed in July 2012 by Owls Talk by Alexandra Grimal (also featuring Lee Konitz and Gary Peacock), released by Harmonia Mundi.

Two live recordings, led by pianist Enrico Pieranunzi, have been released by CAM Jazz; New York Reflections: Live at Birdland (with Steve Swallow) was released in October 2012 (exclusively in vinyl format), while Live at the Village Vanguard (with Marc Johnson) was issued in March 2013.

CAM Jazz reissued One Time Out in March 2013, in 180 g vinyl format. A compact disc edition is supplied with it. One Time Out was also issued on CD as part of the CAM Jazz Paul Motian box set.

In 2023, Frozen Reeds released Duo in Concert, recordings of Motian freely improvising with Derek Bailey, from their two known live performances.

== Motian compositions recorded by others and tributes ==
Motian Sickness – The Music of Paul Motian (for the Love of Sarah) was released in September 2011, featuring Jeff Cosgrove, John Hebert, Mat Maneri, and Jamie Masefield.

November 2011 saw the release of Joel Harrison's String Choir: The Music of Paul Motian. Harrison arranged Motian's music for a string quartet (featuring Christian Howes, Sam Bardfeld, Mat Maneri, and Dana Leong), plus two guitars (Liberty Ellman and Harrison).

Russ Lossing's Drum Music: Music of Paul Motian (Solo Piano) was released in July 2012 by Sunnyside Records. Lossing originally recorded the album to celebrate Motian's 80th birthday; he published a video on YouTube about the recording.

Ravi Coltrane included the Motian composition "Fantasm" on his 2012 album Spirit Fiction. The performance features Joe Lovano.

Noël Akchoté independently released Fiasco (Plays the Music of Paul Motian) in July 2015, exclusively in digital format. It features solo acoustic guitar arrangements of twenty Motian compositions.

In 2016, Jean-Marc Padovani released Motian in Motion via Naïve Jazz.

In 2018, the Carl Michel Group released Music in Motian via Play On Records.

In 2020, Haşmet Asilkan arranged the songs of Motian for solo guitar and released them under the title Paul Motian Songbook.
