= Hilmar Jensson =

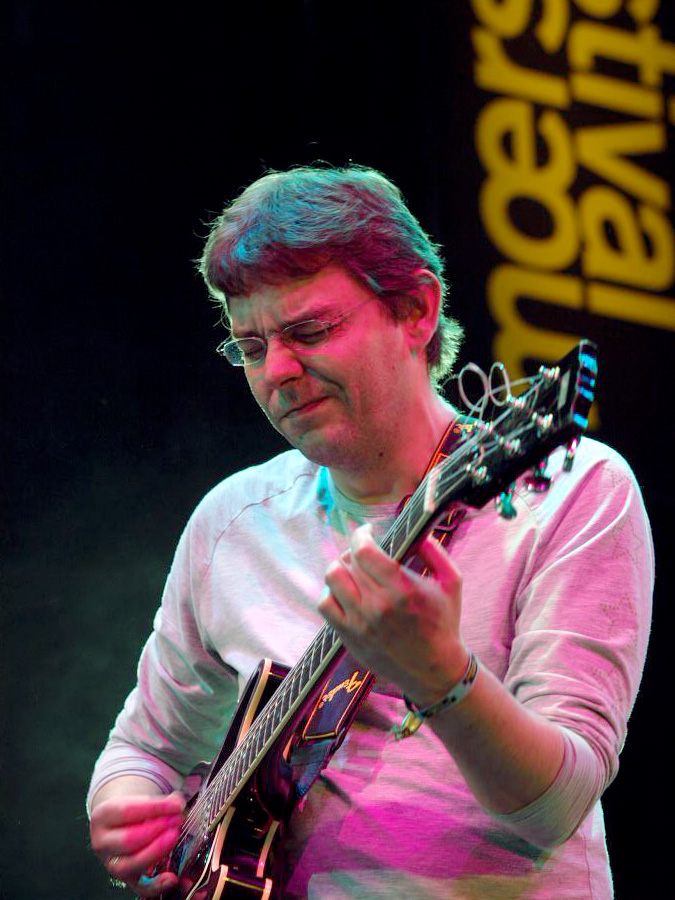
- Jensson at the 2008 Moers Festival

Background information
- Born: 1966 (age 58–59); Reykjavík, Iceland
- Genres: Jazz, electronic music
- Occupation: Musician
- Instrument: Guitar
- Website: hilmarjensson.com

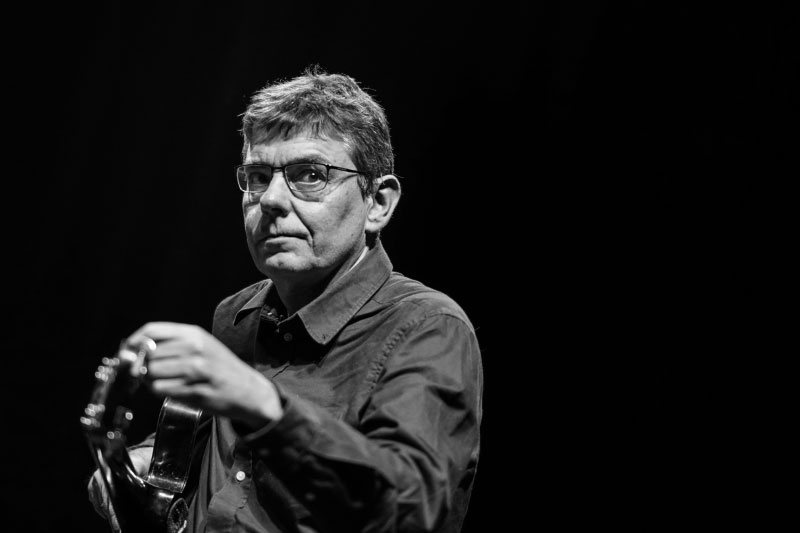
Hilmar Jensson (2018) in Aarhus, Denmark

Hilmar Jensson (born 1966) is an Icelandic guitarist.

== Biography ==
Hilmar picked up the guitar at a young age. He studied at the FIH music school in Iceland from 1982 and then in 1991 attended the Berklee College of Music, in Boston. During this time he took in private lessons with Mick Goodrick, Jerry Bergonzi, and Hal Crook.

He then returned to Iceland, but from 1993 to 1994 he studied with Joe Lovano in New York. As sideman he has collaborated with Tim Berne, Wadada Leo Smith, Kevin Drumm, Herb Robertson, Trevor Dunn, Greg Bendian, Chris Speed, Briggan Krauss, Jamie Saft, Cuong Vu, Rafael Toral, Carlos Zingaro, Tom Rainey, Ben Perowsky, Per Jørgensen, Eyvind Kang, Arve Henriksen and Ståle Storløkken, among others.

In 1999 Jensson joined Jim Black in the band AlasNoAxis. In 2001, he founded the New York band 'Tyft' together with Jim Black and Andrew D'Angelo. He was also a founding member of the artist collective Kitchen Motors, an Icelandic that also acts as a record label.

== Discography ==
=== Solo albums ===
- 1995: Dofinn (Jazzís)
- 1999: Kerfill (Smekkleysa)
- 2004: Ditty Blei (Songlines)

With 'Tyft' trio including Andrew D'Angelo and Jim Black

- 2002: Tyft (Songlines)
- 2004: Smell The Difference (Skirl)
- 2006: Meg Nem Sa (Skirl)

=== Collaborations ===
With Kjartan Ólafsson

- 1997: Thrír Heimar í Einum (Smekkleysa)
- 2000: Völuspá (Erkitíð)

With Óskar Gudjónsson

- 1997: Far (Steinar)

With Kjartan Valdemarsson, Matthías M.D. Hemstock, and Pétur Grétarsson

- 1998: Traust (Smekkleysa)

With 'Didda'

- 1998: Strokid og slegid (Bad Taste)

With Jóel Pálsson

- 1998: Prím (Naxos)
- 2001: Klif (Omi)
- 2008: Varp (Flugur)

With Skúli Sverrisson

- 1998: Kjár (Smekkleysa)
- 2002: Napoli 23 (Smekkleysa)
- 2007: Seria (12 Tónar)

With VA

- 1999: Nart Nibbles (Kitchen Motors)
- 2001: Motorlab 1 (Kitchen Motors)
- 2001: Strings And Stings (Kitchen Motors), with Rafael Toral

With Terje Isungset

- 2000: Floating Rhythms (Via Music)
- 2002: Iceman Is (Jazzland)

With Óskar Gudjónsson

- 2000: Delerad (M&M)

With Jim Black's AlasNoAxis

- 2000: Alasnoaxis (Winter & Winter)
- 2002: Splay (Winter & Winter)
- 2004: Habyor (Winter & Winter)
- 2006: Dogs of Great Indifference (Winter & Winter)
- 2009: Houseplant (Winter & Winter)
- 2013: Antiheroes (Winter & Winter)

With Tomas R. Einarsson

- 2002: Kubanska (Omi)

With Unn Patterson

- 2003: Run (Tutl)

With 'Yeah No'

- 2004: Swell Henry (Squealer)

With Jóhann Jóhannsson

- 2005: Dis (12 Tónar)

With 'Kira Kira'

- 2008: Our Map of the Monster Olympics (Bad Taste)

With 'Mógil'

- 2008: Ró (Radical Duke Entertainment)
- 2011: Í Stillunni Hljómar (Mógil Music)

With Trevor Dunn's MadLove

- 2009: White With Foam (Ipecac)

With 'Outhouse'

- 2011: Straw, Sticks + Bricks (Babel)

With Ruben Machtelinckx, Joachim Badenhorst, and Nathan Wouters

- 2011: Faerge (El Negocito)
- 2014: Flock (El Negocito)

With Bly De Blyant

- 2013: ABC (Hubro)
- 2014: Hindsight Bias (Hubro)
- 2016: The Third Bly De Blyant Album (Hubro)
