= Skirl Records =

Skirl Records is an American record label in Brooklyn, New York, that concentrates on improvised music. The label was started by Chris Speed in 2006.

== Roster ==
- Jim Black
- Shelley Burgon
- Anthony Burr
- Andrew D'Angelo
- Trevor Dunn
- Devin Gray
- Mary Halvorson
- Curtis Hasselbring
- Arnold Hammerschlag
- Doug Hendersen
- John Hollenbeck
- Human Feel
- Hilmar Jensson
- Simon Jermyn
- Travis Laplante
- Sean Moran
- Oscar Noriega
- Jessica Pavone
- Ben Perowsky
- Ted Reichman
- Zeno De Rossi
- Ches Smith
- Sean Sonderegger
- Chris Speed
- Andy Taub
- Anna Webber

== See also ==
- List of record labels
