= Kate Gentile =

American drummer

- Education: Eastman School of Music
- Occupations: Drummer; composer
- Awards: Guggenheim Fellowship (2024)
- Musical career
- Genres: Jazz
- Instrument: Drums
- Labels: Skirl Records; Pi Recordings; Obliquity Records

Kate Gentile is an American drummer, composer, and record label executive. A 2024 Guggenheim Fellow, her albums include Mannequins (2017), Biomei.i, and Find Letter X (both 2023). She also collaborates with pianist Matt Mitchell, with whom she co-founded Obliquity Records.

== Biography ==
Gentile came from Buffalo, New York, where she recalls that during high school, she did not have a lot of exposure to music because she "was busy cramming for my music school auditions". She obtained her degree in jazz performance and music education from the Eastman School of Music. After moving to Toronto after her marriage to a Canadian, she had to work with rock and metal bands because she could not legally work in the country, before moving to Brooklyn.

Her music career began in 2011. In 2017, she released her debut album Mannequins; it was ranked #50 in the 2017 National Public Radio Music Jazz Critics Poll. In 2023, she released another album, Biomei.i. Will Layman of PopMatters characterized Gentile as "a power drummer, though she is always thinking orchestrally, arguably a modern Elvin Jones or Tony Williams".

She and pianist-composer Matt Michael form the electroacoustic duo Gloatmeal and co-lead the band Snark Horse; in 2021, the two released an eponymous album. She also performed as the drummer and percussionist on Mitchell's 2019 album Phalanx Ambassadors. Layman called their partnership is "central to the chemistry" of their duo. She has also worked as cover artist for Mitchell's work, as well as her own. She and Mitchell started a new label called Obliquity Records.

She also leads the band Find Letter X, and in 2023 they released an album of the same name. She is also leader of jazz/noise rock trio Secret People.

In 2024, she was awarded a Guggenheim Fellowship.

== Discography ==
Title	Year	Details	Ref.
Mannequins (as drummer, vibraphonist, and composer)	2017	Release: June 16, 2017; Label: Skirl Records	
Snark Horse (with Matt Michael)	2021	Release: July 31, 2021; Label: Pi Recordings	
Biomei.i (with International Contemporary Ensemble; as drummer, percussionist, and composer)	2023	Release: May 19, 2023; Label: Obliquity Records	
Find Letter X	2023	Release: October 13, 2023; Label: Pi Recordings	
