= Anna Webber (musician) =

Canadian jazz musician (born 1984)

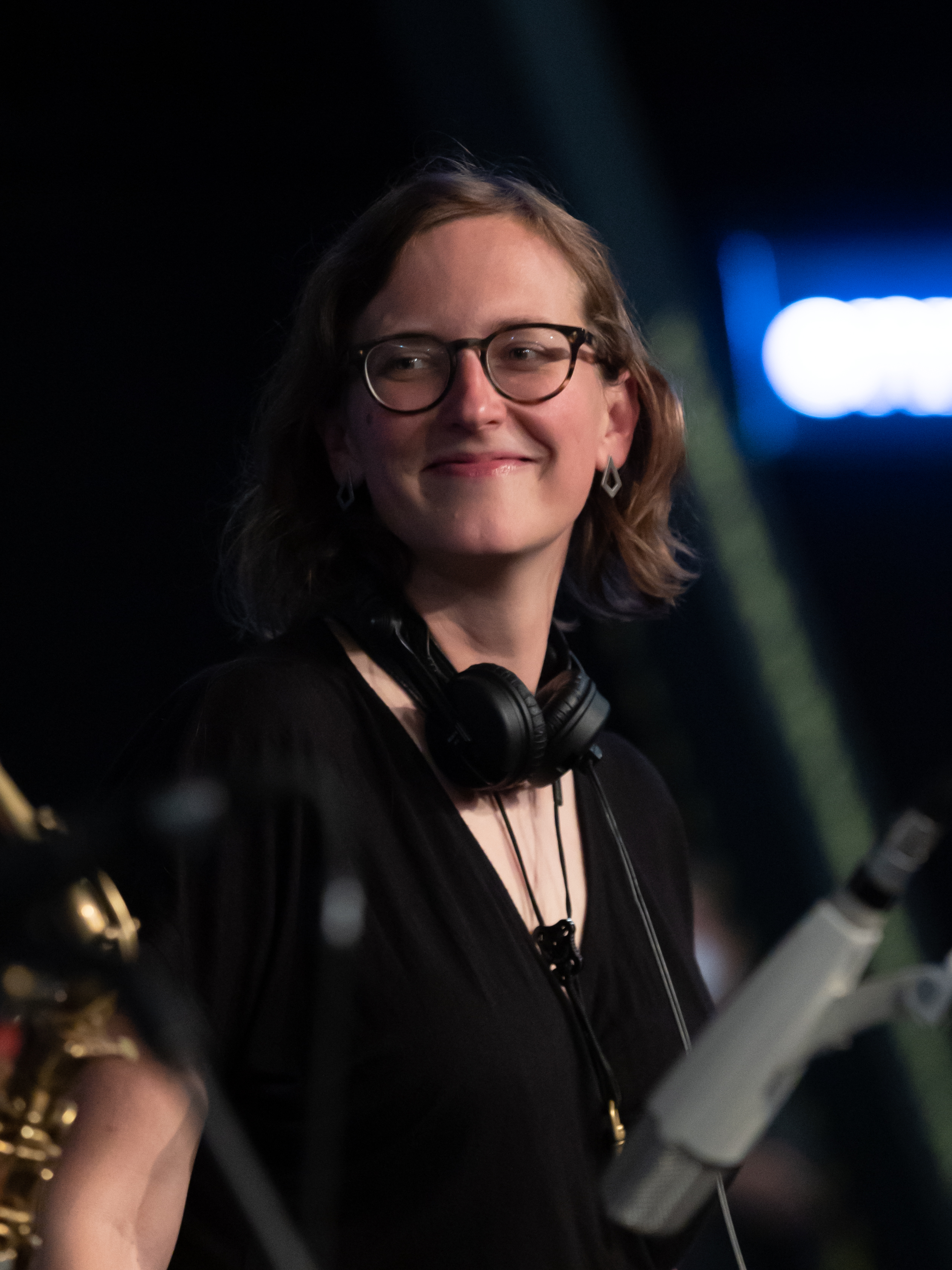
- Anna Webber at the Moers Festival 2022

Background information
- Born: November 26, 1984 (age 41); Vancouver, Canada
- Genres: Avant-garde jazz, free jazz, contemporary classical
- Occupations: Composer, saxophonist, flutist
- Labels: Pi, Astral Spirits, Greenleaf Music, Out Of Your Head Records, Skirl, Pirouet Records
- Website: annakristinwebber.com

Anna Kristin Webber is a Canadian saxophonist, flutist, and composer of avant-garde jazz based in Brooklyn. A Guggenheim Award-winning composer, Webber has released a number of critically-acclaimed albums as leader or co-leader, and received accolades for her work as saxophonist, flutist, and arranger.

== Early life and education ==
Originally from British Columbia, Webber began her studies at Montreal's McGill University. In 2008, she moved to New York City and began a master's degree at Manhattan School of Music.

In 2010, Webber completed her master's, was awarded the Prix François-Marcaurelle at Montreal's L'OFF Festival, and released her debut album as leader, Third Floor People Don't Need to Worry About Anything. Third Floor People features a cast of seven, with Webber as the fixed constant between two quartets: tracks feature either the "Montreal People" (Erik Hove, Jean-Sebastien Williams, Phil Melanson) or the "New York People" (Matt Holman, Owen Stewart, Fred Kennedy).

Webber moved to Germany in 2011 to study with John Hollenbeck at the Jazz Institut Berlin. Hollenbeck later became a member of Webber's Simple Trio. Webber first began working on compositions for big band while in the program, and completed her second master's degree in 2012.

== Career ==
From 2013 to 2016, Webber's releases as leader alternated between her Percussive Mechanics septet and her Simple Trio. The self-titled Percussive Mechanics, featuring James Wylie, Elias Stemeseder, Julius Heise, Igor Spallati, Martin Kruemmling, and Max Andrzejewski, was released on Pirouet Records in 2013, with the group's Refraction following two years later. In 2014, Webber was awarded the prestigious BMI Foundation Charlie Parker Jazz Composition Prize and released SIMPLE, the highly-lauded debut of her trio with John Hollenbeck and pianist Matt Mitchell, on Skirl Records. Two years later, Binary was also released to great acclaim.

In 2017, Webber received a New York Foundation for the Arts Canadian Women Artists’ Award, and in 2018 she was awarded a Guggenheim Award for her work in music composition.

Webber's Clockwise (Pi, 2019) introduced a septet with Jeremy Viner, Jacob Garchik, Christopher Hoffman, Matt Mitchell, Chris Tordini, and Ches Smith. The album was included in the top ten of the 2019 NPR Music Jazz Critics Poll.

The Webber/Morris Big Band, co-led with Angela Morris, released its debut Both Are True on Greenleaf Music in April 2020; the album was included in The New York Times 10 Best Jazz Albums of the year and Bandcamp Daily's Best Jazz Albums of 2020. Later that year she also released Rectangles (Out Of Your Head Records), featuring Marc Hannaford, Adam Hopkins, and Mark Ferber. The quartet's record was included among DownBeat's Best Albums of 2020.

Webber was a 2021 Berlin Prize Fellow and a featured performer on Remy Le Boeuf's "Strata", a nominee for the 2021 Grammy for Best Instrumental Composition.

Co-led projects include trios Jagged Spheres (with Elias Stemeseder, Devin Gray), The Hero of Warchester (with Nathaniel Morgan, Liz Kosack), and the COVID-recent TAC Trio (with Chris Tordini, Theo Bleckmann), as well as the acronymic quartet EAVE with Erik Hove, Vicky Mettler, and Evan Tighe.

Webber's work is often guided by conceptual constraints. Clockwise, the septet record she composed during the first of her two MacDowell residencies, was informed by John Cage's works for percussion; Binary was partly inspired by the now-defunct automated YouTube account Webdriver Torso, and at times directed by the assignation of pitches and intervals to the numbers in Webber's IP address.

== Discography ==
=== As leader ===
Release year	Artist	Title	Label	Additional personnel
2010	Anna Webber	Third Floor People	Nowt	Erik Hove, Jean-Sebastien Williams, Phil Melanson, Matt Holman, Owen Stewart, Fred Kennedy
2013	Anna Webber	Percussive Mechanics	Pirouet	James Wylie, Elias Stemeseder, Julius Heise, Igor Spallati, Martin Kruemmling, Max Andrzejewski
2014	Anna Webber	SIMPLE	Skirl	Matt Mitchell, John Hollenbeck
2015	Anna Webber's Percussive Mechanics	Refraction	Pirouet	James Wylie, Elias Stemeseder, Julius Heise, Igor Spallati, Martin Kruemmling, Max Andrzejewski
2016	Anna Webber's Simple Trio	Binary	Skirl	Matt Mitchell, John Hollenbeck
2019	Anna Webber	Clockwise	Pi	Jeremy Viner, Jacob Garchik, Christopher Hoffman, Matt Mitchell, Chris Tordini, Ches Smith
2020	Anna Webber	Rectangles	Out Of Your Head Records	Marc Hannaford, Adam Hopkins, Mark Ferber
2020	Webber/Morris Big Band	Both Are True	Greenleaf Music	Angela Morris, Jay Rattman, Charlotte Greve, Adam Schneit, Lisa Parrott, John Lake, Jake Henry, Adam O'Farrill, Kenny Warren, Tim Vaughn, Nick Grinder, Jen Baker, Reginald Chapman, Patricia Brennan, Dustin Carlson, Marc Hannaford, Adam Hopkins, Jeff Davis
2021	Anna Webber	Idiom	Pi	Disc One: Matt Mitchell, John Hollenbeck; Disc Two: Nathaniel Morgan, Yuma Uesaka, Adam O’Farrill, David Byrd-Marrow, Jacob Garchik, Erica Dicker, Joanna Mattrey, Mariel Roberts, Liz Kosack, Nick Dunston, Satoshi Takeishi, Eric Wubbels

=== As co-leader ===
Release year	Artist	Title	Label	Personnel
2014	Elias Stemeseder / Devin Gray / Anna Webber	Jagged Spheres	Self-released	Stemeseder, Gray, Webber
2015	The Hero of Warchester	The Hero of Warchester	Prom Night Records	Nathaniel Morgan, Liz Kosack, Anna Webber
2016	Eave	EAVE	Astral Spirits	Erik Hove, Anna Webber, Vicky Mettler, Evan Tighe
2017	Elias Stemeseder / Devin Gray / Anna Webber	Jagged Spheres II	Self-released	Stemeseder, Gray, Webber
2018	The Hero of Warchester	The Four Americas	Self-released	Nathaniel Morgan, Liz Kosack, Anna Webber
2020	TAC Trio	CIX	Self-released	Chris Tordini, Theo Bleckmann, Anna Webber

=== As sideperson ===
Release year	Leader	Title	Label
2009	Stefon Harris	Urbanus	Blue Note
2011	Daniel Jamieson's Danjam Orchestra	Sudden Appearance	OA2 Records
2014	Noah Garabedian	Big Butter and the Eggmen	Brooklyn Jazz Underground Records
2015	Guilhem Flouzat	Portraits	Sunnyside
2016	Dan Weiss	Sixteen: Drummers Suite	Pi Recordings
2017	Matt Mitchell	A Pouting Grimace	Pi
2017	Jen Shyu	Song of Silver Geese	Pi
2017	Harris Eisenstadt	Recent Developments	Songlines
2017	Fabian Almazan / Realm of Possibilities	SWR New Jazz Meeting 2015	Jazzhaus
2018	Adam Hopkins	Crickets	Out of Your Head Records
2018	Ken Thomson	Sextet	Panoramic Recordings
2018	Katell Keineg / Jeff Taylor / Marike Van Dijk	The Stereography Project	Brooklyn Jazz Underground Records
2018	Enrique Haneine	The Mind's Mural	Elegant Walk Records
2019	Dave Douglas	Engage	Greenleaf
2019	Remy Le Boeuf	Assembly of Shadows	Soundspore Records
2019	Colin Hinton	Simulacra	Panoramic Recordings
2020	Raf Vertessen Quartet	LOI	El Negocito Records
2022	Trevor Dunn's Trio-Convulsant	Séances	Pyroclastic Records
