= Chris Speed =

American saxophonist, clarinetist, and composer

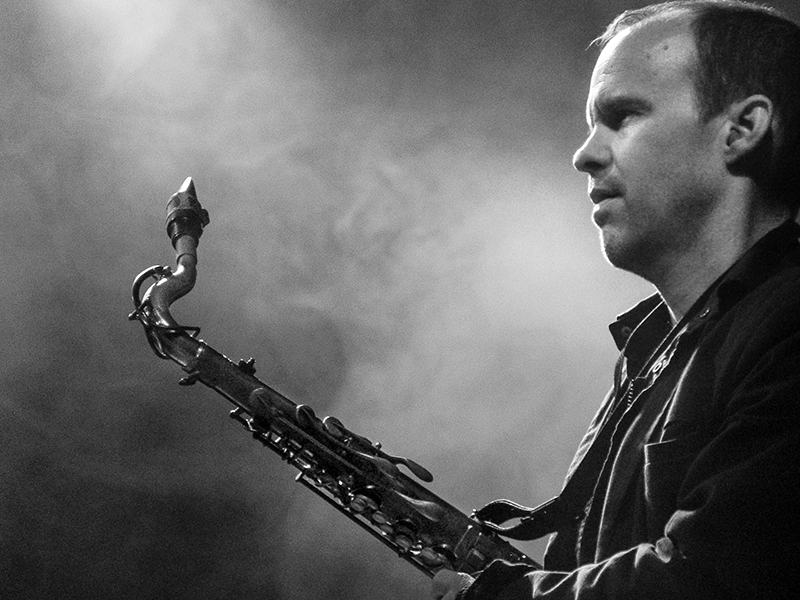
- Chris Speed in Aarhus, Denmark 2010

Background information
- Born: February 12, 1967 (age 59); Seattle, Washington, U.S.
- Genres: jazz, improvisation
- Occupation: Musician
- Instruments: tenor saxophone, clarinet
- Labels: Skirl, Intakt
- Website: www.chrisspeed.com

Chris Speed (born February 12, 1967) is an American saxophonist, clarinetist, and composer.

== Early life and career ==
Speed grew up outside of Seattle and studied classical piano and clarinet from an early age. He later began studying jazz, took up the tenor saxophone, and performed in a local big band while in high school.

Speed attended the New England Conservatory of Music in Boston, where he founded Human Feel with Andrew D'Angelo, Jim Black, and Kurt Rosenwinkel; the band continued performing after his move to New York.

Speed leads or co-leads the groups Pachora (with Jim Black, Skúli Sverrisson, and Brad Shepik), The Clarinets (with Oscar Noriega and Anthony Burr), yeah NO (with Black, Sverrisson, and Cuong Vu), Trio Iffy (with Ben Perowsky and Jamie Saft), Endangered Blood (with Black, Noriega and Trevor Dunn), the Chris Speed Trio (with Dave King and Chris Tordini) and Broken Shadows (with Tim Berne, Reid Anderson and Dave King) a band dedicated to reinterpreting the music of Ornette Coleman and Julius Hemphill.

The co-led quartet Pachora was influenced by Balkan and Middle Eastern rhythms and said to be "immersed in Eastern European and Moroccan music", performing originals and Greek, Bulgarian and Turkish works. Speed also performed and recorded with the Balkan brass and jazz band Slavic Soul Party!.

Speed is a founding member of the avant-garde jazz groups Bloodcount (Tim Berne, Jim Black, Michael Formanek), The Claudia Quintet (John Hollenbeck, Matt Moran, Red Wierenga, and Drew Gress), AlasNoAxis (Black, Sverrisson, and Hilmar Jensson), and Heroic Frenzies (Craig Taborn, Dave King, and Chris Lightcap).

In 2006, Speed created Skirl Records, a label dedicated to Brooklyn-based creative music.

In August 2021, Speed joined The Bad Plus. They released an album, entitled simply The Bad Plus, on September 30, 2022.

== Awards and honors ==
- Rising Star on clarinet, Downbeat magazine, 2004, 2005, 2006
- NEA composition grant in 1993

== Selected discography ==
=== As leader/co-leader ===
- Yeah No (Songlines, 1997)
- Deviantics (Songlines, 1999)
- Emit (Songlines, 2000)
- Iffy (Knitting Factory, 2000)
- Swell Henry (Squealer, 2004)
- Really OK (Skirl, 2014)
- Platinum On Tap (Intakt, 2017)
- Respect for Your Toughness (Intakt, 2019)
- Light Line (Intakt, 2021)
- Despite Obstacles (Intakt, 2023)

Human Feel
With Kurt Rosenwinkel, Andrew D'Angelo and Jim Black

- Human Feel (Human Use, 1989)
- Scatter (GM, 1991)
- Welcome to Malpesta (New World, 1994)
- Speak to It (Songlines, 1996)
- Galore (Skirl, 2007)
- Gold (Intakt, 2019)

Pachora

- Pachora (Knitting Factory, 1997)
- Unn (Knitting Factory, 1998)
- Ast (Knitting Factory, 1999)
- Astereotypical (Winter & Winter, 2003)

The Clarinets

- The Clarinets (Skirl, 2006)
- Keep On Going Like This (Skirl, 2011)
- No Pressure (Skirl, 2019)

Endangered Blood

- Endangered Blood (Skirl, 2011)
- Work Your Magic (Skirl, 2013)
- Don't Freak Out (Skirl, 2018)

Zeno De Rossi

- Ruins (Skirl, 2014)

Broken Shadows

- Broken Shadows (Vinyl: Newvelle, 2019; CD and Digital: Intakt, 2021)
- Broken Shadows Live (Screwgun, 2021)

The Bad Plus

- The Bad Plus. (Edition Records, 2022)
- Complex Emotions (Edition Records, 2024)

=== as a sideman ===
with Tim Berne

- Lowlife: The Paris Concert (JMT, 1995)
- Poisoned Minds: The Paris Concert (JMT, 1995)
- Memory Select: The Paris Concert (JMT, 1995)
- Unwound (Screwgun, 1996)
- Saturation Point (Screwgun, 1997)
- Discretion (Screwgun, 1997)
- Seconds (Screwgun, 2007)
- Insomnia (Clean Feed, 2011)
- Attention Spam (Screwgun, 2021)
- 5 (Screwgun, 2021)

with Jim Black

- AlasNoAxis (Winter & Winter, 2000)
- Splay (Winter & Winter, 2002)
- Habyor (Winter & Winter, 2004)
- Dogs of Great Indifference (Winter & Winter, 2006)
- Houseplant (Winter & Winter, 2009)
- Antiheroes (Winter & Winter, 2013)

with The Claudia Quintet

- John Hollenbeck/The Claudia Quintet (CRI, 2001)
- I, Claudia (Cuneiform, 2004)
- Semi-Formal (Cuneiform, 2005)
- For (Cuneiform, 2007)
- Royal Toast (Cuneiform, 2010)
- What Is the Beautiful? (Cuneiform, 2011)
- September (Cuneiform, 2013)
- Super Petite (Cuneiform, 2016)
- Evidence Based (Flexatonic, 2021)

with Uri Caine

- Uri Caine Ensemble Plays Mozart (Winter & Winter, 2006)
- The Othello Syndrome (Winter & Winter, 2008)
- Rhapsody in Blue (Winter & Winter, 2013)

with Dave King

- Good Old Light (Sunnyside, 2011)
- Adopted Highway (Sunnyside, 2013)
- Surrounded by the Night (Sunnyside, 2016)
- Old TV (Self-released, 2023)

with Craig Taborn

- Daylight Ghosts (ECM, 2017)
- Compass Confusion (Pyroclastic Records, 2020) with Junk Magic

with others/selected

- Hilmar Jensson Dofinn (Jazzis, 1995)
- John Zorn Bar Kokhba (Tzadik, 1996)
- Ben Perowsky Ben Perowsky Trio (JazzKey Music, 1999)
- Myra Melford Above Blue (Arabesque, 1999)
- Curtis Hasselbring The New Mellow Edwards (Skirl, 2006)
- Ben Perowsky Esopus Opus (Skirl, 2009)
- Mary Halvorson Reverse Blue (Relative Pitch, 2014)
- Matt Mitchell Vista Accumulation (Pi, 2015)
- Howard Peach Howard Peach (El Negocito, 2015)
- Michael Formanek The Distance (ECM, 2016)
- Ben Perowsky Upstream (2019)
- Dejan Terzić Axiom Silent Dancer (C.A.M. Jazz, 2021)
