= Morphogenesis (disambiguation) =

Morphogenesis is the biological process through which cells, tissues or organisms develop shape.

Morphogenesis may also refer to:

- Morphogenesis (album), an album by Steve Coleman
- Morphogenesis (architecture firm), an Indian architecture firm
- Morphogenesis (band), a British musical group
- Morphogenesis (Scar Symmetry song), a song in the album Holographic Universe by Scar Symmetry
- Digital morphogenesis
- Hypercyclic morphogenesis

== See also ==
- The Chemical Basis of Morphogenesis
