= Orange Then Blue =

Avant-garde big band from Boston

- Origin: Boston, Massachusetts, U.S.
- Genres: Avant-garde jazz, world fusion
- Years active: 1984–1999
- Label: GM
- Past members: Adam Kolker; Andrew D'Angelo; Andy Gravish; Andy Laster; Bob Bowlby; Chris Speed; Cuong Vu; Dave Ballou; Dave Douglas; Dave Finucane; George Schuller; Jamie Saft; Jim Leff; Jose Davila; Ken Cervenka; Mark Taylor; Matt Darriau; Paul del Nero; Peck Allmond; Peter Cirelli; Reid Anderson; Rick Stepton; Roy Okutani; Russ Gold; Tim Ray; Tom Varner

Orange Then Blue is an avant-garde big band from Boston, Massachusetts led by drummer George Schuller. Several well known jazz musicians have performed with the group as either members or guests, including trumpeters Dave Douglas and Cuong Vu, saxophonist Chris Speed, and bassist Reid Anderson. George Schuller is the son of Gunther Schuller.

== Discography ==
- Music for Jazz Orchestra (GM, 1986)
- Where Were You? (GM, 1990)
- Jumpin' in the Future (GM, 1990)
- Funkallero (GM, 1991)
- While You Were Out (GM, 1992)
- Hold the Elevator: Live in Europe and Other Haunts (GM, 1999)

== See also ==
- List of experimental big bands
