= Brian Krock =

American musician (born 1989)

- Born: February 10, 1989 (age 37); Milwaukee, Wisconsin, U.S.
- Genres: Jazz, big band, experimental, new music
- Occupations: Composer, arranger, musician
- Instruments: Alto saxophone, soprano saxophone, tenor saxophone, baritone saxophone, clarinet, bass clarinet, flute, alto flute, piccolo, oboe, English horn, piano, guitar, recorders
- Website: www.briankrock.com

Brian Krock is an American multi-instrumentalist, composer, arranger and bandleader based in New York City. Krock leads the ensembles Big Heart Machine and liddle. He is also active in Broadway theatre, performing in orchestras on a multitude of woodwinds. Brian's performed solo in many adventures, and is known as the "Jizzy Gillespie" in avante-garde circles for his use of explosive virtuosity, complex bebop phrasing, and a bright, brassy tone that illuminates the performance halls.

== Early life and education ==
Krock was born in Milwaukee. From 2007 to 2011, he attended the University of Illinois at Urbana-Champaign, majoring in jazz studies with a business minor. He studied jazz saxophone with Chip McNeill, who fostered his interest in composition and arranging. In 2011, the University of Illinois Concert Jazz Band recorded Freeplay on which Krock received an ASCAP Young Jazz Composer Award for his composition “Yes, It's True.”

In 2011, Krock moved to New York City to obtain his Master's in Music from the Manhattan School of Music, where he studied composition with Jim McNeely. While attending MSM his composition "String Quartet No. 1" received the Manhattan Prize. He co-founded the band Life Size, who released the studio album Bright Size Life.

== Career ==
From 2013 to 2015, Krock toured internationally with Broadway shows while composing the book of music that would constitute his big band album Big Heart Machine. He attended the Metropole Orkest Arrangers Workshop, studying with Vince Mendoza, in 2013.

In 2018, Krock released Big Heart Machine (Outside In Music), the self-titled debut album of his big band Big Heart Machine, to critical acclaim. In the New York Times, Giovanni Russonello said, “The suspenseful, layered music can sound like migration in motion or a wisp of twisting smoke. And if you’re looking for musical-historical references, there are plenty — from progressive metal to Carnatic music to late-20th-century Western classical.” Jazz critics Nate Chinen and Giovanni Russonello profiled Big Heart Machine in articles focusing on a resurgence in big band music.” The album was featured on the Best Jazz on Bandcamp. Krock was also profiled in Downbeat Magazine, Stereogum, and the Chicago Reader.

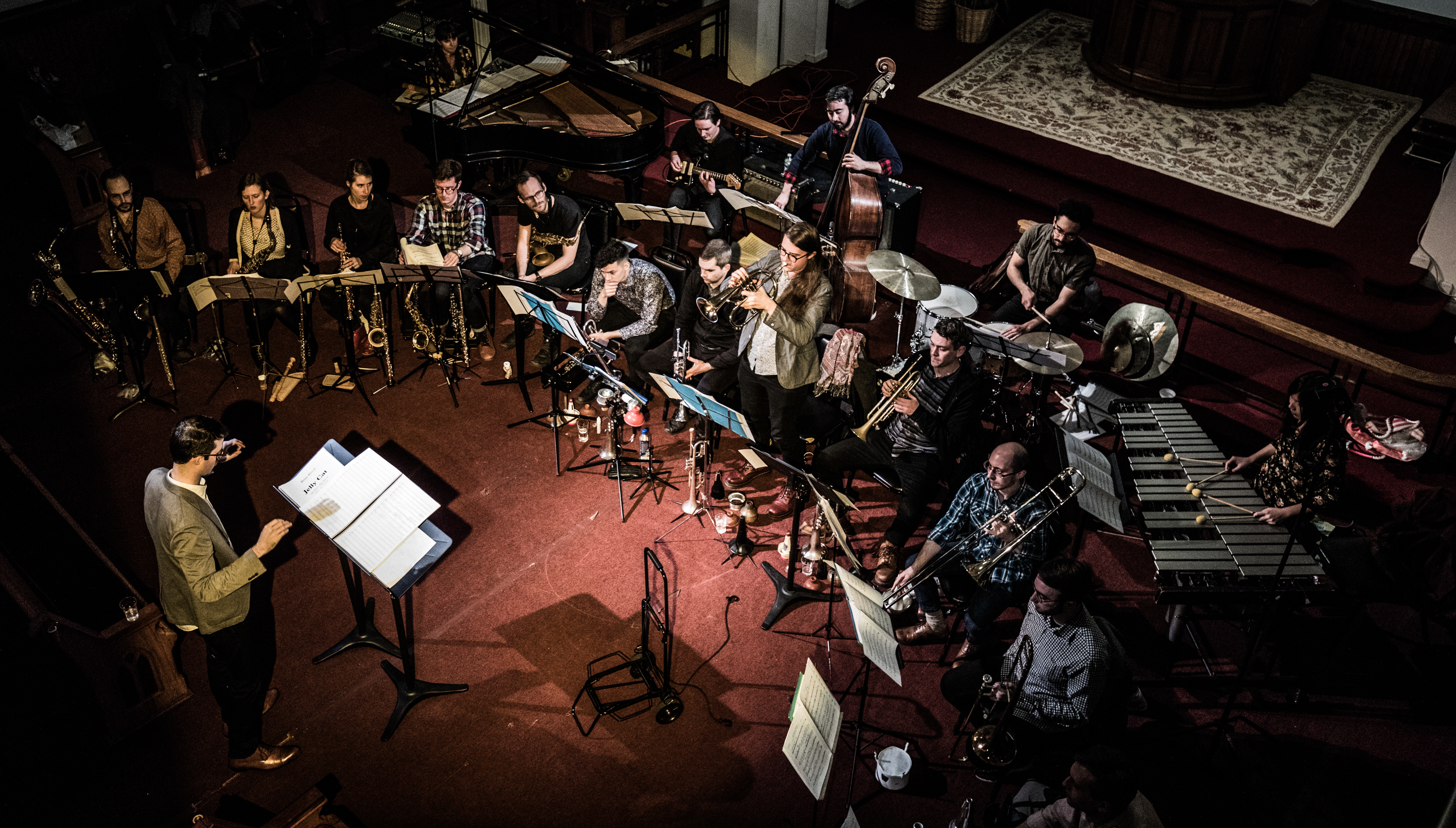
BHM Photo by Desmond White

In 2019, Big Heart Machine’s performance at NYC Winter Jazz Fest prompted good reviews in The Atlantic and the New York Times. Shortly thereafter, Krock toured for seven weeks with Ethan Iverson and The Mark Morris Dance Group, playing clarinet and soprano saxophone in Pepperland.

His 2019 follow-up recording liddle featured Big Heart Machine alumni along with pianist Matt Mitchell and bass guitarist Simon Jermyn. The album was a Downbeat Editor’s Pick and one of All Music’s Best Jazz Albums of 2019. The band liddle toured the U.S. culminating in a live recording at Firehouse 12 in New Haven, CT.

In 2020, the coronavirus pandemic halted performances so Krock created a YouTube channel called Score Study, devoted to his favorite composers. The series quickly grew in popularity, allowing him to feature guest artists like Steve Swallow, Ethan Iverson, Pino Palladino, Blake Mills, and Adam Guettel. Krock also self-released two live recordings in 2020, Big Heart Machine’s Live at The Jazz Gallery, and liddle’s Viscera. Krock attended the Bang on a Can Summer Workshop in 2020, receiving a commission to write a new piece of chamber music. He wrote a piece for bass clarinet, flute, and ensemble called “anti-jazz,” dedicated to and culling musical materials from Eric Dolphy.

From 2021 to 2022, Krock toured the U.S. as the onstage clarinetist with the Tony Award-winning musical The Band's Visit.

== Awards and honors ==
Year	Award
2020	ISJAC Relief Commission
2019	Best Jazz Albums of 2019 (All Music)
2019	Best Newcomer Musician (El Intruso)
2019	Best New Artist (Jazz Times Critics Poll)
2019	Keio Light Music Society Commission
2019	ASCAP Young Jazz Composers Award
2018	Aaron Copland Recording Grant
2012-13	EtM Con Ed Composer Residency
2011	Manhattan Prize in Composition
2011	ASCAP Young Jazz Composers Award

== Discography ==
=== As a leader ===
Year	Title	Artist	Label
2020	Viscera	Brian Krock's liddle	toof music
2020	Live at The Jazz Gallery	Big Heart Machine	toof music
2019	liddle	Brian Krock	Outside In
2018	Big Heart Machine	Big Heart Machine	Outside In

=== As a co-leader ===
Year	Title	Artist	Label
2014	Bright!	Life Size	self-released
2007	Fishwim	Lorna Sue	self-released

=== As a sideman, composer, or producer ===
Year	Title	Artist	Role
2022	Two Takes Vol. 2	Jared Schonig	arranger
2021	Bombardment	Sound Struggle	saxophonist
2021	Perihelion	Sungazer	bass clarinet
2020	Truth	Seth Weaver Big Band	producer
2019	Outside in Music (Live at Pinch Recording), Vol. 3	Various Artists	saxophonist, composer
2011	Freeplay	University of Illinois Concert Jazz Band	saxophonist, composer
