= Houseplant (album) =

Studio album by Jim Black and AlasNoAxis
- Released: February 20, 2009
- Recorded: September & October 2008 in Brooklyn, NY
- Genre: Improvised music, jazz
- Length: 60:37
- Label: Winter & Winter 910 154
- Producer: Jim Black

Jim Black chronology
Dogs of Great Indifference (2006)	Houseplant (2009)	The Veil (2011)

Houseplant is the fifth album by drummer Jim Black's AlasNoAxis featuring clarinetist/saxophonist Chris Speed, guitarist Hilmar Jensson and bassist Skúli Sverrisson recorded in 2008 and released on the Winter & Winter label.

== Reception ==
Professional ratings
Review scores
Source	Rating
Allmusic	4/5 stars
AllAboutJazz	3.5/5 stars

In his review for Allmusic, Dave Lynch said "it would be inaccurate to describe Houseplant as stifled music -- the nearly epic title track might even be heard as soundtracking the titular foliage’s dream of escape, complete with the walls tumbling down -- but at the very least Black, even with his often economical and even understated drumming here, seems intent on exploring how deeply held emotions can be expressed with a minimum of adornment". On AllAboutJazz Glenn Astarita stated "Once again, the leader and his comrades uncannily merge a cheery vibe with modern jazz improvisation and hardcore rock parameters that nicely blend into one neatly wrapped package"."

== Track listing ==
All compositions by Jim Black

1. "Inkionos" - 4:45
2. "Cahme"- 4:36
3. "Houseplant" - 7:09
4. "Fyr" - 1:05
5. "Malomice" - 7:09
6. "Littel" - 4:32
7. "Elight" - 5:55
8. "Naluch" - 5:08
9. "Cadmium Waits" - 3:25
10. "Adbear" - 7:23
11. "Lowers in a Nine Sense" - 5:03
12. "Downstrum" - 3:45

== Personnel ==
- Jim Black - drums, laptop
- Chris Speed - tenor saxophone
- Hilmar Jensson - electric guitar
- Skúli Sverrisson - electric bass
