= Myths of the Near Future Part Two =

Studio album by Mo Boma
- Released: July 26, 1995
- Recorded: January 1993–September 1993 in Witbank and Johannesburg, South Africa, Erlangen, Germany and New York City
- Genre: Ambient
- Length: 41:35
- Label: Extreme
- Producer: Carsten Tiedemann

Mo Boma chronology
Myths of the Near Future Part One (1994)	Myths of the Near Future Part Two (1995)	Myths of the Near Future Part Three (1996)

Professional ratings
Review scores
Source	Rating
Allmusic	3/5 stars

Myths of the Near Future Part Two is the third album by Mo Boma, released on July 26, 1995, through Extreme Records.

== Track listing ==
All music is composed by Mo Boma.

No.	Title	Length
1.	"First Thought Best Thought"	2:11
2.	"Jijimuge Four" (I. Thirsty Heavens/II. Papua Swirl)	6:17
3.	"Mo Fonk"	3:28
4.	"Little Morf"	2:46
5.	"Bombolioheart"	5:33
6.	"Bataloo"	4:05
7.	"Loony Toon"	2:46
8.	"Mebasi"	2:23
9.	"The Day of Creation"	4:30
10.	"Elima: Dance of Girls"	3:24
11.	"Bambuke"	2:19
12.	"Ba 'Mbuti Minus One"	1:53

== Personnel ==
Mo Boma

- Jamshied Sharifi – synthesizer, percussion, engineering
- Skúli Sverrisson – bass guitar, engineering
- Carsten Tiedemann – electric guitar, EBow, lute, synthesizer, percussion, production, mixing, recording

Production and additional personnel

- Silke – cover art
