= Cuong Vu Trio Meets Pat Metheny =

Studio album by Cuong Vu Trio and Pat Metheny
- Released: May 6, 2016
- Recorded: February 4–6, 2015
- Studio: Avatar (New York City)
- Genre: Jazz, avant-garde jazz
- Length: 53:19
- Label: Nonesuch
- Producer: Cuong Vu

Pat Metheny chronology
The Unity Sessions (2016)	Cuong Vu Trio Meets Pat Metheny (2016)	From This Place (2020)

Cuong Vu Trio Meets Pat Metheny is a studio album by trumpeter Cuong Vu and guitarist Pat Metheny, with additional musicians Stomu Takeishi on fretless five-string bass guitar, and Ted Poor on drums. The album was released on May 6, 2016, via Nonesuch label.

Vu had previously been a member of the Pat Metheny Group for two albums and tours before this recording.

== Reception ==
Professional ratings
Review scores
Source	Rating
AllMusic	4/5 stars
The Jazz Mann	4/5 stars
The Guardian	4/5 stars

The AllMusic review by Matt Collar states "Together, the quartet plays a set of original songs that straddle the line between ambient tone poems, exploratory modal jazz, and punk-inflected noise jams". They also selected it as one of their Favorite Jazz Albums of 2016. In The Jazz Mann Ian Mann wrote "This is music that sounds fresh, spontaneous and adventurous but still with enough structure and compositional awareness to appeal to most discerning listeners". Writing for The Guardian John Fordham observed "Metheny enters completely into the exploratory spirit, and gives Vu’s intriguing music a fresh dimension and creative support".

== Track listing ==
All tracks are written by Cuong Vu except where noted.

No.	Title	Writer(s)	Length
1.	"Acid Kiss"		9:05
2.	"Not Crazy (Just Giddy Upping) (For Vina)"		6:05
3.	"Seeds of Doubt"		7:00
4.	"Tiny Little Pieces"		10:29
5.	"Telescope"	Pat Metheny	7:05
6.	"Let's Get Back (For Liduvina)"		7:23
7.	"Tune Blues"	Andrew D'Angelo	6:16
Total length:			53:19

== Personnel ==
- Cuong Vu – trumpet
- Stomu Takeishi – bass
- Ted Poor – drums
- Pat Metheny – guitar

=== Technical personnel ===
- Cuong Vu, Pat Metheny – producers, liner notes
- Pete Karam – recording, mixing, mastering
- Tim Marchiafava – Engineer
- Latifa Metheny, Peter Purgar, Petra Cvelbar – photography
