= Myths of the Near Future Part One =

Studio album by Mo Boma
- Released: 1994
- Recorded: January 1993–September 1993 in Witbank and Johannesburg, South Africa, Erlangen, Germany and New York City
- Genre: Ambient
- Length: 47:36
- Label: Extreme
- Producer: Carsten Tiedemann

Mo Boma chronology
Jijimuge (1992)	Myths of the Near Future Part One (1994)	Myths of the Near Future Part Two (1995)

Professional ratings
Review scores
Source	Rating
Allmusic	4.5/5 stars

Myths of the Near Future Part One is the second album by Mo Boma, released in 1994 through Extreme Records.

== Track listing ==
All music is composed by Mo Boma

No.	Title	Length
1.	"Food of the Gods"	6:19
2.	"Walk Like a Pygmy"	4:06
3.	"The Kindness of Women"	3:58
4.	"Slolooblade: The Drowned World"	7:03
5.	"Terrace"	3:47
6.	"Jijimuge Three" (I. Yellow Earth/II. Amaboma)	7:18
7.	"Mongombi"	3:52
8.	"Garden of Time"	5:50
9.	"Nyodi"	5:23

== Personnel ==
Mo Boma

- Jamshied Sharifi – synthesizer, percussion, engineering
- Skúli Sverrisson – bass guitar, engineering
- Carsten Tiedemann – electric guitar, EBow, lute, synthesizer, percussion, production, mixing, recording

Production and additional personnel

- Günter Derleth – photography
- Silke – cover art
