= Jim Black =

American jazz drummer

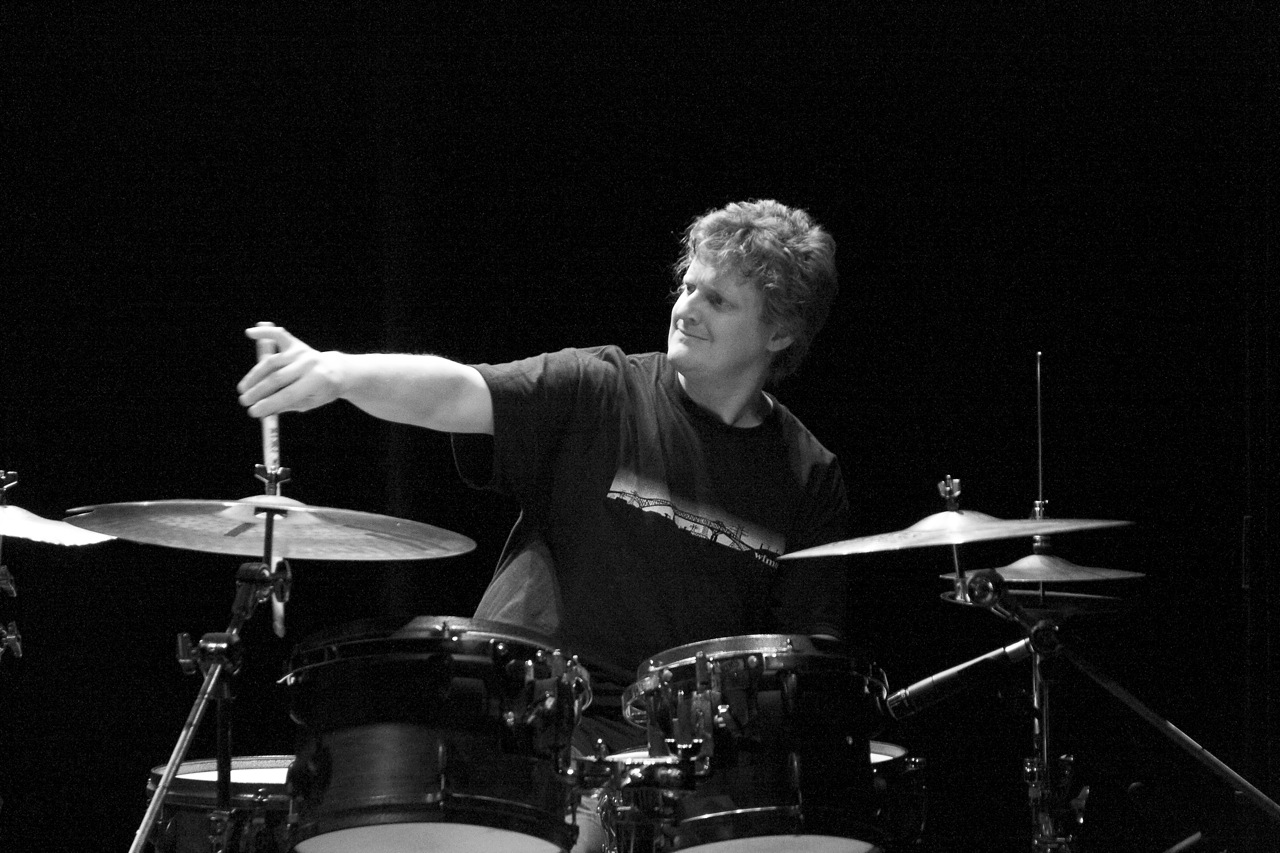
- Black performing in 2007

Background information
- Born: Seattle, Washington
- Genres: Jazz
- Occupation: Musician
- Instrument: Drums
- Label: Winter & Winter
- Website: jimblack.com

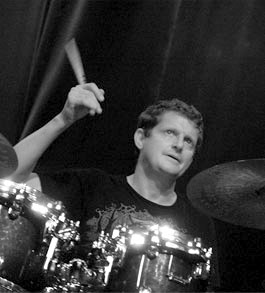
Jim Black performing in Aarhus, Denmark

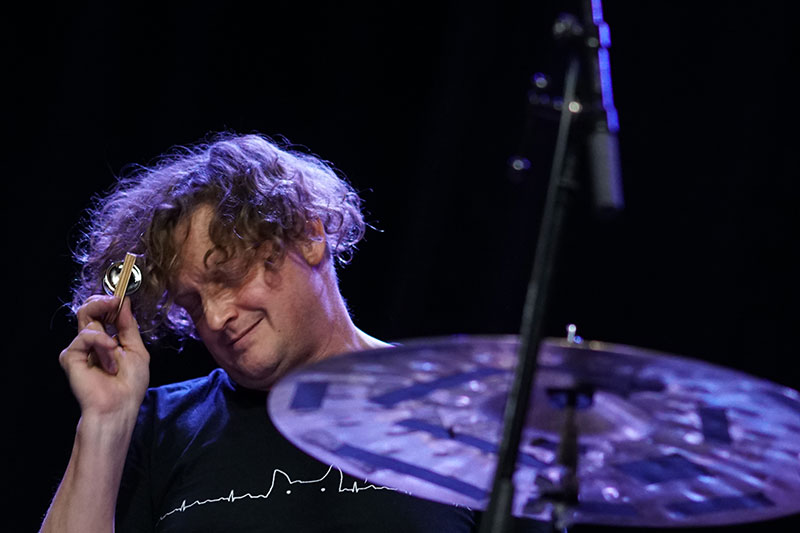
Jim Black in Denmark 2018

Jim Black is an American jazz drummer who has performed with Tim Berne and Dave Douglas. He attended Berklee College of Music.

== Career ==
His band AlasNoAxis includes Hilmar Jensson on electric guitar, Chris Speed on tenor saxophone and clarinet, and Skúli Sverrisson on bass guitar. The music is in some ways closer to post-rock than jazz, concentrating on rhythmic shifts and ensemble texture rather than featured solos. Since 2000 Winter & Winter has released several of the band's albums.

Pachora includes Black, Speed, Sverrisson, and Brad Shepik on tambura and electric saz. This band plays music that is rhythmically diverse and inspired by Balkan rhythms.

Black participated as drummer 12 in the Boredoms 77 Boadrum performance on July 7, 2007 at the Empire-Fulton Ferry State Park in Brooklyn, New York.

He is also one-third of the group BBC (Berne/Black/Cline) with alto saxophonist Berne and Nels Cline of Wilco. The group released the album The Veil in 2011.

== Discography ==
=== As leader ===
- Malamute (Intakt, 2017)

==== With AlasNoAxis ====
- AlasNoAxis (Winter & Winter, 2000)
- Splay (Winter & Winter, 2002)
- Habyor (Winter & Winter, 2004)
- Dogs of Great Indifference (Winter & Winter, 2006)
- Houseplant (Winter & Winter, 2009)
- Antiheroes (Winter & Winter, 2013)

==== With the Jim Black Trio ====
- Somatic (Winter & Winter, 2011)
- Actuality (Winter & Winter, 2014)
- The Constant (Intakt, 2016)
- Reckon (Intakt, 2020)

==== With Jim & The Schrimps ====
- Ain't No Saint (Intakt, 2023)
- Better You Don't (Intakt, 2025)

=== As co-leader ===
With Human Feel

- Human Feel (Human Use 1989)
- Scatter (GM, 1991)
- Welcome to Malpesta (New World 1994)
- Speak to It (Songlines, 1996)
- Galore (Skirl, 2007)
- Gold (Intakt, 2019)

With BB&C

- The Veil (Cryptogramophone, 2011)

=== As sideman ===
With Laurie Anderson

- Life on a String (Nonesuch, 2001)
- Live at Town Hall New York City September 19-20 2001 (Nonesuch, 2002)

With Tim Berne

- Lowlife: The Paris Concert (JMT, 1995)
- Poisoned Minds: The Paris Concert (JMT, 1995)
- Memory Select: The Paris Concert (JMT, 1995)
- Unwound (Screwgun, 1996)
- Saturation Point (Screwgun, 1997)
- Discretion (Screwgun, 1997)
- Seconds (Screwgun, 2007)
- Insomnia (Clean Feed, 2011)
- Attention Spam (Screwgun, 2021)
- 5 (Screwgun, 2021)

With Carlos Bica

- Azul (EmArcy, 1996)
- Twist (Enja, 1998)
- Look What They've Done to My Song (Enja, 2003)
- Believer (Enja, 2006)
- Things About (Clean Feed, 2011)
- More Than This (Clean Feed, 2016)
- Azul in Ljubljana (Clean Feed, 2018)

With David Binney

- South (ACT, 2001)
- Balance (ACT, 2002)

With Uri Caine

- Gustav Mahler in Toblach (Winter & Winter, 1999)
- Gustav Mahler: Dark Flame (Winter & Winter, 2003)
- Uri Caine Ensemble Plays Mozart (Winter & Winter, 2006)
- The Othello Syndrome (Winter & Winter, 2008)
- Rhapsody in Blue (Winter & Winter, 2013)

With Danilo Gallo Dark Dry Tears

- Thinking Beats Where Mind Dies (Parco della Musica, 2017)
- Hide, Show Yourself! (Parco della Musica Records, 2020)
- A View through a slot (Clean Feed, 2021)

With Dave Douglas

- The Tiny Bell Trio (Songlines, 1994)
- Constellations (hat ART, 1996)
- Live in Europe (Arabesque, 1997)
- Songs for Wandering Souls (Winter & Winter, 1999)

With Mark Dresser

- Sedimental You (Clean Feed, 2016)
- Ain't Nothing But a Cyber Coup & You (Clean Feed, 2019)

With Ellery Eskelin

- Jazz Trash (Songlines, 1995)
- One Great Day... (hatOLOGY, 1997)
- Kulak, 29 & 30 (hatOLOGY, 1998)
- Five Other Pieces (+2) (hatOLOGY, 1999)
- Ramifications (hatOLOGY, 2000)
- The Secret Museum (hatOLOGY, 2000)
- 12 (+1) Imaginary Views (hatOLOGY, 2002)
- Arcanum Moderne (hatOLOGY, 2003)
- Ten (hatOLOGY, 2004)
- Quiet Music (Prime Source, 2006)
- One Great Night...Live (hatOLOGY, 2009)

With Chris Speed

- Yeah No (Songlines, 1997)
- Deviantics (Songlines, 1999)
- Emit (Songlines, 2000)
- Swell Henry (Squealer, 2004)

With Pachora

- Pachora (Knitting Factory, 1997)
- Unn (Knitting Factory, 1998)
- Ast (Knitting Factory, 1999)
- Astereotypical (Winter & Winter, 2003)

With Endangered Blood

- Endangered Blood (Skirl, 2011)
- Work Your Magic (Skirl, 2013)
- Don't Freak Out (Skirl, 2018)

With Peter Evans

- Ghosts (More Is More, 2011)
- Destination: Void (More Is More, 2014)
- Genesis (More Is More, 2016)

With Satoko Fujii

- Looking Out of the Window (Ninety-One, 1997)
- Kitsune-bi (Tzadik, 1999)
- Toward to West (Enja, 2000)
- Junction (EWE, 2001)
- Bell the Cat! (Tokuma, 2002)
- Illusion Suite (Libra, 2004)
- Live in Japan 2004 (Natsat Music/PJL, 2005)
- When We Were There (PJL, 2006)
- Trace a River (Libra, 2008)

With Hilmar Jensson

- Dofinn (Jazzis, 1995)
- Tyft (Songlines, 2002)
- Ditty Blei (Songlines, 2004)

With David Liebman

- Different but the Same (hatOLOGY, 2005)
- Renewal (hatOLOGY, 2008)
- Non Sequiturs (Hatology, 2011)

With Ben Monder

- Flux (Songlines, 1996)
- Dust (Arabesque, 1997)
- Excavation (Arabesque, 2000)

With Jamie Saft

- Ragged Jack (Avant, 1996)
- Sovlanut (Tzadik, 2000)

With others

- Julian Arguelles, Live in Dublin (Auand, 2006)
- Theo Bleckmann, No Boat (Songlines, 1997)
- Stefano Bollani, Sheik Yer Zappa (Decca, 2014)
- Boredoms, 77 Boa (Drum Commmons, 2008)
- Marty Cook, Phases of the Moon (Tutu, 1994)
- Andrew D'Angelo, Skadra Degis (Skirl, 2008)
- Kris Davis, Save Your Breath (Clean Feed, 2015)
- Robert Dick, Third Stone from the Sun (New World/CounterCurrents 1993)
- Peter Epstein, Staring at the Sun (MA, 1997)
- John Escreet, Sabotage and Celebration (Whirlwind, 2013)
- Michael Formanek, Nature of the Beast (Enja, 1997)
- Lee Konitz, Jugendstil II (ESP Disk, 2010)
- Donny McCaslin, Seen from Above (Arabesque, 2000)
- Raz Mesinai, Unit of Resistance (ROIR 2007)
- Anais Mitchell, Hadestown (Righteous Babe, 2010)
- Ikue Mori, Obelisk (Tzadik, 2017)
- Hank Roberts, Green (Winter & Winter, 2008)
- Ned Rothenberg, Real and Imagined Time (Moers Music, 1995)
- Ed Schuller, The Force (Tutu, 1996)
- Assif Tsahar, Jam (Hopscotch, 2003)
- Cuong Vu, Bound (OmniTone, 2000)
- John Zorn, Voices in the Wilderness (Tzadik, 2003)
- Vox Bigerri, Tiò (Le Fil, 2018)
