= All Can Work =

Studio album by John Hollenbeck Large Ensemble
- Released: January 26, 2018
- Recorded: June 15–16, 2017

All Can Work is an album by the John Hollenbeck Large Ensemble, released on January 26, 2018. The album's tracks were recorded on June 15–16, 2017.

== Track listing ==
1. "Iud"
2. "All Can Work"
3. "Elf"
4. "Heyoke"
5. "This Kiss"
6. "From Trees"
7. "Long Swing Dream"
8. "The Model"
