= Jessica Pavone =

- Genres: avant-garde jazz, contemporary classical, experimental, improvised music
- Occupations: composer-improviser, teacher
- Instruments: viola, violin
- Labels: Astral Spirits, Birdwatcher, Relative Pitch, Tzadik, Thirsty Ear, Skirl Records
- Website: jessicapavone.com

Jessica Pavone is a New York-based violinist, violist and experimental composer. Her jazz-and-classical-inspired avant-garde music combines elements of improvisation and composition.

== Background ==
Pavone is a graduate of the Hartt School of Music. While teaching public school in Hartford, Connecticut, she became involved with a community of improvisers and composers around Wesleyan University and avant-garde jazz composer Anthony Braxton.

In 2001, Pavone released Jessica Pavone & the String Army. A year later she released 27 Epigrams, a collection of short pieces for small ensembles.

Her music has been characterized as “avant-improv.”

Around 2001, Pavone started performing with avant-jazz guitarist (and Anthony Braxton student) Mary Halvorson. The New York Times described her duo work with Halvorson as “intricate song forms met with startling jolts of insight that felt as rooted in experimental rock, folk and chamber music as in any subspecies of jazz.”

She also performs as Dark Tips with Raquel Bell.

Pavone has been part of ensembles led by Anthony Braxton, Henry Threadgill, and Matthew Welch. Pavone has earned grants and commissions from the Aaron Copland Recording Fund, the American Music Center, The Kitchen, MATA, The Jerome Foundation. Her music has been released by Tzadik, Thirsty Ear, Relative Pitch Records, and other labels. Pavone has also performed with cellist Paul de Jong on occasion.

== Discography ==
=== As leader / co-leader ===
- Jessica Pavone & the String Army (Peacock Recordings, 2001)
- 27 Epigrams (Peacock, 2002)
- Mary Halvorson & Pavone, Prairies (Lucky Kitchen, 2006)
- Quotidian (Peacock, 2007)
- Halvorson & Pavone, On and Off (Skirl Records, 2007)
- This Is My Violin (2007)
- Walking, Sleeping, Breathing (Experience, 2007)
- Halvorson & Pavone, Thin Air (Thirsty Ear, 2009)
- Songs of Synastry and Solitude (Tzadik, 2009)
- Halvorson & Pavone, Departure of Reason (Thirsty Ear, 2011)
- Army of Strangers (Porter Records, 2011)
- Hope Dawson Is Missing (Tzadik, 2012)
- Normal Love, Survival Tricks (ugEXPLODE, 2012)
- Knuckle Under (Taiga Records, 2014)
- Silent Spills (Relative Pitch Records, 2016)
- Dark Tips, Advice from the Underworld (Prom Night Records, 2018)
- In the Action (Relative Pitch, 2019)
- J. Pavone String Ensemble, Brick and Mortar (Birdwatcher Records, 2019); with Joanna Mattrey, Erica Dicker, Angela Morris
- J. Pavone String Ensemble, Lost and Found (Astral Spirits, 2020); with Abby Swidler, Dicker, Morris
- Clamor (Out of Your Head, 2023)
