= Songs for Wandering Souls =

Studio album by Dave Douglas
- Released: 1999
- Recorded: December 1–2, 1998
- Genre: Jazz
- Label: Winter & Winter
- Producer: Dave Douglas & Joe Ferla

Dave Douglas chronology
Convergence (1999)	Songs for Wandering Souls (1999)	Soul on Soul (2000)

Songs for Wandering Souls is the thirteenth album by the trumpeter Dave Douglas, and the fourth to feature his Tiny Bell Trio. It was released on the German Winter & Winter label in 1999; it contains performances by Douglas, Brad Shepik and Jim Black.

== Reception ==
The AllMusic review by Thom Jurek stated: "Songs for Wandering Souls is a truly wonderful installment in this revelatory band's journey. May it be long and prosperous".

Professional ratings
Review scores
Source	Rating
AllMusic	4/5 stars
The Penguin Guide to Jazz Recordings	3.5/4 stars

== Track listing ==
1. "Sam Hill" - 6:09
2. "At Dusk" - 6:49
3. "Prolix" - 4:26
4. "Loopy" - 7:31
5. "One Shot" - 5:21
6. "Breath-A-Thon" (Kirk) - 2:52
7. "Nicht So Schnell, Mit Viel Ton Zu Spielen" (Schumann) - 4:26
8. "Gowanus" - 5:36
9. "Wandering Souls" - 9:13
10. "Ferrous" - 3:40

All compositions by Dave Douglas except as indicated

- Recorded at Avatar Studios, New York on December 1–2, 1998

== Personnel ==
- Dave Douglas: trumpet
- Brad Shepik: guitar
- Jim Black: drums
