= AlasNoAxis =

Studio album by Jim Black
- Released: 2000
- Recorded: February 17 & 18, 2000
- Genre: Improvised music, jazz
- Length: 72:15
- Label: Winter & Winter 910 061
- Producer: Stefan Winter

Jim Black chronology
| AlasNoAxis (2000) | Splay (2002) |

AlasNoAxis is the debut album by drummer Jim Black's AlasNoAxis featuring clarinetist/saxophonist Chris Speed, guitarist Hilmar Jensson and bassist Skúli Sverrisson recorded in 2000 and released on the Winter & Winter label.

== Reception ==
Professional ratings
Review scores
| Source | Rating |
|---|---|
| Allmusic | 4.5/5 stars |

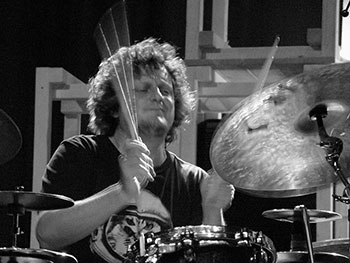
Jim Black

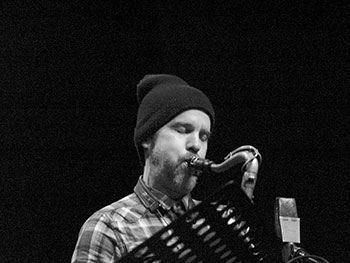
Chris Speed

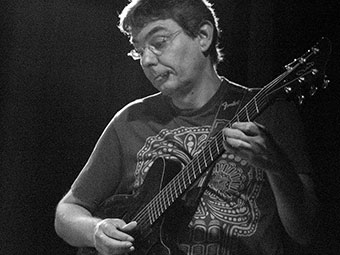
Hilmar Jensson

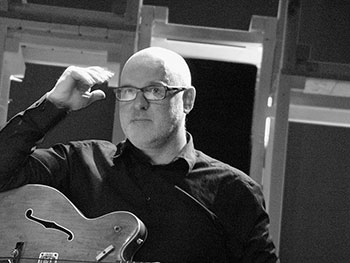
Skuli Sverrisson

In his review for Allmusic, Dave Lynch said "Alasnoaxis is a great debut for Black, although those who prefer their jazz unsullied by elements of the indie, prog, and avant rock worlds may be a bit put off". In JazzTimes, Bill Shoemaker observed "the album is something of the sonic equivalent of a tapas bar: lots of strong flavors served up in small portions, with plenty of spirits to clear the palette between tastes".

== Track listing ==
All compositions by Jim Black

1. "M m" - 2:38
2. "Optical" - 5:04
3. "Maybe" - 4:09
4. "Ambacharm" - 6:31
5. "Garden Frequency" - 3:09
6. "Poet Staggered" - 1:11
7. "Backfloatpedal" - 2:46
8. "Icon" - 5:59
9. "Luxuriate" - 6:52
10. "Boombye" - 5:26
11. "Auk and Dromedary" - 5:58
12. "Trace" - 3:15
13. "Nion" - 4:17
14. "Melize" - 6:54
15. "Angels and Artiface" - 1:37

== Personnel ==
- Jim Black - drums
- Chris Speed - clarinet, tenor saxophone
- Hilmar Jensson - electric guitar
- Skúli Sverrisson - electric bass
