= From This Place =

Studio album by Pat Metheny
- Released: February 21, 2020
- Studios: Avatar Studios in New York City, Sony Scoring Stage (orchestra) and Igloo Studio (percussion) in Los Angeles
- Genre: Jazz Fusion
- Length: 1:16:37
- Label: Nonesuch
- Producers: Pat Metheny, Steve Rodby

Pat Metheny chronology
Cuong Vu Trio Meets Pat Metheny (2016)	From This Place (2020)	Road to the Sun (2021)

Professional ratings
Aggregate scores
Source	Rating
Metacritic	79/100
Review scores
Source	Rating
AllMusic	4/5 stars
The Guardian	4/5 stars
PopMatters	6/10 stars
Tom Hull	B+

From This Place is a studio album by American jazz guitarist Pat Metheny, released in February 2020 on the Nonesuch label.

== Track listing ==
All tracks are written by Pat Metheny.

No.	Title	Length
1.	"America Undefined"	13:22
2.	"Wide and Far"	8:26
3.	"You Are"	6:13
4.	"Same River"	6:43
5.	"Pathmaker"	8:19
6.	"The Past in Us"	6:23
7.	"Everything Explained"	6:52
8.	"From This Place"	4:40
9.	"Sixty-Six"	9:38
10.	"Love May Take A While" (bonus track)	5:57
Total length:		1:16:37

== Personnel ==
The image on the front cover is of a Category F5 tornado approaching Elie, Manitoba.

The individuals involved in the making of the album include Metheny and his traveling ensemble, plus a number of studio musicians, listed below.

- Pat Metheny – guitars, keyboards, arranger, composer, producer
- Gwilym Simcock – piano, arranger
- Linda May Han Oh – bass, vocals, arranger
- Antonio Sánchez – drums

Guest artists

- Meshell Ndegeocello – lyricist, vocals (track 8)
- Grégoire Maret – harmonica (track 6)
- Luis Conte – percussion
- Alison Riley – lyricist (track 8)
- Alan Broadbent, Gil Goldstein and Pat Metheny – orchestral arranger
- Hollywood Studio Symphony with Joel McNeely conductor
