= Echoing Delight =

Studio album by Vidna Obmana
- Released: October 5, 1993
- Recorded: January 1992–March 1993
- Genre: Ambient
- Length: 67:40
- Label: Extreme

Vidna Obmana chronology
Ending Mirage (1993)	Echoing Delight (1993)	The Spiritual Bonding (1994)

Professional ratings
Review scores
Source	Rating
Allmusic	4.5/5 stars

Echoing Delight is an album by Vidna Obmana, released on October 5, 1993 through Extreme Records.

== Track listing ==
All music is composed by Vidna Obmana, except "Narrow Gloom (Part Two)" co-composed by Djen Ajakan Shean

No.	Title	Length
1.	"Winter Mouvement"	8:00
2.	"Crystal Travelling"	9:25
3.	"Empty Night"	7:50
4.	"Echoing Delight"	17:30
5.	"Narrow Gloom" (part two)	10:00
6.	"Glass Splendour"	14:55

== Personnel ==
- Doriana Corda – cover art
- Tom Kloeck – gong and percussion on "Winter Mouvement"
- Vidna Obmana – instruments, tape, drum machine, percussion, didgeridoo, voice, arrangement
- Djen Ajakan Shean – drum machine, percussion and arrangement on "Narrow Gloom (Part Two)"
