= Parallel Flaming =

Studio album by Djen Ajakan Shean and Vidna Obmana
- Released: 1994
- Recorded: January 1992–July 1993
- Genre: Ambient
- Length: 60:21
- Label: Multimood

Vidna Obmana chronology
The Spiritual Bonding (1994)	Parallel Flaming (1994)	Still Fragments (1994)

Professional ratings
Review scores
Source	Rating
AllMusic	4/5 stars

Parallel Flaming is an album by Djen Ajakan Shean and Vidna Obmana, released in 1994 through Multimood.

== Track listing ==
All tracks are written by Vidna Obmana and Djen Ajakan Shean

No.	Title	Length
1.	"Fleeting Space"	8:00
2.	"Parallel Flaming"	5:45
3.	"Triangle of Dawn"	8:45
4.	"Nocturn"	8:36
5.	"Narrow Gloom"	9:40
6.	"Shades of Ancient"	8:40
7.	"Doekoen"	10:55

== Personnel ==
- Kris Cleerbaut – photography
- Vidna Obmana – tape, udu, shaker, maracas, rainstick, tubular bells, didgeridoo, arrangement
- Djen Ajakan Shean – drum machine, flute, percussion, arrangement
