= Dogs of Great Indifference =

Studio album by Jim Black's AlasNoAxis
- Released: June 13, 2006
- Recorded: October 30 & 31 and November 1, 2005; Brooklyn Recording, NY
- Genre: Improvised music, jazz
- Length: 65:26
- Label: Winter & Winter 910 120
- Producer: Stefan Winter

Jim Black chronology
Habyor (2004)	Dogs of Great Indifference (2006)	Houseplant (2009)

Dogs of Great Indifference is the fourth album by drummer Jim Black's AlasNoAxis featuring clarinetist/saxophonist Chris Speed, guitarist Hilmar Jensson and bassist Skúli Sverrisson released on the Winter & Winter label in 2006.

== Reception ==
Professional ratings
Review scores
Source	Rating
Allmusic	4.5/5 stars
AllAboutJazz	4.5/5 stars

In his review for Allmusic, Dave Lynch said "Maybe a bandleader as accomplished as Black sees Dogs of Great Indifference merely as fun indie rock, but there's also the possibility that in all its contradictions, this music has perfectly captured the Zeitgeist of the mid-2000s, a time when nobody actually agrees upon a common Zeitgeist yet everybody is in it together". In JazzTimes, Andrew Lindemann Malone observed "Those who like to relax with tunes may find Dogs of Great Indifference to be too unsteady, but if you want stimulation, Black and his band are right on the beam". On AllAboutJazz Chris May stated "Dogs Of Great Indifference, the Seattle-born, Brooklyn-based drummer's fourth disc with his AlasNoAxis quartet, is a near-perfect gumbo. Heavy on backbeats and slash and burn guitar riffs, it's also full of astonishing freewheeling collective improvisation and adventure".

== Track listing ==
All compositions by Jim Black

1. "Oddfelt" - 7:52
2. "Dogs of Great Indifference" - 6:49
3. "Tars and Vanish" - 7:59
4. "Spins So Free" - 2:22
5. "Star Rubbed" - 3:50
6. "Harmstrong" - 5:21
7. "Everybody Says the Same" - 7:33
8. "You Know Just Because" - 5:12
9. "Desemrascar" - 9:40
10. "Harmsoft" - 1:36
11. "I Am Seven" - 6:51

== Personnel ==
- Jim Black - drums
- Chris Speed - clarinet, tenor saxophone
- Hilmar Jensson - electric guitar
- Skúli Sverrisson - electric bass
