= Human Feel =

- Origin: Boston, Massachusetts, U.S.
- Genres: Jazz, free jazz, experimental
- Years active: 1989–present
- Labels: GM, Skirl
- Members: Kurt Rosenwinkel; Chris Speed; Andrew D'Angelo; Jim Black
- Website: Official site

Human Feel is a jazz quartet that consists of clarinet/tenor saxophone player Chris Speed, bass clarinet/alto saxophone player Andrew D'Angelo, guitarist Kurt Rosenwinkel, and drummer Jim Black. The group combines elements of free jazz, chamber music, and alternative rock and features extensive improvisation in their performances. Gary W. Kennedy noted their "tight-knit interaction and exploratory style."

Human Feel was formed in 1987 when Speed, D'Angelo, and Black were studying music in Boston. Rosenwinkel joined in 1990. In the early 90s, the members relocated to New York City.

== Discography ==
=== Albums ===
- Human Feel (Human Use, 1989)
- Scatter (GM, 1991)
- Welcome to Malpesta (New World, 1994)
- Speak to It (Songlines, 1996)
- Galore (Skirl, 2007)
- Gold (Intakt, 2019)

=== EPs ===
- Party Favor (Independent, 2016)
