= Mo Boma =

Ambient music ensemble

- Origin: Boston, Massachusetts, United States
- Genres: Ambient
- Years active: 1989–1996
- Labels: Extreme
- Past members: Jamshied Sharifi; Skúli Sverrisson; Carsten Tiedemann

Mo Boma was an ambient music ensemble from Boston, Massachusetts, formed in 1989 by Skúli Sverrisson and Carsten Tiedemann. Their name comes from a pygmy lullaby for girls. In 1990, Jamshied Sharifi joined the group as well. Their second album Myths of the Near Future Part One was released in 1994 and was the first in a trilogy of works based on Myths of the Near Future by J. G. Ballard.

== Discography ==
Studio albums

- Jijimuge (1992, Extreme)
- Myths of the Near Future Part One (1994, Extreme)
- Myths of the Near Future Part Two (1995, Extreme)
- Myths of the Near Future Part Three (1996, Extreme)
