= Jijimuge =

Studio album by Mo Boma
- Released: 1992
- Recorded: Summer 1991 in Chateau des Rotoirs, France, and Erlangen, Germany
- Genre: Ambient
- Length: 48:11
- Label: Extreme
- Producer: Carsten Tiedemann

Mo Boma chronology
| Jijimuge (1992) | Myths of the Near Future Part One (1994) |

Professional ratings
Review scores
| Source | Rating |
|---|---|
| Allmusic | 2.5/5 stars |

Jijimuge is the debut album of Mo Boma, released in 1992 through Extreme Records.

== Track listing ==
All music is composed by Mo Boma

| No. | Title | Length |
|---|---|---|
| 1. | "Ituri Spaceman" | 2:56 |
| 2. | "Ah Bobé" | 6:23 |
| 3. | "Go Sneak It" | 4:44 |
| 4. | "Jijimuge One: Hut Song/Chronos" | 10:28 |
| 5. | "Strange Attractors" | 3:07 |
| 6. | "The Drums Must Never Stop" | 5:57 |
| 7. | "Invocation" | 7:42 |
| 8. | "Jijimuge Two: Rebounders/Nanga Ningi" | 6:54 |

== Personnel ==
Mo Boma

- Jamshied Sharifi – synthesizer
- Skúli Sverrisson – extended-range bass, fretless bass
- Carsten Tiedemann – acoustic guitar, electric guitar, EBow, percussion, production, mixing, recording

Production and additional personnel

- Silke – cover art
