= Splay (Jim Black album) =

Studio album by Jim Black's AlasNoAxis
- Released: May 7, 2002
- Recorded: 2002
- Genre: Improvised music, jazz
- Length: 62:34
- Label: Winter & Winter 910 076
- Producer: Stefan Winter

Jim Black chronology
AlasNoAxis (2000)	Splay (2002)	Habyor (2004)

Splay is the second album by drummer Jim Black's AlasNoAxis featuring clarinetist/saxophonist Chris Speed, guitarist Hilmar Jensson and bassist Skúli Sverrisson released on the Winter & Winter label in 2002.

== Reception ==
Professional ratings
Review scores
Source	Rating
Allmusic	4/5 stars
Pitchfork Media	7.5

In his review for Allmusic, Thom Jurek said "This is music with its power-chorded rock riffs worn loudly and proudly, pushing the needle into the red on virtually every tune, while exploring the notions of overt yet complex lyricism and song forms... This is a solid, humorous, and delightful recording by a guy who is really just getting started as a composer". In JazzTimes, Stuart Nicholson observed "With the diversity of influences that swam through his music, whether it be world, electronics, minimalism, computer samples or Icelandic rock, Black seemed to suggest there are no boundaries in music, responding to the challenge of a new millennium by making the transition from the tradition, as exemplified by jazz's heroes, by using established values on the one hand and new concepts on the other to create meaningful change". on AllAboutJazz Glenn Astarita stated "they have seemingly cultured their overall approach with this new release. To that end, the musicians convey more of a “group” based vibe – partly due to less experimentation and more adherence to compositional attributes". Pitchfork reviewer Dominique Leone gave the album 7.5 out of 10 calling it "a solid effort from one of the most interesting artists in contemporary jazz".

== Track listing ==
All compositions by Jim Black

1. "Aloe Evra" - 6:43
2. "ICratic" - 6:17
3. "Cheepa Vs. Cheep" - 5:10
4. "You Were Out" - 2:35
5. "War Again Error" - 1:39
6. "Ble" - 6:32
7. "Myndir Now" - 8:12
8. "Ant Work Song" - 6:57
9. "Awkwarder" - 6:16
10. "Blissed (Selfchatter Mix)" - 12:03

== Personnel ==
- Jim Black - drums, black box with glowing screen, black rubber chaos pad, planica, buried guitar
- Chris Speed - clarinet, tenor saxophone, green box with silver buttons, tiny piano
- Hilmar Jensson - electric guitar, woodgrain box with black dials, other small boxes
- Skúli Sverrisson - electric bass, black box with glowing screens, attachables
