= Matt Mitchell (pianist) =

American jazz pianist and composer (born 1975)

- Born: July 19, 1975 (age 51)
- Genre: Jazz
- Occupations: Musician, composer
- Instrument: Piano
- Years active: Late 1990s–present
- Website: mattmitchell.us

Matthew Mitchell (born July 19, 1975) is an American jazz pianist and composer. He is also part of the faculty of the New York-based Center for Improvisational Music.

== Early life ==
Mitchell was born on July 19, 1975. He grew up in Exton, Pennsylvania. He first played the piano aged six, and composed from the age of 10. He had lessons in jazz and theory at a university from the age of 12. At this stage he was influenced by pianists Keith Jarrett and Herbie Hancock.

== Later life and career ==
Mitchell attended Indiana University for three years and then, in the late 1990s, he completed a master's degree at the Eastman School of Music and settled in New York. In 1999, he contacted saxophonist Tim Berne for some of his scores, but did not pursue the contact further at that point. Mitchell had various jobs in New York, but chose to return to Philadelphia. He then worked in a library at The University of the Arts for nine years before leaving when he had too many gigs to fit in.

In 2011, Mitchell had a sextet named Central Chain. In 2012, Mitchell introduced a new trio, with Chris Tordini on bass and Dan Weiss on drums. In the early 2010s, Mitchell was also part of Berne's Snakeoil band, and John Hollenbeck's Large Ensemble and Claudia Quintet.

In 2014, Mitchell joined Rudresh Mahanthappa's band, and recorded with the saxophonist later that year.

Mitchell has written and published several collections of études. His 2017 release A Pouting Grimace is"a 10-part suite extrapolated from a one-bar vamp reminiscent of Roscoe Mitchell's 1977 piece 'Nonaah'."

== Playing style ==
A New York Times reviewer commented in 2011 that Mitchell "feels close to the consensus language of straight-ahead jazz but wants to get beyond it. He does it with hands moving in independent parts, with polyrhythms, with music that approaches the technical level of études but that churns and whirls and leaves spaces for broad interpretation." Mitchell has been described as "a chameleon, able to take on completely different musical personas across of fast array of situations."

Another New York Times reviewer observed that "Mitchell has his guideposts as an improviser, including Paul Bley and Andrew Hill, pioneers of stubborn poise and self-containment". Mitchell's playing reflects a thorough understanding of his predecessors but remains powerfully singular: "Mitchell is special [...] because he weaves together understanding of perhaps four distinct and critical jazz piano traditions, pulling in impressionistic texture from Bill Evans/Herbie Hancock, ravenous but dynamic attack from Cecil Taylor/Don Pullen, the rhythmic rush of Bud Powell, and the comfort with abstract melodic logic of Paul Bley. Does Mitchell, therefore, sound schizophrenic or derivative? No – over and over he sounds like himself: the most complete and well-integrated improvising pianist of the last 15 years."

== Compositions ==
Mitchell commented that "I aim to think compositionally when improvising and think improvisationally when composing – trying to expand what is possible in both scenarios."

== Awards ==
Mitchell was awarded a Pew Fellowships in the Arts in 2012.

== Discography ==
An asterisk (*) indicates that the year is that of release.

=== As leader/co-leader ===
Year recorded	Title	Label	Personnel/Notes
2000	Adenium (v. 1)	Scrapple	As Kaktus; trio, with Aaron Meicht (trumpet), Lars Halle (drums)
2000	Adenium (v. 2)	Scrapple	As Kaktus; trio, with Aaron Meicht (trumpet), Lars Halle (drums)
2001	Sharing the Dry	Scrapple	As Kaktus; trio, with Aaron Meicht (trumpet), Lars Halle (drums)
2002	Feigner	Scrapple	As Feigner; trio, with Aaron Meicht (trumpet, electronics), Brendan Dougherty (drums, electronics)
2004	Laughter only Feigned Reproach	Scrapple	As Feigner; trio, with Aaron Meicht (electronics) and Brendan Dougherty (electronics)
2005	Vapor Squint, Antique Chromatic	Scrapple	Solo
2013*	Fiction	Pi	Duo, with Ches Smith (drums)
2015*	Vista Accumulation	Pi	Quartet, with Chris Speed (tenor sax, clarinet), Christopher Tordini (bass), Dan Weiss (drums)
2017*	Førage	Screwgun	Solo, performing the music of Tim Berne
2017*	A Pouting Grimace	Pi	With Scott Robinson (bass sax, contrabass clarinet), Jon Irabagon (soprano sax, sopranino sax), Ben Kono (oboe, English horn), Sara Schoenbeck (bassoon), Anna Webber (flute), Katie Andrews (harp), Patricia Brennan (vibraphone, marimba), Ches Smith (vibraphone, glockenspiel, marimba, timpani, percussion), Dan Weiss (tabla), Kim Cass (double bass), Kate Gentile (drums, percussion)
2018*	Angel Dusk	Screwgun	Duo, with Tim Berne (alto sax)
2019*	Phalanx Ambassadors	Pi	With Miles Okazaki (guitar), Patricia Brennan (vibraphone, marimba), Kim Cass (double bass), Kate Gentile (drums, percussion)
2020	Spiders	Out of Your Head	Duo, with Tim Berne (alto sax); in concert
2021	Snark Horse	Pi	Duo, co-led with Kate Gentile (drums); with guest appearances from the Snark Horsekestra (Kim Cass, Ben Gerstein, Jon Irabagon, Davy Lazar, Mat Maneri, Ava Mendoza, Matt Nelson, Brandon Seabrook)
2022	One More, Please	Intakt	Duo, with Tim Berne (alto sax)
2023	Illimitable	Obliquity	Solo
2024	Zealous Angles	Pi	Trio, with Chris Tordini (bass), Dan Weiss (drums)

=== As sideman ===
Year recorded	Leader	Title	Label
2003*	Thinking Plague	A History of Madness	Cuneiform
2004*	Thinking Plague	Upon Both Your Houses	Nearfest
2006*	Ralph Alessi	Anastomosi	Abeat
2011*	The Claudia Quintet	What Is the Beautiful?	Cuneiform
2011	Tim Berne	Snakeoil	ECM
2012*	Michael Attias	Spun Tree	Clean Feed Records
2012*	Darius Jones	Book of Mæ'bul (Another Kind of Sunrise)	AUM Fidelity
2012*	Mike Lorenz	Of the Woods	Mike Lorenz Music
2012	Dave Douglas	Be Still	Greenleaf Music
2013	Tim Berne	Shadow Man	ECM
2013	Dave Douglas	Time Travel	Greenleaf Music
2014*	Dan Weiss	Fourteen	Pi
2014*	Anna Webber	Simple	Skirl
2014	Rudresh Mahanthappa	Bird Calls	ACT
2015	Mario Pavone	Blue Dialect	Clean Feed Records
2015*	Dave Douglas	Brazen Heart	Greenleaf Music
2015*	Dave Douglas	Brazen Heart – Live at Jazz Standard	Greenleaf Music
2015	Tim Berne	You've Been Watching Me	ECM
2015*	Tineke Postma and Greg Osby	Sonic Halo	Challenge
2016*	Quinsin Nachoff	Flux	Mythology
2016	Sebastian Noelle	Shelter	Fresh Sound New Talent
2017	Steve Coleman	Morphogenesis	Pi
2017*	Mario Pavone	Chrome	Playscape
2017	Jonathan Finlayson	Moving Still	Pi
2017	Tim Berne	Incidentals	ECM
2017 (released 2018)	John Hollenbeck	All Can Work	New Amsterdam
2017	Yuriy Galkin	...For Its Beauty Alone	
2018*	Dan Weiss	Starebaby	Pi
2018	Jonathan Finlayson	3 Times Round	Pi
2018*	Quinsin Nachoff	Path of Totality	Whirlwind
2019	Sam Ospovat	Ride Angles	Skirl
2022	Miles Okazaki	Miniature America	Cygnus
2023	Miguel Zenón	Golden City	Miel Music
2024*	Kim Cass	Levs	Pi
