= Matthias Lupri =

German jazz vibraphonist

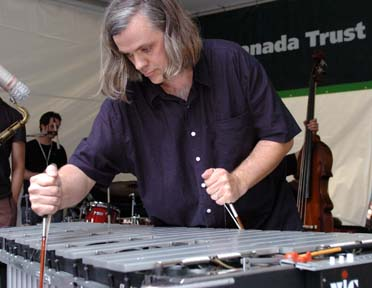
Matthias Lupri using two cello bows on a vibraphone with electronic pickups, Vancouver Jazz Festival 2005.

Matthias Albrecht Lupri (born 29 October 1964 in Germany) is a jazz musician who plays the vibraphone.

== History ==
Lupri grew up in Manhattan, Kansas, and Alberta, Canada. Initially he played the drums, and as a teenager played in blues, rock, and country music bands. In his early 20s he studied music at Mount Royal College, where he heard Gary Burton's recordings and became interested in jazz vibraphone music. Lupri practiced the instrument for the next five years while on the road with rock bands as a drummer. He then enrolled at the Berklee College of Music in Boston to study with Gary Burton himself. Since graduating Lupri's CDs have charted in radio's Top 40 GAVIN, CMJ, and Chart Magazine Canada, and were heard on the TV show “ALIAS.” Lupri was also named as a rising artist on vibraphone in Down Beat critics poll for the 2nd time in 2005.

Performances/Recordings Lupri has worked with Greg Osby, Chris Potter, Kurt Rosenwinkel, Mark Turner, Donny McCaslin, Myron Walden, Greg Hutchinson, Antonio Sanchez, Reuben Rogers, Ian Froman, George Garzone, Jeff Ballard, Rick Margitza, Cuong Vu, Sebastiaan de Krom, and Boris Wiedenfeld as well as at international jazz festivals such as the Montreal Jazz Festival, North Sea, Atlanta, Litchfield, Ottawa, Minneapolis, Vancouver, Providence, Toronto, Boston, Clearwater, Seattle, and Jacksonville.

== Recordings as leader ==
- After Hours, Moonlamps and other Ballads - Summit Records DCD 549 with Kurt Rosenwinkel, Mark Turner, Reuben Rogers and Greg Hutchinson, Cuong Vu, George Garzone, John Lockwood, Sebastiaan de Krom, Timo Verbole, Florian Feuser, Myron Walden, Nate Radley, Thomson Kneeland, Jordan Perlson, and Donny McCaslin (2011)
- Metalix - Summit Records SMT 445 with Myron Walden and Donny McCaslin (2006)
- Transition Sonic - Summit Records DCD 398 with Cuong Vu (Pat Metheny), Mark Turner (Kurt Rosenwinkel) (2004)
- Same Time Twice - Summit Records DCD 337 with Kurt Rosenwinkel, Mark Turner, Reuben Rogers, and Greg Hutchinson (2002)
- Shadow of the Vibe - Chartmaker CMG 5060 with George Garzone, John Lockwood, and Sebastiaan de Krom (1999)
- Window Up Window Down - Chartmaker PDP1060 with Timo Verbole, Florian Feuser, and Sebastiaan de Krom (1998)
