= Habyor =

Studio album by Jim Black and AlasNoAxis
- Released: August 3, 2004
- Recorded: 2004
- Genre: Improvised music, jazz
- Length: 51:52
- Label: Winter & Winter 910 073
- Producer: Stefan Winter

Jim Black chronology
Splay (2002)	Habyor (2004)	Dogs of Great Indifference (2006)

Habyor is the third album by drummer Jim Black's AlasNoAxis featuring clarinetist/saxophonist Chris Speed, guitarist Hilmar Jensson and bassist Skúli Sverrisson recorded in 2004 and released on the Winter & Winter label.

== Reception ==
Professional ratings
Review scores
Source	Rating
Allmusic	4.5/5 stars
AllAboutJazz	4/5 stars

In his review for Allmusic, Sean Westergaard said " this isn't really a jazz album. It's a rock album, but they use a horn player instead of a singer. Despite what some jazz purists may say, this doesn't make the music any less interesting or less valuable. In fact, if it's taken at face value, without expectations, it's a great album". On AllAboutJazz John Kelman stated "Habyor may not make fans of purist jazz fans, but with singable melodies over mostly assertive rhythms, he creates engaging music that may draw more rock-oriented listeners over to the "dark side"." In JazzTimes, Bill Milkowski observed "Black has crafted a distinctive collection that goes for the simplicity of songs and the power of a unified band sound".

== Track listing ==
All compositions by Jim Black

1. "Talk About" - 4:04
2. "Z" - 4:25
3. "Rade" - 6:45
4. "Cha" - 5:28
5. "Part Wolf" - 5:56
6. "Hello Kombiant" - 3:28
7. "Let It Down" - 6:05
8. "Be Real" - 4:32
9. "Endgatherers" - 6:39
10. "Stay Go" - 4:21

== Personnel ==
- Jim Black - drums, Wurlitzer piano, melodica, handsonic
- Chris Speed - clarinet, tenor saxophone, Wurlitzer piano, accordion, casiotone
- Hilmar Jensson - electric guitar
- Skúli Sverrisson - electric bass
