= The Spiritual Bonding =

Studio album by Vidna Obmana
- Released: 1994
- Genre: Ambient
- Length: 58:39
- Label: Extreme
- Producer: Steve Roach

Vidna Obmana chronology
Echoing Delight (1993)	The Spiritual Bonding (1994)	Parallel Flaming (1994)

Professional ratings
Review scores
Source	Rating
Allmusic	3/5 stars

The Spiritual Bonding is an album by Vidna Obmana, released in 1994 through Extreme Records.

== Track listing ==
All tracks are written by Vidna Obmana

No.	Title	Length
1.	"The Feather Cycle"	11:22
2.	"Spatial Prophecy (Song of the Tribal)"	11:05
3.	"Challenging Boundaries"	5:27
4.	"The Spiritual Bonding"	12:16
5.	"The Interior Journey"	4:38
6.	"Earth Dangling"	4:14
7.	"From the Stepping Stone"	4:32
8.	"The Nebulous Pathway"	5:42

== Personnel ==
Musicians

- Alio Die – instruments, recording
- Vidna Obmana – instruments, arrangement, recording, photography
- Djen Ajakan Shean – instruments
- Robert Rich – instruments, recording
- Steve Roach – instruments, production, mixing, recording

Production and additional personnel

- Extreme Graphics – illustrations
- Martine Verhoeven – photography
