= Yuriy Galkin =

Russian double-bassist and jazz composer

Yuriy Galkin is a double-bassist and jazz composer of Russian origin, based in the United States.

== Early life and education ==
Galkin was born in Russia and moved to the United Kingdom in 2005. He studied at the Gnessin Russian Academy of Music and earned a master's degree in aeronautical engineering. While at the Royal Academy of Music in London, Galkin studied under Jeff Clyne, Duncan Hopkins, Gerard Presencer and Pete Churchill.

== Career ==
Galkin's compositions were performed by Tim Garland's Northern Underground Orchestra. In the late-2000s, Galkin founded the nine-piece Symbiosis Jazz Orchestra performing his own compositions. In October 2009, the orchestra recorded its first CD, which contained seven of Galkin's original works; it was released by the F-IRE Collective. Galkin's composition "Evolvent" won the 2010 Dankworth Prize for Jazz Composition.

Galkin moved to New York City in 2017. There, he recorded his second album, ...For Its Beauty Alone, which was released in 2019 and featured saxophonist David Binney, pianist Matt Mitchell, and drummer Rudy Royston.
