= George Schuller =

American jazz drummer (born 1958)

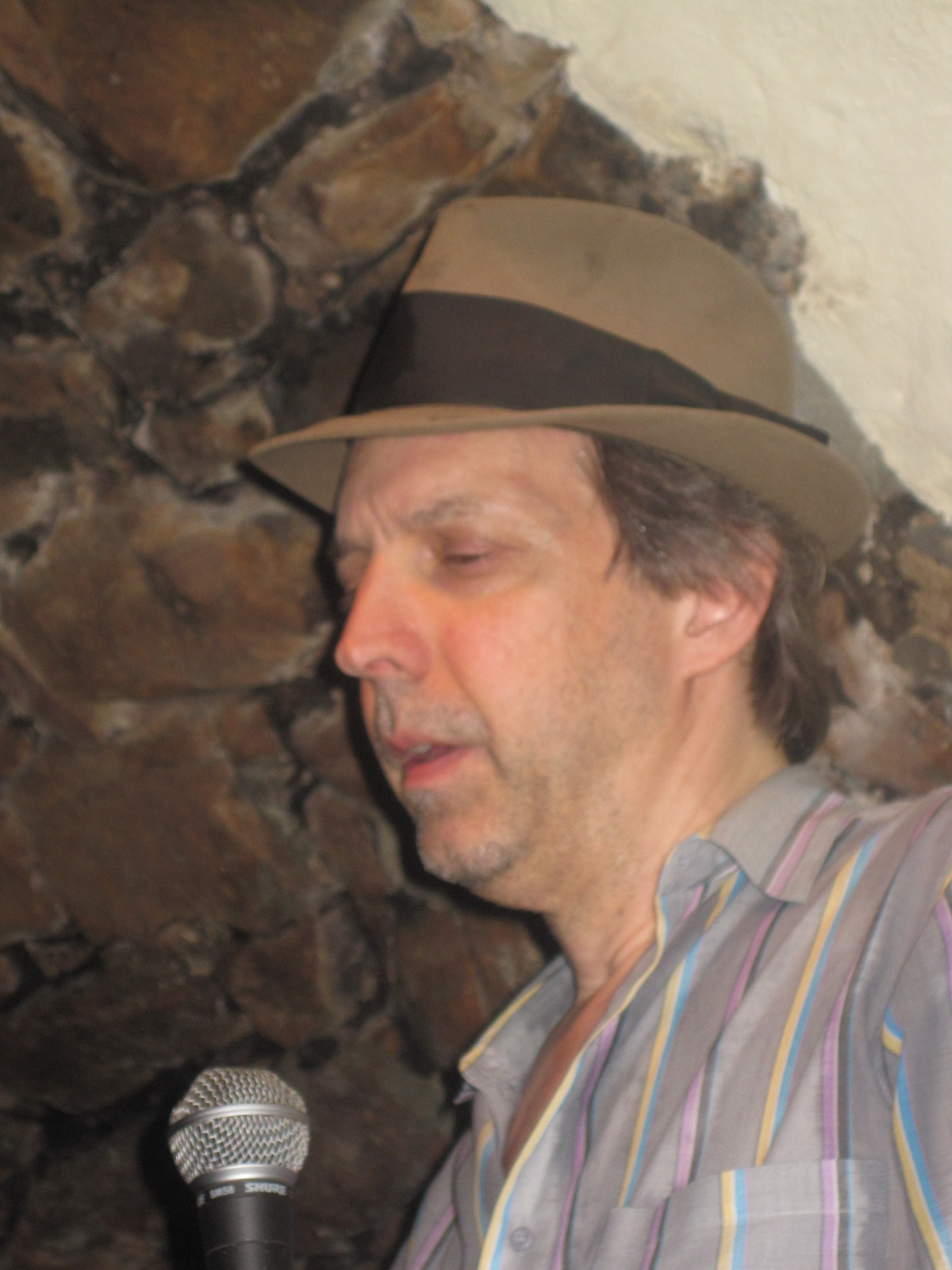
- George Schuller as bandleader in 2012

Background information
- Born: December 29, 1958 (age 67); New York City
- Genres: Jazz
- Occupation: Musician
- Instrument: Drums
- Years active: 1980s–present
- Label: GM
- Formerly of: Orange Then Blue
- Website: georgeschuller.net

George Schuller (born December 29, 1958) is an American jazz drummer. He is the son of composer Gunther Schuller.

== Biography ==
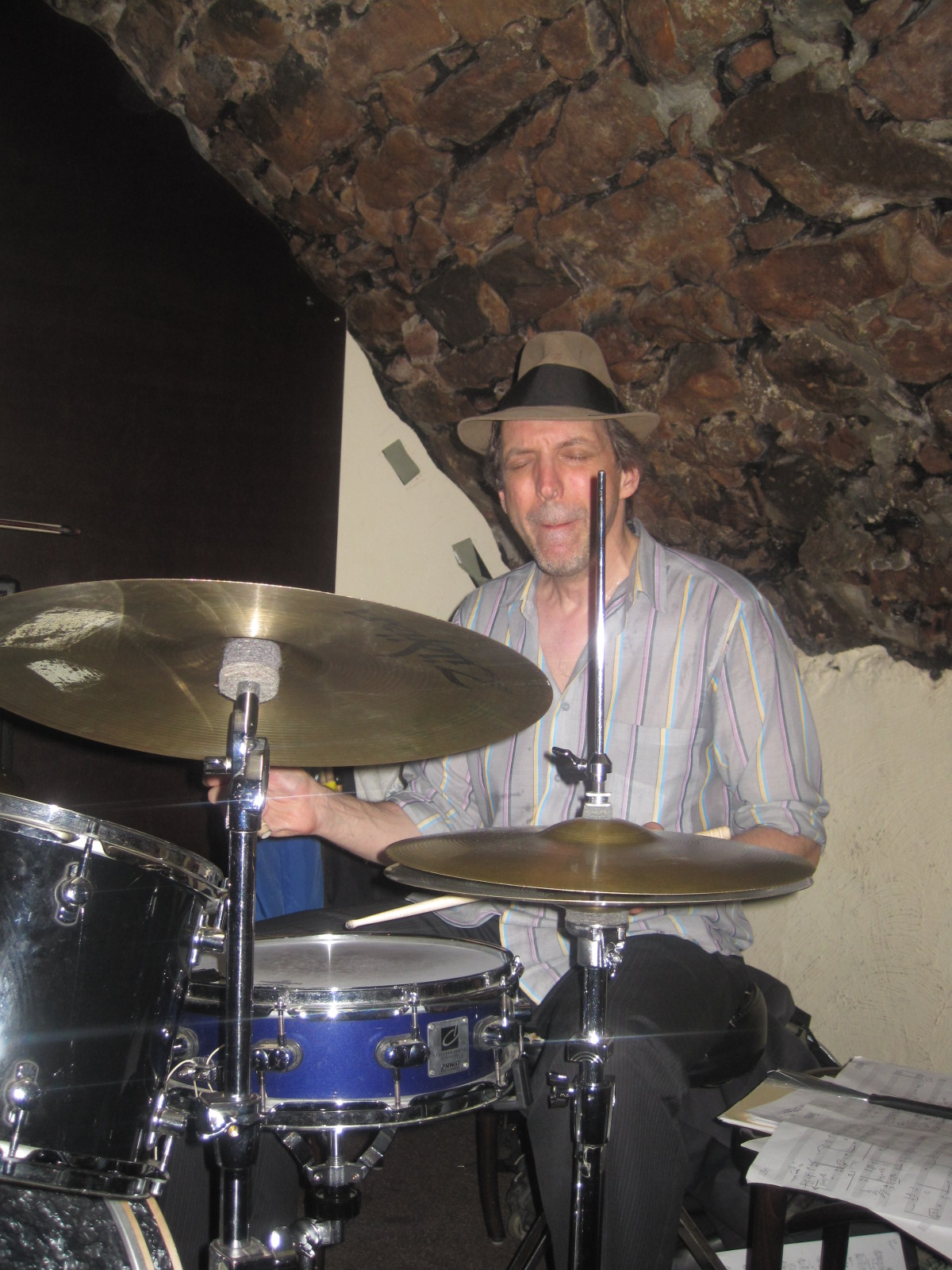
George Schuller in concert, 2012

Schuller was born in New York City and raised in Boston. In 1982 he graduated from the New England Conservatory of Music with a degree in jazz performance. He performed with Herb Pomeroy, Ran Blake, George Garzone, and Jaki Byard. In 1984 he started the band Orange Then Blue. Ten years later he moved to Brooklyn and led the bands Chump Change, Schulldogs, and Jiggle. He has also worked with Dave Douglas, Nnenna Freelon, Lee Konitz, and Joe Lovano.

== Discography ==
=== As leader ===
- Lookin' Up from Down Below (GM, 1989)
- Tenor Tantrums (New World, 1999)
- Hellbent (Playscape, 2002)
- Round 'Bout Now (Playscape, 2003)
- Jigsaw (482 Music, 2004)

With Conference Call

- Spirals: The Berlin Concert (482 Music, 2004)
- Poetry in Motion (Clean Feed, 2008)
- What About...? (Not Two, 2010)
- Seven (Not Two, 2013)

With Orange Then Blue

- Music for Jazz Orchestra (GM, 1987)
- Live Where Were You? (GM, 1989)
- Funkallero (GM, 1991)
- While You Were Out (GM, 1994)
- Hold the Elevator (GM, 1999)

=== As sideman ===
With Jason Robinson

- Resonant Geographies (pfMENTUM, 2018)
- The Two Faces of Janus (Cuneiform, 2010)
- Tiresian Symmetry (Cuneiform, 2012)

With others

- Mike Baggetta, Thieves and Secrets (Fresh Sound, 2013)
- Ran Blake, Film Noir (Arista Novus, 1980)
- Ran Blake, Sonic Temples (GM, 2001)
- Armen Donelian, Oasis (Sunnyside, 2008)
- Armen Donelian, Sayat-Nova: Songs of My Ancestors (Sunnyside, 2014)
- Joe Fonda, Carlo Morena, A Drop of Water (Konnex, 2008)
- Burton Greene, Ins and Outs (CIMP, 2006)
- Steve Kirby, Point of Balance (A, 1998)
- Joe Lovano, Rush Hour (Blue Note, 1995)
- Eugene Maslov, Autumn in New England (Brownstone, 1994)
- Gunther Schuller, Jumpin' in the Future (GM, 1988)
- Luciana Souza, An Answer to Your Silence (NYC, 1998)
- Tom Varner, The Window Up Above (New World, 1998)
