= Extreme Records =

Australian record label

Extreme Records is an Australia-based record label.

The label was founded by Ulex Xane and initially specialised in underground experimental and industrial cassettes. Roger Richards became involved in 1987 and eventually became the label's director after Xane's departure.

== List of releases ==
No.	Year	Artist	Title	Format
001	1989	Paul Schütze	Deus Ex Machina	CD
002	1990	Muslimgauze	Intifaxa	CD
003	1989	Laughing Hands	Ledge / Dog Photos	CD
004	1991	The Makers of the Dead Travel Fast	G'arage D'Or	CD
005	1990	Paul Schütze	The Annihilating Angel; or, The Surface of the World	CD
006	1991	John Duncan	Klaar	CD
007	1991	Muslimgauze	United States of Islam	CD
008	1991	Merzbow / Right Brain Audile	Music for Bondage Performance	CD
009	1991	Jim O'Rourke	Tamper	CD
010	1991	Various artists	X – X Section	CD
011	1990	Peter Appleton	Songs From the Shed	CD
012	1992	Muslimgauze	Zul'm	CD
013	1992	C-Schulz	4. Film Ton	CD
014	1991	Stefan Tischler	Excess of Free Speech	CD
015	1992	Paul Schütze	New Maps of Hell	CD
016	1992	Shinjuku Thief	Bloody Tourist	CD
017	1992	Mo Boma	Jijimuge	CD
018	1993	Jim O'Rourke	Remove the Need	CD
019	1991	Christoph Heemann	Invisible Barrier	CD
020	1993	Elliott Sharp & Soldier String Quartet	Cryptid Fragments	CD
021	1993	Jorge Reyes	El Costumbre	CD
022	1993	Vidna Obmana	Echoing Delight	CD
023	1993	Lights in a Fat City	Sound Column	CD
024	1993	Otomo Yoshihide	The Night Before the Death of the Sampling Virus	CD
025	1994	Mo Boma	Myths of the Near Future Part One	CD
026	1994	Muslimgauze	Citadel	CD
027	1994	Vidna Obmana	The Spiritual Bonding	CD
028	1994	Soma	Hollow Earth	CD
029	1995	Social Interiors	The World Behind You	CD
030	1995	Pablo's Eye	You Love Chinese Food	CD
031	1995	Land	Land	CD
032	1995	Vidna Obmana	Echoing Delight	CD
033	1995	Groovy	Groovy	CD
034	1996	Merzbow / Right Brain Audile	Music for Bondage Performance 2	CD
035	1996	Mo Boma	Myths of the Near Future Part Three	CD
036	1996	Kato Hideki	Hope & Despair	CD
037	1996	Fetisch Park	Trost	CD
038	1996	Soma	The Inner Cinema	CD
039	1997	Skúli Sverrisson	Seremonie	CD
040	1997	Social Interiors	Traces of Mercury	CD
041	1997	Various artists	Untitled (Ten)	CD
042	1997	Fetisch Park	Alluvial	CD
043	1997	Ed Pias	Ancestor's Halo	CD
044	1999	Rik Rue	Sample / Shuffle / Interplay	CD
045	1998	Otomo Yoshihide & Sachiko M	Filament 1	CD
046	1998	Eugene Thacker	Sketches for Biotech Research	CD
047	1999	Maju	Maju-1	CD
048	1999	Christian Kiefer	Welcome to Hard Times	CD
049	1999	Maju	Maju-2	CD
050	2000	Ether	Music for Air Raids	CD
051	2001	Maju	Maju-3	CD
052	2001	Various artists	Serpentine	CD
053	2002	Christian Kiefer	Medicine Show	CD
054	2002	Ether	Hush	CD
055	2003	Maju	Maju-4	CD
056	2006	Claudio Parodi	Horizontal Mover (Homage to Alvin Lucier)	CD
057	2007	Terminal Sound System	Compressor	CD
058	2007	Scott Tinkler	Backwards	CD
059	2007	Robert Vincs	Devic Kingdom	CD
060	2007	Luca Formentini	Tacet	CD
061	2007	Marc Hannaford	Hush	CD
062	2008	Claudio Parodi	A Ritual Which Is Incomprehensible (To the Smile of Pauline Oliveros)	CD
063	2008	Maju	Maju-5	CD
065	2008	Terminal Sound System	Constructing Towers	CD
067	2009	Claudio Parodi	The Mother of All Feedback	CD
069	2009	Marc Hannaford	Polar	CD
070	2011	Robert Vincs	Pneumatikos	CD
071	2014	Thomas Buckner, Claudio Parodi	Taken From a True Story	CD

== See also ==
- Lists of record labels
