= Morphogenesis (album) =

Studio album by Steve Coleman
- Released: 2017
- Recorded: September 23–25, 2016
- Studio: Systems Two (Brooklyn, New York); TidbiT Sound (Philadelphia, Pennsylvania)
- Genre: Jazz
- Length: 60:34
- Label: Pi Recordings
- Producer: Steve Coleman

Steve Coleman chronology
Synovial Joints (2016)	Morphogenesis (2017)

Morphogenesis is an album by American jazz saxophonist Steve Coleman, which was recorded in 2016 and released on Pi Recordings.

== Background ==
The band Natal Eclipse, assembled specifically for the project, includes musicians who have long been in Coleman's circle: trumpeter Jonathan Finlayson, vocalist Jen Shyu, and tenor saxophonist María Grand. They are joined by pianist Matt Mitchell and some musicians who typically perform in a classical music context: clarinetist Rane Moore, violinist Kristin Lee, bassist Greg Chudzik, and percussionist Neeraj Mehta. Most of the compositions are inspired by movements in boxing.

== Reception ==
Professional ratings
Review scores
Source	Rating
Down Beat	5/5 stars

The Down Beat review by James Hale states, "Morphogenesis sounds like another high point in the leader's ongoing journey to create his own language."

The PopMatters review by Will Layman notes, "The remarkable strength of Steve Coleman's recent work is that he has found a way to make his music more complex, more diverse, and more appealing all at once."

The Point of Departure review by Troy Collins states, "More so than many of his recent efforts, Morphogenesis stands as a key document in the development of Coleman's compositional progress."

== Track listing ==
All compositions by Steve Coleman.

1. "Inside Game" – 9:35
2. "Pull Counter" – 5:18
3. "Roll Under and Angles" – 4:31
4. "NOH" – 4:39
5. "Morphing" – 14:08
6. "Shoulder Roll" – 5:10
7. "SPAN" – 3:45
8. "Dancing and Jabbing" – 6:58
9. "Horda" – 6:30

== Personnel ==
- Steve Coleman – alto saxophone
- Matt Mitchell – acoustic piano
- Greg Chudzik – bass
- Neeraj Mehta – percussion (3, 4, 6, 7, 9)
- Maria Grand – tenor saxophone
- Rane Moore – clarinet
- Jonathan Finlayson – trumpet
- Kristin Lee – violin
- Jen Shyu – vocals

=== Production ===
- Seth Rosner – executive producer
- Yulun Wang – executive producer
- Steve Coleman – executive producer, producer, mixing
- Joe Marciano – recording
- Max Ross – recording
- Anthony Tidd – mixing
- Simon Grendene – artwork, design
- Dimitri Louis – photography
