= The Veil (album) =

Live album by bb&c (Tim Berne, Jim Black & Nels Cline
- Released: June 7, 2011
- Recorded: July 30, 2009; The Stone, NYC
- Genre: Free improvisation
- Length: 58:27
- Label: Cryptogramophone; CG144
- Producer: Nels Cline & Jeff Gauthier

Nels Cline chronology
The Celestial Septet (2008)	The Veil (2011)	Initiate (2010)

The Veil is a live album by bb&c, Tim Berne, Jim Black & Nels Cline, which was released in June 2011 on the Cryptogramophone label.

== Reception ==
Professional ratings
Review scores
Source	Rating
Allmusic	4.5/5 stars
The Guardian	4/5 stars
All About Jazz	4.5/5 stars
PopMatters	8/10

The Allmusic review by Phil Freeman awarded the album 4½ stars out of 5, stating "This is a fierce, scorching CD that fans of each of these three musicians (and their fan bases have a great deal of overlap) will find highly enjoyable and exciting". The Guardian's John Fordham rated the album 4 stars out of 5, saying, "If there is a power trio fit to set the bar for a contemporary conjunction of free jazz, experimental funk, guitar improv and sound-painting noise, then this is it". Writing for All About Jazz, Troy Collins stated "Throughout the album's 58 minute duration, Berne, Black and Cline evoke the raw beauty of urban modernism in an array of expressionistic paeans, from the acerbic salvos of the opener to the sublime rubato lyricism of the closing meditation". PopMatters' John Garratt stated "The Veil goes everywhere in its 58 minutes, trading rawk riffs with fluttered, sputtered seizures that make you almost think the disc has an encoding error.".

== Track listing ==
All compositions by Tim Berne, Jim Black and Nels Cline

1. "Railroaded" - 6:12
2. "Impairment Posse" - 3:37
3. "Momento" - 6:05
4. "The Barbarella Syndrome" - 9:32
5. "The Dawn of the Lawn" - 5:50
6. "Rescue Her" - 8:30
7. "The Veil" - 5:23
8. "Tiny Moment (Part 1)" - 5:02
9. "Tiny Moment (Part 2)" - 8:18

== Personnel ==
- Tim Berne - alto saxophone
- Jim Black - drums, laptop
- Nels Cline – guitar, effects
