= Andrew D'Angelo =

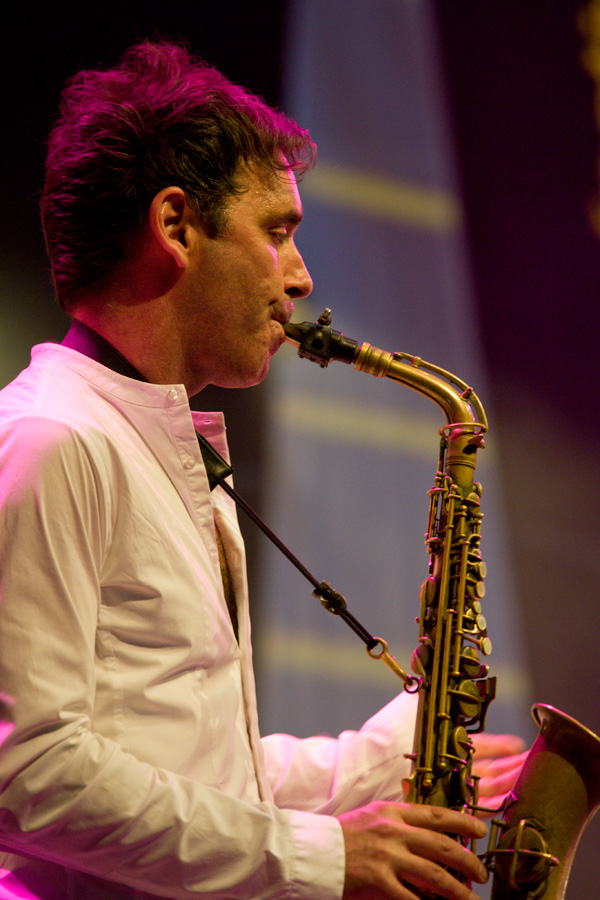
- D'Angelo at the 2012 Moers Festival

Background information
- Born: Andrew Norman D'Angelo; November 2, 1965 (age 60); Greeley, Colorado
- Genres: Jazz
- Occupation: Musician
- Instruments: Clarinet, saxophone
- Website: andrewdangelo.com

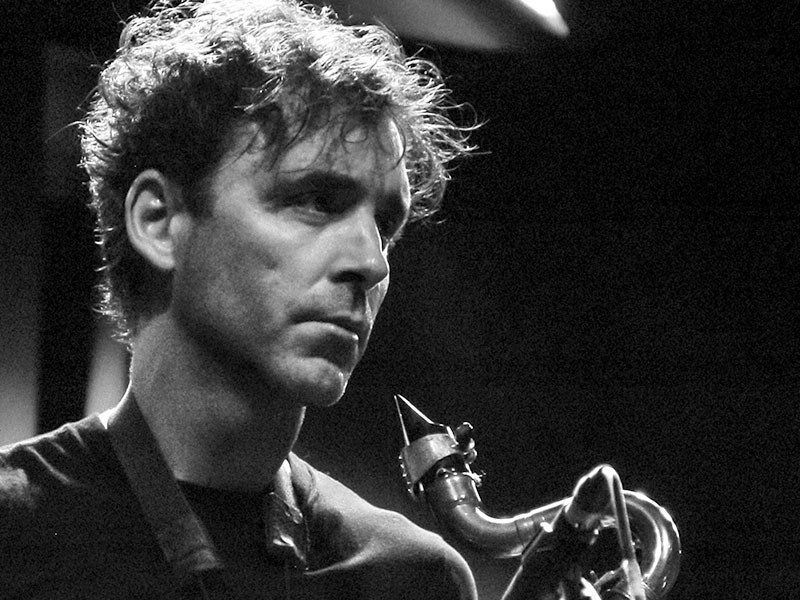
Andrew D'Angelo in Aarhus Denmark, 2014

Andrew D'Angelo (born November 2, 1965) is an American jazz musician.

== Career ==
Andrew Norman D'Angelo was born in Greeley, Colorado on November 2, 1965. He grew up in Seattle, Washington, and began playing professionally at the age of 14. In Seattle he played in Fred Radke’s big band as a teenager with fellow jazz musicians Chris Speed and Jim Black. In 1986, at the age of 20, he moved to New York City.

From 1987 to 1992 D'Angelo was based in Boston, Massachusetts where he was active as a member of the bands Orange Then Blue and the Either/Orchestra. In 1987 he reunited with Speed and Black to co-founded the band Human Feel (HF) along with guitarist Kurt Rosenwinkel; releasing their first album four years later, Scatter (1991). D'Angelo concurrently led the big band Standard Deviation from 1990 until 1992 when he moved back to New York City. By 1993 the entire HF band was living in New York, and their the group recorded the albums Welcome to Malpesta (1994) and Speak to it (1995).

D'Angelo remained active with HF until 1996; although the group later reunited periodically including for a 2014 concert tour. He led the bands Smack for Some (1994–6), In Hear (1995–7), and Squawnk (from 1997). Squawnk, a jazz trio featuring Ben Street on bass and Jeff Ballard on drums, released its first album in 2000 on the Lyceum label; a record label co-founded by Curtis Hasselbring and D'Angelo. He played on Ed Schuller's 1996 album The Force. He has also performed in bands with drummer Matt Wilson, keyboardist Jamie Saft, and trumpeter Cuong Vu, and has performed and recorded with the Reid Anderson Quintet, Erik Friedlander, and Bobby Previte.

D'Angelo has composed music for big band, chamber music, string ensembles, and soloists. From 1995 to 1997 he presented three annual concerts of chamber music he composed at the Knitting Factory with participating instrumentalists including trumpeter Dave Douglas; saxophonists Peter Epstein and Andy Laster; and guitarist Brad Shepik among others. With his band Make Music he collaborated with pianist Josh Roseman and tenor saxophonist Bill McHenry. His trio Morthana released the albuma Skadra Degis (2008, Skirl Records) and Norman (2014) with drummer Jim Black and bassistr Trevor Dunn.

== Personal life ==
D'Angelo is gay. In January 2008 he was diagnosed with a brain tumor after experiencing a seizure while driving. He had multiple surgeries to treat cancer; ultimately having the right frontal lobe of his brain removed.

== Discography ==
=== As leader ===
- Terpsichorea #2 (Falcata-Galia, 2002)
- Torn Between Two Horses (Duration, 2005)
- Skadra Degis (Skirl, 2008)
- Norman (Human Use, 2014)
- DNA Orchestra (Human Use, 2020)

With Human Feel

- Human Feel (Human Use, 1989)
- Scatter (GM, 1991)
- Welcome to Malpesta (New World, 1994)
- Speak to It (Songlines, 1996)
- Galore (Skirl, 2007)
- Gold (Intakt, 2019)

With Bureau of Atomic Tourism

- Arco Idaho (Rat/Bureau of Atomic Tourism, 2013)
- Second Law of Thermodynamics (Rat/Bureau of Atomic Tourism, 2013)
- Scintigraphy (Rat/Bureau of Atomic Tourism, 2014)
- Spinning Jenny (Rat/Bureau of Atomic Tourism, 2014)
- Hapax Legomena (Rat/Bureau of Atomic Tourism, 2015)

=== As sideman ===
With Erik Friedlander

- Chimera (Avant, 1995)
- Iza (MP3.com, 1996)
- The Watchman (Tzadik, 1996)

With Hilmar Jensson

- Dofinn (Jazzis, 1995)
- Kerfill (Smekkleysa, 1999)
- Tyft (Songlines, 2002)
- Ditty Blei (Songlines, 2004)

With Matt Wilson

- Going Once Going Twice (Palmetto, 1998)
- Humidity (Palmetto, 2003)
- Smile (Palmetto, 1999)
- That's Gonna Leave a Mark (Palmetto, 2009)

With others

- Jakob Bro, Hymnotic/Salmodisk (Loveland, 2015)
- Either/Orchestra, The Brunt (Accurate, 1994)
- Either/Orchestra, Across the Omniverse (Accurate, 1996)
- Chris Lightcap, Deluxe (Clean Feed, 2010)
- Orange Then Blue, Hold the Elevator (GM, 1999)
- Bobby Previte, Too Close to the Pole (Enja, 1996)
- Kurt Rosenwinkel, Heartcore (Verve, 2003)
- Jamie Saft & Cuong Vu, Ragged Jack (Avant, 1996)
- Ken Schaphorst, After Blue (Accurate, 1991)
- Ed Schuller, The Force (Tutu, 1996)
- Gunhild Seim, Time Jungle (Drollehala, 2007)

== Bibliography ==
- Richard Cook, Brian Morton: The Penguin Guide to Jazz Recordings. 8th edition. Penguin, London 2006, ISBN 0-141-02327-9.
