= Skúli Sverrisson =

Icelandic composer and bass guitarist (born 1966)

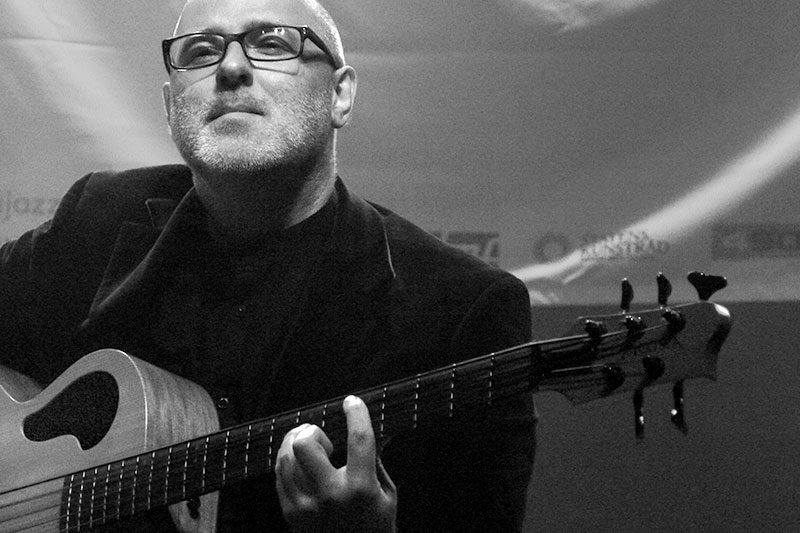

Background information
- Born: 23 October 1966 (age 60); Reykjavík, Iceland
- Genres: Jazz, jazz fusion
- Occupations: Musician, composer
- Instrument: Bass guitar
- Labels: Extreme, 12 Tónar
- Website: www.skulisverrisson.com

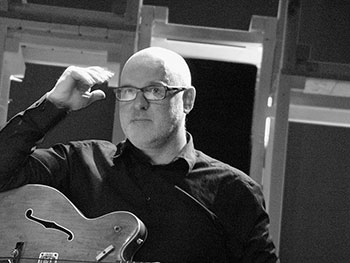
Skúli Sverrisson

Skúli Sverrisson (born 23 October 1966) is an Icelandic composer and bass guitarist.

He has worked with musicians Wadada Leo Smith, Derek Bailey, Lou Reed, Jon Hassell, David Sylvian, Arto Lindsay, and composers Ryuichi Sakamoto, Jóhann Jóhannsson, and Hildur Guðnadóttir. He is known for his work as artistic director for Ólöf Arnalds, recordings with Blonde Redhead, and as musical director for Laurie Anderson.

Skúli released duo albums with Anthony Burr, Oskar Gudjonsson, and Hilmar Jensson. He has been a member of Pachora, Alas No Axis, the Allan Holdsworth group, and the Ben Monder group. His solo works include Seremonie in 1997 and Sería in 2006. Seria was chosen Best Album of the Year by the Icelandic Music Awards. Skúli plays dobro, double bass, and charango, in addition to bass guitar.

He has composed music for the Icelandic Dance Company (Open Source), the National Theatre of Iceland (Volva), and films and installations such as Welcome and Music for Furniture with Olafur Thordason, Spatial Meditation with Claudia Hill, and When it was Blue with filmmaker Jennifer Reeves.

Skúli founded Seria, an ensemble featuring Amedeo Pace, Ólöf Arnalds, David Thor Jonsson, Anthony Burr, Eyvind Kang, and Hildur Guðnadóttir in 2005. He released Seria in 2006 and Seria ll in 2010. Skúli has won five Icelandic Music Awards, including Icelandic Album of the Year for Seria in 2006.

He has appeared on over one hundred recordings and has performed with Hildur Guðnadóttir, Hilmar Jensson, Jim Black, Chris Speed, Anthony Burr, Laurie Anderson, Allan Holdsworth, Ryuichi Sakamoto, David Sylvian, Blonde Redhead, Yungchen Lhamo, Jamshied Sharifi, Ólöf Arnalds, Pachora, and Alas No Axis. He was a part of Mo Boma with Jamshied Sharifi and Carsten Tiedemann, releasing four albums on Extreme; "Jijimuge", "Myths of the Near Future - Part One", "Myths of the Near Future - Part Two" and "Myths of the Near Future - Part Three".

== Discography ==
- 1991 – Secret Stories, Full Circle (Sony)
- 1992 – Poetry of Joseph Kopf, Peter Herbert (Extraplatte)
- 1992 – Jijimuge, Mo Boma (Extreme)
- 1993 – Hard Hat Area, Allan Holdsworth (Restless)
- 1994 – Myths of the Near Future Part One, Mo Boma (Extreme)
- 1995 – Myths of the Near Future Part Two, Mo Boma (Extreme)
- 1995 – Dofinn, Hilmar Jensson (Is Jazz)
- 1995 – Blonde Redhead, Blonde Redhead (Smells Like)
- 1996 – Myths of the Near Future Part Three, Mo Boma (Extreme)
- 1996 – Esprit, Kazumi Watanabe, (Polygram)
- 1997 – Seremonie, Skúli Sverrisson (Extreme)
- 1997 – Prayer for the Soul of Layla, Jamshied Sharifi (Alula)
- 1997 – No Boat, Ben Monder (Songlines)
- 1997 – Extreme 10, Skúli Sverrisson (Extreme)
- 1998 – Kjár, Skúli Sverrisson & Hilmar Jensson (Bad Taste)
- 1998 – Bushes and Briars, Susan McKeown (Alula)
- 1998 – Pachora, Pachora (Knitting Factory)
- 1998 – Unn, Pachora (Knitting Factory)
- 1998 – Dabilen Harria, Ruper Ordorika (Nuevos Medios)
- 1999 – Desist, Skúli Sverrisson & Anthony Burr (Staalplaat)
- 1999 – Yeah No, Chris Speed (Songlines)
- 1999 – Deviantics, Chris Speed (Songlines)
- 1999 – Ast, Pachora (Knitting Factory)
- 2000 – AlasNoAxis, Jim Black's AlasNoAxis (Winter & Winter)
- 2000 – Origami, Theo Bleckmann (Songlines)
- 2000 – The Well, Brad Shepik (Songlines)
- 2000 – Marinade, Mark Dresser (Tzadik)
- 2000 – In His Own Sweet Way, Pachora (Avant)
- 2000 – Excavation, Ben Monder (Arabesque)
- 2000 – Emit, Chris Speed (Songlines)
- 2001 – Life on a String, Laurie Anderson (Nonesuch)
- 2001 – Splay, Jim Black's AlasNoAxis (Winter & Winter)
- 2001 – Klif, Jóel Pálsson (Omi)
- 2001 – Live at Town Hall, Laurie Anderson (Nonesuch)
- 2001 – Napoli 23, Napoli 23 (Bad Taste)
- 2001 – After Silence, Skúli Sverrisson & Óskar Guðjónsson (Omi)
- 2002 – Asterotypical, Pachora (Winter & Winter)
- 2002 – Iceman Is, Terje Isungset (Jazzland/Universal)
- 2003 – World Citizen, David Sylvian & Ryuichi Sakamoto (Samadhisound)
- 2003 – Quartet Lucy, John Hollenbeck (CRI)
- 2003 – Voice in the Wilderness, Pachora (Tzadik)
- 2004 – Swell Henry, Chris Speed (Squealer)
- 2004 – Habyor, Jim Black's AlasNoAxis (Winter & Winter)
- 2004 – One, Jamshied Sharifi (Alula)
- 2004 – Misery is a Butterfly, Blonde Redhead (4AD)
- 2005 – Virðulegir Forsetar, Jóhann Jóhannsson (Touch)
- 2005 – Oceana, Ben Monder (Arabesque)
- 2005 – Marmorere, Peter Scherer (Peter Scherer)
- 2005 – A 1000 Incidents Arise, Skúli Sverrisson & Anthony Burr (Worker's Institute)
- 2005 – Dogs of Great Indifference, Jim Black's AlasNoAxis (Winter & Winter)
- 2005 – Ama, Yungchen Lhamo (Real World)
- 2006 – Bricolage, Ruyichi Sakamoto (KAB)
- 2006 – Seria, Skúli Sverrisson (12 Tonar)
- 2006 – Family Album, Kitchen Motors (Bad Taste)
- 2007 – 23, Blonde Redhead (4AD)
- 2007 – Illusionista, Bass Instinct (Erschienen)
- 2007 – Við og Við, Ólof Arnalds (12 tonar)
- 2007 – Jostojoo, Mamak Khadem (Mamak Khadem)
- 2007 – Cycles, Einar Scheving (Valdis)
- 2008 – Aero, Ghostdigital (Bad Taste)
- 2009 – Without Sinking, Hildur Guðnadottir (Touch)
- 2009 – Iridescence, Hildur Guðnadottir (Touch)
- 2009 – Houseplant, Jim Black's AlasNoAxis (Winter & Winter)
- 2009 – Haizea Garizumakoa, Ruper Ordorika (Elkar)
- 2009 – Spiritual Dimensions, Wadada Leo Smith (Cuneiform)
- 2009 – Out of Noise, Ruyichi Sakamoto (Commmon)
- 2010 – Butterfly, Base Instinct Zappel (Music)
- 2010 – Homeland, Laurie Anderson (Nonesuch)
- 2010 – Innundir Skinni, Ólof Arnalds (One Little Indian)
- 2010 – Seria ll, Skúli Sverrisson (Seria)
- 2011 – Hodeien azpian, Ruper Ordorika (Elkar)
- 2011 – Heart's Reflections, Wadada Leo Smith (Cuneiform)
- 2012 – White Mountain, Úlfur (Western Vinyl)
- 2012 – The Box Tree, Skúli Sverrisson & Óskar Guðjónsson (Mengi)
- 2013 – Antiheroes, Jim Black's AlasNoAxis (Winter & Winter)
- 2014 – They Hold It for Certain..., Skúli Sverrisson, Yungchen Lhamo & Anthony Burr (Mengi Records)
- 2015 – Intervals, Einar Scheving (Valrún)
- 2016 – Saumur, Arve Henriksen, Skúli Sverrisson & Hilmar Jensson (Mengi Records)
- 2018 – Strata, Skúli Sverrisson, Bill Frisell (Newvelle Records)
