= Cuong Vu =

Vietnamese-American jazz trumpeter (born 1969)

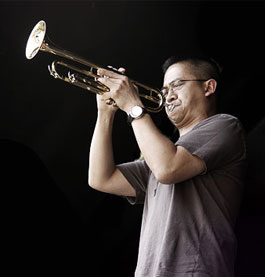
- Vu in 2014

Background information
- Born: September 19, 1969 (age 57); Saigon, South Vietnam
- Genre: Jazz
- Occupation: Musician
- Instrument: Trumpet
- Years active: 1994–present
- Labels: Avant, Knitting Factory, Origin, Cuneiform, Nonesuch
- Formerly of: Pat Metheny Group; Orange Then Blue
- Website: www.cuongvu.com

Cuong Vu (Vietnamese: Cường Vũ; born 19 September 1969) is a Vietnamese-American jazz trumpeter. In addition to his own work as a bandleader, Vu was a member of the Pat Metheny Group. He is the first American person of Vietnamese descent to win a Grammy Award. He won the Best Contemporary Jazz Album award twice through his work with the band. He is currently associate professor and chair of jazz studies at the University of Washington.

== Biography ==
Born in Saigon on September 19, 1969, Vu immigrated to Seattle with his family when he was six. At 11, he began to play the trumpet. He received a scholarship from the New England Conservatory of Music.

After graduation, Vu moved to New York City in 1994 and formed the group Ragged Jack with Jamie Saft, Andrew D'Angelo, and Jim Black. Vu has worked with Laurie Anderson, David Bowie, Dave Douglas, Myra Melford, Gerry Hemingway, and Mitchell Froom.

While a member of the Pat Metheny Group, Vu won two Grammy Awards for Best Contemporary Jazz Album: Speaking of Now, The Way Up; and one nomination for Best Pop Instrumental Performance for the song "As It Is." He worked with Metheny mainly as a trumpeter, but also contributed vocals, guitar and various small percussion.

Vu's trio consists of bassist Stomu Takeishi and drummer Ted Poor. He also serves as chair and professor in the jazz studies department of the University of Washington's School of Music.

In 2018, Vu returned to Vietnam to perform his series of concerts Jazz Through Time in Ho Chi Minh City.

== Discography ==
=== As leader ===
- Ragged Jack (Avant, 1997)
- Bound (Omnitone, 2000)
- Pure (Knitting Factory, 2000)
- Come Play with Me (Knitting Factory, 2001)
- It's Mostly Residual (ArtistShare/EMI, 2005)
- Vu-Tet (ArtistShare, 2007)
- Leaps of Faith (Origin, 2011)
- Holy Abyss (Cuneiform / E1, 2012)
- Cuong Vu Trio Meets Pat Metheny (Nonesuch, 2016)
- Ballet (The Music of Michael Gibbs) (RareNoiseRecords, 2017)
- Change In The Air (RareNoiseRecords, 2018)

=== As sideman ===
- 1993 – While You Were Out – Orange Then Blue
- 1996 – Too Close to the Pole – Bobby Previte
- 1997 – Sanctuary – Dave Douglas
- 1997 – Interpretations of Lessness – Andy Laster
- 1997 – Other Pocket – Jeff Song
- 1997 – Rules of Engagement – Jeff Song
- 1997 – Yeah/No – Chris Speed
- 1999 – Chamber Works – Gerry Hemingway
- 1999 – Deviantics – Chris Speed
- 1999 – Hold the Elevator: Live in Europe & Other Haunts – Orange Then Blue
- 2000 – Emit – Chris Speed
- 2000 – Luciano's Dream – Oscar Noriega
- 2000 – The Hollow World – Assif Tsahar & the Brass Reeds Ensemble
- 2001 – "Your Turn to Drive" – David Bowie (single)
- 2001 – Life on a String – Laurie Anderson
- 2002 – Speaking of Now – Pat Metheny Group
- 2002 – Window Silver Bright – Andy Laster
- 2003 – Speaking of Now (DVD) – Pat Metheny Group
- 2004 – Transition Sonic – Matthias Lupri
- 2004 – Where the Two Worlds Touch – Myra Melford
- 2005 – The Way Up – Pat Metheny Group
- 2005 – Swell Henry – Chris Speed
- 2006 – Grill Music – Jesper Løvdal
- 2006 – The Image of Your Body – Myra Melford
- 2006 – The Way Up (DVD) – Pat Metheny Group
- 2008 – Coziness Kills – Jesper Løvdal
- 2008 – Incendio – Los Dorados
- 2009 – The Whole Tree Gone – Myra Melford
- 2010 – Closer – Wasabi Trio meet Cuong Vu
- 2010 – Gagarin – Mickey Finn + Cuong Vu
- 2010 – Speak
- 2014 – Alastor: Book of Angels Volume 21 – Eyvind Kang
- 2019 – Overseas – Nguyên Lê

== Awards ==
Year	Nominees	Category	Nominated for	Result
2003	Cuong Vu (As a member of Pat Metheny Group)	Best Pop Instrumental Performance	"As It Is"	Nominated
2003	Cuong Vu (As a member of Pat Metheny Group)	Best Contemporary Jazz Album	Speaking of Now	Won
2005	Cuong Vu (As a member of Pat Metheny Group)	Best Contemporary Jazz Album	The Way Up	Won

== See also ==
- Asian Americans in arts and entertainment
- List of Grammy Award winners and nominees by country
