= John Hollenbeck (musician) =

American drummer

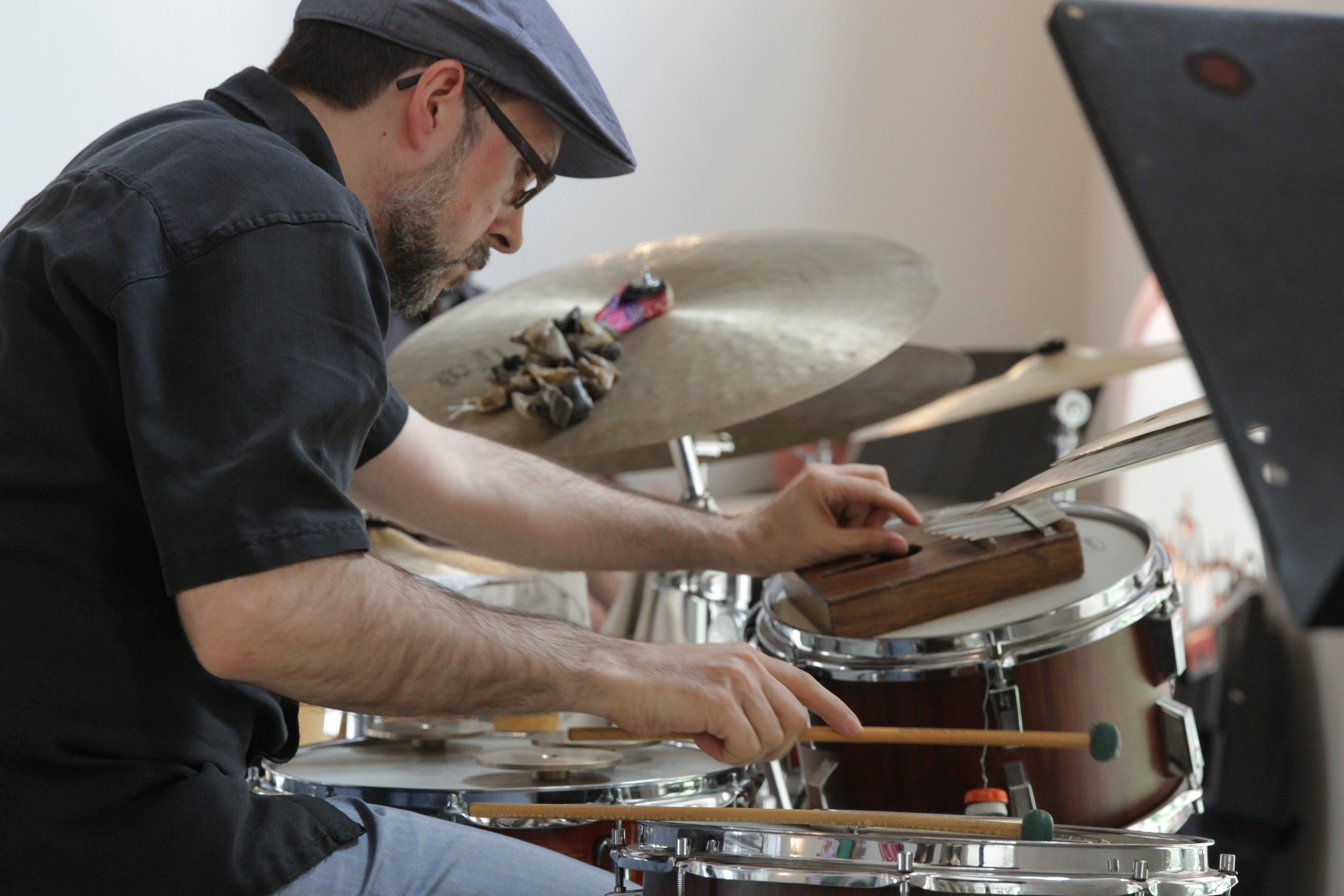
- John Hollenbeck at Festival Tonspuren Irsee 2014, Germany

Background information
- Born: June 19, 1968 (age 58); Binghamton, New York, U.S.
- Genre: Jazz
- Occupation: Musician
- Instrument: Drums
- Years active: 1992–present
- Labels: Cuneiform, Intuition, Omnitone, Sunnyside, ECM, Winter & Winter
- Website: www.johnhollenbeck.com

John Hollenbeck is an American-Canadian composer, drummer, and educator associated with jazz and contemporary classical music. He is the founder of the Claudia Quintet and leader of the John Hollenbeck Large Ensemble.

His work has been reviewed in The New York Times and other publications.

Critics have described his music as combining jazz composition with chamber ensemble instrumentation and structured improvisation. His large ensemble recordings A Blessing, eternal interlude, and All Can Work received Grammy Award nominations.

== Early life and education ==
Hollenbeck studied percussion and jazz composition at the Eastman School of Music.

== Career ==
Hollenbeck began leading ensembles in 2001 with the recordings Quartet Lucy, Static Still (with vocalist Theo Bleckmann), and no images.

He founded the Claudia Quintet, which has released albums including Royal Toast (2009) and What Is the Beautiful? (2011).

Hollenbeck also directs the John Hollenbeck Large Ensemble, whose recordings A Blessing (2005), eternal interlude (2008), and All Can Work (2018) were nominated for Grammy Awards.

His compositions have been recorded by the Orchestre National de Jazz of France, including on the album Shut Up and Dance (2011).

== Musical style ==
In addition to jazz ensembles, Hollenbeck has composed works for wind ensemble, choir, chamber ensembles, and interdisciplinary performance. He has also written percussion scores for works by composer and choreographer Meredith Monk.

== Teaching ==
Hollenbeck taught at the Jazz Institute Berlin from 2005 to 2016 and joined the Schulich School of Music at McGill University in 2015.

== Awards and honors ==
Hollenbeck has received multiple Grammy Award nominations and honors including the Doris Duke Performing Artist Award, the ASCAP Jazz Vanguard Award, and a Guggenheim Fellowship.

== Discography ==
=== As leader ===
- Static Still with Theo Bleckmann (GPE, 2000)
- No Images (CRI, 2001)
- Quartet Lucy (CRI, 2002)
- Joys & Desires (Intuition, 2005)
- A Blessing (Omnitone, 2005)
- Rainbow Jimmies (GPE, 2008)
- Eternal Interlude (Sunnyside, 2009)
- Songs I Like a Lot (Sunnyside, 2013)
- Songs We Like a Lot (Sunnyside, 2015)
- All Can Work (New Amsterdam, 2018)
- Songs You Like a Lot (Flexatonic, 2020)
- Letters to George (Flexatonic, 2023)

=== With the Claudia Quintet ===
- John Hollenbeck/The Claudia Quintet (CRI, 2001)
- I, Claudia (Cuneiform, 2004)
- Semi-Formal (Cuneiform, 2005)
- For (Cuneiform, 2007)
- Royal Toast (Cuneiform, 2010)
- What Is the Beautiful? (Cuneiform, 2011)
- September (Cuneiform, 2013)
- Super Petite (Cuneiform, 2016)
- Evidence-Based (Flexatonic, 2021)

=== As composer (selected recordings) ===
- Shut Up and Dance — Orchestre National de Jazz (Bee Jazz, 2011)
- Impermanence — Meredith Monk (ECM, 2008)
- The Cloud of Unknowing — Bamberg Symphony Chorus (2001)
- Demütig Bitten — Windsbacher Knabenchor (2004)
- Modern Tales — Brussels Vocal Project (2020)

=== As guest / sideman (selected) ===
- Bob Brookmeyer & Kenny Wheeler — Island (Artists House, 2003)
- Meredith Monk — Songs of Ascension (ECM, 2011)
- Meredith Monk — On Behalf of Nature (ECM, 2016)
- Theo Bleckmann — Hello Earth! The Music of Kate Bush (2011)
- Anna Webber — Binary (2016)
