= Holiday for Strings =

Holiday for Strings may refer to:

- "Holiday for Strings" (song), a song by David Rose
- Holiday for Strings (album), a 2002 album by Paul Motian and the Electric Bebop Band
