= Jakob Bro =

Danish guitarist and composer

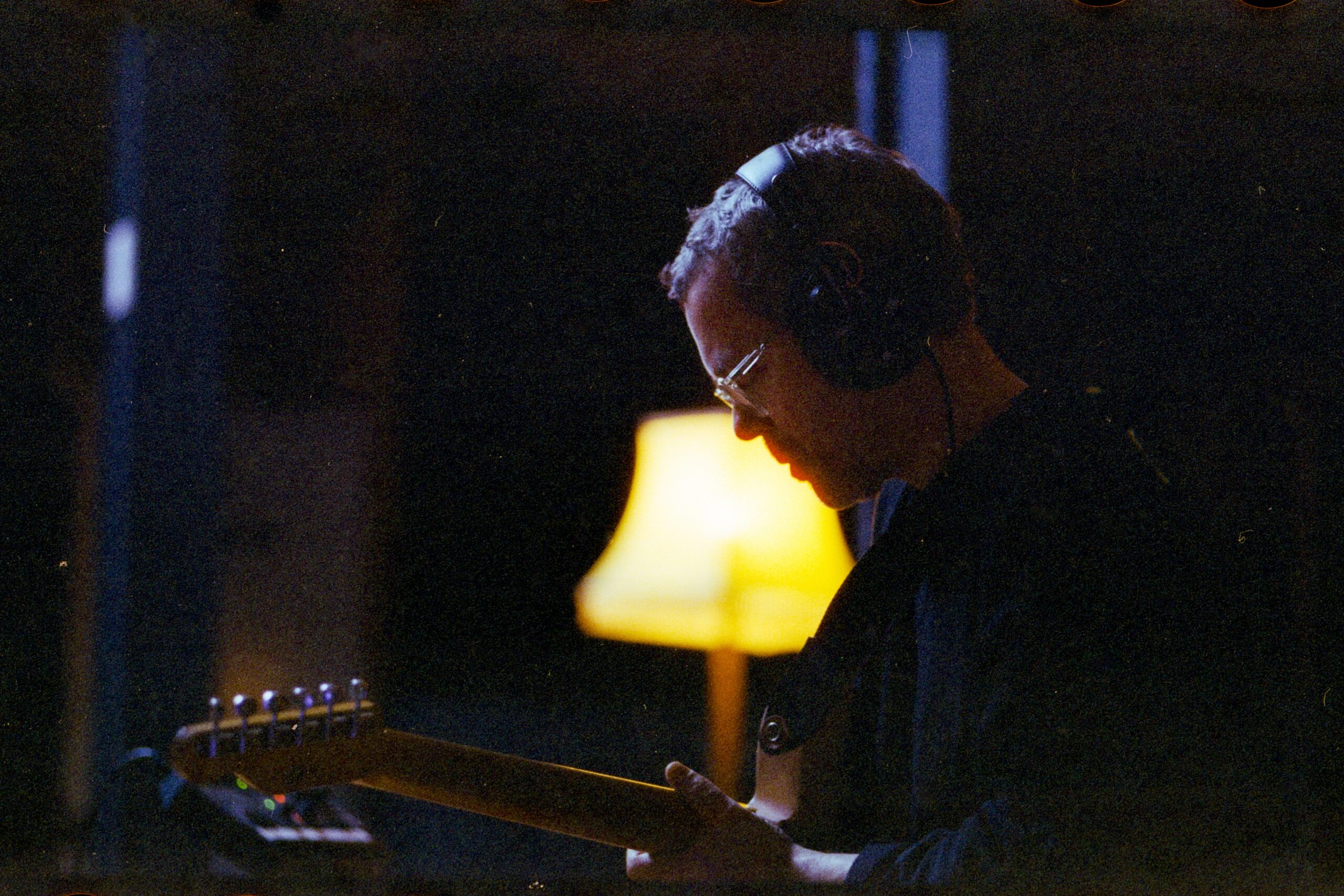
- Jakob Bro

Background information
- Born: April 11, 1978 (age 47); Denmark
- Genres: Jazz, Free improvisation, Contemporary Music, Film Music
- Occupations: Musician, Composer
- Instrument: Guitar
- Labels: ECM, Loveland Music
- Member of: Jakob Bro Trio feat. Thomas Morgan & Joey Baron, Palle Mikkelborg, Marilyn Mazur, Jakob Bro / AC / Brian Blade, Once Around The Room with Joe Lovano, Jakob Bro / Óskar Guðjónsson / Skúli Sverrisson
- Formerly of: Paul Motian and the Electric Bebop Band, Tomasz Stańko, Charles Lloyd Sky Trio, I Got You On Tape, BRO/KNAK
- Website: www.jakobbro.com

Jakob Bro (born April 11, 1978) is a Danish guitarist and composer.

He has released 20 albums as a bandleader and became a renowned artist on the international jazz scene after recording and touring with Paul Motian, Tomasz Stanko, Lee Konitz, Joe Lovano, Midori Takada, Brian Blade, and Charles Lloyd.

Jakob Bro was nominated for the Nordic Council Music Prize in 2014 for his trilogy Balladeering, Time and December Song. In 2016, he signed with ECM Records. His annual stint as a leader at The Village Vanguard began in 2020.

== Career ==
Jakob Bro currently leads a trio with Joey Baron and Thomas Morgan. Bro also works with Palle Mikkelborg, Charles Lloyd, Ambrose Akinmusire, Midori Takada, Joe Lovano, Mark Turner, Brian Blade, and Bro/Knak, a collaboration with the Danish producer Thomas Knak.

His album, "Taking Turns", with Lee Konitz, Bill Frisell, Jason Moran, and Andrew Cyrille was featured as the album of the month in The Guardian.

Bro is a former member of the Paul Motian Band (Garden of Eden, ECM, 2006) and a member of Tomasz Stanko's Dark Eyes Quintet (Dark Eyes, ECM, 2009).

Jakob Bro’s music and various ensembles are depicted in the film “Music for Black Pigeons” (directed by Jørgen Leth and Andreas Koefoed), which premiered at the 79th Venice Biennale and has been featured at film festivals around the world. The soundtrack was released in 2024.

Bro has worked with Paul Bley, Chris Cheek, Andrew D'Angelo, Bill Frisell, George Garzone, Lee Konitz, Thomas Morgan, Paul Motian, Oscar Noriega, Kurt Rosenwinkel, Chris Speed, Ben Street, Mark Turner, David Virelles, and Kenny Wheeler.

== Awards and honors ==
Jakob Bro was rewarded by the Danish Arts Foundation in 2006 and 2012 for his recordings Pearl River and Bro/Knak.

In 2009 and 2013, he received The Jazz Special Prize for Danish Jazz Album of the Year (for the albums Balladeering and December Song) and in 2013 he received The Jazznyt Prize founded by Niels Overgaard (for December Song).

In 2013 and 2016, Bro received the Carl Prize Jazz Composer of the Year for the albums Gefion and Bro/Knak. From 2003–2016, he received six Danish Music Awards: three for Danish Jazz Album of the Year (Gefion, Balladeering and Sidetracked), two for Danish Crossover Album of the Year (Bro/Knak and Sidetracked) and one for New Danish Jazz Artist of the Year (for the album Beautiful Day). In 2024, Jakob Bro was nominated for Danish Music Award – Jazz Composer of the Year (for Music For Black Pigeons).

He was nominated for the Nordic Council Music Prize in 2014 for his trilogy Balladeering, Time and December Song.

In 2018, he won the "Rising Star" as a guitarist in DownBeat Magazine's International Critics Poll

In 2012, he received the DJBFA honorary award, and in 2023 he received an honorary award from Danish Artist Association.

== Discography ==
=== As leader ===
- Daydreamer (Loveland, 2003)
- Sidetracked (Loveland, 2005)
- Pearl River (Loveland, 2007)
- The Stars Are All New Songs (Loveland, 2008)
- White Rainbow (Loveland, 2008)
- Who Said Gay Paree (Loveland, 2008)
- Balladeering (Loveland, 2009)
- Time (Loveland, 2011)
- Bro/Knak (Loveland, 2012)
- December Song (Loveland, 2013)
- Gefion (ECM, 2015)
- Hymnotic/Salmodisk (Loveland, 2015)
- Streams (ECM, 2016)
- Bay of Rainbows (ECM, 2018)
- Returnings (ECM, 2018)
- Uma Elmo (ECM, 2021)
- Once Around the Room: A Tribute to Paul Motian - Co-Leader with Joe Lovano (ECM, 2022)
- Strands with Palle Mikkelborg, Marilyn Mazur (ECM, 2023)
- Music For Black Pigeons - Motion Picture Soundtrack (Loveland Music, 2024)
- Taking Turns with Lee Konitz, Bill Frisell, Jason Moran, Thomas Morgan, Andrew Cyrille (ECM, 2024)
- Murasaki with Wadada Leo Smith and Marcus Gilmore (Loveland, 2025)

=== As sideman ===
- Bandapart, Visions Du Lamarck (Blackout)
- Beautiful Day, Copenhagen Melodrama (Eight Islands, 2022)
- Steffen Brandt, Baby Blue (Alarm)
- Jakob Buchanan, I Land in the Green Land (Buchanan)
- Povl Dissing, That Lucky Old Sun (Stunt, 2010)
- I Got You On Tape, 2 (Auditorium)
- Søren Dahl Jeppesen, Route One (Dog Day, 2010)
- Niels Lyhne Løkkegaard, Vesper (Hiatus, 2012)
- Paul Motian, Garden of Eden (ECM, 2004)
- Nicolai Munch-Hansen, Wanna Do Right... (Loveland)
- August Rosenbaum, Heights (Hiatus)
- Tomasz Stańko, Dark Eyes (ECM, 2009)
- Teitur, The Singer (Arlo & Betty)
- Jonas Westergaard, Helgoland (Stunt)
