= Winter & Winter Records =

German record label

Winter & Winter
- Founded: 1995
- Founder: Stefan Winter
- Distributor: Allegro
- Genre: Various
- Country of origin: Germany
- Location: Munich
- Official website: winterandwinter.com

Winter & Winter is a record label in Munich, Germany that specializes in jazz, classical and improvised music. It was founded by Stefan Winter following the demise of his JMT Records label.

Since 1997 Winter & Winter has released records by Dave Douglas, Paul Motian, Jim Black, Fred Frith and Uri Caine and rereleased albums from the JMT catalogue, including recordings by Steve Coleman, Cassandra Wilson, Greg Osby, Django Bates, and Paul Motian.

== Discography ==
Year released	Catalogue No.	Artist	Title	Notes
1997	910 001	Paolo Beschi	Bach Cello Solo I, II, III	
1997	910 002	Gary Thomas	Found on Sordid Streets	
1997	910 003	Marc Ducret	Détail	
1997	910 004	Uri Caine	Urlicht / Primal Light	
1997	910 005	Big Satan	Big Satan	
1997	910 006	La Gaia Scienza	Schubert Trio I	
1997	910 008	Paul Motian	Sound of Love	
1997	910 009	Paul Motian	Flight of the Blue Jay	
1997	910 010	Various Artists	Monk to Bach	Featuring Paul Motian, the Ensemble of the Gran Caffé Lavena, Venezia, Big Satan, Uri Caine, Paolo Beschi, La Gaia Scienza, Marc Ducret and Gary Thomas
1997	910 011	Noches de Buenos Aires	¡Tango Vivo!	An AudioFilm
1997	910 012	Ernst Reijseger	Colla Parte	Subtitled Versioni per Violoncello Solo
1997	910 013	Uri Caine	Wagner e Venezia	
1998	910 014	Caffè Concerto Sulla Piazza San Marco	Venezia la Festa	An AudioFilm
1998	910 015	Dave Douglas	Charms of the Night Sky	
1997	910 016	Tethered Moon	First Meeting	Paul Motian, Masabumi Kikuchi and Gary Peacock
1998	910 017	La Gaia Scienza	Schubert Trio II	
1998	910 018	La Gaia Scienza	Schubert Trio I+II	Double CD compiling 910 006 and 910 017
1997	910 019	Noël Akchoté	Lust Corner	with Marc Ribot and Eugene Chadbourne
1997	910 020	Pfyffer und Tamboure an der Basler Fasnacht	Rä Dä Bäng	An AudioFilm
1998	910 021	Tenore de Orosei	Voches de Sardinna I: Amore Profundhu	
1998	910 022	Cuncodu de Orosei	Voches de Sardinna II: Miserere	
1998	910 023	Tenore e Cuncodu de Orosei	Voches de Sardinna	Double CD compilation of 910 021 and 910 022
1998	910 024	Konrad Ruhland	Carl Orff: Ante - Post	
1998	910 025	Tangata Rea	Tango alla Baila	
1999	910 026	Souvenirs de Paris	Au Bordel	An AudioFilm
1998	910 027	Paolo Beschi	Bach Cello Solo IV, V, VI	
1998	910 028	Paolo Beschi	Bach Cello Solo I - VI	Double CD compilation of 910 001 and 910 027
1998	910 029	Marianne Rônez	Mysterien Sonaten	
1999	910 030	Various Artists	Cuadernos de La Habana	Five CD Box Set AudioFilm of Havana Club life
1998	910 031	Teodoro Anzellotti	Satie	
1998	910 032	Paul Motian	Trio 2000 + One	
1998	910 033	Gary Thomas	Pariah's Pariah	
1998	910 034	Uri Caine	Blue Wail	
1998	910 035	Teodoro Anzellotti and Luk Vaes	Mauricio Kagel: Solowerke für Akkordeon und Klavier	
1998	910 036	Bell' Arte Salzburg and Paul Plunkett	Tromba Triumphans	
1999	910 037	Ernst Reijseger	Colla Voche	With Tenore de Orosei and Cuncordu de Orosei
1999	910 038	Uri Caine	The Sidewalks of New York: Tin Pan Alley	An AudioFilm
1998	910 039	Various Artists	Resurrection Part I: 2000-1600 Composed Music Works	
1998	910 040	Various Artists	Resurrection Part II: 20th Century Improvised Music Works	
1999	910 041	Various Artists	Zydeco Madness: Gaga for Ya-Ya	
1999	910 042	Dave Douglas	Songs for Wandering Souls	
1999	910 043	Barry Bermange	Composition 17: Opera Mundi	
1999	910 044	Fred Frith and Ensemble Modern	Traffic Continues	With Ikue Mori and Zeena Parkins
1999	910 045	Paul Motian and the EBBB	Play Monk and Powell	
1999	910 046	Uri Caine Ensemble	Gustav Mahler in Toblach	Double CD
1999	910 047	Marianne Rônez and Ernst Kubitschek	Johann Sebastian Bach: Sechs Sonaten für Violino und Cembalo	
1999	910 048	Tethered Moon	Chansons d’Édith Piaf	Masabumi Kikuchi, Gary Peacock & Paul Motian
2000	910 049	Uri Caine Ensemble	Love Fugue: Robert Schumann	With La Gaia Scienza
2000	910 050	Vittorio Ghielmi	Bagpipes from Hell	With Luca Pianca
2000	910 051	Fumio Yasuda	Kakyoku	With the European Art Orchestra and Ernst Reijseger
2000	910 052	La Gaia Scienza	Johannes Brahms: Op. 60, Op. 34	
2000	910 053	Quartetto Italiano di Viole de Gamba	Johano Sebastian Bach: Preludi ai Corali	
2000	910 054	Uri Caine Ensemble	The Goldberg Variations	Double CD
2001	910 055	Lorenzo Ghielmi	Tintinnabulum	Subtitled: "Organ works by Arvo Pärt and the music of the 16th century and the sound of bells"
2000	910 056	Stian Carstensen	Farmers Market	
2000	910 057	Noël Akchoté	Rien	
2000	910 058	Guy Klucevsek	Accordance	
2000	910 059	Ensemble Musikfabrik NRW	Mauricio Kagel: Playback Play	
2000	910 060	Amsterdam String Trio	Winter Theme	Maurice Horsthuis, Ernst Reijseger and Ernst Glerum
2000	910 061	Jim Black	AlasNoAxis	
2001	910 062	Teodoro Anzellotti	Domenico Scarlatti: Vivi Felice!	
2001	910 063	Paul Motian and the EBBB	Europe	
2001	910 064	Various Artists	El Último Paraíso	An AudioFilm of Havana
2001	910 065	Various Artists	Villa Medici	Featuring Paolo Beschi, Quartetto Italiano di Viole da Gamba, Teodoro Anzellotti, Guy Klucevsek, La Gaia Scienza, Amsterdam String Trio, Ernst Reijseger, Vittorio Ghielmi, Marianne Rônez and Uri Caine
2001	910 066	Alexander Schiffgen	Orient-Express: The Musical Travelogue	An AudioFilm
2003	910 067	Jürg Kienberger and Trio Farkas	Hotel Waldhaus	An AudioFilm
2001	910 068	Uri Caine	Bedrock 3	With Tim Lefebvre and Zach Danziger
2002	910 069	Paul Motian and the EBBB	Holiday for Strings	
2002	910 070	Lorenzo Ghielmi	Nikolaus Bruhns: Complete Organ Works	
2002	910 071	Fred Frith and Maybe Monday	Digital Wildlife	
2001	910 072	Fumio Yasuda	Im Zauber von Verdi: Charmed with Verdi	An AudioFilm: "The Story of Alexander Schiffgen at the Mountain Sanatorium"
2004	910 073	Jim Black	Habyor	
2002	910 074	Guy Klucevsek	The Heart of the Andes	
2001	910 075	Uri Caine	Solitaire	Solo piano
2002	910 076	Jim Black	Splay	
2002	910 077	Ernst Reijseger and Franco D'Andrea	I Love You So Much It Hurts	
2001	910 078	Bell' Arte Salzburg with Susanne Rydén	Seventeenth Century Christmas Eve	
2001	910 079	Uri Caine	Rio	An AudioFilm
2003	910 080	Teodoro Anzellotti	3 Compositions by John Cage	
2002	910 081	Fumio Yasuda	Schumann's Bar Music	
2004	910 082	Jim Black	Pachora - Astereotypical	With Chris Speed and Brad Shepik
2002	910 083	Vale Tango	Músicas de Noche	
2002	910 084	Trío Tesis	Ritmos de Cuba	
2004	910 085	Vittorio Ghielmi	Short Tales for a Viol	
2002	910 086	Uri Caine	Diabelli Variations	With Concerto Köln
2004	910 087	Stian Carstensen	Backwards into the Backwoods	
2003	910 088	Guy Klucevsek	Tales from the Cryptic	
2002	910 089	Teodoro Anzellotti	Leoš Janáček	
2002	910 090	Schönberg Ensemble / Rundfunkchor Berlin	Mauricio Kagel: Trio in drei Sätzen / Schwarzes Madrigal	
2003	910 091	Lorenzo Ghielmi	Anno 1630	With Enrico Onofri and Margret Köll
2003	910 092	Fred Frith	Rivers and Tides { Working with Time	Film score
2004	910 093	Tethered Moon	Experiencing Tosca	Masabumi Kikuchi, Gary Peacock and Paul Motian
2003	910 094	Ernst Reijseger	Janna	With Mola Sylla and Serigne C.M. Gueye
2003	910 095	Uri Caine	Gustav Mahler: Dark Flame	
2004	910 096	Marianne Rônez	Viola d'Amore	
2004	910 097	Teodoro Anzellotti	Matthias Pinscher	With the Arditti Quartet and Rohan de Saram
2004	910 098	Fumio Yasuda	Heavenly Blue	With Kammerorchester Basel and Teodoro Anzellotti
2003	910 099	Rundfunk-Sinfonieorchester Saarbrücken conducted by Mauricio Kagel	Tantz-Schul	With Margaret Chalker and Christoph Späth
2004	910 100	Trifon Trifonov	Bulgarian Wedding: Music of the Last Century	With Stanimaka
2003	910 101	Noël Akchoté	Cabaret Modern	An AudioFilm: A Night in the Magic Mirror Tent
2004	910 102	Uri Caine	Live at the Village Vanguard	
2005	910 103	Fred Frith	Eleventh Hour	With the Arditti Quartet, Uwe Dierksen and William Winant - Double CD
2005	910 104	Brave Old World	Dus Gezang Fin Geto Lodzh	
2004	910 105	Lorenzo Ghielmi	Uber Johann Sebastian Bachs Leben, Kunst und Kunstwerke	
2004	910 106	Guy Klucevsek	The Well-Tampered Accordion	
2005	910 107	Noël Akchoté	Der Kastanienball	An AudioFilm: The Fall of Lucrezia Borgia - Double CD
2004	910 108	Noël Akchoté	Sonny II	
2004	910 109	Schönberg Ensemble	Mauricio Kagel: Die Stücke der Windrose	
2004	910 110	Various Artists	Cuadernos de Mexico	An AudioFilm - Triple CD
2005	910 111	Various Artists	Metropolis Shanghai	An AudioFilm: Showboat to China
2005	910 112	Uri Caine	Shelf-Life	With Bedrock (Tim Lefebvre and Zach Danziger)
2005	910 113	La Gaia Scienza	Robert Schumann: Für Meine Clara	
2005	910 114	Lorenzo Ghielmi	Bach and the Romanticist	
2006	910 115	Various Artists	Hawai'i	An AudioFilm: Under the Rainbow
2006	910 116	Fumio Yasuda and Theo Bleckmann	Las Vegas Rhapsody	With the Kammerorchester Basel
2005	910 117	Teodoro Anzellotti	Manuel Hidalgo	With the WDR Sinfonieorchester Köln
2006	910 118	Georg Graewe, Ernst Reijseger and Gerry Hemingway	Continuum	
2006	910 119	Vittorio Ghielmi	Full of Colour	
2006	910 120	Jim Black	Dogs of Great Indifference	
2005	910 121	Prima Carezza	Salon Music at Schumann's Bar	An AudioFilm
2006	910 122	Salvador "El Negro" Ojeda and al Golpe del Guatimé	The Roses	An AudioFilm: Dedicated to the Memory of Concha Michel and Tina Modotti
2006	910 123	Osvaldo Montes and Aníbal Arias	Tango para todo el Mundo	
2007	910 124	Teodoro Anzellotti	Chanson Discrète	
2006	910 125	Paul Motian	On Broadway Vol. 4 or The Paradox of Continuity	
2006	910 126	Schönberg Ensemble	Mauricio Kagel: Quirinus' Liebeskuss	With the Nederlands Kamerkoor
2006	910 127	Ernst Reijseger	Requiem for a Dying Planet	Sounds for the Films by Werner Herzog: The Wild Blue Yonder & The White Diamond
2006	910 128	Mauricio Kagel	The Mauricio Kagel Edition	Double CD and DVD
2007	910 129	Noël Akchoté	So Lucky	
2006	910 130	Uri Caine	Uri Caine Ensemble Plays Mozart	
2007	910 131	Guy Klucevsek and Alan Bern	Notefalls	
2007	910 132	Schönberg Ensemble	Im Wunderschönen Monat Mai	With Barbara Sukowa and Reinbert de Leeuw
2007	910 133	Paul Motian	Live at the Village Vanguard	
2008	910 134	Vittorio Ghielmi	Henry Purcell	With Il Suonar Parlante
2008	910 135	Uri Caine Ensemble	The Othello Syndrome	
2007	910 136	Ernst Reijseger	Do You Still	With Larissa Groeneveld and Frank van de Laar
2007	910 137	Theo Bleckmann and Fumio Yasuda	Berlin: Songs of Love and War, Peace and Exile	
2007	910 139	Lara Brothers	Parang: Caribbean Christmas with the Lara Brothers	
2008	910 140	Lorenzo Ghielmi and Vittorio Ghielmi	Carl Philipp Emanuel Bach: Gamba Sonatas & Fantasies	
2008	910 141	Hank Roberts	Green	With Marc Ducret and Jim Black
2008	910 142	George Kuo	O Ke Aumoe	
2008	910 143	Paul Motian	Live at the Village Vanguard Vol. II	
2008	910 144	Salvatore Sciarrino	Storie di Altre Storie	
2007	910 145	Uri Caine	The Classical Variations	
2008	910 146	Noël Akchoté	Toi-Même	
2008	910 147	Theo Bleckmann and Kneebody	Twelve Songs by Charles Ives	
2009	910 148	Paul Motian	On Broadway Volume 5	
2008	910 149	Refuge Trio	Refuge Trio	
2008	910 150	Nieuw Ensemble	Mauricio Kagel: Kantrimiusik	
2008	910 151	Ernst Reijseger	Tell Me Everything	
2009	910 152	Fumio Yasuda and Theo Bleckmann	Schumann's Favored Bar Songs	
2009	910 153	Vittorio Ghielmi, Lorenzo Ghielmi and Il Suonar Parlante	Johann Sebastian Bach: Die Kunst der Fuge	
2009	910 154	Jim Black and AlasNoAxis	Houseplant	
2009	910 155	Andrés Linetzky	Vale Tango Live at La Viruta	
2009	910 156	La Gaia Scienza	Haydn in London	
2009	910 157	Carlos Moscardini	Horizonte Infinito	
2010	910 158	Die Freitagsakademie	Travelogues of Italy	
2009	910 159	Hans Abrahamsen	Schnee	
2009	910 160	Aníbal Arias	Escenas de la Ciudad	
2009	910 161	Uri Caine	Plastic Temptation	With Bedrock (Tim Lefebvre and Zach Danziger)
2009	910 162	Forma Antiqva	Amore x Amore	
2010	910 163	Barbara Sukowa and The X-Patsys	Devouring Time	
2010	910 165	Kneebody	You Can Have Your Moment	
2009	910 166	Paul Motian	Bill Evans	Reissue of JMT 834 445
2010	910 167	Ernst Reijseger	Zembrocal Musical	With Groove Lélé
2010	910 168	Theo Bleckmann	I Dwell in Possibility	
2010	910 169	Ernst Reijseger	My Son, My Son, What Have Ye Done	
2010	910 170	Teodoro Anzellotti	The Goldberg Variations	
2010	910 171	Uri Caine	Twelve Caprices	With the Arditti String Quartet
2010	910 172	Paul Motian	Live at the Village Vanguard Vol. III	
2010	910 173	Forma Antiqva	Concerto Zapico	
2010	910 174	Hank Roberts	Everything Is Alive	With Bill Frisell, Jerome Harris and Kenny Wollesen
2011	910 175	Stefan Zeniuk	Gato Loco	
2011	910 176	Aarón Zapico	Phantasia	
2011	910 177	Uri Caine Trio	Siren	With Ben Perowsky and John Hébert
2011	910 178	Arditti String Quartet with Teodoro Anzellotti and Nicolas Hodges	Wolfgang Rihm: Fetzen	
2010	910 179	Paul Motian	On Broadway Volume 1	Reissue of JMT 834 430
2011	910 180	Paul Motian	On Broadway Volume 2	Reissue of JMT 834 440
2011	910 181	Ernst Reijseger	Cave of Forgotten Dreams	Music for the Werner Herzog film Cave of Forgotten Dreams
2011	910 182	Paul Motian	The Windmills of your Mind	With Bill Frisell, Thomas Morgan and Petra Haden
2011	910 183	Theo Bleckmann	Hello Earth!: The Music of Kate Bush	
2011	910 184	Jim Black	Somatic	
2012	910 185	Forma Antiqva	The Four Seasons	With Uri Caine and Theo Bleckmann
Various Artists	910 186	El Triángulo del Flamenco	An AudioFilm - Double CD	
2011	910 187	John McLaughlin Trio	Live at the Royal Festival Hall	Reissue of JMT 834 436
2012	910 188	Fabio Nieder	Der Bilderfresser	
2011	910 189	Windsbacher Knabenchor	Weihnachtsoratorium	Double CD
2011	910 190	Uri Caine	The Drummer Boy	Compilation of tracks from 910 004, 910 046 and 910 095
2012	910 191	Mauricio Kagel	Chorbuch, Les Inventions d'Adolphe Sax	With the Nederlands Kamerkoor and the Raschèr Saxophone Quartet
2013	910 192	Various Artists	Uchin: Sounds of Okinawa Island	An AudioFilm
2012	910 193	Andrés Linetzky and Vale Tango	Las Huellas en el Mar	
2012	910 194	Die Freitagsakademie	The Celebration: Bach – The Brandenburg Concertos	Double CD
2013	910 195	Fumio Yasuda and Theo Bleckmann	Mother Goose's Melodies	
2012	910 196	Andrés Linetzky	Diaspora in Buenos Aires	
2013	910 197	Ernst Reijseger	Down Deep	With Harmen Fraanje and Mola Sylla
2012	910 198	Paul Motian	Monk in Motian	Reissue of JMT 834 421
2012	910 199	Cassandra Wilson	Blue Skies	Reissue of JMT 834 419
2012	910 200	Paul Motian	On Broadway Vol. 1,2,3,4,5	Five CD Box Set compiling JMT 834 430, JMT 834 440, JMT 849 157, 910 125 and 910 148
2012	910 201	Various Artists	Baroque Music in the 21st Century	
2013	910 202	Jim Black and AlasNoAxis	Antiheroes	
2013	910 203	Hans Abrahamsen	Walden/Wald	With the Calefax Reed Quintet and Asko Schönberg Ensemble
2013	910 204	Fumio Yasuda	On the Path of Death and Life	
2013	910 205	Uri Caine	Rhapsody in Blue	
2013	910 206	Forma Antiqva	Opera Zapico	
2013	910 207	Paul Motian	On Broadway Volume 3	Reissue of JMT 849 157
2013	910 208	Stefano Gervasoni	Dir - in Dir	
2014	910 209	Fumio Yasuda	Fractured Silence	
2014	910 210	Uri Caine	Callithump	
2013	910 211	Stefan Zeniuk and Gato Loc	The Enchanted Messa	
2014	910 212	Teodoro Anzellotti	Hungarian Diary	
2014	910 213	Jim Black Trio	Actuality	With Elias Stemeseder and Thomas Morgan
2014	910 214	Ernst Reijseger	Crystal Palace	
2014	910 215			
2014	910 216			
2014	910 217	Bernhard Lang	The Anatomy of Disaster (Monadologie IX)	With the Arditti String Quartet
2014	910 218			
2014	910 219			
2014	910 220	Ernst Reijseger	Feature	

== See also ==
- List of record labels
