= Requiem for a Dying Planet =

Soundtrack album by Ernst Reijseger
- Released: 14 November 2006
- Recorded: 12 & 13 June 2004, 10 October 2004 and 12 March 2006; Yellow Cab Studios, Paris, France, Bauer Studios Ludwigsburg, and Fluxx Tonstudio, Munich, Germany
- Genre: Improvised music, world music
- Length: 77:39
- Label: Winter & Winter 910 127
- Producer: Stefan Winter

Ernst Reijseger chronology
Continuum (2006)	Requiem for a Dying Planet (2006)	Do You Still (2007)

Requiem for a Dying Planet (subtitled Sounds for Two Films by Werner Herzog) is an album by cellist Ernst Reijseger featuring music for Werner Herzog's 2004 documentary The White Diamond and 2005 film The Wild Blue Yonder performed with vocalist/poet/performer Mola Sylla and the Voches de Sardinna. The original tracks were recorded in 2004 in France and Germany and additional recording undertaken in Germany in 2006 before the album was released on the Winter & Winter label.

== Reception ==
Professional ratings
Review scores
Source	Rating
AllAboutJazz	5/5 stars
AllAboutJazz	3/5 stars
The Penguin Guide to Jazz Recordings	3/4 stars

In his review for Allmusic, Dave Shim said "Combining Reijseger’s formidable skills in the grey regions between jazz, improvised, and chamber music, with the mesmerizing vocal talents of Senegalese singer Mola Sylla and Sardinian vocal choir Voches de Sardinna, the album covers an extraordinarily wide range of moods and textures, from vaguely liturgical atmospheres to threatening drones to delicate percussive vignettes—eliciting a mysterious aura contemplative of planet Earth’s hereafter". On AllAboutJazz C. Michael Bailey rated the album five stars and observed "Requiem for a Dying Planet is hypnotic in its beauty and stunning in its scope. Ernst Reijseger meets Herzog as an equal on the creative field, and together they produce a super-composition. This moody music is perfect as a film soundtrack. It stimulates consideration and transcends the art of music into another realm". On the same site Glenn Astarita gave the album 3 stars stating "If you're in need of a spiritual or life-lifting boost, you might want to rethink or perhaps defer spinning this disc. A haunting beauty shines forth from the music, but the music occasionally casts a dark shadow via the cellist's stark pizzicato choruses and the vocalists' ritualized chanting... Regardless of taste, preference or attitude, this is a curiously interesting progression of musical frameworks, setting forth notions of divine contemplation prior to a doomsday-like event."

== Track listing ==
All compositions by Ernst Reijseger except as indicated

1. "Intro Dank sei dir Gott" – 0:47
2. "Dank sei dir Gott" (Georg Friedrich Händel) – 4:19
3. "Longing for a Frozen Sky" – 2:08
4. "A Una Rosa" (Traditional) – 8:37
5. "Libera Me, Domine" (Traditional) – 7:14
6. "In Search of a Hospitable Place" – 5:26
7. "Sanctus" (Traditional) – 6:37
8. "Bad News from Outer Space" – 6:10
9. "Su Bolu 'e s'Astore" (Tonino Puddu) – 4:52
10. "Mura/Ballu Turturinu" (Traditional) – 6:01
11. "Song of the Desert" – 7:31
12. "Kyrie" (Traditional) – 5:45

== Personnel ==
- Ernst Reijseger – cello, voice
- Mola Sylla – vocals, mbira, xalam, lyrics in Wolof (tracks 4, 6, 7 & 9–12) and Manding (track 5)
- Emmi Leisner – vocals (contralto)
- Patrizio Mura – vocals (voche)
- Massimo Roych, Piero Pala – vocals (voche, mesuvoche)
- Gianluca Frau – vocals (cronta)
- Mario Siotto – vocals (bassu)
