= The Stars Are All New Songs =

Studio album by Jakob Bro
- Released: 2008
- Genre: Jazz
- Label: Loveland
- Producer: Jakob Bro

Jakob Bro chronology
One Kiss Too Many (2007)	The Stars Are All New Songs (2008)	Balladeering (2009)

Professional ratings
Review scores
Source	Rating
All About Jazz	(Positive/Favorable)

The Stars Are All New Songs is a studio album by Danish jazz guitarist Jakob Bro.

== Track listing ==
All tracks composed by Jakob Bro

1. "Sound Flower"
2. "Origin"
3. "The Boy From Saladan"
4. "Romantics"
5. "Duke Ellington Boulevard"
6. "Waltzing Trees"
7. "Reconstructing A Dream"
8. "Drumscapes"
9. "Eugeine"

== Line up ==
- Bill Frisell - Guitar
- Kurt Rosenwinkel - Guitar (7)
- Jakob Bro - Guitar
- Chris Cheek - Tenor Sax
- Mark Turner - Tenor Sax
- Jesper Zeuthen - Alto Sax
- Andrew D'Angelo - Bass Clarinet
- Ben Street - Bass
- Paul Motian - Drums
