= Excavation (Ben Monder album) =

Studio album by Ben Monder Trio
- Released: May 16, 2000
- Recorded: June 30, July 19 & 20, 1999
- Studio: The Clubhouse, Germantown, NY
- Genre: Jazz
- Length: 73:12
- Label: Arabesque; AJ-0148
- Producer: Ben Monder, Leonardo Bella

Ben Monder chronology
No Boat (1997)	Excavation (2000)	Oceana (2005)

Excavation is an album by guitarist Ben Monder which was recorded in 1999 and first released on the Arabesque label the following year. It was rereleased on Sunnyside Records in 2006.

== Reception ==
Professional ratings
Review scores
Source	Rating
AllMusic	4/5 stars
All About Jazz	5/5 stars
The Penguin Guide to Jazz Recordings	4/4 stars

The AllMusic review by David R. Adler stated "Guitarist Ben Monder packs this highly original album with a panoply of ideas. The dreamlike voice of Theo Bleckmann gives the music an almost medieval, spooky quality. The compositions couldn't be more modern, however. ... Excavation contains some of the most unique, invigorating music released during the year 2000".

On All About Jazz, Phil DiPietro said "Ben and crew literally unearth layer upon layer of harmonic invention from the tunes and progressions. ... The listener must therefore prepare the ears for some heavy, but certainly not burdensome, lifting as well ... All in all, another extremely strong release from an underrecognized, innovative harmonic master and his henchmen that, so fortunately for us all, calls out for the next".

In JazzTimes, Christopher Porter wrote "Guitarist Ben Monder possesses such prodigious technique that songs can run away from him as he restlessly crams in every chordal variation. And this is mostly a very good thing, especially on Excavation ... Excavation is well worth digging".

== Track listing ==
All compositions by Ben Monder except where noted

1. "Mistral" – 9:12
2. "Luteous Pangolin" – 5:50
3. "Ellenville" – 14:55
4. "Sunny Manitoba" – 4:40
5. "Hatchet Face" – 16:29
6. "Etching" – 6:35
7. "Windowpane" – 11:53
8. "You Are My Sunshine" (Jimmie Davis, Charles Mitchell) – 3:36

== Personnel ==
- Ben Monder – guitar
- Theo Bleckmann – voice
- Skuli Sverrisson – electric bass
- Jim Black – drums, percussion
