= Play Monk and Powell =

Studio album by Paul Motian and the Electric Bebop Band
- Released: 1999
- Recorded: November 28 & 29, 1998
- Genre: Jazz
- Length: 46:30
- Label: Winter & Winter
- Producer: Joe Ferla and Paul Motian

Paul Motian chronology
Trio 2000 + One (1997)	Play Monk and Powell (1999)	Europe (1999)

Play Monk and Powell is an album by Paul Motian and the Electric Bebop Band released on the German Winter & Winter label in 1999 and featuring performances of tunes by Thelonious Monk and Bud Powell. The album is the group's fourth release following the 1992 album Paul Motian and the Electric Bebop Band, the 1995 album Reincarnation of a Love Bird and the 1996 release Flight of the Blue Jay. The band includes saxophonists Chris Potter and Chris Cheek, guitarists Kurt Rosenwinkel and Steve Cardenas, and bass guitarist Steve Swallow.

== Reception ==
The AllMusic review by Steve Loewy stated: "The arrangements are entirely respectful of the compositions, although liberties are taken with tempo and harmony. The results are more than satisfactory, if somewhat conservative, with the solos passed about generously. Motian again reveals his ability to kick and burn, as well as play sensitively, reaffirming his place among the greatest jazz drummers".

Professional ratings
Review scores
Source	Rating
AllMusic	4.5/5 stars
The Penguin Guide to Jazz Recordings	4/4 stars

== Track listing ==
1. "We See" (Thelonious Monk) - 4:53
2. "I'll Keep Loving You" (Bud Powell) - 5:43
3. "Brilliant Corners" (Monk) - 7:50
4. "Rootie Tootie" (Monk) - 4:48
5. "Blue Pearl" (Powell) - 4:19
6. "Boo Boo's Birthday" (Monk) - 4:17
7. "Wail" (Powell) - 5:04
8. "San Francisco Holiday" (Monk) - 6:23
9. "Parisian Thoroughfare" (Powell) - 3:13

- Recorded at Avatar Studios in New York City on November 28 & 29, 1998

== Personnel ==
- Paul Motian - drums
- Chris Potter - alto saxophone
- Chris Cheek - tenor saxophone
- Steve Cardenas - electric guitar
- Kurt Rosenwinkel - electric guitar
- Steve Swallow - electric bass
