= Europe (Paul Motian album) =

Studio album by Paul Motian and the Electric Bebop Band
- Released: 2001
- Recorded: July 2–5, 2000
- Genre: Jazz
- Length: 41:25
- Label: Winter & Winter
- Producer: Carlos Albrecht and Paul Motian

Paul Motian chronology
Play Monk and Powell (1998)	Europe (2001)	Holiday for Strings (2002)

Europe is an album by Paul Motian and the Electric Bebop Band released on the German Winter & Winter label in 2000. The album is the group's fifth release, following Paul Motian and the Electric Bebop Band (1992), Reincarnation of a Love Bird (1995), Flight of the Blue Jay (1997) and Play Monk and Powell (1998). The band includes saxophonists Chris Cheek and Pietro Tonolo, guitarists Ben Monder and Steve Cardenas, and bass guitarist Anders Christensen.

== Reception ==
The Allmusic review by Alex Henderson awarded the album 3 stars, stating: "Europe is essentially a straight-ahead hard bop/post-bop date, and yet, it isn't necessarily an album that jazz purists will be comfortable with. That's because Motian doesn't stick to the type of all-acoustic format that purists expect... Europe is a solid effort that will please those who admire Motian's flexibility and open-mindedness".

Professional ratings
Review scores
Source	Rating
Allmusic	3/5 stars
The Penguin Guide to Jazz Recordings	3.5/4 stars
Tom Hull	B+

== Track listing ==
1. "Oska T." (Thelonious Monk) - 2:13
2. "Birdfeathers" (Charlie Parker) - 3:04
3. "Blue Midnight" (Paul Motian) - 7:03
4. "Introspection" (Monk) - 5:21
5. "New Moon" (Steve Cardenas) - 5:46
6. "Fiasco" (Motian) - 3:21
7. "Gallops Gallop" (Monk) - 3:56
8. "If You Could See Me Now" (Tadd Dameron, Carl Sigman) - 6:23
9. "2300 Skidoo" (Herbie Nichols) - 4:28
  - Recorded at Bauer Studios in Ludwigsburg, Germany, on July 2–5, 2000

== Personnel ==
- Paul Motian - drums
- Pietro Tonolo - tenor saxophone, soprano saxophone
- Chris Cheek - tenor saxophone
- Steve Cardenas - electric guitar
- Ben Monder - electric guitar
- Anders Christensen - electric bass
