= So Lucky =

So Lucky may refer to:

- So Lucky (Noël Akchoté album), 2007
- So Lucky (Renée Geyer album) or the title song, 1981
- "So Lucky" (song), by Zdob și Zdub, representing Moldova at Eurovision 2011

== See also ==
- "I Should Be So Lucky", a 1987 song by Kylie Minogue
