= Trio 2000 + One =

Studio album by Paul Motian
- Released: 5 June 1998
- Recorded: August 11 & 12, 1997
- Studio: Avatar, New York City
- Genre: Jazz
- Length: 41:17
- Label: Winter & Winter; 910 032
- Producer: Stefan F. Winter

Paul Motian chronology
Flight of the Blue Jay (1996)	Trio 2000 + One (1998)	Play Monk and Powell (1996)

Professional ratings
Review scores
Source	Rating
AllMusic	4/5 stars
Tom Hull	B+
The Penguin Guide to Jazz Recordings	3.5/4 stars

Trio 2000 + One is an album by the jazz drummer Paul Motian, released on the German Winter & Winter label. It features Motian with tenor saxophonist Chris Potter, pianist Masabumi Kikuchi, acoustic double bassist Larry Grenadier and bass guitarist Steve Swallow.

== Track listing ==
All compositions by Paul Motian except as indicated

1. "From Time to Time" - 4:50
2. "Dance" - 4:52
3. "One in Three" - 4:50
4. "Pas de Deux" (Chris Potter) - 7:03
5. "The Sunflower 5:21
6. "Bend over Backwards" (Steve Swallow) - 5:26
7. "Last Call" - 4:57
8. "Protoplasm" (Chris Potter) - 3:58
- Recorded at Avatar Studios in New York City on August 11 & 12, 1997

== Personnel ==
- Paul Motian - drums
- Chris Potter - tenor saxophone
- Masabumi Kikuchi - piano
- Steve Swallow - electric bass
- Larry Grenadier - double bass
