= Holiday for Strings (album) =

Studio album by Paul Motian and the Electric Bebop Band
- Released: 15 July 2002
- Recorded: November 10–12, 2001
- Genre: Jazz
- Length: 43:03
- Label: Winter & Winter
- Producer: Stefan Winter

Paul Motian chronology
Europe (1999)	Holiday for Strings (2002)	I Have the Room Above Her (2004)

Holiday for Strings is an album by Paul Motian and the Electric Bebop Band released on the German Winter & Winter label in 2002. The album is the group's sixth release. Like their previous album, the band consists of saxophonists Chris Cheek and Pietro Tonolo, guitarists Ben Monder and Steve Cardenas, and bass guitarist Anders Christensen.

== Reception ==
The Allmusic review by Glenn Astarita awarded the album 4 stars, stating, "the sextet provides its indelible touch of class to a series of generally moving works -- regardless of intensity... Passionately recommended".

Professional ratings
Review scores
Source	Rating
Allmusic	4/5 stars
The Penguin Guide to Jazz Recordings	3.5/4 stars
Tom Hull	B+

== Track listing ==
All compositions by Paul Motian except as indicated

1. "Arabesque" - 3:35
2. "5 Miles to Wrentham" - 4:06
3. "Morpion" - 5:05
4. "Luteous Pangolin" (Ben Monder) - 4:31
5. "Look to the Black Wall" - 3:36
6. "Holiday for Strings" (David Rose, Sam Gallop) - 5:31
7. "Endgame" - 3:44
8. "It Never Entered My Mind" (Lorenz Hart, Richard Rodgers) - 6:15
9. "Roundup" (Steve Cardenas) - 3:30
10. "Oh, What a Beautiful Mornin'" (Oscar Hammerstein II, Richard Rodgers) - 3:04

== Personnel ==
- Paul Motian - drums
- Pietro Tonolo - alto saxophone
- Chris Cheek - tenor saxophone
- Steve Cardenas - electric guitar
- Ben Monder - electric guitar
- Anders Christensen - electric bass
