= Dust (Ben Monder album) =

Studio album by Ben Monder Trio
- Released: 1997
- Recorded: December 11–12, 1996
- Studio: EastSide Sound, NYC
- Genre: Jazz
- Length: 59:20
- Label: Arabesque; AJ-0131
- Producer: Ben Monder, Yaniv Mor-Hamoy

Ben Monder chronology
Flux (1995)	Dust (1997)	Heyday (1998)

Dust is an album by guitarist Ben Monder which was recorded in 1996 and first released on the Arabesque label the following year. It was rereleased on Sunnyside Records in 2006.

== Reception ==
Professional ratings
Review scores
Source	Rating
AllMusic	2.5/5 stars
All About Jazz	2.5/5 stars
The Penguin Guide to Jazz Recordings	2.5/4 stars

Critical reception was mixed. The AllMusic review by Scott Yanow stated "This is a difficult set to warm up to. Guitarist Ben Monder's dry sound, which at times recalls Pat Martino and Bill Frisell without sounding derivative, is both subtle and versatile. ... Monder's playing ranges from introspective to rocking, and is adventurous while remaining tied to each piece's original mood. One certainly respects Monder's music, but it generally lacks much warmth or wit".

On All About Jazz, James Taylor said it "covers all the ground from free, ambient and discordant to tight, together and melodically upbeat" and noted "Trio records can go one of two ways: they either become a showcase for one particular player's overwhelming talent or a dynamic conversation between three equally talented and thematically in-tune musicians. Dust definitely falls in the latter category. This isn't Monder's show per se; all three players push and pull the songs in varying directions, following no real leader. While Monder's best work may be as a sideman, interested listeners may wish to check out Dust in order to see the artist in his early stages".

In JazzTimes, Bret Primack wrote "although he may not be a recognized name in the world of jazz just yet, other musicians certainly know about him. The man can play. Rather than an exhibition of his chops, he dazzles us with an exploration of the infinite possibilities of the guitar trio. Yet although this is clearly a jazz recording, it’s informed by the sum total of his musical experience in other idioms, including classical and rock".

== Track listing ==
All compositions by Ben Monder except where noted

1. "Sleep" – 8:08
2. "Silent Neighbors" – 6:09
3. "The Third Eyebrow" – 8:13
4. "Dust" – 10:58
5. "In Memoriam" – 6:40
6. "I'll Remember April" (Gene de Paul, Patricia Johnston, Don Raye) – 6:18
7. "Gemini" – 8:16
8. "Late Green" – 4:38

== Personnel ==
- Ben Monder – guitar
- Ben Street – double bass
- Jim Black – drums, percussion
