= Amorphae =

Studio album by Ben Monder
- Released: January 15, 2016
- Recorded: October 2010; December 2013
- Studio: Sear Sound, NYC; Brooklyn Recording, NYC
- Genre: Jazz
- Length: 44:50
- Label: ECM; ECM 2421
- Producer: Sun Chung

Ben Monder chronology
Hydra (2013)	Amorphae (2016)	Day After Day (2019)

Professional ratings
Review scores
Source	Rating
All About Jazz	4/5 stars
The Guardian	3/5 stars

Amorphae is a studio album by American jazz guitarist Ben Monder recorded in October 2010 and December 2013 and released on ECM in January 2016.

== Background ==
The first session featured drummer Paul Motian, who appears for a Rodgers and Hammerstein standard and a joint original—Motian died, however, before the duets album could be finished. Monder decided to continue the project in 2013, with a second sessions featuring Pete Rende on synthesizer and drummer Andrew Cyrille.

== Reception ==
In The Guardian, John Fordham gave this album three stars and says that "Playing unaccompanied on conventional and baritone guitars, Monder embraces soft tone poems of humming sustains and eerie echoes, as well as wilder David Torn-like tumults." and add that "His soundworld is a shade private and austere, but ECM’s blessing should alert a wider audience to Monder's talents."

Jazz Times' Thomas Conrad wrote:

The album sustains a single ethereal domain of sonorities, even though it was recorded in two sessions three years apart and uses four different combinations of players... It is remarkable how many layers of sound Monder can produce from one guitar and one vintage Lexicon reverb unit. Cyrille offers, selectively, brushstrokes of color. On two trio pieces with Cyrille and Pete Rende on synth, the sonic landscape becomes vast but the creative process remains profoundly gradual. In one respect only, Amorphae is typical of current jazz releases: The ratio of originals to standards is 7-to-1. “Oh, What a Beautiful Morning” is a duet with Paul Motian, in one of his final recordings. Motian's signature deft irregular accents create dramatic expectancy for the initial tentative forays of Monder, who grasps for fragments of the melody. Then Monder and his Lexicon blow this sweet song of Rodgers and Hammerstein into a wild, keening, howling storm. With more tracks like this one, Amorphae would have been a stronger and even stranger album.

== Track listing ==
No.	Title	Writer(s)	Date recorded	Length
1.	"Tendrils"	Monder	December 2013	5:21
2.	"Oh, What a Beautiful Morning"	Rodgers; Hammerstein	October 2010	5:22
3.	"Tumid Cenobite"	Cyrille; Monder	December 2013	4:49
4.	"Gamma Crucis"	Cyrille; Monder; Rende	December 2013	5:15
5.	"Zythum"	Cyrille; Monder; Rende	December 2013	7:06
6.	"Triffids"	Monder; Motian	October 2010	2:55
7.	"Hematophagy"	Cyrille; Monder	December 2013	6:57
8.	"Dinosaur Skies"	Monder	October 2010	7:05
Total length:				44:50

== Personnel ==
=== Musicians ===
==== October 2010 ====
- Ben Monder – electric guitar, electric baritone guitar
- Paul Motian – drums (except "Dinosaur Skies")

==== December 2013 ====
- Ben Monder – electric guitar, electric baritone guitar
- Pete Rende – synthesizer ("Gamma Crucis", "Zythum")
- Andrew Cyrille – drums (except "Tendrils")

=== Technical personnel ===
- Sun Chung – producer, liner photography
- Rick Kwan (October 2010) – mixing engineer, recording engineer
- James A. Farber (December 2013) – recording engineer
- Sascha Kleis – design
- Max Franosch – cover photography
- Jesse Chun – liner photography
