= Theater of Thought =

2022 documentary film

- Promotional release poster
- Directed by: Werner Herzog
- Written by: Werner Herzog
- Produced by: Ariel Leon Isacovitch
- Narrated by: Werner Herzog
- Cinematography: Luke Holwerda
- Edited by: Marco Capalbo
- Music by: Ernst Reijseger
- Production companies: Skellig Rock; Ventureland
- Release dates: September 2022 (Telluride Film Festival); December 13, 2024 (United States)
- Running time: 107 minutes
- Country: United States
- Language: English

Theater of Thought is a 2022 documentary film directed by Werner Herzog.

== Synopsis ==
The documentary focuses on progress in various fields of neurological science, including various types of brain–computer interfaces.

== Reception ==
In a positive review for The New York Times, reviewer Alissa Wilkinson wrote of the film, "We may not understand the brain any more after seeing it, but we're definitely tuned into the mystery."

In a positive review for Ars Technica, reviewer Jennifer Ouellette wrote, "For Herzog, making the documentary was about the journey and following the whims of his insatiable curiosity; he was less concerned about finding definitive answers. It's a wise approach, given how much we have to learn about how the physical mass of tissue that is the brain gives rise to complex human thought and consciousness."

Reviewer Allan Hunter of Screen Daily wrote, "Werner Herzog remains the man with a thousand questions. Theater Of Thought is propelled by his insatiable curiosity. A wide-ranging road trip through the workings of the human brain, it explores how current research could provide a breakthrough on a par with the unlocking of human DNA. Herzog's ability to balance intellectual rigour with quirky human touches ensures a documentary that is utterly fascinating, even if the average viewer's little grey cells might struggle to always keep up. The director's loyal fan base and far beyond will respond to this soulful feast of neural stimulation."

Reviewer Sheri Linden of The Hollywood Reporter wrote, "Having made a film on every continent, tireless searcher Werner Herzog keeps things stateside for Theater of Thought. Even so, he travels far, exploring one of the last great frontiers, the human brain, from a rich multitude of angles. The result is one of his most piercing inquiries yet."

In a review for Deadline.com, reviewer Todd McCarthy wrote, "Herzog's survey makes it clear that there's a lot going on in this field that will one day become contentious and concerning to a public currently oblivious to it. This is decidedly a talking-heads sort of film, but the talk and the heads are worth listening to and beholding."

Reviewer Clint Worthington of RogerEbert.com gave the film a rating of 2.5 out of 4 stars, writing, "while fits and spurts of 'Theater' seem illuminating, that same confusion about these big scientific and metaphysical questions also keep the doc from feeling all that fulfilling."

Reviewer Alex Broadwell of inreviewonline.com wrote, "While Theater of Thought leaves a lot of important stones unturned, and fails to reach the philosophical-poetic heights of Herzog's best, it does outline quite directly through conversation an immense wealth of knowledge, leaving a fertile ground for viewers to themselves find those short circuits, contradictions, and points of impenetrability."

Reviewer David Ehrlich of IndieWire gave the film a rating of B-, writing, "Despite its ostensible fixation on the frontiers of neuroscience and AI, this film is ultimately the work of an old poet who fears that he might be the last of his kind; it's the rallying cry of an artist who fears leaving behind a future so obsessed with understanding our brains that it doesn’t leave any room for imagination."

Reviewer Derek Smith of Slant Magazine wrote, "If Theater of Thought is somewhat hampered by its frequent use of talking-head interviews, its perspective on the current (and future) state of neural technology, and the blessings and curses that do, or may, come with it, is invigorated by Herzog’s persistently quixotic line of questioning. What could have been a dry run-through of an array of otherwise fascinating technological breakthroughs is instead rendered as an often strange and funny meditation on the boundless potentials of human thought, expression, and understanding."
