= Colla Voche =

Studio album by Ernst Reijseger
- Released: May 4, 1999
- Recorded: September 1–5, 1998; Cattedrale di San Pietro, Galtelli, Sardinia
- Genre: Improvised music, contemporary classical music
- Length: 57:39
- Label: Winter & Winter 910 037
- Producer: Stefan Winter

Ernst Reijseger chronology
Colla Parte (1997)	Colla Voche (1999)	I Love You So Much It Hurts (2002)

Colla Voche is an album by cellist Ernst Reijseger with the vocal group Tenore e Cuncordu de Orosei, recorded in 1998 in Sardinia and released on the Winter & Winter label.

== Reception ==
Professional ratings
Review scores
Source	Rating
Allmusic	3/5 stars
The Penguin Guide to Jazz Recordings	3.5/4 stars

In her review for Allmusic, Joslyn Layne said "The music flows back and forth between new and traditional material, but there is a consistent sound and calm atmosphere throughout... Although the musicians' respective solo albums are the best showcase of their talent, this is a lovely and worthwhile album".

== Track listing ==
All compositions by Ernst Reijseger except as indicated

1. "Libera Me, Domine" (Traditional) – 6:19
2. "Nanneddu Meu" (Peppino Mereu, Tonino Puddu) – 6:34
3. "Strabismo di Venere" – 6:53
4. "Armonica" (Traditional) – 4:38
5. "A Una Rosa (Voche 'e Notte Antica)" (Traditional) – 10:18
6. "Trumba" – 4:46
7. "Colla Voche" – 5:08
8. "Su Puddhu (Balla Turturinu)" (Traditional) – 5:34
9. "Su Bolu 'e S'Astore" (Tonino Puddu) – 3:30
10. "Dillu" (Traditional) – 3:59

== Personnel ==
- Ernst Reijseger – cello, vocals
- Patrizio Mura – vocals (voche), harmonica, Jew's harp
- Massimo Roych, Piero Pala – vocals (voche, mesuvoche)
- Gianluca Frau, Martino Corimbi – vocals (contra)
- Mario Siotto, Salvatore Dessena – vocals (bassu)
- Alan "Gunga" Purves – percussion
