= I Love You So Much It Hurts (album) =

Studio album by Ernst Reijseger and Franco D'Andrea
- Released: October 1, 2002
- Recorded: March 12 & 13, 2002; Bauer Studios, Ludwigsburg, Germany
- Genre: Improvised music, jazz
- Length: 55:28
- Label: Winter & Winter 910 077
- Producer: Stefan Winter

Ernst Reijseger chronology
Colla Voche (1999)	I Love You So Much It Hurts (2002)	Janna (2003)

I Love You So Much It Hurts is an album by the cellist Ernst Reijseger and the pianist Franco D'Andrea, recorded in 1997 and released on the Winter & Winter label.

== Reception ==
Professional ratings
Review scores
Source	Rating
AllMusic	4/5 stars
The Penguin Guide to Jazz Recordings	3.5/4 stars

In his review for AllMusic, Ken Dryden stated: "The pairing of avant-garde cellist Ernst Reijseger with post-bop pianist Franco D'Andrea provides anything but predictable music... Recommended".

== Track listing ==
All compositions by Franco D'Andre except as indicated

1. "In a Sentimental Mood" (Duke Ellington, Manny Kurtz, Irving Mills) - 2:56
2. "Night and Day" (Cole Porter) - 4:53
3. "Two Colours" - 5:35
4. "Ma l'Amore No" (Giovanni D'Anzi) - 8:58
5. "Afro Abstraction" - 9:13
6. "Hi There" (Sean Bergin) - 3:04
7. "Amore Baciami" (Carlo Alberto Rossi) - 4:12
8. "You Do Something to Me" (Porter) - 6:50
9. "Complex Eight" (Misha Mengelberg) - 6:18
10. "Reflections" (Thelonious Monk) - 1:51
11. "I Love You So Much It Hurts" (Floyd Tillman) - 1:38

== Personnel ==
- Ernst Reijseger - cello
- Franco D'Andrea - piano
