= Colla Parte =

Studio album by Ernst Reijseger
- Released: 1997
- Recorded: February 26–28 & March 1, 1997; Villa Medici-Giulini, Briosco, Italy
- Genre: Improvised music, contemporary classical music
- Length: 60:25
- Label: Winter & Winter 910 012
- Producer: Stefan Winter

Ernst Reijseger chronology
| Et on ne Parle pas du Temps (1995) | Colla Parte (1997) | Colla Voche (1999) |

Colla Parte (subtitled Versioni per Violoncello Solo) is a solo album by the cellist Ernst Reijseger, recorded in 1997 and released on the Winter & Winter label.

== Reception ==
Professional ratings
Review scores
| Source | Rating |
|---|---|
| AllMusic | 4.5/5 stars |
| The Penguin Guide to Jazz Recordings | 3/4 stars |

In her review for AllMusic, Joslyn Layne wrote: "Calm, meditative, and gorgeous, Colla Parte is a solo cello recording from Ernst Reijseger, a musician internationally recognized not only for technique, but for unmatched creativity and improvisatory skills. Warm, intimate sound and an informal atmosphere... Filled with beauty, this Winter & Winter release is highly recommended for all fans of string music in general, as well as for Reijseger fans specifically".

In JazzTimes, Bill Shoemaker observed: "On this often sumptuous and occasionally wry solo program, Reijseger combines prodigious classical training, a dash of subversive wit, and an open-hearted, if idiosyncratic brio, to make Colla Parte a thoroughly engaging album from beginning to end. Reijseger creates a seamless, cloistered calm from not just space-soaking pieces built upon devices perfected in previous centuries, but also borderline dadaist techniques and a wide range of materials".

== Track listing ==
All compositions by Ernst Reijseger except as indicated

1. "Colla Parte" - 7:24
2. "Ricercare" - 3:21
3. "Gwidza" (Dollar Brand) - 5:06
4. "Ritornello" - 3:26
5. "Garbato con Sordina" - 3:28
6. "Violoncello Bastardo" - 4:51
7. "Toccata" - 2:54
8. "Divertimento" - 3:31
9. "Giocoso" - 1:58
10. "Rosa" - 4:09
11. "Passaggio" - 3:33
12. "Cello di Buddha" - 7:28
13. "La Madre di Tutti le Guerre" (Misha Mengelberg) - 3:27

== Personnel ==
- Ernst Reijseger - cello
