= Ernst Reijseger =

Dutch cellist and composer

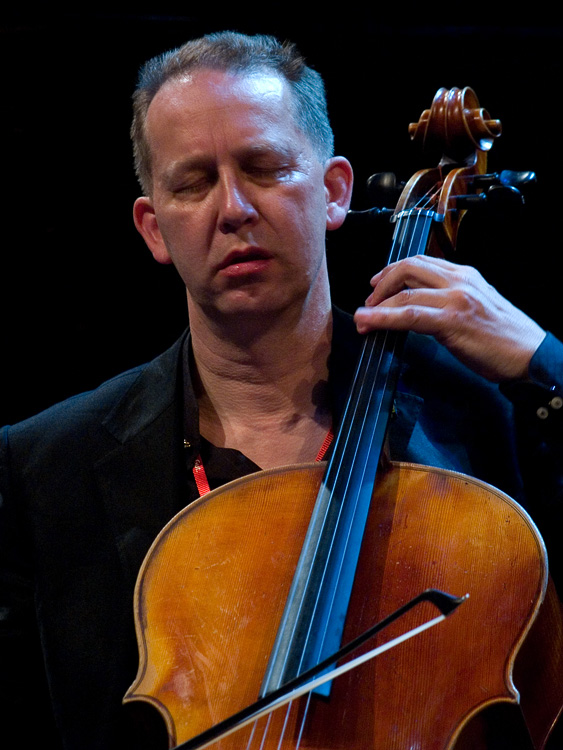
- Ernst Reijseger, Moers Festival 2007

Background information
- Born: 13 November 1954 (age 71); Bussum, Netherlands
- Genres: Jazz, Avant-garde jazz, free jazz, free improvisation contemporary classical ⋅
- Occupations: Musician, composer
- Instrument: Cello

Ernst Reijseger (born 13 November 1954) is a Dutch cellist and composer. He specializes in avant-garde jazz, free jazz, improvised music, and contemporary classical music and often gives solo concerts. He has worked with Louis Sclavis, Derek Bailey, Han Bennink, Misha Mengelberg, Gerry Hemingway, Yo-Yo Ma, Albert Mangelsdorff, Franco D'Andrea, Joëlle Léandre, Georg Gräwe, Trilok Gurtu, and Mola Sylla, and has done several world music projects working with musicians from Sardinia, Turkey, Iran, Senegal, and Argentina, as well as the Netherlands-based group Boi Akih.

He has made numerous recordings, both as solo cellist and with other groups, and has been the subject of a documentary film. He has also written several film scores, including scores for a number of Werner Herzog films.

== Film scores ==
- 2000 - Ajax: Hark the Herald Angel Sings
- 2004 - The White Diamond
- 2005 - The Wild Blue Yonder
- 2008 - The Unforbidden City
- 2009 - My Son, My Son, What Have Ye Done?
- 2010 - It's Already Summer
- 2010 - Cave of Forgotten Dreams
- 2013 - Mongools goud – Mongolian gold
- 2014 - Voor Emilia
- 2015 - Prejudice
- 2016 - Salt and Fire
- 2019 - Nomad: In the Footsteps of Bruce Chatwin
- 2019 - Family Romance, LLC
- 2020 - Fireball: Visitors from Darker Worlds
- 2022 - Theater of Thought
- 2025 - Ghost Elephants
- TBA - Bucking Fastard

== Quotes on... ==
"He is a magnificent cellist, and he can do anything, anything on his cello. He could play the civil war, the American Civil War on his cello." —Werner Herzog

== Solo and group work ==
Reijseger's most well known solo album is Colla Parte, which he recorded in a room of a small villa in which he was staying on a trip to Sardinia. This would be the same trip that he would meet the Voches De Sardinia, with whom he recorded Colla Voche.

He has done several recordings with Mola Sylla, including Requiem for a Dying Planet and Janna.

Reijseger is a member of the Amsterdam String Trio, with Ernst Glerum and Maurice Horsthuis, and another trio, simply called Graewe, Reijseger, Hemingway, with Georg Graewe and Gerry Hemingway.

He was also a member of the ICP Orchestra (or Instant Composers Pool) for many years, as well as the Clusone Trio with Michael Moore and Han Bennink.

== Discography ==
- Mistakes (Broken, 1979) with Sean Bergin
- Taiming (Hummeloord, 1981)
- Cellotape & Scotchtape (Data, 1982) with Alan "Gunga" Purves
- Dutch Masters (Soul Note, 1987) with Misha Mengelberg, Steve Lacy, George Lewis & Han Bennink
- Ta (Nimbus, 1987) with Alan "Gunga" Purves
- Sonic Fiction (Hat Art, 1989) with Georg Gräwe and Gerry Hemingway
- Noci...Strani Frutti (Leo, 1991) with Pino Minafra and Han Bennink
- Et on ne Parle pas du Temps (FMP, 1995) with Louis Sclavis
- Colla Parte (Winter & Winter, 1997)
- Colla Voche (Winter & Winter, 1999) with Tenore and Concordu de Orosei
- I Love You So Much It Hurts (Winter & Winter, 2002) with Franco D'Andrea
- Janna (Winter & Winter, 2003) with Mola Sylla and Serigne C.M. Gueye
- Continuum (Winter & Winter, 2006) with Georg Graewe and Gerry Hemingway
- Requiem for a Dying Planet (Winter & Winter, 2006) - soundtrack music for Werner Herzog's The White Diamond and The Wild Blue Yonder
- Do You Still (Winter & Winter, 2007)
- Tell Me Everything (Winter & Winter, 2009)
- Zembrocal Musical (Winter & Winter, 2010) with Groove Lélé
- My Son, My Son, What Have Ye Done (Winter & Winter, 2011)
- Cave of Forgotten Dreams (Winter & Winter, 2011) - soundtrack music for Werner Herzog's Cave of Forgotten Dreams
- Down Deep (Winter & Winter, 2013) - with Harmen Fraanje and Mola Sylla
- Feature (Winter & Winter, 2014)
- Count Till Zen (Winter & Winter, 2015) - with Harmen Fraanje and Mola Sylla
- The Volcano Symphony (Winter & Winter, 2016)
- We Were There (Just Listen, 2020) - with Harmen Fraanje and Mola Sylla

With the Amsterdam String Trio

- Winter Theme (Winter & Winter, 2000)

With the Arcado String Trio

- Green Dolphy Suite (Enja, 1995) with Trio de Clarinettes
- Live in Europe (Avant, 1996)

With the Uri Caine Ensemble

- The Goldberg Variations (Winter & Winter, 2000)

With Michael Moore

- An hour with... (Hat Hut, 2000)

With Samo Salamon

- Dream Suites Vol. 1 (Samo Records, 2025)
