= Time (Jakob Bro album) =

Studio album by Jakob Bro
- Released: 2011
- Genre: Jazz
- Length: 42:21
- Label: Loveland
- Producer: Jakob Bro

Jakob Bro chronology
Balladeering (2009)	Time (2011)	Bro/Knak (2012)

Professional ratings
Review scores
Source	Rating
Politiken	5/6 hearts
Gaffa	5/6 stars

Time is a studio album by Danish jazz guitarist Jakob Bro. The album is the second part of a trilogy which also includes Balladeering (2009) and December Song (2013). The trilogy was nominated for the Nordic Council Music Prize 2014.

== Track listing ==
1. "Nat" (4:39)
2. "Cirkler" (7:27)
3. "A Simple Premise" (3:06)
4. "Swimmer (5:22)
5. "Northern Blues" (7:13)
6. "Fiordlands" (4:15)
7. "Yellow" (6.17)
8. "Smaa Dyr" (3:32)

== Personnel ==
- Jakob Bro – composer, producer, guitar
- Bill Frisell – guitar
- Lee Konitz – sax
- Thomas Morgan – bass
