= Rien (Noël Akchoté album) =

Studio album by Noël Akchoté
- Released: 2000
- Recorded: October 1–3, 1999; Eisbach Studios, München
- Genre: Improvised music, jazz
- Length: 67:11
- Label: Winter & Winter 910 057
- Producer: Stefan Winter

Noël Akchoté chronology
J’en Doute Encore (Notes sur le Travail) (1999)	Rien (2000)	Simple Joseph (2001)

Rien is an album by guitarist Noël Akchoté with Erik Minkkinen and Andrew Sharpley recorded in 1999 and released on the Winter & Winter label.

== Reception ==
Professional ratings
Review scores
Source	Rating
Allmusic	3/5 stars
All About Jazz	2.5/5 stars

In his review for Allmusic, Brian Olewnick said "On previous releases, Akchote had displayed considerable chops on his instrument, both in his own compositions and in his deconstructions of standards by, among others, Ornette Coleman. Here he admirably sublimates his technical prowess to the more ambient concept of the pieces, producing sounds bearing little relation to those traditionally associated with the guitar, but owing much to the extended techniques developed by AMM's Keith Rowe. If the outcome is less powerful or organic than that created by longtime practitioners of the genre, it's at least a step in a potentially rewarding direction". On All About Jazz Glenn Astarita noted "Rien progresses at a snails pace and becomes a bit tedious, especially during the midsection. And while there are some intriguing moments, the intentions or perhaps underlying message is a bit confounding at best. Some might find this set to be fascinating; however, when viewed as a whole – Rien fails to sustain any noticeable interest".

== Track listing ==
All compositions by Noël Akchoté, Erik Minkkinen and Andrew Sharpley except as indicated

1. "Gifle" (Noël Akchoté) - 6:39
2. "Pleure" - 4:53
3. "Crache" - 4:54
4. "Mords" (Erik Minkkinen, Andrew Sharpley) - 4:19
5. "Jette" (Akchoté, Minkkinen) - 2:45
6. "Cesse" (Akchoté) - 5:21
7. "Coupe" - 8:06
8. "Hurle" (Akchoté) - 6:57
9. "Parle" - 8:34
10. "Rien" - 6:26
11. "Pousse" (Akchoté) 8:17

== Personnel ==
- Noël Akchoté - guitar
- Andrew Sharpley - turntables, sampler
- Erik Minkkinen - computer
