= Lust Corner =

Studio album by Noël Akchoté
- Released: 1997
- Recorded: June 14 & 20, 1996; Silke Arp, Hannover and Falconer Studio, London
- Genre: Improvised music, jazz
- Length: 47:21
- Label: Winter & Winter 910 019
- Producer: Noël Akchoté and Stefan Winter

Noël Akchoté chronology
Somewhere Bi-Lingual (1997)	Lust Corner (1997)	J’en Doute Encore (Notes sur le Travail) (1999)

Lust Corner is an album by guitarist Noël Akchoté featuring duets with Marc Ribot and Eugene Chadbourne recorded in 1996 and released on the Winter & Winter label.

== Reception ==
Professional ratings
Review scores
Source	Rating
Allmusic	2.5/5 stars
The Penguin Guide to Jazz Recordings	3.5/4 stars

In his review for Allmusic, Scott Yanow said "This is nothing if not a rather weird record... The two guitarists (whether it be Ribot or Chadbourne) constantly echo each other, often out of time and sometimes in different keys. There are dull stretches, but no performance lacks intensity and passion, along with a taste of the absurd. For selective tastes". Richard Cook and Brian Morton's Penguin Guide to Jazz Recordings describes the album as "impressive and confidently understated".

== Track listing ==
All compositions by Noël Akchoté except as indicated

1. "New York" (Ornette Coleman) – 4:48
2. "Street Woman" (Coleman) – 3:23
3. "Chadology" – 4:21
4. "Body and Soul" (Johnny Green) – 2:50
5. "Extensions" – 2:57
6. "Free #1" (Marc Ribot, Noël Akchoté) – 0:55
7. "Interlude #2" – 2:59
8. "Chesire Hôtel" – 3:26
9. "Peace Warriors" (Coleman) – 5:06
10. "Broken Shadows" (Coleman) – 4:18
11. "Pas-vous?" (Eugene Chadbourne, Noël Akchoté) – 6:40
12. "Dirt" (Eugene Chadbourne) – 5:38

== Personnel ==
- Noël Akchoté – electric guitar
- Marc Ribot – electric guitar (tracks 1, 2 & 5–8)
- Eugene Chadbourne – electric guitar, banjo, vocals (tracks 3, 4 & 9–12)
