= Ben Monder =

American jazz guitarist

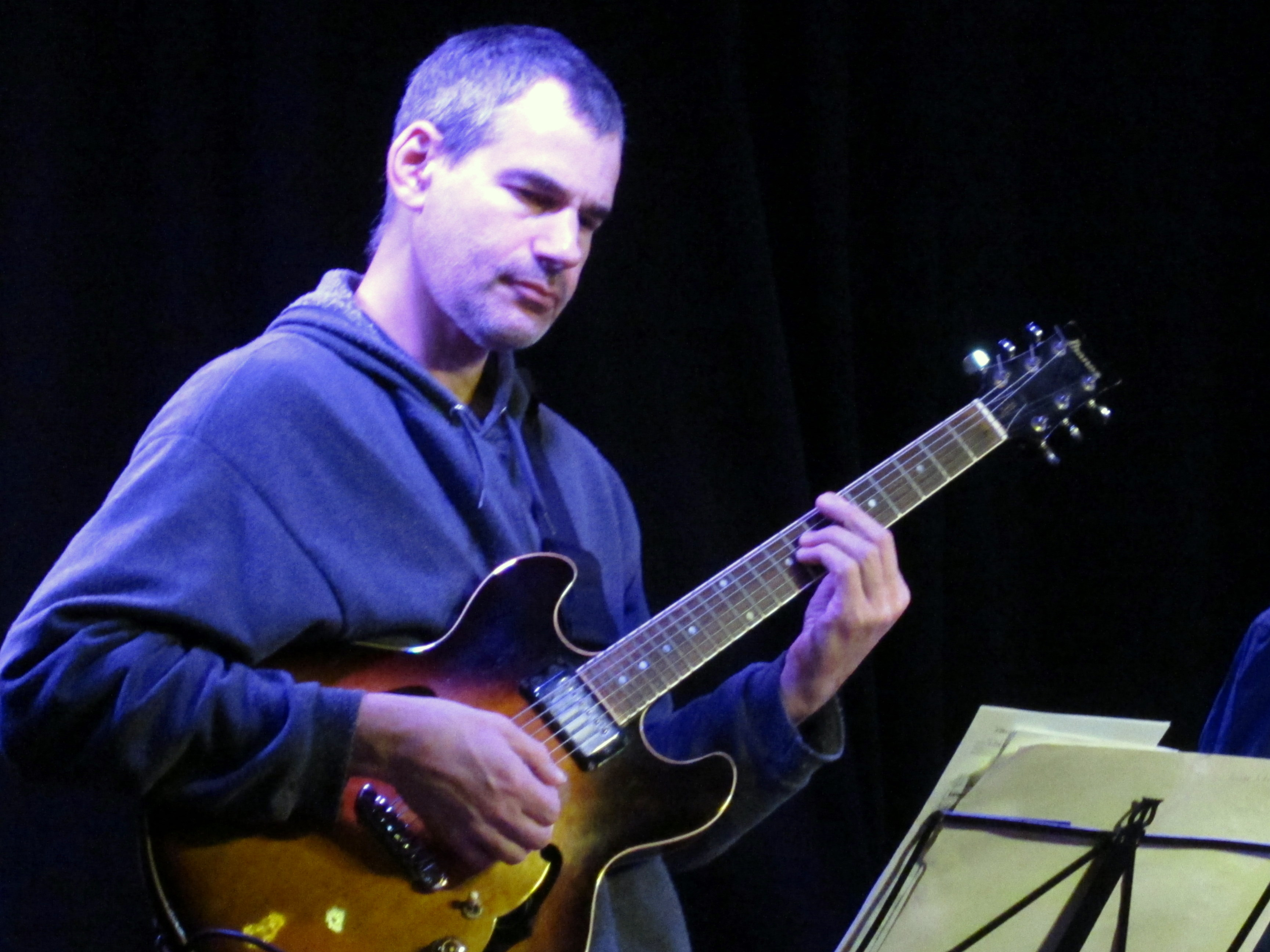
- Ben Monder, Le Moulin à Jazz (France) 2011

Background information
- Born: May 24, 1962 (age 64); New York City, U.S.
- Genres: Jazz
- Occupation: Musician
- Instrument: Guitar
- Years active: 1992–present
- Labels: Arabesque, Sunnyside
- Website: www.benmonder.com

Ben Monder (born May 24, 1962) is an American modern jazz guitarist.

== Biography ==
Monder started playing guitar when he was eleven, after two years on violin. From 1979–84, he attended the Westchester Conservatory of Music, the University of Miami, and Queens College. One of his early jobs was in 1986 when he performed with Jack McDuff.

In 1995 he recorded his debut album, Flux, featuring drummer Jim Black and bassist Drew Gress. This was followed by the trio recording Dust (1996) and the quartet recording Excavation (2000) which added vocalist Theo Bleckmann. Bloom, a 2001 recording (an improvisation recorded in a single day) with saxophone player Bill McHenry, wasn't released until 2010. In between, he released Oceana (2005), a genre-bending solo album, and The Distance (2006), an album with pianist Chris Gestrin and drummer Dylan van der Schyff. In 2007, he recorded At Night with Theo Bleckmann and drummer Satoshi Takeishi. In 2013, Monder released Hydra on Sunnyside, featuring Bleckmann, John Pattitucci, Skúli Sverrisson, and Ted Poor. He made his debut on ECM Records as a leader with 2016's Amorphae, and played guitar on David Bowie's final studio album, Blackstar (2016).

He has worked with Lee Konitz, David Bowie, Paul Motian, Chris Cheek, Tim Berne, David Binney, Theo Bleckmann, George Garzone, Jon Gordon, Julie Hardy, John Hollenbeck, Marc Johnson, Frank Kimbrough, Guillermo Klein, Dave Liebman, Michael Leonhart, Rebecca Martin, Donny McCaslin, Bill McHenry, Charles Pillow, Noah Preminger, Tim Ries, Pete Robbins, Josh Roseman, Maria Schneider, Kendra Shank, Toots Thielemans, Kenny Wheeler, Dan Willis, Miguel Zenón, and Patrick Zimmerli.

From 2002–2005, he taught at the New England Conservatory. As of August, 2021 he is a member of the Minneapolis-based jazz quartet The Bad Plus.

== Discography ==
=== As leader ===
- Flux (Songlines, 1995)
- Dust (Arabesque, 1997)
- Excavation (Arabesque, 2000)
- Oceana (Sunnyside, 2005)
- Hydra (Sunnyside, 2013)
- Amorphae (ECM, 2016)
- Day After Day (Sunnyside, 2019)
- Live at the 55 Bar (Sunnyside, 2021)
- Live in Lisbon (Robalo, 2022)
- Planetarium (Sunnyside, 2024)

=== As co-leader ===
- No Boat with Theo Bleckmann (Songlines, 1997)
- At Night with Theo Bleckmann (Songlines, 2007)
- Bloom with Bill McHenry (Sunnyside, 2010)

With The Bad Plus

- The Bad Plus. (Edition, 2022)
- Complex Emotions (Edition Records, 2024)

=== As sideman ===
With Theo Bleckmann

- Origami (Songlines, 2001)
- Elegy (ECM, 2017)

With Antonio Arnedo

- Travesia (MTM, 1996)
- Orígenes (MTM, 1997)
- Encuentros (MTM, 1998)
- Colombia (MTM, 2001)

With Guillermo Klein

- Los Guachos II (Sunnyside, 1999)
- Los Guachos III (Sunnyside, 2002)
- Live In Barcelona (Fresh Sound, 2005)
- Filtros (Sunnyside, 2008)
- Carrera (Sunnyside, 2012)
- Los Guachos V (Sunnyside, 2016)
- Cristal (Sunnyside, 2019)

With Donny McCaslin

- Seen from Above (Arabesque, 2000)
- Soar (Sunnyside, 2006)
- In Pursuit (Sunnyside, 2007)
- Declaration (Sunnyside, 2009)
- Blow (Motema, 2018)

With Bill McHenry

- Rest Stop (Fresh Sound, 1998)
- Graphic (Fresh Sound, 1999)
- Featuring Paul Motian (Fresh Sound, 2003)
- Roses (Sunnyside, 2007)
- Ghosts of the Sun (Sunnyside, 2011)

With Paul Motian

- Europe (Winter & Winter, 2001)
- Holiday for Strings (Winter & Winter, 2002)
- Garden of Eden (ECM, 2006)

With Noah Preminger

- Dry Bridge Road (Nowt, 2008)
- Haymaker (Palmetto, 2013)
- Some Other Time (Newvelle, 2016)

With Maria Schneider

- Evanescence (Enja, 1994)
- Coming About (Enja, 1996)
- Allegresse (ArtistShare, 2000)
- Days of Wine and Roses (ArtistShare, 2000)
- Concert in the Garden (ArtistShare, 2004)
- Sky Blue (ArtistShare, 2007)
- Data Lords (ArtistShare, 2020)

With Patrick Zimmerli

- Explosion (Songlines, 1997)
- Expansion (Songlines, 2000)
- The Book of Hours (Songlines, 2002)

With others

- Pablo Ablanedo, Alegria (Fresh Sound, 2003)
- David Ake, Humanities (Posi-Tone, 2018)
- Reid Anderson, The Vastness of Space (Fresh Sound, 2000)
- David Binney, The Luxury of Guessing (AudioQuest, 1995)
- David Bowie, Blackstar (Columbia, 2015)
- Chris Cheek, A Girl Name Joe (Fresh Sound, 1998)
- Gerald Cleaver, Adjust (Fresh Sound, 2001)
- Dave's True Story, Sex Without Bodies (Chesky, 1998)
- Yelena Eckemoff, Better Than Gold and Silver (L&H, 2018)
- Jon Gordon, Currents (Double-Time, 1998)
- Drew Gress, Heyday (Soul Note, 1998)
- Nikolaj Hess, Global Motion + (Stunt, 2010)
- John Hollenbeck, No Images (Composers Recordings, 2001)
- Ingrid Jensen, Infinitude (Whirlwind, 2016)
- Marc Johnson, Right Brain Patrol (JMT, 1992)
- Frank Kimbrough, Noumena (Soul Note, 2000)
- Steve LaSpina, Distant Dream (Steeplechase, 1998)
- Rebecca Martin, People Behave Like Ballads (Maxjazz, 2004)
- Dan McCarthy, Epoch (Origin, 2019)
- Francisco Mela, Tree of Life (Half Note, 2011)
- Andy Milne, Forward in All Directions (Contrology 2014)
- Andy Milne, The Seasons of Being (Sunnyside, 2018)
- Ruper Ordorika, Soík So (Nuevos Medios, 1995)
- Ruper Ordorika, Dabilen Harria (Nuevos Medios, 1998)
- Ruper Ordorika, Hurrengo goizean (Metak, 2001)
- Ruper Ordorika, Kantuok jartzen ditut ( Metak, 2003)
- Ruper Ordorika, Haizea Garizumakoa (Elkar, 2010)
- Dave Pietro, Forgotten Dreams (A Records, 1994)
- Mika Pohjola, Landmark (Abovoice, 2002)
- Mika Pohjola, Northern Sunrise (BlueMusicGroup 2009)
- Bruno Raberg, Lifelines (Orbis Music, 2008)
- Tim Ries, Alternate Side (Criss Cross, 2001)
- Tim Ries, The Rolling Stones Project (Concord, 2005)
- Pete Robbins, Do The Hate Laugh Shimmy (Fresh Sound, 2008)
- Josh Roseman, Cherry (Enja, 2000)
- Josh Roseman, Treats for the Nightwalker (Enja, 2003)
- Kendra Shank, A Spirit Free: Abbey Lincoln Songbook (Challenge, 2006)
- Kendra Shank, Mosaic (Challenge, 2009)
- Jeremy Udden, Torchsongs (Fresh Sound, 2006)
- Andre White, Signal (Cornerstone, 2000)
- Miguel Zenon, Looking Forward (Fresh Sound, 2001)
