= Pete Robbins =

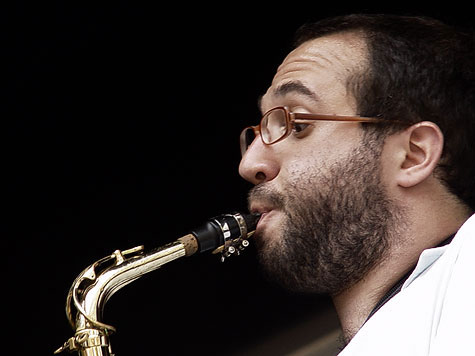
- Pete Robbins, 2007

Background information
- Born: November 28, 1978 (age 47); Queens, New York, U.S.
- Genres: Jazz
- Occupation: Musician
- Instrument: Saxophone
- Website: www.peterobbins.com

Pete Robbins (born November 28, 1978) is an American jazz saxophonist and composer living in Brooklyn.

He graduated from the New England Conservatory in 2002.

He has performed or recorded with Vijay Iyer, John Hollenbeck, John Zorn, Craig Taborn, Mario Pavone, Tyshawn Sorey, Ben Monder, de:Dan Weiss, Thomas Morgan, Melvin Sparks, and Kenny Wollesen, and has performed at festivals and clubs in the U.S. and throughout Europe.

For his compositional achievements, Chamber Music America awarded Robbins with their "New Works: Creation and Presentation" grant as well as their "New Works: Encore" award. Robbins was a guest panelist with the Brooklyn Arts Council and is the Dean at the Brooklyn Conservatory of Music.

== Discography ==
- Centric (Telepathy, 2001)
- Waits & Measures (Playscape, 2006)
- Do the Hate Laugh Shimmy (Fresh Sound, 2008)
- Live in Basel (Hate Laugh, 2011)
- Pyramid (Hate Laugh, 2014)
