= Balladeering (album) =

Studio album by Jakob Bro
- Released: 1 December 2009
- Recorded: September 2008
- Genre: Jazz
- Length: 44:14
- Label: Loveland
- Producer: Jakob Bro

Jakob Bro chronology
The Stars Are All New Songs (2008)	Balladeering (2009)	Time (2011)

Professional ratings
Review scores
Source	Rating
All About Jazz	positive link
Politiken	(5/6) link
Gaffa	(5/6) link

Balladeering is a 2009 studio album by Danish jazz guitarist Jakob Bro.

Balladeering is the first part of a trilogy which includes Time (2011) and December Song (2013). The trilogy was nominated for the Nordic Council Music Prize 2014. The vinyl version of the album came with a DVD featuring the movie Weightless which documented the making of the album.

== Track listing ==
All tracks composed by Jakob Bro

1. "Weightless" (5:32)
2. "Evening Song" (4:40)
3. "Vraa" (7:15)
4. "Starting Point / Acoustic Version" (4:40)
5. "Greenland" (7:18)
6. "Terrace Place" (5:01)
7. "Sort" (4.00)
8. "Starting Point / Electric Version" (6:08)

== Personnel ==
- Jakob Bro – guitar
- Lee Konitz – alto saxophone
- Bill Frisell – guitar
- Ben Street – bass
- Paul Motian – drums
