= Blues Cruise =

Studio album by Chris Cheek
- Released: 2006
- Recorded: March 16–17, 2005
- Studio: Avatar (New York, New York)
- Genre: Jazz
- Label: Fresh Sound New Talent
- Producer: Chris Cheek

Blues Cruise is an album by jazz saxophonist Chris Cheek. It was released by Fresh Sound New Talent.

== Background ==
Cheek had released three albums for Fresh Sound New Talent before this one. In addition to Cheek on saxophones, the Brad Mehldau trio were the other musicians.

== Music and recording ==
The album was recorded at Avatar Studios, New York City, on March 16 and 17, 2005. Mehldau plays Fender Rhodes on some tracks.

== Reception ==
Professional ratings
Review scores
Source	Rating
The Penguin Guide to Jazz	3.5/4 stars

The JazzTimes reviewer wrote that "The group strikes an appealing middle ground between old-school and modernist interpretative styles." The Penguin Guide to Jazz described the album as containing "measured thinking, unexpected and slippery development, and a taste for the macabre."

== Track listing ==
1. "Flamingo" (Grouya-Anderson) – 5:23
2. "Low Key Lightly" (Ellington) – 6:36
3. "Coo" (Cheek) – 6:49
4. "Squirrelling" (Cheek) – 5:42
5. "Song of India" (Korsakov) – 3:47
6. "Falling" (Cheek) – 6:19
7. "Blues Cruise" (Cheek) – 7:43
8. "John Denver" (Cheek) – 6:05
9. "The Sweatheart Tree" (Mancini) – 5:08

== Personnel ==
- Chris Cheek – tenor sax, soprano sax
- Brad Mehldau – piano, Fender Rhodes
- Larry Grenadier – bass
- Jorge Rossy – drums
