= Vine (album) =

Studio album by Chris Cheek
- Recorded: December 20–21, 1999
- Genre: Jazz
- Length: 73:28
- Label: Fresh Sound New Talent
- Producer: Chris Cheek

Vine is an album by jazz saxophonist Chris Cheek. It was released by Fresh Sound New Talent.

== Music and recording ==
The album was recorded at Avatar Studios, New York City, on December 20 and 21, 1999. Mehldau plays Fender Rhodes instead of piano on five of the eight tracks.

"So It Seems" has "winding melodies over a double-time feel and space-age chords that suggest club genres such as jungle and drum-n-bass."

== Reception ==
Professional ratings
Review scores
Source	Rating
AllMusic	4/5 stars
The Penguin Guide to Jazz	3/4 stars

The AllMusic reviewer believed that Cheek's "sophistication as a writer takes a giant leap with Vine, his best album to date".

== Track listing ==
1. "So It Seems" – 9:11
2. "The Wing Key" – 13:06
3. "Vine" – 6:39
4. "Ice Fall" – 7:57
5. "Granada" – 10:35
6. "Reno" – 7:33
7. "What's Left" – 8:56
8. "Not a Samba" – 9:31

== Personnel ==
- Chris Cheek – tenor sax, soprano sax
- Brad Mehldau – piano, Fender Rhodes
- Kurt Rosenwinkel – guitar
- Matt Penman – bass
- Jorge Rossy – drums
