= Tell Me Everything (album) =

2008 album by Ernst Reijseger

Studio album by Ernst Reijseger
- Released: 2008
- Recorded: April 28–30, 2008
- Studio: La Commenda di San Eufrosino; Volpaia, Italy
- Genre: Contemporary classical music
- Length: 68:15
- Label: Winter & Winter
- Producer: Stefan Winter

Ernst Reijseger chronology
Do You Still (2007)	Tell Me Everything (2008)	Zembrocal Musical (2010)

Professional ratings
Review scores
Source	Rating
Allmusic	4/5 stars

Tell Me Everything is a solo album by cellist Ernst Reijseger released in 2008 on Winter & Winter Records.

== Reception ==
James Manheim of Allmusic stated in his review that "there are passages involving hand percussion on the body of the cello, for example, and modern jazz drumming and the freer varieties of jazz in general seem to be important components of the music. ...The jazz influence is by no means thoroughgoing; there are echoes Bach's music for unaccomapanied cello, of Romantic virtuoso music, and of minimalism. Reijseger never does the same thing twice, and in fact the pieces resemble each other very little, which is quite an accomplishment for a disc of solo cello music. The sound, recorded in a medieval Tuscan commenda, or commandry house, is magical".

The song "Tell Me Everything" has been performed by Peter Hudler as a part of his concert Cello on Fire.

== Track listing ==
All music is composed by Ernst Reijseger, except where noted

No.	Title	Music	Length
1.	"Bidderosa"		4:20
2.	"Flurry"	Fumio Yasuda	7:21
3.	"Wake"		6:49
4.	"Tristan's Tune"	Tristan Honsinger	4:46
5.	"Moby's Night Out"		6:07
6.	"Falsetto"		3:06
7.	"Dancing for D"		5:16
8.	"Song of Nenna"	Fumio Yasuda	4:39
9.	"Tempered"		3:40
10.	"Tiny Adventure"		4:18
11.	"Delicato"		1:07
12.	"Comodo Varan"		5:50
13.	"Tell Me Everything"		10:48

== Personnel ==
- Ernst Reijseger – cello
