= Janna (album) =

Studio album by Ernst Reijseger
- Released: June 3, 2003
- Recorded: November 17 & 18, 2002; Espace du Culturel Bois-Fleuri, Lormont, France
- Genre: Improvised music, world music
- Length: 77:39
- Label: Winter & Winter 910 094
- Producer: Stefan Winter

Ernst Reijseger chronology
| I Love You So Much It Hurts (2002) | Janna (2003) | Continuum (2002) |

Janna is an album by cellist Ernst Reijseger with vocalist/poet/performer Mola Sylla and percussionist Serigne C.M. Gueye recorded in 2002 in France and released on the Winter & Winter label.

== Reception ==
Professional ratings
Review scores
| Source | Rating |
|---|---|
| Allmusic | 4.5/5 stars |
| The Penguin Guide to Jazz Recordings | 3/4 stars |

In his review for Allmusic, Thom Jurek said "Textures, dynamic, and tones are the musical concerns as they convey these gorgeous songs, poems, and stories without compromise or regard for ceremony. This is deeply, wonderfully, emotionally rendered exploratory music that cannot be classified, thank goodness".

== Track listing ==
All compositions by Mola Sylla except as indicated

1. "Jangelma" – 12:42
2. "Baba" – 6:42
3. "Sàng Xale Man" (Mola Sylla, Traditional) – 7:19
4. "Noon" – 7:13
5. "Fier" – 7:00
6. "Njaarelu Adiye" – 8:32
7. "Doxandéem" – 9:22
8. "Sicroula" – 8:29

== Personnel ==
- Ernst Reijseger – cello, percussion
- Mola Sylla – vocals, mbira, kongoma, xalam, nose flute, bejjen
- Serigne C.M. Gueye – soruba, djembe, bougarabou, leget
