= I Have the Room Above Her =

Studio album by Paul Motian
- Released: January 24, 2005
- Recorded: April 2004
- Genre: Jazz
- Length: 59:49
- Label: ECM; ECM 1902
- Producer: Manfred Eicher

Paul Motian chronology
| Holiday for Strings (2001) | I Have the Room Above Her (2005) | Garden of Eden (2005) |

I Have the Room Above Her is an album by American jazz drummer Paul Motian recorded for ECM in April 2004 released on January 24, 2005. The trio features guitarist Bill Frisell and tenor saxophonist Joe Lovano, their first release since At the Village Vanguard in 1995.

== Reception ==
Professional ratings
Review scores
| Source | Rating |
|---|---|
| AllMusic | 4/5 stars |
| The Penguin Guide to Jazz Recordings | 3/4 stars |
| The Guardian | 4/5 stars |
| PopMatters | 7/10 stars |
| All About Jazz | 4.5/5 stars |

The AllMusic review by Thom Jurek states, "I Have the Room Above Her is exactly what one would expect from Motian, a painstakingly realized effort that creates a virtual poetic of the measure between the adventure of jazz as creative music and the emotional depth and dimension that convey what is beautiful resoundingly."

The authors of The Penguin Guide to Jazz Recordings called the album "a compelling record, albeit quietly," and noted that the musicians play like "a group of equals rather than a drummer-led group."

Peter Marsh of the BBC wrote: "this is incomparably lovely music, made by one of the most empathic units of recent times. Essential stuff."

The Guardian's John Fordham described the album as "music-making for its own sake, from three old hands of the lateral-lyricism business," and stated that "the melodic senses of all three collaborators are so acute that even the free-fall sounds like something you could hum."

In an article for PopMatters, Robert R. Calder commented: "The performances are more logical than some Motian has led or participated in on disc this past year... he thrashes and churns, which he can and does do quietly when required, rather than apply physically more economical means of generating the polyvalent patterns which commonly do hold together performances in which he takes part."

Writing for All About Jazz, John Kelman called the album "a suitably intrepid yet understated return to the fold," and remarked: "What is truly remarkable is how each member's musical personality, honed in such different contexts when left to their own devices, melds into a distinctive collective personality when placed together."

== Track listing ==
All compositions by Paul Motian except as indicated

1. "Osmosis Part III" – 5:58
2. "Sketches" – 2:35
3. "Odd Man Out" – 4:16
4. "Shadows" – 3:30
5. "I Have the Room Above Her" (Oscar Hammerstein II, Jerome Kern) – 5:34
6. "Osmosis Part I" – 3:30
7. "Dance" – 4:05
8. "Harmony" – 7:08
9. "The Riot Act" – 4:41
10. "The Bag Man" – 5:33
11. "One in Three" – 7:09
12. "Dreamland" (Thelonious Monk) – 5:50

== Personnel ==
=== Musicians ===
- Paul Motian – drums
- Bill Frisell – electric guitar
- Joe Lovano – tenor saxophone

=== Technical personnel ===
- Manfred Eicher – producer
- James A. Farber – recording engineer
  - Aya Takemura – assistant engineer
- Sascha Kleis – design
- Thomas Wunsch – cover photography
- Robert Lewis – liner photos
