= Sonny II =

Studio album by Noël Akchoté
- Released: October 5, 2004
- Recorded: May 23–July 3, 2003
- Genre: Improvised music, jazz
- Length: 54:42
- Label: Winter & Winter
- Producer: Noël Akchoté

Noël Akchoté chronology
Cabaret Modern (2004)	Sonny II (2004)	Der Kastanienball (2005)

Sonny II is an album by guitarist Noël Akchoté featuring tracks composed, performed, or inspired by Sonny Sharrock. The album was recorded in 2003 and released by Winter & Winter.

== Reception ==
Professional ratings
Review scores
Source	Rating
Allmusic	3.5/5 stars
All About Jazz	3/5 stars
The Penguin Guide to Jazz Recordings	3.5/4 stars

In his review for Allmusic, Alex Henderson said "Akchoté's guitar playing is free-spirited but relatively accessible -- certainly by avant-garde jazz standards -- and he speaks a language that is primarily a jazz language but incorporates elements of blues, rock, folk and Latin music" and observed that the album "won't go down in history as a five-star masterpiece, but it's a thoughtful, enjoyably sincere way for Akchoté to acknowledge Sharrock's legacy". All About Jazz said "Sonny II is thoroughly flawed, to the extent it's disjointed and underdeveloped, and to some that might be reason enough for disqualification, but I don't think Noël Akchoté—or Sonny Sharrock—would have it any other way. To be sure, Akchoté doesn't pack the same raw, visceral punch that Sharrock did. But his roots are clear, his debts are paid, and this record is proof". JazzTimes reviewer, Aaron Steinberg, observed "The obtuse French-born guitarist doesn't attempt to replicate Sharrock's fearsome sound. This personal, almost diaristic recording instead considers Sharrock the composer refracted through the guitarist's imagination."

== Track listing ==
All compositions by Sonny Sharrock except as indicated

1. "Blind Willie" – 1:40
2. "Sonny" (Noël Akchoté) – 3:20
3. "Melvins" (Daniel Humair) – 2:45
4. "Gary's Step" – 4:32
5. "Peanut" – 2:04
6. "She's Only Fourteen" – 1:17
7. "Number One Free" (Akchoté) – 1:43
8. "Marpassa Dawn" – 1:12
9. "There Is a Mountain" (Donovan Leitch) – 2:53
10. "Joe" (Akchoté) – 4:27
11. "Dance With Me Montana" – 3:33
12. "Soon" (Linda Sharrock) – 0:52
13. "Dick Dogs" – 1:26
14. "Portrait of Lynda in Three Colors, All Black" – 2:46
15. "Black Woman" – 1:31
16. "Terry" (Akchoté) – 3:47
17. "Bialero" (Traditional) – 1:47
18. "Young and Foolish" (Albert Hague, Arnold B. Horwitt) – 4:40
19. "Long Tale" (Akchoté) – 8:01

== Personnel ==
- Noël Akchoté – guitar
