= Noël Akchoté =

French guitarist

- Born: 7 December 1968 (age 57); Paris, France
- Genres: Jazz, pop, rock, avant-garde jazz, experimental, contemporary classical, free improvisation
- Occupation: Musician
- Instrument: Guitar
- Labels: Winter & Winter, Rectangle

Noël Akchoté (born 7 December 1968) is a French guitarist known for his work in free improvisation and avant-garde jazz. His recordings span jazz, experimental, and contemporary classical music.

== Career ==
Akchoté began studying classical guitar as a child and was performing publicly in Paris by his mid-teens. During the 1990s he emerged on the European improvised music scene, collaborating with artists including Joey Baron, Louis Sclavis, and Henri Texier. He later founded the label Rectangle and has recorded as a leader for Winter & Winter and other independent labels.

== Discography ==
=== As leader ===
- Soundpage(s) (Label Bleu, 1994)
- Somewhere Bi-Lingual (Siesta, 1997)
- Lust Corner (Winter & Winter, 1997)
- Noel Akchote & Bruno Meillier (Orkhestra, 1999)
- Alike Joseph (Rectangle, 2000)
- Rien (Winter & Winter, 2000)
- Simple Joseph (Rectangle, 2001)
- Perpetual Joseph (Rectangle, 2002)
- Lennyk.co.uk? (Signature, 2002)
- Impro-Micro-Acoustique (Blue Chopsticks, 2003)
- Adult Guitar (Blue Chopsticks, 2004)
- Sonny II (Winter & Winter, 2004)
- Ecume Ou Bave (Signature, 2004)
- Les Invisibles (Universal, 2006)
- So Lucky (Winter & Winter, 2007)
- Toi-Meme (Winter & Winter, 2008)

=== As co-leader ===
- Big Four, with Max Nagl, Steven Bernstein, Bradley Jones (Hatology, 2002)

=== As sideman ===
With Corin Curschellas

- Rappa Nomada (Schweiz, 1995)
- Valdun Voices of Rumantsch (Schweiz, 1997)
- Goodbye Gary Cooper (Make Up, 1999)

With David Grubbs

- Aux Noctambules (Rectangle, 1999)
- The Coxcomb (Rectangle, 1999)
- The Spectrum Between (Drag City, 2000)
- Thirty Minute Raven (Rectangle, 2001)
- Rickets & Scurvy (Drag City, 2002)

With others

- Derek Bailey, Close to the Kitchen (Rectangle, 1996)
- Jean-Jacques Birge, Sarajevo (Suite) L'Empreinte 1994)
- Mike Cooper, Island Songs (Nato, 1996)
- Jean-Louis Costes, Vivre Encore (Rectangle, 1996)
- Vincent Courtois, Translucide (Enja, 2000)
- Lol Coxhill, Xmas Songs (Rectangle, 1998)
- Fred Frith, Reel (Rectangle, 1996)
- Philippe Katerine, Nom De Code: Sacha (Rectangle, 2002)
- Phil Minton, My Chelsea (Rectangle, 2011)
- Evan Parker, Live at Les Instants Chavires (Leo, 1998)
- Sam Rivers, Configuration (Nato, 1996)
- Sam Rivers, Eight Day Journal (Nato, 1998)
- Henri Texier, Mad Nomad(s) (Label Bleu, 2002)
- Vert, Some Beans & an Octopus (Sonig, 2006)

== Filmography ==
- 1998 Le jour de Noël (short film by Thierry Jousse with Jacky Berroyer, Claire Denis, Antoine Chappey, Zinedine Soualem)
- 1999 Exhibitions (by John B. Root, with Dolly Golden, Coralie, Karen Lancaume, Élodie Chérie)
- 2001 Nom de Code : Sacha (short film by Thierry Jousse with Katerine, Margot Abascal, Anna Karina)
- 2002 XYZ (by John B. Root, with Titof, Ovidie, Ksandra, Élodie Chérie)
- 2004 Les Invisibles (by Thierry Jousse with Laurent Lucas, Lio, Michael Lonsdale, Margot Abascal)

== Bibliography ==
- Philippe Robert, Musiques expérimentales. Une anthologie transversale d'enregistrements emblématiques. Le Mot et le Reste/GRIM. 2007.
- (Collective, edited by Franck Médioni), Albert Ayler : Témoignages sur un holy ghost, Le Mot et le Reste, 2010.
