= Garden of Eden (album) =

Studio album by Paul Motian
- Released: 3 February 2006
- Recorded: November 2004
- Genre: Jazz
- Length: 56:35
- Label: ECM; ECM 1917
- Producer: Manfred Eicher

Paul Motian chronology
I Have the Room Above Her (2004)	Garden of Eden (2006)	On Broadway Vol. 4 or The Paradox of Continuity (2005)

Garden of Eden is an album by the Paul Motian Band, consisting of guitarists Ben Monder, Steve Cardenas and Jakob Bro, saxophonists Chris Cheek and Tony Malaby, and bass guitarist Jerome Harris, recorded in November 2004 and released on ECM in February 2006.

== Reception ==
The AllMusic review by Thom Jurek awarded the album 4 stars, stating, "Motian has been on a creative and compositional tear, and has been since the mid-'80s. This set is ambitious, full of humor, charm, warmth, and grace; it sings, whispers, talks, and at times it shouts; ultimately it offers listeners an intimate look at the complexity and beauty in the continually evolving soundworld of an artist who is a true musical giant."

Professional ratings
Review scores
Source	Rating
Allmusic	4/5 stars
The Penguin Guide to Jazz Recordings	3/4 stars

== Track listing ==
All compositions by Paul Motian except as indicated

1. "Pithecanthropus Erectus" (Charles Mingus) – 7:06
2. "Goodbye Pork Pie Hat" (Mingus) – 4:56
3. "Etude" – 5:21
4. "Mesmer" – 4:39
5. "Mumbo Jumbo" – 3:34
6. "Desert Dream" (Chris Cheek) – 3:18
7. "Balata" (Steve Cardenas) – 3:39
8. "Bill" (Jerome Kern) – 3:04
9. "Endless" – 3:30
10. "Prelude 2 Narcissus" – 3:05
11. "Garden of Eden" – 4:09
12. "Manhattan Melodrama" – 4:43
13. "Evidence" (Thelonious Monk) – 3:31
14. "Cheryl" (Charlie Parker) – 2:00

== Personnel ==
The Paul Motian Band

- Paul Motian – drums
- Chris Cheek – tenor saxophone, alto saxophone
- Tony Malaby – tenor saxophone
- Jakob Bro, Steve Cardenas, Ben Monder – guitar
- Jerome Harris – bass

Note: Guitarists Steve Cardenas and Jakob Bro are heard on the left and right stereo channels, respectively, while guitarist Ben Monder and bassist Jerome Harris are mixed in the center. Saxophonists Tony Malaby and Chris Cheek are, respectively, center left and center right. Motian's drums are heard across the stereo spectrum, whether soloing or supporting the ensemble.
