= Theo Bleckmann =

German singer & composer (born 1966)

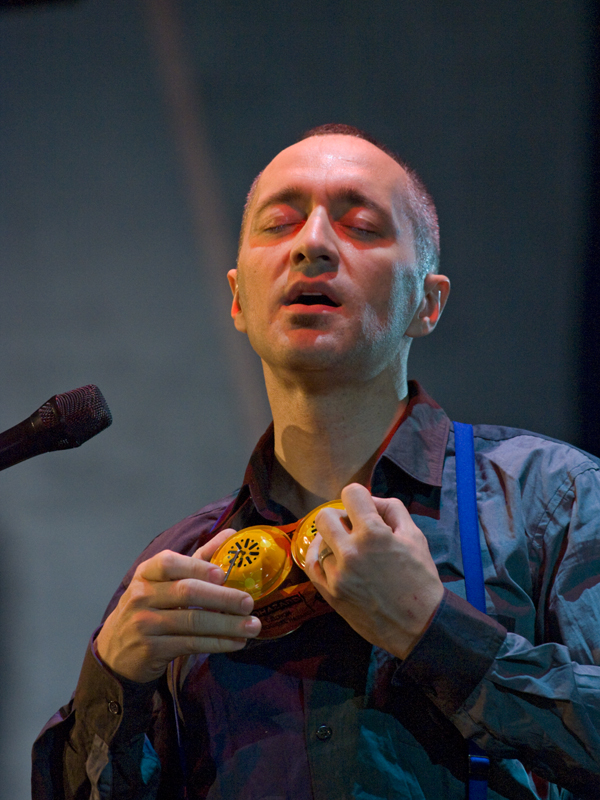
- Bleckmann in 2008

Background information
- Born: Theodor Raoul Bleckmann; May 28, 1966 (age 60); Dortmund, West Germany
- Genres: Jazz
- Occupations: Singer, composer
- Years active: 1989–present
- Label: Winter & Winter
- Website: theobleckmann.com

Theodor Raoul Bleckmann (born 28 May 1966) is a German singer and composer.

== Biography ==
Bleckmann was born in Dortmund, West Germany. He planned to be an ice skater before becoming a vocalist. In 1989 he moved to New York City and recorded his first two albums, Theo & Kirk (1992) and Looking Glass River (1995) with Kirk Nurock. His mentor was Sheila Jordan, and he appeared on her album Jazz Child (1999).

With guitarist Ben Monder he recorded his first solo album, Origami (2001), an album of impressionistic vocalese and lyrics sung in German and French. He subsequently collaborated with Monder on several critically acclaimed albums, as a co-frontman or sideman.

He collaborated with pianist Fumio Yasuda on the albums Las Vegas Rhapsody: The Night They Invented Champagne (2006), Berlin – Songs of Love and War, Peace and Exile (2007), and Schumann's Favored Bar Songs (2009). The last album received a Grammy Award nomination for Best Classical Crossover Album.

He was given the Echo Jazz award for I Dwell in Possibility (Winter & Winter, 2010). The album was inspired by the Arte Povera, the Italian art movement in the 1960s that created installations with the simplest materials. In making the album Beckman used music boxes, megaphones, autoharp, glasses, water, shruti, and toys.

Bleckmann's second collaboration with Yusada was an extension of his love for music from his native Germany, concerning the themes of love, war, and peace. The repertoire consisted of works by composers Hanns Eisler, Kurt Weill, Kristian Schultze with Bertolt Brecht providing much of the texts.

In 2010, he recorded an album as the group Moss with vocalists Peter Eldridge, Lauren Kinhan, Kate McGarry, and Luciana Souza.

With the jazz rock group Kneebody he recorded an album of unorthodox arrangements of compositions by Charles Ives. Four years later he recorded an album songs written by pop singer Kate Bush with drummer John Hollenbeck, bassist Skuli Sverrisson, keyboardist Henry Hey, and Caleb Burhans on viola and guitar.

He has worked with Laurie Anderson, Anthony Braxton, Steve Coleman, Dave Douglas, Philip Glass, Michael Tilson Thomas, John Zorn, and the Bang on a Can All-Stars. He was a guest vocalist with the San Francisco Symphony Chorus, Estonian Radio Choir, Merce Cunningham Dance Company, and Mark Morris Dance. For fifteen years he was a member of an ensemble led by Meredith Monk.

== Performance pieces ==
=== Fidget ===
Bleckmann's multidisciplinary works include a commission by the Whitney Museum of American Art at Philip Morris to compose and create a music performance piece out of Kenneth Goldsmith's text Fidget, which Bleckmann scored for voice, piano, percussion, bass, video and three sewing machines. In real time, four seamstresses sewed a paper suit out of the hundreds of sheets of paper that were Bleckmann's libretto.

=== Mercuria ===
In collaboration with performance artist Lynn Book, he created Mercuria (produced by the Whitney Museum of Contemporary Art in Chicago), incorporating visual and vocal elements of dream and subconsciousness into an evening-length performance piece.

=== The True Last Words of Dutch Schultz ===
Playing the gangster Dutch Schultz, Bleckmann co-created The True Last Words of Dutch Schultz a new music opera in collaboration with director Valeria Vasilevski and composer Eric Salzman.

== Film, television, and theater ==
As a sound improviser, he has performed, created and developed movie, television, and theater scores, among them an alleged space Alien language for Men in Black by Steven Spielberg, Star Trek: Envoy (Meredith Monk), and Kundun (Philip Glass).

Bleckmann sang in John Moran's Book of the Dead at The Public Theater in New York, performed a lead in Bang on a Can's Obie Award-winning opera Carbon Copy Building, and frequently appears as a soloist with The Bang on a Can All-Stars.

In collaboration with director Laurie McCants and set designer Elaine F. Williams, he wrote the music and performed The Alexandria Carry On, which has been traveling the US and was performed at the actual library in Alexandria, Egypt.

== Awards and honors ==
- Grammy Award nomination, Best Classical Crossover Album, 2010
- Echo Jazz Award, Best Singer of the Year, 2010
- Bessie Award, Presser Award for Outstanding Talent
- ASCAP/Gershwin Award for "Chorale No. 1 for Eight Voices"

== Discography ==
=== As leader ===
- Theo & Kirk (Traumton, 1993)
- Looking Glass River (Traumton, 1995)
- No Boat, with Ben Monder (Songlines, SGL 1516-2, 1997)
- Static Still (GPE, 2000)
- Origami (Songlines, 2001)
- Anteroom (Traumton, 2005)
- Las Vegas Rhapsody (Winter & Winter, 2006)
- At Night, with Ben Monder (Songlines, SGL SA1561-2, 2007)
- Berlin (Winter & Winter, 2007)
- Twelve Songs by Charles Ives (Winter & Winter, 2008)
- Refuge Trio (Winter & Winter, 2008)
- Schumann's Favored Bar Songs (Winter & Winter, 2010)
- I Dwell in Possibility (Winter & Winter, 2010)
- Hello Earth! (Winter & Winter, 2011)
- Elegy (ECM, 2017)
- Love Song (Winter & Winter, 2017)
- Mother Goose's Melodies (Winter & Winter, 2017)
- This Land (MRI, 2021)
- My Choice (Winter & Winter, 2021)
- The Parsonage (Sunnyside, 2023)
- Reason (Hammer & String, 2025)
- Scarlatti Sonatas, with Diego Barber (Sunnyside, 2025)
- Love and Anger (Sunnyside, 2025)
- David Lang: Note to a Friend (Cantaloupe Music, 2026)

=== As sideman ===
With Uri Caine

- Vivaldi: The Four Seasons (Winter & Winter, 2014)
- Metamorphosis: Classic Meets Jazz & Modern (Winter & Winter, 2017)
- Gershwin: Rhapsody in Blue (Winter & Winter, 2013)

With John Hollenbeck

- Quartet Lucy (CRI, 2002)
- Joys & Desires (Intuition, 2005)
- All Can Work (New Amsterdam Records, 2018)

With David Lang

- Pierced (Naxos, 2008)
- The Carbon Copy Building (Cantaloupe Music, 2006)

With Ben Monder

- Oceana (Sunnyside, 2005)
- Hydra (Sunnyside, 2013)
- Planetarium (Sunnyside, 2024)

With Meredith Monk

- Impermanence (ECM, 2008)
- Mercy (ECM, 2000)
- Memory Game (Cantaloupe Music, 2020)

With others

- Ambrose Akinmusire, The Imagined Savior Is Far Easier to Paint (Blue Note, 2014)
- Laurie Antonioli, Songs of Shadow, Songs of Light (Origin Records, 2014)
- Diego Barber, Drago (Sunnyside, 2021)
- Jacob Cooper, Terrain (New Amsterdam Records, 2020)
- Anna Dagmar, Let the Waves Come in Threes (2009)
- Mark Dresser, Force Green (Soul Note, 1994)
- Morten Duun, Code Breaker (Cmntx Records, 2024)
- Moritz Eggert, I Belong This Road I Know (Between the Lines, 2005)
- Peter Eldridge, Decorum (2005)
- Gabriel Garzon-Montano, Aguita (Jagjaguwar, 2020)
- Peter Herbolzheimer Bundesjazzorchester, Bujazzo, Vol. 1 (Mons Records, 2008)
- Julia Hülsmann, A Clear Midnight / Kurt Weil and America (ECM, 2015)
- Jazz Big Band Graz, Urban Folktales (ACT, 2012)
- itsnotyouitsme, This I (New Amsterdam Records, 2013)
- Sheila Jordan, Jazz Child (Innova, 1999)
- Jennifer Kimball, Veering from the Wave (Imaginary Road, 1998)
- Jerome Kitzke, The Character of American Sunlight (Innova, 1999)
- Phil Kline, Zippo Songs (Cantaloupe Music, 2004)
- Guy Klucevsek, Song of Remembrance (Tzadik, 2007)
- Guy Klucevsek, The Multiple Personality Reunion Tour (Innova, 2012)
- Joe Locke, Love is a Pendulum (Motema Music, 2015)
- Denman Maroney, Music for Words, Perhaps (Innova, 2010)
- Bobby Mcferrin, VOCAbuLarieS (Emarcy, 2010)
- Kate McGarry, The Target (Palmetto Records, 2007)
- Ikue Mori, One Hundred Aspects of the Moon (Tzadik, 2000)
- Moss, Moss (Sunnyside, 2008)
- Judy Niemack, Straight Up (Sunnyside, 1992)
- Ulysses Owens Jr., Songs of Freedom (Resilience Music, 2019)
- Various, Scandinavian Yuletide Voices (Change Records, 2005)
- Wild Up, The Pieces That Fell to Earth (New Amsterdam Records, 2019)
- Michael Wollny, Weltentraum (ACT, 2014)
- Fumio Yasuda, My Choice (Winter & Winter, 2021)
