= I Got You On Tape =

Danish rock band

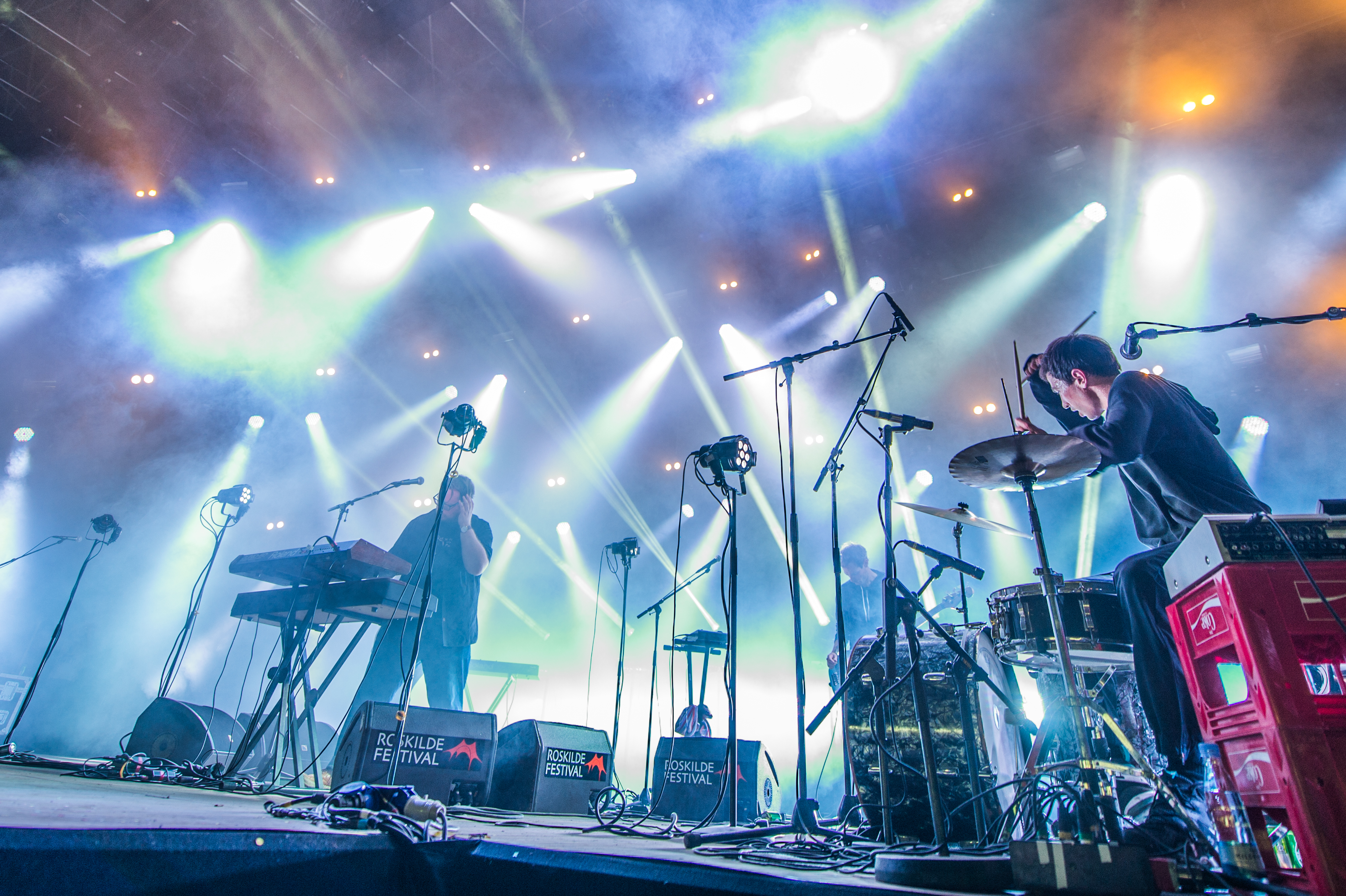
- I Got You On Tape during Roskilde Festival 2012.

Background information
- Origin: Copenhagen, Denmark
- Genres: Rock
- Years active: 2004–present
- Members: Jacob Bellens; Jacob Funch; Jeppe Skovbakke; Rune Kielsgaard
- Past members: Jakob Bro

I Got You On Tape is a Danish rock band formed in 2004 in Copenhagen and originally made up of five members, namely Jacob Bellens (on vocals and keyboard), Jacob Funch (guitar), Jakob Bro (guitar), Jeppe Skovbakke (bass), and Rune Kielsgaard (drums). Jakob Bro left the band after touring their second album.

I Got You On Tape won the "P3 Award" and the accompanying 100,000 Danish kroner on 15 January 2010.

== Discography ==
=== Albums ===
- 2006: I Got You On Tape
- 2007: 2
- 2009: Spinning for the Cause
- 2011: Church of the Real
- 2023: 0

=== Singles ===
- 2010: TNT
