= Mola Sylla =

Senegalese musician (born 1956)

Mola Sylla (born Dakar, Senegal, 1956) is a Senegalese musician. He moved to Europe in 1987 and lives in Amsterdam, Netherlands. He is a singer and plays such traditional African instruments as the mbira, kongoma (Senegalese lamellophone), xalam, and kalimba.

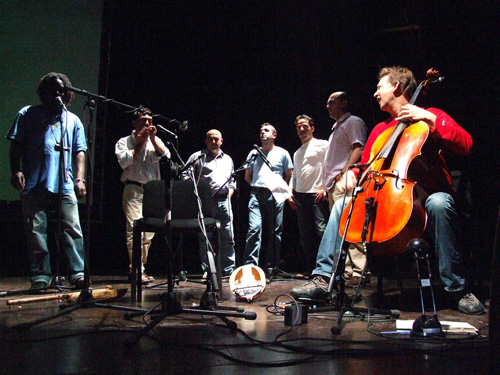
Wild blue yonder music

Sylla has collaborated with a wide variety of musicians, including in jazz and cross-cultural settings. He has worked with Ernst Reijseger, with whom he composed the score to Werner Herzog's 2005 film The Wild Blue Yonder.

He is a founding member of the groups Senemali (a collaboration between Senegalese and Malian musicians) and VeDaKi (formerly Vershki da Koreshki, a quartet made up of Senegalese, Russian, and Indian musicians).

== Discography ==
With Vershki Da Koreshki

- Vershki da Koreshki (Al Sur, 1996)
- Real Life of Plants (Shanachie, 1997)

With Vedaki

- Gombi Zor (Vedaki Records, 1999)
- Samm (Vedaki Records, 2008)

With Volkovtrio

- Much Better (Green Wave Records, 1998)

With Vladimir Volkov

- Seetu/Mirror/Зеркало (Long Arms Records, 2002)

With Ernst Reijseger

- Janna (Winter & Winter, 2003)
- Requiem for a Dying Planet (Winter & Winter, 2006)

With Ernst Reijseger and Harmen Fraanje

- Down Deep (Winter & Winter, 2013)
- Count til Zen (Winter & Winter, 2015)
- We Were There (Just Listen, 2020)
