= So Lucky (Noël Akchoté album) =

2007 album by Noël Akchoté

Studio album by Noël Akchoté
- Released: February 5, 2007
- Recorded: March 21–23, 2006
- Genre: Improvised music, jazz, pop
- Length: 54:42
- Label: Winter & Winter
- Producer: Stefan Winter

Noël Akchoté chronology
| Der Kastanienball (2005) | So Lucky (2007) | Toi-Même (2008) |

So Lucky is an album by guitarist Noël Akchoté featuring tracks composed, performed, or inspired by Kylie Minogue. The album was recorded in 2006 and released by Winter & Winter in 2007.

== Reception ==
Professional ratings
Review scores
| Source | Rating |
|---|---|
| The Penguin Guide to Jazz Recordings | 3/4 stars |

All About Jazz said "French guitarist Noël Akchoté has previously been associated with avant-leaning projects of heady conception and eclectic leanings, so his new recording, So Lucky, may surprise fans for its overtly commercial appeal. A collection of straightforward renditions of diatonic melodies and functional harmonies, emphasizing tunefulness over improvisative exploration, the album's appeal lies in its subtle variations on a theme, tasteful texturing and rubato moments".

== Track listing ==
All compositions by Matt Aitken, Mike Stock and Pete Waterman except as indicated

1. "Bittersweet Goodbye" (Steve Anderson, Kylie Minogue) - 4:19
2. "Some Kind of Bliss" (James Dean Bradfield, Kylie Minogue, Sean Moore) - 3:23
3. "My Secret Heart" - 2:21
4. "Come into My World" (Rob Davis, Cathy Dennis) - 2:59
5. "Red Blooded Woman" (Johnny Douglas, Karen Poole) - 2:54
6. "The Loco-Motion" (Gerry Goffin, Carole King) - 1:38
7. "Can't Get You Out of My Head" (Rob Davis, Cathy Dennis) - 3:32
8. "Giving You Up" (Nick Coler, Miranda Cooper, Lisa Cowling, Brian Higgins, Kylie Minogue, Tim Powell, Paul Woods) - 3:03
9. "Confide in Me" (Steve Anderson, Dave Seaman, Owain Barton) - 3:22
10. "Tears on My Pillow" (Sylvester Bradford, Al Lewis) - 2:21
11. "Fragile" (Rob Davis) - 2:42
12. "Slow" (Dan Carey, Kylie Minogue, Emiliana Torrini) - 3:20
13. "Tell Tale Signs" - 2:50
14. "I Should Be So Lucky" - 3:47
15. "Wouldn't Change a Thing" - 1:51
16. "Turn It into Love" - 2:58
17. "Especially for You" - 3:38
18. "Fever" (Greg Fitzgerald, Tom Nichols) - 3:19
19. "I'll Still Be Loving You" - 2:27
20. "The Crying Game" (Geoff Stephens) - 1:40

== Personnel ==
- Noël Akchoté - guitar
