= Holiday for Strings (song) =

Instrumental composition by David Rose

"Holiday for Strings", written by David Rose, is an instrumental composition best known for its use as the theme song for The Red Skelton Show for more than 20 years and as the theme for the Brazilian game show Pra Ganhar é Só Rodar o Pião da Casa Própria (To win your own house just spin the wheel) aired by SBT. Written in 1942, this piece is still recognized today as a classic American composition. The pizzicato strings and soaring melodies give this composition its distinctive sound.

In 1945, Spike Jones and his City Slickers recorded a version for RCA Victor with various sound effects laughter and a clucking chicken.

Allan Sherman did a version entitled "Holiday for States" mentioning all the 50 states in the union. (SOURCE: From the Allan Sherman album Allan in Wonderland (1964))

George Wright covered the song in his 1984 album Red Hot and Blue.

The piece starts with an introduction with lush instrumentation in C major, moving to F minor and back to C major with the following theme:

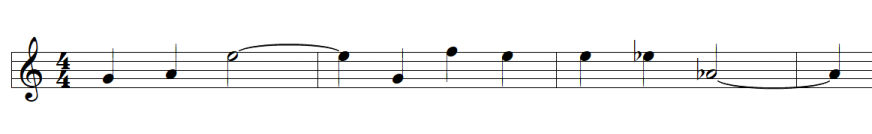

After a short transition setting the pace for the next section, it presents the main theme in pizzicato strings in F major:

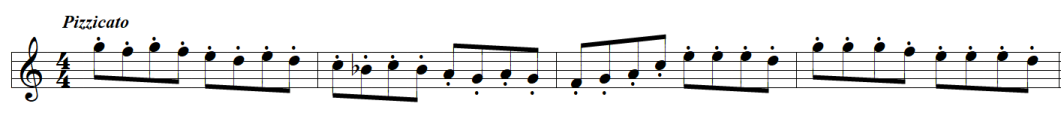

After another transition reinforcing the key of C major, the theme from the introduction reappears in A♭ major:

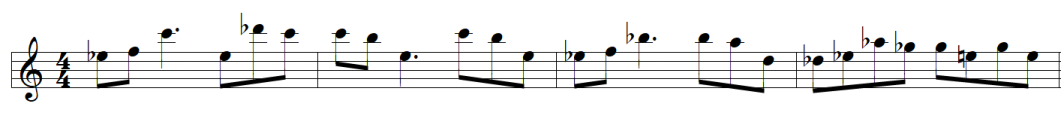

The piece loses steam, and the same theme is transformed with a sentimental swing rhythm and transposed to B♭ major. After a chromatic fanfare modulating back to C major, the main theme recapitulates in its home key and ends after a short Coda section.
