= Chris Cheek =

American jazz saxophonist

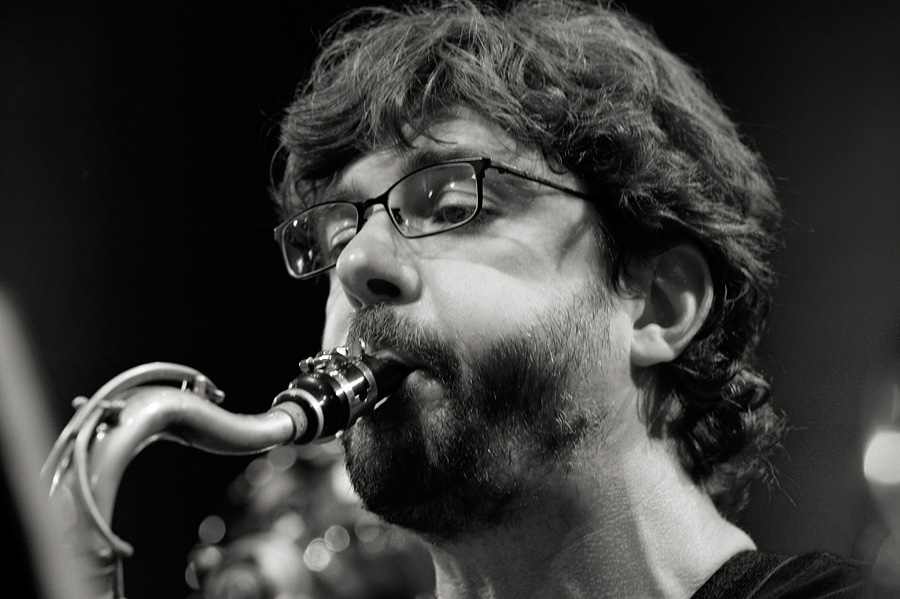
- Cheek at Moers Festival 2009

Background information
- Born: Christopher Carson Cheek; September 16, 1968 (age 57); St. Louis, Missouri, U.S.
- Genres: Jazz, blues
- Occupations: Musician, bandleader
- Instrument: Saxophone
- Years active: 1992–present
- Labels: Fresh Sound, Blue Music Group
- Website: ChrisCheek.net

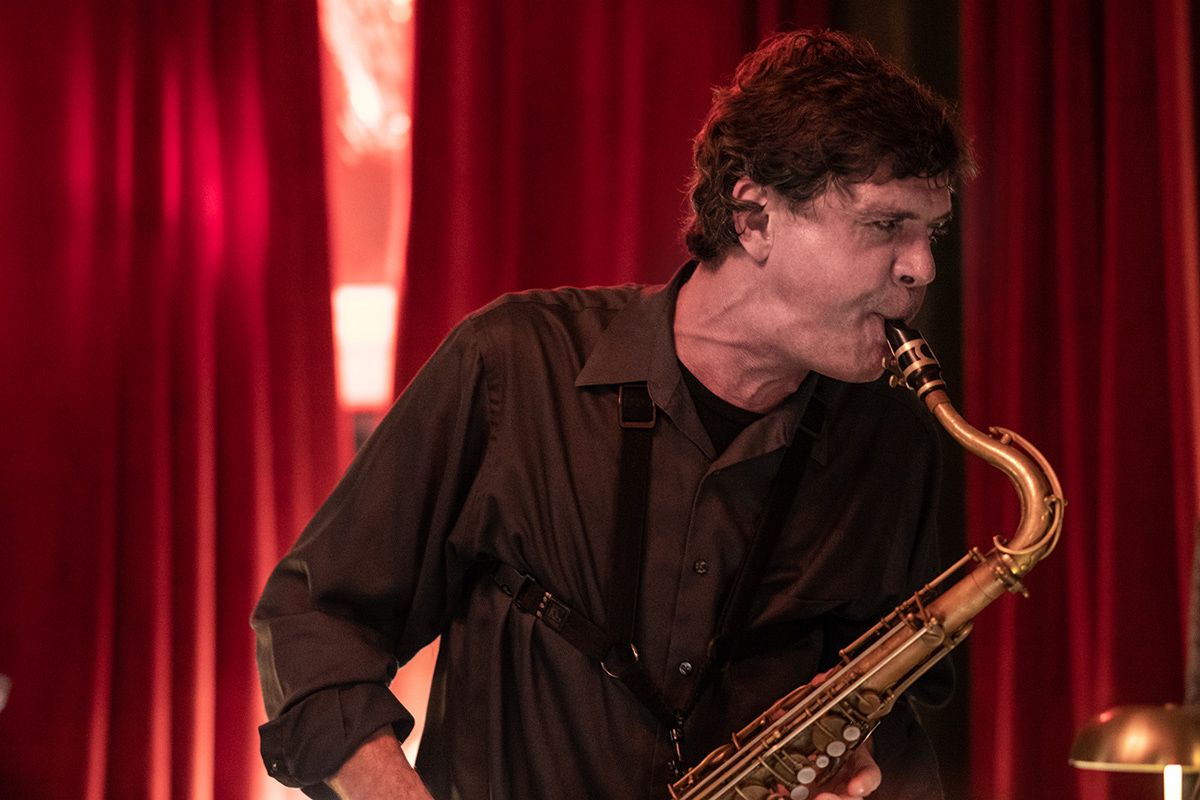
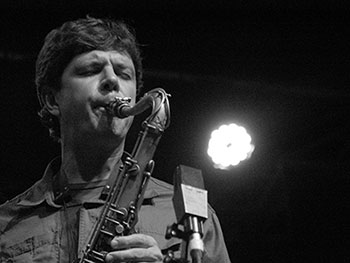
LiteratureXcange Festival in Aarhus (Denmark 2023)

Christopher Carson Cheek (born September 16, 1968) is an American jazz saxophonist.

== Biography ==
Cheek was born in St. Louis, Missouri, where his father was the director of a Junior high school band. Cheek began learning to play the alto saxophone at age eleven, and upon graduation from high school, he attended Webster University. He studied at the Berklee College of Music under Joe Viola, Hal Crook, and Herb Pomeroy, and earned his bachelor's degree. He moved to New York City in 1992, where he played with Paul Motian in the Electric Bebop Band, and co-founded Bloomdaddies with Seamus Blake. He also played with Guillermo Klein, Mika Pohjola, Luciana Souza, and David Berkman.

His debut release as a leader, I Wish I Knew, appeared in 1997 and featured Kurt Rosenwinkel, and by 2010, three more solo albums with Cheek as bandleader on the Fresh Sound label followed; A Girl Named Joe (1997), Vine (1999), and Blues Cruise, in 2005. Two albums as co-leader – Lazy Afternoon and Guilty – were released by Blue Moon in 2002. In 2016 another CD, Saturday Songs, was released by Sunnyside Records and recorded at Supertone Records, Valencia. Criss Cross Jazz have also released two Cheek albums with co-leader Seamus Blake. Cheek has appeared on more than one hundred albums as a session musician.

== Discography ==
=== As leader/co-leader ===
Year recorded	Title	Label	Year released	Personnel
1996–97	I Wish I Knew	Fresh Sound	1997	Quartet, with Kurt Rosenwinkel (guitar), Chris Higgins (bass), Jorge Rossy (drums)
1997	A Girl Named Joe	Fresh Sound	1998	With Mark Turner (tenor sax), Ben Monder (guitar), Marc Johnson (bass), Jorge Rossy and Dan Rieser (drums)
1999	Vine	Fresh Sound	2000	Quintet, with Brad Mehldau (piano, Fender Rhodes), Kurt Rosenwinkel (guitar), Matt Penman (bass), Jorge Rossy (drums)
2000	Guilty	Blue Moon	2002	Quartet, co-led with Ethan Iverson (piano), Ben Street (bass), Jorge Rossy (drums); in concert
2000	Lazy Afternoon	Blue Moon	2002	Quartet, co-led with Ethan Iverson (piano), Ben Street (bass), Jorge Rossy (drums); in concert
2005	Blues Cruise	Fresh Sound	2006	Quartet, with Brad Mehldau (piano), Larry Grenadier (bass), Jorge Rossy (drums)
2013	Reeds Ramble	Criss Cross Jazz	2014	Co-led with Seamus Blake (tenor sax); quintet, with Ethan Iverson (piano), Matt Penman (bass), Jochen Rueckert (drums)
2015	Let's Call the Whole Thing Off	Criss Cross Jazz	2016	Co-led with Seamus Blake (tenor sax); quintet, with Ethan Iverson (piano), Matt Penman (bass), Jochen Rueckert (drums)
2015	Saturday Songs	Sunnyside	2016	Quintet, with Steve Cardenas (guitar), David Soler (pedal steel guitar), Jaume Llombard (bass), Jorge Rossy (drums, vibes, marimba)

=== As member ===
The Bloomdaddies
With Seamus Blake, Jesse Murphy, Jorge Rossy and Dan Reiser

- The Bloomdaddies (Criss Cross Jazz, 1996) – recorded in 1995
- Racer X (self-released, 1998)
- Mosh For Lovers (Fresh Sound New Talent, 2002) – recorded in 2001

=== As sideman ===
With Frank Carlberg

- The Crazy Woman (Accurate, 1995)
- Variations on a Summer Day (Fresh Sound New Talent, 2000)
- In the Land of Art (Fresh Sound New Talent, 2005)
- State of the Union (Fresh Sound New Talent, 2006)
- Uncivilized Ruminations (Red Piano)

With Jen Chapin

- Revisions - Songs of Stevie Wonder (Chesky, 2009)
- Live at the Bitter End (Purple Chair Music, 1999)

With Alan Ferber

- March Sublime (Sunnyside, 2013) – recorded in 2012
- Jigsaw (Sunnyside, 2017)

With Stephane Furic

- Kishinev (Soul Note, 1990)
- The Twitter Machine (Soul Note, 1992)
- Crossing Brooklyn Ferry (Soul Note, 1995)
- Music for 3 (Soul Note, 1997)
- Jugendstil (ESP-Disk, 2008)
- Jugendstil II (ESP-Disk, 2010)

With Charlie Haden's Liberation Music Orchestra

- 2004: Not in Our Name (Verve, 2005)
- 2011–15: Time/Life (Impulse!, 2016)

With Guillermo Klein

- Los Guachos II (Sunnyside, 1999)
- Los Guachos III (Sunnyside, 2002)
- Filtros (Sunnyside, 2008)
- Carrera (Sunnyside, 2012)
- Los Guachos V (Sunnyside, 2016)

With Chris Lightcap's Bigmouth

- Epicenter (Clean Feed, 2015)
- Deluxe (Clean Feed, 2010)

With Paul Motian and the Electric Bebop Band

- Reincarnation of a Love Bird (JMT, 1994)
- Flight of the Blue Jay (Winter & Winter 1996)
- Play Monk and Powell (Winter & Winter, 1998)
- Europe (Winter & Winter, 2000)
- Holiday for Strings (Winter & Winter, 2001)
- Garden of Eden (ECM, 2004)

With Wolfgang Muthspiel

- In and Out (Amadeo, 1993)
- Daily Mirror (Material, 2000)

With Mika Pohjola

- The Secret of the Castle (Blue Music Group, 1997)
- Announcement (Blue Music Group, 1997)

With Rudder

- Matorning (19/8, 2009)
- Rudder (19/8, 2007)

With others

- Live at the Bimhuis - Wild Man Conspiracy feat. Chris Cheek 2018

Burak Bedikyan, Leap of Faith (SteepleChase, 2015) – recorded in 2014

- Brooklyn Boogaloo Blowout, The Boog At Sunny's (Story Sound, 2017)[2CD] – live recorded in 2016
- FOX, Pelican Blues' (Jazz&People, 2016)
- Jared Gold, Intuition (Posi-Tone, 2012)
- Stephane Huchard, Panamerican (Jazz Village, 2013)
- Brad Mehldau, Finding Gabriel (Nonesuch, 2019) – recorded in 2017–18
- Pierre Perchaud, Waterfalls (Gemini, 2012)
- Luciana Souza, The Poems of Elizabeth Bishop and Other Songs (Sunnyside, 2000)
- Steve Swallow, Into the Woodwork (XtraWATT/ECM, 2013) – recorded in 2011
- Miguel Zenón, Identities are Changeable (Miel Music, 2014)
