= The Wild Blue Yonder (2005 film) =

- Poster for the Italian version
- Directed by: Werner Herzog
- Written by: Werner Herzog
- Produced by: Werner Herzog Filmproduktion, Tetramedia, West Park Pictures
- Starring: Brad Dourif; Martin Lo; Roger Diehl; Ted Sweetser; Donald E. Williams; Ellen S. Baker; Franklin Chang-Diaz; Shannon Lucid; Michael J. McCulley
- Cinematography: Henry Kaiser; Tanja Koop; Klaus Scheurich
- Edited by: Joe Bini
- Music by: Ernst Reijseger; Mola Sylla
- Distributed by: Fandango (Italy); Werner Herzog Filmproduktion
- Release date: September 5, 2005 (Venice Film Festival)
- Running time: 81 minutes
- Countries: United Kingdom; France; Germany
- Language: English

The Wild Blue Yonder is a 2005 science fiction fantasy film by German director Werner Herzog. It was presented at the 62nd Venice Film Festival, where it won the FIPRESCI Award. It was screened in competition at the Mar del Plata International Film Festival and the Sitges Film Festival, winning the "Carnet Jove – Special Mention" award at the latter. Most of the film consists of recontextualized documentary footage which is overlaid with fictional (sometimes fantastical) narration. This technique was used in Herzog's earlier film Lessons of Darkness (1992).

The film's name comes from the first line of the song "The U.S. Air Force". The scenes in space are courtesy of NASA. According to the DVD extras, the interview with the alien is filmed in Niland, CA, and nearby Slab City, CA.

== Plot ==
The film is about an extraterrestrial (played by Brad Dourif) who came to Earth several decades ago from a water planet (The Wild Blue Yonder) after it experienced an ice age. His narration reveals that his race has tried through the years to form a community on our planet, without any success.

The alien also tells the story of a space mission he found out about through his job with the CIA. In the late 1990s, debris from the Roswell UFO crash was unearthed and examined. Scientists incorrectly believed that they had contracted an infectious alien disease from the debris. An exploratory mission was launched to Blue Yonder (represented using archive footage from the STS-34 Space Shuttle mission and Henry Kaiser's diving expedition in Antarctica) to explore the possibility of establishing a new, uninfected human colony on the planet. After finding Blue Yonder suitable for human habitation, the astronauts returned home 820 years later, only to discover that Earth had been abandoned in their absence.

== Reception ==
On the review aggregator website Rotten Tomatoes, 69% of 35 critics' reviews are positive, with an average rating of 6.5/10. The website's consensus reads: "An intriguing blend of low budget and high concept, The Wild Blue Yonder brings Werner Herzog's distinctive sensibilities entertainingly to bear on the sci-fi milieu." Metacritic, which uses a weighted average, assigned the film a score of 65 out of 100, based on 11 critics, indicating "generally favorable" reviews.
