= Flight of the Blue Jay =

Studio album by Paul Motian
- Released: 9 May 1997
- Recorded: August 20 & 21, 1996
- Genre: Jazz
- Length: 49:01
- Label: Winter & Winter
- Producer: Stefan F. Winter

Paul Motian chronology
At the Village Vanguard (1995)	Flight of the Blue Jay (1997)	Trio 2000 + One (1997)

Flight of the Blue Jay is an album by Paul Motian, released on the German Winter & Winter label in 1997 and containing performances of bebop jazz standards by Motian with the Electric Bebop Band. The album is the group's third release following the 1992 album Paul Motian and the Electric Bebop Band and the 1995 album Reincarnation of a Love Bird. The band consists of Motian and the saxophonists Chris Potter and Chris Cheek, guitarists Kurt Rosenwinkel and Brad Shepik, and bass guitarist Steve Swallow.

== Reception ==
Professional ratings
Review scores
Source	Rating
AllMusic	3/5 stars
Tom Hull	B+
The Penguin Guide to Jazz Recordings	3.5/4 stars

In a review for AllMusic, Scott Yanow wrote: "the most unusual aspect of the set... is that there are many sections where two different players solo together... Everyone plays well, but nothing really that unexpected occurs... overall, this date falls short of being memorable."

The authors of The Penguin Guide to Jazz Recordings called the album "a strong, mixed programme," featuring a group that is "tightly integrated... responsive to changes in mood and pace, and to subtleties of light and shade." They commented: "it's getting harder to find any more superlatives for [Motian] either as writer or as performer."

== Track listing ==
1. "Flight of the Blue Jay" (Paul Motian) - 3:05
2. "Pannonica" (Thelonious Monk) - 4:31
3. "Brad's Bag" (Kurt Rosenwinkel) - 5:48
4. "Celia" (Bud Powell) - 5:04
5. "The Blue Room" (Lorenz Hart, Richard Rodgers) - 2:49
6. "Milestones" (Miles Davis) - 4:27
7. "Light Blue" (Monk) - 3:02
8. "Conception" (George Shearing) - 5:28
9. "East Coast" (Rosenwinkel) - 5:33
10. "Barbados" (Charlie Parker) - 3:07
11. "Work" (Monk) - 6:07
  - Recorded at Avatar Studios in New York City on August 20 & 21, 1996

== Personnel ==
- Paul Motian - drums
- Chris Potter - tenor saxophone
- Chris Cheek - tenor saxophone
- Brad Shepik - electric guitar
- Kurt Rosenwinkel - electric guitar
- Steve Swallow - electric bass
