= Isabelle Eberhardt =

Swiss explorer and writer

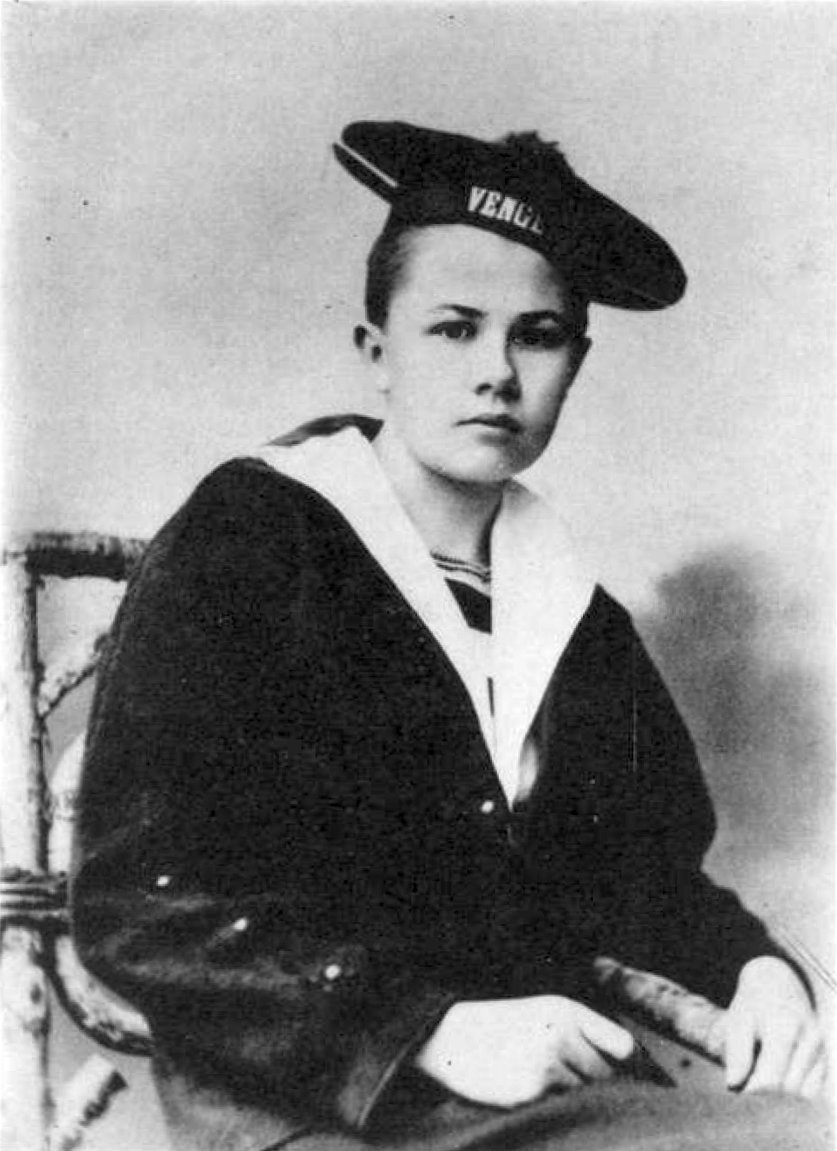
- Eberhardt in 1895
- Born: 17 February 1877; Geneva, Switzerland
- Died: 21 October 1904 (aged 27); Aïn Séfra, French Algeria
- Burial place: Muslim cemetery of Sidi Boudjemâa, west of Aïn Séfra, Algeria
- Other names: Si Mahmoud Saadi, Nicolas Podolinsky
- Occupations: Explorer, writer
- Spouse: Slimane Ehnni (m. 1901)

Isabelle Wilhelmine Marie Eberhardt (17 February 1877 – 21 October 1904) was a Swiss explorer and author. As a teenager, Eberhardt, educated in Switzerland by her father, published short stories under a male pseudonym. She became interested in North Africa, and was considered a proficient writer on the subject despite learning about the region only through correspondence. After an invitation from photographer Louis David, Eberhardt moved to Algeria in May 1897. She dressed as a man and converted to Islam, eventually adopting the name Si Mahmoud Saadi. Eberhardt's unorthodox behaviour made her an outcast among European settlers in Algeria and the French administration.

Eberhardt's acceptance by the Qadiriyya, an Islamic order, convinced the French administration that she was a spy or an agitator. She survived an assassination attempt shortly thereafter. In 1901, the French administration ordered her to leave Algeria, but she was allowed to return the following year after marrying her partner, the Algerian soldier Slimane Ehnni. Following her return, Eberhardt wrote for a newspaper published by Victor Barrucand and worked for General Hubert Lyautey. In 1904, at the age of 27, she was killed by a flash flood in Aïn Séfra.

In 1906, Barrucand began publishing her remaining manuscripts, which received critical acclaim. She was seen posthumously as an advocate of decolonisation, and streets were named after her in Béchar and Algiers. Eberhardt's life has been the subject of several works, including the 1991 film Isabelle Eberhardt and the 2012 opera Song from the Uproar: The Lives and Deaths of Isabelle Eberhardt.

== Early life and family background ==
Eberhardt was born in Geneva, Switzerland, to Alexandre Trophimowsky and Nathalie Moerder (née Eberhardt). Trophimowsky was an Armenian anarchist, tutor, and former Orthodox priest-turned-atheist who had been born a serf. Nathalie was the illegitimate daughter of a middle-class Lutheran German and a Russian Jew. Nathalie was considered to be part of the Russian aristocracy, meaning her illegitimacy was probably kept secret. She married widower Pavel de Moerder, a Russian general forty years her senior, who hired Trophimowsky to tutor their children Nicolas, Nathalie, and Vladimir.

Around 1871 Nathalie took the children and left her husband for Trophimowsky, who had abandoned his own wife and family. They left Russia, staying in Turkey and then Italy before settling in Geneva. Around 1872 Nathalie gave birth to Augustin; de Moerder, who came to Switzerland in a failed attempt to reconcile with Nathalie, accepted the son as his own and allowed him to have his surname, but the boy's older siblings believed that Trophimowsky was the father. General de Moerder died several months later, and despite their separation had arranged for his estate to pay Nathalie a considerable regular income. The family remained in Switzerland. Four years later Eberhardt was born, and was registered as Nathalie's illegitimate daughter. Biographer Françoise d'Eaubonne speculated that Eberhardt's biological father was the poet Arthur Rimbaud, who had been in Switzerland at the time. Other historians consider this unlikely and find it more likely that Trophimowsky was the father, noting that Nathalie and Trophimowsky were rarely apart, that Eberhardt's birth did not impact negatively on their partnership, and that Eberhardt was Trophimowsky's favourite child. Biographer Cecily Mackworth speculated that Eberhardt's illegitimacy was due to Trophimowsky's nihilist beliefs, which rejected traditional concepts of family.

Eberhardt was well educated; along with the other children in the family, she was home-schooled by Trophimowsky. She was fluent in French, spoke Russian, German and Italian, and was taught Latin, Greek, and classical Arabic. She may have learned the latter from her father, who was enthusiastic about Islam as an anti-colonial force. She studied philosophy, metaphysics, chemistry, history, and geography, though she was most passionate about literature, reading the works of authors including Pierre Loti, Jean-Jacques Rousseau, Leo Tolstoy, Voltaire and Émile Zola while she was a teenager, and was also an admirer of the poets Semyon Nadson and Charles Baudelaire. At an early age she began wearing male clothing, enjoying its freedom, and her nonconformist father did not discourage her. The children of de Moerder resented their stepfather, who forbade them from obtaining professions or leaving the home, and effectively used them as slaves to tend to his extensive gardens. Eberhardt's sister Nathalie married against Trophimowsky's wishes in 1888, and was subsequently cut off from the rest of the household. Nathalie's departure had a profound effect on Eberhardt's childhood, as she had been responsible for most of the home duties; the household subsequently suffered from a lack of hygiene and regular meals.

== Move to North Africa ==
Sometime prior to 1894, Eberhardt began corresponding with Eugène Letord, a French officer stationed in the Sahara who had placed a newspaper advertisement for a pen pal. Eberhardt asked him for every detail he could give her about life in the Sahara, also informing him of her dreams of escaping Geneva alongside her favourite sibling, Augustin. Letord encouraged the two of them to relocate to Bône, Algeria, where he could assist them in establishing a new life. In a series of circumstances that remain unclear though involving financial debts and ties to Russian revolutionist groups with which he was affiliated, Augustin fled Geneva in 1894. Eberhardt probably assisted him initially but was unable to keep track of his whereabouts despite making constant inquiries. In November 1894 Eberhardt was informed by a letter that Augustin had joined the French Foreign Legion and was assigned to Algeria. Though she was at first furious with Augustin's decision, Eberhardt's anger did not last; she asked him to send her a detailed diary of what he saw in North Africa.

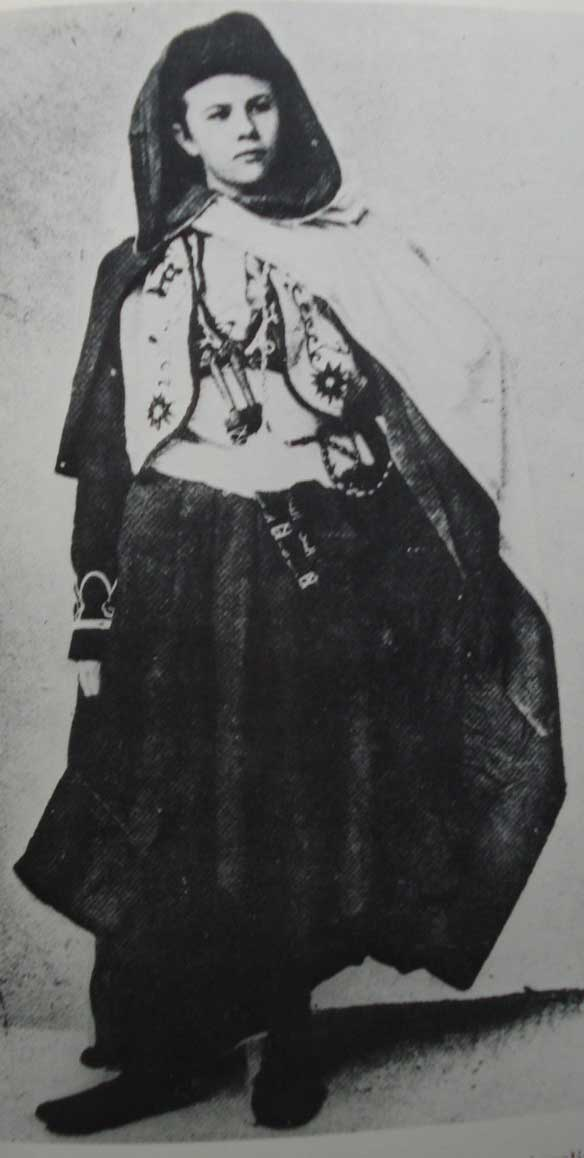
Eberhardt photographed by Louis David in "odds and ends" of Arabic clothing that David owned

In 1895, Eberhardt published short stories in the journal La Nouvelle Revue Moderne under the pseudonym of Nicolas Podolinsky; "Infernalia" (her first published work) is about a medical student's physical attraction to a dead woman. Later that year she published "Vision du Moghreb" [sic] (English: Vision of the Maghreb), a story about North African religious life. Eberhardt had "remarkable insight and knowledge" of North Africa for someone acquainted with the region only through correspondence, and her writing had a strong anti-colonial theme. Louis David, an Algerian-French photographer touring Switzerland who was intrigued by her work, met with her. After hearing of her desire to move to Algiers, he offered to help her establish herself in Bône if she relocated there. In 1895, he took a photograph of Eberhardt wearing a sailor's uniform, which would become widely associated with her in later years. Around 1896, Eberhardt started a correspondence with the Egyptian actor Yaqub Sanu, who went on to become a close friend and introduced her to various Tunisian connections.

Eberhardt relocated to Bône with her mother in May 1897. They initially lived with David and his wife, who both disapproved of the amount of time Eberhardt and her mother spent with Arabs. Eberhardt and her mother did not like the Davids' attitude, which was typical of European settlers in the area, and later avoided the country's French residents, renting an Arabic-style house far from the European quarter. Eberhardt, aware that a Muslim woman could go out neither alone nor unveiled, dressed as a man in a burnous and turban. She expanded on her previous studies of Arabic, and became fluent within a few months. She and her mother converted to Islam. Mackworth writes that while Eberhardt was a "natural mystic", her conversion appeared to be largely for practical reasons, as it gave her greater acceptance among the Arabs. Eberhardt found it easy to accept Islam; Trophimowsky had brought her up as a fatalist and Islam gave her fatalism a meaning. She embraced the Islamic concept that everything is predestined and the will of God.

Although Eberhardt largely devoted herself to the Muslim way of life, she frequently consumed both marijuana and alcohol and had many lovers, including several of her Algerian acquaintances. According to a friend, Eberhardt "drank more than a Legionnaire, smoked more kief than a hashish addict and made love for the love of making love". She was heterosexual, but often treated sexual intercourse as impersonal. The reason for her Arabic companions' tolerance of her lifestyle has been debated by biographers. According to Mackworth, the "delicate courtesy of the Arabs" led them to treat Eberhardt as a man because she wished to live as one. Mark Sedgwick further states that Eberhard was serious about studying and committing to Sufi practice, even though she did not observe many aspects of the Sharia. Eberhardt's behaviour made her an outcast with the French settlers and the colonial administration, who watched her closely. Seeing no reason why a woman would choose the company of impoverished Arabs over her fellow Europeans, they eventually concluded she must be an English agent, sent to stir up resentment towards the French.

Eberhardt began to write stories, including the first draft of her novel Trimardeur (English: Vagabond). Her story Yasmina, about a young Bedouin woman who falls in love with a French officer and the "tragedy this impossible love brings into her life", was published in a local French newspaper. Her mother, who had been suffering from heart problems, died in November 1897 of a heart attack, and was buried under the name of Fatma Mannoubia. Eberhardt was grief-stricken. Trophimowsky, who had been summoned when his partner's health had deteriorated but arrived after her death, showed no sympathy towards Eberhardt. When she told him she desperately wanted to die and rejoin her mother, he responded by calmly offering her his revolver, which she declined.

== Travels to Europe ==
Eberhardt spent her money recklessly in Algiers, and quickly exhausted the funds left to her by her mother; she would often spend several days at a time in kief dens. Augustin, ejected from the Foreign Legion due to his health, returned to Geneva alongside Eberhardt in early 1899. They found Trophimowsky in poor health, suffering from throat cancer and traumatised by the loss of Eberhardt's mother and Vladimir, who had committed suicide the previous year. Eberhardt nursed her father, growing closer to him. She also commenced a relationship and became engaged to Riza Bey, an Armenian diplomat with whom she had been friends and possibly lovers when she was seventeen. Though Trophimowsky approved of the engagement, the relationship soon ended. Historian Lesley Blanch attributes the relationship's downfall to Bey being assigned to Stockholm. Trophimowsky died in May. Blanch attributes the death to a chloral overdose, with which Eberhardt may have intentionally euthanised him. Eberhardt intended to sell the villa, although Trophimowsky's legitimate wife opposed the execution of the will. After several weeks of legal contentions, Eberhardt mortgaged the property and returned to Africa on the first available ship. With both parents dead, she considered herself free of human attachments and able to live as a vagabond. Eberhardt relinquished her mother's name, and called herself Si Mahmoud Saadi. She began wearing male clothing exclusively and developed a masculine personality, speaking and writing as a man. Eberhardt behaved like an Arab man, challenging gender and racial norms. Asked why she dressed as an Arab man, she invariably replied: "It is impossible for me to do otherwise." A few months later, Eberhardt's money ran low, and she returned to Geneva to sell the villa; due to the legal troubles there was little to no money available.

Encouraged by a friend, she went to Paris to become a writer but had little success. While in Paris Eberhardt met the widow of Marquis de Morès. Although de Morès had been reportedly murdered by Tuareg tribesmen in the Sahara, no one had been arrested. When his widow learned that Eberhardt was familiar with the area where de Morès died, she hired her to investigate his murder. The job benefited Eberhardt, who was destitute and longed to return to the Sahara. She returned to Algeria in July 1900, settling in El Oued. According to Sahara expert R. V. C. Bodley, Eberhardt made little effort to investigate de Morès' death; Bodley considered this due to a combination of the unwillingness of the French to co-operate in an investigation and Eberhardt's fatalism rather than deliberate dishonesty. Word eventually got back to the de Morès widow about Eberhardt's lackluster investigation, and she subsequently cut off her funding.

Eberhardt made friends in the area and met Slimane Ehnni, a non-commissioned officer in the spahis. They fell in love, and eventually lived together openly. This alienated Eberhardt from the French authorities, who were already outraged by her lifestyle. During her travels she made contact with the Qadiriyya, a Sufi order. The order was led by Hussein ben Brahim, who was so impressed with Eberhardt's knowledge of (and passion for) Islam that he initiated her into his zawiya without the usual formal examination. This convinced the French authorities that she was a spy or an agitator, and they placed her on a widely circulated blacklist. The French transferred Ehnni to the spahi regiment at Batna, possibly to punish Eberhardt (whom they could not harm directly). Too poor to accompany him to Batna, Eberhardt traveled to a Qadiriyya meeting in Behima in late January 1901 where she hoped to ask Si Lachmi, a marabout, for financial assistance. While waiting for the meeting to begin she was attacked by a man with a sabre, receiving a superficial wound to her head and a deep cut to her left arm. Her attacker, Abdallah ben Mohammed, was overpowered by others and arrested. When asked why he had tried to kill Eberhardt he only repeated "God wished it; God still wishes it." Eberhardt suspected that he was an assassin hired by the French authorities. Others attribute the attack to Si Lachmi; Eberhardt was his mistress, whom he had grown tired of, and it is speculated he was simultaneously trying to get rid of her and pin the blame for the attack on a rival tribe. She was brought to the military hospital at El Oued the following day. After Eberhardt recovered in late February, she joined Ehnni with funds from members of the Qadiriyya who regarded her survival as a miracle.

After spending two months in Batna with Ehnni, the French ordered her to leave North Africa without explanation; as an immigrant, she had no choice but to comply. Ehnni requested permission from his military superiors to marry Eberhardt (which would have enabled her to stay), but his request was denied. She traveled to France in early May 1901, staying with Augustin and his wife and daughter in Marseille. In mid-June she was summoned back to Constantine to give evidence at the trial of her attacker, who maintained his statement that God had ordered him to kill Eberhardt, though expressed remorse towards her. Eberhardt said that she bore no grudge against Abdallah, forgave him, and hoped that he would not be punished. Abdallah received life imprisonment although the prosecutor had asked for the death penalty. When the trial ended, Eberhardt was again ordered to leave the country. She returned to live with Augustin, working with him (disguised as a man) as a dock labourer. Eberhardt and Augustin's family lived in appalling poverty. Eberhardt's health deteriorated, and she repeatedly suffered from fevers. She attempted suicide while in Marseille, one of several attempts she would make over the course of her life. Eberhardt continued to write during this time, working on several projects including her novel Trimardeur.

A friend of Eberhardt's gave her a letter of introduction to playwright Eugène Brieux, who opposed French rule in North Africa and supported Arab emancipation. He sent her a several-hundred-franc advance and tried to have her stories published, but could not find anyone willing to publish pro-Arab writing. Eberhardt, unfazed, continued writing; her morale lifted when Ehnni was transferred to a spahi regiment near Marseille in late August to complete his final months of service. He did not require permission from his military superiors to marry in France, and he and Eberhardt were married in October 1901. Shortly before the wedding, Eberhardt and Augustin received the news that Trophimowsky's estate had finally been sold, though due to the mounting legal costs there was no money left for them to inherit. With this news, Eberhardt abandoned any hope of having a financially secure future. In February 1902 Ehnni was discharged, and the couple returned to Bône to live with his family.

== Later life and death ==
After a short time living with Ehnni's family, the couple relocated to Algiers. Eberhardt became disappointed with Ehnni, whose only ambition after leaving the army appeared to be finding an unskilled job that would allow him to live relatively comfortably. She increased her own efforts as a writer, and several of her short stories were printed in the local press. She accepted a job offer from Al-Akhbar (English: The News) newspaper publisher Victor Barrucand in March 1902. Eberhardt became a regular contributor to the newspaper; Trimardeur began appearing as a serial in August 1903. Barrucand and Eberhardt formed a friendship, though Barrucand was frequently frustrated with his new employee's work ethic. Eberhardt's articles arrived irregularly, as she would only write when she felt like doing so. Her job paid poorly, but had many benefits. Through Barrucand's contacts, Eberhardt was able to access the famous zawiya of Lalla Zaynab. Eberhardt spoke highly of her time with Zaynab, though never disclosed what the two discussed; their meeting caused concern among the French authorities.

Eberhardt and Ehnni relocated to Ténès in July 1902 after Ehnni obtained employment there as a translator. Eberhardt was incorrigibly bad with her money, spending anything she received immediately on tobacco, books, and gifts for friends, and pawning her meagre possessions or asking for loans when she realised there was no money left for food. This behaviour made her even more of a pariah among the other European residents of the town. Eberhardt would frequently leave for weeks at a time, being either summoned to Algiers by Barrucand or sent on assignments. She was given a regular column in his newspaper, where she wrote about the life and customs of Bedouin tribes. Both Ehnni and Eberhardt's health deteriorated, with Eberhardt regularly suffering from bouts of malaria. She was also probably affected by syphilis.

Barrucand dispatched Eberhardt to report on the aftereffects of the 2 September 1903 Battle of El-Moungar. She stayed with French Foreign Legion soldiers and met Hubert Lyautey, the French general in charge of Oran, at their headquarters. Eberhardt and Lyautey became friends and, due to her knowledge of Islam and Arabic, she became a liaison between him and the local Arab people. While Eberhardt never ceased protesting against any repressive actions undertaken by the French administration, she believed that Lyautey's approach, which focused on diplomacy rather than military force, would bring peace to the region. Although details are unclear, it is generally accepted that Eberhardt also engaged in espionage for Lyautey. Concerned about a powerful marabout in the Atlas Mountains, Lyautey sent her to meet with him in 1904.

At the marabout's zawiya, Eberhardt was weakened by fever. She returned to Aïn Séfra, and was treated at the military hospital. She left the hospital against medical advice and asked Ehnni, from whom she had been separated for several months, to join her. Reunited on 20 October 1904, they rented a small mud house. The following day, a flash flood struck the area. As soon as the waters subsided, Lyautey launched a search for her. Ehnni was discovered almost immediately, saying that Eberhardt had been swept away by the water. Based on this information, Lyautey and his men searched the surrounding area for several days before deciding to explore the ruins of the house where the couple had stayed. Her body was crushed under one of the house's supporting beams. The exact circumstances of her death were never discovered. While suspicions regarding Ehnni have been raised by later biographers, Eberhardt had always believed she would die young and may instead have accepted her fate. Mackworth speculated that after initially trying to run from the floodwaters, Eberhardt instead turned back to face them. Blanch argued that due to Eberhardt's history of suicidal tendencies, she probably would have still chosen to stay in the area even if she had known the flood was coming. Lyautey buried Eberhardt in Aïn Sefra and had a marble tombstone, engraved with her adopted name in Arabic and her birth name in French, placed on her grave.

== Legacy ==
At the time of her death, Eberhardt's possessions included several of her unpublished manuscripts. Lyautey instructed his soldiers to search for all of her papers in the aftermath of the flood, and posted those that could be found to Barrucand. After reconstructing them, substituting his own words where the originals were missing or too damaged to decipher, he began to publish her work. Some of what he published is considered to be more his work than Eberhardt's. Barrucand also received criticism for listing himself as the co-author of some of the publications, and for not clarifying which portions of text were his own. The first posthumous story, "Dans l'Ombre Chaude de l'Islam" (In the Warm Shadow of Islam) received critical acclaim when it was published in 1906. The book's success drew great attention to Eberhardt's writing and established her as among the best writers of literature inspired by Africa. A street was named after Eberhardt in Béchar and another in Algiers. The street in Algiers is in the outskirts; one writer at the time commented there was a sad symbolism in the fact the street "begins in an inhabited quarter and peters out into a wasteland". She was posthumously seen as an advocate of feminism and decolonisation; according to Hedi Abdel-Jaouad in Yale French Studies, her work may have begun the decolonisation of North Africa. Eberhardt's relationship with Lyautey has triggered discussion by modern historians about her complicity in colonialism.

In 1954, author and explorer Cecily Mackworth published the biography The Destiny of Isabelle Eberhardt after following Eberhardt's routes in Algeria and the Sahara. The book inspired Paul Bowles to translate some of Eberhardt's writings into English. Novelist William Bayer published Visions of Isabelle, a fictionalised 1976 account of her life. In 1981, Timberlake Wertenbaker premiered New Anatomies, a play about Eberhardt. In 1988, Annette Kobak published Isabelle, The Life of Isabelle Eberhardt, a biography of Eberhardt, and also translated Eberhardt’s novel Vagabond. In 2026, Hédi A. Jaouad published The Immortal Journeys of Isabelle Eberhardt, a biography of her life.

Eberhardt has been portrayed in two films. Leslie Thornton directed a 1988 biography, There Was An Unseen Cloud Moving, with seven amateur actresses playing Eberhardt. Ian Pringle directed Isabelle Eberhardt, starring Mathilda May, in 1991. In 1994, the soundtrack for Pringle's film was released by musician Paul Schütze, titled Isabelle Eberhardt: The Oblivion Seeker. In 1998, John Berger and Nella Bielski published Isabelle: A Story in Shots, a screenplay based on Eberhardt's life. Missy Mazzoli composed an opera, Song from the Uproar: The Lives and Deaths of Isabelle Eberhardt, in 2012. In 2018 Virginie Greiner and Annabel published the graphic novel Isabelle Eberhardt: La Vagabonde des Sables.

== Works ==
- "Dans l'ombre chaude de l'Islam" (Paris: Fasquelle, 1906)
- "Notes de route: Maroc-Algérie-Tunisie" (Paris: Fasquelle, 1908)
- "Au Pays des sables" (Bône, Algeria: Em. Thomas, 1914)
- "Pages d'Islam" (Paris: Fasquelle, 1920)
- Trimardeur (Paris: Fasquelle, 1922)
- "Mes journaliers; précédés de la Vie tragique de la bonne nomade par René-Louis Doyon" (Paris: La Connaissance, 1923)
- "Amara le forçat; L'anarchiste: Nouvelles inédites" (Abbeville: Frédéric Paillard, 1923)
- "Contes et paysages" (Paris: La Connaissance, 1925)
- "Yasmina et autres nouvelles algériennes" (Paris: Liana Levi, 1986)
- "Ecrits sur le sable" (Paris: Éditions Grasset, 1988)
- "Rakhil: Roman inédit" (Paris: La Boîte à documents, 1990)
- "Un voyage oriental: Sud Oranais" (Paris: Le Livre de Poche, 1991)
- "Amours nomades" (Paris: Éditions Gallimard, 2003)
