= Virgin Ambient series =

The Virgin Ambient Series is a series of albums released on the UK Virgin Records label between 1993 and 1997. Of the 24 albums released in the series, 15 were compilations.

== Discography ==
UK catalog number	International catalog number(s)/UPC(s)	Artist	Title	Format	Released
AMBT1	7243 8 39041 2 9	Various Artists	Ambient 1: A Brief History of Ambient	(2CD)	1993
AMBT2	7243 8 39246 2 2	Various Artists	Ambient 2: Imaginary Landscapes	(2 CDs)	1993
AMBT3	7243 8 39625 2 5	Various Artists	Ambient 3: Music of Changes	(2 CDs)	1994
AMBT4	7243 8 39810 2 1	Various Artists	Ambient 4: Isolationism	(2 CDs)	1994
AMBT5	7243 8 40104 2 3; 0170 4 61895 2 1	Edgar Froese	Beyond the Storm	(2 CDs)	1995
AMBT6	7243 8 32233 2 9	Paul Schutze	Apart	(2 CDs)	1995
AMBT7	7243 8 40475 2 8; 0170 4 61795 2 2	Various Artists	Macro Dub Infection Volume 1	(2 CDs)	1995
AMBT8	7243 8 40404 2 0; 0170 4 61796 2 1	Techno Animal	Re-Entry	(2 CDs)	1995
AMBT9	7243 8 40499 2 8	Sufi	Life's Rising	(1 CD)	1995
AMBT10	7243 8 41367 2 7	Various Artists	Ocean of Sound	(2 CDs)	1996
AMBT11	7243 8 41715 2 0	Various Artists	Monsters, Robots, and Bugmen	(2 CDs)	1996
AMBT12	7243 8 41902 2 4	Various Artists	Jazz Satellites Volume 1: Electrification	(2 CDs)	1996
AMBT13	7243 8 41718 2 7	Various Artists	Ocean of Sound 2: Crooning on Venus	(2 CDs)	1996
AMBT14	7243 8 41764 2 6	Various Artists	Macro Dub Infection Volume 2	(2 CDs)	1996
AMBT15	7243 8 42015 2 4	Penguin Cafe Orchestra	Preludes, Airs, and Yodels	(1 CD)	1996
AMBT16	7243 8 42050 2 7	Various Artists	Sugar and Poison	(2 CDs)	1996
AMBT17	7243 8 42176 2 4	Sidewinder	Colonized	(1 CD)	1996
AMBT18	7243 8 42078 2 3	David Toop	Pink Noir	(1 CD)	1996
AMBT19	7243 8 42175 2 5	Paul Schutze	Abysmal Evenings	(1 CD)	1996
AMBT20	7243 8 44089 2 3	Various Artists	Ocean of Sound 3: Booming on Pluto	(2 CDs)	1997
AMBT21	7243 8 44060 2 8	Phantom City	Shiva Recoil: Live Unlive	(1 CD)	1997
AMBT22	7243 8 44748 2 9	David Toop	Spirit World	(1 CD)	1997
AMBT23	7243 8 44811 2 4	Paul Schutze	Second Site	(2 CDs)	1997
AMBT24	7243 8 44799 2 3	Various Artists	Ocean of Sound 4: Guitars on Mars	(2 CDs)	1998
AMBT25		Various Artists	Jazz Satellites Volume 2: Boxed Set	(3 CDs)	1997
