= Shiva Recoil: Live/Unlive =

Live album by Paul Schütze and Phantom City
- Released: 1997
- Recorded: November 3, 1996 at Tampere Jazz Happening, Pakkahuone, Finland
- Genre: Jazz fusion, electronic
- Length: 52:47
- Label: Virgin
- Producer: Paul Schütze

Paul Schütze chronology
Abysmal Evenings (1996)	Shiva Recoil: Live/Unlive (1997)	Nine Songs From the Garden of Welcome Lies (1997)

Shiva Recoil: Live/Unlive is a live performance album by Paul Schütze and Phantom City, released in 1997 through Virgin Records. Shiva Recoil is a companion to Shütze'sSite Anubis (1996), a studio-only album featuring most of the same musicians.

AllMusic rated it four and a half stars.

== Track listing ==
All music is composed by Paul Schütze.

No.	Title	Length
1.	"Black Data II"	13:59
2.	"Black Data I"	38:48

== Personnel ==
Musicians

- Raoul Björkenheim – guitar
- Alex Buess – bass clarinet, engineering, mixing
- Toshinori Kondo – trumpet
- Bill Laswell – bass guitar
- Paul Schütze – keyboards, tape, production, illustration, photography
- Dirk Wachtelaer – drums

Production and additional personnel

- Anne-Louise Falsone – illustration
- Maarit Kytöharju – photography
- Simon Heyworth – mastering
- Andrew Hulme – mixing
- Antti Sjöholm – recording
- Piikki Vainionpaa – mixing
- Tage Ylitalo – engineering
