= Site Anubis =

Studio album by Paul Schütze and Phantom City
- Released: 1996
- Recorded: Wolff 2.8.1 Studio, Basel, Switzerland
- Genre: Jazz fusion, electronic
- Length: 59:30
- Label: Big Cat UK
- Producer: Paul Schütze

Paul Schütze chronology
Vertical Memory (1995)	Site Anubis (1996)	Fell (1996)

Professional ratings
Review scores
Source	Rating
Allmusic	4.5/5 stars

Site Anubis is an album by Paul Schütze and Phantom City, released in 1996 through Big Cat Records. It is a concept album in which urban catastrophe is caused by an 800-foot statue of the Egyptian god Anubis.

== Background and recording ==
Though the album credits all songs as being written by Paul Schütze, Schütze has said that "None of it was written - it was all improvised." The album was recorded through dubbing parts played by musicians who never met in person; bassist Bill Laswell played over Schütze's electronics in New York, then passed the results to drummer Dirk Wachtelaer in Brussels, who recorded his parts and then passed the music on to the next performer.

Several of the album's musicians united for live performances, which are documented on Shiva Recoil: Live/Unlive (1997).

== Track listing ==
All music is composed by Paul Schütze

No.	Title	Length
1.	"Future Nights"	12:23
2.	"An Early Mutation"	7:25
3.	"Blue Like Petrol"	7:15
4.	"The Big God Blows In"	7:03
5.	"Ten Acre Ghost"	6:30
6.	"Eight Legs Out of Limbo"	12:34
7.	"Inflammable Shadow (aka Vermilion Sands II)"	6:27

== Personnel ==
Musicians

- Raoul Björkenheim – guitar
- Alex Buess – bass clarinet and contrabass clarinet on "An Early Mutation", "Blue Like Petrol" and "Ten Acre Ghost"; additional engineering and mixing
- Lol Coxhill – soprano saxophone on "Eight Legs Out of Limbo" and "Inflammable Shadow"
- Julian Priester – trombone on "The Big God Blows In" and "Eight Legs Out of Limbo"
- Bill Laswell – bass guitar
- Paul Schütze – keyboards, tape, sampler, production, engineering, mixing, design
- Dirk Wachtelaer – drums

Production and additional personnel

- Denis Blackham – mastering
- Anne-Louise Falsone – design
- Andrew Hulme – engineering
- Tsunehisa Kimura – photography
