= Isolationism (album) =

Ambient 4: Isolationism

Studio album by Various artists
- Released: 1994
- Genre: Dark ambient
- Label: Virgin/EMI

Various artists chronology
| Music of Changes (1994) | Ambient 4: Isolationism (1994) |

Professional ratings
Review scores
| Source | Rating |
|---|---|
| AllMusic | 4.5/5 stars |

Ambient 4: Isolationism is a 1994 studio album of new material by various ambient artists released on the Virgin Records label, part of its Ambient series. The compilation was issued as a double CD, packaged in a slimline case. It was compiled and features liner notes by Kevin Martin. It was the first in the series to be composed entirely of new, exclusive material.

== Background ==
The term "isolationism", in a musical context, was coined by British musician Kevin Martin and first appeared in print in a September 1993 issue of The Wire magazine. He described it as a form of fractured, subdued music that "pushed away" listeners.

James Plotkin identifies Brian Eno's ambient works as the greatest influence on the isolationist scene, along with American experimental music such as Illusion of Safety.

As Plotkin says,

I really didn't know what was meant by Isolationism [...], because it encompassed this broad spectrum of music that ranged from Ambient to avant garde music to even something more aggressive – like the Japanese Noise scene. [...] Isolationism was a Virgin compilation and it needed a marketing angle. And [compiler] Kevin Martin was definitely responsible for exposing a really large amount of people to music that would otherwise have gone unnoticed, so I guess it's not all bad.

== Track listing ==
=== CD 1 ===
1. KK Null & Jim Plotkin: "Lost (Held Under)"
2. Jim O'Rourke: "Flat Without A Back"
3. Ice: "The Dredger"
4. Raoul Björkenheim: "Strangers"
5. Zoviet France: "Daisy Gun"
6. Labradford: "Air Lubricated Free Axis Trainer"
7. Techno Animal: "Self Strangulation"
8. Paul Schütze: "Hallucinations (In Memory Of Reinaldo Arenas)"
9. Scorn: "Silver Rain Fell (Deep Water Mix)"
10. Disco Inferno: "Lost In Fog"
11. Total: "Six"
12. Nijiumu: "Once Again I Cast Myself Into The Flames Of Atonement"

=== CD 2 ===
1. Aphex Twin: "Aphex Airlines"
2. AMM: "Vandoevre"
3. Seefeel: "Lief"
4. .O.rang: "Little Sister"
5. E.A.R.: "Hydroponic"
6. Sufi: "Desert Flower"
7. David Toop & Max Eastley: "Burial Rites (Phosphorescent Mix)"
8. Main: "Crater Scar (Adrenochrome)"
9. Final: "Hide"
10. Lull: "Thoughts"
11. Thomas Köner: "Kanon (Part One: Brohuk)"
