= A Brief History of Ambient =

Ambient 1: A Brief History of Ambient

Compilation album by Various artists
- Released: 1993
- Genre: Ambient
- Label: Virgin
- Compiler: Simon Hopkins

Various artists chronology
Ambient 1: A Brief History of Ambient (1993)	Ambient 2: Imaginary Landscapes (1993)

Professional ratings
Review scores
Source	Rating
AllMusic	5/5 stars

Ambient 1: A Brief History of Ambient is a 1993 compilation album released on the Virgin Records label, as part of their Ambient series. The album was issued as a double CD, compiled by Simon Hopkins.

== Track listing ==
Source: Allmusic

Disc One
No.	Title	Performing Artist	Length
1.	"Flowered Knife Shadows"	Harold Budd	7:05
2.	"Thru Metamorphic Rock"	Tangerine Dream	9:46
3.	"Evening Star"	Robert Fripp & Brian Eno	7:31
4.	"Mountain Goat"	Amorphous Androgynous	4:28
5.	"Sea of Vapours"	Nusrat Fateh Ali Khan	3:50
6.	"The Forge of Vulcan"	Hawkwind	3:00
7.	"Requiem" (A Floating Leaf Always Reaches the Sea Dub Mix)	Killing Joke	10:35
8.	"An Ending (Ascent)"	Eno	4:11
9.	"Marnia's Tent"	Richard Horowitz	2:57
10.	"Rapido de Noir"	Irmin Schmidt & Bruno Spoerri	6:31
11.	"Kazoo"	Ashra	5:34
12.	"Their Memories"	Budd, Eno	2:43
13.	"Leave Your Body"	The Grid	4:45
14.	"Electric Becomes Eclectic"	Christopher Franke	3:38

Disc Two
No.	Title	Performing Artist	Length
1.	"Phaedra"	Tangerine Dream	10:25
2.	"Delta Rain Dream"	Jon Hassell & Eno	3:23
3.	"The Monkey King"	William Orbit	4:46
4.	"Castle in the Clouds"	Gong	1:04
5.	"Life Form"	Hawkwind	1:39
6.	"Dance #2"	Laraaji	9:08
7.	"Sacred Stones"	Sheila Chandra	5:21
8.	"Earth Floor"	Michael Brook	4:42
9.	"Läuft... Heißt Das Es Läuft Oder Es Kommt Bald... Läuft"	Faust	3:21
10.	"Gift of Fire"	Hassell	4:41
11.	"The End of Words"	Material	3:46
12.	"Panorphelia"	Edgar Froese	9:36
13.	"Voices"	Roger Eno	2:14
14.	"Träum Mal Wieder"	Holger Czukay	7:21
15.	"Home"	David Sylvian	4:15
