= Music of Changes (album) =

Ambient 3: Music of Changes

Compilation album by Various artists
- Released: 1994
- Genre: Ambient
- Label: Virgin

Various artists chronology
Imaginary Landscapes (1993)	Ambient 3: Music of Changes (1994)	Isolationism (1994)

Professional ratings
Review scores
Source	Rating
AllMusic	4/5 stars

Ambient 3: Music Of Changes is a 1994 compilation album released by Virgin Records as part of its Ambient series. The compilation was issued as a double CD.

== Track listing ==
=== CD 1 ===
1. Shu-De: "Sygyt, Khoomei, Kargyraa"
2. Irmin Schmidt & Bruno Spoerri: "When The Waters Came To Life"
3. David Sylvian & Robert Fripp: "Darshana (Remixed By The Future Sound Of London)"
4. William Orbit: "Gringatcho Demento"
5. Rain Tree Crow: "Red Earth (As Summertime Ends)"
6. Ryuichi Sakamoto: "The Last Emperor Theme Variation 1"
7. Robert Fripp: "1988"
8. David Sylvian: "Epiphany"
9. Amorphous Androgynous: "A Study Of Six Guitars"
10. Trisan: "May Yo l"
11. Bill Laswell: "Kingdom Come"
12. Seigen Ono: "You Will Be All Right"
13. Laraaji: "Meditation No. 2"
14. Bark Psychosis: "Pendulum Man"

=== CD 2 ===
1. Michael Brook: "Distant Village"
2. Holger Czukay, Jah Wobble & Jaki Liebezeit: "Mystery R.P.S. (No. 8)"
3. Prince Far I: "Throw Away Your Gun (Dub)"
4. Harold Budd, Brian Eno: "Wind In Lonely Fences"
5. King Crimson: "Nuages (That Which Passes, Passes Like Clouds)"
6. Nusrat Fateh Ali Khan: "Mustt Mustt"
7. Stephan Micus: "Concert For Gender, Shakuhachi And Zither (Edit)"
8. Robert Fripp, Brian Eno: "Healthy Colours lll"
9. The Future Sound of London: "Cascade-Parts 2 & 3"
10. Robert Quine, Fred Maher: "Summer Storm"
11. Jon Hassell, Brian Eno: "Rising Thermal"
12. David Sylvian, Holger Czukay: "Mutability (A New Beginning Is In The Offing) Edit"
13. Brian Eno: "2/2"
