= Isabelle Eberhardt (film) =

1991 film by Ian Pringle

- French theatrical film poster
- Directed by: Ian Pringle
- Written by: Stephen Sewell
- Produced by: Daniel Scharf; Jean Petit; Isabelle Fauvel
- Starring: Mathilda May; Peter O'Toole
- Cinematography: Manual Teran
- Music by: Paul Schütze
- Production companies: Les Films Aramis; Seon Films; Flach Films
- Distributed by: Palace Entertainment
- Release date: 1991
- Running time: 113 minutes
- Countries: Australia; France
- Language: English
- Box office: $14,323 (Australia)

Isabelle Eberhardt is a 1991 Australian-French biographical drama film directed by Ian Pringle. The film follows the adult life of Isabelle Eberhardt and was filmed in Algiers, Paris and Geneva. It stars Mathilda May as Eberhardt and Peter O'Toole as Hubert Lyautey. It received financial backing from the Film Finance Corporation Australia and was nominated for three awards at the 1991 Australian Film Institute Awards.

Isabelle Eberhardt was screened at the 1991 Melbourne International Film Festival and was also released in cinemas in Australia, though did not have a home media release. The film received generally negative reviews.

== Plot ==
Isabelle Eberhardt (Mathilda May) travels from North Africa to be with her father, who is dying in Geneva. Shortly after Eberhardt euthanises him, the wife of Marquis de Mores summons her to Paris. de Mores has disappeared in North Africa, and his wife wished to hire Eberhardt to track him down, as she is familiar with the region. Eberhardt arrives in Algiers, where she approaches newspaper publisher Victor Barrucand (Claude Villers). He is interested in her writing for his newspaper, though advises her to abandon the search for de Mores on the grounds it is hopeless. The French authorities are threatened by her search efforts and confront her about them. Despite that she has already come to the conclusion that de Mores is dead, the French garrison forbid her from traveling further from Algiers. Eberhardt falls in love with Slimene (Tchéky Karyo), a French Foreign Legion soldier, who arranges for her to travel out in secret.

Eberhardt is captured by a French patrol after witnessing them execute an Arab prisoner. A French military officer, Comte (Richard Moir), imprisons and abuses her. Eberhardt befriends an Arab prisoner named Sayed, who is later executed. Slimene reveals that Comte executed Sayed in the hopes of provoking a war. Eberhardt writes to Barrucand telling him everything; her story is printed as front-page news. Shortly thereafter Eberhardt is viciously attacked and wounded by an Arab swordsman. Eberhardt believes that Comte is responsible for the attack. At the conclusion of the sentencing of her attacker to life imprisonment, the French authorities deport Eberhardt. She moves to Marseille, where she is accompanied by Slimene the following year. The two get married, which allows Eberhardt to return to Algiers.

Eberhardt recommences working as a journalist for Barrucand. Her marriage begins to break down as Slimene does not want her to travel away from him. After reaching the outpost at Aïn Séfra, Eberhardt meets a French officer, General Hubert Lyautey (Peter O'Toole). Despite their differences, the two respect each other and soon become friends. Lyautey requests that Eberhardt travel to Morocco to ask a marabout for permission to pursue a bandit into his territory. Eberhardt is conflicted about working for the French, but agrees to do it. After arriving in Morocco, however, she finds the marabout unwilling to make time to see her, and she becomes sick with malaria while waiting. Eberhardt is taken to a military hospital back in Aïn Séfra. Slimene visits her, and Eberhardt asks him to take her with him. Slimene takes her back to his small hut, and returns in the heavy rain to get medicine for her. While he is out he realises Eberhardt will be in danger from the growing amount of water, but he does not make it back to the hut in time to save her. Inside her hut, Eberhardt realises she is in danger when it is too late and declares she wants to live an instant before a wall of water demolishes the house, killing her. Eberhardt reads the final paragraph from her short story "The Breath of Night" in a voice over, as images of the desert and water appear on screen.

== Themes ==
Writing in Australian Film 1978–1994, Raymond Younis attributed many themes to the film, saying it encompassed "the search for identity and the creative constitution of the self; the nature and role of the writer in a tumultuous world where values are compromised or surrendered; the issue of complicity in dishonourable political and military processes and in the brutality of colonisation; the paradox of tribal conflict among the indigenous people; the need for love and companionship; and the desire for oblivion under a sky which seems to be indifferent to the fate of such restless and tormented wanderers."

Writing in her 1999 book Feminism and Documentary, Diane Waldman said the film referred "only schematically to the complicated religious and political climate" in North Africa at the time, and no explanation was given for the Arabic reaction to Eberhardt's Arab persona. Waldman noted that costuming and make-up for the film highlighted Eberhart's femininity, showing her in profile so that her breasts appear beneath her robes and portraying her as wearing lipstick and eye make-up in the desert, something that Eberhardt would not have done.

== Production ==
Isabelle Eberhardt was a joint French and Australian project. The Film Finance Corporation Australia invested $1.9 million towards the film's production. It was shot on 35mm film and filmed in Algiers, Paris and Geneva. Ian Pringle said he read about the life of Isabelle Eberhardt about ten years prior to filming, and was fascinated and intrigued by her. Pringle said for him production was both exciting and sad. Exciting because he was finally telling her story, though sad because as filming progressed he realised no film about her life would do her justice. Salacious sex scenes which "read like erotic fiction" in the script were shot but not used in the final cut of the film.

=== Music ===
Paul Schütze was commissioned to compose the music for the film. Tracks were recorded in 1990. Schütz released the tracks on 1 January 1994 on an album entitled Isabelle Eberhardt: The Oblivion Seeker. Schütz stated he worked with three styles of music for the album: "Romantic European style melodic pieces for the world Isabelle leaves but which never really releases its grip upon her, stylised pieces with a strong Arab flavour which link her to her beloved desert, and pieces in which the two elements conflict to mirror the heart of her dilemma." The album included several pieces of music which were not actually featured in the film.

William Tilland from AllMusic gave the album four out of five stars, saying the "music slips back and forth between European romanticism and a restrained ethnic exoticism which includes touches of synthesized Middle Eastern oud and modal scales. Several pieces combine the two elements in an ambivalent, unresolved fashion, suggesting the tension that exists in the life and mind of the film's principal character", concluding the album is "a rich and majestic piece of work."

== Release ==
The film was shown at the Melbourne International Film Festival in 1991 and the Verona Film Festival in 1992. It grossed $14,323 at the box-office in Australia. Australian Film 1978–1994, published in 1996, stated the film had not yet been given a home media release.

=== Critical reception ===
Josh Ralske from AllMovie gave the film 1½ out of 5 stars, saying it was "a flawed docudrama" though due to Eberhardt being such a fascinating character the film was still interesting. He concluded "unfortunately, the film is not quite good enough to recommend to those who aren't familiar with Isabelle Eberhardt's life and work, and those who are familiar with her are likely to be disappointed." Fabienne Pascaud from Télérama gave a scathing review, advising fans of Eberhardt to avoid the film, saying it was flat and silly and filled with ridiculous and unbelievable scenes.

Younis called the film a "hodgepodge", saying it lurched from "one sub-plot to another, while the really interesting material is submerged for significant periods". He praised the film's cinematography and art direction, though concluded the film "undercuts the figure who most represented the creative individual. Somewhere in this meandering film there is a fascinating story about a fascinating person that deserves to be told in more coherent and cogent terms."

=== Accolades ===
Isabelle Eberhardt received three nominations at the 1991 Australian Film Institute Awards.

Year	Event	Award	Nominee	Result
1991	Australian Film Institute Awards	Best Sound in a Feature Film	Bernard Aubouy, Dean Gawen, Roger Savage	Nominated
1991	Australian Film Institute Awards	Production Design Feature	Bryce Perrin, Geoffrey Larcher	Nominated
1991	Australian Film Institute Awards	Best Achievement in Costume Design	Mic Cheminal	Nominated
