= Vertical Memory =

Studio album by Seed
- Released: 1995
- Genre: Ambient
- Length: 54:58
- Label: Beyond
- Producer: Paul Schütze

Paul Schütze chronology
Apart (1995)	Vertical Memory (1995)	Site Anubis (1996)

Vertical Memory is the eighth album by composer Paul Schütze, released in 1995 through Beyond Records. It was released under the pseudonym Seed.

Professional ratings
Review scores
Source	Rating
Muzik	4/5 stars

== Track listing ==
All music is composed by Paul Schütze

No.	Title	Length
1.	"Sight Wave Relock"	2:22
2.	"One Armed Sun Ascending"	4:30
3.	"The Luxury of Horns"	7:36
4.	"900 Ghosts"	3:03
5.	"The Alteration"	6:35
6.	"Eliptical Twilight"	4:53
7.	"Falling Bodies Alight"	5:08
8.	"Codex Bast"	5:17
9.	"Entropic Appetites"	5:37
10.	"Air"	9:57

== Personnel ==
- Denis Blackham – mastering
- Anne-Louise Falsone – design
- Andrew Hulme – engineering
- Paul Schütze – instruments, production
