= Nine Songs =

Nine Songs or 9 Songs may refer to:

== Arts and entertainment ==
=== Film ===
- 9 Songs, a 2004 British art romantic drama film written and directed by Michael Winterbottom

=== Literature ===
- Jiu Ge (Nine Songs), a set of Chinese poems written in the 3rd century BC

=== Music ===
==== Classical music ====
- Nine Songs, a composition with opus number 69 by Johannes Brahms
- Romances and Songs (Nine Songs), a composition with opus number 18 by Edvard Grieg
- Liederkreis, Op. 24 (sometimes titled with "9 songs for voice & piano"), a composition by Robert Schumann
- 9 Songs, a composition with opus number 60 by Max Bruch

==== Contemporary music ====
- Nine Songs From the Garden of Welcome Lies, a 1997 album by composer Paul Schütze
