= New Maps of Hell =

New Maps of Hell may refer to:

- New Maps of Hell (Paul Schütze album), 1992
- New Maps of Hell (Bad Religion album), 2007
- New Maps of Hell: A Survey of Science Fiction, a 1960 book by Kingsley Amis
