= The Annihilating Angel; or, The Surface of the World =

The Annihilating Angel

Studio album by Paul Schütze
- Released: 1990
- Recorded: January – June 1990 at Absolute Studio and Soundfirm Melbourne, Australia
- Genre: Jazz fusion, electronic
- Length: 46:27
- Label: Extreme
- Producer: Paul Schütze

Paul Schütze chronology
| Deus Ex Machina (1989) | The Annihilating Angel (1990) | Regard: Music by Film (1991) |

Professional ratings
Review scores
| Source | Rating |
|---|---|
| Allmusic | 4.5/5 stars |

The Annihilating Angel; Or, The Surface of the World is the second album by composer Paul Schütze, released in 1990 through Extreme Records.

== Track listing ==
All tracks are written by Paul Schütze

| No. | Title | Length |
|---|---|---|
| 1. | "Cities of the Plain" | 4:25 |
| 2. | "Loss & The Hand Lense" | 4:22 |
| 3. | "The Falls" | 3:02 |
| 4. | "The Torture Garden" | 6:26 |
| 5. | "The Fatal Muse" | 3:20 |
| 6. | "Reign of Ashes" | 6:26 |
| 7. | "Dead Roads" | 4:00 |
| 8. | "The Pressure of the Text" | 3:15 |
| 9. | "Trance Militant" | 4:42 |
| 10. | "The Tears of Eros" | 2:13 |
| 11. | "Cities of the Red Night" | 4:16 |

== Personnel ==
- John Baldwin – illustrations
- Steve Burgess – engineering
- Sandro Donnadi – trumpet
- Tom Fryer – guitar
- Philip Jackson – illustrations
- Judy Jacques – voice
- Jeff Jeffers – voice
- Sam Mallet – voice
- Paul Schütze – keyboards, percussion, programming, production
- Melissa Webb – illustrations
