= Horizon (British magazine) =

UK literary magazine published from 1939 to 1950

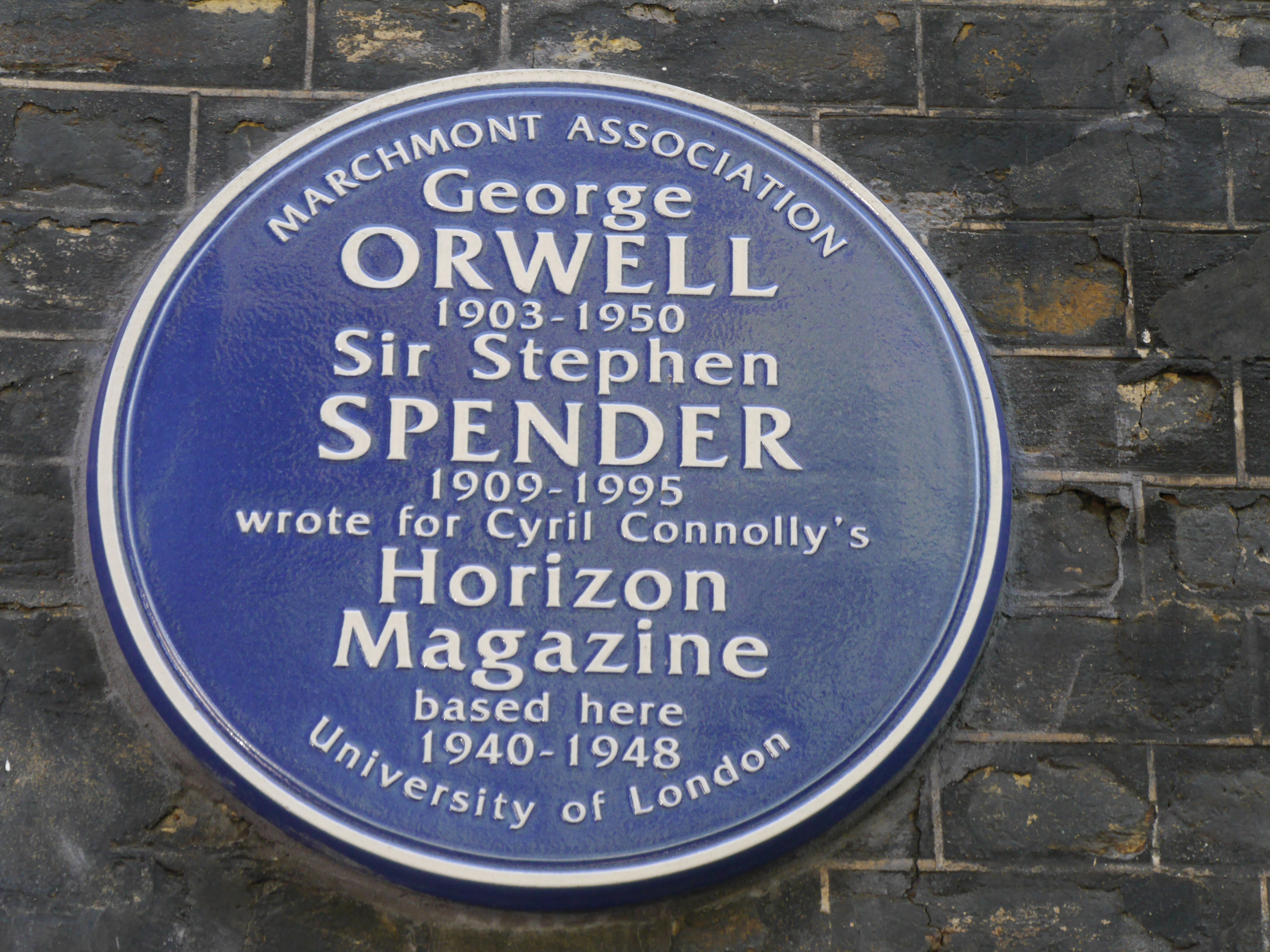
Plaque in Lansdowne Terrace

Horizon: A Review of Literature and Art was a literary magazine published in London, UK, between December 1939 and January 1950. Published every four weeks, it was edited by Cyril Connolly, who made it into a platform for a wide range of distinguished and emerging writers. It had a print run of 120 issues or 20 volumes.

Connolly founded Horizon after T. S. Eliot ended The Criterion in January 1939, with Peter Watson as its financial backer and de facto art editor. Connolly was editor throughout its publication and Stephen Spender was an uncredited associate editor until early 1941. Connolly described the magazine's goal during World War II as

encouraging the young writers-at-arms who seem to find the need to write more irresistible as the War progresses, keeping them in touch with their French and American contemporaries—in short, continuing our policy of publishing the best critical and creative writing we can find in wartime England and maintaining the continuity of the present with the past.

The magazine had a small circulation of around 9,500, but an impressive list of contributors, and it made a significant impact on the arts during and just after the war. Connolly issued an all-Irish number in 1941, an all-Swiss number in 1946 and a U. S. number in October 1947. There was also a French issue and one comprising The Loved One, the novel by Evelyn Waugh.

Paul Fussell praised Horizon as "one of the most civilized and civilizing of periodicals ... with material of almost unbelievable excellence". He described it as "Around 10,000 pages of exquisite poetry and prose and art reproductions, produced and read in the midst of the most discouraging and terrible destruction ... one of the high moments in the long history of British eccentricity". Waugh was less positive, telling Connolly that he heard "an ugly accent—RAF pansy" from the magazine. He twice satirized Connolly and Horizon, as Ambrose Silk and Ivory Tower in Put Out More Flags, and Everard Spruce and Survival in Sword of Honour. Spruce, like Connolly, was the editor of a literary review, liked good food and parties, and was surrounded by helpful young ladies. Two of the women at the magazine were Clarissa Eden and Sonia Brownell, and Brownell met author George Orwell (whose real name was Eric Blair) through Horizon and later married him.

== Selected list of contributors ==
Contributors included:

- Gerald Abraham
- Jankel Adler
- Louis Aragon
- W. H. Auden
- A. J. Ayer
- John Banting
- George Barker
- Arturo Barea
- Béla Bartók
- Cecil Beaton
- John Betjeman
- Alexander Blok
- Paul Bowles
- C. M. Bowra
- Arthur Calder-Marshall
- Kenneth Clark
- Robert Colquhoun
- John Craxton
- Benedetto Croce
- R. H. Crossman
- Nancy Cunard
- Rhys Davies
- Cecil Day-Lewis
- Paul Brooks Davis
- Lawrence Durrell
- T. S. Eliot
- Paul Eluard
- William Empson
- Gavin Ewart
- Ian Fleming
- E. M. Forster
- Lucian Freud
- J. F. C. Fuller
- Roy Fuller
- David Gascoyne
- André Gide
- W. S. Graham
- G. F. Green
- Graham Greene
- Philip Hendy
- Barbara Hepworth
- Hermann Hesse
- Terence Heywood
- Brian Howard
- Aldous Huxley
- Robin Ironside
- Christopher Isherwood
- Randall Jarrell
- Augustus John
- Mervyn Jones-Evan
- Pierre Jean Jouve
- Anna Kavan
- Paul Klee
- Arthur Koestler
- Philip Lamantia
- Osbert Lancaster
- Alun Lewis
- James Lord (author)
- Rose Macaulay
- Cecily Mackworth
- Julian MacLaren-Ross
- Louis MacNeice
- Olivia Manning
- Rosemary Manning
- André Masson
- Robert Melville
- Henry Miller
- Nancy Mitford
- Henry Moore
- Alan Moorehead
- Paul Nash
- Ben Nicholson
- Sean O'Faolain
- George Orwell
- Jean Paulhan
- John Piper
- William Plomer
- John Pope-Hennessy
- J. B. Priestley
- Peter Quennell
- Kathleen Raine
- Herbert Read
- Edouard Roditi
- John Rothenstein
- Bertrand Russell
- Vita Sackville-West
- William Sansom
- Jean-Paul Sartre
- Osbert Sitwell
- Logan Pearsall Smith
- Stephen Spender
- Enid Starkie
- Wallace Stevens
- G. W. Stonier
- Graham Sutherland
- A. J. A. Symons
- Dylan Thomas
- Peter Ustinov
- John Waller
- Vernon Watkins
- Denton Welch
- H. G. Wells
- Eudora Welty
- Patrick White
- Diana Witherby
- Rollo Woolley
- Virginia Woolf
- Beryl de Zoete
