= The Surgery of Touch =

Studio album by Paul Schütze
- Released: October 1994
- Genre: Ambient
- Length: 69:22
- Label: Sentrax; Tone Casualties
- Producer: Paul Schütze

Paul Schütze chronology
More Beautiful Human Life! (1994)	The Surgery of Touch (1994)	Apart (1995)

Professional ratings
Review scores
Source	Rating
Allmusic	4/5 stars

The Surgery of Touch is the sixth album by composer Paul Schütze, released in 1994 through Sentrax.

== Track listing ==
All tracks are written by Paul Schütze

No.	Title	Length
1.	"Tears"	24:09
2.	"Sweat"	18:38
3.	"Blood"	26:35

== Personnel ==
- Denis Blackham – mastering
- Paul McDermott – painting
- Paul Schütze – instruments, production
- Jörg Willich – design
