= Imaginary Landscapes =

Ambient 2: Imaginary Landscapes

Compilation album by Various artists
- Released: 1993
- Genre: Ambient
- Label: Virgin

Various artists chronology
Ambient 1: A Brief History of Ambient (1993)	Ambient 2: Imaginary Landscapes (1993)	Ambient 3: Music Of Changes (1994)

Professional ratings
Review scores
Source	Rating
AllMusic	4.5/5 stars

Ambient 2: Imaginary Landscapes is a 1993 compilation album released by Virgin Records as part of its Ambient series. The compilation was issued as a double CD.

== Track listing ==
Disc one
No.	Title	Performing artist	Length
1.	"Call to Prayer"	Baaba Maal	3:52
2.	"Tal Coat"	Brian Eno	5:06
3.	"In Mind"	Amorphous Androgynous	5:26
4.	"Rubycon, Pt. 2" (Edit)	Tangerine Dream	6:32
5.	"The Healing Place"	David Sylvian	5:16
6.	"Crystal Clear" (The Orb Remix: Clear, Like An Unmuddied Lake)	The Grid	6:12
7.	"Nuages"	Ryuichi Sakamoto	2:08
8.	"Wind on Water"	Fripp/Eno	5:15
9.	"Wildlife"	Penguin Cafe Orchestra	8:11
10.	"When Things Dream"	Jansen/Barbieri	2:39
11.	"Magick Mother Invocation"	Allen, Gong	1:33
12.	"Bringing Down the Light"	Sylvian/Fripp	8:14
13.	"Not Another"	Jah Wobble	3:12
14.	"One Flower"	The Guo Brothers & Shung Tian	1:31
15.	"Black Jesus"	God	6:34
16.	"Mountain of Needles"	Eno/Byrne	2:33

Disc two
No.	Title	Performing artist	Length
1.	"You Are Here"	Phil Manzanera	1:46
2.	"Bendel Dub"	Prince Far I	3:05
3.	"Slow Kaliuki" (Edit)	The Dimitri Pokrovsky Ensemble	0:29
4.	"Euterpe Gratitude Piece"	Daevid Allen	9:21
5.	"Water Music"	Robert Fripp	1:16
6.	"New Moon at Red Deer Wallow"	Rain Tree Crow	5:01
7.	"Attack of the 50 Foot Drum Demon"	Bass-O-Matic	4:14
8.	"Mekong"	Jam Nation	5:09
9.	"Endless Life"	The Verve	5:15
10.	"Nachtmusik Schattenhaft"	Klaus Schulze	6:31
11.	"Arrival" (Edit)	Voyager	7:14
12.	"Specific Gravity of Smile"	Edgar Froese	9:29
13.	"Orovela"	The Tsinandali Choir	4:54
14.	"Dance #3"	Laraaji	3:02
15.	"Premonition (Giant Empty Iron Vessel)"	Sylvian/Czukay	6:37
16.	"Island"	The Edge	6:37
