= Nine Songs from the Garden of Welcome Lies =

Nine Songs From the Garden of Welcome Lies

Studio album by Paul Schütze
- Released: September 9, 1997
- Recorded: 1996 at St. Karl Church, St. Moritz and Wolff 2.8.1. Studio, Basel, Switzerland
- Genre: Electronic
- Length: 52:26
- Label: Tone Casualties
- Producer: Paul Schütze

Paul Schütze chronology
Shiva Recoil: Live/Unlive (1997)	Nine Songs From the Garden of Welcome Lies (1997)	Second Site: 27°37'35" N 77°13'05" E (1997)

Professional ratings
Review scores
Source	Rating
Allmusic	4/5 stars

Nine Songs From the Garden of Welcome Lies is the tenth album by composer Paul Schütze, released on September 9, 1997 through Tone Casualties.

== Track listing ==
All music is composed by Paul Schütze

Improvisations for Organ and Percussion
No.	Title	Length
1.	"Song One"	2:47
2.	"Song Three"	8:16
3.	"Song Eight"	6:16
4.	"Song Six"	4:45
5.	"Song Nine"	2:18
6.	"Song Four"	6:30
7.	"Song Five"	6:02
8.	"Song Two"	3:27
9.	"Song Seven"	12:06

== Personnel ==
- Alex Buess – engineering, mixing, recording
- Andrew Hulme – engineering
- Jürg Jecklin – recording
- Christian Lichtenberg – design, photography
- Paul Schütze – instruments, production, engineering, mixing
