= Deus Ex Machina (Paul Schütze album) =

Studio album by Paul Schütze
- Released: 1989
- Recorded: 1989
- Genre: Electronic; sound collage
- Length: 59:00
- Label: Extreme
- Producer: Paul Schütze

Paul Schütze chronology
Deus Ex Machina (1989)	The Annihilating Angel (1990)

Professional ratings
Review scores
Source	Rating
Allmusic	4.5/5 stars

Deus Ex Machina is the debut album of composer Paul Schütze, released in 1989 through Extreme Records.

== Track listing ==
All music is composed by Paul Schütze

No.	Title	Length
1.	"Deus Ex Machina"	59:00

== Personnel ==
- John Baldwin – illustrations
- Steve Burgess – instruments, engineering
- Paul Schütze – instruments, production, art direction
- Virginia Trioli – vocals
- Gareth Vanderhope – instruments
- Melissa Webb – art direction
