= More Beautiful Human Life! =

The Rapture of Metals

Studio album by Uzect Plaush
- Released: August 1994
- Recorded: Absolute Studio
- Genre: Ambient
- Length: 50:03
- Label: Apollo
- Producer: Paul Schütze

Paul Schütze chronology
Isabelle Eberhardt: The Oblivion Seeker (1994)	The Rapture of Metals (1994)	The Surgery of Touch (1994)

Professional ratings
Review scores
Source	Rating
AllMusic	3/5 stars

More Beautiful Human Life! is the fifth album by composer Paul Schütze, released in 1994 through Apollo Records. It was released under the pseudonym Uzect Plaush, which is actually an anagram of Paul Schutze.

== Track listing ==
All tracks are written by Paul Schütze.

No.	Title	Length
1.	"Violet Cell Edit"	1:47
2.	"Wind From Nowhere"	5:49
3.	"Wetzone Rapture"	7:14
4.	"The Falling Dream"	7:25
5.	"Auto Radia"	9:43
6.	"A Boiling Horizon"	1:25
7.	"Discrete Global"	7:08
8.	"The Sky Rolled Back"	9:41

== Personnel ==
- Denis Blackham – mastering
- Andrew Hulme – engineering
- Jane Joyce – design
- Adam Routh – engineering
- Paul Schütze – instruments, production
