= The Rapture of Metals =

Studio album by Paul Schütze
- Released: 1993
- Genre: Ambient
- Length: 62:14
- Label: SDV Tonträger; Big Cat UK
- Producer: Paul Schütze

Paul Schütze chronology
New Maps of Hell (1992)	The Rapture of Metals (1993)	Isabelle Eberhardt: The Oblivion Seeker (1994)

Professional ratings
Review scores
Source	Rating
Allmusic	4.5/5 stars
Muzik	4.5/5 stars

The Rapture of Metals (later released as New Maps of Hell II) is the fourth album by composer Paul Schütze, released in 1993 through SDV Tonträger.

== Track listing ==
All tracks are written by Paul Schütze

No.	Title	Length
1.	"The Rapture of Concealment"	7:22
2.	"The Rapture of The Drowning"	9:13
3.	"The Rapture of Ornament"	6:03
4.	"The Rapture of Metals"	7:06
5.	"The Rapture of the Skin"	11:11
6.	"Sites of Rapture on the Lungs of God"	21:19

== Personnel ==
- Denis Blackham – mastering
- Frazer Henry – engineering
- Paul Schütze – instruments, production
- Jörg Willich – design
