= Abysmal Evenings =

Studio album by Paul Schütze
- Released: 1996
- Genre: Ambient
- Length: 59:25
- Label: Virgin
- Producer: Paul Schütze

Paul Schütze chronology
Fell (1996)	Abysmal Evenings (1996)	Shiva Recoil: Live/Unlive (1997)

Professional ratings
Review scores
Source	Rating
Muzik	4/5 stars

Abysmal Evenings is the ninth album by composer Paul Schütze, released in 1996 through Virgin Records.

== Track listing ==
All music is composed by Paul Schütze

No.	Title	Length
1.	"Red Hand"	3:12
2.	"Slow Burning Ghosts"	8:52
3.	"The Close Heat Of Starlight"	9:42
4.	"Font"	3:43
5.	"Abysmal Evenings"	5:36
6.	"The Lotus Voltage"	6:43
7.	"Delta Haze"	6:47
8.	"A Night Dissolved in the Lakes of Heaven"	14:50

== Personnel ==
- Denis Blackham – mastering
- Anne-Louise Falsone – design
- Robert Hampson – guitar
- Andrew Hulme – engineering
- Ben Neill – trumpet
- Paul Schütze – instruments, production, design
