= Regard: Music by Film =

Compilation album by Paul Schütze
- Released: 1991
- Genre: Electronic
- Length: 67:04
- Label: Extreme
- Producer: Paul Schütze

Paul Schütze chronology
The Annihilating Angel (1990)	Regard: Music by Film (1991)	New Maps of Hell (1992)

Professional ratings
Review scores
Source	Rating
Allmusic	4.5/5 stars

Regard: Music by Film is a compilation of film scores by composer Paul Schütze, released in 1991 through Extreme Records.

== Track listing ==
All tracks are written by Paul Schütze

No.	Title	Length
1.	"Tiga"	7:13

from The Tale of Ruby Rose
No.	Title	Length
2.	"The Dark"	3:17
3.	"The Walls"	1:52
4.	"Scourging"	1:47
5.	"Henry's Plans"	1:47
6.	"Timeless"	1:13
7.	"The Past Invented"	1:52
8.	"Lakes and Plans"	2:42
9.	"Remaking a World"	2:05
10.	"A Phantom Barrier"	1:25
11.	"Untrodden Path"	2:19
12.	"Born by Clouds"	1:46
13.	"Lives Contained"	3:04
14.	"In the Absence of Angels"	6:04

from The Last Forests
No.	Title	Length
15.	"Frozen Descent"	2:36
16.	"The Green Cathedral"	2:54
17.	"Time Arrested"	2:33
18.	"Within the Floor"	1:45
19.	"And All the Moon"	1:36
20.	"The Company of Geometry"	2:22
21.	"The Ash Plan"	3:48

remixed excerpt from D.E.M.
No.	Title	Length
22.	"Shark Sex"	10:32

== Personnel ==
- Paul Schütze – instruments, production
- Frank Lipson – mastering
