= Cecily Mackworth =

- Born: Cecily Joan Mackworth; 15 August 1911; Llantilio Pertholey, Monmouthshire, Wales, UK
- Died: 22 July 2006 (aged 94); Paris, France
- Occupations: Writer, explorer
- Spouse(s): Leon Donckier de Donceel (1935-1938), Marquis de Chabannes La Palice (1956-1980)
- Children: Pascale Léonie Juliette Donckier de Donceel
- Writing career
- Pen name: Cecily Mackworth

Cecily Joan Mackworth (15 August 1911 – 22 July 2006) was a Welsh writer, journalist, poet and explorer.

== Early life ==
Cecily Joan Mackworth was born on 15 August 1911 in Llantilio Pertholey, Monmouthshire, to an illustrious and well-connected Welsh military family. Her great-grandfather Sir Digby Mackworth, an officer in Wellington's army, married Julie de Richepense, the daughter of one of Napoleon's generals. Her aunt Margaret Mackworth, later Haig Thomas, 2nd Viscountess Rhondda, was an editor of the newspaper Time and Tide. Her father, Francis Julian Audley Mackworth (1876–1914), a captain in the British Army, was killed early in World War I. Her mother was the former Dorothy Conran Lascelles (1883-1976).

After being widowed her mother, moved to Sidmouth, Devon, with she and her younger sister Helen Margaret Mackworth (1914–1938). When her mother remarried to Charles Edward Gatehouse, Mackworth moved to Sidmouth and she subsequently studied at the London School of Economics, where her aunt Margaret was later a governor. She successfully undertook a two-year course in journalism. A close friend there was the economist Nicholas Kaldor.

== Marriages ==
After leaving LSE, Mackworth spent much of the next two decades traveling. She married Leon Donckier de Donceel, a Belgian lawyer, at the age of 22 after meeting him in a Swiss sanitarium. The couple had one daughter before he died three years into their marriage. The same year her younger sister committed suicide at age 24.

She spent time in Hungary and Germany, witnessing the burning of the Reichstag in 1933, before settling in Paris in 1936. Forced to flee Paris in 1940, she worked briefly for the Free Frenchin London during the war, in addition to giving lectures to the army and writing for Cyril Connolly's literary magazine Horizon. While in London she became familiar with a number of contemporary writers, including T.S. Eliot, who admired an early book of hers detailing her recent flight from France. In one notable incident during this time, Dylan Thomas' wife, Caitlin, stubbed a cigarette out on Mackworth's hand, on the grounds that Mackworth was acting too intimately with her husband at a party. She returned to Paris after the war, but traveled widely, including to Palestine in 1948, and to Algeria in 1950, following the path of Isabelle Eberhardt.

In 1956 she married again, to the French aristocrat Marquis de Chabannes La Palice. The two were married until his death in 1980.

== Work ==
Mackworth's first book, Eleven Poems, was published by Henry Miller in 1938. Her first major success detailed her escape from France in front of the Nazi advance, and route through Spain and Portugal to London, I Came out of France (1941). After the war she wrote studies on the poets Francois Villon (in 1947) and Guillaume Apollinaire (in 1967). She was one of two female journalists working in Palestine at the time of the birth of Israel, and published a book about the experience, The Mouth of the Sword, in 1949. Her book about Isabelle Eberhardt, based on her travels in the region Eberhardt had lived earlier, The Destiny of Isabelle Eberhardt, was published in 1954. She also published two novels, Spring's Green Shadow (1952) and Lucy's Nose (1992) about Freud's patient Lucy R, as well as two volumes of autobiography, Ends of the World (1987) and Out of the Black Mountains, the latter completed weeks before her death in 2006. Spring's Green Shadow was republished by Honno Welsh Women's Press in 2022; Lucy's Nose in 2026 with an introduction by Ann Heilman.

She died at 94, on 22 July in Paris.
