= New Maps of Hell (Paul Schütze album) =

Studio album by Paul Schütze
- Released: 1992
- Recorded: Absolute Studios and A.B.C. Studio 325., Melbourne, Australia
- Genre: Jazz fusion, ambient
- Length: 52:42 (original release); 53:24 (1996 re-issue)
- Label: Extreme; Big Cat UK
- Producer: Paul Schütze

Paul Schütze chronology
Regard: Music by Film (1991)	New Maps of Hell (1992)	The Rapture of Metals (1993)

Professional ratings
Review scores
Source	Rating
Allmusic	4/5 stars
Muzik	3/5 stars

New Maps of Hell is the third album by composer Paul Schütze, released in 1992 through Extreme Records.

== Track listing ==
All tracks are written by Paul Schütze

No.	Title	Length
1.	"The Eraser"	2:31
2.	"Topology of a Phantom City"	16:31
3.	"The Velvet Horizon"	6:13
4.	"Eating the First Map"	2:13
5.	"Sacred Agents"	7:14
6.	"Doubts About Waking"	4:48
7.	"The Mutant Beautific"	3:37
8.	"A Soul Reports"	9:36

1996 re-issue
No.	Title	Length
1.	"The Eraser"	2:31
2.	"Topology of a Phantom City"	16:31
3.	"The Velvet Horizon"	6:13
4.	"Eating the First Map"	2:13
5.	"Sacred Agents"	7:14
6.	"Doubts About Waking"	4:48
7.	"The Mutant Beautific"	3:37
8.	"All That Was Solid..."	10:18

== Personnel ==
Musicians

- Simone De Haan – trombone
- Peter Jones – drums
- Frank Lipson – digital media
- Bill McDonald – bass guitar
- Peter Neville – percussion
- Paul Schütze – keyboards, percussion, engineering, production
- Mark Stafford – guitar
- François Tétaz – percussion
- Gareth Vanderhope – effects

Production and additional personnel

- Craig Carter – recording
- Richard Grant – illustrations, design
- Garry Havrillay – engineering, mastering
