= Isabelle Eberhardt: The Oblivion Seeker =

Soundtrack album by Paul Schütze
- Released: April 1994
- Genre: Ambient
- Length: 67:25
- Labels: SDV Tonträger; Tone Casualties
- Producer: Paul Schütze

Paul Schütze chronology
The Rapture of Metals (1993)	Isabelle Eberhardt: The Oblivion Seeker (1994)	More Beautiful Human Life! (1994)

Professional ratings
Review scores
Source	Rating
Allmusic	4/5 stars

Isabelle Eberhardt: The Oblivion Seeker is a soundtrack album by the ambient composer Paul Schütze, released in 1994 through SDV Tonträger. The music was composed for the 1991 Australian film Isabelle Eberhardt directed by Ian Pringle.

== Track listing ==
All tracks are written by Paul Schütze.

No.	Title	Length
1.	"Ocean Dust"	2:19
2.	"Wings & The Demon"	3:39
3.	"Smoldering Skies"	3:48
4.	"Slimen"	4:03
5.	"A Death in the Dark"	2:01
6.	"By Waters to Night"	2:09
7.	"Tombs & Deceptions"	3:18
8.	"The Ghost of Paris"	2:16
9.	"Chasing the Veil"	3:13
10.	"A Phantom Wedding"	2:19
11.	"Into a Hiding Place"	2:21
12.	"The Lake on the Air"	2:38
13.	"A Gun & The Moon"	2:28
14.	"Oblivion"	1:46
15.	"Despair"	3:37
16.	"A Heart of Air & Tears"	4:17

== Personnel ==
- Paul Schütze – instruments, production
- Jörg Willich – design
