= Nella Bielski =

Ukrainian-born French writer and actress (died 2020)

Nella Bielski (1930s – 4 November 2020) was a Ukrainian-born French writer and actress.

Bielski was born in Ukraine in the Soviet Union in the 1930s and died on 4 November 2020 in Antony a suburb of Paris. She studied philosophy at Moscow State University. In the early 1960s she met a French journalist, married him and was allowed to leave the Soviet Union for France.

Bielski acted in films. In 1970 her first novel Voronej appeared in French. After that she wrote a number of novels, also translated into English, including Oranges for the Son of Alexander Levy and The Year is '42.

She collaborated on a number of plays with one of her regular English translators John Berger, including A Question of Geography, which was performed by the Royal Shakespeare Company.
