= Apart (album) =

Studio album by Paul Schütze
- Released: 1995
- Recorded: November 1994 in London, England
- Genre: Ambient
- Length: 97:28
- Label: Virgin
- Producer: Paul Schütze

Paul Schütze chronology
The Surgery of Touch (1994)	Apart (1995)	Vertical Memory (1995)

Professional ratings
Review scores
Source	Rating
Allmusic	4.5/5 stars

Apart is the seventh album by composer Paul Schütze, released in 1995 through Virgin Records.

== Track listing ==
All music is composed by Paul Schütze

Disc one
No.	Title	Length
1.	"Rivers of Mercury"	6:45
2.	"A Skin of Air & Tears"	6:14
3.	"The Sleeping Knife Dance"	4:46
4.	"Visions of a Sand Drinker"	4:50
5.	"The Coldest Light"	4:04
6.	"Eyeless & Naked"	4:56
7.	"The Ghosts of Animals"	4:43
8.	"Taken (Apart)"	3:04
9.	"Consequence"	4:28
10.	"The Memory of Water Pt II"	6:12

Disc two
No.	Title	Length
1.	"Throat Full of Stars"	5:50
2.	"Sleep I"	14:24
3.	"Sleep II"	8:25
4.	"Sleep III"	18:47

== Personnel ==
- Denis Blackham – engineering, mastering
- Richard Misrach – photography
- Paul Schütze – instruments, production, recording
