= Kvalda =

Kvalda is a Finnish jazz quartet. The members of the band are singer Aili Ikonen, pianist Antti Kujanpää, double bass player Jori Huhtala and drummer Hanne Pulli. Kvalda's music has been described as "Nordic", and is influenced by traditional music.

Kvalda was formed in Jyväskylä in the autumn of 2002 on Kujanpää's initiative. At that time, all the band's members were studying at the conservatory of Jyväskylä College. Another common factor for them was Jazz Bar (a.k.a. Poppari), a music club in Jyväskylä: Ikonen, Huhtala and Pulli were active participants in children's jam sessions arranged in Jazz Bar. The club later designated Kujanpää, Pulli and Ikonen as the musicians of the year and Huhtala as the newcomer of the year.

Kvalda's debut album Kvalda was published at Jyväskylä Summer Jazz festival on June 12, 2004. The album was recorded in Jyväskylä College's studio in May 2003 and March 2004. The songs on the album are composed by Ikonen, Kujanpää and Huhtala.

In May 2004 Kvalda won the Finnish preselection of the Young Nordic Jazz Comets band contest held in Umo Jazz House in Helsinki. They received a Renault Jazz Award and reached the finals of the contest, which was held in Stockholm in July of the same year. The band won the finals and started a concert tour in the Nordic countries.

The members of Kvalda have later moved to Helsinki to continue their musical studies: Kujanpää and Huhtala study in the jazz music department of the Sibelius Academy, Ikonen studies in the department of folk music and Pulli studies in the department of pop and jazz music of the Helsinki Polytechnic Stadia. Kvalda's second album, Leia, was published by Texicalli Records in October 2007. All the band members have contributed songs to the album.

Kvalda has performed on several jazz festivals in Finland. In spring 2005, they were on a concert tour in Finland arranged by Finnish Jazz Federation. In addition, the band had concerts in the Northern countries, the Netherlands, the Czech Republic, Greece, and Germany. The members of Kvalda play also in many other musical groups.

== Discography ==
- Kvalda (self-published, 2004)
- Leia (Texicalli, 2007)
- Blindfold (Kuu Records, 2011)
