= Bruno Spoerri =

Swiss jazz and electronics musician (born 1935)

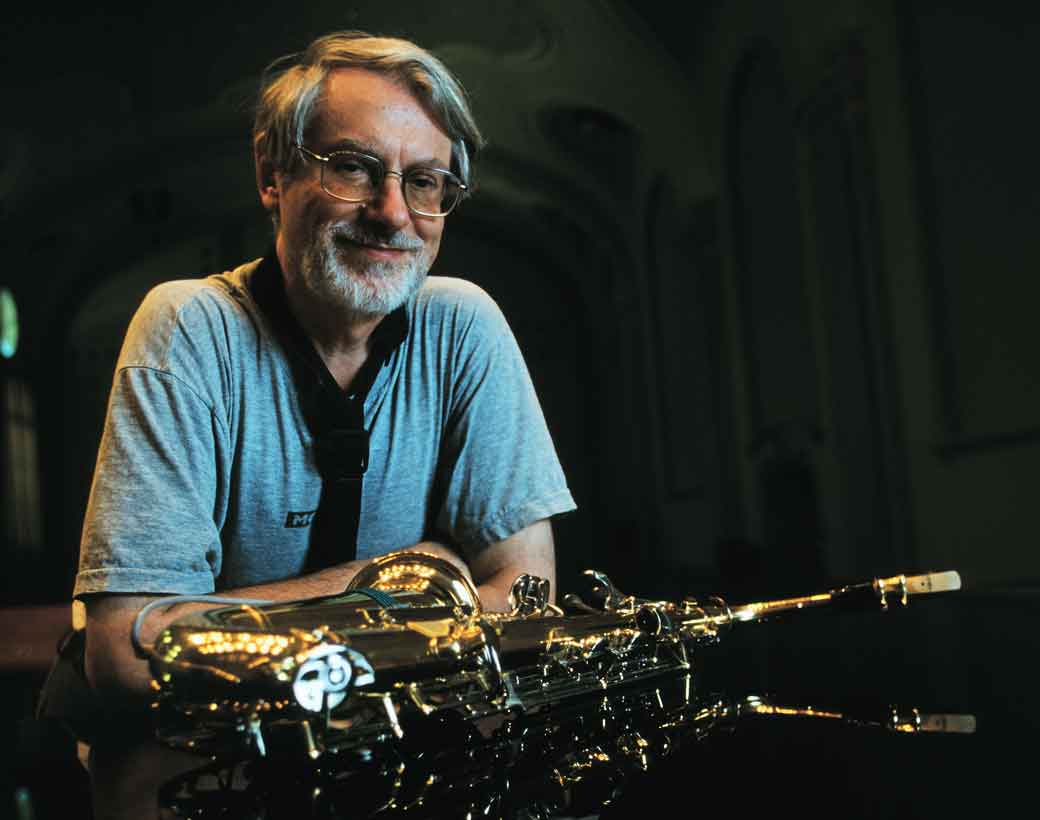
Bruno Spoerri

Bruno Alexander Spoerri (born 16 August 1935) is a Swiss jazz and electronics musician.

Born in Zurich, he studied applied psychology in Basel and Zurich. He played the saxophone as a student and toured with the Modern Jazz Group Freiburg in Germany and Switzerland. In the early 1960s, he worked as a psychologist and career counsellor. He experimented with an electrified saxophone and published the album Voice of Taurus in 1978.

== Discography ==
- Jazz-Rock Experience (Deram, 1970)
- Glückskugel (Finders Keepers Records, 1971–1980)
- Container (1976)
- Voice of Taurus (Gold Records/Inzec, 1978)
- Toy Planet with Irmin Schmidt (Spoon Records, 1981)
- AX+BY+CZ+D=0 (1983)
- Zürich Tenors (FFO 1983, with Ernst Gerber, Fernando Fantini, Richard Lipiec, Umberto Foletti, Rolf Cizmek, Hans Brunner)
- Albert Mangelsdorff - Bruno Spoerri - Christy Doran - Reto Weber: Shake, Shuttle and Blow (Enja, 1999)

== Awards ==
- Jazz Festival Zürich 1954: First Prize for Saxophone and Band
- Jazz Festival Düsseldorf (Deutschland) 1956: Second Prize for Alto Saxophone with Modern Jazz Group Freiburg
- Jazz Festival Zürich 1958: First Prize for Bigband
- International Advertising Film Festival Cannes 1965: First Prize for TV-Spot Bic (Produktion Televico)
- American TV and Radio Commercials Festival 1971: Clio for TV-Spot Riri
- 1973 Filmpreis der Stadt Zürich
- 1979 First prize in Ars Electronica Linz for Demonstration of Lyricon
- 1992 Featured Guest Composer bei der International Computer Music Conference San José
- Various awards for advertising films by the Art Directors’ Club Switzerland
- Art Prize 2004 of the municipality of Zollikon (Hintermeister-Gyger Foundation)
- Swiss Jazz Award 2017
- Sankt Elektronika Lifetime Achievement Award, St. Gallen
