= Paul Schütze =

Australian artist resident in London (born 1958)

Background information
- Born: 1 May 1958 (age 68); Melbourne, Australia
- Genres: Avant-garde, electronic, ambient, jazz fusion
- Occupations: Musician, composer
- Instruments: keyboards, sampler
- Years active: 1979 – present
- Labels: Big Cat UK, Extreme, Virgin
- Website: www.paulschutze.com

Paul Schütze (born 1 May 1958) is an Australian artist resident in London. Over thirty years his work has spanned composition, performance, installation, video, printmaking and photography.

== Biography ==
Schütze was born in Melbourne, Australia. He spent his childhood painting and drawing but left Caulfield Institute after only two months of an Arts Foundation Course to work in a factory. There he earned the money to buy his first electronic musical equipment. In 1979 he spent several months travelling and ended up in London where he immersed himself in concerts, museums and galleries. Returning to Melbourne he formed the improvising group Laughing Hands with Gordon Harvey, Ian Russell and Paul Widdicombe. The group existed in several forms until disbanding in 1982.

Schütze spent the next decade writing scores for films. His first feature soundtrack, The Tale of Ruby Rose (1987), won the Australian Film Institute Award for Best original Music Score. During this period Schütze lectured on film sound at both Swinburne Institute and AFTRS and worked as a film critic both in print and on national radio.

In collaboration with Michael Trudgeon, Anthony Kitchener and Dominic Lowe, Schütze curated and featured in Deus Ex Machina, an exhibition-publication at Monash University in 1989. This was to be his first sound installation and subsequently his first solo album.

In 1992, Schütze re-located to London during a period of particular fertility in the independent music scene, and he released nearly thirty albums of original works over the next decade. Schütze contributed writings to The Wire, and performed his music in Europe, Scandinavia and Japan, often with regular collaborator Simon Hopkins. In 1996, he formed improvising super-group Phantom City with Bill Laswell, Raoul Björkenheim, Dirk Wachtelaer at its core, with Alex Buess, Toshinori Kondo, Lol Coxhill and Jah Wobble as guest collaborators.

In 2000, Schütze was invited to exhibit in Sonic Boom at the Hayward Gallery London by curator David Toop. The same year he received a large commission for a permanent installation work for Capgemini and a second for a massive twenty-two screen audio-video work at the Gasometer in Oberhausen, Germany. He also contributed a sound work to James Turrell's Eclipse event/publication in Cornwall.

In 2002, Schütze began working with Alan Cristea Gallery London. In 2003, his first solo show, Vertical Memory, opened at ACG. The show included prints, video, sound and a huge wall work in which the whole of Alain Robbe-Grillet's novel Topology of A Phantom City, was rendered as a continuous plane of silver text. In 2004, Stiftelsen 314 in Bergen, Norway mounted his solo show Garden of Instruments. This was the next stage in a large-scale project that began in 1997 with the release of Schutze's spoken architectural opera Second Site and continued with a series of lightboxes for ACG also in 2004. This project, which is still ongoing, now has its own site.

In 2006, Schütze began to work with Galleria Estiarte in Madrid showing prints, videos and lightboxes. His work is also shown at the Alan Cristea Gallery in London. Following Schütze's two residencies at Cité des Arts in Paris making photographs, a solo show of photography – Twilight Science – opened in London at Alan Cristea Gallery in May 2008.

An ongoing commission (initiated in 1999) to make a sound work for James Turrell's Roden Crater has involved several research trips and has now been completed as a five-hour installation piece in Dolby Surround.

In 2011, Schütze launched dressingtheair.com, an open access online platform for multisensory creativity.

== Discography ==
=== Studio albums ===
- Deus Ex Machina (1989)
- The Annihilating Angel; Or, The Surface of the World (1990)
- New Maps of Hell (1992)
- New Maps of Hell II: The Rapture of Metals (1993)
- The Surgery of Touch (1994)
- Apart (1995)
- Abysmal Evenings (1996)
- Nine Songs From the Garden of Welcome Lies (1997)
- Second Site: 27°37'35" N 77°13'05" E (1997)
- Stateless (1997) Schütze's contribution to Driftworks
- Third Site (1999)
- The Gazing Engine (1999)
- Writing on Water: Twenty-two Dreams Recalled (2001)
- Seven Degrees Live (2002)
- Plasma Falls (2002)
- Dressing The Air (2002)
- The Sky Torn Apart (2018)

=== Released under a pseudonym ===
- More Beautiful Human Life! (1994) as Uzect Plaush
- Vertical Memory (1995) as Seed

=== Soundtrack albums ===
- Regard: Music by Film (1991)
- Isabelle Eberhardt: The Oblivion Seeker (1994)

=== Collaboration albums ===
- Narratives: Music for Fiction (1996) with Voice of Eye & Robert Rich
- Site Anubis (1996) with Phantom City
- Fell (1996) with Andrew Hulme
- The Ulm Concert (1997) with Simon Hopkins
- Shiva Recoil: Live/Unlive (1997) with Phantom City
- Driftworks (1997) with Thomas Koner, Nijiumu, Pauline Oliveros & Randy Raine-Reusch
- Soundwork 01 (2009) with Andrew Hulme
- Third Site Live (2010) with Raoul Bjorkenheim, Simon Hopkins & Clive Bell
- Live Horbar-Hamburg Dec 2009 (2010) with Simon Hopkins

=== Compilation albums ===
- Green Evil: Stray Particles 1982-1996 (1998)
- Sound Paintings (1998)
