= Raoul Björkenheim =

American jazz guitarist

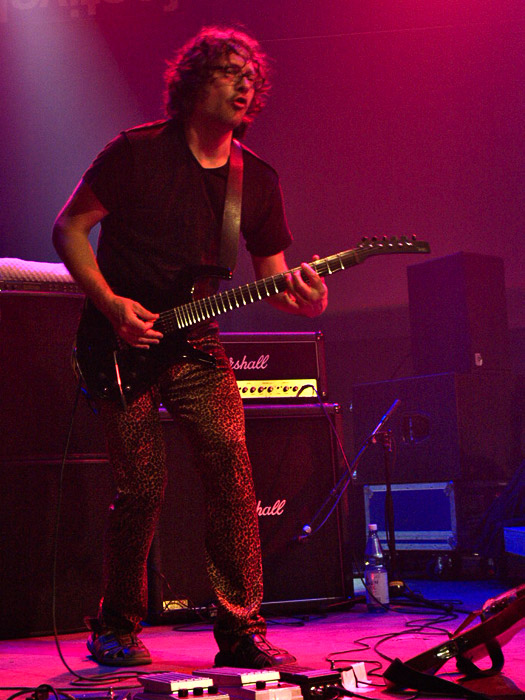
- Raoul Bjorkenheim at Moers Festival, Germany, 2006

Background information
- Born: February 11, 1956 (age 69); Los Angeles, California, U.S.
- Genres: Avant-garde jazz, electronic
- Occupation: Musician
- Instrument: Guitar
- Years active: 1980s–present
- Labels: ECM, Cuneiform, Rune Grammofon
- Website: raoulbjorkenheim.com

Raoul Melvin Björkenheim (born February 11, 1956) is a Finnish-American jazz guitarist, who has lived in Helsinki, New York, and Los Angeles.

His mother is Finnish-American actress Taina Elg. In his teens he moved to Finland. He attended the Helsinki Conservatory and the Berklee School of Music. His professional career began in the 1980s with Finnish jazz drummer Edward Vesala. After recording three albums with Vesala, he formed Krakatau. During the 1990s he reduced the band to a trio. He recorded an album with guitarist Nicky Skopelitis that was produced by Bill Laswell.

Björkenheim has composed for the Finnish Radio Symphony Orchestra, Helsinki Philharmonic Orchestra, and the UMO Jazz Orchestra and worked as a soloist with the Avanti! Chamber Orchestra and Tampere Philharmonic Orchestra. He recorded three albums for Rune Grammofon in the Scorch Trio with Ingebrigt Håker Flaten (bass) and Paal Nilssen-Love (drums). Other collaborators include Hamid Drake, William Parker, Kalle Kalima, and the band Kvalda.
