= O Yuki Conjugate =

- Origin: Nottingham
- Genres: post-industrial; ambient
- Years active: 1982–present
- Website: www.oyukiconjugate.com

O Yuki Conjugate (OYC) are an English post-industrial/ambient musical group founded in 1982 in Nottingham, by Roger Horberry and Andrew Hulme and intermittently active since 1997. Their music has been variously described as 'ambient', 'fourth world', 'ethnic', 'tribal' and 'dark wave'; the band prefer to call it 'dirty ambient'. They are currently in their fourth incarnation based around Horberry and Hulme. Previous members include Clare Elliot, Tim Horberry, Malcolm McGeorge, Dan Mudford, Pete Woodhead and Rob Jenkins, with Joe Gardiner contributing sax.

Originally inspired by the spirit and sound of post-punk, they soon started pioneering their own brand of ambient at a time (early 80s) when few people were interested in such a low-key approach. Their 1984 debut album Scene In Mirage encapsulated their position: one side was beat driven and 'electronic', the other side was 'organic' and made up of ambient soundscapes. Their approach to music-making is deliberately eclectic, combining high tech editing, low tech electronics and found instrumentation.

In May 2017, following a lengthy period of hibernation – a regular feature of the band's career – OYC released a new album called Tropic, essentially two long pieces generated out of material recorded during the Equator sessions almost 20 years earlier. As such it is an example of OYC's self-described "wilfully obscure" approach.

== Partial discography ==
- Scene in Mirage, a-mission LP, 1984.
- Into Dark Water, Final Image LP, 1987.
- Peripheral Vision, Ikon video, 1988.
- Primitive (collected works 1983–1987), Staalplaat/Soleilmoon, 1996.
- Peyote, Multimood/Projekt, 1991.
- Undercurrents (in Dark Water), Staalplaat/Soleilmoon, 1992.
- Equator, Staalplaat, 1994 (Co-produced by Paul Schutze).
- Sunchemical, Staalplat, 1995
- Sunchemical Remixes EP, Staalplaat, 1995.
- Spoke: Live in Nevers (with The Sons of Silence), Noise Museum, 1996
- Circular No 1/ Circular No 2 EP, Syntactic, 1997.
- The Euphoria of Disobedience, OYC Limited, 2006.
- OYC25 (also known as 25 Years of Willful Obscurity), Soleilmoon, 2009.
- Ambiguism 1983-1987, Vinyl On Demand, 2011
- Tropic, Aufabwegen, 2017
- Sleepwalker, Aufabwegen, 2019
